= 2023–24 SC Telstar season =

SC Telstar
2023–24 season
- Manager: Mike Snoei (until 5 February); Ulrich Landvreugd (caretaker, from 5 February)
- Stadium: 711 Stadion
- Eerste Divisie: 17th
- KNVB Cup: 2nd round
- Top goalscorer: League: Zakaria Eddahchouri (14 goals); All: Zakaria Eddahchouri (14 goals)
- Highest home attendance: 3,222 (8th week)
- Lowest home attendance: 1,073 (2nd week)
- Average home league attendance: 2,217
- Biggest win: 5-1 (Jong FC Utrecht (h) 32nd week)
- Biggest defeat: 6-1 (MVV Maastricht (a) 24th week)
- All statistics correct as of 10 May 2024.

The 2023–24 season was the 61st season in SC Telstar's history since its establishment. During the campaign, the club participated in the Eerste Divisie for the 47th time, extending its uninterrupted presence in the second division of Dutch football to 46 consecutive seasons.

Alongside their Eerste Divisie campaign, SC Telstar also competed in the KNVB Cup. However, their cup run came to an end in the opening round following a 1–0 loss against GVVV.

SC Telstar concluded the league season in 17th position. Zakaria Eddahchouri emerged as the club's top goalscorer, netting 14 goals throughout the campaign, all in the Eerste Divisie.

Mitch Apau registered the most appearances for SC Telstar during the season, featuring in 38 competitive fixtures, comprising 37 league matches and one KNVB Cup appearance.

== Players ==
=== First-team squad ===
As of 3 January 2024

Note: Flags indicate national team as defined under FIFA eligibility rules; some limited exceptions apply. Players may hold more than one non-FIFA nationality.

No.	Pos.	Nation	Player
1	GK	NED	Ronald Koeman Jr.
2	DF	NED	Jay Kruiver
3	DF	NED	Mitch Apau
4	DF	NED	Thomas Oude Kotte
5	DF	GHA	Robin Polley
6	MF	BEL	Sebbe Augustijns
7	MF	NED	Cain Seedorf
8	MF	NED	Jayden Turfkruier
9	FW	MAR	Youssef El Kachati
10	FW	GRE	Christos Giousis
11	FW	NED	Yahya Boussakou
12	MF	NED	Tom Overtoom
14	FW	NED	Mees Kaandorp
15	DF	NED	Devon Koswal
16	DF	NED	Yaël Liesdek
16	MF	NED	Zakaria Fatihi

No.	Pos.	Nation	Player
17	FW	NED	Zakaria Eddahchouri
18	DF	NED	Damian van Dijk
18	DF	NED	Jorginho Soares
19	FW	NED	Quinten van den Heerik
20	GK	NED	Joey Houweling
21	MF	NED	Alae-Eddine Bouyaghlafen
23	DF	NED	Leonardo Rocha de Almeida
24	MF	NED	Alex Plat
25	MF	NED	Danny Bakker
26	MF	NED	Tim van de Loo
27	FW	MAR	Mohammed Tahiri
29	DF	RSA	Peter Guinari
29	MF	NED	Rychaintelo Knoll
39	FW	SUR	Danzell Gravenberch
43	DF	NED	Lassana Faye

== Transfers ==
=== In ===
Pos.	Player	Transferred from	Fee	Date
MF	(Netherlands) Alae-Eddine Bouyaghlafen	(Netherlands) RKSV Spartaan'20 U21	Free	1 July 2023
DF	(Netherlands) Lassana Faye	(Canada) York United FC	Free	1 July 2023
DF	(Netherlands) Leonardo Rocha de Almeida	(Netherlands) RKSV Spartaan'20 U21	—N/a	1 July 2023
MF	(Belgium) Sebbe Augustijns	(Netherlands) RKC Waalwijk	Free	1 July 2023
FW	(Morocco) Youssef El Kachati	(Netherlands) Quick Boys	Free	1 July 2023
FW	(Netherlands) Zakaria Eddahchouri	(Netherlands) Koninklijke HFC	Free	13 July 2023
DF	(Netherlands) Mees Kaandorp	(Denmark) De Graafschap	Free	3 August 2023
FW	(Morocco) Mohammed Tahiri	(Netherlands) Jong Sparta Rotterdam	Free	9 August 2023
DF	(Netherlands) Devon Koswal	(Netherlands) FC Dordrecht	Free	11 August 2023
FW	(Suriname) Danzell Gravenberch	(Greece) Karmiotissa FC	Free	30 August 2023
MF	(Netherlands) Alex Plat	(Netherlands) NAC Breda	Free	31 August 2023
DF	(Netherlands) Robin Polley	(Netherlands) Heracles Almelo	Free	1 September 2023
DF	(Netherlands) Danny Bakker	No club	—N/a	29 September 2023
DF	(South Africa) Peter Guinari	No club	—N/a	3 January 2024

=== Out ===
Pos.	Player	Transferred to	Fee	Date
FW	(Netherlands) David Min	(Netherlands) RKC Waalwijk	End of loan	30 June 2023
FW	(Netherlands) Koen Blommestijn	(Netherlands) FC Volendam	End of loan	30 June 2023
MF	(Netherlands) Anwar Bensabouh	No club	—N/a	1 July 2023
DF	(Netherlands) Delvechio Blackson	No club	—N/a	1 July 2023
MF	(England) DJ Buffonge	No club	—N/a	1 July 2023
FW	(Netherlands) Glynor Plet	End of career	—N/a	1 July 2023
FW	(Netherlands) Rein Smit	No club	—N/a	1 July 2023
DF	(Turkey) Özgür Aktaş	(Netherlands) MVV Maastricht	Free	14 July 2023
DF	(Israel) Jonathan Mulder	(Netherlands) TOP Oss	Free	26 July 2023
MF	(Netherlands) Niels van Wetten	(Sweden) Oskarshamns AIK	Free	3 August 2023
MF	(Netherlands) Anass Najah	(Azerbaijan) Sabail FK	Free	7 August 2023
MF	(Netherlands) Achraf Madi	(Spain) Atlético Saguntino	Free	1 September 2023
DF	(Netherlands) Lassana Faye	(Latvia) FK Liepāja	Free	18 January 2024
MF	(Belgium) Sebbe Augustijns	(Belgium) Lyra-Lierse	Free	25 January 2024

== Pre-season and friendlies ==
Win Draw Loss Fixtures

15 July 2023 Friendly	SC Telstar (Netherlands)	5–3	(Netherlands) Excelsior Maassluis

18 July 2023 Friendly	FC Lisse (Netherlands)	1–6	(Netherlands) SC Telstar

25 July 2023 Friendly	SC Telstar (Netherlands)	1–0	(Netherlands) Rijnsburgse Boys

== Competitions ==
=== Overall record ===
Competition	First match	Last match	Starting round	Final position	Record							
Competition	First match	Last match	Starting round	Final position	Pld	W	D	L	GF	GA	GD	Win %
Eerste Divisie	14 August 2023	10 May 2024	Week 1	17th	38	9	8	21	47	68	−21	23.68
KNVB Cup	31 October 2023		1st round	1st round	1	0	0	1	0	1	−1	0.00
Total					39	9	8	22	47	69	−22	23.08

Last updated: 10 May 2024
Source: Soccerway

=== Eerste Divisie ===
==== League table ====
Pos	Team	Pld	W	D	L	GF	GA	GD	Pts	Promotion or qualification
15	Jong Ajax	38	10	10	18	54	69	−15	40	Reserve teams are not eligible to be promoted to the Eredivisie
16	Jong PSV	38	11	7	20	63	81	−18	40	Reserve teams are not eligible to be promoted to the Eredivisie
17	Telstar	38	9	8	21	47	68	−21	35	
18	TOP Oss	38	10	4	24	32	66	−34	34	
19	Den Bosch	38	8	9	21	38	68	−30	33	

Source: Flashscore, Keuken Kampioen Divisie (in Dutch)
Rules for classification: Season in progress: 1) Most points won; 2) Less points lost; 3) Goal difference; 4) Goals scored; 5) Alphabetical order; End of season: 1) Points; 2) Goal difference; 3) Goals scored; 4) Head-to-head points; 5) Head-to-head goal difference; 6) Head-to-head away goals scored; 7) Play-off if relevant for deciding champion, relegation or participating in a European league, otherwise by draw. 8) Penalty shoot-out (only after a play-off)

==== Results summary ====
Overall								Home						Away					
Pld	W	D	L	GF	GA	GD	Pts	W	D	L	GF	GA	GD	W	D	L	GF	GA	GD
38	9	8	21	47	68	−21	35	7	5	7	31	30	+1	2	3	14	16	38	−22

Last updated: 10 May 2024.
Source: Worldfootball

==== Results by round ====
Round	1	2	3	4	5	6	7	8	9	10	11	12	13	14	15	16	17	18	19	20	21	22	23	24	25	26	27	28	29	30	31	32	33	34	35	36	37	38
Ground	A	H	A	H	H	A	A	H	A	H	A	H	A	H	A	H	A	A	H	A	H	A	H	A	H	H	A	H	A	H	A	H	H	A	H	H	A	H
Result	L	L	L	L	L	L	D	W	L	W	L	W	L	L	W	L	D	L	L	L	D	L	D	L	W	D	W	D	L	W	L	W	W	L	L	D	L	W
Position	15	19	19	19	19	20	20	19	20	19	19	17	18	19	18	18	18	18	18	19	19	19	20	20	19	19	17											17

Updated to match(es) played on 10 May 2024. Source: ESPN
A = Away; H = Home; W = Win; D = Draw; L = Loss

=== Matches ===
The league fixtures were unveiled on 30 June 2023.

==== 1st half ====
14 August 2023 1st week	Jong PSV	1–0	SC Telstar	Eindhoven
20:00	Jason van Duiven 68'	Report		Stadium: De Herdgang; Attendance: 950; Referee: Robin Vereijken

18 August 2023 2nd week	SC Telstar	2–3	SC Cambuur	Velsen-Zuid
20:00	Quinten van den Heerik 46'; Zakaria Eddahchouri 79'	Report	Milan Smit 19' (pen.) 34' (pen.); Michael Breij 71'	Stadium: 711 Stadion; Attendance: 1,073; Referee: Stan Teuben

28 August 2023 3rd week	Jong AZ	3–1	SC Telstar	The Hague
20:00	Jayden Addai 23' 81' 90+4' (pen.)	Report	Zakaria Eddahchouri 90+2'	Stadium: AFAS Trainingscomplex; Attendance: 637; Referee: Wouter Wiersma

1 September 2023 4th week	SC Telstar	0–1	FC Eindhoven	Velsen-Zuid
20:00		Report	Thomas Oude Kotte 56' (o.g.)	Stadium: 711 Stadion; Attendance: 1,660; Referee: Martin Fernando Perezlindo

9 September 2023 5th week	SC Telstar	1–2	VVV-Venlo	Velsen-Zuid
16:30	Jayden Turfkruier 14'	Report	Pepijn Doesburg 73'; Martijn Berden 90+5'	Attendance: 1,369; Referee: Jesse Rozendal

15 September 2023 6th week	Roda JC Kerkrade	3–0	SC Telstar	Kerkrade
20:00	Walid Ould-Chikh 9'; Maximilian Schmid 65'; Arjen van der Heide 90+5'	Report		Stadium: Parkstad Limburg Stadion; Attendance: 8,155; Referee: Erwin Blank

22 September 2023 7th week	ADO Den Haag	1–1	SC Telstar	The Hague
20:00	Henk Veerman 28'	Report	Mees Kaandorp 56'	Stadium: Bingoal Stadion; Attendance: 6,418; Referee: Kevin Puts

29 September 2023 8th week	SC Telstar	3–2	Jong Ajax	Velsen-Zuid
20:00	Zakaria Eddahchouri 11'; Danzell Gravenberch 47'; Quinten van den Heerik 90+5'	Report	Gabriel Misehouy 10' 87'	Stadium: 711 Stadion; Attendance: 3,222; Referee: Thomas Hardeman

6 October 2023 9th week	FC Emmen	2–0	SC Telstar	Emmen
20:00	Piotr Parzyszek 3'; Desley Ubbink 24'	Report		Stadium: De Oude Meerdijk; Attendance: 7,249; Referee: Jannick van der Laan

14 October 2023 10th week	SC Telstar	2–1	MVV Maastricht	Velsen-Zuid
20:00	Zakaria Eddahchouri 10'; Quinten van den Heerik 90+3'	Report	Dailon Livramento 87'	Stadium: 711 Stadion; Attendance: 2,237; Referee: Robin Vereijken

20 October 2023 11th week	NAC Breda	3–1	SC Telstar	Breda
20:00	Dominik Janošek 20' (pen.); Matthew Garbett 66'; Tom Boere 71'	Report	Zakaria Eddahchouri 8'	Stadium: Rat Verlegh Stadion; Attendance: 17,853; Referee: Nick Smit

27 October 2023 12th week	SC Telstar	1–0	TOP Oss	Velsen-Zuid
20:00	Mitch Apau 90+1'	Report		Stadium: 711 Stadion; Attendance: 1,963; Referee: Martijn Vos

3 November 2023 13th week	Helmond Sport	1–0	SC Telstar	Helmond
20:00	Martijn Kaars 29'	Report		Stadium: Stadion De Braak; Attendance: 2,143; Referee: Luuk Timmer

10 November 2023 14th week	SC Telstar	1–2	De Graafschap	Velsen-Zuid
20:00	Mohammed Tahiri 87'	Report	David Flakus Bosilj 60'; Devin Haen 81'	Stadium: 711 Stadion; Attendance: 2,463; Referee: Martin van den Kerkhof

17 November 2023 15th week	FC Den Bosch	1–4	SC Telstar	's-Hertogenbosch
18:45	Ryan Leijten 61'	Report	Zakaria Eddahchouri 38' (pen.) 51' 73'; Tom Overtoom 56'	Stadium: De Vliert; Attendance: 4,497; Referee: Michael Eijgelsheim

24 November 2023 16th week	SC Telstar	1–5	Willem II Tilburg	Velsen-Zuid
20:00	Zakaria Eddahchouri 60'	Report	Nick Doodeman 9' 74'; Jeredy Hilterman 33'; Thijs Oosting 54'; Jesse Bosch 59'	Stadium: 711 Stadion; Attendance: 2,419; Referee: Marc Nagtegaal

4 December 2023 17th week	Jong FC Utrecht	0–0	SC Telstar	Groningen
20:00		Report		Stadium: Euroborg; Attendance: 272; Referee: Boyd van Kommer

8 December 2023 18th week	FC Groningen	2–0	SC Telstar	Groningen
20:00	Luciano Valente 6' 22'	Report		Stadium: Euroborg; Attendance: 18,788; Referee: Jannick van der Laan

15 December 2023 19th week	SC Telstar	0–2	FC Dordrecht	Velsen-Zuid
20:00		Report	Ilias Bronkhorst 69'; Mathis Suray 89'	Attendance: 2,063; Referee: Laurens Gerrets

22 December 2023 20th week	VVV-Venlo	2–1	SC Telstar	Venlo
20:00	Levi Smans 14'; Magnus Kaastrup 61'	Report	Zakaria Eddahchouri 34'	Stadium: De Koel; Attendance: 5,091; Referee: Edwin van de Graaf

==== 2nd half ====
12 January 2024 21st week	SC Telstar	1–1	Jong AZ	Velsen-Zuid
20:00	Zakaria Eddahchouri 22'	Report	Ernest Poku 39'	Stadium: BUKO Stadion; Attendance: 1,912; Referee: Michael Eijgelsheim

19 January 2024 22nd week	TOP Oss	1–0	SC Telstar	Oss
20:00	Konstantinos Doumtsios 88'	Report		Stadium: Frans Heesen Stadion; Attendance: 1,680; Referee: Robin Vereijken

26 January 2024 23rd week	SC Telstar	0–0	FC Den Bosch	Velsen-Zuid
20:00		Report		Stadium: BUKO Stadion; Attendance: 2,099; Referee: Martin Fernando Perezlindo

2 February 2024 24th week	MVV Maastricht	6–1	SC Telstar	Maastricht
20:00	Ferre Slegers 1'; Özgür Aktaş 10'; Mart Remans 43'; Ronald Koeman Jr. 80' (o.g.); Bryan Smeets 84' 88' (pen.)	Report	Youssef El Kachati 76'	Stadium: De Geusselt; Attendance: 5,043; Referee: Clay Ruperti

9 February 2024 25th week	SC Telstar	3–2	Helmond Sport	Velsen-Zuid
20:00	Youssef El Kachati 16' 36'; Christos Giousis 44'	Report	Martijn Kaars 28'; Álvaro Marín 82'	Stadium: BUKO Stadion; Attendance: 1,940; Referee: Laurens Gerrets

16 February 2024 26th week	SC Telstar	1–1	NAC Breda	Velsen-Zuid
20:00	Danny Bakker 8'	Report	Tom Boere 75'	Stadium: BUKO Stadion; Attendance: 2,390; Referee: Boyd van Kommer

26 February 2024 27th week	Jong Ajax	0–3	SC Telstar	Duivendrecht, Amsterdam
20:00		Report	Danzell Gravenberch 14' (pen.); Tim van de Loo 24'; Youssef El Kachati 80'	Stadium: Sportpark De Toekomst; Attendance: 820; Referee: Luuk Timmer

1 March 2024 28th week	SC Telstar	1–1	Roda JC Kerkrade	Velsen-Zuid
20:00	Youssef El Kachati 15'	Report	Václav Sejk 50'	Stadium: BUKO Stadion; Attendance: 2,580; Referee: Stan Teuben

8 March 2024 29th week	FC Dordrecht	2–0	SC Telstar	Dordrecht
20:00	Dylan Mbayo 17'; Rocco Robert Shein 83'	Report		Stadium: Stadion Krommedijk; Attendance: 3,272; Referee: Klass Clerkx

15 March 2024 30th week	SC Telstar	3–1	ADO Den Haag	Velsen-Zuid
20:00	Danzell Gravenberch 14'; Mees Kaandorp 42'; Youssef El Kachati 47'	Report	Jort van der Sande 37'	Stadium: BUKO Stadion; Attendance: 2,863; Referee: Clay Ruperti

23 March 2024 31st week	SC Cambuur	1–0	SC Telstar	Leeuwarden
20:00	Remco Balk 73'	Report		Stadium: Cambuur Stadion; Attendance: 9,630; Referee: Rob Dieperink

29 March 2024 32nd week	SC Telstar	5–1	Jong FC Utrecht	Velsen-Zuid
20:00	Cain Seedorf 1' 72'; Mohammed Tahiri 40' 55'; Mees Kaandorp 49'	Report	Lynden Edhart 21'	Stadium: BUKO Stadion; Attendance: 2,140; Referee: Wouter Wiersma

5 April 2024 33rd week	SC Telstar	3–1	Jong PSV	Velsen-Zuid
20:00	Mohammed Tahiri 23'; Devon Koswal 67'; Zakaria Eddahchouri 79'	Report	Dantaye Gilbert 44'	Stadium: BUKO Stadion; Attendance: 2,234; Referee: Luuk Timmer

12 April 2024 34th week	De Graafschap	5–1	SC Telstar	Doetinchem
20:00	Simon Colyn 30'; Xandro Schenk 40' 90+1'; Donny Warmerdam 84'; Tristan van Gilst 90+3'	Report	Alex Plat 18'	Stadium: De Vijverberg; Attendance: 11,087; Referee: Robin Hensgens

19 April 2024 35th week	SC Telstar	2–3	FC Emmen	Velsen-Zuid
20:00	Mohammed Tahiri 29'; Thomas Oude Kotte 34'	Report	Vicente Besuijen 52'; Ben Scholte 56'; Maikel Kieftenbeld 66'	Stadium: BUKO Stadion; Attendance: 2,433; Referee: Thomas Hardeman

28 April 2024 36th week	FC Eindhoven	1–1	SC Telstar	Eindhoven
12:15	Evan Rottier 3'	Report	Zakaria Eddahchouri 55'	Stadium: Jan Louwers Stadion; Attendance: 2,349; Referee: Clay Ruperti

3 May 2024 37th week	SC Telstar	1–1	Jong PSV	Velsen-Zuid
20:00	Zakaria Eddahchouri 1'	Report	Thom van Bergen 90+5'	Stadium: BUKO Stadion; Attendance: 3,063; Referee: Richard Martens

10 May 2024 38th week	Willem II Tilburg	3–2	SC Telstar	Tilburg
20:00	Thijs Oosting 47'; Rob Nizet 81'; Ringo Meerveld 90+3'	Report	Jay Kruiver 33'; Freek Heerkens 45' (o.g.)	Stadium: Koning Willem II Stadion; Attendance: 14,340; Referee: Marc Nagtegaal

=== KNVB Cup ===
31 October 2023 1st round	GVVV	1–0	SC Telstar	Veenendaal
20:00	Jonathan Vergara Berrio 89'	Report		Stadium: Sportpark Panhuis; Attendance: 1,500; Referee: Martin Fernando Perezlindo

== Statistics ==
=== Scorers ===
#	Player	Eerste Divisie
1	(Netherlands) Zakaria Eddahchouri	14
2	(Morocco) Youssef El Kachati	6
3	(Morocco) Mohammed Tahiri	5
4	(Suriname) Danzell Gravenberch	3
4	(Netherlands) Mees Kaandorp	3
4	(Netherlands) Quinten van den Heerik	3
7	(Netherlands) Frank Korpershoek	2
8	(Netherlands) Alex Plat	1
8	(Greece) Christos Giousis	1
8	(Netherlands) Danny Bakker	1
8	(Netherlands) Devon Koswal	1
8	(Netherlands) Jay Kruiver	1
8	(Netherlands) Jayden Turfkruier	1
8	(Netherlands) Mitch Apau	1
8	(Netherlands) Thomas Oude Kotte	1
8	(Netherlands) Tim van de Loo	1
8	(Netherlands) Tom Overtoom	1

=== Appearances ===
#	Player	Eerste Divisie	KNVB	Total
1	(Netherlands) Mitch Apau	37	1	38
2	(Netherlands) Tim van de Loo	35	1	36
3	(Netherlands) Alex Plat	34	1	35
4	(Netherlands) Cain Seedorf	33	1	34
5	(Suriname) Jayden Turfkruier	32	1	33
6	(Netherlands) Thomas Oude Kotte	31	0	31
7	(Morocco) Mohammed Tahiri	28	1	29
8	(Netherlands) Quinten van den Heerik	27	1	28
8	(Netherlands) Zakaria Eddahchouri	27	1	28
10	(Suriname) Danzell Gravenberch	26	1	27
11	(Netherlands) Devon Koswal	25	1	26
11	(Netherlands) Tom Overtoom	25	1	26
13	(Netherlands) Ronald Koeman Jr.	25	0	25
14	(Morocco) Youssef El Kachati	22	0	22
15	(Netherlands) Danny Bakker	21	0	21
15	(Netherlands) Jay Kruiver	21	0	21
17	(Belgium) Sebbe Augustijns	19	1	20
18	(Netherlands) Mees Kaandorp	18	0	18
18	(Netherlands) Jorginho Soares	17	1	18
20	(Greece) Christos Giousis	15	0	15
20	(Netherlands) Joey Houweling	14	1	15
22	(Netherlands) Yahya Boussakou	9	0	9
23	(Netherlands) Alae-Eddine Bouyaghlafen	8	0	8
23	(Ghana) Robin Polley	8	0	8
25	(South Africa) Peter Guinari	7	0	7
26	(Netherlands) Lassana Faye	6	0	6
27	(Netherlands) Zakaria Fatihi	4	0	4
28	(Netherlands) Yaël Liesdek	3	0	3
29	(Netherlands) Damian van Dijk	2	0	2
29	(Netherlands) Leonardo Rocha de Almeida	2	0	2
31	(Curaçao) Rychaintelo Knoll	1	0	1

=== Clean sheets ===
#	Player	Eerste Divisie
1	(Netherlands) Ronald Koeman Jr.	3
2	(Netherlands) Joey Houweling	1
Total		4

=== Disciplinary record ===
#	Player	Eerste Divisie		KNVB		Total	
#	Player	Yellow card	Red card	Yellow card	Red card	Yellow card	Red card
1	(Netherlands) Jay Kruiver	2	2	0	0	2	2
2	(Suriname) Jayden Turfkruier	6	1	0	0	6	1
3	(Netherlands) Danny Bakker	4	1	0	0	4	1
3	(Netherlands) Jorginho Soares	3	1	1	0	4	1
5	(Belgium) Sebbe Augustijns	3	1	0	0	3	1
6	(Netherlands) Mees Kaandorp	1	1	0	0	1	1
7	(Netherlands) Mitch Apau	6	0	0	0	6	0
8	(Morocco) Youssef El Kachati	5	0	0	0	5	0
9	(Netherlands) Devon Koswal	4	0	0	0	4	0
10	(Netherlands) Alex Plat	3	0	0	0	3	0
10	(Netherlands) Quinten van den Heerik	3	0	0	0	3	0
10	(Netherlands) Ronald Koeman Jr.	3	0	0	0	3	0
13	(Ghana) Robin Polley	2	0	0	0	2	0
13	(Netherlands) Thomas Oude Kotte	2	0	0	0	2	0
15	(Netherlands) Cain Seedorf	1	0	0	0	1	0
15	(Netherlands) Lassana Faye	1	0	0	0	1	0
15	(Netherlands) Tim van de Loo	1	0	0	0	1	0
15	(Netherlands) Tom Overtoom	1	0	0	0	1	0
15	(Netherlands) Zakaria Eddahchouri	1	0	0	0	1	0
