= Yahya Boussakou =

Dutch footballer (born 2000)

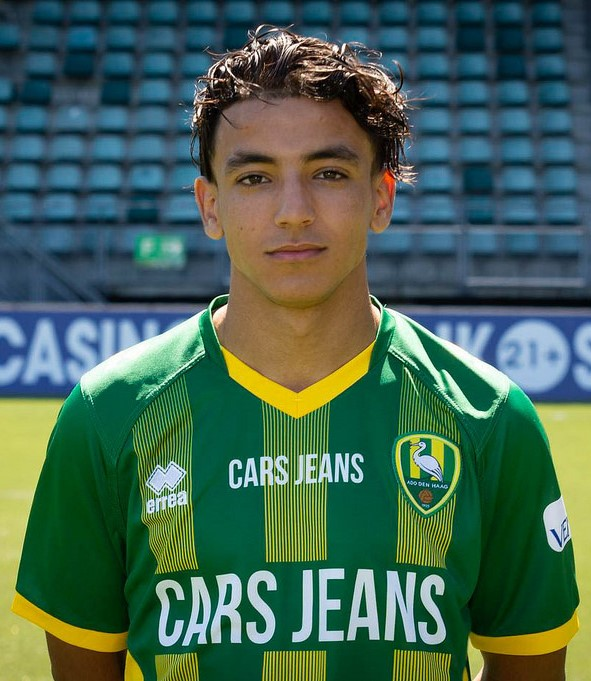

Personal information
- Date of birth: 4 March 2000 (age 26)
- Place of birth: The Hague, Netherlands
- Height: 1.78 m (5 ft 10 in)
- Positions: Winger; right-back

Youth career
- HVV Laakkwartier
- –2016: Haaglandia
- 2016–2019: ADO Den Haag

Senior career*
Years	Team	Apps	(Gls)
2019–2020	Jong ADO	12	(4)
2019–2022	ADO Den Haag	5	(0)
2022–2024	Telstar	33	(0)
2025	Pharco	3	(0)
- * Club domestic league appearances and goals as of 07:00, 11 May 2024 (UTC)

Yahya Boussakou (Arabic: يحيى بوصقو; born 4 March 2000) is a Dutch professional footballer who plays as a winger or right-back. He most recently played for Eerste Divisie club Telstar.

== Career ==
=== ADO Den Haag ===
Boussakou played youth football for HVV Laakkwartier, Haaglandia, and ADO Den Haag, where he signed his first contract in 2017. On 14 March 2019, Boussakou signed a professional contract with ADO Den Haag. He made his professional debut with ADO Den Haag in a 3–1 Eredivisie win over Excelsior on 25 April 2019, replacing Sheraldo Becker in the 88th minute. In the 2019–20 season, he represented the reserve team, Jong ADO, in the Derde Divisie, scoring four goals in 12 appearances. In December 2021, Boussakou, despite being under contract with ADO Den Haag, went on a two-week trial with Den Bosch to explore the possibility of a potential loan period. However, this move never materialised. `

=== Telstar ===
Boussakou joined Eerste Divisie club Telstar on 12 August 2022, where he signed a two-year contract. He made his debut for the club on 19 August, replacing Cain Seedorf in the 72nd minute of a 2–1 away loss to Willem II.

In the early stages of the 2022–23 season's second half, Boussakou began to make a name for himself as a right-back, despite his primary position being that of a winger. He quickly became one of Telstar's most notable players during this time. The opportunity to play in this new role came about due to injuries to Jay Kruiver and Yaël Liesdek, and head coach Mike Snoei had recognised Boussakou's attacking playing style and decided to utilise him as a right-back during their absence. On 9 March 2023, he signed a professional deal with Telstar, keeping him at the club until 2024 with an option for an additional year.

In summer 2025, Boussakou joined Egyptian side Pharco.

== Personal life ==
Born in the Netherlands, Boussakou is of Moroccan descent.

== Career statistics ==
As of match played 3 May 2024

Appearances and goals by club, season and competition
Club	Season	League			KNVB Cup		Other		Total	
Club	Season	Division	Apps	Goals	Apps	Goals	Apps	Goals	Apps	Goals
ADO Den Haag	2018–19	Eredivisie	1	0	0	0	—		1	0
ADO Den Haag	2019–20	Eredivisie	0	0	0	0	—		0	0
ADO Den Haag	2020–21	Eredivisie	0	0	0	0	—		0	0
ADO Den Haag	2021–22	Eerste Divisie	4	0	0	0	—		4	0
ADO Den Haag	Total		5	0	0	0	—		5	0
Jong ADO Den Haag	2019–20	Derde Divisie	12	4	—		—		12	4
Telstar	2022–23	Eerste Divisie	24	0	1	0	—		25	0
Telstar	2023–24	Eerste Divisie	9	0	0	0	—		9	0
Telstar	Total		33	0	1	0	—		34	0
Career total			50	4	1	0	0	0	51	4
