= 2022–23 SC Telstar season =

SC Telstar
2022–23 season
- Manager: Mike Snoei
- Stadium: BUKO Stadion
- Eerste Divisie: 9th
- KNVB Cup: 2nd round
- Top goalscorer: League: Glynor Plet (11 goals); All: Glynor Plet (11 goals)
- Highest home attendance: 3,571 (32nd week)
- Lowest home attendance: 1,644 (9th week)
- Average home league attendance: 2,178
- Biggest win: 2-0 (Jong PSV (a) 10th week); 5-3 (MVV Maastricht (h) 18th week)
- Biggest defeat: 7-0 (Heracles Almelo (a) 26th week)
- All statistics correct as of 19 May 2023.

The 2022–23 season marked the 60th year in the history of SC Telstar since the club was founded. It was also Telstar's 46th season competing in the Eerste Divisie, including their 45th successive campaign in the second tier of Dutch football.

In addition to their league participation, Telstar entered the KNVB Cup. Their involvement in the competition ended in the second round after suffering a 3–1 defeat to FC Twente.

Telstar secured 9th place in the final Eerste Divisie standings, while Glynor Plet finished as the team's leading scorer with 11 goals, all of which were scored in league matches.

Mitch Apau was the club's most frequently used player during the season, making 40 appearances across all competitions. These included 38 matches in the Eerste Divisie and two appearances in the KNVB Cup.

The season spans a period between 8 August 2022 and 19 May 2023.

== First-team squad ==
As of 8 February 2023

Note: Flags indicate national team as defined under FIFA eligibility rules; some limited exceptions apply. Players may hold more than one non-FIFA nationality.

No.	Pos.	Nation	Player
1	GK	NED	Ronald Koeman Jr.
2	MF	NED	Yaël Liesdek
3	DF	NED	Mitch Apau
4	DF	NED	Özgür Aktaş
5	DF	SUR	Delvechio Blackson
6	MF	NED	Anwar Bensabouh
7	FW	NED	Cain Seedorf
8	MF	EST	Mihkel Ainsalu
8	MF	NED	Achraf Madi
9	FW	NED	Glynor Plet (captain)
10	FW	GRE	Christos Giousis
11	FW	NED	Quinten van den Heerik
12	MF	NED	Tom Overtoom
13	MF	NED	Cas Dijkstra
14	MF	NED	Niels van Wetten

No.	Pos.	Nation	Player
15	MF	ENG	DJ Buffonge
16	DF	NED	Jay Kruiver
17	FW	NED	Koen Blommestijn
18	DF	NED	Jorginho Soares
19	FW	NED	David Min
20	GK	NED	Joey Houweling
21	MF	NED	Anass Najah
23	MF	NED	Cas Dijkstra
24	DF	NED	Thomas Oude Kotte
25	FW	NED	Yahya Boussakou
27	DF	ISR	Jonathan Mulder
29	FW	NED	Rein Smit
37	MF	NED	Zakaria Fatihi
50	DF	SUR	Jayden Turfkruier

== Transfers ==
=== In ===
Pos.	Player	Transferred from	Fee	Date
MF	(Netherlands) Anass Najah	(Cyprus) Akritas Chlorakas	Free	1 July 2022
FW	(Netherlands) Cain Seedorf	(Netherlands) ADO Den Haag	Free	1 July 2022
GK	(Netherlands) Joey Houweling	(Netherlands) Jong FC Utrecht	Free	1 July 2022
MF	(Estonia) Mihkel Ainsalu	(Estonia) FCI Levadia Tallinn	Free	1 July 2022
DF	(Netherlands) Mitch Apau	(Netherlands) FC Emmen	Free	1 July 2022
FW	(Netherlands) Quinten van den Heerik	(Netherlands) PEC Zwolle U21	Free	1 July 2022
DF	(Cape Verde) Jorginho Soares	(Netherlands) ASWH	Free	14 July 2022
DF	(Netherlands) Thomas Oude Kotte	(Denmark) Vendsyssel FF	Free	20 July 2022
DF	(Israel) Jonathan Mulder	(Netherlands) ADO Den Haag	Free	23 July 2022
FW	(Netherlands) Koen Blommestijn	(Netherlands) FC Volendam	On loan	5 August 2022
FW	(Netherlands) Yahya Boussakou	(Netherlands) ADO Den Haag	Free	12 August 2022
FW	(Netherlands) David Min	(Netherlands) RKC Waalwijk	On loan	15 August 2022
FW	(Greece) Christos Giousis	(Greece) AEK Athens B F.C.	—N/a	26 August 2022
MF	(England) DJ Buffonge	No club	—N/a	30 January 2023
MF	(Netherlands) Achraf Madi	(Netherlands) Jong Sparta Rotterdam	—N/a	31 January 2023

=== Out ===
Pos.	Player	Transferred to	Fee	Date
MF	(Brazil) Giovanni	(Netherlands) Jong Ajax	End of loan	30 June 2022
DF	(Russia) Roman Tugarinov	(Spain) Espanyol B	End of loan	30 June 2022
GK	(Netherlands) Abdel El Ouazzane	No club	—N/a	1 July 2022
MF	(Netherlands) Lesley Bakker	(Netherlands) Rijnsburgse Boys	Free	1 July 2022
FW	(Netherlands) Marouan El Ouardani	No club	—N/a	1 July 2022
FW	(Netherlands) Randy Wolters	No club	—N/a	1 July 2022
FW	(Netherlands) Rashaan Fernandes	(Netherlands) Go Ahead Eagles	Free	1 July 2022
DF	(Netherlands) Redouan Taha	No club	—N/a	1 July 2022
MF	(Netherlands) Sven van Doorm	(Netherlands) FC Eindhoven	Free	1 July 2022
DF	(Netherlands) Tyrese Gemert	No club	—N/a	1 July 2022
DF	(Netherlands) Anthony Berenstein	(Netherlands) GVVV	Free	26 July 2022
DF	(Belgium) Siebe Vandermeulen	(Belgium) Royal Charleroi SC	Free	2 August 2022
GK	(Curaçao) Trevor Doornbusch	(Netherlands) FC Dordrecht	Free	3 August 2022
MF	(Azerbaijan) Ozan Kökçü	(Netherlands) FC Eindhoven	€100,000	6 August 2022
DF	(Netherlands) Jip Molenaar	(Netherlands) DVVA Amsterdam	Free	15 August 2022
MF	(Suriname) Roscello Vlijter	(Cyprus) Peyia 2014	Free	23 August 2022
FW	(Netherlands) Gyliano van Velzen	(Cyprus) Peyia 2014	Free	29 August 2022
MF	(Netherlands) Stanley Akoy	(Cyprus) Olympias Lympion	Free	31 August 2022
FW	(Netherlands) Yassine Zakir	(Romania) FC Metaloglobus București	Free	5 September 2022
MF	(Netherlands) Cas Dijkstra	(Netherlands) Koninklijke HFC	Free	31 January 2023
MF	(Estonia) Mihkel Ainsalu	(Estonia) FCI Levadia Tallinn	Free	8 February 2023

== Competitions ==
=== Overall record ===
Competition	First match	Last match	Starting round	Final position	Record							
Competition	First match	Last match	Starting round	Final position	Pld	W	D	L	GF	GA	GD	Win %
Eerste Divisie	8 August 2022	19 May 2023	Week 1	9th	38	14	11	13	39	52	−13	36.84
KNVB Cup	18 October 2022	10 January 2023	1st round	2nd round	2	1	0	1	2	3	−1	50.00
Total					40	15	11	14	41	55	−14	37.50

Source: ESPN

=== Eerste Divisie ===
==== League table ====
Pos	Team	Pld	W	D	L	GF	GA	GD	Pts	Promotion or qualification
7	VVV-Venlo	38	16	10	12	56	51	+5	58	Qualification for promotion play-offs
8	Eindhoven	38	16	10	12	58	54	+4	58	Qualification for promotion play-offs
9	Telstar	38	14	11	13	39	52	−13	53	
10	De Graafschap	38	15	7	16	64	54	+10	52	
11	Jong AZ	38	14	9	15	60	58	+2	51	Reserve teams are not eligible to be promoted to the Eredivisie

Source: Soccerway, Keuken Kampioen Divisie (in Dutch)
Rules for classification: Season in progress: 1) Most points won; 2) Less points lost; 3) Goal difference; 4) Goals scored; 5) Alphabetical order; End of season: 1) Points; 2) Goal difference; 3) Goals scored; 4) Head-to-head points; 5) Head-to-head goal difference; 6) Head-to-head away goals scored; 7) Play-off if relevant for deciding champion, relegation or participating in a European league, otherwise by draw. 8) Penalty shoot-out (only after a play-off)

==== Results summary ====
Overall								Home						Away					
Pld	W	D	L	GF	GA	GD	Pts	W	D	L	GF	GA	GD	W	D	L	GF	GA	GD
38	14	11	13	39	52	−13	53	8	5	6	22	25	−3	6	6	7	17	27	−10

Source: ESPN

==== Results by round ====
Round	1	2	3	4	5	6	7	8	9	10	11	12	13	14	15	16	17	18	19	20	21	22	23	24	25	26	27	28	29	30	31	32	33	34	35	36	37	38
Ground	A	H	A	H	H	A	H	A	H	A	H	A	H	A	H	A	H	H	A	H	A	H	A	A	H	A	H	A	A	H	A	H	A	H	A	H	A	H
Result	D	L	L	W	L	W	L	D	D	W	W	D	D	D	D	L	W	W	L	W	D	L	W	W	D	L	L	W	D	W	L	L	L	W	W	D	L	W
Position																																						9

Updated to match(es) played on 19 May 2023. Source: ESPN
A = Away; H = Home; W = Win; D = Draw; L = Loss

=== Matches ===
The league fixtures were announced on 17 June 2022.

==== 1st half ====
8 August 2022 1st week	Jong Ajax	1–1	SC Telstar	Duivendrecht, Amsterdam
20:00	Francisco Conceição 41'	Report	Koen Blommestijn 5'	Stadium: Sportpark De Toekomst; Attendance: 1,613; Referee: Martin Fernando Perezlindo

12 August 2022 2nd week	SC Telstar	0–5	PEC Zwolle	Velsen-Zuid
20:00		Report	Chardi Landu 2' 36'; Apostolos Vellios 9'; Luis Görlich 65'; Thomas van den Belt 86'	Stadium: BUKO Stadion; Attendance: 1,753; Referee: Robin Gansner

19 August 2022 3rd week	Willem II Tilburg	2–1	SC Telstar	Tilburg
20:00	Matthias Verreth 36'; Max Svensson 74'	Report	Glynor Plet 58'	Stadium: Koning Willem II Stadion; Attendance: 12,096; Referee: Martin van den Kerkhof

26 August 2022 4th week	SC Telstar	2–1	Helmond Sport	Velsen-Zuid
20:00	Koen Blommestijn 45+2'; Glynor Plet 71' (pen.)	Report	Bryan Van Hove 14'	Stadium: BUKO Stadion; Attendance: 1,825; Referee: Michael Eijgelsheim

1 September 2022 5th week	SC Telstar	0–1	De Graafschap	Velsen-Zuid
20:00		Report	Giovanni Korte 50'	Stadium: BUKO Stadion; Attendance: 2,254; Referee: Laurens Gerrets

9 September 2022 6th week	Almere City FC	0–1	SC Telstar	Almere
20:00		Report	David Min 90+6'	Stadium: BUKO Stadion; Attendance: 1,615; Referee: Martijn Vos

16 September 2022 7th week	SC Telstar	0–3	Heracles Almelo	Velsen-Zuid
20:00		Report	Emil Hansson 58'; Rigino Cicilia 87'; Nikolai Laursen 90+4' (pen.)	Stadium: BUKO Stadion; Attendance: 2,357; Referee: Alex Bos

23 September 2022 8th week	VVV-Venlo	1–1	SC Telstar	Venlo
21:00	Sven Braken 90+7'	Report	Mihkel Ainsalu 87'	Stadium: De Koel; Attendance: 4,658; Referee: Nick Smit

30 September 2022 9th week	SC Telstar	2–2	Jong FC Utrecht	Velsen-Zuid
20:00	David Min 20'; Christos Giousis 65'	Report	Derensili Sanches Fernandes 64' (pen.); Lynden Edhart 84'	Stadium: BUKO Stadion; Attendance: 1,644; Referee: Wouter Wiersma

7 October 2022 10th week	Jong PSV	0–2	SC Telstar	Eindhoven
20:00		Report	Christos Giousis 68' (pen.); Yaël Liesdek 75'	Stadium: De Herdgang; Attendance: 438; Referee: Robin Vereijken

14 October 2022 11th week	SC Telstar	2–1	Roda JC Kerkrade	Velsen-Zuid
20:00	David Min 12'; Glynor Plet 15' (pen.)	Report	Dylan Vente 90+4'	Stadium: BUKO Stadion; Attendance: 1,733; Referee: Pol van Boekel

24 October 2022 12th week	Jong AZ	0–0	SC Telstar	Alkmaar
20:00		Report		Stadium: AFAS Trainingscomplex; Attendance: 900; Referee: Michael Eijgelsheim

28 October 2022 13th week	SC Telstar	2–2	FC Dordrecht	Velsen-Zuid
20:00	Tom Overtoom 3'; Glynor Plet 12'	Report	Jaymillio Pinas 1' 37'	Stadium: BUKO Stadion; Attendance: 1,773; Referee: Kevin Puts

4 November 2022 14th week	NAC Breda	1–1	SC Telstar	Breda
20:00	Vieri Kotzebue 21'	Report	Mitch Apau 23'	Stadium: Rat Verlegh Stadion; Attendance: 16,058; Referee: Laurens Gerrets

11 November 2022 15th week	SC Telstar	0–0	ADO Den Haag	Velsen-Zuid
20:00		Report		Stadium: BUKO Stadion; Attendance: 2,766; Referee: Martijn Vos

18 November 2022 16th week	FC Eindhoven	3–0	SC Telstar	Eindhoven
18:45	Brian De Keersmaecker 11'; Jasper Dahlhaus 88'; Evan Rottier 90+2'	Report		Stadium: Jan Louwers Stadion; Attendance: 3,306; Referee: Jannick van der Laan

11 December 2022 17th week	SC Telstar	1–0	FC Den Bosch	Velsen-Zuid
14:30	Tom Overtoom 77'	Report		Stadium: BUKO Stadion; Attendance: 1,700; Referee: Robin Gansner

==== 2nd half ====
6 January 2023 19th week	TOP Oss	2–1	SC Telstar	Oss
20:00	Glynor Plet 10' (o.g.); Rick Dekker 88'	Report	Christos Giousis 26'	Stadium: Frans Heesen Stadion; Attendance: 1,629; Referee: Wouter Wiersma

13 January 2023 20th week	SC Telstar	1–0	Jong AZ	Velsen-Zuid
20:00	Glynor Plet 7'	Report		Stadium: BUKO Stadion; Attendance: 1,963; Referee: Stan Teuben

21 January 2023 21st week	FC Dordrecht	0–0	SC Telstar	Dordrecht
16:30		Report		Stadium: Stadion Krommedijk; Attendance: 1,622; Referee: Michael Eijgelsheim

24 January 2023 18th week	SC Telstar	5–3	MVV Maastricht	Velsen-Zuid
20:00	Christos Giousis 20'; Rein Smit 28' 34' 49'; Glynor Plet 87'	Report	Jarne Steuckers 24'; Koen Kostons 56'; Rein Van Helden 60'	Stadium: BUKO Stadion; Attendance: 1,734; Referee: Martin Fernando Perezlindo

27 January 2023 22nd week	SC Telstar	0–1	Almere City FC	Velsen-Zuid
20:00		Report	Lance Duijvestijn 80'	Stadium: BUKO Stadion; Attendance: 2,291; Referee: Robin Vereijken

3 February 2023 23rd week	De Graafschap	0–1	SC Telstar	Doetinchem
20:00		Report	Jonathan Mulder 84'	Stadium: De Vijverberg; Attendance: 9,257; Referee: Robin Hensgens

13 February 2023 24th week	Jong FC Utrecht	0–1	SC Telstar	Utrecht
20:00		Report	Tom Overtoom 50'	Stadium: Sportcomplex Zoudenbalch; Attendance: 362; Referee: Luuk Timmer

17 February 2023 25th week	SC Telstar	1–1	Jong PSV	Velsen-Zuid
20:00	David Min 3'	Report	Simon Colyn 48'	Stadium: BUKO Stadion; Attendance: 2,211; Referee: Clay Ruperti

24 February 2023 26th week	Heracles Almelo	7–0	SC Telstar	Almelo
20:00	Anas Ouahim 11' 35'; Nikolai Laursen 24'; Samuel Armenteros 39' 80' 89'; Emil Hansson 77'	Report		Stadium: Asito Stadion; Attendance: 10,435; Referee: Martin Fernando Perezlindo

3 March 2023 27th week	SC Telstar	0–1	FC Eindhoven	Velsen-Zuid
20:00		Report	Charles-Andreas Brym 23'	Stadium: BUKO Stadion; Attendance: 2,159; Referee: Marc Nagtegaal

10 March 2023 28th week	Roda JC Kerkrade	1–2	SC Telstar	Kerkrade
20:00	Dylan Vente 86'	Report	David Min 20'; Christos Giousis 83' (pen.)	Stadium: Parkstad Limburg Stadion; Attendance: 6,156; Referee: Edwin van de Graaf

17 March 2023 29th week	Helmond Sport	2–2	SC Telstar	Helmond
20:00	Martijn Kaars 51'; Elmo Lieftink 90+3'	Report	Christos Giousis 13'; David Min 46'	Stadium: Stadion De Braak; Attendance: 1,354; Referee: Laurens Gerrets

26 March 2023 30th week	SC Telstar	1–0	TOP Oss	Velsen-Zuid
14:30	Glynor Plet 90+3'	Report		Stadium: BUKO Stadion; Attendance: 1,906; Referee: Jannick van der Laan

31 March 2023 31st week	ADO Den Haag	3–1	SC Telstar	The Hague
20:00	Titouan Thomas 50'; Thomas Verheydt 81' (pen.); Xander Severina 82'	Report	Glynor Plet 24'	Stadium: Bingoal Stadion; Attendance: 5,339; Referee: Ingmar Oostrom

7 April 2023 32nd week	SC Telstar	2–3	Jong Ajax	Velsen-Zuid
20:00	Glynor Plet 72' 90+5'	Report	Ar'jany Martha 28'; Kian Fitz-Jim 57'; Gabriel Misehouy 77'	Stadium: BUKO Stadion; Attendance: 3,571; Referee: Michael Eijgelsheim

14 April 2023 33rd week	PEC Zwolle	2–0	SC Telstar	Zwolle
20:00	Thomas van den Belt 22' 65'	Report		Stadium: MAC3PARK Stadion; Attendance: 14,000; Referee: Richard Martens

21 April 2023 34th week	SC Telstar	1–0	VVV-Venlo	Velsen-Zuid
20:00	David Min 53'	Report		Stadium: BUKO Stadion; Attendance: 2,377; Referee: Clay Ruperti

28 April 2023 35th week	FC Den Bosch	0–1	SC Telstar	's-Hertogenbosch
20:00		Report	Anwar Bensabouh 14'	Stadium: De Vliert; Attendance: 4,252; Referee: Nick Smit

5 May 2023 36th week	SC Telstar	0–0	Willem II Tilburg	Velsen-Zuid
20:00		Report		Stadium: BUKO Stadion; Attendance: 2,498; Referee: Alex Bos

12 May 2023 37th week	MVV Maastricht	2–1	SC Telstar	Maastricht
20:00	Jarne Steuckers 12'; Ruben van Bommel 20'	Report	Glynor Plet 80'	Stadium: De Geusselt; Attendance: 7,429; Referee: Marc Nagtegaal

19 May 2023 38th week	SC Telstar	2–1	NAC Breda	Velsen-Zuid
20:00	Quinten van den Heerik 90+1' 90+4'	Report	Odysseus Velanas 28'	Stadium: BUKO Stadion; Attendance: 2,863; Referee: Robin Gansner

=== KNVB Cup ===
18 October 2022 1st round	Koninklijke HFC	0–1	SC Telstar	Haarlem
20:00		Report	Christos Giousis 31'	Stadium: Spanjaardslaan; Attendance: 1,500; Referee: Ingmar Oostrom

10 January 2023 2nd round	FC Twente	3–1	SC Telstar	Enschede
18:45	Daan Rots 37' 42'; Virgil Misidjan 67'	Report	Thomas Oude Kotte 68'	Stadium: De Grolsch Veste; Attendance: 20,000; Referee: Sander van der Eijk

== Statistics ==
=== Scorers ===
#	Player	Eerste Divisie	KNVB	Total
1	(Netherlands) Glynor Plet	11	0	11
2	(Netherlands) David Min	7	0	7
2	(Greece) Christos Giousis	6	1	7
4	(Netherlands) Rein Smit	3	0	3
4	(Netherlands) Tom Overtoom	3	0	3
6	(Netherlands) Koen Blommestijn	2	0	2
6	(Netherlands) Quinten van den Heerik	2	0	2
8	(Netherlands) Anwar Bensabouh	1	0	1
8	(Israel) Jonathan Mulder	1	0	1
8	(Estonia) Mihkel Ainsalu	1	0	1
8	(Netherlands) Mitch Apau	1	0	1
8	(Netherlands) Yaël Liesdek	1	0	1
8	(Netherlands) Thomas Oude Kotte	0	1	1

=== Appearances ===
#	Player	Eerste Divisie	KNVB	Total
1	(Netherlands) Mitch Apau	38	2	40
2	(Netherlands) Anass Najah	37	2	39
3	(Netherlands) Glynor Plet	36	2	38
4	(Netherlands) Özgür Aktaş	34	2	36
5	(Netherlands) Ronald Koeman Jr.	33	2	35
6	(Netherlands) Thomas Oude Kotte	33	1	34
6	(Greece) Christos Giousis	32	2	34
8	(Netherlands) David Min	32	1	33
9	(Netherlands) Tom Overtoom	31	1	32
10	(Israel) Jonathan Mulder	29	2	31
11	(Netherlands) Anwar Bensabouh	29	1	30
12	(Suriname) Delvechio Blackson	25	2	27
13	(Netherlands) Jay Kruiver	25	1	26
14	(Netherlands) Cain Seedorf	24	1	25
14	(Netherlands) Yahya Boussakou	24	1	25
16	(Suriname) Jayden Turfkruier	22	1	23
17	(Netherlands) Jorginho Soares	15	2	17
18	(Netherlands) Rein Smit	15	1	16
19	(Netherlands) Yaël Liesdek	13	1	14
20	(Netherlands) Koen Blommestijn	13	0	13
20	(Estonia) Mihkel Ainsalu	12	1	13
22	(Netherlands) Quinten van den Heerik	8	0	8
23	(Netherlands) Joey Houweling	6	0	6
24	(England) DJ Buffonge	4	0	4
25	(Netherlands) Achraf Madi	2	0	2
25	(Netherlands) Cas Dijkstra	2	0	2
25	(Netherlands) Niels van Wetten	2	0	2
25	(Netherlands) Zakaria Fatihi	2	0	2

=== Clean sheets ===
#	Player	Eerste Divisie	KNVB Cup	Total
1	(Netherlands) Ronald Koeman Jr.	11	1	12
2	(Netherlands) Joey Houweling	3	0	3
Total		14	1	15

=== Disciplinary record ===
#	Player	Eerste Divisie		KNVB		Total	
#	Player	Yellow card	Red card	Yellow card	Red card	Yellow card	Red card
1	(Netherlands) Ronald Koeman Jr.	4	1	0	0	4	1
2	(Greece) Christos Giousis	1	1	1	0	2	1
3	(Netherlands) Anass Najah	8	0	0	0	8	0
4	(Russia) Özgür Aktaş	6	0	0	0	6	0
5	(Netherlands) Glynor Plet	4	0	0	0	4	0
5	(Netherlands) Koen Blommestijn	4	0	0	0	4	0
7	(Israel) Jonathan Mulder	3	0	0	0	3	0
7	(Netherlands) Tom Overtoom	3	0	0	0	3	0
7	(Suriname) Delvechio Blackson	2	0	1	0	3	0
10	(Netherlands) Cain Seedorf	2	0	0	0	2	0
10	(Netherlands) Jay Kruiver	2	0	0	0	2	0
10	(Netherlands) Jorginho Soares	2	0	0	0	2	0
10	(Netherlands) Mitch Apau	2	0	0	0	2	0
10	(Netherlands) Thomas Oude Kotte	2	0	0	0	2	0
15	(Netherlands) Anwar Bensabouh	1	0	0	0	1	0
15	(England) DJ Buffonge	1	0	0	0	1	0
15	(Suriname) Jayden Turfkruier	1	0	0	0	1	0
15	(Netherlands) Yahya Boussakou	1	0	0	0	1	0
