= Jayden Turfkruier =

Surinamese footballer (born 2002)

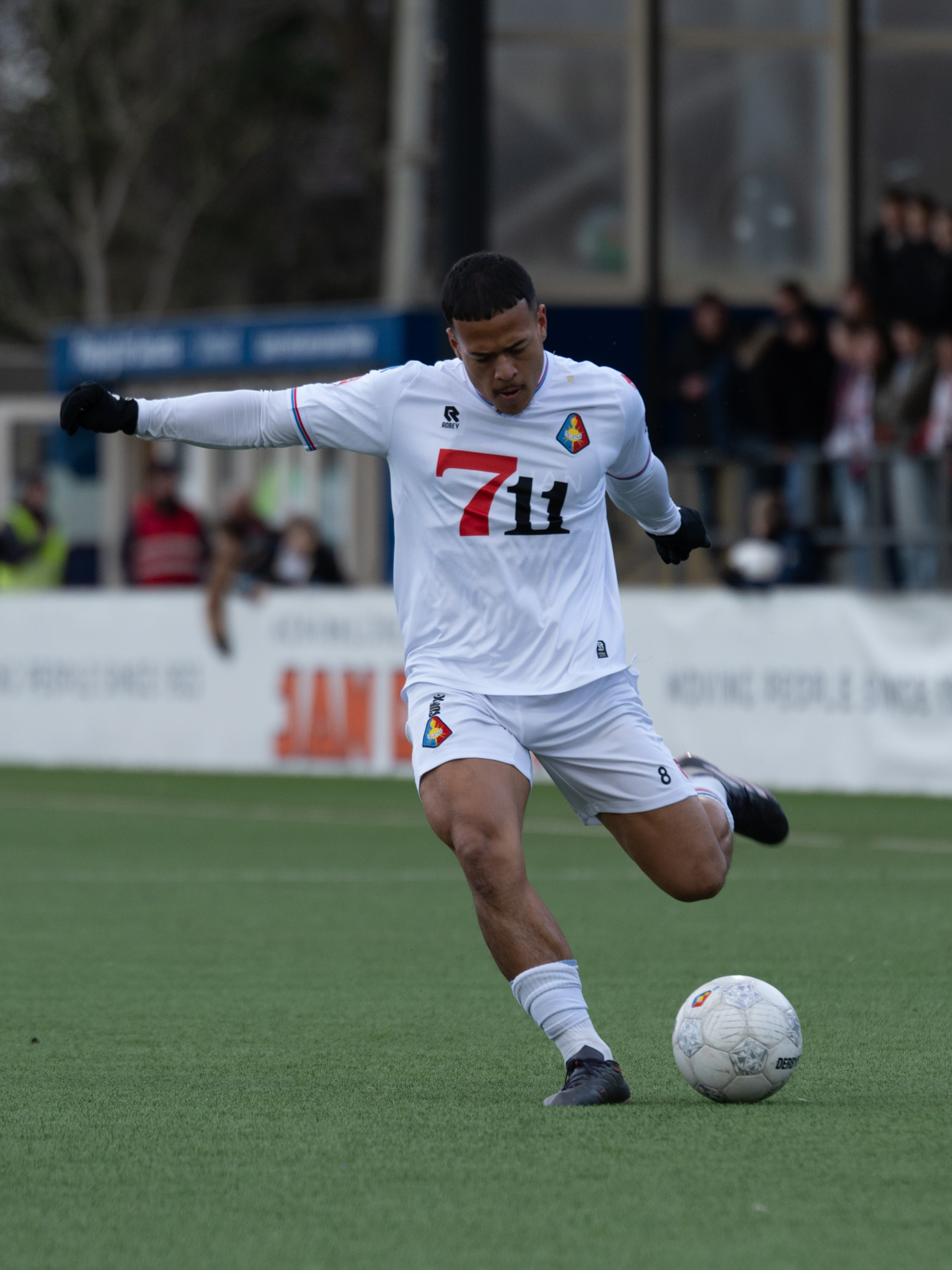
- Turfkruier with Telstar in 2025

Personal information
- Full name: Jayden Kelsey Turfkruier
- Date of birth: 25 September 2002 (age 24)
- Place of birth: Amsterdam, Netherlands
- Height: 1.73 m (5 ft 8 in)
- Position: Midfielder

Team information
- Current team: VPS
- Number: 7

Youth career
- –2019: ASC Waterwijk
- 2019–2021: AFC
- 2021–2022: Telstar

Senior career*
Years	Team	Apps	(Gls)
2022–2025	Telstar	87	(3)
2026–	VPS	30	(1)

International career^{‡}
2024–	Suriname	3	(0)
- * Club domestic league appearances and goals as of 13 November 2026 ‡ National team caps and goals as of 06:02, 10 June 2025 (UTC)

Jayden Kelsey Turfkruier (born 25 September 2002) is a professional footballer who plays as a midfielder for Finnish Veikkausliiga club VPS. Born in the Netherlands, he represents the Suriname national team.

== Career ==
=== Telstar ===
Turfkruier played youth football for ASC Waterwijk and AFC, before joining the Telstar youth academy in 2021. He was one of the first talents progressing through the academy to the first team in the club's new youth setup.

He made his professional debut for Telstar on 11 December 2022, replacing Anwar Bensabouh in the 82nd minute of a 1–0 home victory against Den Bosch. The week ahead of the game, the team had faced a situation where multiple players were experiencing cold and flu symptoms, making room for Turfkruier in the squad.

On 10 March 2023, Turfkruier signed his first professional contract with Telstar, keeping him at the club until 2024. The deal included an option for an additional year. In his first season in the first team, Turfkruier made 23 appearances. He quickly grew into a starter for Telstar, despite initially being on an amateur deal, winning the competition for his position in midfield over Jonathan Mulder.

Ahead of the 2023–24 season, Turfkruier attracted attention by scoring a hat-trick in a pre-season friendly against Hollandia. He scored his first professional goal on 9 September 2023, giving Telstar an early lead in a 2–1 home defeat to VVV-Venlo. In March 2024, Telstar exercised the option in his contract, extending his stay until mid-2025.

Turfkruier scored his first competitive brace on 8 September 2024 in a 4–0 home win over MVV. He concluded the 2024–25 season by helping the club secure promotion to the Eredivisie via the play-offs. He left the club as his contract expired on 30 June 2025.

=== VPS ===
On 15 January 2026, after more than six months as a free agent, Turfkruier signed a two-year contract with Finnish Veikkausliiga club VPS.

== International career ==
Born in the Netherlands, both of Turfkruier's parents are from Suriname - his father is Javanese Surinamese. He was called up to the Suriname national team for a set of CONCACAF Nations League matches against Canada in November 2024.

== Career statistics ==
As of match played 10 June 2026

Appearances and goals by club, season and competition
Club	Season	League			National cup (Note: Includes KNVB Cup, Finnish Cup)		League cup (Note: Includes Finnish League Cup)		Other		Total	
Club	Season	Division	Apps	Goals	Apps	Goals	Apps	Goals	Apps	Goals	Apps	Goals
Telstar	2022–23	Eerste Divisie	22	0	1	0	—		—		23	0
Telstar	2023–24	Eerste Divisie	32	1	1	0	—		—		33	1
Telstar	2024–25	Eerste Divisie	33	2	2	0	—		6 (Note: Appearances in Eredivisie promotion/relegation playoffs)	0	41	2
VPS	2026	Veikkausliiga	11	1	2	0	5	0	—		16	0
Career total			98	4	6	0	10	0	6	0	118	3
