= Joey Houweling =

Dutch footballer (born 2001)

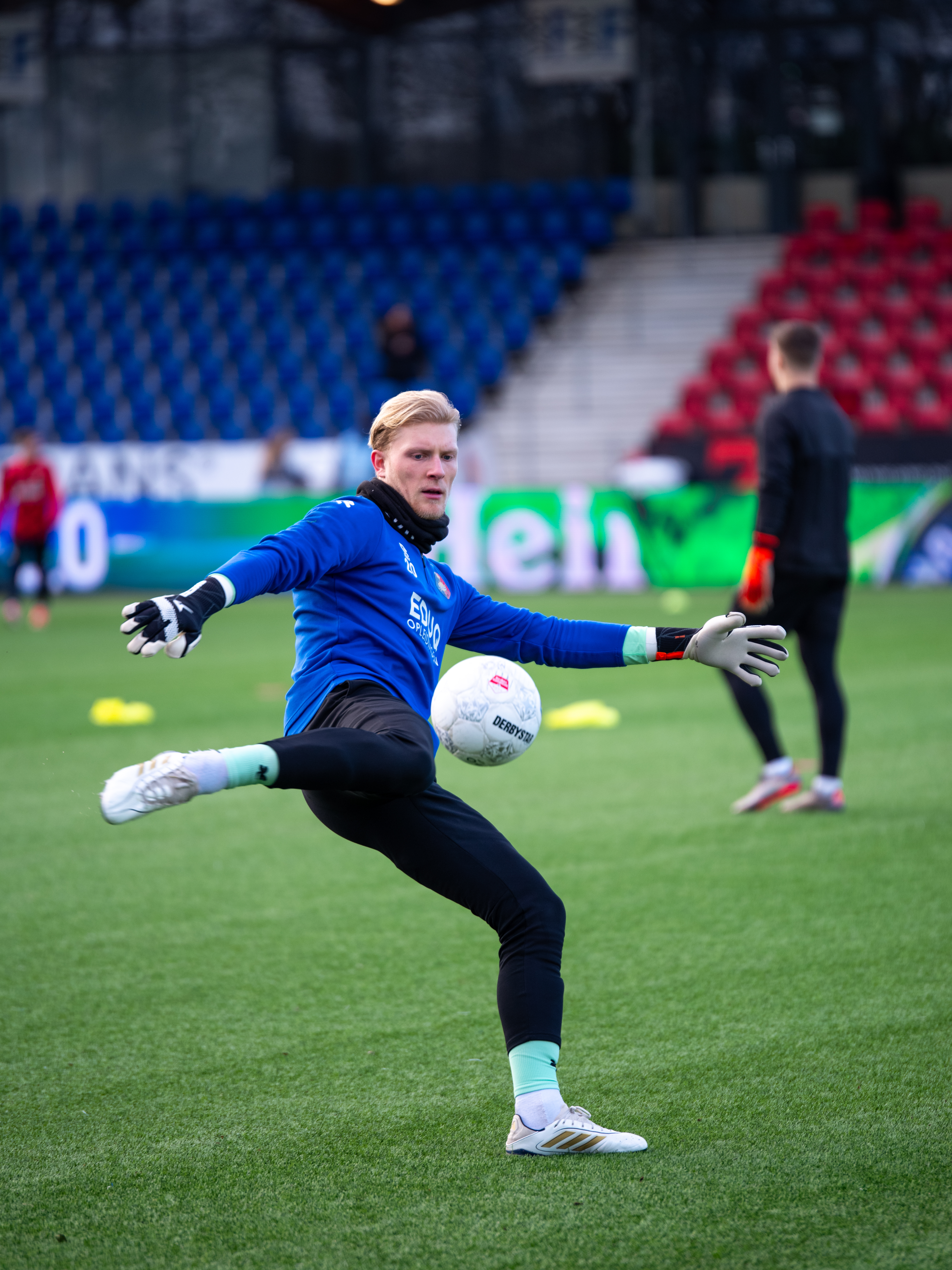
- Houweling with Telstar in 2025

Personal information
- Date of birth: 7 April 2000 (age 26)
- Place of birth: Huizen, Netherlands
- Height: 1.97 m (6 ft 6 in)
- Position: Goalkeeper

Team information
- Current team: Spakenburg
- Number: 13

Youth career
- –2011: SV Huizen
- 2011–2019: Utrecht

Senior career*
Years	Team	Apps	(Gls)
2018–2022	Jong Utrecht	12	(0)
2022–2025	Telstar	20	(0)
2025–	Spakenburg	24	(0)
- * Club domestic league appearances and goals as of 12:25, 25 July 2026 (UTC)

Joey Houweling (born 7 April 2000) is a Dutch professional footballer who plays as a goalkeeper for Tweede Divisie club Spakenburg.

== Career ==
=== Utrecht ===
Houweling was born in Huizen, North Holland, where he started playing youth football for local club SV Huizen, before joining the Utrecht youth academy in 2011. In 2019, he signed his first professional contract; a two-year deal with an option for an additional season. At that point, he had served as backup goalkeeper for the reserve team Jong Utrecht in the second-tier Eerste Divisie.

On 20 January 2020, Houweling made his professional debut for Jong Utrecht in a 2–1 home victory against Roda JC. A few days earlier, he featured in Utrecht's matchday squad for the first time, however remaining benched in the 3–3 draw against PEC Zwolle.

=== Telstar ===
In July 2022, Houweling signed with Eerste Divisie club Telstar. Starting the season as the backup to Ronald Koeman Jr., he made his debut for the club on 11 November 2022, after Koeman suffered an injury during practice. He kept a clean sheet in a 0–0 draw against ADO Den Haag. His performance subsequently earned praise from head coach Mike Snoei, who commended him for playing "flawlessly". He played several more games that season, as Koeman was suspended three games in January 2023.

On 29 May 2024, Houweling extended his contract with Telstar by one year, keeping him at the club until 30 June 2025. He remained the backup to Koeman during the 2024–25 season, in which Telstar secured promotion to the Eredivisie for the first time in 47 years. He left the club when his contract expired at the end of the season.

=== Spakenburg ===
On 1 October 2025, after training with Tweede Divisie side Spakenburg for several weeks, Houweling signed an amateur contract following a long-term injury to first-choice goalkeeper Indy Groothuizen. He made his debut three days later, coming on for Kyan van Dorp at half-time in a 5–2 defeat to Quick Boys. A week later, he made his first start, keeping a clean sheet in a 1–0 win over IJsselmeervogels.

== Career statistics ==
As of match played 16 May 2026

Appearances and goals by club, season and competition
Club	Season	League			National cup		Other		Total	
Club	Season	Division	Apps	Goals	Apps	Goals	Apps	Goals	Apps	Goals
Jong Utrecht	2019–20	Eerste Divisie	3	0	—		—		3	0
Jong Utrecht	2020–21	Eerste Divisie	7	0	—		—		7	0
Jong Utrecht	2021–22	Eerste Divisie	2	0	—		—		2	0
Jong Utrecht	Total		12	0	—		—		12	0
Telstar	2022–23	Eerste Divisie	6	0	0	0	—		6	0
Telstar	2023–24	Eerste Divisie	14	0	1	0	—		15	0
Telstar	Total		20	0	1	0	—		21	0
Spakenburg	2025–26	Tweede Divisie	24	0	0	0	—		24	0
Career total			56	0	1	0	0	0	57	0
