= Robin Polley =

Ghanaian footballer (born 1998)

Personal information
- Date of birth: 28 December 1998 (age 27)
- Place of birth: Rotterdam, Netherlands
- Height: 1.83 m (6 ft 0 in)
- Position: Right-back

Team information
- Current team: Jaro
- Number: 40

Youth career
- –2012: JHR
- 2012–2016: Spartaan '20
- 2016–2018: Feyenoord
- 2018–2019: ADO Den Haag

Senior career*
Years	Team	Apps	(Gls)
2018–2021	ADO Den Haag	2	(0)
2018–2019	Jong ADO	3	(1)
2020–2021	→ Dordrecht (loan)	24	(1)
2021–2023	Heracles Almelo	1	(0)
2023–2024	Telstar	8	(0)
2025–	Jaro	18	(0)

International career
2019	Ghana U23	4	(0)
- * Club domestic league appearances and goals as of 20 November 2025

Robin Polley (born 28 December 1998) is a Ghanaian professional footballer who plays as a right-back for Veikkausliiga club Jaro.

== Club career ==
After playing in the youth academies of JHR, Spartaan '20 and Feyenoord, and making his debut for the latter's U21 team in the Beloften Eredivisie, Polley made the move to ADO Den Haag in 2018. On 23 November 2018, Polley signed a professional contract for three years with ADO Den Haag. Polley made his professional debut with ADO Den Haag in a 3–1 Eredivisie loss to PSV Eindhoven on 11 August 2019.

On 5 August 2021, he signed a three-year contract with Heracles Almelo.

On 1 September 2023, Polley moved to Telstar. He made his debut for the club the same day, replacing Tim van de Loo in the 79th minute of a 1–0 league loss to FC Eindhoven.

On 9 January 2025, he signed with newly promoted Veikkausliiga club FF Jaro in Finland.

== International career ==
Polley represented the Ghana U23s at the 2019 Africa U-23 Cup of Nations.

== Personal life ==
Born in the Netherlands, Polley is of Ghanaian descent. He is the son of the Ghanaian former footballer Prince Polley.

== Career statistics ==
As of match played 27 February 2025

Appearances and goals by club, season and competition
Club	Season	League			Cup		Other		Total	
Club	Season	Division	Apps	Goals	Apps	Goals	Apps	Goals	Apps	Goals
ADO Den Haag	2018–19	Eredivisie	0	0	1	0	—		1	0
ADO Den Haag	2019–20	Eredivisie	2	0	1	0	—		3	0
ADO Den Haag	Total		2	0	2	0	—		4	0
Jong ADO	2019–20	Derde Divisie	3	1	—		—		3	1
Dordrecht (loan)	2019–20 (Note: Season curtailed due to COVID-19 pandemic in the Netherlands)	Eerste Divisie	8	1	0	0	—		8	1
Dordrecht (loan)	2020–21	Eerste Divisie	16	0	1	0	—		17	0
Dordrecht (loan)	Total		24	1	1	0	—		25	1
Heracles Almelo	2021–22	Eredivisie	1	0	1	0	0	0	2	0
Telstar	2023–24	Eerste Divisie	8	0	0	0	—		8	0
Jaro	2025	Veikkausliiga	0	0	0	0	5 (Note: Appearances in Finnish League Cup)	0	5	0
Career total			38	2	4	0	5	0	47	2
