= Christos Giousis =

Greek footballer (born 1999)

Personal information
- Date of birth: 8 February 1999 (age 27)
- Place of birth: Volos, Greece
- Height: 1.77 m (5 ft 10 in)
- Position: Forward

Team information
- Current team: Nea Salamina

Youth career
- 2013–2017: AEK Athens

Senior career*
| Years | Team | Apps | (Gls) |
| 2017–2022 | AEK Athens | 4 | (0) |
| 2020 | → Platanias (loan) | 6 | (0) |
| 2020–2021 | → Panachaiki (loan) | 27 | (4) |
| 2021–2022 | AEK Athens B | 29 | (17) |
| 2022–2024 | Telstar | 47 | (7) |
| 2024–2026 | Karmiotissa | 31 | (9) |
| 2025 | → AEL (loan) | 7 | (0) |
| 2026 | → Ethnikos Achna (loan) | 16 | (8) |
| 2026– | Nea Salamina | 1 | (1) |

International career
| 2017–2018 | Greece U19 | 14 | (3) |
| 2018 | Greece U21 | 2 | (0) |
- * Club domestic league appearances and goals as of 10:31, 30 August 2026 (UTC)

Christos Giousis (Greek: Χρήστος Γιούσης; born 8 February 1999) is a Greek professional footballer who plays as a right winger for Nea Salamina.

== Career ==
=== AEK Athens ===
On 21 August 2017, Giousis signed a professional contract with AEK Athens. On 11 December 2017, he made his debut in the Super League in a 3–1 home win game against Kerkyra as a late substitute.

==== Loan to Platanias ====
On 31 January 2020, Giousis moved to Super League 2 club Platanias, as on loan.

==== Loan to Panachaiki ====
On 5 October 2020, Giousis moved to Super League 2 club Panachaiki, as on loan.

=== Telstar ===
On 26 August 2022, Giousis signed a two-year contract with Dutch Eerste Divisie club Telstar. He made his debut for the club on 1 September, starting in a 1–0 home loss to De Graafschap, playing 66 minutes before being replaced by Tom Overtoom. On 30 September, he scored his first goal in home draw against Jong Utrecht. He played a key role for the rest of the season, playing 34 games – all as a starter – and helping Telstar achieve ninth place; their best season since 2018 and second best since 2005.

In July 2023, he suffered an injury in a pre-season friendly with Eindhoven, which sidelined him for several months. He made his comeback on 22 December 2023, replacing Tim van de Loo shortly before full-time in a loss to VVV-Venlo. He left the club as a free agent at the end of the 2023–24 season after failing to reach an agreement for a new contract with Telstar.

== Career statistics ==
As of match played 15 August 2025

Appearances and goals by club, season and competition
| Club | Season | League | | | Cup | | Europe | | Other | | Total | |
| Club | Season | Division | Apps | Goals | Apps | Goals | Apps | Goals | Apps | Goals | Apps | Goals |
|---|---|---|---|---|---|---|---|---|---|---|---|---|
| AEK Athens | 2017–18 | Superleague Greece | 1 | 0 | 2 | 2 | — | | — | | 3 | 2 |
| AEK Athens | 2018–19 | Superleague Greece | 1 | 0 | 3 | 0 | — | | — | | 4 | 0 |
| AEK Athens | 2019–20 | Superleague Greece | 1 | 0 | 0 | 0 | — | | — | | 1 | 0 |
| AEK Athens | 2020–21 | Superleague Greece | 0 | 0 | 0 | 0 | — | | — | | 0 | 0 |
| AEK Athens | 2021–22 | Superleague Greece | 1 | 0 | 0 | 0 | — | | — | | 1 | 0 |
| AEK Athens | Total | | 4 | 0 | 5 | 2 | 0 | 0 | — | | 9 | 2 |
| Platanias (loan) | 2019–20 | Superleague Greece 2 | 6 | 0 | — | | — | | — | | 6 | 0 |
| Panachaiki (loan) | 2020–21 | Superleague Greece 2 | 27 | 4 | — | | — | | — | | 27 | 4 |
| AEK Athens B | 2021–22 | Superleague Greece 2 | 29 | 17 | — | | — | | — | | 29 | 17 |
| Telstar | 2022–23 | Eerste Divisie | 32 | 6 | 2 | 1 | — | | — | | 34 | 7 |
| Telstar | 2023–24 | Eerste Divisie | 15 | 1 | 0 | 0 | — | | — | | 15 | 1 |
| Telstar | Total | | 47 | 7 | 2 | 1 | — | | — | | 49 | 8 |
| Karmiotissa | 2024–25 | Cypriot First Division | 31 | 9 | 1 | 0 | — | | — | | 32 | 9 |
| Career total | | | 144 | 37 | 8 | 3 | 0 | 0 | 0 | 0 | 152 | 40 |

== Honours ==
AEK Athens

- Super League: 2017–18
