= Blackson =

Blackson is a surname. Notable people with the surname include:

- Angelo Blackson (born 1992), American football player
- Delvechio Blackson (born 1995), Dutch footballer
- Michael Blackson (born 1972), Ghanaian-born American actor and comedian
