= Jonathan Mulder =

Israeli footballer (born 2002)

Jonathan Mulder יהונתן מולדר
Personal information
- Date of birth: 2 January 2002 (age 24)
- Place of birth: Houten, Netherlands
- Height: 1.87 m (6 ft 2 in)
- Position: Left-back

Team information
- Current team: Trenčín (on loan from Slovácko)
- Number: 13

Youth career
- 2008–2014: Maccabi Tel Aviv
- 2014–2016: AFC
- 2016–2020: AZ
- 2020–2021: ADO Den Haag

Senior career*
Years	Team	Apps	(Gls)
2020–2022	ADO Den Haag	6	(0)
2022–2023	Telstar	29	(1)
2023–2024	TOP Oss	40	(0)
2025	Hegelmann	11	(0)
2025–	Slovácko	16	(0)
2025–	Slovácko B	13	(0)
2026–	→ Trenčín (loan)	2	(0)

International career^{‡}
2019	Israel U17	2	(0)
2023	Israel U21	5	(0)
- * Club domestic league appearances and goals as of 21 September 2026 ‡ National team caps and goals as of 15 October 2024

Jonathan Mulder (Hebrew: יהונתן מולדר; born 2 January 2002) is a professional footballer who plays as a left-back for Slovak side Trenčín, on loan from Czech First League club Slovácko. Born in the Netherlands, he has represented Israel at youth level.

== Early life ==
Mulder was born in Houten, Netherlands to a Dutch father and Israeli mother. They moved to Israel shortly after Jonathan's birth. The family returned to the Netherlands when Jonathan was a teenager. Jonathan's older brother, Michael, is also a footballer. While on the pitch together, the brothers will sometimes converse in Hebrew.

== Club career ==
=== ADO Den Haag ===
Mulder played in the youth academy of Maccabi Tel Aviv. After that, he returned to the Netherlands, where he played in the youth teams of AFC and AZ. In 2020, he left for ADO Den Haag as a free agent, signing a one-season contract. He initially played for the under-21 team of ADO, where his older brother Michaël also played.

Mulder made his professional debut in the first team of ADO Den Haag on 20 December 2020, in a 4–2 home loss in the Eredivisie against Ajax, replacing Boy Kemper shortly after the break.

=== Telstar ===
Mulder joined Telstar on 27 July 2022, signing a two-year deal after a successful trial. He made his competitive debut for the club on 8 August, immediately making an impact in the third minute of play by providing an assist to Koen Blommestijn's goal. On 3 February 2023, he scored his first professional goal, which proved to be decisive in Telstar's 1–0 victory against De Graafschap.

=== TOP Oss ===
On 26 July 2023, Mulder signed a one-year contract with an option for an additional year with Eerste Divisie club TOP Oss, after a successful trial.

=== Hegelmann ===
On 8 January 2025, he signed with Lithuanian Hegelmann Club.

=== Slovácko ===
On 10 July 2025, Mulder signed a 3-year contract with Czech First League club Slovácko until 2028.

== International career ==
Mulder has represented Israel at under-17 level, making his first international appearance in a friendly against Belarus.

== Career statistics ==
As of match played 22 December 2023

Appearances and goals by club, season and competition
Club	Season	League			KNVB Cup		Other		Total	
Club	Season	Division	Apps	Goals	Apps	Goals	Apps	Goals	Apps	Goals
ADO Den Haag	2020–21	Eredivisie	1	0	0	0	—		1	0
ADO Den Haag	2021–22	Eerste Divisie	5	0	3	0	—		1	0
ADO Den Haag	Total		6	0	3	0	—		9	0
Telstar	2022–23	Eerste Divisie	29	1	2	0	—		31	1
TOP Oss	2023–24	Eerste Divisie	17	0	1	0	—		18	0
Career total			52	1	6	0	0	0	58	1
