= Quinten van den Heerik =

Dutch footballer (born 2002)

Personal information
- Date of birth: 18 March 2002 (age 24)
- Place of birth: Alkmaar, Netherlands
- Height: 1.90 m (6 ft 3 in)
- Position: Striker

Youth career
- 2008–2018: Kolping Boys
- 2018–2019: DEM
- 2019–2022: PEC Zwolle

Senior career*
Years	Team	Apps	(Gls)
2022–2024	Telstar	35	(5)
2024–2026	Terrassa	57	(12)
- * Club domestic league appearances and goals as of 15 May 2026

Quinten van den Heerik (born 18 March 2002) is a Dutch professional footballer who plays as a striker.

== Career ==
=== Telstar ===
Van den Heerik was born in Alkmaar, North Holland, and played youth football for amateur clubs Kolping Boys and DEM until the age of 17. In November 2019, he penned a contract with PEC Zwolle that ran until the summer of 2022. Despite signing, he only found himself in the match selection on a few occasions without making his debut. Following the expiration of his contract, he moved to Telstar in 2022 after a successful trial.

On 8 August 2022, he made his professional debut for Telstar in a match against Jong Ajax, replacing club legend Glynor Plet in the 81st minute of a 1–1 away draw. However, it was in the final game of the season where he truly left his mark, netting his first two goals for Telstar. His brace played a pivotal role in securing a last-minute 2–1 victory against NAC Breda.

Van den Heerik signed a new contract with Telstar on 8 June 2023, keeping him at the club until 2024 with an option for an additional season. He swiftly earned a reputation as a "supersub" for the team, notably scoring stoppage-time winners against Jong Ajax and MVV in September and October 2023.

He left the club as a free agent at the end of the 2023–24 season after failing to reach an agreement for a new contract with Telstar.

=== Terrassa ===
On 16 May 2024, Van den Heerik joined Spanish Segunda Federación club Terrassa ahead of the 2024–25 season. He was the club's third signing for that season. On 8 September 2024, he scored twice as a substitute in a 3–1 away win over RCD Mallorca B. In January 2025, Golsmedia described him as one of the sensations of the Segunda Federación season. He had scored seven goals in 13 matches by then. On 11 January, he scored in the 89th minute of a 1–0 away win over Elche Ilicitano. It was his eighth goal of the season. The win moved Terrassa into the play-off places.

Van den Heerik stayed with Terrassa for the 2025–26 season. On 4 January 2026, he opened the scoring in a 2–0 home win over Valencia Mestalla. On 12 May 2026, Terrassa released Van den Heerik and nine other players ahead of the following season.

== Career statistics ==
As of match played 22 March 2026

Appearances and goals by club, season and competition
Club	Season	League			National cup (Note: Includes KNVB Cup, Copa Federación)		Other		Total	
Club	Season	Division	Apps	Goals	Apps	Goals	Apps	Goals	Apps	Goals
Telstar	2022–23	Eerste Divisie	8	2	0	0	—		8	2
Telstar	2023–24	Eerste Divisie	27	3	1	0	—		28	3
Telstar	Total		35	5	1	0	—		36	5
Terrassa	2024–25	Segunda Federación	30	9	1	0	—		31	9
Terrassa	2025–26	Segunda Federación	27	3	2	0	—		29	3
Terrassa	Total		57	12	3	0	—		60	12
Career total			92	17	4	0	0	0	96	17
