= Mees Kaandorp =

Dutch footballer (born 1998)

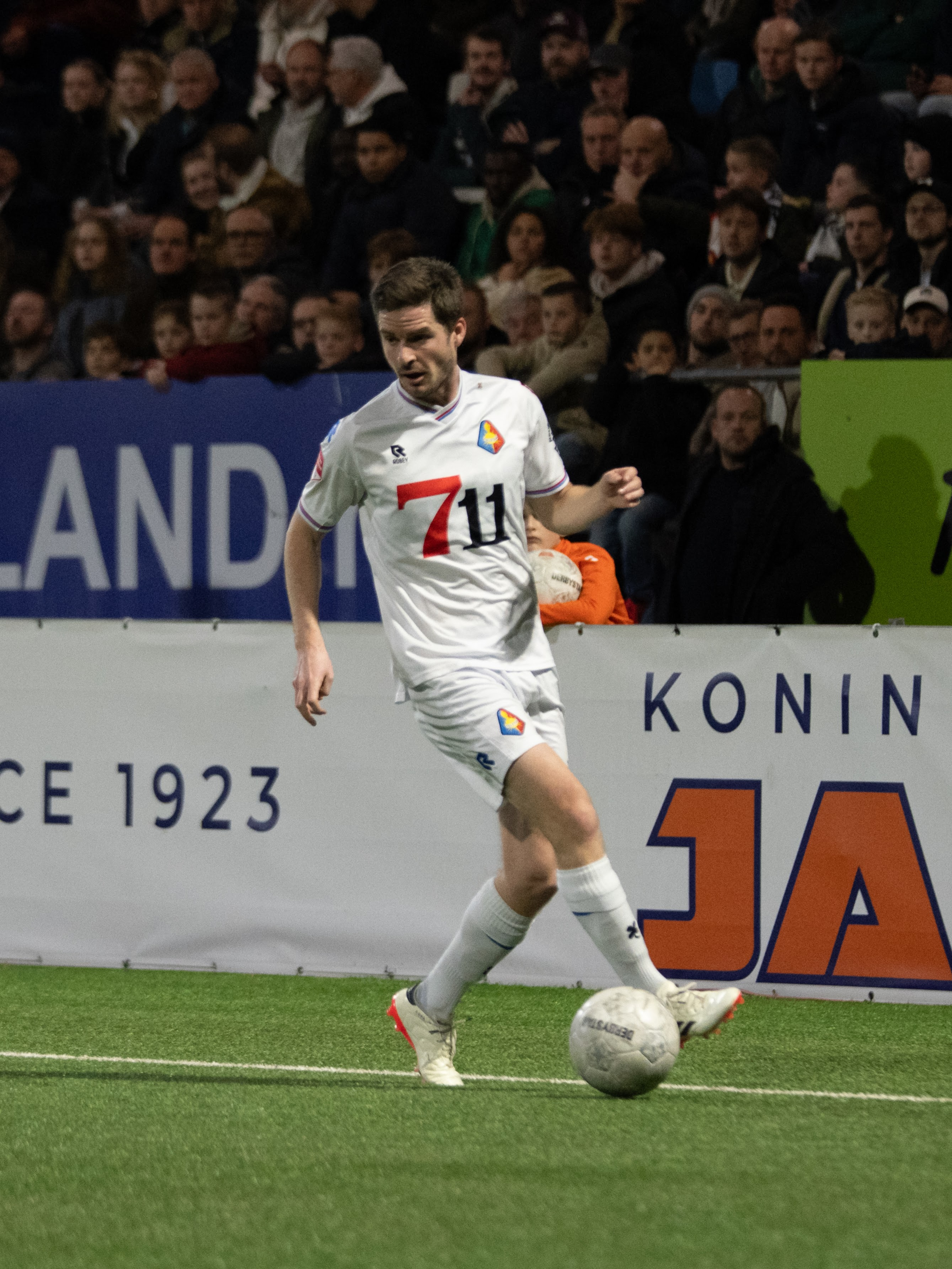
- Kaandorp with Telstar in 2025

Personal information
- Date of birth: 8 June 1998 (age 28)
- Place of birth: Heiloo, Netherlands
- Height: 1.74 m (5 ft 9 in)
- Position: Winger

Team information
- Current team: Wadi Degla
- Number: 34

Youth career
- –2009: HSV Heiloo
- 2009–2017: AZ

Senior career*
Years	Team	Apps	(Gls)
2017–2019	Jong AZ	43	(4)
2019	Jong Almere City	2	(1)
2019–2021	Almere City	54	(5)
2021–2023	De Graafschap	47	(5)
2023–2025	Telstar	47	(5)
2025–	Wadi Degla	10	(0)
- * Club domestic league appearances and goals as of 18:47, 12 October 2025 (UTC)

Mees Kaandorp (born 8 June 1998) is a Dutch professional footballer who plays as a winger for Egyptian Premier League club Wadi Degla.

== Club career ==
=== AZ ===
Kaandorp was born on 8 June 1998 in Heiloo, Netherlands. He started playing football at local club HSV, before joining AZ's youth academy in 2009.

He made his professional Eerste Divisie debut for the reserve team Jong AZ on 6 October 2017 in a game against Jong PSV, as a 72nd-minute substitute for Matthijs Hardijk. On 5 February 2018, he scored his first professional goal in a 3–1 victory against TOP Oss.

Kaandorp scored four goals in 43 appearances for Jong AZ. However, he failed to make his first-team debut for AZ.

=== Almere City ===
On 3 August 2019, Kaandorp signed a two-year contract with an option for an additional year with Eerste Divisie club Almere City. He made his debut for the club on 16 August, replacing Torino Hunte in the 89th minute of a 3–2 victory against Jong PSV. The following week, he made his debut for the reserve team, Jong Almere City, in the Derde Divisie, starting in a 6–0 win over ONS Sneek. On 27 September, Kaandorp scored his first goals for Almere, netting a brace to secure a 3–2 win over Dordrecht.

Kaandorp left the club after two seasons, during which he scored five goals in 54 appearances.

=== De Graafschap ===
On 20 July 2021, Kaandorp signed a two-year contract with an option for an additional year with De Graafschap. He made his debut on 7 August, the first matchday of the season, replacing Danny Verbeek in the 85th minute of a 3–0 home loss to Roda JC. On 25 March 2022, he scored his first goal for the Superboeren, which proved decisive in their 2–1 away win against Eindhoven. During the second half of the season, Kaandorp established himself as a starter, helping De Graafschap reach the promotion play-offs. Despite scoring in the second leg against Eindhoven, his team conceded two early goals and lost 3–1, resulting in a 4–2 aggregate defeat and elimination in the first round.

In the following season, Kaandorp initially lost his starting spot under new head coach Adrie Poldervaart but reclaimed it in November 2022. After Poldervaart was hospitalised with Guillain–Barré syndrome, Kaandorp once again lost his place under caretaker Richard Roelofsen. In May 2023, it was announced that Kaandorp would leave De Graafschap at the end of the season. He scored five goals in 51 appearances during his time at the club.

=== Telstar ===
Kaandorp joined Eerste Divisie club Telstar on 3 August 2023, where he signed a two-year deal. Upon signing, head coach Mike Snoei stated, that he expected Kaandorp to take on a significant role in his team: "his experience is anticipated to contribute to our attacking creativity". He made his debut for the club on 14 August, the first matchday of the season, coming on as a second-half substitute for Tom Overtoom in a 1–0 away loss to Jong PSV. On 22 September, he scored his first goal for Telstar in a 1–1 away draw against ADO Den Haag. He suffered a groin injury in October 2023, ruling him out for five months before making his comeback in March 2024.

Kaandorp established himself as a starter under new head coach Anthony Correia at the start of the 2024–25 season. He scored three goals during the regular league campaign and played a pivotal role in the promotion play-offs. In the final against Willem II, Kaandorp provided an assist and scored twice in a 3–1 second-leg victory, securing Telstar's promotion to the Eredivisie.

=== Wadi Degla ===
On 8 August 2025, Kaandorp joined newly promoted Egyptian Premier League club Wadi Degla. He made his debut the same day, replacing Mohamed Abdelaati in the 66th minute of a 0–0 home draw against Pyramids.

== Career statistics ==
As of match played 5 October 2025

Appearances and goals by club, season and competition
Club	Season	League			Cup		Other		Total	
Club	Season	Division	Apps	Goals	Apps	Goals	Apps	Goals	Apps	Goals
Jong AZ	2017–18	Eerste Divisie	23	3	—		—		23	3
Jong AZ	2018–19	Eerste Divisie	20	1	—		—		20	1
Jong AZ	Total		43	4	—		—		43	4
Jong Almere City	2019–20	Derde Divisie	2	1	—		—		2	1
Almere City	2019–20	Eerste Divisie	25	3	1	0	—		26	3
Almere City	2020–21	Eerste Divisie	29	2	1	0	1 (Note: Appearance(s) in Eerste Divisie promotion play-offs)	0	31	2
Almere City	Total		54	5	2	0	1	0	57	5
De Graafschap	2021–22	Eerste Divisie	22	2	0	0	2	1	24	3
De Graafschap	2022–23	Eerste Divisie	25	3	2	0	—		27	3
De Graafschap	Total		47	5	2	0	2	1	51	5
Telstar	2023–24	Eerste Divisie	18	3	0	0	—		18	3
Telstar	2024–25	Eerste Divisie	29	3	1	0	6	2	36	5
Telstar	Total		47	6	1	0	6	2	54	8
Wadi Degla	2025–26	Egyptian Premier League	10	0	0	0	—		10	0
Career total			203	21	5	0	9	3	217	24
