= Mohammed Tahiri =

Dutch footballer (born 2001)

Personal information
- Date of birth: 22 January 2001 (age 25)
- Place of birth: Rotterdam, Netherlands
- Height: 1.77 m (5 ft 10 in)
- Position: Forward

Team information
- Current team: Katwijk
- Number: 19

Youth career
- –2014: Spartaan '20
- 2014–2020: Sparta Rotterdam

Senior career*
Years	Team	Apps	(Gls)
2018–2023	Jong Sparta	82	(27)
2021–2023	Sparta Rotterdam	6	(0)
2023–2024	Telstar	28	(5)
2024–	Katwijk	47	(12)

International career
2015–2016	Netherlands U15	6	(0)
2019	Netherlands U18	1	(0)
- * Club domestic league appearances and goals as of 10:56, 19 December 2025 (UTC)

Mohammed Tahiri (Arabic: محمد التاهيري; born 22 January 2001) is a Dutch professional footballer who plays as a forward for Tweede Divisie club Katwijk.

== Club career ==
=== Sparta Rotterdam ===
Tahiri started playing football in the youth ranks of Spartaan '20 before joining Sparta Rotterdam's youth academy at age 12. He made his senior debut for the reserve team, Jong Sparta, in the third-tier Tweede Divisie on 17 November 2018, scoring his first goal within six minutes in a 7–1 away victory against Lienden. On 19 January 2019, he signed his first professional contract with the club, a deal until 2021. He played several seasons for Jong Sparta, scoring 27 goals in 82 appearances. On 20 October 2022, he made his professional debut for Sparta's first team, starting in a 3–1 win over OFC in the KNVB Cup. He made his Eredivisie debut on 24 January 2023, replacing Sven Mijnans late in a 0–0 home draw against RKC Waalwijk.

=== Telstar ===
After his contract with Sparta expired, Tahiri trialled with Eerste Divisie club Telstar. Impressing the Telstar staff, he signed a one-year contract with an option for an additional season on 9 August 2023.

On 14 August 2023, Tahiri made his debut for Telstar in an away match against Jong PSV. He came on as a substitute for Youssef El Kachati in the 70th minute, as the match ended in a 1–0 loss. He scored five goals in 29 appearances for Telstar.

=== Katwijk ===
On 20 May 2024, Tahiri joined Tweede Divisie club Katwijk on a two-year deal, after his contract with Telstar was not extended.

== International career ==
Tahiri is a Netherlands youth international. He has gained caps for the national under-15 and under-18 sides.

== Career statistics ==
As of match played 10 May 2024

Appearances and goals by club, season and competition
Club	Season	League			National cup		Other		Total	
Club	Season	Division	Apps	Goals	Apps	Goals	Apps	Goals	Apps	Goals
Jong Sparta	2018–19	Tweede Divisie	12	3	—		—		12	3
Jong Sparta	2019–20	Tweede Divisie	21	6	—		—		21	6
Jong Sparta	2020–21	Tweede Divisie	5	0	—		—		5	0
Jong Sparta	2021–22	Tweede Divisie	29	8	—		—		29	8
Jong Sparta	2022–23	Tweede Divisie	15	10	—		—		15	10
Jong Sparta	Total		82	27	—		—		82	27
Sparta Rotterdam	2022–23	Eredivisie	6	0	2	0	1 (Note: Appearance(s) in Eredivisie play-offs)	0	9	0
Telstar	2023–24	Eerste Divisie	28	5	1	0	—		29	5
Career total			116	32	3	0	1	0	120	32
