= Jorginho Soares =

Cape Verdean footballer (born 1999)

Personal information
- Date of birth: 18 July 1999 (age 27)
- Place of birth: Spijkenisse, Netherlands
- Height: 1.94 m (6 ft 4 in)
- Position: Centre-back

Team information
- Current team: Feronikeli
- Number: 44

Youth career
- VV Spijkenisse
- –2016: Dordrecht
- 2016–2017: VV Spijkenisse
- 2017–2020: Heerenveen

Senior career*
Years	Team	Apps	(Gls)
2017	VV Spijkenisse		
2021–2022	ASWH	21	(1)
2022–2024	Telstar	32	(0)
2024	→ Terrassa (loan)	12	(0)
2024–2026	Emmen	19	(0)
2026	Montana	18	(1)
2026–	Feronikeli	3	(0)

International career^{‡}
2026–	Cape Verde	1	(0)
- * Club domestic league appearances and goals as of 08:17, 4 November 2026 (UTC) ‡ National team caps and goals as of 15:21, 27 March 2026 (UTC)

Jorginho Soares (Portuguese: [ʒɔɾ.ˈʒi.ɲu su.ˈa.ɾɨʃ]; born 25 September 2002) is a professional footballer who plays as a defender for Kosovo Superleague club Feronikeli. Born in the Netherlands, he plays for the Cape Verde national team.

== Career ==
=== Early years ===
Soares played youth football in the youth teams of Dordrecht and VV Spijkenisse. As a 17-year-old, he made his debut for Spijkenisse's first team in the Hoofdklasse, and helped the team win the title of the 2016–17 Saturday A division. In 2017, at the age of 18, he moved to SC Heerenveen's academy. However, due in part to injuries, he never made his breakthrough at that club.

=== ASWH ===
In December 2021, after more than a year without a club, Soares joined Tweede Divisie club ASWH. He made his debut for the club on 12 February 2022, starting in a 3–1 victory against GVVV. He remained a starter from then on, and extended his contract with the club on 20 February 2022. On 12 March, he scored his first senior goal in a 2–2 home draw against Koninklijke HFC.

=== Telstar ===
On 14 July 2022, Soares signed a one-year contract with an option for two additional years with Eerste Divisie club Telstar after a successful trial. He made his professional debut on 8 August 2022, replacing Mihkel Ainsalu in the 81st minute of a 1–1 draw against Jong Ajax.

On 29 March 2023, Telstar announced the extension of Soares' contract, keeping him at the club until 2025.

On 1 February 2024, Soares moved on loan to Terrassa, playing in the Spanish fourth-tier Segunda Federación. He returned to Telstar at the end of the season after making 12 appearances for Terrassa.

=== Emmen ===
On 19 July 2024, Soares signed a contract with Emmen for two seasons, with an option for a third. The contract was mutually terminated on 2 December 2025.

=== Montana ===
On 14 January 2026, Soares joined Montana in Bulgaria.

== International career ==
Born in the Netherlands, Soares holds Cape Verdean citizenship. He was called up to the Cape Verde national teams for a set of friendlies in March 2026.

== Career statistics ==
As of match played 22 May 2025

Appearances and goals by club, season and competition
Club	Season	League			KNVB Cup		Other		Total	
Club	Season	Division	Apps	Goals	Apps	Goals	Apps	Goals	Apps	Goals
ASWH	2021–22	Tweede Divisie	21	1	0	0	—		21	1
Telstar	2022–23	Eerste Divisie	15	0	2	0	—		17	0
Telstar	2023–24	Eerste Divisie	17	0	1	0	—		18	0
Telstar	Total		32	0	3	0	—		35	0
Terrassa (loan)	2023–24	Segunda Federación	12	0	—		—		12	0
Emmen	2024–25	Eerste Divisie	19	0	0	0	—		19	0
Montana	2025–26	Parva Liga	18	1	0	0	—		18	1
Career total			102	2	3	0	0	0	105	2

== Honours ==
VV Spijkenisse

- Hoofdklasse Saturday A: 2016–17
