= Jay Kruiver =

Dutch footballer (born 2001)

Personal information
- Date of birth: 2 May 2001 (age 25)
- Place of birth: Zaandam, Netherlands
- Height: 1.75 m (5 ft 9 in)
- Position: Right-back

Team information
- Current team: Osijek
- Number: 22

Youth career
- –2011: ZVV Zaanlandia
- 2011–2015: Ajax
- 2015–2020: Volendam

Senior career*
Years	Team	Apps	(Gls)
2018–2022	Jong Volendam	34	(1)
2020–2022	Volendam	1	(0)
2022–2024	Telstar	58	(1)
2024–2026	Roda JC	71	(4)
2026–	Osijek	2	(0)
- * Club domestic league appearances and goals as of 18:52, 7 October 2026 (UTC)

Jay Kruiver (born 2 May 2001) is a Dutch professional footballer who plays as a right-back for Croatian Football League club Osijek.

== Career ==
=== Volendam ===
Born in Zaandam, Kruiver played youth football for ZVV Zaanlandia, Ajax and Volendam. Promoted to the reserve side Jong Volendam in 2018, he made his senior debut on 13 January 2019 in a Derde Divisie match against HSC '21, and scored his first goal on 26 September 2020, in a 4–3 Tweede Divisie defeat away to IJsselmeervogels.

His only appearance for the Volendam first team came on 15 March 2021, as a 68th-minute substitute for Mohamed Betti in a 1–0 Eerste Divisie defeat at NEC.

=== Telstar ===
On the closing day of the January 2022 transfer window, Kruiver joined league rivals Telstar on a free transfer, signing a six-month contract with an option for two further seasons. The club took up the option in March, tying him to Velsen-Zuid until 2024, and he established himself as the first-choice right wing-back. He made 59 appearances in two and a half seasons, scoring once; in his final campaign he played 21 matches, with a goal and three assists.

=== Roda JC ===
Kruiver joined Roda JC on a free transfer on 11 June 2024, signing until mid-2026 with an option for a further year. Manager of football affairs Rob Servais described him as an attack-minded full-back who knew the division and had room to develop. He made his debut on 12 August, starting the opening fixture of the season under Bas Sibum in a 6–1 defeat away to Jong AZ.

He was a regular at right-back across both seasons in Kerkrade, playing 35 matches in his first and 40 in his second, the latter including both legs of the promotion play-offs, and scoring five goals in total. Roda took up the option on his contract, which was due to run to 2027.

=== Osijek ===
On 8 September 2026, Kruiver signed a two-year contract, with a further one-year option, with Croatian Football League club Osijek, where he took the number 22 shirt.

== Career statistics ==
As of match played 25 October 2024

Appearances and goals by club, season and competition
Club	Season	League			KNVB Cup		Other		Total	
Club	Season	Division	Apps	Goals	Apps	Goals	Apps	Goals	Apps	Goals
Jong Volendam	2018–19	Derde Divisie	8	0	—		—		8	0
Jong Volendam	2019–20	Tweede Divisie	10	0	—		—		10	0
Jong Volendam	2020–21	Tweede Divisie	5	1	—		—		5	1
Jong Volendam	2021–22	Tweede Divisie	11	0	—		—		11	0
Jong Volendam	Total		34	1	—		—		34	1
Volendam	2020–21	Eerste Divisie	1	0	0	0	0	0	1	0
Telstar	2021–22	Eerste Divisie	12	0	0	0	—		12	0
Telstar	2022–23	Eerste Divisie	25	0	1	0	—		26	0
Telstar	2023–24	Eerste Divisie	21	1	0	0	—		21	1
Telstar	Total		58	1	1	0	—		59	1
Roda JC	2024–25	Eerste Divisie	12	1	0	0	—		12	1
Career total			105	3	1	0	0	0	106	3
