= Dajour Buffonge =

Montserratian footballer (born 1996)

Personal information
- Full name: Dajour McIntosh-Buffonge
- Date of birth: 29 January 1996 (age 30)
- Place of birth: London, England
- Position: Defender

Youth career
- Charlton Athletic
- –2012: Tottenham Hotspur

Senior career*
Years	Team	Apps	(Gls)
2012–2015	Hertford Town	62	(4)
2015–2016	Bedford		
2016	Darwen		
- Atherton Collieries
2018	Congleton Town	2	(0)
2018	Egerton	4	(0)
2018–2019	Glossop North End	0	(0)
2019	Congleton Town	2	(0)
2019	Ware	3	(0)
2019–2020	Northwood		

International career^{‡}
2015	Montserrat	1	(0)
- * Club domestic league appearances and goals as of 10:00, 5 January 2019 (UTC) ‡ National team caps and goals as of 10:00, 24 May 2015 (UTC)

Dajour Mcintosh-Buffonge (born 29 January 1996) is a Montserratian former footballer who played as a defender.

== Career ==
=== Club career ===
Buffonge progressed through the youth ranks of Charlton Athletic and Tottenham Hotspur, before his release in 2012. He joined Hertford Town ahead of the 2012–13 season and became a regular in the side immediately.

Making 20 appearances in his opening two seasons, Buffonge then claimed the club's Young Player of the Year award for the 2014–15 season with four goals in 39 games. He then lined-up a further 26 times for the Blues during his 2015–16 campaign.

In December 2019, Buffonge joined Northwood.

=== International career ===
Buffonge made his international debut for Montserrat on 27 March 2015, featuring in a 2–1 defeat to Curaçao during 2018 World Cup qualification. In September 2018, he received another call-up to the national team whilst playing for Redbridge.

== Personal life ==
Buffonge is the older brother of DJ Buffonge, who joined Manchester United in November 2015.
