= Mohamed Betti =

Dutch footballer (born 1997)

Personal information
- Date of birth: 19 March 1997 (age 29)
- Place of birth: Amsterdam, Netherlands
- Height: 1.79 m (5 ft 10 in)
- Position: Right-back

Youth career
- –2013: DWS
- 2013–2016: Volendam

Senior career*
Years	Team	Apps	(Gls)
2016–2021	Jong Volendam	27	(1)
2016–2021	Volendam	89	(0)
2022–2023	AFC	13	(0)
- * Club domestic league appearances and goals as of 10:04, 23 July 2023 (UTC)

Mohamed Betti (born 19 March 1997) is a Dutch professional footballer who plays as a right-back.

== Club career ==
He made his professional debut in the Eerste Divisie for FC Volendam on 21 October 2016 in a game against Jong Ajax.

== Personal life ==
Born in the Netherlands, Betti is of Moroccan descent.
