= Yaël Liesdek =

Dutch footballer (born 2001)

Personal information
- Date of birth: 21 October 2001 (age 25)
- Place of birth: Amsterdam, Netherlands
- Height: 1.83 m (6 ft 0 in)
- Position: Right-back

Team information
- Current team: MVV Maastricht
- Number: 25

Youth career
- GeuzenMiddenmeer
- UVV Utrecht
- Zeeburgia
- –2016: Alphense Boys
- 2016–2018: Roda JC
- 2018–2019: Hollandia
- 2019–2020: De Volewijckers

Senior career*
| Years | Team | Apps | (Gls) |
| 2021–2024 | Telstar | 56 | (2) |
| 2024–2025 | AB | 12 | (0) |
| 2026– | MVV Maastricht | 1 | (0) |
- * Club domestic league appearances and goals as of 3 October 2026

Yaël Liesdek (born 21 October 2001) is a Dutch professional footballer who plays as a right-back for Eerste Divisie club MVV Maastricht.

== Career ==
=== Early years ===
Liesdek played youth football for GeuzenMiddenmeer, UVV Utrecht, Zeeburgia, Alphense Boys, Roda JC, Hollandia, and De Volewijckers.

=== Telstar ===
In 2020, he joined Telstar after being scouted by head coach Andries Jonker, who had noticed Liesdek at his former club De Volewijckers. On 30 August 2020, Liesdek made his professional debut during a home match against Volendam, which ended in a 2–2 draw. Coming on as a substitute for Glynor Plet in the 85th minute, he stepped onto the field for the first time in his paid football career. In the subsequent game, an away fixture against Eindhoven, he earned his first starting position and provided an assist to Shayne Pattynama's equalizer as Telstar went on to win 3–2. He scored his first professional goal on 22 September in a league game against Excelsior, deciding the game by placing the ball into the bottom corner beyond the reach of the opposing goalkeeper, Alessandro Damen, in the 95th minute. In December 2020, he signed a contract extension with Telstar until 2023. In the second half of the season, Liesdek suffered successive injuries which limited his playing time. He ended his first season in professional football with one goal in 21 appearances.

After playing regularly for the first half of the 2021–22 season, Liesdek was subbed off in the 76th minute of a 2–1 loss to Volendam on 9 January 2022 with an achilles tendon injury which sidelined him for the rest of the season. In October 2022, he dislocated his shoulder which kept him out for two months. His return was short-lived, as he tore his achilles tendon in a 3–1 defeat to ADO Den Haag on 31 March 2023, effectively ending his season.

=== Akademisk Boldklub ===
On 25 July 2024, Danish 2nd Division club Akademisk Boldklub (AB), confirmed that Liesdek had joined the club. He made his debut for the club on 3 August, replacing an injured Hørður Askham shortly after half-time in a 1–1 home draw against Næstved. He left the club in June 2025, after his contract was terminated by mutual agreement.

=== MVV Maastricht ===
After not playing for over a year, on 25 September 2026 Liesdek signed with MVV Maastricht until the end of the season, to help the injury-depleted squad.

== Personal life ==
Liesdek is the youngest son of former footballer Marcel Liesdek who captained the Colourful 11, an exhibition team of Surinamese players playing professionally in the Netherlands. Fifteen members of the Colourful 11 tragically lost their lives in 1989 as a result of the Surinam Airways Flight 764 disaster. As Marcel Liesdek was in contract negotiations with his former club Fortuna Sittard at the time, he was not on the plane.

== Career statistics ==
As of match played 26 April 2025

Appearances and goals by club, season and competition
| Club | Season | League | | | KNVB Cup | | Other | | Total | |
| Club | Season | Division | Apps | Goals | Apps | Goals | Apps | Goals | Apps | Goals |
|---|---|---|---|---|---|---|---|---|---|---|
| Telstar | 2020–21 | Eerste Divisie | 20 | 1 | 1 | 0 | — | | 21 | 1 |
| Telstar | 2021–22 | Eerste Divisie | 20 | 0 | 2 | 0 | — | | 22 | 0 |
| Telstar | 2022–23 | Eerste Divisie | 13 | 1 | 1 | 0 | — | | 14 | 1 |
| Telstar | 2023–24 | Eerste Divisie | 3 | 0 | 0 | 0 | — | | 3 | 0 |
| Telstar | Total | | 56 | 2 | 4 | 0 | 0 | 0 | 60 | 2 |
| AB | 2024–25 | Danish 2nd Division | 13 | 0 | 0 | 0 | — | | 13 | 0 |
| Career total | | | 69 | 2 | 4 | 0 | 0 | 0 | 73 | 2 |
