= Achraf Madi =

Dutch footballer (born 2002)

Personal information
- Date of birth: 27 June 2002 (age 24)
- Place of birth: Amsterdam-West, Netherlands
- Height: 1.78 m (5 ft 10 in)
- Position: Midfielder

Youth career
- –2013: Buitenveldert
- 2013–2016: Utrecht
- 2016–2017: AFC
- 2017–2020: Twente
- 2020–2021: Sparta Rotterdam

Senior career*
Years	Team	Apps	(Gls)
2021–2023	Jong Sparta Rotterdam	54	(7)
2022–2023	Sparta Rotterdam	1	(0)
2023	Telstar	2	(0)
2023–2024	Saguntino	11	(0)
2024–2025	Albacete B	6	(1)
- * Club domestic league appearances and goals as of 05:37, 24 October 2024 (UTC)

Achraf Madi (Arabic: أشرف ماضي; born 27 June 2002) is a Dutch professional footballer who plays as a midfielder. Born in the Netherlands, he is of Moroccan descent.

== Career ==
=== Sparta Rotterdam ===
Madi played youth football for Buitenveldert, Utrecht, AFC, Twente and Sparta Rotterdam. In 2020, he was promoted to Sparta's reserve team, Jong Sparta Rotterdam, competing in the Dutch third tier. He made his senior debut on 22 August 2021, the first matchday of the season, starting in a 1–1 draw against De Treffers. In the following game, on 28 August, he scored his first goal, opening the score in a convincing 6–2 victory against Jong Volendam.

Madi's performances for the second team earned him a place in the first team, and he made his professional debut on 15 December 2021, replacing Mario Engels in the 73rd minute of a KNVB Cup loss to Vitesse. He made his league debut the following month, coming off the bench for Tom Beugelsdijk late in a 3–0 home defeat against Utrecht.

=== Telstar ===
On 30 January 2023, Madi signed a six-month contract with Eerste Divisie club Telstar. He made his debut for the club on 17 February 2023, replacing Tom Overtoom in a 1–1 league draw against Jong PSV.

=== Saguntino ===
On 1 September 2023, Madi signed with Saguntino in the Spanish fourth-tier Segunda Federación.

=== Albacete B ===
He moved to Albacete B during the summer of 2024, making his debut for Queso Mecánico on 8 September, coming on as a second-half substitute in a 1–1 away draw against Toledo.

== Personal life ==
Born in the Netherlands, Madi is of Moroccan descent.

== Career statistics ==
As of match played 15 September 2024

Appearances and goals by club, season and competition
Club	Season	League			KNVB Cup		Other		Total	
Club	Season	Division	Apps	Goals	Apps	Goals	Apps	Goals	Apps	Goals
Jong Sparta Rotterdam	2021–22	Tweede Divisie	34	2	—		—		34	2
Jong Sparta Rotterdam	2022–23	Tweede Divisie	20	5	—		—		20	5
Jong Sparta Rotterdam	Total		54	7	—		—		54	7
Sparta Rotterdam	2021–22	Eredivisie	1	0	1	0	—		2	0
Telstar	2022–23	Eerste Divisie	2	0	0	0	—		2	0
Saguntino	2023–24	Segunda Federación	11	0	0	0	—		11	0
Albacete B	2024–25	Tercera Federación	2	0	—		—		2	0
Career total			75	7	1	0	0	0	76	7
