= Michael Mulder =

Dutch footballer (born 2001)

Personal information
- Date of birth: 10 January 2001 (age 25)
- Place of birth: Houten, Netherlands
- Height: 1.88 m (6 ft 2 in)
- Position: Midfielder

Youth career
- –2019: FC Utrecht
- 2020: Maccabi Petah Tikva

Senior career*
Years	Team	Apps	(Gls)
2020–2023	ADO	27	(0)
2022	→ Beveren (loan)	0	(0)
2023–2024	Panachaiki	13	(0)
2024	HB Køge	4	(0)
- * Club domestic league appearances and goals as of 16:00, 23 January 2025 (UTC)

Michael Mulder (born 10 January 2001) is a Dutch footballer who plays as a midfielder.

== Career ==
As a youth player, Mulder joined the youth academy of Dutch top flight side FC Utrecht. Before the second half of 2019–20, he joined the youth academy of Maccabi Petah Tikva in the Israeli second tier. In 2020, Mulder signed for Dutch club ADO Den Haag, where he made 27 league appearances. On 5 September 2021, he debuted for ADO during a 4–2 win over FC Eindhoven.

In 2022, Mulder signed for Beveren in Belgium.

On September 16, 2024, Danish 1st Division club HB Køge confirmed that Mulder, after a few weeks of trial training, had signed with the club.
