= Cain Seedorf =

Dutch footballer (born 2000)

Personal information
- Date of birth: 19 January 2000 (age 26)
- Place of birth: Almere, Netherlands
- Height: 1.78 m (5 ft 10 in)
- Positions: Right-back; right winger

Team information
- Current team: Roda JC
- Number: 7

Youth career
- 2009–2010: Ajax
- 2010–2012: Zeeburgia
- 2012–2014: Almere City
- 2014–2015: Zeeburgia
- 2015–2019: Heerenveen
- 2019–2021: ADO Den Haag

Senior career*
Years	Team	Apps	(Gls)
2019–2020	Jong ADO Den Haag	17	(3)
2021–2022	ADO Den Haag	23	(0)
2022–2024	Telstar	61	(2)
2024–	Roda JC	48	(8)
- * Club domestic league appearances and goals as of 25 April 2026

Cain Seedorf (born 19 January 2000) is a Dutch professional footballer who plays as a right-back or right winger for Eerste Divisie club Roda JC.

== Career ==
=== ADO Den Haag ===
Seedorf started his youth career in the famous Ajax academy, before being cut and moving to Zeeburgia in 2010. After two seasons at Almere City, he returned to Zeeburgia before being scouted by Heerenveen in 2015. Four years later, ADO Den Haag signed him, and at that club, he signed his first professional contract on 19 May 2020. He made his debut for the reserves, Jong ADO Den Haag, in the Derde Divisie on 1 September 2019, replacing Killian van Mil in the 60th minute of a 5–0 away defeat against OSS '20. On 1 December 2019, he scored his first goal for the reserves, helping secure a 2–2 away draw against Hoogland. He scored his first brace on 26 January 2020, helping Jong ADO to a league win over UNA.

On 4 April 2021, he made his professional debut for ADO, starting in a 4–1 Eredivisie loss to Utrecht. The team suffered relegation at the end of the season for the first time since 2007, with Seedorf making three appearances.

The following season, with ADO in the Eerste Divisie, Seedorf played more regularly. He also scored his first professional goal, helping the team to a 4–2 victory in the KNVB Cup against Gemert on 14 December 2021. In total, he scored once in 22 appearances as ADO were close to promoting back to the Eredivisie. A penalty shootout loss to Excelsior in the play-off final eventually saw them miss out on a quick return to the top tier.

=== Telstar ===
Seedorf joined Eerste Divisie club Telstar in July 2022, signing a one-year amateur deal with the club. He made his competitive debut for the club on 8 August 2022, replacing Tom Overtoom in the 62nd minute of a 1–1 away draw against Jong Ajax on the first matchday of the season. Mainly a substitute through the season, Seedorf made 25 appearances as the team finished ninth in the league table – only five points from promotion play-offs.

In June 2023, Seedorf signed a professional contract extension with Telstar, keeping him at the club until 2024 with an option for another season.

=== Roda JC ===
On 2 September 2024, Seedorf signed a three-year contract with Roda JC.

== Personal life ==
Seedorf is a member of the Seedorf family with roots in Suriname. He is the nephew of the footballers Clarence, Jürgen, and Chedric Seedorf. He is also the cousin of the footballers Stefano, Collin, and Regilio Seedorf.

== Career statistics ==
As of match played 30 October 2024

Appearances and goals by club, season and competition
Club	Season	League			KNVB Cup		Other		Total	
Club	Season	Division	Apps	Goals	Apps	Goals	Apps	Goals	Apps	Goals
Jong ADO Den Haag	2019–20	Derde Divisie	17	3	—		—		17	3
ADO Den Haag	2020–21	Eredivisie	3	0	0	0	—		3	0
ADO Den Haag	2021–22	Eerste Divisie	20	0	2	1	0	0	22	1
ADO Den Haag	Total		23	0	2	1	0	0	25	1
Telstar	2022–23	Eerste Divisie	24	0	1	0	—		25	0
Telstar	2023–24	Eerste Divisie	33	2	1	0	—		34	2
Telstar	Total		57	2	2	0	0	0	59	2
Roda JC	2024–25	Eerste Divisie	7	1	1	1	—		8	2
Career total			104	6	5	2	0	0	109	8
