= Ronald Koeman Jr. =

Dutch footballer (born 1995)

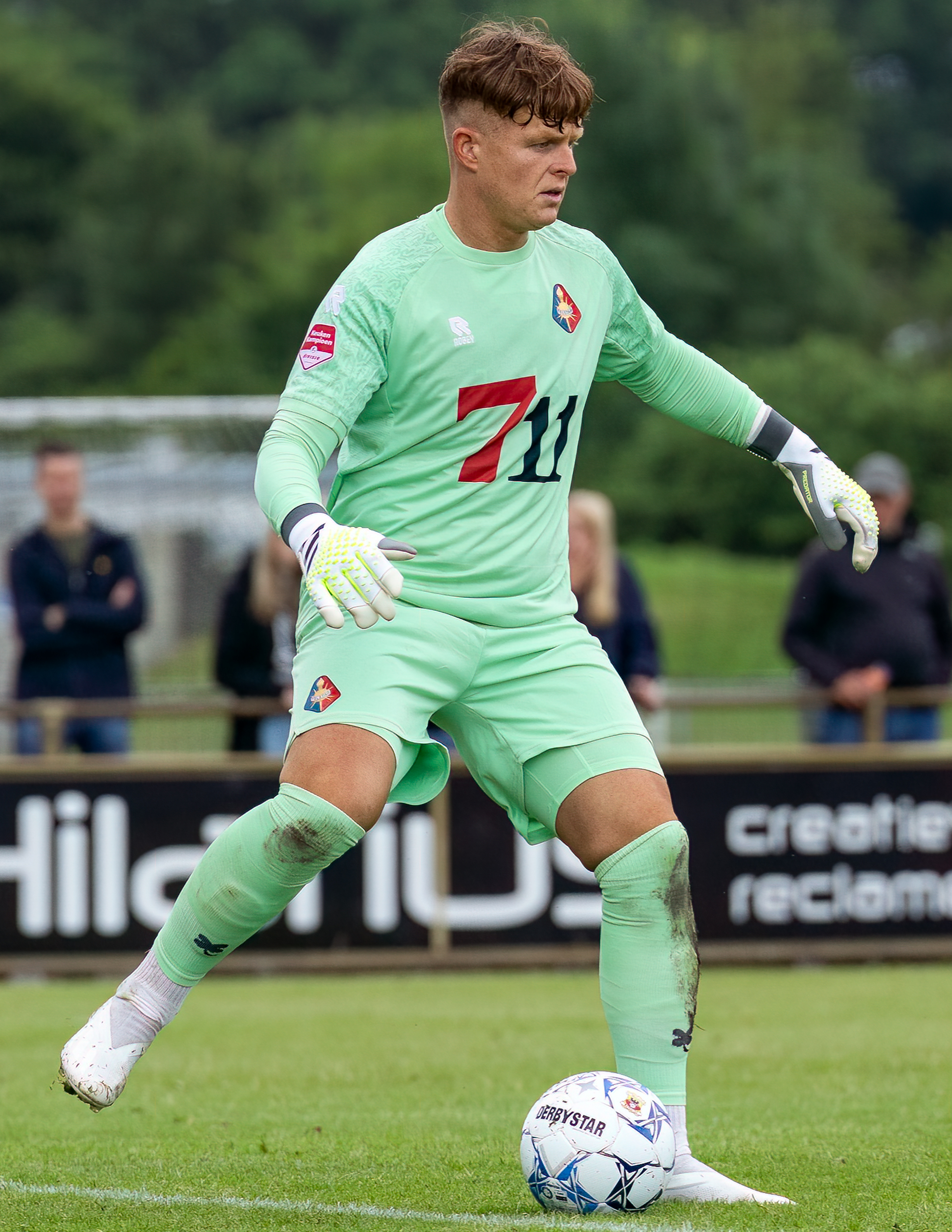
- Koeman Jr. in 2024

Personal information
- Date of birth: 23 May 1995 (age 31)
- Place of birth: Barcelona, Spain
- Height: 1.88 m (6 ft 2 in)
- Position: Goalkeeper

Team information
- Current team: Telstar
- Number: 1

Youth career
- Almere City

Senior career*
Years	Team	Apps	(Gls)
2012–2015	Almere City	0	(0)
2015–2021	TOP Oss (Note: FC Oss changed its name to TOP Oss in 2018.)	37	(0)
2021–	Telstar	151	(3)
- * Club domestic league appearances and goals as of 13 September 2026

Ronald Koeman Jr. (born 23 May 1995) is a Dutch professional footballer who plays as a goalkeeper for Eredivisie club Telstar.

== Career ==
=== TOP Oss ===
Koeman came through the youth system at Almere City but never made an appearance for the first team. In 2015, he moved to FC Oss to increase his chances at first team playing time. He made his debut on 29 April 2016 in an Eerste Divisie game against FC Volendam as a substitute, coming on in the 83rd minute for Xavier Mous in a 2–1 home defeat.

=== Telstar ===
On 25 June 2021, it was announced that Koeman had signed with Telstar. On 10 September, he made his debut for the club in a league match against Almere City, his former team, which ended in a 1–1 draw. He took over the goalkeeping duties from Trevor Doornbusch after head coach Andries Jonker decided to bench him due to a series of significant errors in previous games. Following that, he continued as a starter, except for a setback in October 2021 when he sustained an injury that kept him out of action for the remainder of the year.

On 13 January 2023, he received the first red card of his professional career after a reckless challenge outside the penalty area against Nick Koster of Jong AZ.

Koeman suffered a second wrist injury during training in September 2023, sidelining him for several months. He extended his contract with Telstar on 29 May 2024, signing a one-year deal until 30 June 2025.

In the 2024–25 season, Koeman played every minute of Telstar's 38 league matches, two KNVB Cup ties, and all four promotion play-off fixtures. He kept a clean sheet in a 2–0 win over ADO Den Haag and helped secure a 3–1 second-leg victory against Willem II in the final, earning Telstar promotion to the Eredivisie for the first time in 47 years.

Koeman made his Eredivisie debut on 10 August 2025, starting in a 2–0 defeat away to Ajax at the Johan Cruyff Arena. On 30 August, he kept a clean sheet in a 2–0 away win over PSV, Telstar's first Eredivisie victory since 1978. His performance drew praise, with analysts Kenneth Perez and Karim El Ahmadi suggesting he could be considered as a third-choice for the Netherlands national team, while highlighting his distribution and composure. On 17 May 2026, he scored a late penalty in Telstar's 2–1 away victory over FC Volendam on the final matchday of the 2025–26 season, securing the club's survival in the Eredivisie. In a post-match interview, he revealed that he had been the club's first choice penalty taker for some time.

On 2 July 2026, Koeman signed a new contract with Telstar, keeping him at the club until 2028.

On 6 September 2026, Koeman became the first goalkeeper in Eredivise history to score two goals in a single game, rescuing a point with a brace of penalties against Cambuur.

== Personal life ==
He is the son of former Netherlands national team manager Ronald Koeman. He is the nephew of former Dutch international football player Erwin Koeman, and the grandson of former Dutch international Martin Koeman.

== Career statistics ==
As of match played 17 May 2026

Appearances and goals by club, season and competition
Club	Season	League			KNVB Cup		Other		Total	
Club	Season	Division	Apps	Goals	Apps	Goals	Apps	Goals	Apps	Goals
Almere City	2014–15	Eerste Divisie	0	0	0	0	0	0	0	0
TOP Oss	2015–16	Eerste Divisie	1	0	0	0	—		1	0
TOP Oss	2016–17	Eerste Divisie	15	0	1	0	—		16	0
TOP Oss	2017–18	Eerste Divisie	0	0	1	0	—		1	0
TOP Oss	2018–19	Eerste Divisie	9	0	0	0	2 (Note: Appearances in Eredivisie promotion/relegation playoffs)	0	11	0
TOP Oss	2019–20	Eerste Divisie	12	0	3	0	—		15	0
TOP Oss	2020–21	Eerste Divisie	0	0	0	0	—		0	0
TOP Oss	Total		37	0	5	0	2	0	44	0
Telstar	2021–22	Eerste Divisie	16	0	1	0	—		17	0
Telstar	2022–23	Eerste Divisie	33	0	2	0	—		35	0
Telstar	2023–24	Eerste Divisie	25	0	0	0	—		25	0
Telstar	2024–25	Eerste Divisie	38	0	2	0	6	0	46	0
Telstar	2025–26	Eredivisie	33	1	4	0	—		37	1
Telstar	2026–27	Eredivisie	5	2	0	0	—		5	2
Telstar	Total		150	3	9	0	6	0	165	3
Career total			187	3	14	0	8	0	209	3

== See also ==
- List of goalscoring goalkeepers
