= Tim van de Loo =

Dutch footballer (born 2003)

Personal information
- Date of birth: 22 February 2003 (age 23)
- Place of birth: Nieuw-Vennep, Netherlands
- Height: 1.71 m (5 ft 7 in)
- Position: Defensive midfielder

Team information
- Current team: RKC Waalwijk
- Number: 22

Youth career
- 2019–2021: Alphense Boys
- 2021–2023: Telstar

Senior career*
Years	Team	Apps	(Gls)
2023–2024	Telstar	35	(1)
2024–	RKC Waalwijk	27	(2)
- * Club domestic league appearances and goals as of 11 June 2025

Tim van de Loo (born 22 February 2003) is a Dutch professional footballer who plays as a midfielder for Eerste Divisie club RKC Waalwijk.

== Career ==
=== Telstar ===
Van de Loo was born on 22 March 2003 in Nieuw-Vennep, North Holland, and played youth football for Alphense Boys. During his time in the under-18s, he was coached by former professional footballer Julian Jenner.

In 2021, Van de Loo joined Telstar's youth academy. On 14 August 2023, he made his professional debut, replacing Zakaria Eddahchouri in the 76th minute of a 1–0 loss to Jong PSV in the Eerste Divisie. Van de Loo quickly became a regular starter in head coach Mike Snoei's squad. His first assist came on 29 September, contributing to a 3–2 win against Jong Ajax by setting up Danzell Gravenberch's goal for a 2–1 lead. Later, on 28 November 2023, he inked his inaugural professional contract with Telstar, committing to the club until 2026. Van de Loo then scored his first professional goal on 26 February 2024, contributing to a 3–0 away victory against Jong Ajax.

=== RKC Waalwijk ===
On 17 June 2024, Eredivisie club RKC Waalwijk announced that Van de Loo had signed a four-year contract with the club. Following the announcement, he expressed his content with the move, stating, "I see a lot of room for my personal and professional development, and I have a lot of confidence that I can realise my potential at RKC Waalwijk."

Van de Loo made his competitive debut for the club on 30 August 2024, replacing Reuven Niemeijer in the 74th minute of a 3–0 home loss to AZ. On 29 September, he made his first start for RKC, playing in attacking midfield in a 2–0 home loss to Ajax. He scored his first goal for the club on 26 January 2025, contributing to a 2–0 home victory over Willem II. Van de Loo finished the season with two goals in 29 appearances across all competitions, as RKC were relegated to the Eerste Divisie. In the club's final league match of the campaign—a 5–3 win over Go Ahead Eagles in which he scored—he sustained a serious knee injury that ruled him out for an extended period.

== Career statistics ==
As of match played 18 May 2025

Appearances and goals by club, season and competition
Club	Season	League			KNVB Cup		Other		Total	
Club	Season	Division	Apps	Goals	Apps	Goals	Apps	Goals	Apps	Goals
Telstar	2023–24	Eerste Divisie	35	1	1	0	—		36	1
RKC Waalwijk	2024–25	Eredivisie	27	1	2	0	—		29	1
RKC Waalwijk	2025–26	Eerste Divisie	0	0	0	0	—		0	0
RKC Waalwijk	Total		27	1	2	0	—		29	1
Career total			62	2	3	0	0	0	65	2
