= Delvechio Blackson =

Surinamese footballer (born 1995)

Personal information
- Full name: Delvechio Emile Blackson
- Date of birth: 26 February 1995 (age 31)
- Place of birth: Zaanstad, Netherlands
- Height: 1.86 m (6 ft 1 in)
- Positions: Left-back; centre-back

Youth career
- SC Buitenboys
- 2012–2015: PEC Zwolle
- 2015–2016: Cambuur

Senior career*
Years	Team	Apps	(Gls)
2016–2017	Cambuur	10	(0)
2017–2018	Jong Almere City	15	(0)
2017–2021	Almere City	56	(2)
2021–2023	Telstar	50	(0)
2023–2024	Egaleo	16	(0)
Total		147	(2)
- * Club domestic league appearances and goals

Delvechio Emile Blackson (born 26 February 1995) is a Surinamese former professional footballer who plays as a left-back or a centre-back.

== Club career ==
=== Cambuur ===
Born in Zaanstad, North Holland, and growing up in Paramaribo, Suriname, and later Almere, Flevoland, Blackson played youth football for SC Buitenboys and PEC Zwolle before joining the youth setup of Cambuur in 2015. He played for their under-21 team for one season, before being promoted to the first team ahead of the 2016–17 season, signing a one-year contract with the club in July 2016, with an option for an additional season.

Blackson made his first-team debut on 9 September 2016, featuring for 90 minutes at left-back in a 4–1 Eerste Divisie win over Almere City.

=== Almere City ===
On 11 May 2017, Blackson joined Eerste Divisie club Almere City as a free agent. Commenting on the transfer, Blackson stated that it was a "boyhood dream" to play for the club, partly growing up in the town: "When I visited Yanmar Stadion with Cambuur in February, I even told Calvin Mac-Intosch about it. Now it's happening." He signed a two-year contract.

He made his debut for the club on 1 September 2017, replacing Kees van Buuren in the 74th minute of a 2–1 league loss against Fortuna Sittard.

In March 2019, he extended his contract with Almere City until 2020, with an option for an additional season. In December 2019, Almere City exercised this option, keeping him at the club until 2021.

Blackson scored his first professional goal on 25 September 2020 in a 2–0 league victory against Helmond Sport, capitalising on a follow-up after Helmond's goalkeeper Stijn van Gassel had just saved a shot from Tim Receveur. He scored again two months later, on 15 November, a failed cross from 30 metres out which fooled Cambuur's goalkeeper Sonny Stevens in the ninth minute to equalise. Almere City went on to lose in humiliating fashion against Blackson's former side: 7–2.

=== Telstar ===
On 25 June 2021, Blackson signed with SC Telstar, after having played for Almere for four seasons. He made his debut for the club on 6 August, the opening matchday of the season, playing the full 90 minutes of a 1–1 home draw against Emmen. On 14 December 2021, he scored his first goal for Telstar in a 5–3 win after extra time in the KNVB Cup second round against Spakenburg.

=== Egaleo ===
On 21 September 2023, Blackson signed with Greek Super League 2 club Egaleo. He made his debut for the club on 28 October, coming on as a substitute during the second half of a 1–1 league draw against Athens Kallithea.

== International career ==
Born in the Netherlands, Blackson is of Surinamese descent. In March 2023, he was called up for the Suriname national team by coach Aron Winter for the CONCACAF Nations League game against Mexico on 23 March 2023. He did not make an appearance during the game which Suriname lost 2–0.

== Style of play ==
Blackson is a fast and athletic, left-footed defender, capable of playing the ball out from the back.

== Career statistics ==
As of match played 11 February 2024

Appearances and goals by club, season and competition
Club	Season	League			National cup		Other		Total	
Club	Season	Division	Apps	Goals	Apps	Goals	Apps	Goals	Apps	Goals
SC Cambuur	2016–17	Eerste Divisie	10	0	4	0	1 (Note: Appearances in Eredivisie promotion/relegation playoffs)	0	15	0
Jong Almere City	2017–18	Derde Divisie	15	0	—		—		15	0
Almere City	2017–18	Eerste Divisie	4	0	0	0	0	0	4	0
Almere City	2018–19	Eerste Divisie	21	0	1	0	0	0	22	0
Almere City	2019–20	Eerste Divisie	18	0	1	0	—		19	0
Almere City	2020–21	Eerste Divisie	13	2	0	0	0	0	13	2
Almere City	Total		56	2	2	0	0	0	58	2
Telstar	2021–22	Eerste Divisie	25	0	2	1	—		27	1
Telstar	2022–23	Eerste Divisie	25	0	2	0	—		27	0
Telstar	Total		50	0	4	1	—		54	1
Egaleo	2023–24	Super League 2	13	0	1	0	—		14	0
Career total			144	2	11	1	1	0	156	3
