= Mihkel Ainsalu =

Estonian footballer (born 1996)

- Ainsalu with Lviv in 2020

Personal information
- Date of birth: 8 March 1996 (age 30)
- Place of birth: Tartu, Estonia
- Height: 1.89 m (6 ft 2 1/2 in)
- Position: Midfielder

Team information
- Current team: Levadia
- Number: 11

Youth career
- 2006–2007: Oper academy
- 2008–2012: Nõmme Kalju

Senior career*
Years	Team	Apps	(Gls)
2012–2014	Nõmme Kalju II	56	(12)
2013–2014	Nõmme Kalju	13	(0)
2014–2020	Flora	126	(19)
2020	Lviv	11	(0)
2021	Helsingør	6	(0)
2021–2022	Legion	13	(3)
2022	Levadia	5	(0)
2022–2023	Telstar	12	(1)
2023–	Levadia	138	(34)

International career^{‡}
2011	Estonia U16	1	(0)
2013	Estonia U17	1	(1)
2014	Estonia U19	13	(0)
2014–2018	Estonia U21	27	(0)
2016	Estonia U23	1	(0)
2017–	Estonia	26	(0)
- * Club domestic league appearances and goals as of 17 November 2026 ‡ National team caps and goals as of 3 October 2026

Mihkel Ainsalu (born 8 March 1996) is an Estonian professional footballer who plays as a midfielder for Meistriliiga club Levadia.

== Club career ==
On 24 January 2023, Ainsalu's contract with Telstar was terminated by mutual consent, and he rejoined Levadia.

== International career ==
Ainsalu made his senior international debut for Estonia on 23 November 2017 in a 1–0 away win over Vanuatu in a friendly.

== Honours ==
Nõmme Kalju II

- Esiliiga B: 2013

Flora

- Meistriliiga: 2015, 2017, 2019
- Estonian Cup: 2015–16
- Estonian Supercup: 2016

Individual

- Meistriliiga Midfielder of the Season: 2024
