= DJ Buffonge =

English footballer (born 1998)

Personal information
- Full name: Darren Raekwon McIntosh-Buffonge
- Date of birth: 7 November 1998 (age 28)
- Place of birth: London, England
- Height: 1.78 m (5 ft 10 in)
- Position: Central midfielder

Youth career
- Arsenal
- 2010–2015: Fulham
- 2015–2019: Manchester United

Senior career*
Years	Team	Apps	(Gls)
2019–2020	Spezia	3	(0)
2020	→ Pergolettese (loan)	1	(0)
2020–2022	NAC Breda	17	(1)
2023	Telstar	4	(0)
2024	Emmen	1	(0)
- * Club domestic league appearances and goals as of 10 May 2024

Darren Raekwon McIntosh-Buffonge (born 7 November 1998) is a former English professional footballer who played as a central midfielder.

== Club career ==
=== Manchester United ===
Buffonge started in the youth system of Arsenal, prior to making the move across his hometown to Fulham in 2010. After five years with Fulham, Buffonge was signed by Manchester United's academy on trial ahead of the 2015–16 campaign. After impressing the likes of Ryan Giggs, Nicky Butt and Paul Mcguinnes, the central midfielder penned his scholarship and professional terms on 13 November 2015; despite missing several months with a groin injury. He left United on 30 June 2019 having not featured at first-team level, though did train with the senior squad on many occasions under Louis Van Gaal, Jose Mourinho and briefly Ole Gunnar Solskjaer . In the months leading up to his departure, Buffonge had trials with EFL Championship duo Derby County and Bolton Wanderers.

=== Spezia ===
On 9 August 2019, Buffonge moved abroad to join Italian Serie B side Spezia; penning a one-year contract, with the option of a further year. He made his professional debut on 18 August in the Coppa Italia, replacing Delano Burgzorg after sixty-two minutes of a defeat to Sassuolo of Serie A. His first Serie B appearance arrived a week later against Cittadella.

==== Loan to Pergolettese ====
On 31 January 2020, he was loaned to Serie C club Pergolettese. He made one league appearance, against Lecco on 9 February, before COVID-19 pandemic stopped that loan spell prematurely.

=== NAC Breda ===
On 14 August 2020, Buffonge joined Dutch Eerste Divisie side NAC Breda. His debut arrived on 29 August against Jong AZ, having replaced Moreno Rutten after eighty-five minutes of a 6–1 victory. He scored his first senior goal whilst with the club, netting in a 4–1 win away to MVV Maastricht on 6 November.

His contract was not extended after the 2021–22 season, making him a free agent.

=== Telstar ===
In January 2023, Buffonge joined Eerste Divisie side Telstar.

=== Emmen ===
On 25 January 2024, Buffonge joined Emmen on an amateur basis.

== International career ==
Buffonge is eligible for England, Montserrat, Antigua & Barbuda, and Trinidad & Tobago. In February 2017, Buffonge was selected by Antigua and Barbuda for the CONCACAF U-20 Championship in Costa Rica. However, Buffonge didn't appear at the tournament after being replaced by Ajani Thomas. He was later called up to represent Montserrat for their 2026 World Cup Qualifying campaign, before pulling out of the squad due to an injury sustained in a friendly against Miami United.

== Personal life ==
Buffonge's brother, Dajour, is also a footballer who played internationally for Montserrat.

== Career statistics ==
As of 26 February 2021.

Appearances and goals by club, season and competition
Club	Season	League			National cup		League cup		Continental		Other		Total	
Club	Season	Division	Apps	Goals	Apps	Goals	Apps	Goals	Apps	Goals	Apps	Goals	Apps	Goals
Spezia	2019–20	Serie B	3	0	1	0	—		—		0	0	4	0
Pergolettese (loan)	2019–20	Serie C	1	0	0	0	—		—		0	0	1	0
NAC Breda	2020–21	Eerste Divisie	10	1	1	0	—		—		0	0	11	1
Career total			14	1	2	0	—		—		0	0	16	1
