= Anwar Bensabouh =

Footballer (born 1999)

Personal information
- Date of birth: 21 January 1999 (age 27)
- Place of birth: Amsterdam, Netherlands
- Height: 1.79 m (5 ft 10 in)
- Position: Midfielder

Team information
- Current team: AFC
- Number: 18

Youth career
- 2010–2017: AFC
- 2017–2018: Almere City

Senior career*
Years	Team	Apps	(Gls)
2018–2021	Jong Almere City	31	(6)
2018–2021	Almere City	56	(1)
2021–2023	Telstar	52	(5)
2024–2026	Quick Boys	30	(3)
2026–	AFC	6	(2)
- * Club domestic league appearances and goals as of 19:06, 24 October 2026 (UTC)

Anwar Bensabouh (Arabic: أنور بنصبوح; Berber languages: ⴰⵏⵡⴰⵔ ⴱⵏⵙⴰⴱⵓⵃ; born 21 January 1999) is a professional footballer who plays as a midfielder for Tweede Divisie club AFC. Born in the Netherlands, he is of Moroccan descent. (Note: Anwar Bensabouh at WorldFootball.net)

== Career ==
=== Almere City ===
Bensabouh played youth football for AFC and Almere City. He made his debut for their reserve team, Jong Almere City, on 31 March 2018, starting in a 1–0 loss in the Derde Divisie against Jong FC Volendam. On 5 May 2018, he scored his first senior goal, opening the score in a 2–0 home victory against Magreb '90. He contributed to the team's promotion to the Tweede Divisie at the end of the season, after a two-legged play-off win over JVC Cuijk.

Ahead of the 2018–19 season, Bensabouh was promoted to the first team, signing his first professional contract with the club in August 2018. He made his professional debut for Almere City in the Eerste Divisie on 20 August 2018 in a game against Jong AZ, replacing Anass Ahannach in the 86th minute. On 12 April 2019, he scored his first goal in a 3–1 league win over FC Den Bosch. Almere City qualified for promotion play-offs to the Eredivisie that season, which saw Bensabouh score his second goal for the club in the first round against Cambuur. They would however be knocked out by Cambuur after a loss in the second leg.

On 11 June 2019, Bensabouh signed a contract extension, keeping him at Almere City until 2022.

=== Telstar ===
On 30 June 2021, Bensabouh signed a two-year contract with league rivals Telstar. He made his debut for the club on the first matchday of the season, playing 90 minutes in a 1–1 home draw against Emmen. On 22 October, he scored his first goal for Telstar in an Eerste Divisie draw against Helmond Sport.

He suffered a knee injury on 26 October 2021 in a KNVB Cup match against Kozakken Boys, which sidelined him for several months. On his comeback on 4 March 2022, he scored an important goal from distance to secure a 2–2 draw against TOP Oss. He scored four goals in 24 appearances in his first season at the club, which saw them finish in a disappointing 19th place in the league table.

Under new head coach Mike Snoei, Bensabouh grew into a key player in midfield for Telstar early in the 2022–23 season. In September 2022, he suffered a knee injury which sidelined him for several weeks. In the second half of the season, Bensabouh appeared as captain in Glynor Plet's absence. On 28 April 2023, he scored the decisive goal of a 1–0 victory against Den Bosch, keeping Telstar in the race for a spot in the promotion play-offs. The team eventually finished in ninth place, improving drastically on their performance from the previous season, albeit missing out on play-offs by five points. Bensabouh scored once in 30 appearances that season.

=== Quick Boys ===
On 14 October 2024, Bensabouh signed for Tweede Divisie club Quick Boys after several weeks of training with the squad. He agreed a one-year contract with an option for a second season. He had spent more than a year without a club, during which proposed moves to Qatar and to Eerste Divisie side FC Den Bosch fell through. He said he had chosen Quick Boys because the club played for prizes.

Bensabouh made his debut on 30 October 2024 against his former club Almere City in the first round of the KNVB Cup. He came on in the 67th minute as Quick Boys beat the Eredivisie side 3–0. Three days later, he made his league debut as a half-time substitute in a 5–0 away win over Noordwijk. His first months focused on regaining his fitness, and he became a regular in midfield after the winter break. On 15 March 2025, he scored his first goal for the club and set up another in a 4–1 derby win over Katwijk. On 14 April 2025, he extended his contract until the summer of 2026, with a club option for a further year. Quick Boys went on to win the 2024–25 Tweede Divisie title.

A meniscus operation kept Bensabouh out for much of the first half of the 2025–26 season. He returned to the side after the winter break. In April 2026, he and the club agreed that he would leave at the end of the season. Quick Boys retained the Tweede Divisie title that season.

=== AFC ===
In the summer of 2026, Bensabouh returned to AFC, where he had played youth football from 2010 to 2017. He was one of ten new players in the squad for the 2026–27 season. In October 2026, he scored AFC's only goal in a 4–1 defeat away to Barendrecht.

== Personal life ==
Born in the Netherlands, Bensabouh is of Moroccan descent.

== Career statistics ==
As of match played 24 May 2025

Appearances and goals by club, season and competition
Club	Season	League			KNVB Cup		Other		Total	
Club	Season	Division	Apps	Goals	Apps	Goals	Apps	Goals	Apps	Goals
Jong Almere City	2017–18	Derde Divisie	8	1	—		3 (Note: Appearances in Derde Divisie promotion playoffs)	0	11	1
Jong Almere City	2018–19	Tweede Divisie	20	5	—		—		20	5
Jong Almere City	2019–20	Derde Divisie	3	0	—		—		3	0
Jong Almere City	Total		31	6	—		3	0	34	6
Almere City	2018–19	Eerste Divisie	18	1	0	0	2 (Note: Appearances in Eredivisie promotion/relegation playoffs)	1	20	2
Almere City	2019–20	Eerste Divisie	25	0	0	0	—		25	0
Almere City	2020–21	Eerste Divisie	13	0	1	0	0	0	14	0
Almere City	Total		56	1	1	0	2	1	59	2
Telstar	2021–22	Eerste Divisie	23	4	1	0	—		24	4
Telstar	2022–23	Eerste Divisie	29	1	1	0	—		30	1
Telstar	Total		52	5	2	0	—		54	5
Quick Boys	2024–25	Tweede Divisie	18	2	3	0	—		21	2
Career total			157	14	6	0	5	1	168	15

== Honours ==
Quick Boys

- Tweede Divisie: 2024–25, 2025–26
