= Koen Blommestijn =

Dutch footballer (born 1999)

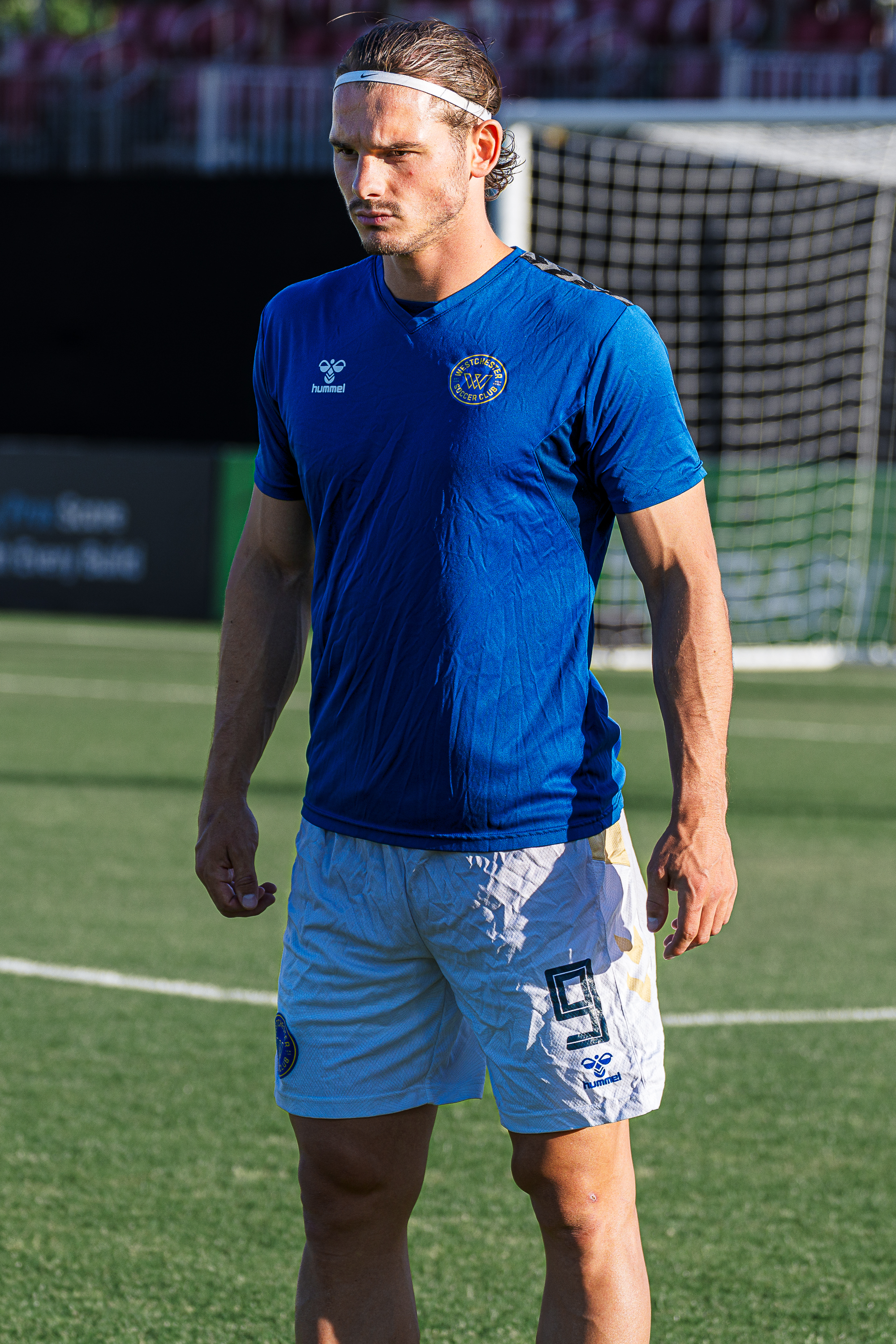
- Blommestijn playing for Westchester SC in 2026

Personal information
- Date of birth: October 14, 1999 (age 27)
- Height: 1.85 m (6 ft 1 in)
- Position: Forward

Team information
- Current team: Westchester SC
- Number: 9

Youth career
- Legmeervogels
- SV Argon
- ASC Waterwijk
- FC Almere

Senior career*
Years	Team	Apps	(Gls)
2019–2020	AFC Ajax (amateurs)	10	(5)
2020	FC Volendam II	2	(0)
2021–2024	FC Volendam	3	(1)
2021–2022	→ FC Volendam II	32	(22)
2022–2023	→ SC Telstar (loan)	13	(2)
2023–2024	→ Quick Boys (loan)	13	(7)
2025–	Westchester SC	28	(6)
- * Club domestic league appearances and goals as of 13:19, 24 October 2026 (UTC)

Koen Blommestijn (born 14 October 1999) is a Dutch professional footballer who plays as a forward for USL League One side Westchester SC.

== Career ==
=== Early career ===
Blommestijn played in numerous youth academies across the Netherlands, before playing for the AFC Ajax amateurs.

=== FC Volendam ===
Playing for in the Tweede Divisie for FC Volendam II, Blommestijn totaled 22 goals in 34 matches.

He made his professional debut with the senior team on 11 February 2022 for FC Volendam in a 2–1 win over Jong AZ.

==== Loan to Telstar ====
Ahead of the 2022–23 season, Blommestijn joined SC Telstar on loan. He scored 2 goals in 11 matches for Telstar.

==== Loan to Quick Boys ====
In February 2024, Blommestijn joined Tweede Divisie club Quick Boys on loan until the end of the season.

==== Return to Volendam and contract termination ====
Blommestijn returned to Volendam ahead of the 2024–25 season, but did not make an appearance. His contract was terminated on 23 December 2024.

=== Westchester SC ===
On 4 January 2025, Blommestijn signed for USL League One side Westchester SC in the United States ahead of their inaugural 2025 season.
