= 2025–26 SC Telstar season =

Dutch football club season

Telstar
2025–26 season
- Chairman: Lex de Jager
- Head coach: Anthony Correia
- Stadium: BUKO Stadion
- Eredivisie: 14th
- KNVB Cup: Semi-finals
- Top goalscorer: League: Patrick Brouwer; Jochem Ritmeester van de Kamp (7 each); All: Patrick Brouwer (9)
- Biggest win: 5–0 v. Lisse (A); KNVB Cup, 29 October 2025
- Biggest defeat: 1–4 v. PEC Zwolle (A); Eredivisie, 31 January 2026; 0–3 v. Heerenveen (A); Eredivisie, 14 March 2026; 1–4 v. Utrecht (A); Eredivisie, 11 April 2026
Home colours	Away colours

The 2025–26 season was the 63rd season in the history of SC Telstar since the club's establishment in 1963 and marked their return to the Eredivisie, the highest division of the Dutch football league system, for the first time since the 1977–78 season.

SC Telstar had spent 47 consecutive seasons in the Eerste Divisie following their relegation from the top flight in 1978, when they finished bottom of the league. Their return was secured through the promotion play-offs during the previous season, after finishing seventh in the Eerste Divisie. Telstar defeated ADO Den Haag in the first round and FC Den Bosch in the semi-finals before overcoming Willem II Tilburg in the final, securing promotion with a 3–1 victory in the second leg in Tilburg on 1 June 2025.

In their first Eredivisie campaign in 47 years, Telstar finished 14th in the league standings. The club also competed in the KNVB Cup, advancing to the semi-finals before being eliminated by AZ Alkmaar following a 2–1 defeat.

Patrick Brouwer ended the season as Telstar's leading goalscorer, registering nine goals across all competitions, with seven scored in the Eredivisie and two in the KNVB Cup. Jeff Hardeveld and Tyrese Noslin shared the distinction of making the most appearances for the club, each playing in 39 competitive fixtures, comprising 34 Eredivisie matches and five KNVB Cup appearances.

== Background and pre-season ==
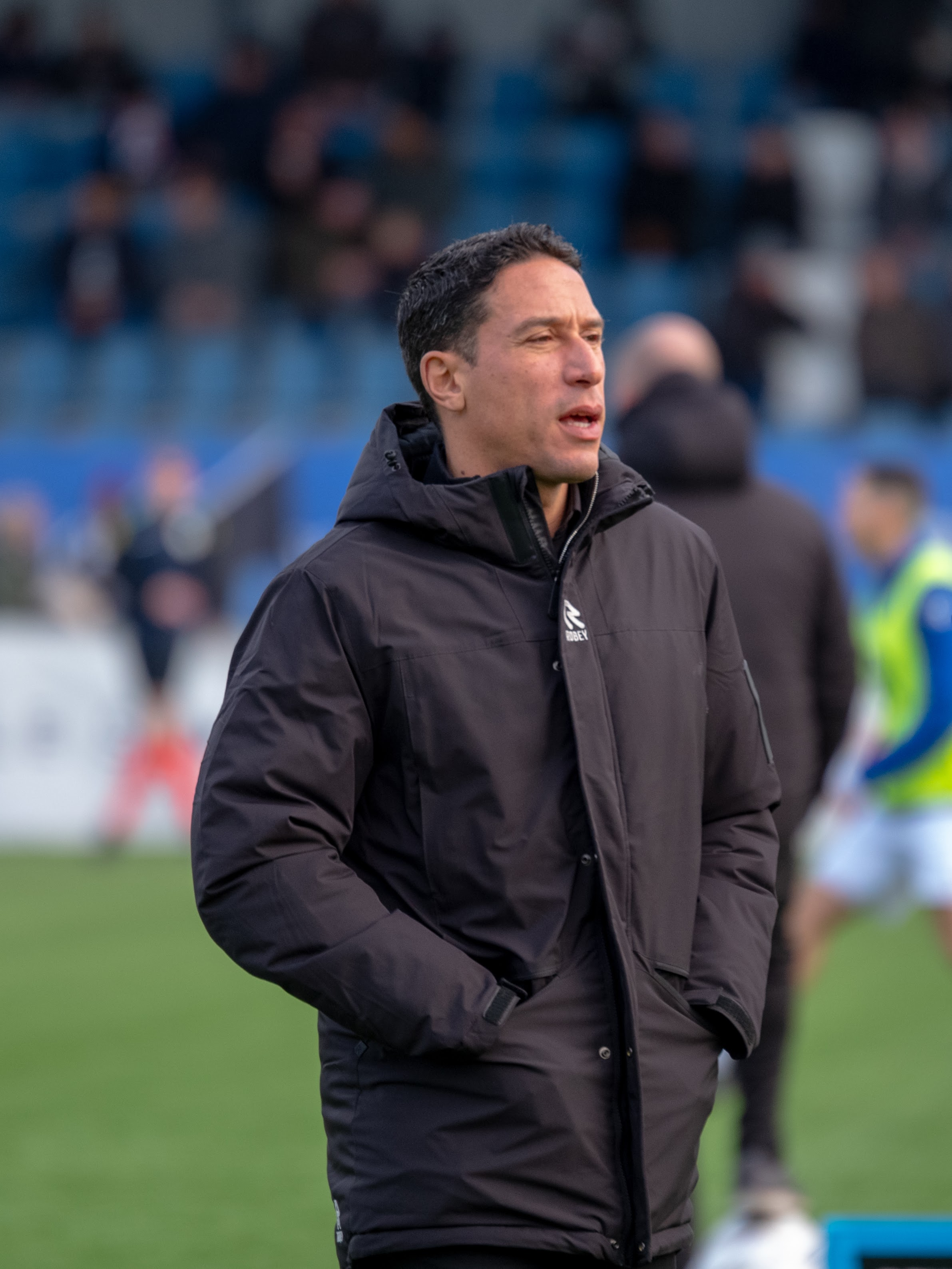
Telstar head coach Anthony Correia served the club for a second full season.

Anthony Correia, a former Telstar player, served as head coach for a second full season, having been appointed in April 2024. Telstar's first-choice kit consisted of all white shirts, shorts and socks. The club retained construction firm BUKO as primary sponsor under a new agreement that also gave naming rights to the Sportpark Schoonenberg, which was rebranded the BUKO Stadion. Significant work also took place at the ground, where the pitch was converted from artificial turf to natural grass in line with new Eredivisie regulations.

Squad building began early. In February, Telstar pre-contracted defender Nigel Ogidi Nwankwo from Quick Boys, followed in May by striker Milan Zonneveld from the same club and, in June, forward Patrick Brouwer. Neville Ogidi Nwankwo, brother of Nigel, arrived on loan from Utrecht on 3 July, and goalkeeper Daan Reiziger signed later that month after leaving Cambuur. Defender Dion Malone and midfielder Dylan Mertens both signed in early August, while on 18 August Almere City's Jochem Ritmeester van de Kamp joined on loan. The window concluded with the permanent signing of forward Kay Tejan from USL Dunkerque for a reported €230,000 on a two-year contract. The top goalscorer from the previous season, Youssef El Kachati, moved to fellow Eredivisie club NEC, and veterans Mitch Apau and Tom Overtoom ended their professional careers to join amateur sides Spakenburg and Rijnsburgse Boys respectively.

Telstar prepared with eight friendlies between July and early August. They opened with a 6–1 win at ADO '20 and drew 1–1 with Heerenveen in a 120-minute run-out, before victories over Rijnsburgse Boys (2–0) and Cambuur (2–0 in Stiens) and a 3–3 draw with Turkish side Samsunspor in Driel. On 26 July, the club won the one-day Visserijtoernooi at VV Katwijk with short-format victories over Koninklijke HFC (2–0) and Katwijk (1–0). A 5–0 reverse followed away to Jong Sparta. Pre-season closed with a 2–1 comeback win over Qatari side Al-Shamal in Maurik, in which Soufiane Hetli converted a penalty before Zonneveld struck the winner. Former Netherlands international Adam Maher trained with the club and featured in friendlies, but did not sign a contract.

== Eredivisie ==
=== August to December ===
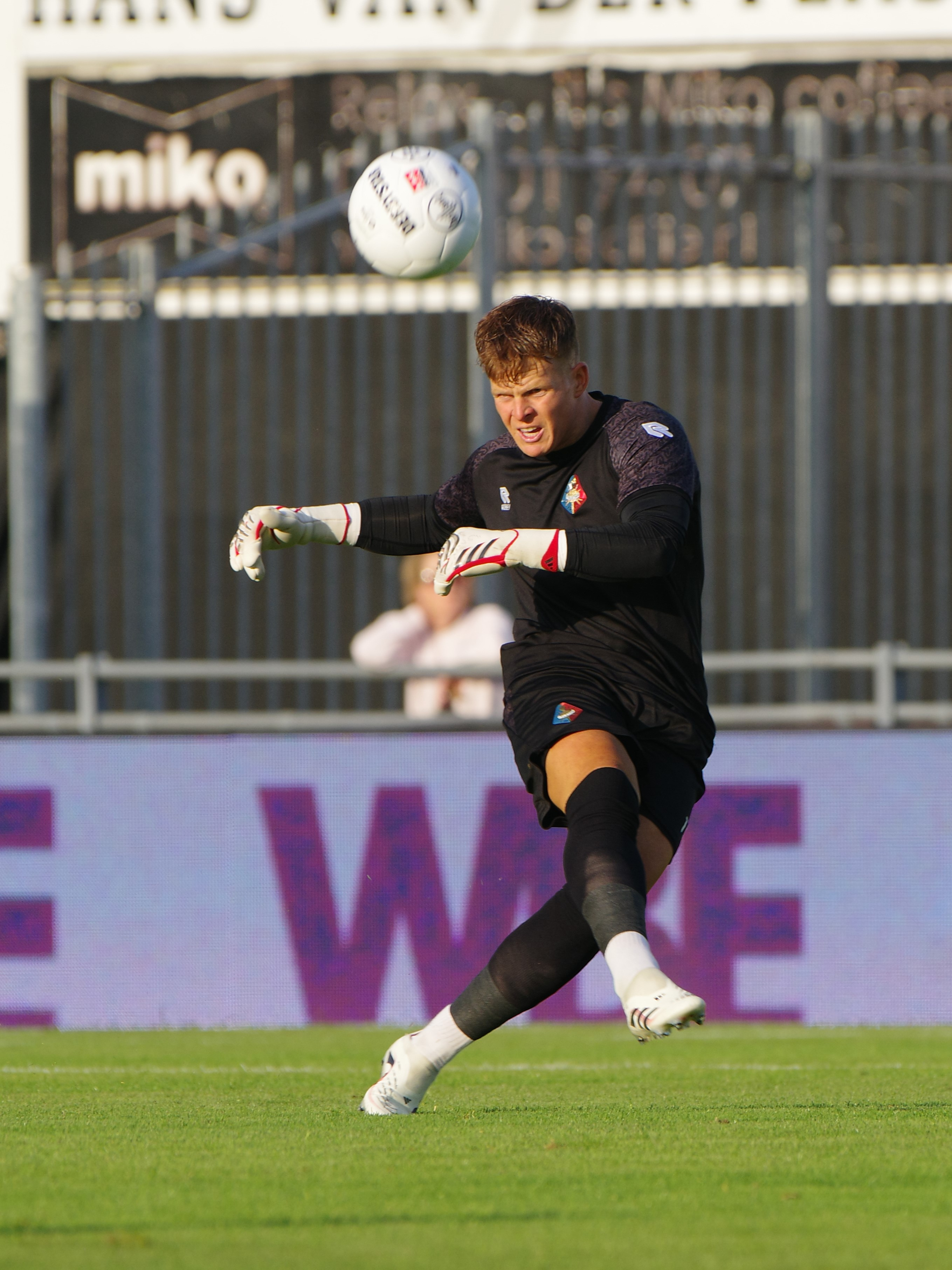
Goalkeeper Ronald Koeman Jr. kept several clean sheets and produced decisive saves throughout the season.

Telstar's first Eredivisie game of the season was away to Ajax on 10 August at the Johan Cruyff Arena, where the team lost 2–0. The first home fixture, against PEC Zwolle on 15 August at the renamed BUKO Stadion, was also lost 2–0, with Koen Kostons scoring both goals. The first point came on 23 August in a 2–2 home draw against fellow promotee Volendam, in which Hetli scored Telstar's first Eredivisie goal in 47 years before Brouwer doubled the lead. Anthony Descotte then scored twice late on for Volendam to deny Telstar a first top-flight victory since 1978. That victory arrived a week later, when goals from Tyrone Owusu and Brouwer, along with several saves by goalkeeper Ronald Koeman Jr., secured a 2–0 win away to defending champions PSV.

September and early October produced mixed results. Telstar lost 3–1 at home to Fortuna Sittard on 14 September after Makan Aïko scored a late substitute's brace, and 2–0 away to Groningen six days later. On 28 September, the team beat reigning cup holders Go Ahead Eagles 4–2 at home in their first home win of the season, with goals from Tejan, Nils Rossen, Ritmeester van de Kamp and Hetli, and Tyrese Noslin heading a shot off the line late on to preserve the lead. The result meant Telstar had beaten both the reigning champions and the domestic cup holders within their first two months back in the Eredivisie. On 5 October, before the international break, Telstar lost 2–1 away to AZ in a North Holland derby in which Mexx Meerdink opened the scoring from the penalty spot after Neville Ogidi Nwankwo had fouled Matěj Šín in the box; Noslin pulled one back midway through the second half.

After the international break, Telstar remained competitive but struggled to convert performances into points. A 3–2 home defeat to Heerenveen on 19 October was followed by a 1–0 loss at Sparta on 25 October, leaving the team near the bottom of the table. A run of draws then helped steady the campaign. Telstar drew 2–2 with Excelsior on 1 November, a match marked by an extensive tribute inside the BUKO Stadion to a recently deceased local supporter, with head coach Correia describing the impact on the club and wider IJmond region. A 0–0 draw at Twente on 7 November in Enschede was the clubs' first meeting in 47 years. On 23 November, Telstar drew 1–1 at home with Utrecht with Hetli scoring before Can Bozdoğan equalised in the third minute of stoppage time. At De Kuip on 30 November, the team drew 1–1 with Feyenoord, a late equaliser from Tejan cancelling out an own goal by Guus Offerhaus.

In December, Telstar drew 1–1 at Heracles on 6 December, Zonneveld scoring in front of 12,046 spectators at the Erve Asito before Ivan Mesik equalised in stoppage time. They drew at home with NEC the following weekend. Telstar ended 2025 with a key 1–0 away win at relegation rivals NAC Breda, a result highlighted in regional press as a boost heading into the winter break, and one that lifted them to 15th place at the halfway point of the season.

=== January to May ===
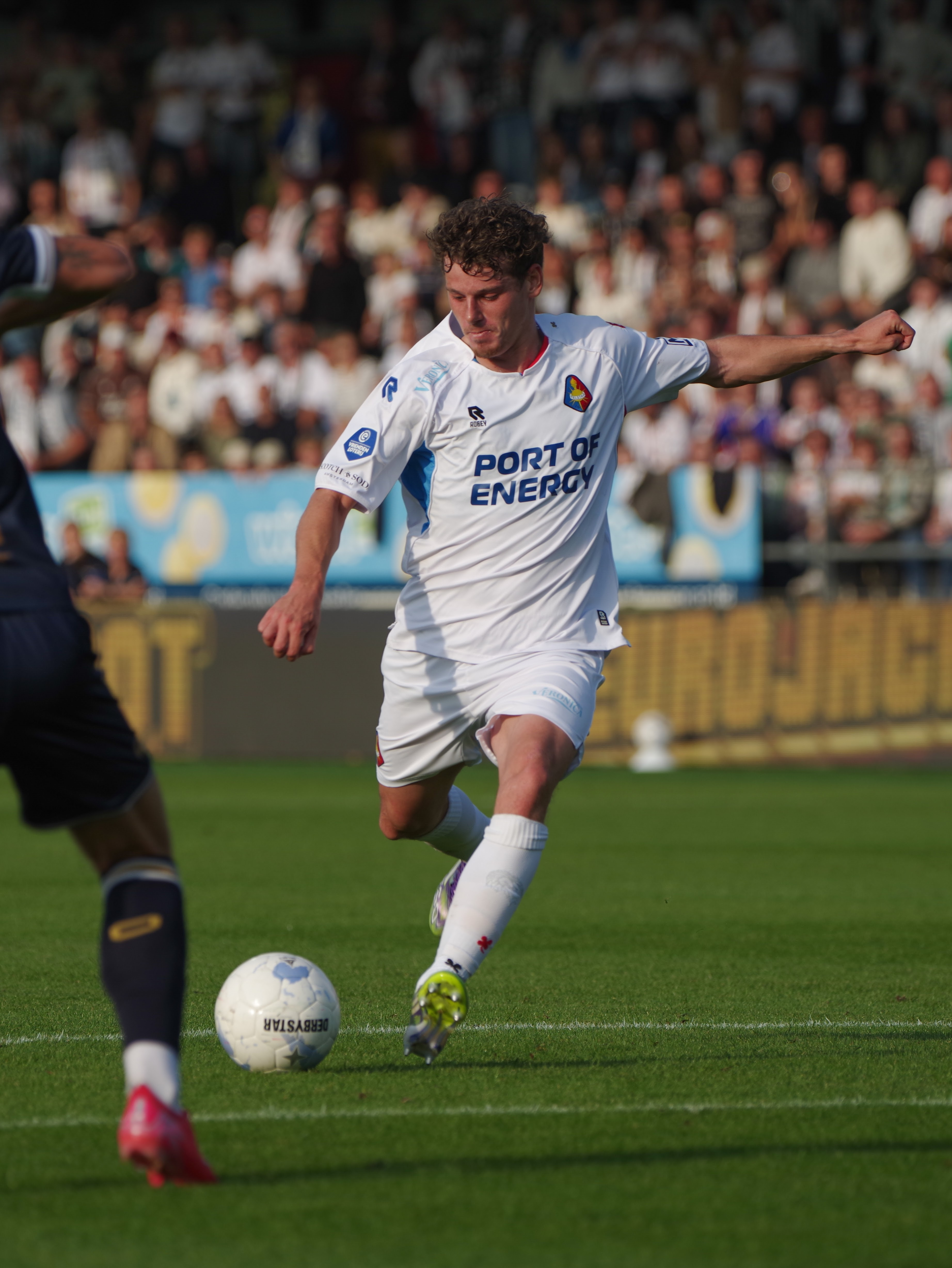
Forward Patrick Brouwer joined from amateur club Quick Boys and was Telstar's season top scorer.

Telstar opened the new year with a 3–2 home defeat to Ajax on 11 January after falling 3–0 behind. The closing stages, played after a red card for winter loan signing Cedric Hatenboer, nearly produced a comeback that left Ajax head coach Fred Grim openly critical of his side's game management afterwards. Results remained tight through late January. Telstar lost 1–0 at home to AZ on 25 January in a game described by regional broadcaster NH as one in which the hosts had not rewarded themselves despite sustained pressure. On 8 February, a stoppage-time equaliser earned a 1–1 draw away at Go Ahead Eagles. The 1–1 home draw with Twente the following week was Telstar's ninth of the season. A 2–1 defeat away to Feyenoord on 22 February, which saw the debut of England international Raheem Sterling for their opponents, was followed on 27 February by a 3–0 home win over NAC Breda, which lifted the team further from the relegation places.

On 8 March, Telstar won 4–1 away at Fortuna Sittard for their largest away win of the season. A 3–0 defeat at Heerenveen followed six days later. On 22 March, Telstar produced one of the season's defining results, beating champions PSV 3–1 at home and so defeating the same side both at home and away in the same Eredivisie season. PSV had been reduced to ten men in the first half after a red card for Anass Salah-Eddine. Brouwer opened the scoring, Kiliann Sildillia briefly equalised with a header, and Van Duijn and Tejan added further goals.

April brought further mixed fortunes. Telstar lost 2–0 at home to Groningen on 4 April, with Dies Janse and Jorg Schreuders scoring for the visitors, and 4–1 at Utrecht a week later. Telstar recovered on 22 April with a 4–1 home win over Sparta Rotterdam, with goals from Zonneveld, Jeff Hardeveld, Van Duijn (two) and substitute Jelani Seedorf. In early May, Van Duijn also scored in a 1–1 draw away at NEC.

With three matches remaining, Telstar still needed points to confirm Eredivisie survival. On 10 May, the team won 3–0 at home against the already-relegated Heracles in the penultimate round, eliminating the possibility of direct relegation but leaving the play-off place still in play. The decisive match came on 17 May at Kras Stadion, where Telstar faced fellow strugglers Volendam in the final round of the season. A draw was enough to secure Telstar's Eredivisie place. With the score level at 1–1 and the closing stages approaching, Telstar were awarded a penalty in the 89th minute, which was converted by Koeman Jr. for a 2–1 win. Koeman became the first goalkeeper to score from the penalty spot in an Eredivisie match since Wim de Ron for Cambuur in 1999. The result confirmed Telstar's 14th-place finish on 37 points and sent Volendam into the relegation play-off.

On 18 May, the day after the survival match, Telstar announced that Heerenveen assistant coach Henk Brugge would succeed Correia as head coach for the 2026–27 season. Correia was to take over as head coach of Utrecht.

== KNVB Cup ==
Telstar's run in the 2025–26 KNVB Cup was their longest in the competition since the 1991–92 season. The team entered the competition on 29 October 2025 with a 5–0 away win at amateur side Lisse at Sportpark Ter Specke. Wins in December and over Almere City in January brought the team to a quarter-final tie at home to cup holders Go Ahead Eagles on 5 February 2026, which Telstar won 2–1 to reach the semi-finals for the first time in 34 years. The run ended on 4 March in Alkmaar with a 2–1 defeat to AZ, who went on to win the final against NEC.

== First-team squad ==
As of 3 February 2026

No.	Player	Position	Nationality	Date of birth (age)	Signed from	Date signed	Fee	Contract end
Goalkeepers
1	Ronald Koeman Jr.	GK	(Netherlands)	23 May 1995 (aged 31)	TOP Oss	1 July 2021	Free transfer	2026
13	Tyrick Bodak	GK	(Curaçao)	15 May 2002 (aged 24)	Cambuur	1 July 2024	Free transfer	2026
20	Daan Reiziger	GK	(Netherlands)	18 June 2001 (aged 25)	Cambuur	15 July 2025	Free transfer	2027
Defenders
2	Jeff Hardeveld	LB / CB	(Netherlands)	27 February 1995 (aged 31)	Emmen	2 September 2024	Free transfer	2027
3	Gerald Alders	RB / CB	(Netherlands)	7 May 2005 (aged 21)	Jong Ajax	3 February 2026	Loan	2026
4	Guus Offerhaus	CB / DM	(Netherlands)	3 January 2001 (aged 25)	Quick Boys	1 July 2024	Free transfer	2026
5	Nigel Ogidi Nwankwo	LB / CB	(Netherlands)	4 August 1998 (aged 27)	Quick Boys	1 July 2025	Free transfer	2027
6	Danny Bakker (C)	CB / DM	(Netherlands)	16 January 1995 (aged 31)	NAC Breda	31 August 2023	Free transfer	2026
11	Tyrese Noslin	RB / LB	(Curaçao)	11 September 2002 (aged 23)	Jong Almere City	8 August 2024	Free transfer	2027
14	Neville Ogidi Nwankwo	CB / RB	(Netherlands)	8 October 2002 (aged 23)	Utrecht	4 July 2025	Loan	2026
15	Adil Lechkar	LB / LM	(Netherlands)	2 September 2001 (aged 24)	TEC	1 July 2024	Free transfer	Amateur
21	Devon Koswal	CB	(Suriname)	21 August 2003 (aged 22)	Dordrecht	15 August 2023	Free transfer	2026
24	Abdelrafie Benzzine	CB	(Netherlands)	4 April 2006 (aged 20)	Academy	1 July 2024	—N/a	Amateur
25	Yamano Olfers	CB	(Suriname)	2 August 2006 (aged 19)	Academy	1 July 2024	—N/a	Amateur
28	Rojendro Oudsten	CB / CM	(Suriname)	12 November 2007 (aged 18)	Academy	1 July 2025	—N/a	Amateur
29	Dion Malone	CB / RB	(Suriname)	13 February 1989 (aged 37)	(Cyprus) Karmiotissa	9 August 2025	Free transfer	Amateur
Midfielders
8	Tyrone Owusu	DM / RB	(Netherlands)	5 March 1999 (aged 27)	Quick Boys	1 July 2024	Free transfer	2027
16	Dylan Mertens	AM / CM	(Netherlands)	20 July 1995 (aged 30)	(Russia) Fakel Voronezh	8 August 2025	Free transfer	2026
17	Nils Rossen	CM / DM	(Netherlands)	1 August 2004 (aged 21)	NEC	8 August 2024	Free transfer	2026
23	Cedric Hatenboer	DM / CM	(Netherlands)	19 March 2005 (aged 21)	(Belgium) Anderlecht	5 January 2026	Loan	2026
23	Rayyan Koubini	CM	(Netherlands)	6 June 2005 (aged 21)	Academy	1 July 2025	—N/a	Amateur
39	Jochem Ritmeester van de Kamp	CM / RM / DM	(Netherlands)	2 November 2003 (aged 22)	Almere City	18 August 2025	Loan	2026
Forwards
7	Soufiane Hetli	ST / RW	(Netherlands)	30 May 2001 (aged 25)	AFC	1 July 2024	Free transfer	2027
9	Jelani Seedorf	ST	(Netherlands)	12 December 2004 (aged 21)	Jong Sparta	3 February 2026	Free transfer	2028
19	Nökkvi Þeyr Þórisson	ST	(Iceland)	13 August 1999 (aged 26)	Sparta Rotterdam	3 February 2026	Loan	2026
27	Patrick Brouwer	RW / AM	(Netherlands)	19 March 2001 (aged 25)	Quick Boys	1 July 2025	Free transfer	2028
30	Kay Tejan	ST / RW	(Netherlands)	3 February 1997 (aged 29)	(France) USL Dunkerque	29 August 2025	€230,000	2027
37	Sem van Duijn	ST	(Netherlands)	18 March 2004 (aged 22)	Jong AZ	26 January 2026	Loan	2026

== Transfers and contracts ==
=== Transfers in ===
Date	Pos.	No.	Player	From	Fee	Ref.
8 February 2025	DF	5	(Netherlands) Nigel Ogidi Nwankwo	Quick Boys	Free	
21 May 2025	ST	9	(Netherlands) Milan Zonneveld	Quick Boys	Free	
10 June 2025	ST	27	(Netherlands) Patrick Brouwer	Quick Boys	Free	
15 July 2025	GK	20	(Netherlands) Daan Reiziger	Cambuur	Free	
8 August 2025	DF	29	(Suriname) Dion Malone	(Cyprus) Karmiotissa	Free	
8 August 2025	MF	16	(Netherlands) Dylan Mertens	(Russia) Fakel Voronezh	Free	
29 August 2025	ST	30	(Netherlands) Kay Tejan	(France) USL Dunkerque	€230,000	
3 February 2026	ST	9	(Netherlands) Jelani Seedorf	Jong Sparta	Undisclosed	
Total					€230,000	

=== Loaned in ===
Date	Pos.	No.	Player	Loaned from	On loan until	Ref.
4 July 2025	DF	5	(Netherlands) Neville Ogidi Nwankwo	Utrecht	30 June 2026	
18 August 2025	MF	39	(Netherlands) Jochem Ritmeester van de Kamp	Almere City	30 June 2026	
5 January 2026	MF	23	(Netherlands) Cedric Hatenboer	Anderlecht	30 June 2026	
3 February 2026	DF	3	(Netherlands) Gerald Alders	Jong Ajax	30 June 2026	
3 February 2026	FW	19	(Iceland) Nökkvi Þeyr Þórisson	Sparta Rotterdam	30 June 2026	
3 February 2026	FW	37	(Netherlands) Sem van Duijn	Jong AZ	30 June 2026	

=== Transfers out ===
Date	Pos.	No.	Player	Subsequent club	Join date	Ref.
30 June 2025	DF	3	(Netherlands) Mitch Apau	Spakenburg	1 July 2025	
30 June 2025	MF	12	(Netherlands) Tom Overtoom	Rijnsburgse Boys	1 July 2025	
30 June 2025	ST	9	(Morocco) Youssef El Kachati	NEC	1 July 2025	
30 June 2025	MF	14	(Netherlands) Mees Kaandorp	(Egypt) Wadi Degla	8 August 2025	
30 June 2025	ST	27	(Netherlands) Reda Kharchouch	(Cyprus) PAC Omonia 29M	27 August 2025	
30 June 2025	MF	16	(Netherlands) Achraf Douiri	(Bahrain) Al-Najma	20 August 2025	
30 June 2025	GK	20	(Netherlands) Joey Houweling	Spakenburg	1 October 2025	
30 June 2025	MF	8	(Suriname) Jayden Turfkruier	(Finland) VPS	15 January 2026	
10 January 2026	MF	18	(Netherlands) Remi van Ekeris	Lisse	11 January 2026	
30 January 2026	ST	19	(Netherlands) Sebastiaan Hagedoorn	Jong Almere City	30 January 2026	
2 February 2026	DF	26	(Netherlands) Jaylan van Schooneveld	(Gibraltar) Glacis United	2 February 2026	
3 February 2026	FW	9	(Netherlands) Milan Zonneveld	Sparta Rotterdam	3 February 2026	
3 February 2026	FW	10	(Netherlands) Mohamed Hamdaoui	(Bahrain) Al-Riffa	11 February 2026	

=== Loaned out ===
Date	Pos.	No.	Player	Loaned to	On loan until	Ref.
2 September 2025	MF	18	(Netherlands) Remi van Ekeris	Lisse	11 January 2026	

== Pre-season and friendlies ==
On 28 June, Telstar announced their initial pre-season schedule, with matches against ADO '20, Heerenveen, Rijnsburgse Boys, Cambuur, Samsunspor, Jong Sparta Rotterdam, and Al-Shamal.

On 26 July, VV Katwijk hosted a one-day triangular pre-season tournament at Sportpark De Krom in Katwijk, marketed as the Visserstoernooi or Visserijtoernooi (Dutch: "Fishermen's Tournament"). The participants were Katwijk, Koninklijke HFC and Telstar. Each pairing played a 2 × 30-minute match (i.e. 60-minute games in total).

Win Draw Loss Fixtures

5 July 2025 Friendly	ADO '20	1–6	Telstar	Heemskerk
12:00 CEST	Calle Solbes 89'	Report	Hagedoorn 9'; Koswal 34'; Koubini 35'; Zonneveld 77' (pen.), 84'; Hardeveld 88'	Stadium: Sportpark De Vlotter

11 July 2025 Friendly	Heerenveen	1–1	Telstar	Niebert
19:00 CEST	Vente 37'	Report	Brouwer 39'	Stadium: Sportpark De Wieken
Note: Match played over two 60-minute halves (120 minutes total).

15 July 2025 Friendly	Rijnsburgse Boys	0–2	Telstar	Rijnsburg
20:00 CEST		Report	Koswal 24'; Hagedoorn 80'	Stadium: Sportpark Middelmors

19 July 2025 Friendly	Cambuur	0−2	Telstar	Stiens
17:00 CEST		Report	Hagedoorn 56', 78'	Stadium: Sportpark It Gryn
Note: The match was played in three periods of 45, 25 and 45 minutes.

22 July 2025 Friendly	Samsunspor	3–3	Telstar	Driel
17:00 CEST	Mouandilmadji 29'; Makoumbou 60'; Dimata 68'	Report	Tómasson 19' (o.g.); Mertens 57'; Nwankwo 77'	Stadium: Sportpark Driel

26 July 2025 Friendly	Telstar	2–0	Koninklijke HFC	Katwijk
13:30 CEST	Nwankwo 10'; Hagedoorn 36'	Report		Stadium: Sportpark De Krom
Note: Part of the Visserijtoernooi (Dutch: "Fishermen's Tournament"); 2 × 30-minute match.

26 July 2025 Friendly	Katwijk	0–1	Telstar	Katwijk
15:30 CEST		Report	Zonneveld 54'	Stadium: Sportpark De Krom
Note: Part of the Visserijtoernooi (Dutch: "Fishermen's Tournament"); 2 × 30-minute match.

29 July 2025 Friendly	Jong Sparta	5–0	Telstar	Rotterdam
13:00 CEST	Baas 11'; Þórisson 24', 40' (pen.), 43'; Jaber el Maftahi 67'	Report		Stadium: Sportcomplex Nieuw Terbregge

4 August 2025 Friendly	Al-Shamal	1–2	Telstar	Maurik
12:00 CEST	Unknown 39'	Report	Hetli 43' (pen.); Zonneveld 47'	Stadium: Sportpark MEC '07

== Competitions ==
=== Overall record ===
Competition	First match	Last match	Starting round	Final position	Record							
Competition	First match	Last match	Starting round	Final position	Pld	W	D	L	GF	GA	GD	Win %
Eredivisie	10 August 2025	17 May 2026	Matchday 1	14th	34	9	10	15	49	55	−6	26.47
KNVB Cup	29 October 2025	4 March 2026	First round	Semi-finals	5	4	0	1	15	5	+10	80.00
Total					39	13	10	16	64	60	+4	33.33

Source: WorldFootball

=== Eredivisie ===
==== League table ====
Pos	Team	Pld	W	D	L	GF	GA	GD	Pts	Qualification or relegation
12	Go Ahead Eagles	34	8	14	12	54	53	+1	38	
13	Excelsior	34	10	8	16	43	56	−13	38	
14	Telstar	34	9	10	15	49	55	−6	37	
15	PEC Zwolle	34	9	10	15	44	71	−27	37	
16	Volendam (R)	34	8	8	18	35	55	−20	32	Qualification for the Relegation play-off

Source: Eredivisie
Rules for classification: At end of season: 1) Points; 2) Goal difference; 3) Goals scored; 4) Head-to-head points; 5) Head-to-head goal difference; 6) Head-to-head goals scored; 7) Head-to-head away goals scored; 8) Play-off match or matches; 9) Penalty shoot-out (if the play-off match or matches end in a draw)
(R) Relegated

==== Results summary ====
Overall								Home						Away					
Pld	W	D	L	GF	GA	GD	Pts	W	D	L	GF	GA	GD	W	D	L	GF	GA	GD
34	9	10	15	49	55	−6	37	5	5	7	31	28	+3	4	5	8	18	27	−9

Source: WorldFootball

==== Results by round ====
Round	1	2	3	4	5	6	7	8	9	10	11	12	13	14	15	16	17	18	19	20	21	22	23	24	25	26	27	28	29	30	31	32	33	34
Ground	A	H	H	A	H	A	H	A	H	A	H	A	H	H	A	H	A	H	A	H	A	A	H	A	H	A	A	H	H	A	H	A	H	A
Result	L	L	D	W	L	L	W	L	L	L	D	D	D	L	D	D	W	L	D	L	L	D	D	L	W	W	L	W	L	L	W	D	W	W
Position	14	16	16	12	14	17	13	14	16	17	17	17	17	18	17	17	15	16	16	16	18	16	17	17	17	16	16	14	15	16	16	15	15	14
Points	0	0	1	4	4	4	7	7	7	7	8	9	10	10	11	12	15	15	16	16	16	17	18	18	21	24	24	27	27	27	30	31	34	37

Source: Eredivisie
A = Away; H = Home; W = Win; D = Draw; L = Loss; P = Postponed

==== Matches ====
The league fixtures were released on 24 June 2025.

Win Draw Loss Fixtures

10 August 2025 1	Ajax	2–0	Telstar	Amsterdam
14:30 CEST (UTC+2)	Weghorst 19', 83'	Report		Stadium: Johan Cruyff Arena; Attendance: 54,665; Referee: Jannick van der Laan

15 August 2025 2	Telstar	0–2	PEC Zwolle	Velsen-Zuid
20:00 CEST (UTC+2)	Offerhaus (yellow card) 25'; Hetli (yellow card) 31'; Noslin (yellow card) 67'	Report	Kostons 4', 58'; De Rooij (yellow card) 11'; Thomas (yellow card) 48'; Mbayo (yellow card) 66'	Stadium: BUKO Stadion; Attendance: 5,293; Referee: Serdar Gözübüyük

23 August 2025 3	Telstar	2–2	Volendam	Velsen-Zuid
21:00 CEST (UTC+2)	Hetli 41', (yellow card) 70'; Brouwer 45+1'; Noslin (yellow card) 52'; Zonneveld (yellow card) 82'	Report	Descotte 64', 82'	Stadium: BUKO Stadion; Attendance: 5,273; Referee: Sander van der Eijk

30 August 2025 4	PSV	0–2	Telstar	Eindhoven
20:00 CEST (UTC+2)	Flamingo (yellow card) 70'	Report	Owusu 21'; Brouwer 65'; Hardeveld (yellow card) 68'	Stadium: Philips Stadion; Attendance: 34,500; Referee: Robin Hensgens

14 September 2025 5	Telstar	1–3	Fortuna Sittard	Velsen-Zuid
16:45 CEST (UTC+2)	Ritmeester van de Kamp 43', (yellow card) 49'	Report	Gladon 2'; Aïko 64', 82'	Stadium: BUKO Stadion; Attendance: 5,293; Referee: Martijn Vos

20 September 2025 6	Groningen	2–0	Telstar	Groningen
18:45 CEST (UTC+2)	Taha 29'; Resink (yellow card) 47'; Zawada 88'	Report	Mertens (yellow card) 53'; Oudsten (yellow card) 64'	Stadium: Euroborg; Attendance: 22,525; Referee: Erwin Blank

28 September 2025 7	Telstar	4–2	Go Ahead Eagles	Velsen-Zuid
16:45 CEST (UTC+2)	Tejan 7'; Mertens (yellow card) 23'; Rossen 42'; Offerhaus (yellow card) 60'; Ritmeester van de Kamp 71'; Hetli 90+4'	Report	Meulensteen 45+1'; Smit 73'	Stadium: BUKO Stadion; Attendance: 5,250; Referee: Ingmar Oostrom

5 October 2025 8	AZ	2–1	Telstar	Alkmaar
16:45 CEST (UTC+2)	Meerdink 15' (pen.); Šín 45+2', (yellow card) 52'; Goes (yellow card) 64'; Kasius (yellow card) 73'	Report	Neville Ogidi Nwankwo (yellow card) 14'; Noslin 61'; Ritmeester van de Kamp (yellow card) 90'	Stadium: AFAS Stadion; Attendance: 18,849; Referee: Jannick van der Laan

19 October 2025 9	Telstar	2–3	Heerenveen	Velsen-Zuid
12:45 CEST (UTC+2)	Koswal (yellow card) 4'; Hardeveld 45'; Zonneveld 85'	Report	Trenskow 21'; Vente 42' (pen.); Willemsen (yellow card) 44'; Meerveld 54'; Linday (yellow card) 72'	Stadium: BUKO Stadion; Attendance: 5,293; Referee: Dennis Johan Higler

25 October 2025 10	Sparta Rotterdam	1–0	Telstar	Rotterdam
18:45 CEST (UTC+2)	Lauritsen 25', (yellow card) 31'; Sambo (yellow card) 45+4'; Van Aanholt (yellow card) 90+4'	Report	Brouwer (yellow card) 34'; Koswal (yellow card) 71'	Stadium: Sparta Stadion Het Kasteel; Attendance: 10,110; Referee: Joey Kooij

1 November 2025 11	Telstar	2–2	Excelsior	Velsen-Zuid
21:00 CET (UTC+1)	Ritmeester van de Kamp 2'; Owusu 28'; Bakker (penalty missed) 59'	Report	Zagré (yellow card) 32', (goal) 44' (pen.), (penalty missed) 75'; De Regt 77'; Bronkhorst (yellow card) 90'	Stadium: BUKO Stadion; Attendance: 5,270; Referee: Martin van den Kerkhof

7 November 2025 12	Twente	0–0	Telstar	Enschede
20:00 CET (UTC+1)	Pröpper (yellow card) 33'; Pjaca (yellow card) 53'; Hlynsson (yellow card) 90' (yellow-red card) 90+7'	Report	Koswal (yellow card) 83'; Tejan (yellow card) 89'; Hamdaoui (red card) 90'	Stadium: De Grolsch Veste; Attendance: 29,500; Referee: Martijn Vos

23 November 2025 13	Telstar	1–1	Utrecht	Velsen-Zuid
14:30 CET (UTC+1)	Lechkar (yellow card) 2'; Hetli 56'; Offerhaus (yellow card) 70'	Report	Haller (yellow card) 64'; Engwanda (yellow card) 66'; Bozdoğan 90+3'	Stadium: BUKO Stadion; Attendance: 4,500; Referee: Robin Hensgens

30 November 2025 14	Telstar	1–2	Feyenoord	Velsen-Zuid
14:30 CET (UTC+1)	Tejan 89'	Report	Offerhaus 25' (o.g.); Hadj Moussa 63'; Nieuwkoop (yellow card) 38'; Ueda (yellow card) 48'; Van Persie (yellow card) 90+4'	Stadium: BUKO Stadion; Referee: Sander van der Eijk

6 December 2025 15	Heracles Almelo	1–1	Telstar	Almelo
20:00 CET (UTC+1)	Zamburek (yellow card) 32'; Hornkamp (yellow card) 54'; Mesík (yellow card) 84', (goal) 90+3'	Report	Nwankwo (yellow card) 27'; Zonneveld 67'; Noslin (yellow card) 85'	Stadium: Asito Stadion; Attendance: 12,046; Referee: Danny Makkelie

13 December 2025 16	Telstar	2–2	NEC	Velsen-Zuid
16:30 CET (UTC+1)	Hardeveld 21', 61'	Report	Chery (yellow card) 4'; Önal (yellow card) 26'; Linssen 42'; Shiogai 77'	Stadium: BUKO Stadion; Attendance: 5,293; Referee: Richard Martens

20 December 2025 17	NAC Breda	0–1	Telstar	Breda
21:00 CET (UTC+1)	Mahmutović (yellow card) 87'; van Hooijdonk (yellow card) 90+4'	Report	Noslin (yellow card) 49'; Owusu (yellow card) 64'; Brouwer 77'; Tejan (yellow card) 90+4'	Stadium: Rat Verlegh Stadion; Attendance: 19,912; Referee: Rob Dieperink

11 January 2026 18	Telstar	2–3	Ajax	Velsen-Zuid
14:30 CET (UTC+1)	Hatenboer (red card) 53'; Lechkar (yellow card) 64'; Baas 78' (o.g.); Bakker 84'	Report	Gloukh 11'; Godts 14'; Baas 72'; Dolberg (yellow card) 74'	Stadium: BUKO Stadion; Attendance: 5,920; Referee: Jeroen Manschot

16 January 2026 19	Excelsior	2–2	Telstar	Rotterdam
20:00 CET (UTC+1)	Hartjes (yellow card) 59'; Yegoian 75'; Naujoks (yellow card) 72', (goal) 81'; Nadje (yellow card) 87'	Report	van de Kamp 52'; Rossen 57'	Stadium: Stadion Woudestein; Attendance: 4,600; Referee: Bas Nijhuis

25 January 2026 20	Telstar	0–1	AZ	Velsen-Zuid
12:15 CET (UTC+1)	Koopmeiners (yellow card) 26'; Goes (yellow card) 54'; Jensen 78'	Report	Tejan (yellow card) 80'	Stadium: BUKO Stadion; Attendance: 5,293; Referee: Robin Hensgens

31 January 2026 21	PEC Zwolle	4–1	Telstar	Zwolle
18:45 CET (UTC+1)	Shoretire 45+3'; Kostons 67', 83'; Gooijer 70'	Report	Rossen 60'	Stadium: MAC³PARK Stadion; Attendance: 13,910; Referee: Alex Bos

8 February 2026 22	Go Ahead Eagles	1–1	Telstar	Deventer
14:30 CET (UTC+1)	Adelgaard (yellow card) 70'; Sigurðarson 85'	Report	Hardeveld 90+5'	Stadium: De Adelaarshorst; Attendance: 8,763; Referee: Dennis Johan Higler

15 February 2026 23	Telstar	1–1	Twente	Velsen-Zuid
14:30 CET (UTC+1)	Van Duijn 17'; Ritmeester van de Kamp (yellow card) 90'	Report	Van den Belt (yellow card) 25'; Pjaca 83'	Stadium: BUKO Stadion; Attendance: 5,302; Referee: Stan Teuben

22 February 2026 24	Feyenoord	2–1	Telstar	Rotterdam
20:00 CET (UTC+1)	Hadj Moussa 30', 39'; Valente (yellow card) 88'	Report	Van Duijn (yellow card) 9'; Ritmeester van de Kamp 14'	Stadium: De Kuip; Attendance: 47,500; Referee: Sander van der Eijk

27 February 2026 25	Telstar	3–0	NAC Breda	Velsen-Zuid
20:00 CET (UTC+1)	Ritmeester van de Kamp 38', 83'; Offerhaus (yellow card) 64'; Brouwer 85'	Report	Leemans (yellow card) 26'; Hillen (yellow card) 71'; Nassoh (yellow card) 74'; Reulen (yellow card) 79'	Stadium: BUKO Stadion; Attendance: 5,302; Referee: Serdar Gözübüyük

8 March 2026 26	Fortuna Sittard	1–4	Telstar	Sittard
14:30 CET (UTC+1)	Sierhuis 22'; Kasanwirjo (yellow card) 54'; Seedorf (yellow card) 54'	Report	Brouwer 5', 50'; Þórisson 7'; Bakker 65'	Stadium: Fortuna Sittard Stadion; Attendance: 11,035; Referee: Joey Kooij

14 March 2026 27	Heerenveen	3–0	Telstar	Heerenveen
20:00 CET (UTC+1)	Nordås (yellow card) 7', (goal) 24'; Rivera 56', (yellow card) 85'; Trenskow 71'; Linday (yellow card) 65'	Report	Offerhaus (yellow card) 54'	Stadium: Abe Lenstra Stadion; Attendance: 24,200; Referee: Sander van der Eijk

22 March 2026 28	Telstar	3–1	PSV	Velsen-Zuid
20:00 CET (UTC+1)	Brouwer 45+3'; Koswal (yellow card) 53'; Van Duijn 66'; Tejan 74'	Report	Salah-Eddine (red card) 39'; Sildillia 47'; Saibari (yellow card) 82'	Stadium: BUKO Stadion; Attendance: 5,302; Referee: Marc Nagtegaal

4 April 2026 29	Telstar	0–2	Groningen	Velsen-Zuid
14:30 CEST (UTC+2)	Owusu (yellow card) 66'	Report	Vaessen (yellow card) 12'; Janse 32'; Van Bergen (yellow card) 52'; Schreuders 90+5'	Stadium: BUKO Stadion; Attendance: 5,302; Referee: Jannick van der Laan

11 April 2026 30	Utrecht	4–1	Telstar	Utrecht
16:30 CEST (UTC+2)	Didden 10'; El Karouani (yellow card) 52'; Zechiël 61'; de Wit (yellow card) 67', (goal) 72'; Karlsson 90+1'	Report	Neville Ogidi Nwankwo (yellow card) 48'; Bakker 58'	Stadium: Stadion Galgenwaard; Attendance: 23,011; Referee: Danny Makkelie

22 April 2026 31	Telstar	4–1	Sparta Rotterdam	Velsen-Zuid
20:00 CEST (UTC+2)	Hardeveld 33'; van Duijn 72', 78'; Ritmeester van de Kamp (yellow card) 83'; Brouwer (yellow card) 83'; Seedorf 88'	Report	Zonneveld 31'	Stadium: BUKO Stadion; Attendance: 5,302; Referee: Erwin Blank

2 May 2026 32	NEC	1–1	Telstar	Nijmegen
21:00 CEST (UTC+2)	Sandler (yellow card) 21'; Lebreton (yellow card) 30'; Chery 85'; Fonville (yellow card) 90+1'	Report	Van Duijn 32'; Offerhaus (yellow card) 37'; Koeman Jr. (yellow card) 82'	Stadium: Goffertstadion; Attendance: 12,650; Referee: Jeroen Manschot

10 May 2026 33	Telstar	3–0	Heracles Almelo	Velsen-Zuid
16:45 CEST (UTC+2)	Offerhaus 70'; Noslin 72'; Hardeveld 77'; Tejan (yellow card) 82'	Report	Benita (yellow card) 27'; Kulenović (yellow card) 45', (red card) 90+2'; Van Gilst (yellow card) 52'	Stadium: BUKO Stadion; Attendance: 5,142; Referee: Serdar Gözübüyük

17 May 2026 34	Volendam	1–2	Telstar	Volendam
14:30 CEST (UTC+2)	Descotte 2'; Leliendal (yellow card) 27'; Verschuren (yellow card) 50'	Report	Bakker 44'; Noslin (yellow card) 61'; Koeman Jr. 89' (pen.), (yellow card) 89'	Stadium: Kras Stadion; Attendance: 7,117; Referee: Marc Nagtegaal

=== KNVB Cup ===
As an Eredivisie side, Telstar will enter the KNVB Cup in the first round.

Win Draw Loss Fixtures

29 October 2025 First round	Lisse	0–5	Telstar	Lisse
20:00 CET (UTC+1)		Report	Bakker 14' (pen.); Zonneveld 34', 42', 48'; Noslin 56'	Stadium: Ter Specke; Attendance: 3,000; Referee: Rick Sturm

16 December 2025 Second round	Hoek	1–4	Telstar	Hoek
20:00 CET (UTC+1)	Van Hauter (yellow card) 77'; Martens 81'; Den Engelsman (yellow card) 90+1'		Bakker (yellow card) 12'; Owusu 33'; Brouwer 49'; Offerhaus 79'; Neville Ogidi Nwankwo (yellow card) 90+1'; Zonneveld 90+4'	Stadium: Sportpark Denoek; Referee: Martin van den Kerkhof

14 January 2026 Round of 16	Almere City	1–3	Telstar	Almere
20:00 CET (UTC+1)	Foah-Sam (yellow card) 41'; Burgering 85'	Report	Zonneveld 1'; Bakker (yellow card) 44'; Brouwer 48'; Offerhaus 62'; Tejan (yellow card) 90+1'	Stadium: Yanmar Stadion; Attendance: 3,110; Referee: Ingmar Oostrom

5 February 2026 Quarter-finals	Telstar	2–1	Go Ahead Eagles	Velsen-Zuid
20:00 CET (UTC+1)	Hetli 45'; Hardeveld 59' (pen.)	Report	Sampsted 52'; Dirksen (yellow card) 44'	Stadium: BUKO Stadion; Attendance: 5,293; Referee: Rob Dieperink

4 March 2026 Semi-finals	AZ	2–1	Telstar	Alkmaar
20:00 CET (UTC+1)	Dijkstra (yellow card) 29'; Bakker 47' (o.g.); Neville Ogidi Nwankwo 51' (o.g.)	Report	Tejan 74'; Brouwer (yellow card) 90+1'	Stadium: AFAS Stadion; Attendance: 18,402; Referee: Jeroen Manschot

== Statistics ==
- Italics indicates the player has been loaned in.
- ~~Strikethrough~~ indicates the player has been transferred to another club.
- Players with no appearances are not included on the list

=== Appearances and goals ===
No.	Pos	Nat	Player	Total		Eredivisie		KNVB Cup	
No.	Pos	Nat	Player	Apps	Goals	Apps	Goals	Apps	Goals
1	GK	(Netherlands) NED	Ronald Koeman Jr.	37	1	33+0	1	4+0	0
2	DF	(Netherlands) NED	Jeff Hardeveld	39	7	34+0	6	5+0	1
3	DF	(Netherlands) NED	Gerald Alders	9	0	5+2	0	2+0	0
4	DF	(Netherlands) NED	Guus Offerhaus	38	3	33+0	1	5+0	2
5	DF	(Netherlands) NED	Nigel Ogidi Nwankwo	7	0	0+4	0	0+3	0
6	DF	(Netherlands) NED	Danny Bakker	35	5	29+1	4	4+1	1
7	FW	(Netherlands) NED	Soufiane Hetli	34	4	19+12	3	1+2	1
8	MF	(Netherlands) NED	Tyrone Owusu	26	3	20+2	2	2+2	1
9	FW	(Netherlands) NED	~~Milan Zonneveld~~	23	7	8+12	2	3+0	5
9	FW	(Netherlands) NED	Jelani Seedorf	13	1	0+12	1	0+1	0
10	MF	(Netherlands) NED	~~Mohamed Hamdaoui~~	9	0	0+7	0	0+2	0
11	DF	(Curaçao) CUW	Tyrese Noslin	39	3	26+8	2	4+1	1
14	DF	(Netherlands) NED	Neville Ogidi Nwankwo	32	0	26+2	0	4+0	0
15	DF	(Netherlands) NED	Adil Lechkar	20	0	1+15	0	0+4	0
16	MF	(Netherlands) NED	Dylan Mertens	24	0	4+16	0	0+4	0
17	MF	(Netherlands) NED	Nils Rossen	33	3	26+2	3	5+0	0
19	FW	(Netherlands) NED	~~Sebastiaan Hagedoorn~~	9	0	0+8	0	0+1	0
19	FW	(Iceland) ISL	Nökkvi Þeyr Þórisson	8	1	7+0	1	1+0	0
20	GK	(Netherlands) NED	Daan Reiziger	3	0	1+1	0	1+0	0
21	DF	(Suriname) SUR	Devon Koswal	27	0	18+7	0	2+0	0
23	MF	(Netherlands) NED	Cedric Hatenboer	17	0	15+0	0	2+0	0
27	FW	(Netherlands) NED	Patrick Brouwer	32	9	28+2	7	2+0	2
28	DF	(Suriname) SUR	Rojendro Oudsten	8	0	0+8	0	0+0	0
29	DF	(Suriname) SUR	Dion Malone	11	0	0+11	0	0+0	0
30	FW	(Netherlands) NED	Kay Tejan	32	4	6+22	3	1+3	1
37	FW	(Netherlands) NED	Sem van Duijn	16	5	12+2	5	2+0	0
39	MF	(Netherlands) NED	Jochem Ritmeester van de Kamp	33	7	23+5	7	5+0	0

=== Disciplinary record ===
Includes all competitive matches. The list is sorted by squad number when disciplinary points / points per card / number of cards are equal. Players with no cards not included in the list.

Rank	No.	Pos.	Nat.	Name	Eredivisie			KNVB Cup			Total			
Rank	No.	Pos.	Nat.	Name	Yellow card	Second yellow card	Red card	Yellow card	Second yellow card	Red card	Yellow card	Second yellow card	Red card	
1	4	DF	(Netherlands)	Guus Offerhaus	6	0	0	1	0	0	7	0	0	
2	11	DF	(Netherlands)	Tyrese Noslin	5	0	0	0	0	0	5	0	0	
2	30	FW	(Netherlands)	Kay Tejan	4	0	0	1	0	0	5	0	0	
4	14	DF	(Netherlands)	Neville Ogidi Nwankwo	3	0	0	1	0	0	4	0	0	
4	21	DF	(Suriname)	Devon Koswal	4	0	0	0	0	0	4	0	0	
4	39	MF	(Netherlands)	Jochem Ritmeester van de Kamp	4	0	0	0	0	0	4	0	0	
7	1	GK	(Netherlands)	Ronald Koeman Jr.	3	0	0	0	0	0	3	0	0	
7	27	FW	(Netherlands)	Patrick Brouwer	2	0	0	1	0	0	3	0	0	
9	6	DF	(Netherlands)	Danny Bakker	0	0	0	2	0	0	2	0	0	
9	7	FW	(Netherlands)	Soufiane Hetli	2	0	0	0	0	0	2	0	0	
9	15	DF	(Netherlands)	Adil Lechkar	2	0	0	0	0	0	2	0	0	
9	16	MF	(Netherlands)	Dylan Mertens	2	0	0	0	0	0	2	0	0	
13	23	MF	(Netherlands)	Cedric Hatenboer	0	0	1	0	0	0	0	0	1	
14	2	DF	(Netherlands)	Jeff Hardeveld	1	0	0	0	0	0	1	0	0	
14	8	MF	(Netherlands)	Tyrone Owusu	1	0	0	0	0	0	1	0	0	
14	9	FW	(Netherlands)	Jelani Seedorf	1	0	0	0	0	0	1	0	0	
14	28	DF	(Suriname)	Rojendro Oudsten	1	0	0	0	0	0	1	0	0	
14	37	FW	(Netherlands)	Sem van Duijn	1	0	0	0	0	0	1	0	0	
14	Total					42	0	1	6	0	0	48	0	1
