= Rojendro Oudsten =

Footballer (born 2007)

- Oudsten with Telstar in 2026

Personal information
- Full name: Rojendro Jeveraino Oudsten
- Date of birth: 12 November 2007 (age 19)
- Place of birth: Amsterdam, Netherlands
- Height: 1.78 m (5 ft 10 in)
- Positions: Right-back; midfielder

Team information
- Current team: Telstar
- Number: 28

Youth career
- Zeeburgia
- –2022: FC Amsterdam
- 2022–2025: Telstar

Senior career*
| Years | Team | Apps | (Gls) |
| 2025– | Telstar | 15 | (0) |

International career^{‡}
| 2023 | Suriname U17 | 3 | (0) |
| 2026– | Suriname U20 | 5 | (0) |
- * Club domestic league appearances and goals as of 20:02, 11 November 2026 (UTC) ‡ National team caps and goals as of 4 March 2026

Rojendro Jeveraino Oudsten (born 12 November 2007) is a professional footballer who plays as a right-back or midfielder for Eredivisie club Telstar. Born in the Netherlands, he has represented Suriname at youth international level.

Oudsten came through the youth system of Telstar after playing for amateur clubs in Amsterdam. He signed his first professional contract in August 2025 and made his Eredivisie debut the following month, aged 17. That made him the second-youngest Telstar player ever to appear in the Eredivisie.

He has played for Suriname at under-17 and under-20 level.

== Early life ==
Oudsten was born in Amsterdam and is of Surinamese descent. He is a cousin of former professional footballer Kelvin Maynard, who died in 2019.

== Club career ==
=== Youth career ===
Oudsten played youth football in Amsterdam for the amateur clubs Zeeburgia and FC Amsterdam. In 2022 he joined the academy of Telstar.

=== Telstar ===
Oudsten was invited to train with the first team during pre-season for the 2025–26 campaign, Telstar's first in the Eredivisie for 47 years. After impressing, he signed his first professional contract on 8 August 2025, running until the summer of 2028.

He made his professional debut on 20 September 2025 in a 2–0 defeat away to Groningen. Head coach Anthony Correia brought him on after 62 minutes. Within two minutes he had been booked for a late challenge, a decision he afterwards considered harsh. His parents were unable to attend but watched the match on television. At 17 years and 312 days, he became the second-youngest player to represent Telstar in the Eredivisie, behind Ruud Geels. He made several more appearances from the bench over the season, all as a substitute. Telstar finished the season clear of the relegation places and kept their Eredivisie status.

Correia left at the end of the season and was replaced by Henk Brugge, who switched Telstar from a back five to a back four. For the 2026–27 season, Oudsten was registered as a defender.

== International career ==
Oudsten is eligible to represent both the Netherlands and Suriname. He was named in Suriname's squad for the 2023 CONCACAF U-17 Championship in Guatemala. Suriname lost all three of their group matches, against Honduras, Haiti and El Salvador.

In February 2026, head coach Werner Blackson included him in the final Suriname under-20 squad for 2026 CONCACAF U-20 Championship qualifying in Nicaragua. Suriname finished level on 12 points with El Salvador after a 2–0 win over them in the final match. They missed out on the group title, and qualification for the final tournament, on goal difference.

== Personal life ==
Oudsten wears the number 28 shirt at Telstar in tribute to his late cousin Kelvin Maynard. During his first season as a professional, he commuted from Amsterdam to Velsen-Zuid with teammate Tyrese Noslin, whom he described as being like a brother to him.

== Career statistics ==
As of match played 7 November 2026

Appearances and goals by club, season and competition
| Club | Season | League | | | KNVB Cup | | Other | | Total | |
| Club | Season | Division | Apps | Goals | Apps | Goals | Apps | Goals | Apps | Goals |
|---|---|---|---|---|---|---|---|---|---|---|
| Telstar | 2025–26 | Eredivisie | 8 | 0 | 0 | 0 | — | | 8 | 0 |
| Telstar | 2026–27 | Eredivisie | 7 | 0 | 0 | 0 | — | | 7 | 0 |
| Career total | | | 15 | 0 | 0 | 0 | 0 | 0 | 15 | 0 |
