= Jelani Seedorf =

Dutch footballer (born 2004)

- Seedorf with Telstar in 2026

Personal information
- Date of birth: 12 December 2004 (age 21)
- Place of birth: Capelle aan den IJssel, Netherlands
- Position: Striker

Team information
- Current team: Telstar
- Number: 9

Youth career
- Alexandria '66
- 2021–2025: Excelsior

Senior career*
Years	Team	Apps	(Gls)
2024–2025	Excelsior	1	(0)
2025–2026	Jong Sparta	30	(21)
2025–2026	Sparta Rotterdam	1	(0)
2026–	Telstar	23	(1)
- * Club domestic league appearances and goals as of 18:41, 9 November 2026 (UTC)

Jelani Seedorf (born 12 December 2004) is a Dutch professional footballer who plays as a striker for Eredivisie club Telstar.

A product of the Excelsior academy, Seedorf made his professional debut for the club in 2024 in the Eerste Divisie. He then moved across the city to Sparta Rotterdam, where he scored regularly for the reserve team and made his Eredivisie debut. He joined Telstar in February 2026 as part of an exchange deal.

== Early life ==
Seedorf was born in Capelle aan den IJssel and is of Surinamese descent. He is a distant relative of former Netherlands international Clarence Seedorf and a member of the Seedorf family.

== Career ==
=== Excelsior ===
Seedorf played youth football for Alexandria '66. In 2021, aged 16, he joined the academy of Excelsior. He made his professional debut on 29 November 2024 in the Eerste Divisie. Head coach Ruben den Uil brought him on in the closing minutes in place of Noah Naujoks, as Excelsior beat Jong Ajax 2–0. It proved to be his only first-team appearance for the club. He was more prolific for the under-21 side under coach Thomas Verhaar, scoring 14 goals in 11 matches during the first half of the 2024–25 season.

=== Sparta Rotterdam ===
On 4 February 2025, Seedorf moved to city rivals Sparta Rotterdam on an amateur basis to play for their reserve side, Jong Sparta, in the Tweede Divisie. He scored nine goals in 15 matches during the rest of the season. In the first half of the 2025–26 campaign he added 13 goals in 17 matches.

His form earned him a place in the first-team squad. On 2 November 2025, head coach Maurice Steijn brought him on for his Eredivisie debut in place of Mitchell van Bergen, in a 1–0 home defeat to AZ decided by a goal from Kees Smit. It was his only Eredivisie appearance for Sparta. He left the club having scored 22 goals in 32 matches for Jong Sparta.

=== Telstar ===
On 3 February 2026, Seedorf joined fellow Eredivisie club Telstar as part of an exchange deal. Striker Milan Zonneveld moved to Sparta, while Nökkvi Þórisson joined Telstar on loan. Seedorf signed a contract running for two and a half years. His contract at Sparta had been due to run until mid-2027, with an option for a further year. Local press described the move as a chance for him to gain experience at a higher level.

Seedorf made his Telstar debut two days later in the KNVB Cup. Head coach Anthony Correia brought him on late in place of Soufiane Hetli as Telstar beat cup holders Go Ahead Eagles 2–1. His first goal for the club came on 22 April 2026 against his former club Sparta. He came off the bench late in the game and scored with his first touch to complete a 4–1 win, which lifted Telstar out of the relegation play-off place. Afterwards, he admitted he had had a point to prove against Sparta. All of his appearances in the second half of the season came as a substitute. Telstar finished 14th and avoided relegation.

Seedorf started the opening match of the 2026–27 season on 8 August 2026, a 2–1 win away to NEC. He went on to feature regularly in the opening months of the season, including as a substitute in a 4–3 home defeat to Feyenoord on 17 October.

== Career statistics ==
As of match played 7 November 2026

Appearances and goals by club, season and competition
Club	Season	League			Cup		Other		Total	
Club	Season	Division	Apps	Goals	Apps	Goals	Apps	Goals	Apps	Goals
Excelsior	2024–25	Eerste Divisie	1	0	0	0	—		1	0
Jong Sparta	2024–25	Tweede Divisie	13	8	—		2 (Note: Appearances in U21 promotion/relegation playoffs)	1	15	9
Jong Sparta	2025–26	Tweede Divisie	17	13	—		—		17	13
Jong Sparta	Total		30	21	—		2	1	32	22
Sparta Rotterdam	2025–26	Eredivisie	1	0	0	0	—		1	0
Telstar	2025–26	Eredivisie	12	1	1	0	—		13	1
Telstar	2026–27	Eredivisie	11	0	1	0	—		12	0
Telstar	Total		23	1	2	0	—		25	1
Career total			55	22	2	0	2	1	59	23
