= Nigel Ogidi Nwankwo =

Dutch footballer (born 1998)

Personal information
- Date of birth: 4 August 1998 (age 28)
- Place of birth: The Hague, Netherlands
- Height: 1.83 m (6 ft 0 in)
- Position: Left-back

Team information
- Current team: Telstar
- Number: 15

Youth career
- VUC
- FC Rijswijk
- 2005–2018: ADO Den Haag

Senior career*
| Years | Team | Apps | (Gls) |
| 2018–2019 | Westlandia | 28 | (2) |
| 2019–2020 | Scheveningen | 20 | (0) |
| 2020–2025 | Quick Boys | 145 | (5) |
| 2025– | Telstar | 4 | (0) |
- * Club domestic league appearances and goals as of 09:43, 21 March 2026 (UTC)

Nigel Ogidi Nwankwo (born 4 August 1998) is a Dutch professional footballer who plays as a left-back for Eredivisie club Telstar.

== Club career ==
=== Early years ===
Born in The Hague, Nwankwo played youth football for VUC and FC Rijswijk before joining the academy of ADO Den Haag. In 2018, he moved to Westlandia to play senior football, and the following season he signed for Scheveningen in the Tweede Divisie.

=== Quick Boys ===
On 24 December 2019, Nwankwo agreed to join Quick Boys. He became a regular at left-back and in January 2023 extended his contract for two further seasons. The club won the Tweede Divisie title in the 2024–25 season.

=== Telstar ===
On 8 February 2025, Quick Boys announced that Nwankwo would join Telstar on a contract to June 2027, with a club option for a further season. Months later, the club won promotion to the top flight via play-offs, returning to the Eredivisie for the first time in 47 years. Nwankwo was signed as back-up left-back to Jeff Hardeveld.

Nwankwo made his Eredivisie debut on 11 August 2025 in a 2–0 away defeat to Ajax, coming on in the 67th minute for Patrick Brouwer.

== Style of play ==
Primarily a left-sided defender, Ogidi Nwankwo operates as a modern wing-back or left-back noted for pace, stamina and direct ball-carrying on the overlap. His performances in the Dutch lower leagues were marked by physical strength, "impressive rushes" and a consistent work rate, while coaches also highlighted his ability to progress play from the flank. Upon stepping up to the professional game with Telstar, head coach Anthony Correia characterised him as "the ultimate wing-back" on account of his attacking qualities.

== Personal life ==
Nwankwo's mother is Surinamese and his father is Nigerian. His younger brother, Neville Ogidi Nwankwo, is also a professional footballer; the pair played together for the first time for Quick Boys in October 2024 and were later team-mates at Telstar.

== Career statistics ==
As of match played 5 February 2026

Appearances and goals by club, season and competition
| Club | Season | League | | | KNVB Cup | | Other | | Total | |
| Club | Season | Division | Apps | Goals | Apps | Goals | Apps | Goals | Apps | Goals |
|---|---|---|---|---|---|---|---|---|---|---|
| Westlandia | 2018–19 | Derde Divisie | 28 | 2 | 3 | 0 | — | | 32 | 2 |
| Scheveningen | 2019–20 | Tweede Divisie | 20 | 0 | 1 | 0 | — | | 21 | 0 |
| Quick Boys | 2020–21 | Tweede Divisie | 22 | 0 | 1 | 0 | — | | 23 | 0 |
| Quick Boys | 2021–22 | Tweede Divisie | 30 | 1 | 1 | 0 | — | | 31 | 1 |
| Quick Boys | 2022–23 | Tweede Divisie | 28 | 0 | 0 | 0 | — | | 28 | 0 |
| Quick Boys | 2023–24 | Tweede Divisie | 33 | 2 | 4 | 1 | — | | 37 | 3 |
| Quick Boys | 2024–25 | Tweede Divisie | 32 | 2 | 2 | 0 | — | | 34 | 2 |
| Quick Boys | Total | | 145 | 5 | 8 | 1 | — | | 153 | 6 |
| Telstar | 2025–26 | Eredivisie | 4 | 0 | 2 | 0 | — | | 6 | 0 |
| Telstar | 2026–27 | Eredivisie | 0 | 0 | 0 | 0 | — | | 0 | 0 |
| Telstar | Total | | 0 | 0 | 0 | 0 | — | | 0 | 0 |
| Career total | | | 197 | 7 | 14 | 1 | 0 | 0 | 211 | 8 |

== Honours ==
Quick Boys

- Tweede Divisie: 2024–25
