= Tyrone Owusu =

Dutch footballer (born 2004)

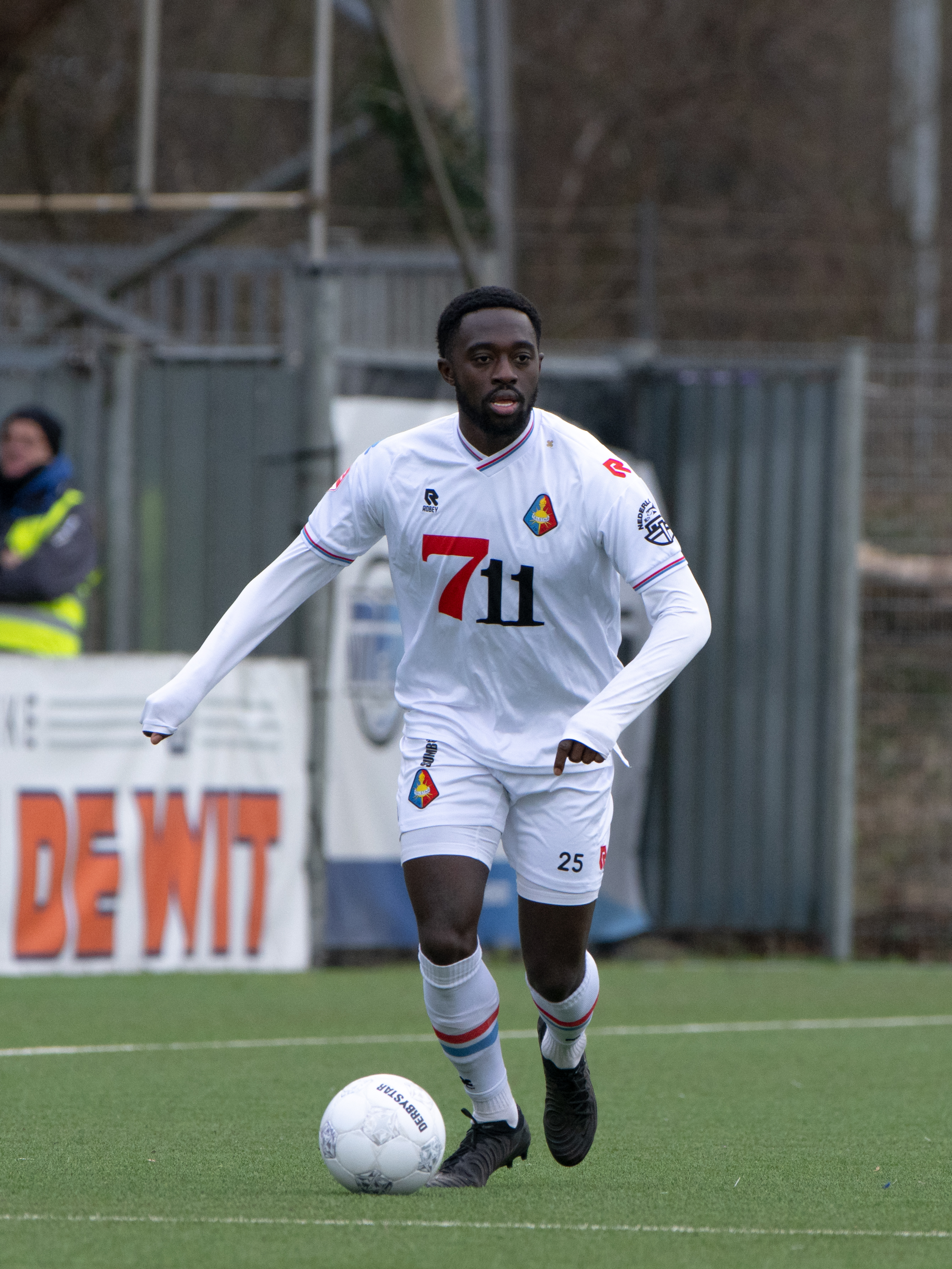
- Owusu with Telstar in 2025

Personal information
- Date of birth: 5 March 1999 (age 27)
- Place of birth: The Hague, Netherlands
- Height: 1.81 m (5 ft 11 in)
- Position: Midfielder

Team information
- Current team: Telstar
- Number: 10

Youth career
- 2008–2019: ADO Den Haag

Senior career*
Years	Team	Apps	(Gls)
2019–2020	Westlandia	16	(1)
2020–2022	Scheveningen	33	(2)
2022–2024	Quick Boys	60	(1)
2024–	Telstar	57	(7)
- * Club domestic league appearances and goals as of 12:21, 14 October 2026 (UTC)

Tyrone Owusu (born 5 March 1999) is a Dutch professional footballer who plays as a midfielder for Eredivisie club Telstar.

== Career ==
=== Early years ===
Owusu was born in The Hague and spent a decade in the youth system of ADO Den Haag. He joined ADO's academy as a youth and remained there until 2018, but did not break into the club's first team. Seeking senior football experience, Owusu left ADO and signed with local amateur side Westlandia in 2019. After a season in the Derde Divisie with Westlandia, he moved up to Tweede Divisie club Scheveningen in 2020.

In November 2021, Owusu became the first signing announced by Quick Boys ahead of the 2022–23 season. He joined from Scheveningen, where he had been a regular starter during the early part of the 2021–22 campaign, making 11 appearances and scoring twice. Owusu signed a one-year contract with an option for a second season, and quickly established himself as an important figure at Quick Boys. Initially deployed as a right-sided defender, he was later converted into a central midfield role. Over two seasons at Nieuw Zuid, he made more than 50 league appearances, contributing one goal and eleven assists. His dynamic style of play and consistent performances—particularly during a notable run in the national cup—earned him recognition as a fan favourite.

=== Telstar ===
On 5 February 2024, Owusu signed a contract extension with Quick Boys, committing to the club until mid-2025 with an option for a further year, as part of the club's efforts to maintain squad continuity. Despite the renewal, interest from the professional ranks quickly followed. On 25 May 2024, he signed his first professional contract with Telstar of the Eerste Divisie, agreeing to a one-year deal with an option for a second season. He became the second player to move from Quick Boys to the Velsen-based side that year, following the earlier arrival of Guus Offerhaus. In a statement, Quick Boys acknowledged his departure, noting that although Owusu had recently pledged his future to the club, he "could not resist the call of Telstar" and the opportunity to play at a professional level.

Owusu officially joined Telstar ahead of the 2024–25 season. He made his professional debut on 27 October 2024 in a league match against Emmen, replacing Tyrese Noslin in the 75th minute of a 1–0 away victory at De Oude Meerdijk. By the end of the calendar year, he had established himself as a regular in midfield, leading the club to activate the option to extend his contract through the 2025–26 season. On 3 March 2025, Owusu scored his first professional goal, opening the score in a 2–1 away win over Jong AZ. He subsequently featured in all six matches of the promotion play-offs, providing two assists in the quarter-final against ADO Den Haag and another in the final against Willem II, contributing to Telstar's promotion to the Eredivisie.

Owusu made his Eredivisie debut on 10 August 2025, starting in a 2–0 defeat away to Ajax at the Johan Cruyff Arena. On 30 August, he scored his first Eredivisie goal, opening the scoring in the 21st minute with a right-footed shot from outside the box in a 2–0 away win over PSV; Telstar's first top-tier win since 1978. On 13 September, he extended his contract with Telstar until June 2027.

== Style of play ==
Owusu is a versatile player capable of operating as a defensive midfielder or as a right-back. During his time at Quick Boys he was converted from a full-back into a central midfield role, a position in which he excelled. Described by coaches as a dynamic and hard-working presence, Owusu combines strong defensive skills with good speed and technique. Quick Boys' technical staff lauded his "excellent basic technique" and ability to contribute both defensively and offensively, noting also that he can be deployed in multiple positions across the pitch. Similarly, Telstar's technical manager highlighted Owusu's versatility and energy, calling him a "very versatile and dynamic player" who comfortably plays in different roles as needed. These attributes have enabled Owusu to adapt from youth football into the senior game and eventually make the jump from amateur leagues to the professional level.

== Personal life ==
Owusu was born in the Netherlands and is of Ghanaian descent.

== Career statistics ==
As of match played 11 October 2026

Appearances and goals by club, season and competition
Club	Season	League			KNVB Cup		Other		Total	
Club	Season	Division	Apps	Goals	Apps	Goals	Apps	Goals	Apps	Goals
Westlandia	2019–20	Derde Divisie	16	1	2	0	—		18	1
Scheveningen	2020–21	Tweede Divisie	3	0	0	0	—		3	0
Scheveningen	2021–22	Tweede Divisie	30	2	1	0	—		31	2
Scheveningen	Total		33	2	1	0	—		34	2
Quick Boys	2022–23	Tweede Divisie	32	1	1	0	—		33	1
Quick Boys	2023–24	Tweede Divisie	28	0	4	0	—		32	0
Quick Boys	Total		60	1	5	0	—		65	1
Telstar	2024–25	Eerste Divisie	27	3	1	0	6 (Note: Appearances in Eredivisie promotion/relegation playoffs)	0	34	3
Telstar	2025–26	Eredivisie	22	2	4	1	—		26	3
Telstar	2026–27	Eredivisie	8	2	0	0	—		8	2
Telstar	Total		57	7	5	1	6	0	68	8
Career total			166	11	13	1	6	0	185	12
