= Sebastiaan Hagedoorn =

Dutch footballer (born 2004)

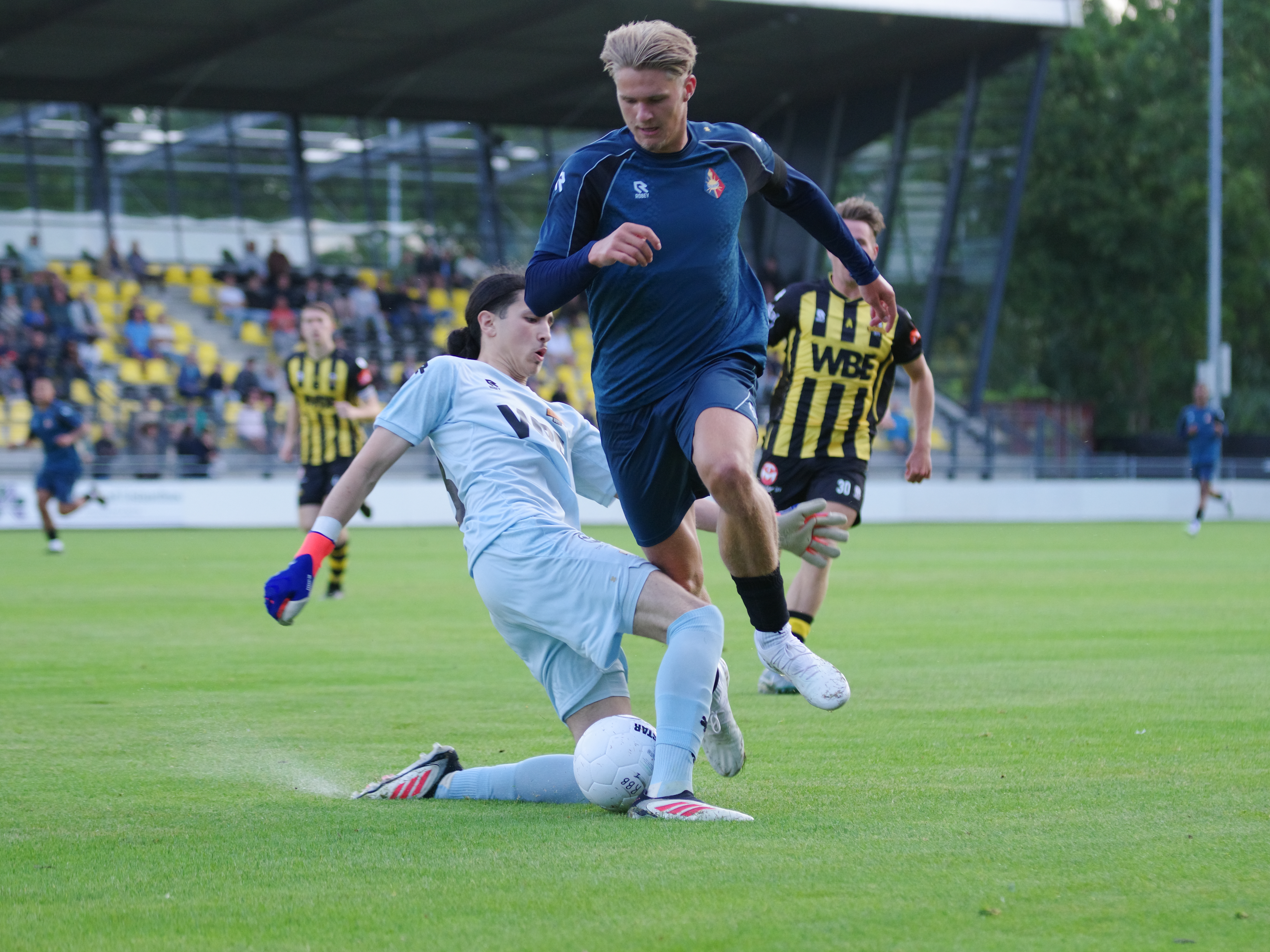
- Hagedoorn (2025)

Personal information
- Date of birth: 30 November 2004 (age 21)
- Place of birth: Amstelveen, Netherlands
- Position: Striker

Team information
- Current team: Jong Almere City
- Number: 57

Youth career
- 2016–2020: RAP
- 2020–2022: Heerenveen
- 2022–2024: Telstar

Senior career*
Years	Team	Apps	(Gls)
2024–2026	Telstar	24	(0)
2026–	Jong Almere City	15	(3)
- * Club domestic league appearances and goals as of 18:49, 25 July 2026 (UTC)

Sebastiaan Hagedoorn (born 30 November 2004) is a Dutch professional footballer who plays as a striker for Tweede Divisie club Jong Almere City.

== Career ==
Born in Amstelveen and raised in Aalsmeer, Hagedoorn began his career with local side RAP before joining the SC Heerenveen academy in 2020. He moved to Telstar in 2022 and made his first-team debut on the opening day of the 2024–25 season, replacing Zakaria Eddahchouri two minutes from full time in a 3–2 win away to Vitesse at the GelreDome. Three weeks later he signed his first professional contract with the club. Following the mid-season departure of top scorer Eddahchouri, he was promoted to understudy to Youssef El Kachati. He made 16 league appearances as a substitute and featured in four promotion play-off matches, including the final, where Telstar secured promotion to the Eredivisie for the first time in 47 years after they won 5–3 on aggregate against Willem II.

Hagedoorn enjoyed a strong 2025 pre-season, scoring in friendlies against ADO '20, Rijnsburgse Boys, Cambuur and Koninklijke HFC. He made his Eredivisie debut on 10 August 2025 in a 2–0 defeat away to Ajax, coming on in the 67th minute for Soufiane Hetli.

On 30 January 2026, Hagedoorn signed with Jong Almere City, the reserve team of Almere City that plays in the third-tier Tweede Divisie.

== Career statistics ==
As of match played 23 May 2026

Appearances and goals by club, season and competition
Club	Season	League			KNVB Cup		Other		Total	
Club	Season	Division	Apps	Goals	Apps	Goals	Apps	Goals	Apps	Goals
Telstar	2024–25	Eerste Divisie	16	0	0	0	4 (Note: Appearances in Eredivisie promotion/relegation playoffs)	0	20	0
Telstar	2025–26	Eredivisie	8	0	1	0	—		9	0
Telstar	Total		24	0	1	0	4	0	29	0
Jong Almere City	2025–26	Tweede Divisie	15	3	—		—		15	3
Jong Almere City	2026–27	Tweede Divisie	0	0	—		—		0	0
Jong Almere City	Total		15	3	—		—		15	3
Career total			39	3	1	0	4	0	44	3
