= Jochem Ritmeester van de Kamp =

Dutch footballer (born 2003)

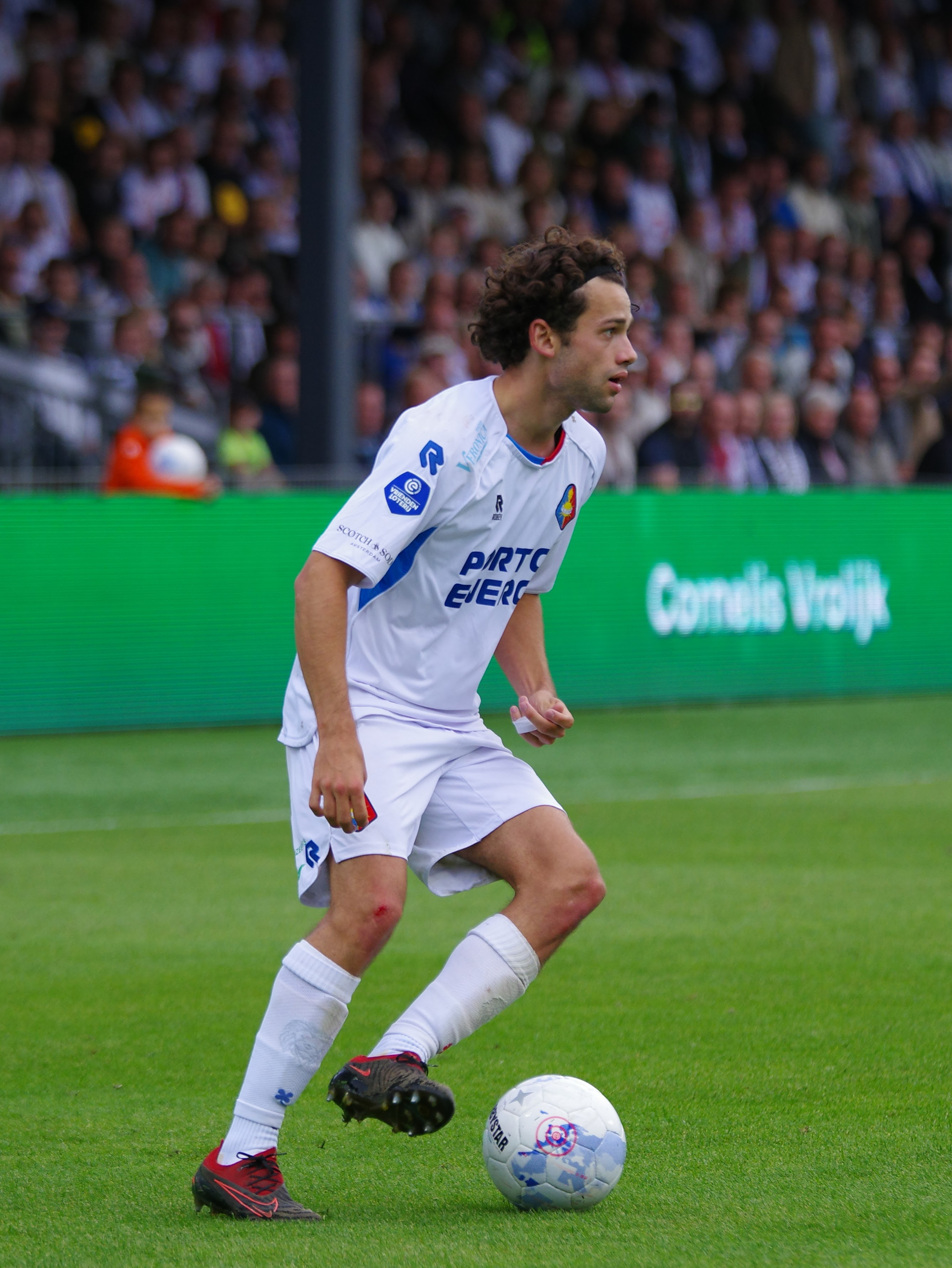
- Ritmeester van de Kamp with Telstar in 2025

Personal information
- Date of birth: 2 November 2003 (age 23)
- Place of birth: Laren, Netherlands
- Height: 1.80 m (5 ft 11 in)
- Position: Midfielder

Team information
- Current team: Almere City

Youth career
- –2013: Laren '99
- 2013–2022: Almere City

Senior career*
Years	Team	Apps	(Gls)
2022–	Almere City	70	(4)
2023	Jong Almere City	1	(1)
2025–2026	→ Telstar (loan)	28	(7)

International career^{‡}
2024	Netherlands U21	1	(0)
- * Club domestic league appearances and goals as of 20:58, 17 May 2026 (UTC) ‡ National team caps and goals as of 14 November 2024

Jochem Ritmeester van de Kamp (born 2 November 2003) is a Dutch professional footballer who plays as a midfielder for Eerste Divisie club Almere City.

== Career ==
=== Almere City ===
Ritmeester van de Kamp was born in Laren, North Holland. He began playing football at local club Laren '99 before joining the Almere City youth academy in 2013. In March 2022, he signed his first professional contract with the club, a three-year deal. He signed his first professional contract in March 2022; a three-year deal.

Ritmeester van de Kamp made his professional debut on 11 March 2022 in an Eerste Divisie match against Helmond Sport. He started the game on the bench, but head coach Alex Pastoor gave him his debut in the 85th minute when he came on for Tim Receveur. That appearance proved to be his only in the 2021–22 season, which Almere finished in 14th place.

On 20 January 2023, Ritmeester van de Kamp scored his first professional goal in a 2–2 draw against De Graafschap. He went on to make 14 league appearances, scoring twice, and also featured in six play-off matches as Almere secured promotion to the Eredivisie by defeating Emmen in the finals.

He made his Eredivisie debut on 13 August 2023, in a 4–1 defeat to Twente. On 27 August 2023, he scored his first Eredivisie goal in a 6–1 loss to Feyenoord, and on 12 November 2023, he scored his second in a 2–2 draw with Ajax.

==== Loan to Telstar ====
On 18 August 2025, Ritmeester van de Kamp joined newly promoted Telstar on a season-long loan from Almere City. The agreement contained no option to buy and was activated through a clause in his contract that permitted a temporary move to an Eredivisie club following Almere's relegation. He made his debut five days later, starting in a 2–2 home draw with FC Volendam and providing the assist for Soufiane Hetli's opening goal. On 14 September, he scored his first goal for the club in a 3–1 home defeat to Fortuna Sittard.

A regular during his loan at Telstar, Ritmeester van de Kamp played a more attacking role than at Almere and scored seven goals in 28 league appearances, helping the club secure survival on the final matchday.

==== Return to Almere City ====
Ritmeester van de Kamp returned to Almere City following the expiration of his loan spell. Despite reported transfer interest from various Eredivisie sides, no move materialised.

== Career statistics ==
As of match played 17 May 2026

Appearances and goals by club, season and competition
Club	Season	League			KNVB Cup		Other		Total	
Club	Season	Division	Apps	Goals	Apps	Goals	Apps	Goals	Apps	Goals
Almere City	2021–22	Eerste Divisie	1	0	0	0	—		1	0
Almere City	2022–23	Eerste Divisie	13	2	1	0	6 (Note: Appearances in Eerste Divisie promotion play-offs)	0	20	2
Almere City	2023–24	Eredivisie	30	2	3	0	—		33	2
Almere City	2024–25	Eredivisie	26	0	1	0	—		27	0
Almere City	Total		70	4	5	0	6	0	81	4
Jong Almere City	2023–24	Tweede Divisie	1	1	—		—		1	1
Telstar (loan)	2025–26	Eredivisie	28	7	5	0	—		33	7
Career total			99	12	10	0	6	0	115	12
