= Neville Ogidi Nwankwo =

Surinamese footballer (born 2002)

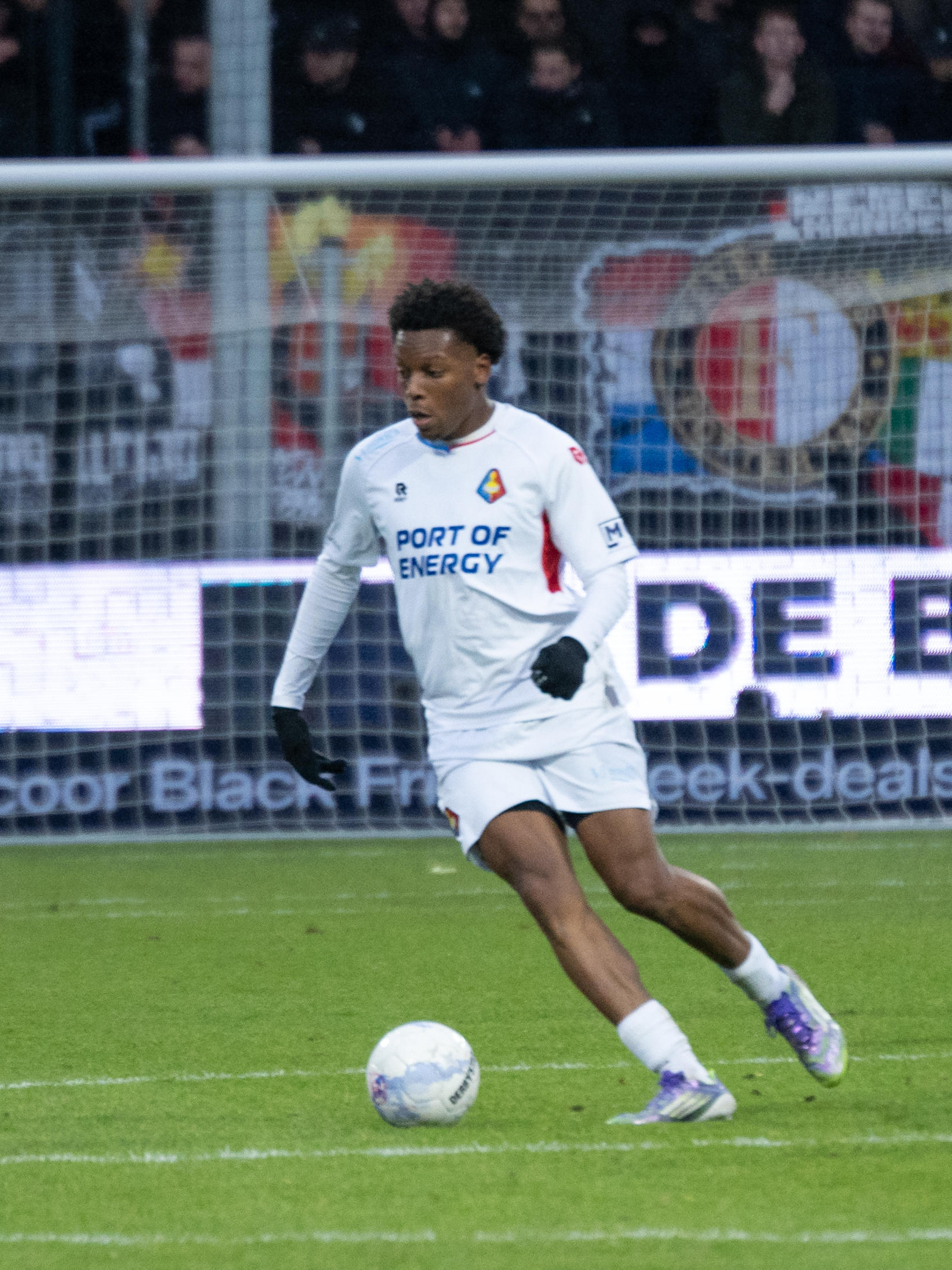
- Neville Ogidi Nwankwo (2025)

Personal information
- Date of birth: 8 October 2002 (age 24)
- Place of birth: The Hague, Netherlands
- Position: Centre-back

Team information
- Current team: Utrecht
- Number: 21

Youth career
- Haaglandia
- ADO Den Haag
- 2017–2020: DHC Delft
- 2020–2021: Westlandia

Senior career*
Years	Team	Apps	(Gls)
2021–2022	Westlandia	21	(2)
2022–2023	Rijnvogels	33	(1)
2023–2025	Quick Boys	18	(2)
2023–2024	→ Rijnvogels (loan)	14	(3)
2025–	Utrecht	2	(0)
2025–2026	→ Telstar (loan)	28	(0)

International career^{‡}
2026–	Suriname	1	(0)
- * Club domestic league appearances and goals as of 20:45, 22 August 2026 (UTC) ‡ National team caps and goals as of 3:55, 16 November 2026 (UTC)

Neville Ogidi Nwankwo (born 8 October 2002) is a professional footballer who plays as a centre-back for Eredivisie club Utrecht. Born in the Netherlands, he represents the Suriname national team.

== Club career ==
Born in The Hague, Nwankwo played youth football with Haaglandia, ADO Den Haag, DHC Delft and Westlandia before moving into senior football with Westlandia during the 2021–22 Derde Divisie season.

He joined FC Rijnvogels in June 2022, moving up from Westlandia, and on 4 January 2023 signed a two-year deal with Quick Boys, who loaned him back to Rijnvogels for the 2023–24 season.

On 16 January 2025, he scored for Quick Boys in a 3–2 extra-time win over Heerenveen in the KNVB Cup round of 16. He was part of the Quick Boys side that won the 2024–25 Tweede Divisie.

On 3 July 2025, he signed for Utrecht on a two-year contract with a two-year option and was immediately loaned to newly promoted Telstar for the 2025–26 Eredivisie season. He made his professional debut for Telstar on 14 September 2025 in a 3–1 home defeat to Fortuna Sittard, a match in which he appeared as a late substitute.

== International career ==
In November 2026, Nwankwo received his first call-up to the Suriname national football team under head coach Henk Fraser. The defender was selected for a friendly against Lithuania on 12 November 2026 in Kaunas. He was one of four players receiving their first senior international call-up, alongside Cheveyo Balentien, Mannou Berger and Sanjeev van Haren.

== Personal life ==
Nwankwo's mother is Surinamese and his father is Nigerian. His older brother, Nigel Ogidi Nwankwo, is also a professional footballer; the pair played together for the first time for Quick Boys in October 2024 and were later team-mates at Telstar.

== Career statistics ==
As of match played 22 August 2026

Appearances and goals by club, season and competition
Club	Season	League			KNVB Cup		Other		Total	
Club	Season	Division	Apps	Goals	Apps	Goals	Apps	Goals	Apps	Goals
Westlandia	2021–22	Derde Divisie	21	2	0	0	—		21	2
Rijnvogels	2022–23	Derde Divisie	33	1	2	0	—		35	1
Quick Boys	2023–24	Tweede Divisie	0	0	0	0	—		0	0
Quick Boys	2024–25	Tweede Divisie	18	2	4	1	—		22	3
Quick Boys	Total		18	2	4	1	—		22	3
Rijnvogels (loan)	2023–24	Derde Divisie	14	3	0	0	—		14	3
Utrecht	2025–26	Eredivisie	0	0	0	0	0	0	0	0
Utrecht	2026–27	Eredivisie	2	0	0	0	—		2	0
Utrecht	Total		2	0	0	0	0	0	2	0
Telstar (loan)	2025–26	Eredivisie	28	0	5	0	—		33	0
Career total			116	8	11	1	0	0	127	9

== Honours ==
Quick Boys

- Tweede Divisie: 2024–25
