= Devon Koswal =

Dutch footballer (born 2003)

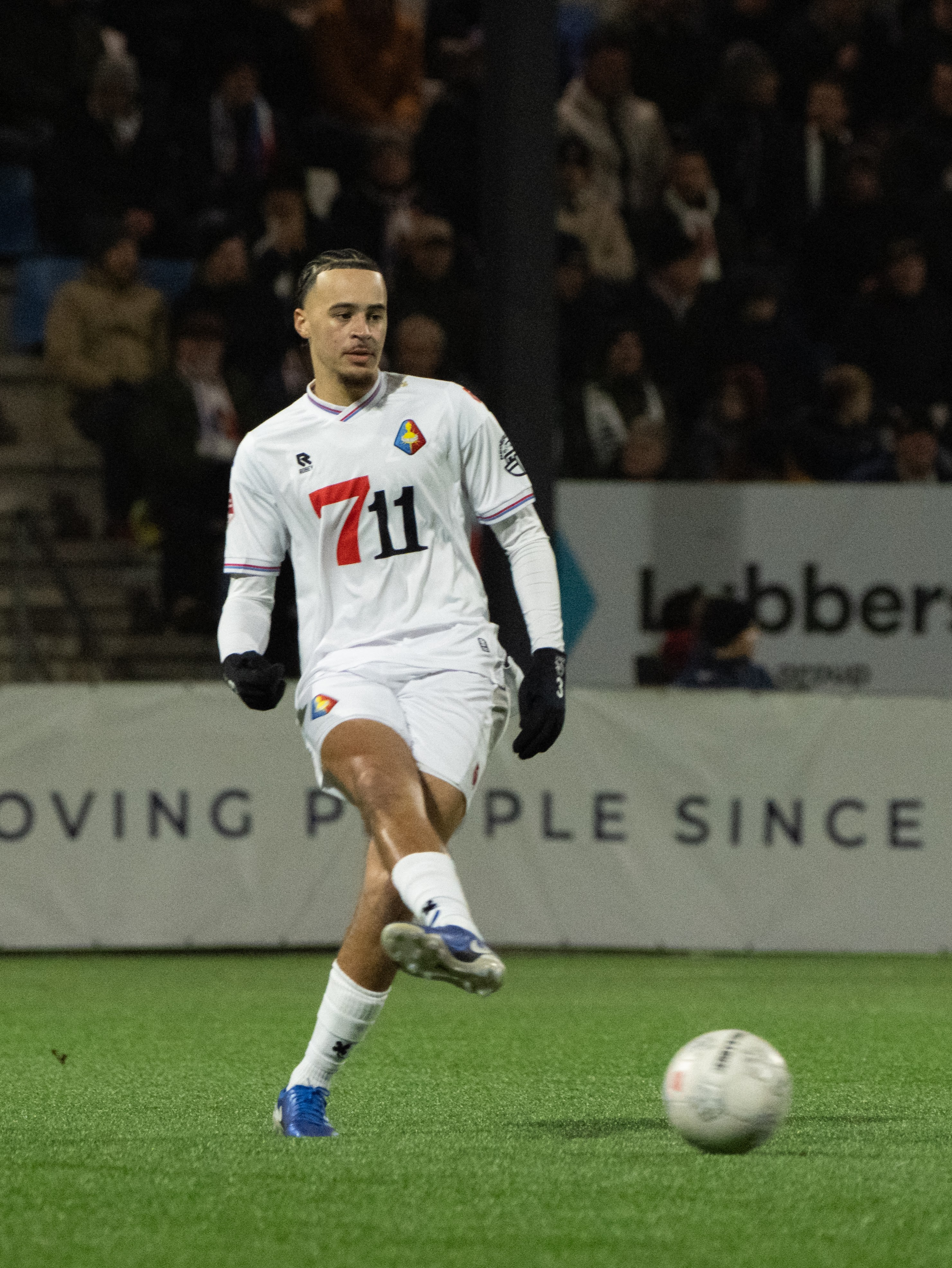
- Koswal with Telstar in 2024

Personal information
- Date of birth: 21 August 2003 (age 23)
- Place of birth: Rotterdam, Netherlands
- Height: 1.93 m (6 ft 4 in)
- Position: Centre-back

Team information
- Current team: Sandefjord

Youth career
- –2010: Alexandria '66
- 2010–2011: Spartaan '20
- 2011–2012: Excelsior
- 2012–2019: Spartaan '20
- 2019–2020: Dordrecht

Senior career*
Years	Team	Apps	(Gls)
2021–2023	Dordrecht	23	(0)
2023–2026	Telstar	78	(1)
2026–	Sandefjord	0	(0)
- * Club domestic league appearances and goals as of 21:28, 17 May 2026 (UTC)

Devon Koswal (born 21 August 2003) is a professional footballer who plays as a defender for Eliteserien club Sandefjord.

== Career ==
=== Dordrecht ===
Koswal came through the ranks at VV Alexandria, Spartaan '20, SBV Excelsior and FC Dordrecht, and made his debut for the senior team, coming on as a substitute for Kürşad Sürmeli in a 1–0 victory over NAC Breda. He made his full debut in a 3–0 defeat to Almere City. However, he would struggle with injuries the following years, limiting his playing time for the first team.

=== Telstar ===
In August 2023, Koswal joined Eerste Divisie club Telstar on an amateur contract. He made his debut for the club on 28 August, coming on as a late substitute in a 3–1 league defeat to Jong AZ. On 15 April 2024, Koswal signed his first professional contract with Telstar, a one-year deal with an option for a further season.

During the 2024–25 season, he established himself as a regular starter and played an important role in Telstar's defensive setup. On 27 March 2025, the club exercised the option in his deal, extending his contract to 2026. Koswal featured in all six matches of the promotion play-offs and provided an assist in the 3–1 second-leg win over Willem II that secured Telstar's first promotion to the Eredivisie in 47 years.

Koswal made his Eredivisie debut on 10 August 2025, starting in a 2–0 away defeat to Ajax at the Johan Cruyff Arena.

=== Sandefjord ===
On 19 June 2026, Koswal signed for Norwegian Eliteserien club Sandefjord on a contract until December 2029.

== Personal life ==
Born in the Netherlands, Koswal is of Surinamese descent.

== Career statistics ==
As of match played 17 May 2026

Appearances and goals by club, season and competition
Club	Season	League			KNVB Cup		Other		Total	
Club	Season	Division	Apps	Goals	Apps	Goals	Apps	Goals	Apps	Goals
Dordrecht	2020–21	Eerste Divisie	14	0	0	0	—		14	0
Dordrecht	2021–22	Eerste Divisie	5	0	0	0	—		5	0
Dordrecht	2022–23	Eerste Divisie	4	0	0	0	—		4	0
Dordrecht	Total		23	0	0	0	—		23	0
Telstar	2023–24	Eerste Divisie	25	1	1	0	—		26	1
Telstar	2024–25	Eerste Divisie	28	0	1	0	6 (Note: Appearances in Eredivisie promotion/relegation playoffs)	0	35	0
Telstar	2025–26	Eredivisie	25	0	2	0	—		27	0
Telstar	Total		78	1	4	0	6	0	88	1
Sandefjord	2026	Eliteserien	0	0	0	0	—		0	0
Career total			101	1	4	0	6	0	111	1
