= Guus Offerhaus =

Dutch footballer (born 2001)

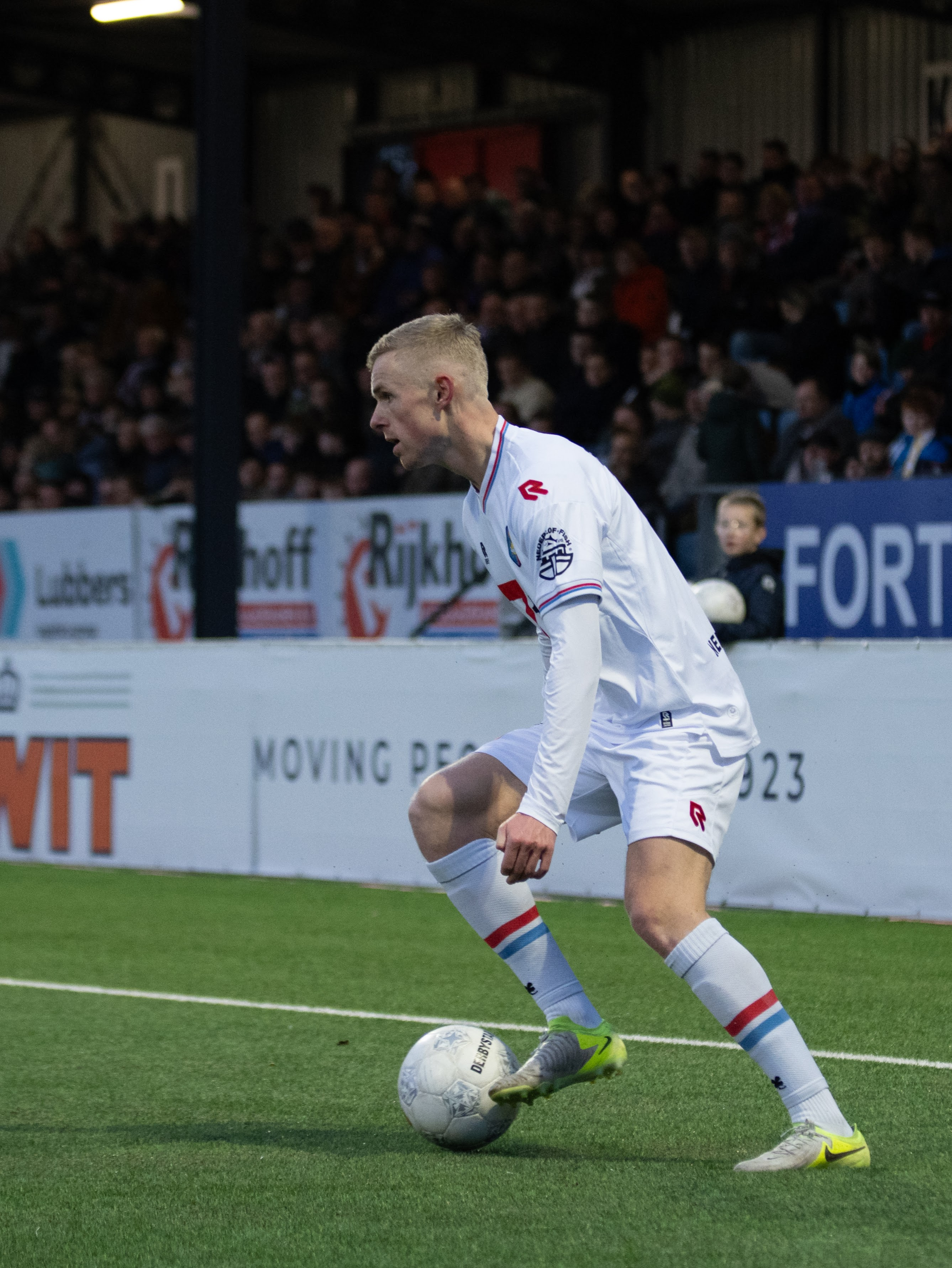
- Offerhaus with Telstar in 2025

Personal information
- Date of birth: 3 January 2001 (age 25)
- Place of birth: Heerhugowaard, Netherlands
- Height: 1.88 m (6 ft 2 in)
- Position: Centre-back

Team information
- Current team: Utrecht
- Number: 6

Youth career
- –2012: MOC
- 2012–2017: HVV Hollandia
- 2017–2020: Heerenveen
- 2021–2022: Emmen

Senior career*
Years	Team	Apps	(Gls)
2022–2023	Koninklijke HFC	34	(0)
2023–2024	Quick Boys	34	(1)
2024–2026	Telstar	69	(2)
2026–	Utrecht	5	(0)
- * Club domestic league appearances and goals as of 20:44, 5 September 2026 (UTC)

Guus Offerhaus (born 3 January 2001) is a professional footballer who plays as a centre-back for Eredivisie club Utrecht.

== Career ==
=== Koninklijke HFC ===
Offerhaus began his football career in the youth academies of MOC, HVV Hollandia, Heerenveen, and Emmen, before joining Koninklijke HFC. He made his senior debut on the opening matchday of the 2022–23 Tweede Divisie season, starting in a 1–0 home victory against Spakenburg. He was a regular starter that season, playing every match and missing only nine minutes of play, as Koninklijke HFC finished seventh, slightly above mid-table.

=== Quick Boys ===
On 16 November 2022, Offerhaus signed with fellow Tweede Divisie club Quick Boys, set to join them at the start of the 2023–24 season. Offerhaus made his debut for Quick Boys on 19 August 2023, in the season's opening match, starting in a 3–1 away victory over De Treffers. He was a consistent presence in the lineup throughout the season, starting in every match except one.

=== Telstar ===
Despite initially extending his contract with Quick Boys, Offerhaus signed his first professional contract with Eerste Divisie club Telstar on 21 May 2024. He made his professional debut for the club on 9 August 2024, in a 3–2 away victory against recently relegated Vitesse. Starting the match, he played the full 90 minutes and contributed two assists. He quickly established himself as a regular starter under head coach Anthony Correia.

Telstar entered the final round of the regular season with a place in the promotion play-offs at stake, facing Emmen in a direct contest for qualification. Telstar won 3–0, with Offerhaus scoring his first professional goal. He featured in all of the club's subsequent play-off matches, including a 2–2 draw and 3–1 victory over Willem II in the final round, which secured Telstar's promotion to the Eredivisie for the first time in 47 years.

Offerhaus made his Eredivisie debut on 10 August 2025, starting in a 2–0 defeat away to Ajax at the Johan Cruyff Arena.

=== Utrecht ===
On 5 June 2026, Offerhaus signed a three-year contract with Eredivisie club FC Utrecht, effective from 1 July, reuniting him with his Telstar coach Anthony Correia, who had joined Utrecht the same summer.

== Personal life ==
Offerhaus was born in Heerhugowaard but grew up in Midwoud. Outside of football, he previously worked as a project coordinator at a construction company. He left this job in 2024 to fully focus on his professional football career with Telstar, stating, "Working can always come later; being involved with football every day is the most rewarding thing."

== Career statistics ==
As of match played 5 September 2026

Appearances and goals by club, season and competition
Club	Season	League			KNVB Cup		Other		Total	
Club	Season	Division	Apps	Goals	Apps	Goals	Apps	Goals	Apps	Goals
Koninklijke HFC	2022–23	Tweede Divisie	34	0	1	0	—		35	0
Quick Boys	2023–24	Tweede Divisie	34	1	4	0	—		38	1
Telstar	2024–25	Eerste Divisie	36	1	2	0	6 (Note: Appearances in Eredivisie promotion/relegation playoffs)	0	43	1
Telstar	2025–26	Eredivisie	33	1	5	2	—		38	4
Telstar	Total		69	2	7	2	6	0	82	4
Utrecht	2026–27	Eredivisie	5	0	0	0	—		5	0
Career total			142	3	12	2	6	0	160	5
