= Henk Brugge =

Dutch football manager (born 1977)

- Brugge in 2026

Personal information
- Date of birth: 31 July 1977 (age 49)
- Place of birth: Haarlem, Netherlands
- Position: Defender

Team information
- Current team: Telstar (head coach)

Senior career*
Years	Team	Apps	(Gls)
- Flevo Boys

Managerial career
- 2025: Heerenveen (interim)
- 2026–: Telstar
- * Club domestic league appearances and goals

Henk Brugge (born 31 July 1977) is a Dutch professional football manager who is the head coach of Eredivisie club Telstar.

Brugge never played professional football. He worked as a schoolteacher and played as an amateur defender for Flevo Boys in the Noordoostpolder, where he began coaching in 2008. After twelve years in the youth academy of PEC Zwolle and a season in charge of the under-18 side at Feyenoord, he joined Heerenveen as an assistant coach in 2023, combining the role with positions on the staff of several Netherlands youth national teams.

He took temporary charge of Heerenveen in February 2025 after Robin van Persie left for Feyenoord. Lacking the coaching qualifications to be appointed permanently, he was limited to three matches before Robin Veldman took over. Brugge completed the UEFA Pro Licence in 2026 and was appointed head coach of Telstar on 18 May 2026, succeeding Anthony Correia.

== Early life and teaching career ==
Brugge was born in Haarlem on 31 July 1977 and grew up in Emmeloord, in the Noordoostpolder in Flevoland. He worked as a teacher, first in special-needs primary education and later in pre-vocational secondary education (vmbo), teaching pupils who received additional learning support.

As a player he was a defender and captain for the amateur club Flevo Boys in the Noordoostpolder, and never appeared in professional football.

== Coaching career ==
=== Flevo Boys and PEC Zwolle ===
Brugge began coaching at Flevo Boys in 2008, taking charge of the club's under-19 team. Two years later he joined the youth academy of PEC Zwolle, where he remained for twelve years. He coached several age groups at the club, including the under-18 side, and spent a period as head of the academy. In 2011 he briefly combined his work in Zwolle with a role as assistant coach at the Frisian amateur club Drachtster Boys.

=== Netherlands youth teams ===
Brugge has held a number of positions with the Royal Dutch Football Association (KNVB) as an assistant to Dutch youth national sides, including the under-17, under-18, under-19 and under-20 teams. He assisted Mischa Visser with the under-19 team in the 2023–24 season, alongside Ibrahim Afellay, and Adil Ramzi with the under-18 team in 2024–25, alongside Nicky Kuiper. With the under-17 team, he won a European title and a achieved a fourth-place finish at a World Cup.

=== Feyenoord ===
In the summer of 2022, Brugge left PEC Zwolle for Feyenoord, where he took charge of the under-18 team. He departed after one season and was succeeded in the role by Robin van Persie, who would later become his superior at Heerenveen.

=== Heerenveen ===
==== Assistant coach ====
Brugge joined SC Heerenveen as assistant coach in the summer of 2023, working under Kees van Wonderen. He remained on the technical staff when Van Wonderen left and Van Persie was appointed head coach.

==== Interim spell ====
On 23 February 2025, with eleven league fixtures of the season remaining, Van Persie left Heerenveen for Feyenoord, taking with him assistant Brian Pinas, video analyst Yöri Bosschaart and goalkeeping coach Frans Hoek. At the board's request, Brugge assumed the head coach's duties on an interim basis.

His first match in charge was at home to AZ on 2 March 2025. Heerenveen, who had lost 9–1 to the same opponents earlier in the season, won 3–1. The Heerenveen players celebrated at length afterwards and formed a guard of honour for Brugge. The scenes were widely discussed in the Dutch football media, where they were nicknamed a "liberation party"; pundits including Wesley Sneijder and Kenneth Perez read them as a rebuke of the departed Van Persie, an interpretation Brugge rejected. He later said the affair had left him with some unpleasant feelings.

Heerenveen lost Brugge's second match 2–1 away to PSV on 8 March, a result that denied him the distinction of becoming the first Heerenveen manager to win his opening two games. His third and final match in charge, at home to Heracles Almelo on 15 March, ended 1–1.

Brugge did not hold the coaching qualifications required for a permanent appointment, and under the rules of the Dutch licencing committee could sit on the bench as head coach for no more than three league matches, obliging the club to find a replacement within the month. Heerenveen approached several candidates without success; the Leeuwarder Courant reported that Alex Pastoor, Giovanni van Bronckhorst and René Hake had all turned the club down. Robin Veldman was appointed head coach on 21 March 2025.

==== Return to the staff and qualification ====
Brugge extended his contract with Heerenveen in June 2025 and continued as an assistant. In the same year he was admitted to the KNVB's professional coaching course, Voetbalcoach 5, which leads to the UEFA Pro Licence; he completed the qualification in 2026.

=== Telstar ===
Brugge was presented as head coach of Telstar on 18 May 2026, on a two-year contract with an option for a third season. He succeeded Anthony Correia, who had taken the club into the Eredivisie in 2025 and was leaving for FC Utrecht. Telstar had confirmed their survival the day before the announcement, beating Volendam 2–1 away to finish the 2025–26 season 14th with 37 points, five clear of the relegation play-off places.

Technical manager Peter Hofstede said the club had chosen Brugge because his view of the game matched its intention to play attacking, recognisable football and to develop players within a defined style. The appointment was Brugge's first permanent post as head coach of a professional club. Because he was still contracted to Heerenveen for a further season, Telstar were reported to have paid a fee to release him.

Brugge said he expected a harder second season, because opponents would now prepare for Telstar rather than be surprised by them, something he had seen Heerenveen begin to do in the second half of the previous campaign. The club lost six regular starters as well as Correia over the summer and again set survival as its objective. Telstar began the 2026–27 season with a 2–1 win away to NEC on 8 August 2026, but took only one point from their next four matches.

== Coaching style ==
Brugge's background in the academies of PEC Zwolle and Feyenoord has been associated with an emphasis on player development and technical football. A 2026 profile described him as favouring a 4–3–3 formation with an attacking midfielder. On his appointment at Telstar he said he intended to build on the attacking football that had brought the club praise under Correia.

== Managerial statistics ==
As of match played 21 November 2026

Managerial record by team and tenure
Team	From	To	Record								Ref.
Team	From	To	G	W	D	L	GF	GA	GD	Win %	Ref.
Heerenveen (interim)	23 February 2025	20 March 2025	3	1	1	1	5	4	+1	33.33	
Telstar	1 July 2026	Present	14	2	4	8	19	30	−11	14.29	
Career Total			17	3	5	9	24	34	−10	17.65	
