= Adil Lechkar =

Dutch footballer (born 2001)

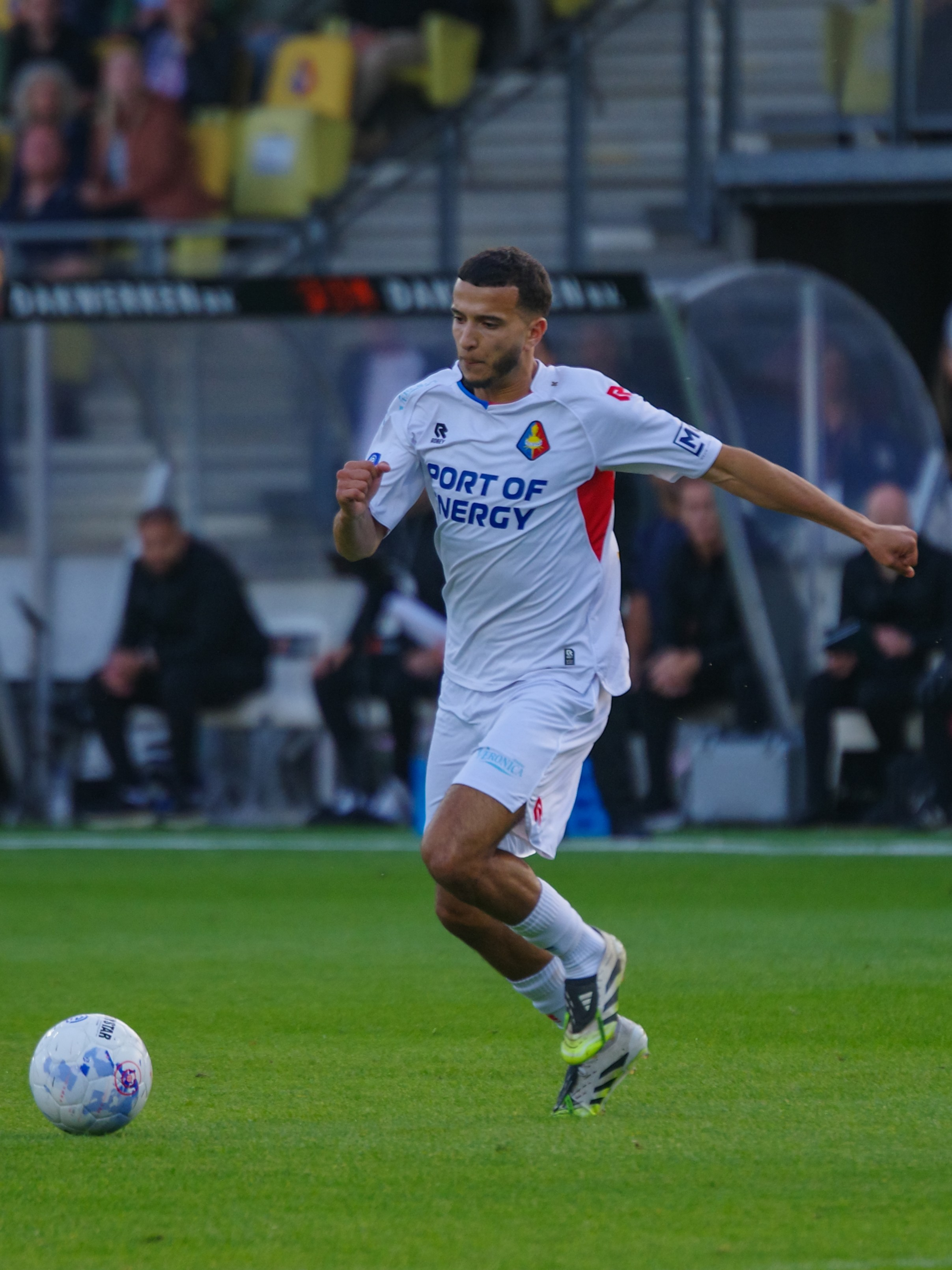
- Lechkar with Telstar in 2025

Personal information
- Date of birth: 2 September 2001 (age 25)
- Place of birth: Amsterdam, Netherlands
- Height: 1.71 m (5 ft 7 in)
- Positions: Right-back; right midfielder

Team information
- Current team: Dordrecht
- Number: 2

Youth career
- –2014: AFC
- 2014–2017: Almere City
- 2017–2018: DWS
- 2018–2019: Argon

Senior career*
Years	Team	Apps	(Gls)
2019–2022	Argon		
2022–2023	FC Aalsmeer		
2023–2024	TEC	34	(4)
2024–2026	Telstar	26	(0)
2026–	Dordrecht	8	(0)
- * Club domestic league appearances and goals as of 3 October 2026

Adil Lechkar (born 2 September 2001) is a Dutch professional footballer who plays as a right-back or right midfielder for Eerste Divisie club Dordrecht.

== Career ==
=== Early years ===
Lechkar came through the youth systems of AFC and Almere City, where he was converted from a midfielder to a left-back. He made his senior debut with Argon in the Eerste Klasse, joined FC Aalsmeer for the 2022–23 season in the Tweede Klasse, and moved to TEC in the Derde Divisie for the 2023–24 season. He made his competitive debut on 12 August 2023, starting in TEC's KNVB Cup preliminary-round tie against DOVO, which TEC won on penalties. He started again on his league debut eight days later, a 2–0 home defeat to Gemert on the opening matchday. He scored his first goal for the club in the reverse fixture on 14 January 2024, a 4–0 away win. He scored four goals in 39 appearances in his only season with TEC, helping the club reach the promotion play-offs for the Tweede Divisie. TEC were eliminated by SC Genemuiden over two legs, with Lechkar starting both matches.

=== Telstar ===
In May 2024, Lechkar signed for Telstar of the second-tier Eerste Divisie. He made his professional debut on 9 August 2024 in a 3–2 victory against Vitesse, coming on in the 65th minute for Cain Seedorf. During the season, he made twelve substitute appearances, including one in the promotion play-offs, as Telstar won promotion to the Eredivisie via the play-offs for the first time in 47 years.

He made his Eredivisie debut on 10 August 2025, replacing Jeff Hardeveld in the 75th minute of a 2–0 away defeat to Ajax at the Johan Cruyff Arena. He left Telstar at the end of the season.

=== Dordrecht ===
On 19 July 2026, Lechkar signed a two-season contract with Dordrecht in Eerste Divisie.

== Personal life ==
Lechkar's brother, Hachim Lechkar, is also a footballer, active mainly in amateur football.
