= Makan Aïko =

French footballer (born 2000)

- Aïko with Motor Lublin in 2026

Personal information
- Date of birth: 7 January 2001 (age 25)
- Place of birth: Paris, France
- Height: 1.80 m (5 ft 11 in)
- Positions: Winger; forward

Team information
- Current team: Motor Lublin
- Number: 70

Youth career
- 2006–2014: AS Le Mans Villaret
- 2014–2019: Le Mans

Senior career*
| Years | Team | Apps | (Gls) |
| 2019–2024 | Le Mans | 55 | (7) |
| 2019–2021 | Le Mans B | 12 | (1) |
| 2024–2025 | Fortuna Sittard | 35 | (3) |
| 2026 | Tondela | 18 | (1) |
| 2026– | Motor Lublin | 11 | (2) |
- * Club domestic league appearances and goals as of 18 October 2026

Makan Aïko (born 7 July 2001) is a French professional footballer who plays as a winger or forward for Ekstraklasa club Motor Lublin.

== Early life ==
Aïko was born in Paris and grew up in Le Mans. He is of Ivorian descent.

== Club career ==
=== Le Mans ===
Aïko began playing football with AS Le Mans Villaret before joining the Le Mans FC academy in 2014. He made his first-team debut on 15 January 2021 in a 2–0 Championnat National defeat away to Quevilly-Rouen. He scored his first senior goal on 6 August 2021, deciding a 1–0 home win over Stade Briochin. In April 2024, he was shortlisted for the Championnat National Revelation of the Season award.

=== Fortuna Sittard ===
After his contract expired in the summer of 2024, Aïko joined Dutfch Eredivisie club Fortuna Sittard on a free transfer, signing a two-year deal with an option for a further year. He made his debut for the club on 11 August 2024, scoring in a 2–0 league win away to Go Ahead Eagles; Alen Halilović opened the scoring before Aïko added the second from a Mitchell Dijks assist. He finished the 2024–25 season with 22 Eredivisie appearances and one goal; across all competitions he made 23 appearances.

On 14 September 2025, Aïko came on as a substitute to score twice late on in a 3–1 league win away to Telstar.

=== Tondela ===
On 9 January 2026, Aïko moved to Portugal, joining Primeira Liga club Tondela on a contract until June 2028.

=== Motor Lublin ===
On 7 July 2026, Aïko joined Polish Ekstraklasa club Motor Lublin on a two-year deal.

== Style of play ==
A versatile midfielder who has also been used in advanced roles, Aïko has been described as "fast, explosive, hard-hitting and technical".
