= Patrick Brouwer =

Dutch footballer (born 2001)

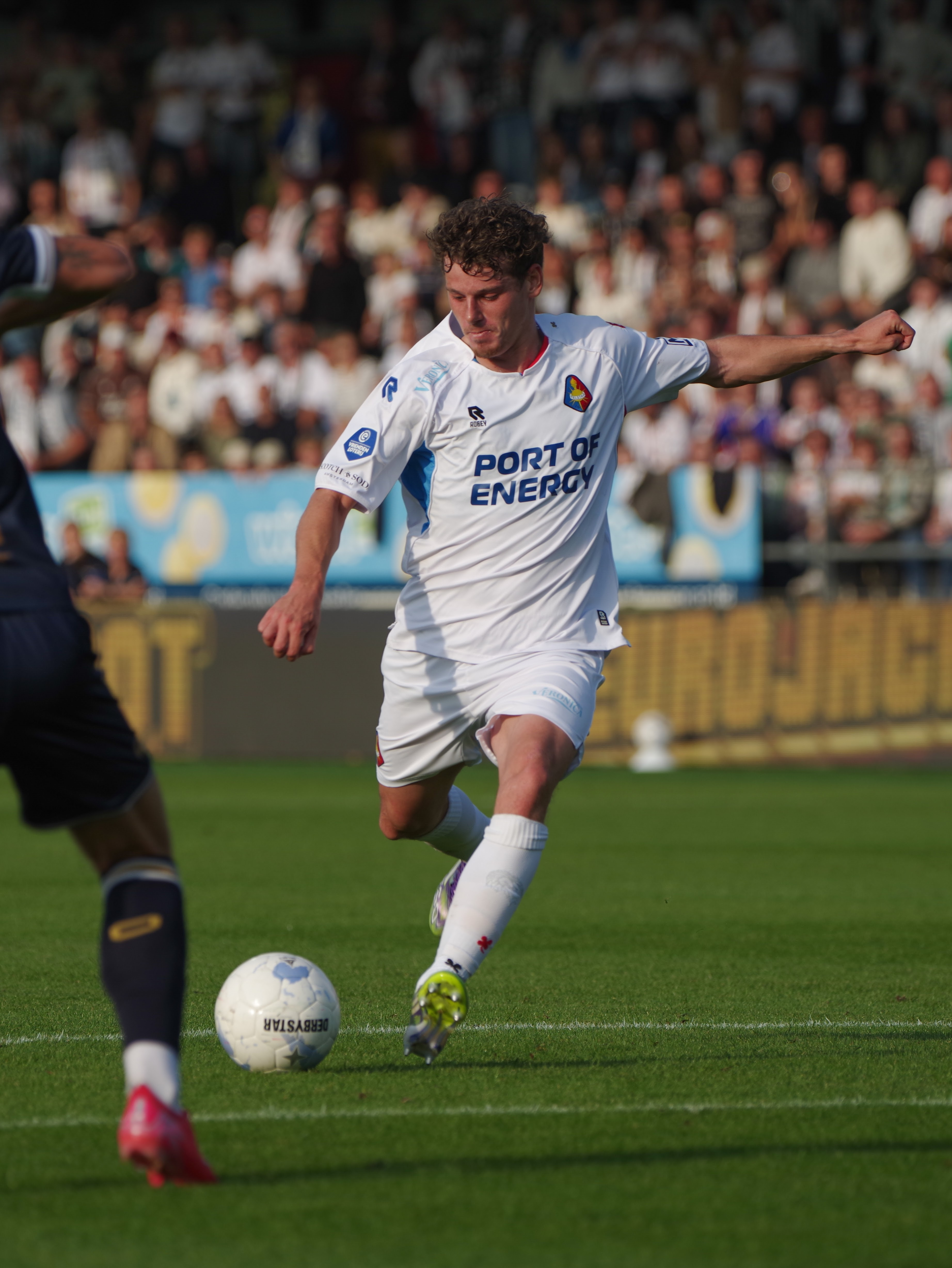
- Brouwer in 2025

Personal information
- Date of birth: 19 March 2001 (age 25)
- Place of birth: Leiden, Netherlands
- Height: 1.76 m (5 ft 9 in)
- Positions: Forward; attacking midfielder

Team information
- Current team: Telstar
- Number: 27

Youth career
- 2013–2017: Alphense Boys
- 2017–2022: Sparta Rotterdam

Senior career*
Years	Team	Apps	(Gls)
2020–2023	Jong Sparta	53	(9)
2022–2024	Sparta	2	(0)
2023–2024	→ Emmen (loan)	32	(4)
2024–2025	Quick Boys	32	(16)
2025–	Telstar	38	(8)
- * Club domestic league appearances and goals as of 12:26, 14 October 2026 (UTC)

Patrick Brouwer (born 19 March 2001) is a Dutch professional footballer who plays as a forward for Eredivisie club Telstar.

== Career ==
=== Early years ===
Brouwer was raised in Leiden, South Holland. Aged twelve, he joined the youth system of Alphense Boys and, after one season, moved to Sparta Rotterdam, where he was initially used as a central midfielder before being converted into a wide forward. He made his professional debut for Sparta during the 2022–23 season, and spent 2023–24 on loan at FC Emmen, where injuries in the squad also saw him deployed at right-back; he scored four goals in 32 appearances in all competitions. He subsequently signed for Quick Boys in the Tweede Divisie, finishing as the club's top scorer in the 2024–25 season, as the club won the league title.

=== Telstar ===
In June 2025, Brouwer joined Telstar on a three-year contract following the club's promotion to the Eredivisie. He made his league debut on 10 August 2025 in a 2–0 away defeat to Ajax, Telstar's first Eredivisie match since 1978; Brouwer went close early on, striking the post. He scored his first Eredivisie goal on 23 August, netting Telstar's second in a 2–2 draw with FC Volendam. A week later, he again scored the second goal as Telstar recorded a 2–0 away win over PSV, a result widely described as a major upset.

== Career statistics ==
As of match played 11 October 2026

Appearances and goals by club, season and competition
Club	Season	League			KNVB Cup		Other		Total	
Club	Season	Division	Apps	Goals	Apps	Goals	Apps	Goals	Apps	Goals
Jong Sparta	2019–20	Tweede Divisie	1	0	—		—		1	0
Jong Sparta	2019–20	Tweede Divisie	5	0	—		—		5	0
Jong Sparta	2019–20	Tweede Divisie	32	6	—		—		32	6
Jong Sparta	2019–20	Tweede Divisie	15	3	—		—		15	3
Jong Sparta	Total		53	9	—		—		53	9
Sparta Rotterdam	2022–23	Eredivisie	2	0	1	0	—		3	0
Emmen (loan)	2023–24	Eerste Divisie	32	4	1	0	4 (Note: Appearance(s) in Eredivisie promotion/relegation playoffs)	0	37	4
Quick Boys	2024–25	Tweede Divisie	32	16	4	1	—		36	17
Telstar	2025–26	Eredivisie	30	7	3	2	—		33	9
Telstar	2026–27	Eredivisie	8	1	0	0	—		8	1
Telstar	Total		38	8	3	2	—		41	10
Career total			157	37	9	3	4	0	170	40

== Honours ==
Quick Boys

- Tweede Divisie: 2024–25
