= Soufiane Hetli =

Dutch footballer (born 2001)

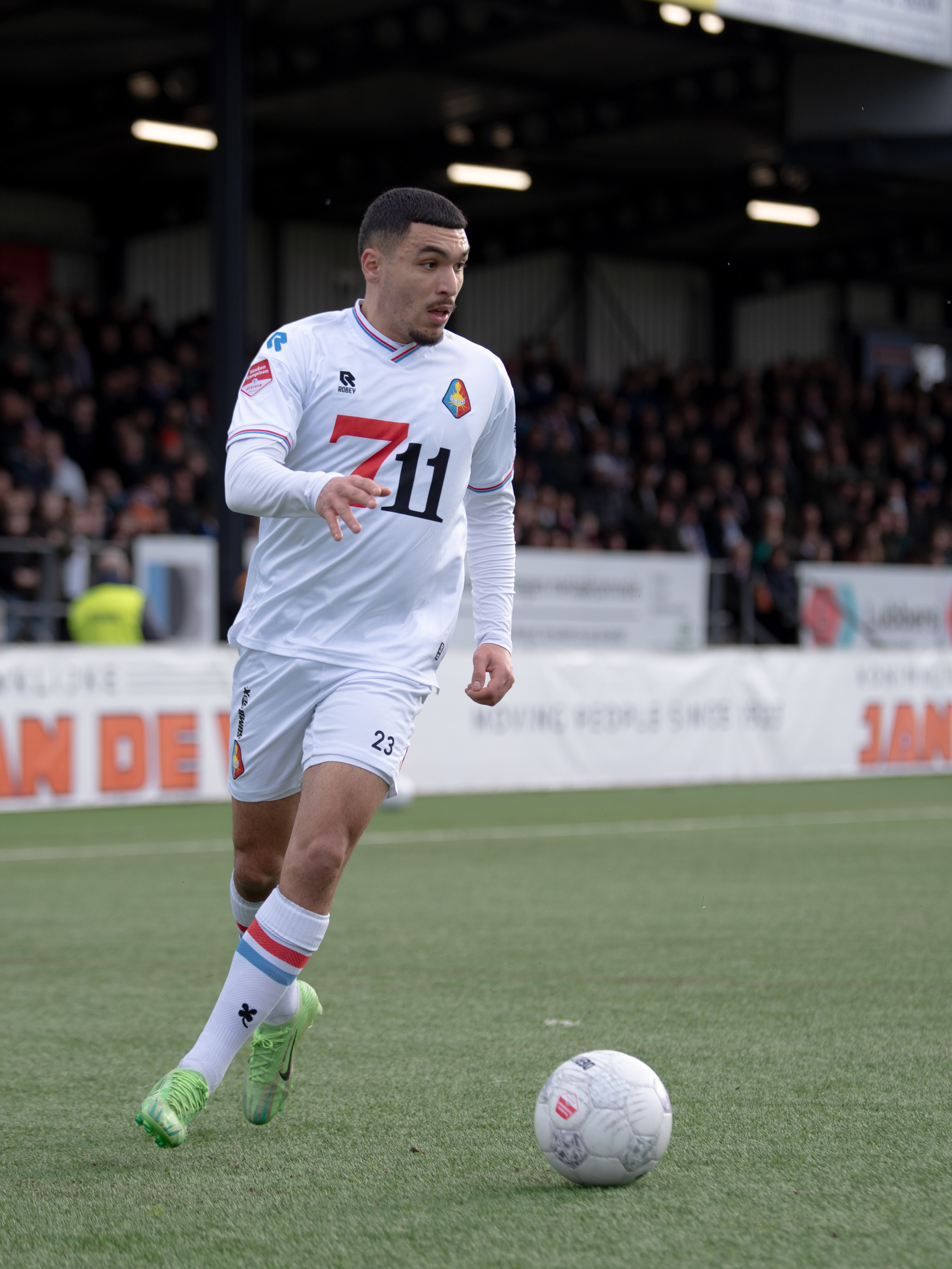
- Hetli with Telstar in 2025

Personal information
- Date of birth: 30 May 2001 (age 25)
- Place of birth: Amsterdam, Netherlands
- Height: 1.86 m (6 ft 1 in)
- Position: Forward

Team information
- Current team: Wydad

Youth career
- –2015: Zeeburgia
- 2015–2017: Almere City
- 2017–2018: DWS
- 2019–2022: AFC

Senior career*
Years	Team	Apps	(Gls)
2022–2024	AFC	40	(12)
2024–2026	Telstar	66	(9)
2026–	Wydad	0	(0)
- * Club domestic league appearances and goals as of 14:20, 5 September 2026 (UTC)

Soufiane Hetli (born 30 May 2001) is a Dutch professional footballer who plays as a forward for Botola Pro club Wydad Casablanca. Born in Amsterdam, he came through the academy at AFC and holds Dutch and Moroccan nationality.

== Career ==
=== AFC ===
A product of AFC's youth system, Hetli was promoted to the first team in 2022 and made his senior debut on 20 August 2022, coming on as a substitute in a 2–1 away defeat to De Treffers in the Tweede Divisie. He became a regular during the 2023–24 season, scoring ten league goals as AFC finished fifth.

=== Telstar ===
On 30 May 2024, Hetli signed his first professional contract with Telstar of the Eerste Divisie, a one-year deal with an option for a further year. On 9 August 2024, he made his professional debut in a 3–2 away win over Vitesse. On 9 February 2025, he scored his first professional goal in a 6–0 victory against Jong FC Utrecht.

Telstar exercised the option in his deal in March 2025, and on 17 April 2025 he extended his contract to the summer of 2027. In the final match of the regular season, a 3–0 win over Emmen on 9 May 2025, Hetli sustained a broken rib, which ruled him out of the promotion play-offs. Telstar nevertheless secured promotion to the Eredivisie for the first time since 1978 after defeating Willem II in the play-off final.

Hetli made his Eredivisie debut on 10 August 2025, starting in a 2–0 defeat away to Ajax. On 23 August he scored his first Eredivisie goal, opening the scoring in the 41st minute of a 2–2 home draw with Volendam. He made 31 appearances across the season, scoring three times and providing one assist, as Telstar avoided relegation. Hetli later said that he had seldom started in the second half of that season and had felt passed over.

=== Wydad ===
On 29 August 2026, Hetli joined Botola Pro club Wydad for a reported fee of €250,000. He left Telstar having made 71 appearances, scoring ten goals and providing five assists. At Wydad he became a team-mate of Hakim Ziyech. Hetli said that he had been willing to leave Telstar only if both the sporting and the financial terms were right, and that the offer meant his mother could stop working. He added that the prospect of playing alongside Ziyech had not been decisive in his choice.

== Style of play ==
Hetli has been deployed as a centre-forward and on the right wing. Regional coverage has described him as a right-sided attacker capable of striking eye-catching goals.

== Career statistics ==
As of match played 14 August 2026

Appearances and goals by club, season and competition
Club	Season	League			KNVB Cup		Other		Total	
Club	Season	Division	Apps	Goals	Apps	Goals	Apps	Goals	Apps	Goals
AFC	2022–23	Tweede Divisie	20	2	0	0	—		20	2
AFC	2023–24	Tweede Divisie	20	10	2	0	—		22	10
AFC	Total		40	12	2	0	—		42	12
Telstar	2024–25	Eerste Divisie	33	6	2	0	0	0	35	6
Telstar	2025–26	Eredivisie	31	3	3	1	—		34	4
Telstar	2026–27	Eredivisie	2	0	0	0	—		2	0
Telstar	Total		66	9	5	1	0	0	71	10
Wydad	2026–27	Botola Pro	0	0	0	0	0	0	0	0
Career total			86	21	7	1	0	0	93	22
