= Velsen-Zuid =

- Village
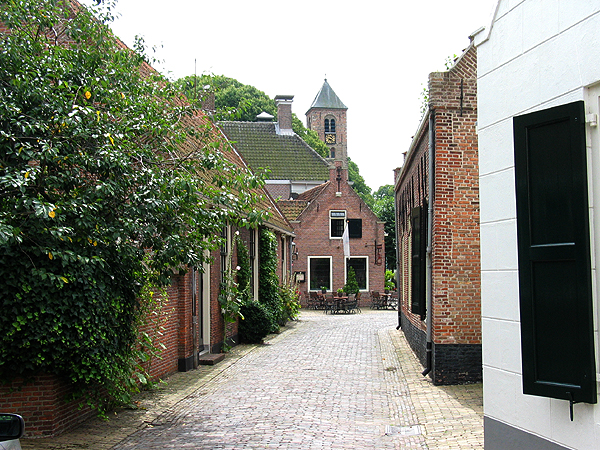
- Historical street with church tower

- Location in the Netherlands Location in the province of North Holland in the Netherlands
- Coordinates: 52°27′36″N 4°39′1″E
- Country: Netherlands
- Province: North Holland
- Municipality: Velsen

Area
  - Total: 2.28 km^{2} (0.88 sq mi)
- Elevation: 1.7 m (5.6 ft)

Population (2021)
  - Total: 3,910
  - Density: 1,710/km^{2} (4,440/sq mi)
- Time zone: UTC+1 (CET)
  - Summer (DST): UTC+2 (CEST)
- Postal code: 1981
- Dialing code: 0255

Velsen-Zuid (Dutch pronunciation: [ˌvɛlzə(n) ˈzœyt]) is a town in the Dutch province of North Holland. It is a part of the municipality of Velsen, and lies about 9 km north of Haarlem.

Velsen-Zuid developed around the church founded by Willibrord in the 8th century. Between 1865 and 1876, the North Sea Canal was dug and Velsen became two settlements.

The home of Telstar, a team competing in the first tier of Dutch football, the Eredivisie, is located in Velsen-Zuid. Their stadium is known as the 711 Stadion.
