= Anthony Correia (footballer, born 1982) =

Dutch football manager (born 1982)

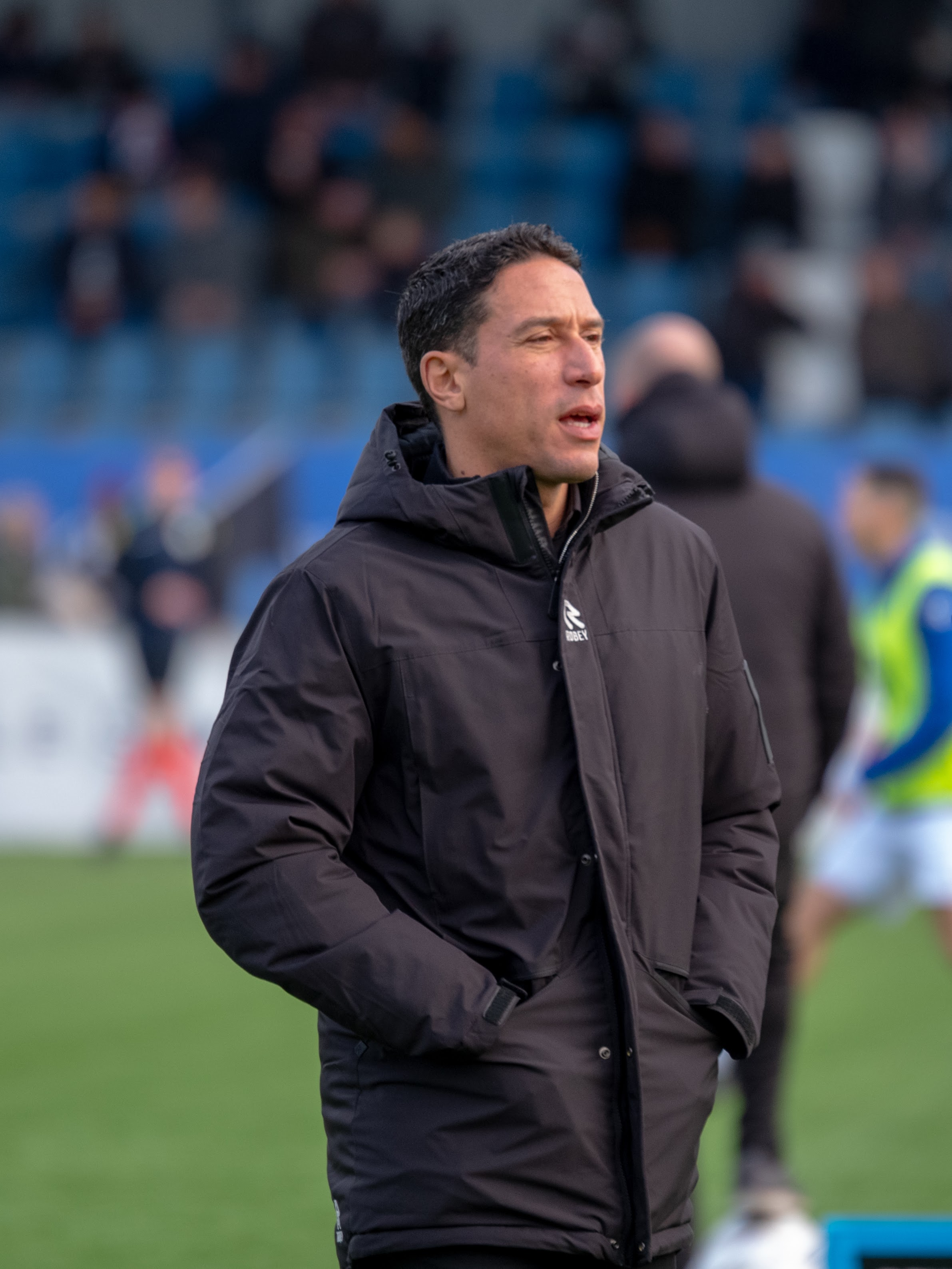
- Correia managing Telstar in 2025

Personal information
- Date of birth: 2 May 1982 (age 44)
- Place of birth: Paramaribo, Suriname
- Height: 1.79 m (5 ft 10 in)
- Position: Right-back

Youth career
- Onze Gezellen
- RKVV Velsen

Senior career*
| Years | Team | Apps | (Gls) |
| 2001–2016 | Telstar | 351 | (1) |

Managerial career
- 2014–2016: Velserbroek
- 2016–2019: IJmuiden
- 2019–2020: ODIN '59
- 2020–2024: Katwijk
- 2024–2026: Telstar
- 2026: Utrecht
- * Club domestic league appearances and goals

Anthony Correia (born 2 May 1982) is a Dutch professional football manager and former player who most recently was the head coach of Eredivisie club Utrecht.

A right-back during his playing career, Correia spent his entire professional career with Telstar, making him a one-club man.

== Football career ==
Between 2001 and 2016, he made more than 350 appearances for Telstar in the Dutch Eerste Divisie. He played his final match as a professional in April 2016 against Helmond Sport.

In 2017, Correia became an assistant coach of Telstar, being successively awarded with a contract extension in February 2022. Alongside, Correa coached ODIN '59 (2019–20) and VV Katwijk (2020–24). As Katwijk head coach, Correia also won the 2021–22 Tweede Divisie title.

In April 2024, Telstar announced Correia would serve as the club's new head coach on a two-year deal, effective from the 2024–25 season. During his first season in charge as a head coach, Correia guided Telstar to seventh place in the regular season and, eventually, to win the promotion/relegation play-offs, defeating Eredivisie side Willem II in a two-legged final, leading his club back to the Dutch top flight for the first time in 47 years.

On 13 April 2026, it was announced that Correia would be joining Utrecht at the end of the season, on a three-year deal. After a dreadful start of the 2026-27 Eredivisie season, Correia was sacked on 22 November 2026.

== Honours ==
=== Managerial ===
Katwijk

- Tweede Divisie: 2021–22

Telstar

- Eredivisie promotion/relegation playoffs: 2025

== See also ==
- List of one-club men
