= Saeid Janfada =

Iranian footballer

Saeed Janfada
Personal information
- Full name: Saeed Janfada
- Date of birth: 21 March 1964 (age 62)
- Place of birth: Tehran, Iran
- Height: 1.77 m (5 ft 10 in)
- Position: Centre-back

Senior career*
Years	Team	Apps	(Gls)
–1986	PAS Tehran		
1986–1988	Esteghlal		
1990–1994	VVV-Venlo	81	(2)
1994–1995	FC Eindhoven	29	(0)
1995–1996	RFC Roermond		

International career^{‡}
1987–1988	Iran	2	(0)
- * Club domestic league appearances and goals as of 19 May 2019 ‡ National team caps and goals as of 1 January 2008

Saeed Janfada (Persian: سعید جان‌فدا, born 21 March 1964) is a retired Iranian football defender who played for Esteghlal, VVV-Venlo and the Iran national football team.

Janfada competed for Iran at the 1988 AFC Asian Cup.

== Career statistics ==
As of 10 June 2019

Club	Division	Season	League		Cup		Other		Total	
Club	Division	Season	Apps	Goals	Apps	Goals	Apps	Goals	Apps	Goals
VVV-Venlo	Eerste Divisie	1990–91	19	0	2	0	4	0	25	0
VVV-Venlo	Eredivisie	1991–92	6	0	2	0	—		8	0
VVV-Venlo	Eerste Divisie	1992–93	25	1	2	1	—		27	2
VVV-Venlo	Eredivisie	1993–94	31	1	2	0	6	0	39	1
VVV-Venlo	Eerste Divisie	1994–95	0	0	1	0	—		1	0
VVV-Venlo	Total		81	2	9	1	10	0	100	3
FC Eindhoven	Eerste Divisie	1994–95	29	0	0	0	—		29	0
Career total			110	2	9	1	10	0	129	3
