= Ruben Ligeon =

Dutch footballer (born 1992)

Personal information
- Full name: Ruben Ewald Ligeon
- Date of birth: 24 May 1992 (age 34)
- Place of birth: Amsterdam, Netherlands
- Height: 1.70 m (5 ft 7 in)
- Position: Right-back

Team information
- Current team: Ajax Amateurs
- Number: 2

Youth career
- De Meteoor
- OSV
- 2000–2011: Ajax

Senior career*
| Years | Team | Apps | (Gls) |
| 2011–2016 | Ajax | 12 | (0) |
| 2013–2015 | → Jong Ajax | 33 | (0) |
| 2015 | → NAC Breda (loan) | 14 | (0) |
| 2015 | → Willem II (loan) | 5 | (0) |
| 2016 | → Utrecht (loan) | 7 | (0) |
| 2016–2017 | Slovan Bratislava | 21 | (1) |
| 2018–2019 | PEC Zwolle | 5 | (0) |
| 2019 | → De Graafschap (loan) | 2 | (0) |
| 2019–2021 | AS Trenčín | 33 | (2) |
| 2021–2023 | NAC Breda | 26 | (1) |
| 2023– | Ajax Amateurs | 38 | (0) |

International career
| 2008–2009 | Netherlands U17 | 14 | (1) |
| 2010–2011 | Netherlands U19 | 6 | (0) |
| 2012–2013 | Netherlands U20 | 6 | (0) |
| 2013–2014 | Netherlands U21 | 7 | (0) |
Medal record
Representing Netherlands
UEFA European Under-17 Championship
| Runner-up | Germany 2009 | U-17 Team |
- * Club domestic league appearances and goals as of 18:10, 1 January 2025 (UTC)

Ruben Ewald Ligeon (born 24 May 1992) is a Dutch professional footballer who last played as a right back for Derde Divisie club Ajax Amateurs. Before moving to Slovakia where he featured for Slovan Bratislava and AS Trenčín, he played for Ajax Amsterdam, NAC Breda, Willem II and Utrecht in the Netherlands.

== Club career ==
=== Ajax ===
Ligeon played for De Meteoor and OSV in his early career before joining the youth ranks of Ajax. He made his debut for the first team in a home draw against AZ on 15 October 2011, replacing André Ooijer in the 45th minute. He scored his first goal in the 41st minute of an 8–0 pre-season friendly match win over Noordwijk on 16 July 2012. He scored his second goal in a pre-season friendly encounter the next season against Waalwijk on 13 July 2013, scoring the fourth goal just before half-time in the 5–1 win. On 18 August 2013, Ligeon started in his first ever Klassieker match against arch-rivals Feyenoord, when he replaced the suspended Ricardo van Rhijn in the starting line-up. His cross in the 37th minute led to Kolbeinn Sigþórsson's header and his second goal in the 2–1 home win.

==== NAC Breda ====
On 27 January 2015, it was announced that Ligeon would spend the rest of the season on loan with NAC Breda.

==== Willem II ====
On 22 June 2015, it was announced that Ligeon was sent on loan at Willem II, together with Lesly de Sa and Richairo Zivkovic.

=== Slovan Bratislava ===
Ligeon left Slovan Bratislava on 31 August 2017. Ligeon then trained with the Danish Superliga-club AGF in December 2017.

=== PEC Zwolle ===
On 16 January 2018, Ligeon signed a contract for 2.5 years with Eredivisie side PEC Zwolle.

=== AS Trenčín ===
On 6 July 2019, Ligeon moved to Slovak side AS Trenčín on a free transfer.

=== Return to NAC Breda ===
Ligeon returned to NAC on 22 August 2021, signing a two-year contract.

Ligeon's contract with NAC was terminated by mutual consent on 19 March 2023.

=== Ajax Amateurs ===
On 15 August 2023, Ligeon joined Ajax Amateurs. He helped the team reach promotion to the Derde Divisie in his first season.

== Personal life ==
Born in the Netherlands, Ligeon is of Surinamese descent. He is a younger brother of American international player Maurice Ligeon.

== Career statistics ==
=== Club ===
As of match played 30 November 2024

Appearances and goals by club, season and competition
| Club | Season | League | | | Cup | | Continental | | Other | | Total | |
| Club | Season | Division | Apps | Goals | Apps | Goals | Apps | Goals | Apps | Goals | Apps | Goals |
|---|---|---|---|---|---|---|---|---|---|---|---|---|
| Ajax | 2011–12 | Eredivisie | 3 | 0 | 1 | 0 | 0 | 0 | 0 | 0 | 4 | 0 |
| Ajax | 2012–13 | Eredivisie | 1 | 0 | 1 | 0 | 0 | 0 | 0 | 0 | 2 | 0 |
| Ajax | 2013–14 | Eredivisie | 5 | 0 | 3 | 0 | 0 | 0 | 0 | 0 | 8 | 0 |
| Ajax | 2014–15 | Eredivisie | 3 | 0 | 3 | 0 | 0 | 0 | 1 (Note: Appearance in the Johan Cruyff Shield) | 0 | 7 | 0 |
| Ajax | Total | | 12 | 0 | 8 | 0 | 0 | 0 | 1 | 0 | 21 | 0 |
| Jong Ajax | 2013–14 | Eerste Divisie | 19 | 0 | — | | — | | — | | 19 | 0 |
| Jong Ajax | 2014–15 | Eerste Divisie | 14 | 0 | — | | — | | — | | 14 | 0 |
| Jong Ajax | Total | | 33 | 0 | 0 | 0 | 0 | 0 | 0 | 0 | 33 | 0 |
| NAC Breda (loan) | 2014–15 | Eredivisie | 14 | 0 | 0 | 0 | — | | 4 (Note: Appearances in the Eredivisie play-offs) | 0 | 18 | 0 |
| Willem II (loan) | 2015–16 | Eredivisie | 5 | 0 | 1 | 0 | — | | 0 | 0 | 6 | 0 |
| Utrecht (loan) | 2015–16 | Eredivisie | 7 | 0 | 2 | 0 | — | | 0 | 0 | 9 | 0 |
| Slovan Bratislava | 2016–17 | Slovak Super Liga | 19 | 1 | 1 | 0 | 3 (Note: Appearances in the UEFA Europa League) | 0 | 0 | 0 | 23 | 1 |
| Slovan Bratislava | 2017–18 | Slovak Super Liga | 2 | 0 | 0 | 0 | 1 | 0 | 0 | 0 | 3 | 0 |
| Slovan Bratislava | Total | | 21 | 1 | 1 | 0 | 4 | 0 | 0 | 0 | 26 | 1 |
| PEC Zwolle | 2017–18 | Eredivisie | 4 | 0 | 0 | 0 | — | | 0 | 0 | 4 | 0 |
| PEC Zwolle | 2018–19 | Eredivisie | 2 | 0 | 0 | 0 | — | | 0 | 0 | 2 | 0 |
| PEC Zwolle | Total | | 6 | 0 | 0 | 0 | 0 | 0 | 0 | 0 | 6 | 0 |
| De Graafschap (loan) | 2018–19 | Eredivisie | 2 | 0 | 0 | 0 | — | | 0 | 0 | 2 | 0 |
| Trenčín | 2019–20 | Slovak Super Liga | 17 | 1 | 2 | 2 | — | | 1 (Note: Appearances in the Slovak First Football League play-offs) | 0 | 20 | 3 |
| Trenčín | 2020–21 | Slovak Super Liga | 15 | 1 | 2 | 0 | — | | 0 | 0 | 17 | 1 |
| Trenčín | Total | | 32 | 2 | 4 | 2 | 0 | 0 | 1 | 0 | 37 | 4 |
| NAC Breda | 2021–22 | Eerste Divisie | 22 | 0 | 4 | 0 | — | | 0 | 0 | 26 | 0 |
| NAC Breda | 2022–23 | Eerste Divisie | 4 | 1 | 1 | 0 | — | | — | | 5 | 1 |
| NAC Breda | Total | | 26 | 1 | 5 | 0 | 0 | 0 | 0 | 0 | 31 | 1 |
| Ajax Amateurs | 2023–24 | Vierde Divisie | 25 | 0 | 3 | 0 | — | | — | | 28 | 0 |
| Ajax Amateurs | 2024–25 | Derde Divisie | 13 | 0 | 2 | 0 | — | | — | | 15 | 0 |
| Ajax Amateurs | Total | | 38 | 0 | 5 | 0 | — | | — | | 43 | 0 |
| Career total | | | 196 | 4 | 26 | 2 | 4 | 0 | 6 | 0 | 232 | 6 |

== Honours ==
Ajax

- Eredivisie: 2011–12, 2012–13, 2013–14
- Eusébio Cup: 2014

Ajax Amateurs

- Vierde Divisie: 2023–24
