= Maurice Graef =

Dutch footballer (born 1969)

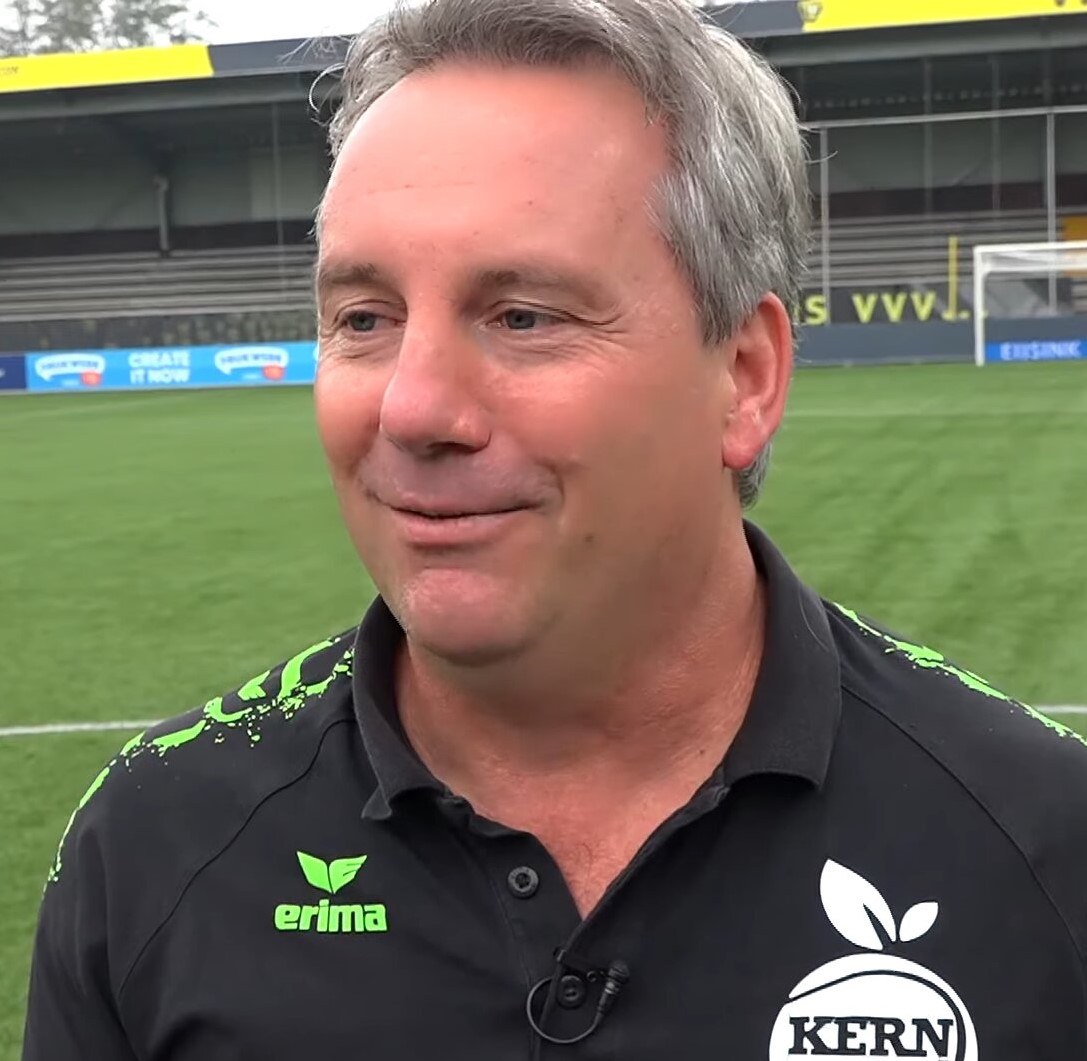
- Graef in 2019

Personal information
- Full name: Maurice Graef
- Date of birth: 22 August 1969 (age 57)
- Place of birth: Horn, Netherlands
- Height: 1.78 m (5 ft 10 in)
- Position: Forward

Youth career
- KSV Horn

Senior career*
Years	Team	Apps	(Gls)
1988–1994	VVV	122	(51)
1994–1996	Roda JC	60	(22)
1996–1997	NEC	16	(4)
1997–2002	VVV	144	(66)
Total		342	(143)
- * Club domestic league appearances and goals as of 12-07-10

Maurice Graef (born 22 August 1969 in Horn, Limburg) is a retired football striker from the Netherlands. He made his professional debut in the 1988-1989 season for VVV-Venlo and ended up playing for Roda JC, NEC Nijmegen before ultimately returning to VVV Venlo.

Graef is VVV's all-time record goalscorer with 134 league and cup goals. He formed a formidable partnership with Nigerian winger Tijjani Babangida in the 1992–93 Eerste Divisie season, winning the league and with Graef ending up as the season's top goalscorer. With Roda JC he finished 2nd in the Eredivisie behind Champions League winners Ajax in his first season with the club and with Graef bagging 16 goals. In his second spell at VVV, Graef was once attacked by a hooligan of his former club NEC during a crucial game between the relegation strugglers but Graef got away unharmed.

== Honours ==
VVV-Venlo

- Eerste Divisie: 1992–93

Individual

- KNVB Cup top scorer: 1991–92
- Eerste Divisie top scorer: 1992–93
