= 1991–92 KNVB Cup =

Tournament details
- Country: Netherlands
- Teams: 63

Final positions
- Champions: Feyenoord
- Runners-up: Roda JC

Tournament statistics
- Top goal scorer(s): Piet Keur (4 goals)

The 1991-92 KNVB Cup was the 74th edition of the Dutch national football annual knockout tournament for the KNVB Cup. 63 teams contested, beginning on 31 August 1991 and ending at the final on 10 May 1992.

Feyenoord beat Roda JC 3–0 and won the cup for the eighth time.

== Teams ==
- All 18 participants of the Eredivisie 1991-92, eleven of which entering in the third round, the rest entering in the second round
- All 20 participants of the Eerste Divisie 1991-92, entering in the second round
- 24 teams from lower (amateur) leagues, five of which entering in the second round
- One youth team

== First round ==
The matches of the first round were played on 31 August 31 and 1 September 1991. Only amateur clubs and one youth team participated.

| Home team | Result | Away team |
|---|---|---|
| VV Aalsmeer | 1–2 | RKSV Halsteren |
| ACV | 0–3 | IJsselmeervogels |
| ADO '20 | 0–3 | VV Noordwijk |
| GVVV | 0–2 | SV Spakenburg |
| KVV Quick '20 | 2–0 | Young sc Heerenveen |
| VV Rheden | 4–0 | HVV Hollandia |
| VV Rozenburg | 1–1 (p: 5–3) | RKSV Babberich |
| VV Spijkenisse | 7–2 | VV Katwijk |
| SV Venray | 2–3 | SV Meerssen |
| Vitesse Delft | 1–2 | OJC Rosmalen |

== Second round ==
The matches of the second round were played on October 12, 1991. Except for eleven Eredivisie teams, all other participants entered the tournament this round.

| Home team | Result | Away team |
|---|---|---|
| NEC _{1} | 5–0 | VV Spijkenisse _{A} |
| RBC _{1} | 5–1 | Quick Boys _{A} |
| VV Rozenburg _{A} | 0–3 | sc Heerenveen _{1} |
| Veendam _{1} | 3–1 | VV DOVO _{A} |
| Telstar _{1} | 5–0 | USV Elinkwijk _{A} |
| TOP Oss _{1} | 2–1 | SV Spakenburg _{A} |
| VCV Zeeland _{1} | 2–3 (aet) | SV Meerssen _{A} |
| VVV _{E} | 3–0 | KVV Quick '20 _{A} |
| Sparta _{E} | 4–1 | Go Ahead Eagles _{1} (on October 13) |
| AZ _{1} | 2–3 (aet) | FC Den Haag _{E} (on October 27) |

| Home team | Result | Away team |
|---|---|---|
| BVV Den Bosch _{1} | 4–1 | SVV/Dordrecht'90 _{E} |
| Cambuur Leeuwarden _{1} | (p) 2-2 | RKSV Halsteren _{A} |
| FC Eindhoven _{1} | 1–0 | IJsselmeervogels _{A} |
| FC Emmen _{1} | 2–1 | VV Noordwijk _{A} |
| Excelsior _{1} | 4–1 | OJC Rosmalen _{A} |
| FC Wageningen _{1} | (p) 3-3 | SC Heracles _{1} |
| FC Zwolle _{1} | 0–2 | VV Rheden _{A} |
| HFC Haarlem _{1} | 2–0 | Excelsior Maassluis _{A} |
| Helmond Sport _{1} | 3–2 | Fortuna Sittard _{E} |
| MVV _{E} | 4–0 | De Graafschap _{E} |
| NAC Breda _{1} | 6–1 | De Treffers _{A} |

_{E} Eredivisie; _{1} Eerste Divisie; _{A} Amateur teams

== Third round ==
The matches of the third round were played on November 16 and 17, 1991. The eleven highest ranked Eredivisie teams from last season entered the tournament here.

| Home team | Result | Away team |
|---|---|---|
| RKC Waalwijk _{E} | 2–4 (aet) | Telstar |
| sc Heerenveen | 0–2 | PSV _{E} |
| BV Veendam | 2–2 (p: 4–5) | Vitesse Arnhem _{E} |
| SV Meerssen | 0–2 | Roda JC _{E} |
| FC Volendam _{E} | 1–1 (p: 3–4) | TOP Oss |
| VVV | 1–1 (p: 4–3) | BVV Den Bosch |
| Sparta | 3–1 | Willem II _{E} (on November 20) |
| Ajax _{E} | 3–1 | FC Den Haag (on January 5, 1992) |

| Home team | Result | Away team |
|---|---|---|
| Feyenoord _{E} | 1–0 | MVV (on November 13) |
| FC Eindhoven | 2–2 (p: 6–5) | FC Wageningen |
| FC Emmen | 1–0 | Excelsior |
| FC Groningen _{E} | 3–2 | Cambuur Leeuwarden |
| HFC Haarlem | 4–3 | NEC |
| NAC Breda | 0–1 | FC Utrecht _{E} |
| VV Rheden | 2–1 | FC Twente _{E} |
| RBC | 2–0 | Helmond Sport |

_{E} eleven Eredivisie entrants

== Round of 16 ==
The matches of the round of 16 were played on January 4 and 5, 1992.

| Home team | Result | Away team |
|---|---|---|
| Telstar | 2–2 (p: 5–4) | FC Eindhoven |
| FC Utrecht | 3–0 | FC Emmen |
| RBC | 1–2 | Feyenoord |
| VV Rheden | 1–1 (p: 6–7) | VVV |
| Roda JC | 2–1 | FC Groningen (on January 8) |
| TOP Oss | 1–6 | HFC Haarlem (on January 22) |
| Sparta | 2–2 (p: 4–3) | Vitesse Arnhem (on February 9) |
| Ajax | 2–1 (aet) | PSV (on February 9) |

== Quarter finals ==
The quarter finals were played on February 26, March 1 and March 8, 1992.

| Home team | Result | Away team |
|---|---|---|
| Roda JC | 4–1 | FC Utrecht |
| VVV | 2–2 (p: 3–4) | Sparta |
| Telstar | 4–1 | HFC Haarlem |
| Feyenoord | 1–0 | Ajax |

== Semi-finals ==
The semi-finals were played on March 31 and April 8, 1992.

| Home team | Result | Away team |
|---|---|---|
| Roda JC | 3–0 | Telstar |
| Feyenoord | 1–1 (p: 5–3) | Sparta |

== Final ==
10 May 1992

| Feyenoord | 3–0 | Roda JC |
|---|---|---|
| De Wolf 28'; Taument 43'; Kiprich 53' |

De Kuip, Rotterdam
Attendance: 48,000
Referee: Mario van der Ende

Feyenoord would participate in the Cup Winners' Cup.
