= 1990–91 KNVB Cup =

Tournament details
- Country: Netherlands
- Teams: 67

Final positions
- Champions: Feyenoord
- Runners-up: BVV Den Bosch

Tournament statistics
- Top goal scorer(s): Romario (5 goals)

The 1990-91 KNVB Cup was the 73rd edition of the Dutch national football annual knockout tournament for the KNVB Cup. 67 teams contested, beginning on 13 October 1990 and ending at the final on 2 June 1991.

Feyenoord beat BVV Den Bosch 1–0 and won the cup for the seventh time.

== Teams ==
- All 18 participants of the Eredivisie 1990-91, eleven of which entering in the second round
- All 20 participants of the Eerste Divisie 1990-91
- 28 teams from lower (amateur) leagues
- One youth team

== First round ==
The matches of the first round were played on 13 - 14 October 1990.

Home team	Result	Away team
NSVV _{A}	2–2 (p: 2–4)	SC Heracles _{1}
Oranje Nassau _{A}	0–1 (aet)	FC Zwolle _{1}
Quick Boys _{A}	5–2	Helmond Sport _{1}
Rijnsburgse Boys _{A}	3–2	Veendam _{1}
SC Genemuiden _{A}	2–3 (aet)	De Graafschap _{1}
Spartaan 1920 _{A}	0–4	FC Eindhoven _{1}
VV Spijkenisse _{A}	1–4	VVV _{1}
SC Enschede _{A}	0–2	NEC _{E}
De Treffers _{A}	2–3	Willem II _{E}
VV TSC _{A}	0–2	SV Meerssen _{A}
De Valleivogels _{A}	3–5 (aet)	VC Vlissingen _{1}
Young Vitesse	1–2 (aet)	BVV Den Bosch _{1}
Vitesse Delft _{A}	1–4	Dordrecht'90 _{1}
VVOG _{A}	0–3	FC Wageningen _{1}

Home team	Result	Away team
Achilles 1894 _{A}	2–1	RBC _{1}
ACV _{A}	0–4	Sparta _{E}
AFC _{A}	0–1	Cambuur Leeuwarden _{1}
RKSV Babberich _{A}	2–3	Excelsior _{1}
VV Bennekom _{A}	0–6	MVV _{E}
Concordia/SVD _{A}	1–4	SVV _{E}
DVC _{A}	0–3	HFC Haarlem _{1}
VV DWV _{A}	1–2	Telstar _{1}
USV Elinkwijk _{A}	4–3 (aet)	AZ _{1}
VV Geldrop/AEK _{A}	3–2	sc Heerenveen _{E}
RKSV Halsteren _{A}	1–2	Go Ahead Eagles _{1}
VV Hoogeveen _{A}	0–3	FC Emmen _{1}
TSV Longa _{A}	0–2	FC Utrecht _{E}
VV Noordwijk _{A}	1–5	NAC Breda _{1}

_{E} Eredivisie; _{1} Eerste Divisie; _{A} Amateur teams

=== Intermediary Round ===
There was only room for 32 teams in the next round, so this intermediary round was held on 14 November 1990.

Home team	Result	Away team
Achilles 1894	1–2	NAC Breda
Cambuur Leeuwarden	1–2	Go Ahead Eagles
FC Eindhoven	1–3 (aet)	FC Wageningen
MVV	0–2	FC Utrecht
Quick Boys	1–2	NEC
Rijnsburgse Boys	0–2	Dordrecht'90
SC Heracles	5–2	Telstar

== Second round ==
The matches of the second round were played on 14, 15 and 16 December 1990. The eleven highest ranked Eredivisie teams from last season entered the tournament this round.

Home team	Result	Away team
PSV _{E}	2–1	FC Zwolle
Roda JC _{E}	4–0	FC Emmen
SC Heracles	0–1	Feyenoord _{E}
Sparta	1–0	FC Volendam _{E}
SV Meerssen	2–2 (p: 4–5)	De Graafschap
SVV	2–1	Fortuna Sittard _{E}
VC Vlissingen	1–3	FC Groningen _{E}
VVV	0–1	FC Utrecht

Home team	Result	Away team
Dordrecht'90	1–0	FC Twente _{E}
USV Elinkwijk	1–3 (aet)	Willem II
Excelsior	0–5	Ajax _{E}
FC Den Haag _{E}	5–3	HFC Haarlem
VV Geldrop/AEK	1–4	BVV Den Bosch
Go Ahead Eagles	2–3	Vitesse Arnhem _{E}
NAC Breda	1–0	RKC Waalwijk _{E}
NEC	1–2	FC Wageningen

_{E} eleven Eredivisie entrants

== Round of 16 ==
The matches of the round of 16 were played on 23 January 1991.

Home team	Result	Away team
Ajax	3–1	FC Groningen
BVV Den Bosch	3–1	Sparta
Feyenoord	2–1	NAC Breda
PSV	8–1	FC Wageningen
Willem II	5–0	SVV
Roda JC	2–1	FC Utrecht (on 11 Jan.)
Vitesse Arnhem	3–1	FC Den Haag (on 13 January)
De Graafschap	1–1 (p: 3–4)	Dordrecht'90 (on 27 February)

== Quarter finals ==
The quarter finals were played on 27 February 1991.

Home team	Result	Away team
BVV Den Bosch	0–0 (p: 4–3)	Vitesse Arnhem
Roda JC	1–0	Ajax
Willem II	2–3 (aet)	PSV
FC Dordrecht	1–3	Feyenoord (on 12 March)

== Semi-finals ==
The semi-finals were played on 27 March and 11 April 1991.

Home team	Result	Away team
BVV Den Bosch	2–2 (p: 4–2)	Roda JC
PSV	0–1	Feyenoord

== Final ==
2 June 1991

Feyenoord	1–0	BVV Den Bosch
Witschge 8'

De Kuip, Rotterdam
Attendance: 52,000
Referee: John Blankenstein

Feyenoord would participate in the Cup Winners' Cup.
