= Harry van den Ham =

Dutch footballer and manager

Personal information
- Date of birth: 16 August 1954 (age 72)
- Place of birth: Bandung, Indonesia
- Height: 5 ft 11 in (1.80 m)
- Position: Forward

Youth career
- UVV Utrecht
- 1965–19701: Elinkwijk

Senior career*
Years	Team	Apps	(Gls)
1971–1975	Elinkwijk		
1975–1979	Utrecht	24	(3)
1977–1978	→ Cambuur (loan)	29	(10)
1978–1979	→ Den Bosch (loan)	9	(2)
1979–1982	DS '79	73	(27)
1980	→ Tulsa Roughnecks (loan)	4	(0)
1982–1983	Berchem Sport		
1983–1985	Utrecht	15	(5)
1984–1985	→ PEC Zwolle (loan)	15	(1)
1985–1988	Holland		
1988–1989	FC VVV	10	(1)
1990–1991	Vlissingen	25	(2)
1991–1992	Hilversum		
Total		206	(51)

International career
1979	Netherlands U21	1	(0)

Managerial career
- 1992–1994: RKC (assistant)
- 1994–1995: Utrecht (assistant)
- 1995–1997: SHO
- 1997–1998: Telstar
- 1998–2000: Holland
- 2000–2002: Dordrecht
- 2002–2005: TOP Oss
- 2005–2007: Utrecht (assistant)
- 2007: IJsselmeervogels
- 2010–2011: Elinkwijk
- 2012: Dordrecht
- 2013–2014: Dordrecht
- 2014–2015: Utrecht (assistant)
- 2015–2016: Dordrecht
- 2020: Dordrecht
- * Club domestic league appearances and goals

Harry Van Den Ham (born 16 August 1954) is a Dutch professional football manager and former player.

== Playing career ==
Van den Ham was born in Bandung and moved with his Dutch father, Indonesian mother and six siblings to Holland when he was two years old. He played for UVV Utrecht in his youth and from the age of 11 began playing for USV Elinkwijk. With Elinkwijk, he became Dutch champions with the Sunday amateurs in 1974. In 1975, he switched from the amateurs to professional football. Van den Ham subsequently played in the Netherlands for FC Utrecht, SC Cambuur, FC Den Bosch, DS '79 and PEC Zwolle. In 1980, he was briefly playing for the Tulsa Roughnecks in the United States. In Belgium he also played for Berchem Sport alongside compatriots Paul Postuma and Dick Advocaat.

In 1985, Van den Ham began playing with the Utrecht-based amateur association USV Holland. At the age of 34, Van den Ham made his comeback in the Eredivisie for VVV in 1988. From 1990, he played for another year for VC Vlissingen, after which he retired from his active professional career.

Van den Ham played once for the Netherlands national under-21 football team.

== Managerial career ==
Van den Ham started his coaching career in 1992 as an assistant at RKC. In 1994, he became an assistant coach of FC Utrecht and subsequently he was head coach at SHO, Telstar and USV Holland, respectively. From 2000, he was the head coach of FC Dordrecht for two years and then for three years of TOP Oss.

In 2005, Van den Ham again became an assistant coach at FC Utrecht. In 2007, he was appointed by IJsselmeervogels as successor to the departing Cees Lok, but after six months the contract was dissolved due to a difference of opinion. In the 2011–12 season, he temporarily took over the tasks of the ill Theo Bos at FC Dordrecht. In the 2013–14 season he became the head coach of FC Dordrecht. He was succeeded by Ernie Brandts.

On 23 May 2014, Van den Ham was added to FC Utrecht's technical staff. He succeeded Jan Everse in August 2015 as head coach of FC Dordrecht.

In February 2020, van den Ham again took over as caretaker manager of FC Dordrecht after Claudio Braga was dismissed from the position after 14 months in charge. He was fired on 10 November 2020, after a 5–1 loss to FC Eindhoven, as Dordrecht were placed last in the league.

== Career statistics ==
=== Club ===
Club	Season	League			Cup		Other		Total	
Club	Season	Division	Apps	Goals	Apps	Goals	Apps	Goals	Apps	Goals
Utrecht	1975–76	Eredivisie	10	1	0	0	0	0	10	1
Utrecht	1976–77	Eredivisie	7	0	0	0	0	0	7	0
Utrecht	1977–78	Eredivisie	0	0	0	0	0	0	0	0
Utrecht	1978–79	Eredivisie	8	2	1 (Note: Appearances in the KNVB Cup)	0	0	0	9	2
Utrecht	Total		25	3	1	0	0	0	26	3
Cambuur (loan)	1977–78	Eerste Divisie	29	10	2	1	0	0	31	11
Den Bosch (loan)	1978–79	Eerste Divisie	9	2	0	0	0	0	9	2
DS '79	1979–80	Eerste Divisie	34	17	3	2	0	0	37	19
DS '79	1980–81	Eerste Divisie	21	3	0	0	0	0	21	3
DS '79	1981–82	Eerste Divisie	19	7	0	0	0	0	19	7
DS '79	Total		74	27	3	2	0	0	77	29
Tulsa Roughnecks (loan)	1980	NASL	4	0	0	0	0	0	4	0
Utrecht	1983–84	Eredivisie	15	5	0	0	0	0	15	5
Utrecht	1984–85	Eredivisie	0	0	0	0	0	0	0	0
Utrecht	Total		15	5	0	0	0	0	15	5
PEC Zwolle (loan)	1984–85	Eredivisie	15	1	0	0	0	0	15	1
VVV-Venlo	1988–89	Eerste Divisie	10	1	0	0	0	0	10	1
Vlissingen	1990–91	Eerste Divisie	25	2	0	0	0	0	25	2
Career total			206	51	6	3	0	0	212	54

=== Managerial ===
As of match played 21 October 2020

Managerial record by club and tenure
Team	From	To	Record				
Team	From	To	M	W	D	L	Win %
Dordrecht	26 July 2012	22 December 2012	19	9	5	5	47.37
Dordrecht	1 July 2013	30 June 2014	43	24	11	8	55.81
Dordrecht	20 August 2015	30 June 2016	36	11	7	18	30.56
Dordrecht	8 February 2020	10 November 2020	16	2	3	11	12.50
Total			114	46	26	42	40.35
