= Sander Oostrom =

Dutch footballer (born 1967)

Personal information
- Date of birth: 14 July 1967 (age 59)
- Place of birth: Tuindorp Oostzaan, Netherlands
- Positions: Striker; attacking midfielder

Youth career
- 1974–1981: De Meteoor
- 1981–1985: OSV Amsterdam

Senior career*
Years	Team	Apps	(Gls)
1985–1987	OSV Amsterdam		
1987–1995	Telstar	259	(74)
1995–1997	NAC Breda	24	(2)
1997–1998	Pohang Steelers	12	(3)
1998–2000	Haarlem	41	(13)
2000–2002	Telstar	60	(13)
2002–2006	Türkiyemspor		
- * Club domestic league appearances and goals

Sander Oostrom (born 14 July 1967) is a Dutch former professional footballer who played as a striker and an attacking midfielder. Until 2023, he was the all-time top scorer of Telstar, before being surpassed by Glynor Plet.

== Career ==
Oostrom started playing football for the youth team of De Meteoor before moving on to OSV Amsterdam, where he spent four years and eventually made it to the first team. Under the guidance of head coach Joop Burgers, Oostrom honed his skills for two years. His style of play relied heavily on intuition, and it was only under the guidance of Joop Burgers at OSV that he learned defensive techniques and positional awareness. Head coach of Argonaut-Zwarte Schapen, Peter de Waal, recognised his potential, and after moving to second-tier Eerste Divisie club Telstar as assistant coach in 1987, he brought Oostrom to the club. When Oostrom joined Telstar in 1987, he lacked the formal training and education that professional footballers often receive. Oostrom acknowledges that he was not lazy on the field but rather lacked the structured education that could have enhanced his overall game. He had developed a mindset of waiting for the ball, relying on his individual skills to make an impact. While this approach worked for him and resulted in victories for his team at a lower level, he later analysed his career and realised that he could have potentially reached the professional ranks earlier if he had received proper training.

During his first six months at Telstar, Oostrom primarily played for the reserve team. However, when head coach Cor van der Hart departed and De Waal took charge, Oostrom immediately found himself in the starting lineup. His performances for Telstar were prolific, as he consistently scored goals throughout ten seasons, spanning from 1987–88 to 1994–95, and again from 2000–01 to 2002–03. With a total of 87 official goals, he became the all-time leading goalscorer for the club, until being surpassed by Glynor Plet in 2023. Reflecting on his time at Telstar, Oostrom admits that he may have stayed at the club for too long. He had ambitions of playing at a higher level and felt that he had the potential to do so. In March 1995, there was reported interest from 1. FC Köln manager Morten Olsen, who had scouted Oostrom in a match against Helmond Sport that same month, but a move never materialised.

After eight years at Telstar, Oostrom joined Eredivisie club NAC Breda in 1995. Despite a promising start, he struggled with injuries in his second season at the club and mainly appeared as a substitute. Through Piet Buter and Ger Lagendijk, a South Korean adventure with Pohang Steelers presented a solution to his situation: "I could earn five times as much there. I was allowed to come for a five-day trial, and after just one and a half days, I could already sign."

He returned to the Netherlands where he signed for Eerste Divisie club Haarlem in January 1999. He extended his contract with the club in May 1999, after scoring five goals in 18 appearances during the second half of the season. As his contract expired, he rejoined Telstar in 2000 where he played for two years before retiring from professional football in 2002.

At the age of 35, he continued his career in amateur football. John Kila, who was then the assistant coach of Telstar, became the head coach of Türkiyemspor and brought Oostrom along. There, he played for four more seasons. "It was a fantastic club with a great atmosphere. We became champions of the Hoofdklasse three times and amateur champions of the Netherlands twice." After the last championship, Oostrom definitively retired from football.

== Honours ==
Türkiyemspor

- Sunday Hoofdklasse: 2002–03, 2005–06
- Sunday Hoofdklasse A: 2002–03, 2003–04, 2005–06
