= 1991–92 Eerste Divisie =

36th season of the second-tier football league in Netherlands

Eerste Divisie
- Season: 1991–92
- Champions: Cambuur Leeuw.
- Promoted: Cambuur Leeuw.; BVV Den Bosch; Go Ahead Eagles
- Goals: 1,115
- Average goals/game: 2.93
- Top goalscorer: Erik Tammer; 33 goals

The Dutch Eerste Divisie in the 1991–92 season was contested by 20 teams. TOP Oss from the amateurs replaced Dordrecht '90 who had merged with eredivisie-club SVV. Cambuur Leeuwarden won the championship.

== New entrants ==
Entering from amateur football

- TOP Oss

Relegated from the 1990–91 Eredivisie

- sc Heerenveen
- NEC Nijmegen

VC Vlissingen changed their name for this season to VCV Zeeland.

== League standings ==
Pos	Team	Pld	W	D	L	GF	GA	GD	Pts	Promotion or relegation
1	Cambuur Leeuwarden	38	22	9	7	67	40	+27	53	Promotion to Eredivisie
2	BVV Den Bosch	38	18	11	9	57	42	+15	47	Play-offs
3	sc Heerenveen	38	19	7	12	79	50	+29	45	
4	NAC Breda	38	16	12	10	65	48	+17	44	Play-offs
5	RBC	38	15	14	9	60	45	+15	44 (Note: RBC and FC Eindhoven played a play-off to determine the fourth period champion. Eindhoven won 2-0 and entered the regular play-offs.)	
6	SC Heracles	38	16	12	10	61	50	+11	44	Play-offs
7	Telstar	38	17	7	14	78	61	+17	41	
8	NEC	38	16	9	13	66	54	+12	41	
9	FC Wageningen	38	15	11	12	43	36	+7	41	Bankruptcy
10	HFC Haarlem	38	16	9	13	56	60	−4	41	
11	Go Ahead Eagles	38	17	6	15	63	59	+4	40	Play-offs
12	Veendam	38	15	10	13	48	49	−1	40	
13	AZ	38	14	11	13	55	40	+15	39	
14	FC Eindhoven	38	12	13	13	49	48	+1	37	Play-offs
15	Excelsior	38	14	6	18	61	74	−13	34	Play-offs
16	Helmond Sport	38	11	11	16	50	69	−19	33	
17	Zwolle	38	9	13	16	44	64	−20	31	
18	FC Emmen	38	8	13	17	37	56	−19	29	
19	TOP Oss	38	6	10	22	40	77	−37	22	
20	VCV Zeeland	38	4	6	28	36	93	−57	14	Returned to amateur football

Source: rsssf.com

== Promotion/relegation play-offs ==
The promotion/relegation play-offs consisted of three rounds. In the group round, four period winners (the best teams during each of the four quarters of the regular competition) and two (other) best placed teams in the league, played in two groups of three teams. The group winners would play in play-off 1. The winners of that play-off would be promoted to the Eredivisie, the loser had to take on the number 16 of the Eredivisie in play-off 2. These two teams played for the third and last position in the Eredivisie of next season.

Group 1
Pos	Team	Pld	W	D	L	GF	GA	GD	Pts	Qualification
1	Go Ahead Eagles	4	2	2	0	4	2	+2	6	Play-off 1
2	NAC Breda	4	2	1	1	4	1	+3	5	
3	SC Heracles	4	0	1	3	2	7	−5	1	

Source: rsssf.com

Group 2
Pos	Team	Pld	W	D	L	GF	GA	GD	Pts	Qualification
1	BVV Den Bosch	4	1	3	0	5	3	+2	5	Play-off 1
2	FC Eindhoven	4	1	3	0	4	2	+2	5	
3	Excelsior	4	0	2	2	1	5	−4	2	

Source: rsssf.com

Play-off 1

Team 1	Agg.	Team 2	1st leg	2nd leg
Go Ahead Eagles	1-3	BVV Den Bosch	1-0	0-3

BVV Den Bosch: promoted to Eredivisie
Go Ahead Eagles: play-off 2

Play-off 2

Team 1	Agg.	Team 2	1st leg	2nd leg
Go Ahead Eagles	4-0	FC Den Haag	3-0	1-0

Go Ahead Eagles: promoted to Eredivisie
FC Den Haag: relegated to Eerste Divisie

== Attendances ==
#	Club	Average
1	Heerenveen	8,185
2	Cambuur	6,716
3	NAC	4,672
4	AZ	3,616
5	Go Ahead	3,416
6	Telstar	3,294
7	Veendam	2,411
8	RBC	2,329
9	Zwolle	2,315
10	Heracles	2,255
11	Emmen	2,172
12	Den Bosch	2,062
13	Wageningen	2,029
14	Oss	1,973
15	Helmond	1,848
16	NEC	1,674
17	Eindhoven	1,643
18	Haarlem	1,638
19	VCV	1,545
20	Excelsior	697

== See also ==
- 1991–92 Eredivisie
- 1991–92 KNVB Cup
