= Maurice Ligeon =

American soccer player

Personal information
- Full name: Maurice Ligeon
- Date of birth: September 2, 1977 (age 49)
- Place of birth: New York City, Queens, United States
- Position: Midfielder

Senior career*
Years	Team	Apps	(Gls)
1993–1994	Club Brugge	0	(0)
1996–1998	Telstar	22	(0)
1999–2003	SV Huizen		
2005–2007	KSJB		
2009–2010	AS'80		
2010	Forza Almere		

International career
1994	United States	1	(0)

Managerial career
- 2010–2012: S.V. The Brothers
- 2012–2017: FC Almere
- 2018–2019: VV Unicum
- * Club domestic league appearances and goals

Maurice Ligeon (born September 2, 1977) is an American former professional soccer player of Surinamese descent, who spent his entire career in Europe and earned one cap with the United States national team.

== Playing career ==
=== Club ===
Ligeon began his career on the Club Brugge K.V. youth team. He played the 1997–98 season with Dutch Second Division club Telstar. He was then listed with the amateur club SV Huizen from 1999 to 2002. He left the team during the 2001–02 season, but returned for the 2002–03 season only to resign again on December 16, 2003. He was then listed with KSJB from 2005 to 2007.

=== international ===
Ligeon earned one cap with the United States national team, as a 17-year old in a 2–1 loss to Saudi Arabia in Dhahran on October 19, 1994, when he came on for Lawrence Lozzano in the 72nd minute.

== Managerial career ==
In September 2010 he joined Clarence Seedorf's Surinamese club S.V. The Brothers as manager. In the summer of 2012, Ligeon was appointed manager of Dutch amateur team FC Almere. In the summer of 2018, Ligeon was appointed manager of Dutch team VV Unicum Lelystad.

== Personal life ==
Ligeon is of Surinamese descent and the brother of Ruben Ligeon.
