= Niek Michel =

Dutch footballer

Personal information
- Date of birth: 30 September 1912
- Place of birth: Velsen, Netherlands
- Date of death: 24 June 1971 (aged 58)
- Position: Goalkeeper

Senior career*
Years	Team	Apps	(Gls)
- VSV

International career
1938–1940	Netherlands	1	(0)
- * Club domestic league appearances and goals

Nicolaas Johannes Michel (30 September 1912 - 24 June 1971) was a Dutch football goalkeeper who played for the Netherlands in the 1938 FIFA World Cup. He also played for Telstar.
