= 1990–91 Eerste Divisie =

35th season of the second-tier football league in Netherlands

Eerste Divisie
- Season: 1990–91
- Champions: De Graafschap
- Promoted: De Graafschap; VVV-Venlo
- Goals: 1,148
- Average goals/game: 3.02
- Top goalscorer: Ton Cornelissen; 35 goals

The Dutch Eerste Divisie in the 1990–91 season was contested by 20 teams, one more than in the previous season. This was due to VC Vlissingen entering from the amateurs. De Graafschap won the championship.

== New entrants ==
Entering from amateur football

- VC Vlissingen

Relegated from the 1989–90 Eredivisie

- BVV Den Bosch
- HFC Haarlem

DS '79 changed their name to Dordrecht '90 this season.

== League standings ==
Pos	Team	Pld	W	D	L	GF	GA	GD	Pts	Promotion or qualification
1	De Graafschap	38	25	11	2	84	34	+50	61	Promotion to Eredivisie
2	NAC Breda	38	21	14	3	94	50	+44	56	Play-offs
3	VVV-Venlo	38	21	7	10	73	46	+27	49	Play-offs
4	AZ	38	15	15	8	56	38	+18	45	Play-offs
5	Helmond Sport	38	14	16	8	57	43	+14	44	
6	SC Heracles	38	13	18	7	50	36	+14	44	
7	Go Ahead Eagles	38	14	15	9	57	43	+14	43	
8	Dordrecht '90	38	15	13	10	63	51	+12	43	Play-offs
9	FC Eindhoven	38	17	8	13	54	52	+2	42	Play-offs
10	RBC	38	12	15	11	65	56	+9	39	
11	Cambuur Leeuwarden	38	12	13	13	41	47	−6	37	
12	FC Emmen	38	10	16	12	54	67	−13	36	
13	Telstar	38	9	15	14	51	58	−7	33	
14	HFC Haarlem	38	11	10	17	52	78	−26	32	
15	FC Wageningen	38	10	10	18	71	82	−11	30	
16	FC Zwolle	38	8	14	16	40	60	−20	30	Play-offs
17	BVV Den Bosch	38	9	11	18	54	60	−6	29	
18	Veendam	38	5	15	18	47	78	−31	25	
19	Excelsior	38	8	7	23	50	82	−32	23	
20	VC Vlissingen	38	6	7	25	35	87	−52	19	

Source: rsssf.com

== Promotion/relegation play-offs ==
The promotion/relegation play-offs consisted of three rounds. In the group round, four period winners (the best teams during each of the four quarters of the regular competition) and two (other) best placed teams in the league, played in two groups of three teams. The group winners would play in play-off 1. The winners of that play-off would be promoted to the Eredivisie, the loser had to take on the number 16 of the Eredivisie in play-off 2. These two teams played for the third and last position in the Eredivisie of next season.

Group 1
Pos	Team	Pld	W	D	L	GF	GA	GD	Pts	Qualification
1	NAC Breda	4	2	2	0	8	3	+5	6	Play-off 1
2	FC Zwolle	4	1	2	1	5	6	−1	4	
3	AZ	4	0	2	2	5	9	−4	2	

Source: rsssf.com

Group 2
Pos	Team	Pld	W	D	L	GF	GA	GD	Pts	Qualification
1	VVV-Venlo	4	2	2	0	6	3	+3	6	Play-off 1
2	FC Eindhoven	4	1	1	2	5	6	−1	3	
3	Dordrecht '90	4	1	1	2	4	6	−2	3	(Note: Dordrecht '90 would merge with eredivisie-club SVV next year to form SVV/Dordrecht '90.)

Source: rsssf.com
Notes:

Play-off 1

Team 1	Agg.	Team 2	1st leg	2nd leg
VVV-Venlo	(a)2-2	NAC Breda	1-0	1-2

VVV-Venlo: promoted to Eredivisie
NAC Breda: play-off 2

Play-off 2

Team 1	Agg.	Team 2	1st leg	2nd leg
NAC Breda	2-5	SVV	1-4	1-1

SVV: remain in Eredivisie and merge with Dordrecht '90
NAC Breda: remain in Eerste Divisie

== Attendances ==
#	Club	Average
1	De Graafschap	5,554
2	NAC	5,317
3	VVV	3,747
4	AZ	3,635
5	Cambuur	3,531
6	Helmond	3,090
7	Go Ahead	2,587
8	VCV	2,568
9	Emmen	2,307
10	Eindhoven	2,106
11	Heracles	2,100
12	Zwolle	2,100
13	RBC	1,966
14	Veendam	1,895
15	Wageningen	1,749
16	Dordrecht	1,712
17	Telstar	1,699
18	Den Bosch	1,462
19	Haarlem	1,275
20	Excelsior	661

== See also ==
- 1990–91 Eredivisie
- 1990–91 KNVB Cup
