= 1992–93 Eerste Divisie =

37th season of the second-tier football league in Netherlands

Eerste Divisie
- Season: 1992–93
- Champions: VVV
- Promoted: VVV; Heerenveen; NAC
- Goals: 993
- Average goals/game: 3.24
- Top goalscorer: Maurice Graef (VVV), 29 goals

The Dutch Eerste Divisie in the 1992–93 season was contested by 18 teams, two less than in the previous season. This was due to the demise of VCV Zeeland and FC Wageningen. VVV won the championship.

The play-off system was changed again this season, it was made less complex. A second team from the Eredivisie now was offered a chance to avert relegation. Only a group round was held in which six entrants were divided in two groups of three teams. Four entrants were from this league, the two others were the numbers 16 and 17 from the Eredivisie.

== New entrants ==
Relegated from the 1991–92 Eredivisie

- ADO Den Haag, renamed from FC Den Haag
- De Graafschap
- VVV

== League standings ==
Pos	Team	Pld	W	D	L	GF	GA	GD	Pts	Promotion or qualification
1	VVV	34	24	2	8	84	46	+38	50	Promotion to Eredivisie
2	Heerenveen	34	19	10	5	85	48	+37	48	Play-offs
3	NAC	34	19	7	8	73	39	+34	45	Play-offs
4	NEC	34	17	10	7	62	39	+23	44	Play-offs
5	De Graafschap	34	17	8	9	58	50	+8	42	Play-offs
6	FC Zwolle	34	16	8	10	55	38	+17	40	
7	RBC	34	17	5	12	70	56	+14	39	
8	ADO Den Haag	34	15	8	11	65	61	+4	38	
9	TOP Oss	34	13	9	12	49	49	0	35	
10	AZ	34	11	10	13	54	52	+2	32	
11	Haarlem	34	12	8	14	49	61	−12	32	
12	Emmen	34	9	9	16	44	66	−22	27	
13	Helmond Sport	34	8	10	16	53	74	−21	26	
14	Excelsior	34	7	10	17	40	69	−29	24	
15	Eindhoven	34	7	9	18	40	59	−19	23	
16	Veendam	34	6	10	18	32	60	−28	22	
17	Heracles	34	7	8	19	29	58	−29	22	
18	Telstar	34	8	7	19	51	68	−17	21 (Note: 2 points deducted?)	

Source: rsssf.com

== Promotion/relegation play-offs ==
There was only one round in the promotion/relegation play-offs this year. Six entrants (four from this league, two from the Eredivisie) entered in two groups. The two group winners were promoted to (or remained in) the Eredivisie.

Group 1
Pos	Team	Pld	W	D	L	GF	GA	GD	Pts	Promotion or relegation
1	sc Heerenveen	4	3	0	1	7	4	+3	6	Promotion to Eredivisie
2	Fortuna Sittard	4	2	0	2	8	4	+4	4	Relegation from Eredivisie
3	NEC	4	1	0	3	4	11	−7	2	

Source: rsssf.com

Group 2
Pos	Team	Pld	W	D	L	GF	GA	GD	Pts	Promotion or relegation
1	NAC	4	4	0	0	11	1	+10	8	Promotion to Eredivisie
2	FC Den Bosch	4	1	0	3	4	7	−3	2	Relegation from Eredivisie
3	De Graafschap	4	1	0	3	3	12	−9	2	

Source: rsssf.com

== Attendances ==
#	Club	Average
1	Heerenveen	8,506
2	NAC	4,881
3	VVV	4,321
4	De Graafschap	4,143
5	NEC	3,380
6	AZ	3,310
7	Zwolle	2,835
8	RBC	2,804
9	Veendam	2,250
10	Emmen	2,200
11	Oss	2,184
12	ADO	2,109
13	Telstar	2,064
14	Eindhoven	1,984
15	Helmond	1,959
16	Haarlem	1,756
17	Heracles	1,522
18	Excelsior	938

== See also ==
- 1992–93 Eredivisie
- 1992–93 KNVB Cup
