= Emiel Dorst =

Dutch footballer (born 1970)

Personal information
- Date of birth: 25 December 1970 (age 55)
- Place of birth: Oosterland, Netherlands
- Position: Midfielder

Youth career
- Duiveland
- Kloetinge
- Zierikzee

Senior career*
Years	Team	Apps	(Gls)
1990–1992	Vlissingen	65	(9)
1992–1993	NAC	4	(0)
1993–1995	Tubantia Borgerhout		
1995–1999	RBC	111	(11)
1999–2000	TOP Oss	16	(0)
Total		196	(20)
- * Club domestic league appearances and goals

Emiel Dorst (25 December 1970) is a Dutch retired footballer who played as a midfielder. After professional football, Dorst worked as a boat carpenter and furniture maker.

== Career ==
Dorst was born in Oosterland, Zeeland. He started playing at SV Duiveland and at VV Kloetinge, playing in higher leagues, he reached the first team. He next played at VV Zierikzee.

In 1990 Dorst turned professional at VC Vlissingen. The next season the financially struggling professional team continued as VCV Zeeland and eventually discontinued. Dorst continued in 1992 to NAC where he played in the first and second squad. In 1993 Dorst transferred to Tubantia Borgerhout in Belgium. He left this club in 1995 to play for RBC in the Eerste Divisie. Starting December 1999 he played in TOP Oss, also in the Eerste Divisie.

In 2000, Dorst returned to Kloetinge and in 2006 he made his last transfer to Bruse Boys.

== Personal life ==
In 2018, Emiel's son Yarick Dorst joined BVV Barendrecht in the Tweede Divisie. Yarick relegated with BVV to the Derde Divisie, then transferred to neighboring ASWH in the Tweede. He left ASWH in 2022 for SC Feyenoord.
