= Ton Cornelissen =

Dutch footballer (born 1964)

Personal information
- Full name: Antonius Cornelissen
- Date of birth: 24 January 1964 (age 62)
- Place of birth: Breda, Netherlands
- Position: Forward

Senior career*
Years	Team	Apps	(Gls)
1981–1985	NAC	42	(6)
1985–1986	RKC	32	(6)
1986–1987	De Graafschap	35	(15)
1987–1988	Germinal Ekeren		
1988–1991	NAC	103	(59)
1992	Eendracht Aalst		
1992–1993	Eindhoven	19	(14)
1993	Sparta	6	(1)
1993–1994	Poederlee		
1994–1995	RBC		
- * Club domestic league appearances and goals

Antonius "Ton" Cornelissen (born 24 January 1964) is a Dutch former professional footballer who played as a forward. He is best known for finishing as top scorer in the 1990–91 Eerste Divisie with 35 goals for NAC Breda, a season in which he was also named the division's player of the year.

== Club career ==
Cornelissen began his senior career with NAC, making his first-team debut in 1981. He later had spells with RKC Waalwijk, De Graafschap and Belgian side Germinal Ekeren before returning to NAC in 1988.

In the 1990–91 campaign, Cornelissen scored 35 league goals for NAC (while also working in Breda's casino) winning the division's golden boot. NAC finished runners-up and reached the promotion play-offs, defeating VVV-Venlo in the final but ultimately remaining in the Eerste Divisie after losing the promotion/relegation tie to SVV.

Cornelissen moved to Belgian top-flight club Eendracht Aalst in early 1992 and spent the following season back in the Netherlands with FC Eindhoven and Sparta Rotterdam. He scored once in the Eredivisie for Sparta in February 1993 in a 2–0 win over FC Den Bosch. He later played for Belgian club Poederlee and concluded his professional career with RBC Roosendaal in 1995.

== Post-playing career ==
After retiring, Cornelissen worked in Dutch football as a coach and scout. In 2014, he was appointed as a scout by NAC while also coaching at Kozakken Boys alongside Danny Buijs. He later was in charge at TSC and served as assistant coach at IJsselmeervogels in the Dutch second tier of amateur football. He also was head coach at amateur sides SCO, Oisterwijk and Altena.

== Honours ==
Individual

- Eerste Divisie top scorer: 1990–91 (35 goals)
- Eerste Divisie Player of the Year: 1990
