= Fred André =

Dutch footballer (1941–2017)

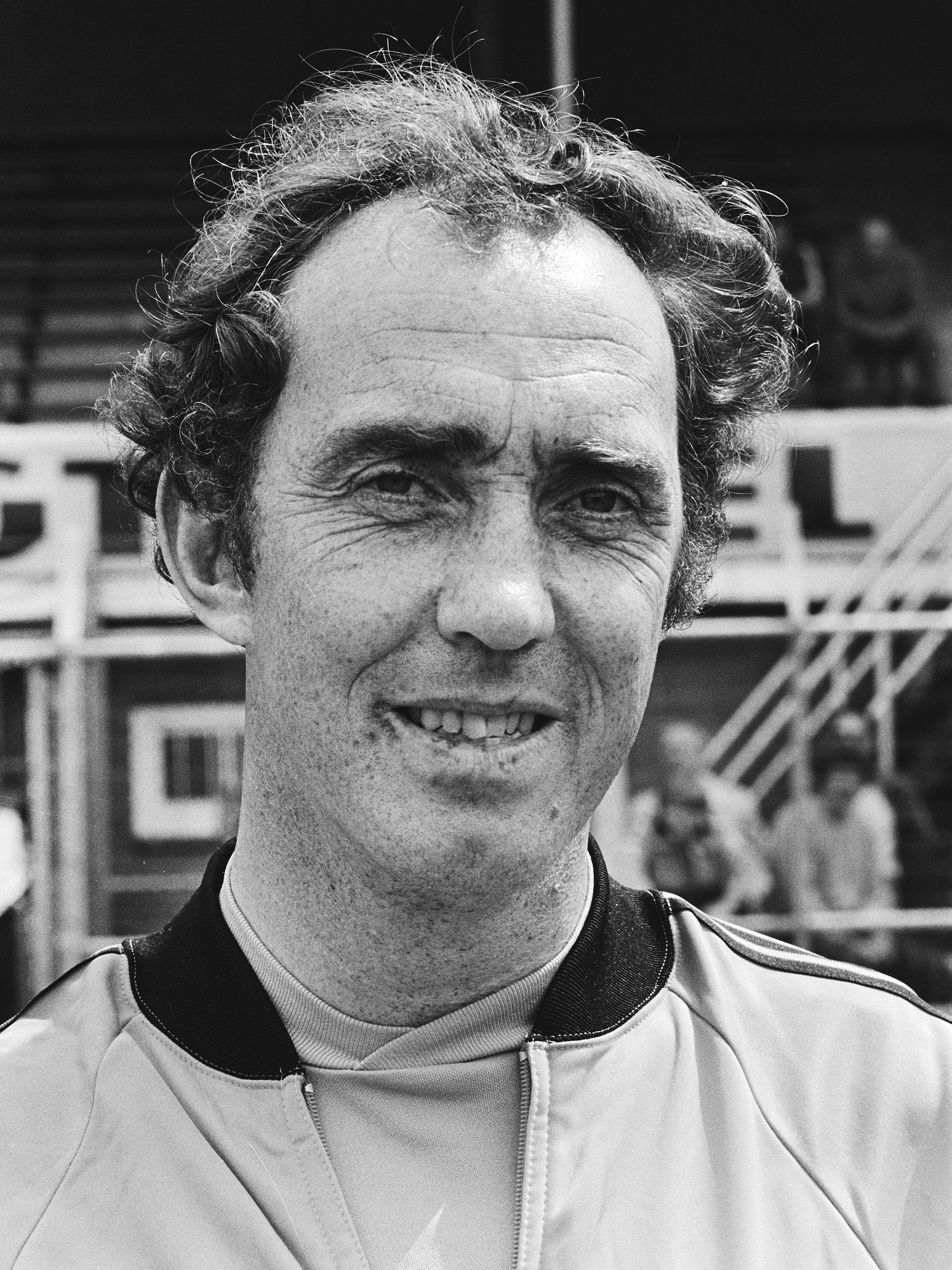
- André in June 1979

Personal information
- Date of birth: 31 May 1941
- Place of birth: Haarlem, Netherlands
- Date of death: 24 January 2017 (aged 75)
- Place of death: Haarlem
- Position: Centre-back

Senior career*
Years	Team	Apps	(Gls)
1961–1963	VSV	37	(23)
1963–1976	Telstar	327	(17)
1977–1979	Volendam	74	(2)
Total		438	(42)

Managerial career
- 1983–1987: Telstar
- * Club domestic league appearances and goals

Fred André (31 May 1941 – 24 January 2017) was a Dutch footballer. He played as a centre-back at club level from the early-1960s to the late-1970s. He was best known for playing for Telstar from 1963 to 1976, making 328 appearances for the club. He also played for Volendam. He later managed Telstar from 1983 to 1987.

André died on 24 January 2017 at the age of 75.
