= Horn, Netherlands =

Horn Häör (Limburgish)
- Village
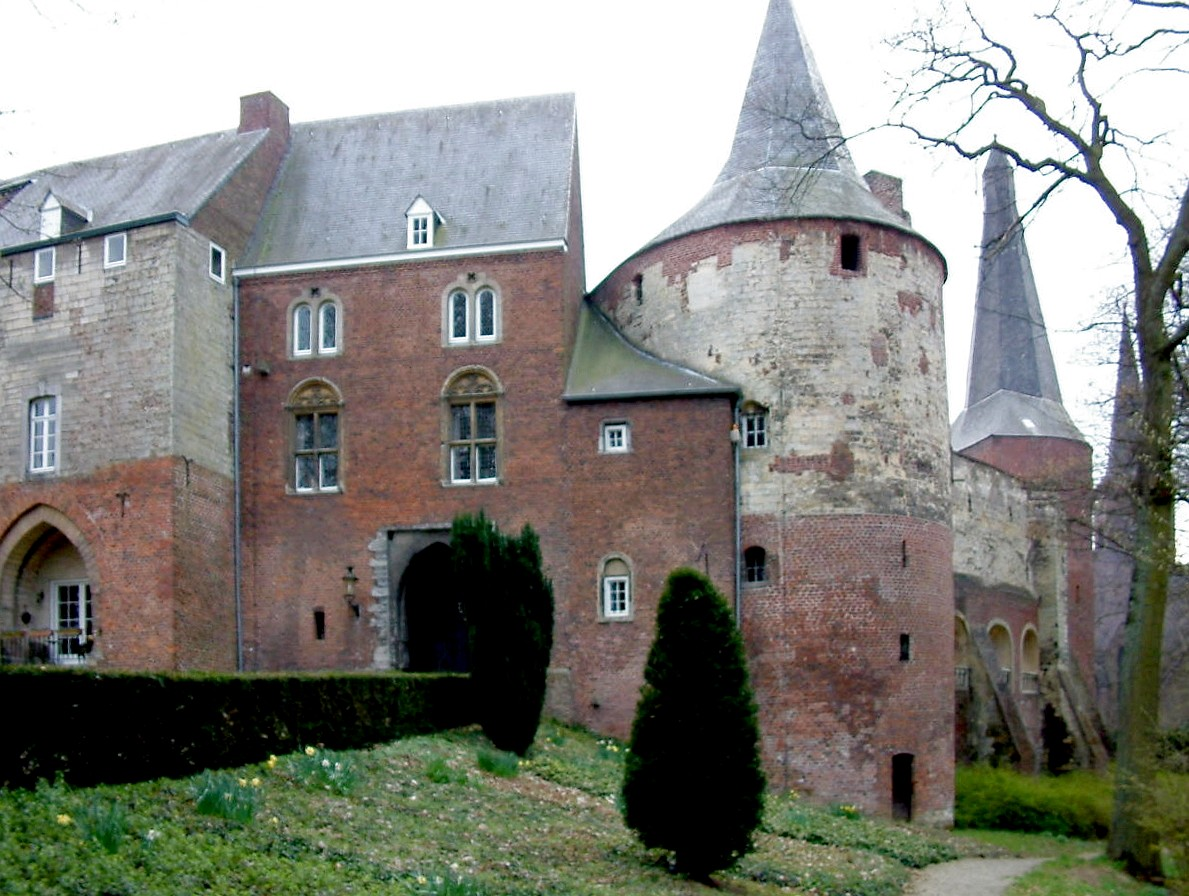
- Horn Castle

- Flag Coat of arms

- Location in the Netherlands Location in the province of Limburg in the Netherlands
- Coordinates: 51°13′N 5°57′E
- Country: Netherlands
- Province: Limburg
- Municipality: Leudal

Area
  - Total: 9.30 km^{2} (3.59 sq mi)
- Elevation: 25 m (82 ft)

Population (2021)
  - Total: 3,730
  - Density: 401/km^{2} (1,040/sq mi)
- Time zone: UTC+1 (CET)
  - Summer (DST): UTC+2 (CEST)
- Postal code: 6085
- Dialing code: 0475
- Major roads: N273, N280

Horn (Dutch pronunciation: [ɦɔrn]; Limburgish: Häör) is a village in the Dutch province of Limburg. It is a part of the municipality of Leudal, and lies about 5 km northwest of Roermond.

== History ==
The village was first mentioned in 1102 as "Engelbertus de Hurne", and means "corner". Horn developed in the Early Middle Ages along the Maas. In 1102, a Heer of Horn existed. In 1450, it became the capital of the County of Horn. In 1614, Horn became part of the Prince-Bishopric of Liège. In 1839, it became part of the Kingdom of the Netherlands.

Horn Castle is located on an artificially enlarged hill surrounded by a dry moat. In the 13th century an irregular square motte-and-bailey castle with four corner towers was built, probably on the site of an earlier castle. In the 15th century, the castle was enlarged. Two corner towers were demolished and a new tower was built above the gate. In 1615, it was damaged by war. During the 18th century, the castle started to deteriorate and was used as a farm. In 1798, it was restored and extended. It was lightly damaged by war in 1945, and the living quarters suffered a fire in 1948. Between 1954 and 1957, the castle was restored by Pierre Cuypers jr., an architect.

The Catholic St Martinus Church is a three aisled church with detached tower. It was built between 1936 and 1937 to replace the church of 1838. The tower was blown up in 1944, and rebuilt shortly after.

Horn was home to 797 people in 1840. It was a separate municipality until 1991, when it was merged with Haelen. In 2007, it became part of the municipality of Leudal.

== Notable people ==
- Leo Beulen (1960) Commander of the Royal Netherlands Army
- Wilhelmus Demarteau (1917–2012) Bishop emeritus of Diocese of Banjarmasin
- Maurice Graef (1969) footballer
- Teunkie van der Sluijs (1981) theatre director
- Steve Wijler (1996) archer

== Gallery ==
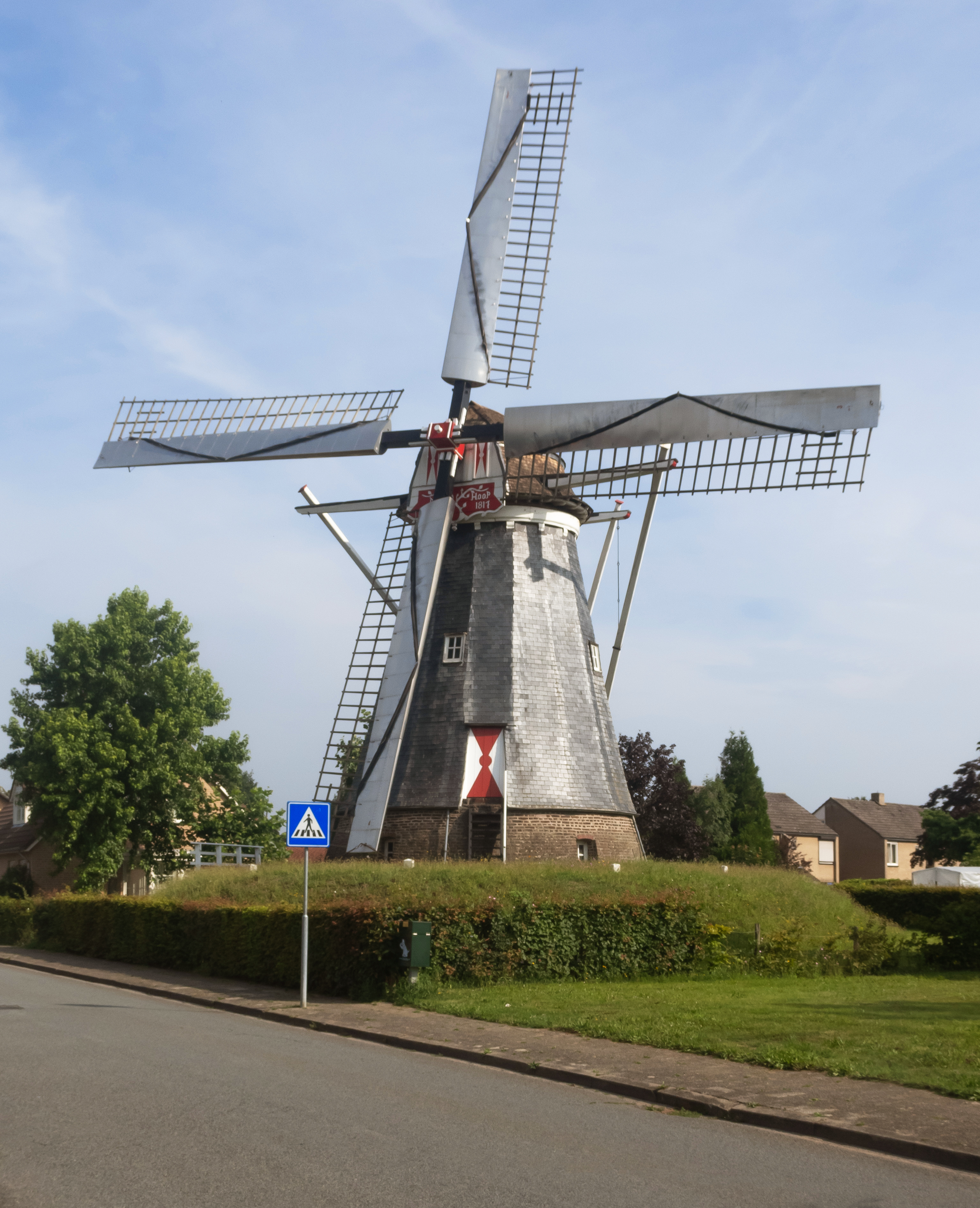
Horn, windmill: molen de Hoop

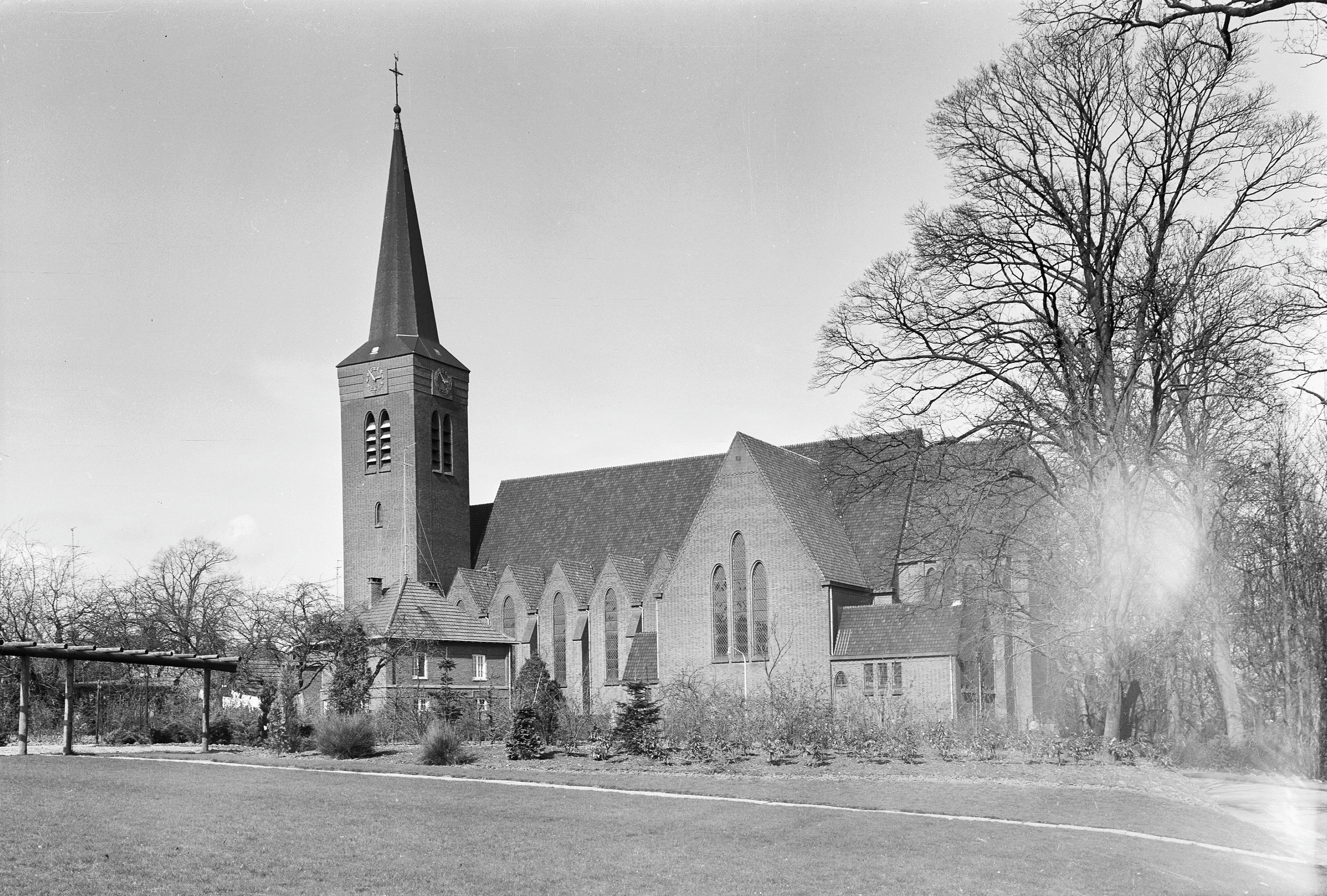
St Martinus Church (1967)

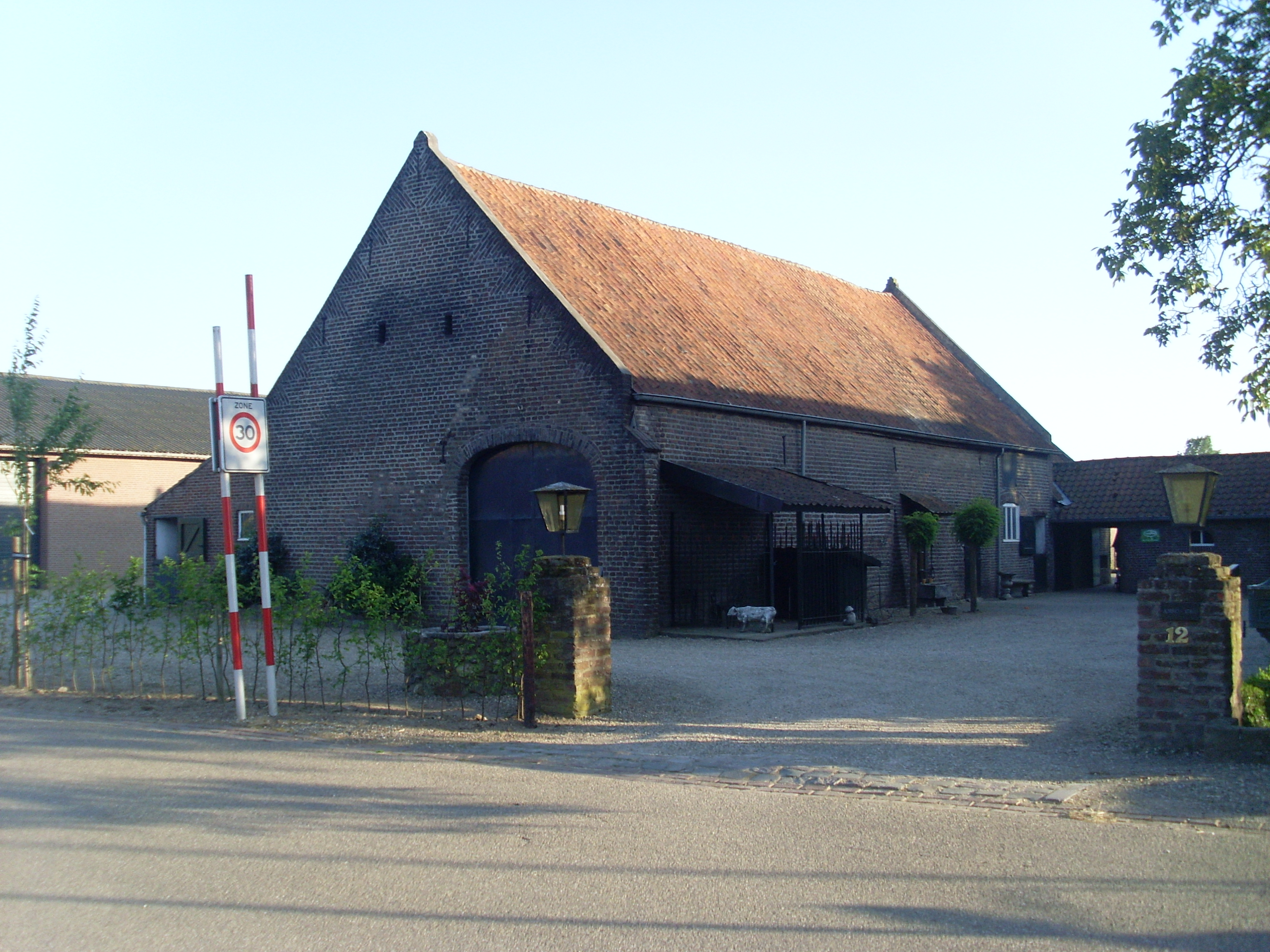
Farm in Horn
