= Tyrick Bodak =

Dutch-Curaçaoan footballer (born 2002)

Personal information
- Full name: Tyrick Jeremy Bodak
- Date of birth: 15 May 2002 (age 24)
- Place of birth: Almere, Netherlands
- Height: 1.90 m (6 ft 3 in)
- Position: Goalkeeper

Team information
- Current team: Vitesse
- Number: 25

Youth career
- 2009–2014: BAS
- 2014–2018: SV Colmschate '33
- 2018–2019: De Graafschap
- 2019–2021: PSV

Senior career*
| Years | Team | Apps | (Gls) |
| 2021–2023 | Jong PSV | 0 | (0) |
| 2023–2024 | Cambuur | 0 | (0) |
| 2024–2026 | Telstar | 0 | (0) |
| 2026– | Vitesse | 0 | (0) |

International career^{‡}
| 2019 | Curaçao U17 | 4 | (0) |
| 2020 | Curaçao U20 | 3 | (0) |
| 2021– | Curaçao | 4 | (0) |
- * Club domestic league appearances and goals as of 7 August 2026 ‡ National team caps and goals as of 21 November 2023

Tyrick Jeremy Bodak (born 15 May 2002) is a professional footballer who plays as a goalkeeper for Eerste Divisie club Vitesse. Born in the Netherlands, he plays for the Curaçao national team.

== Club career ==
Bodak came through the youth system at De Graafschap and joined PSV in June 2019. He signed his first professional contract on 11 August 2020. In June 2023, he moved to Cambuur.

In 2024, Bodak joined Telstar in the Eerste Divisie, where he was the third-choice goalkeeper behind Ronald Koeman Jr. and Joey Houweling. He was part of the squad that won promotion to the Eredivisie through the play-offs in the 2024–25 season—the club's first top-flight return in 47 years—albeit without making an appearance. Following promotion he remained third-choice, with Daan Reiziger arriving to back up Koeman Jr.

On 4 August 2026, Bodak joined Eerste Divisie club Vitesse on a one-year contract.

== International career ==
Bodak has represented Curaçao at youth level. In July 2021, he was named in Curaçao's squad for the 2021 CONCACAF Gold Cup. However, they were forced to withdraw from the tournament due to high number of COVID-19 positive cases across the staff and players.

Bodak made his international debut on 9 October 2021 in a 2–1 defeat to New Zealand. In June 2025, he was named in the squad for the 2025 CONCACAF Gold Cup.

In May 2026, he was named in Curaçao's squad for the 2026 FIFA World Cup, the country's first-ever appearance at the tournament.

== Career statistics ==
=== Club ===
As of 7 August 2026

Appearances and goals by club, season and competition
| Club | Season | League | | | National cup | | Other | | Total | |
| Club | Season | Division | Apps | Goals | Apps | Goals | Apps | Goals | Apps | Goals |
|---|---|---|---|---|---|---|---|---|---|---|
| Jong PSV | 2021–22 | Eerste Divisie | 0 | 0 | — | | — | | 0 | 0 |
| Jong PSV | 2022–23 | Eerste Divisie | 0 | 0 | — | | — | | 0 | 0 |
| Jong PSV | Total | | 0 | 0 | 0 | 0 | 0 | 0 | 0 | 0 |
| Cambuur | 2023–24 | Eerste Divisie | 0 | 0 | 0 | 0 | — | | 0 | 0 |
| Telstar | 2024–25 | Eerste Divisie | 0 | 0 | 0 | 0 | 0 | 0 | 0 | 0 |
| Telstar | 2025–26 | Eredivisie | 0 | 0 | 0 | 0 | — | | 0 | 0 |
| Telstar | Total | | 0 | 0 | 0 | 0 | 0 | 0 | 0 | 0 |
| Vitesse | 2026–27 | Eerste Divisie | 0 | 0 | 0 | 0 | — | | 0 | 0 |
| Career total | | | 0 | 0 | 0 | 0 | 0 | 0 | 0 | 0 |

=== International ===
As of match played 21 November 2023

Appearances and goals by national team and year
| National team | Year | Apps | Goals |
|---|---|---|---|
| Curaçao | 2021 | 1 | 0 |
| Curaçao | 2022 | 2 | 0 |
| Curaçao | 2023 | 1 | 0 |
| Curaçao | 2024 | 0 | 0 |
| Curaçao | 2025 | 0 | 0 |
| Curaçao | 2026 | 0 | 0 |
| Total | | 4 | 0 |
