= Haelen =

Haelen Hale (Limburgish)
- Village
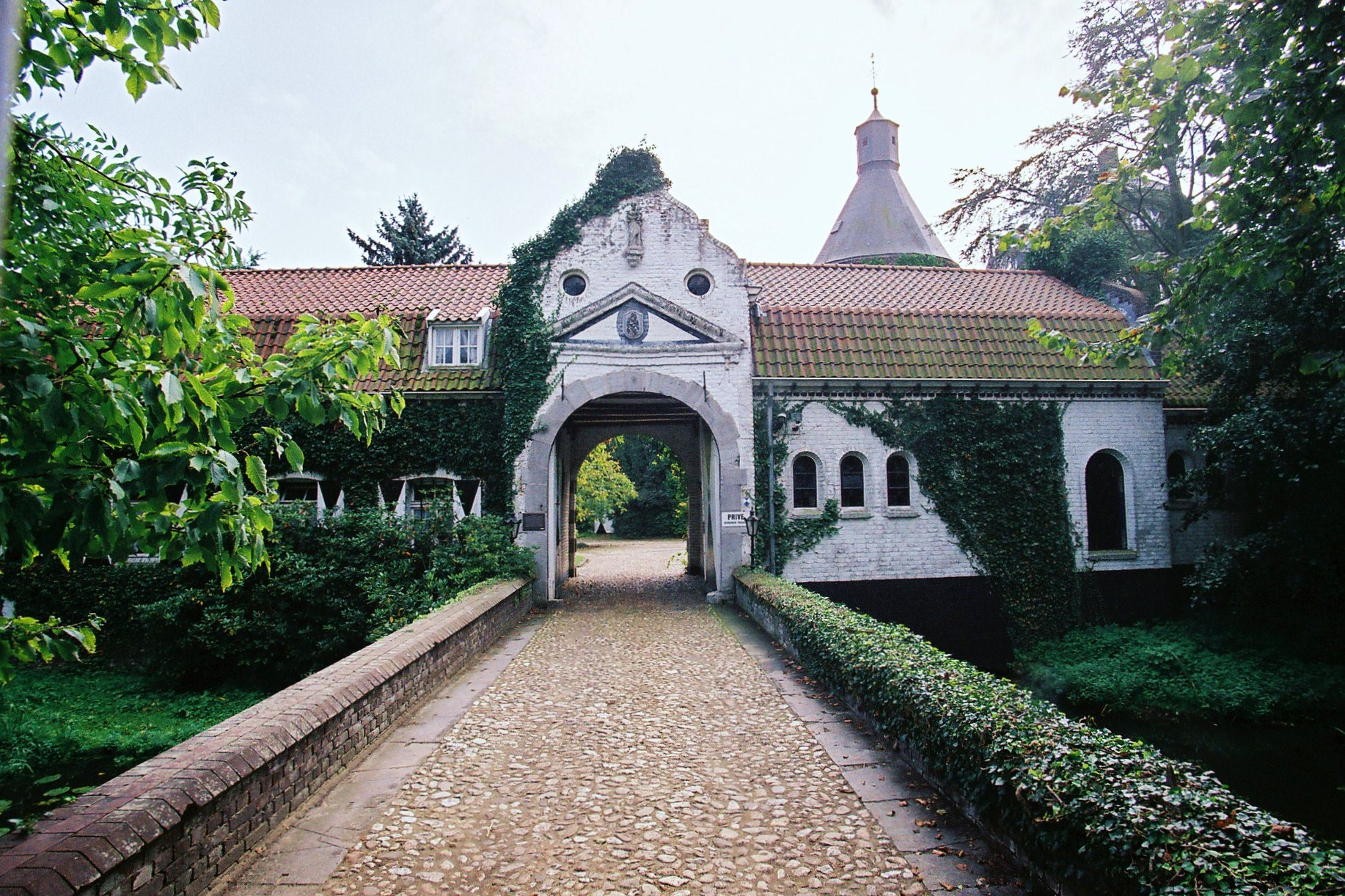
- Aldeghoor castle

- Location in the Netherlands Location in the province of Limburg in the Netherlands
- Coordinates: 51°14′N 5°57′E
- Country: Netherlands
- Province: Limburg
- Municipality: Leudal

Area
  - Total: 11.31 km^{2} (4.37 sq mi)
- Elevation: 28 m (92 ft)

Population (2021)
  - Total: 4,395
  - Density: 388.6/km^{2} (1,006/sq mi)
- Time zone: UTC+1 (CET)
  - Summer (DST): UTC+2 (CEST)
- Postal code: 6080-6081
- Dialing code: 0475
- Major roads: N273, N279

Haelen (Dutch: [ˈɦaːlə(n)]; Limburgish: Hale) is a town in the south-eastern Netherlands.

== History ==
The village was first mentioned in 1224 as "Gregorio (de) Haele", and means "bend of the highland". Haelen developed along the Haelense Beek. It used to belong to the County of Horne, and later became part of the Prince-Bishopric of Liège. In 1679, it became an independent heerlijkheid.

Aldengoor Castle was first mentioned in 1212. One tower from 15th century remains, the other three towers were destroyed during a siege in 1598 by the Dutch Republic. During the 17th and 18th century, it was enlarged with two wings. In 1903, it was used as a monastery. In 1977, a museum was housed in the castle, and it has become private property since 1996. In 2006, a bed and breakfast opened in the castle.

The Catholic St Lambertus Church is a three aisled church built between 1953 and 1955 to replace the church which was destroyed in 1944.

Haelen was home to 374 people in 1840. Until it became a part of Leudal on 1 January 2007 Haelen was a separate municipality, and included the villages of Buggenum, Horn, and Nunhem.

== Gallery ==
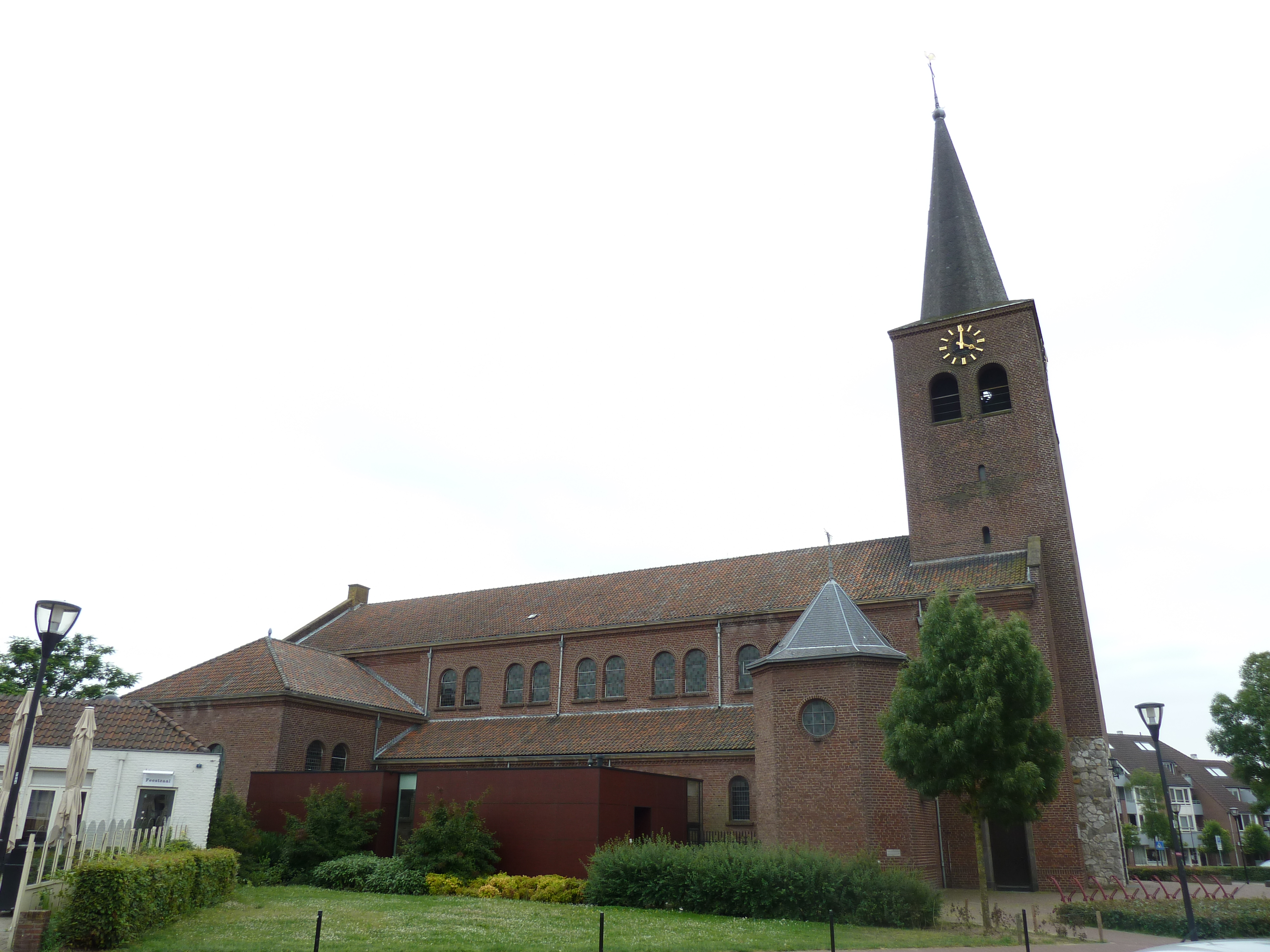
St Lambertus Church

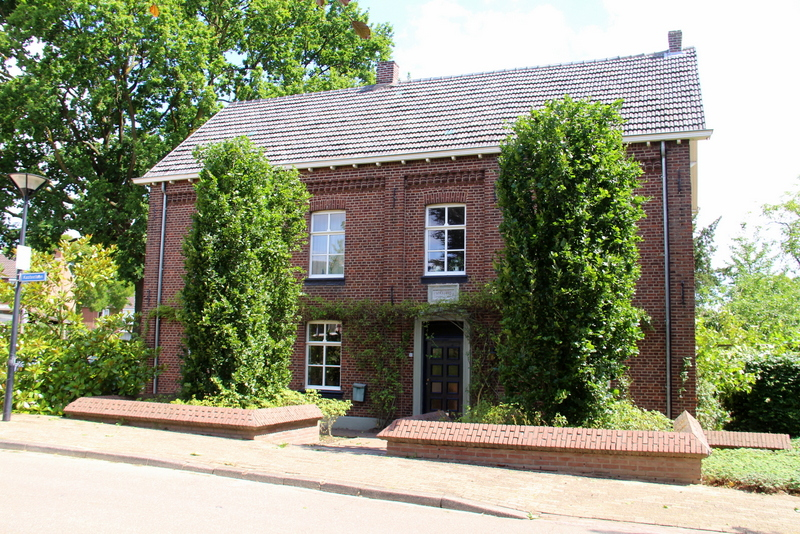
House in Haelen

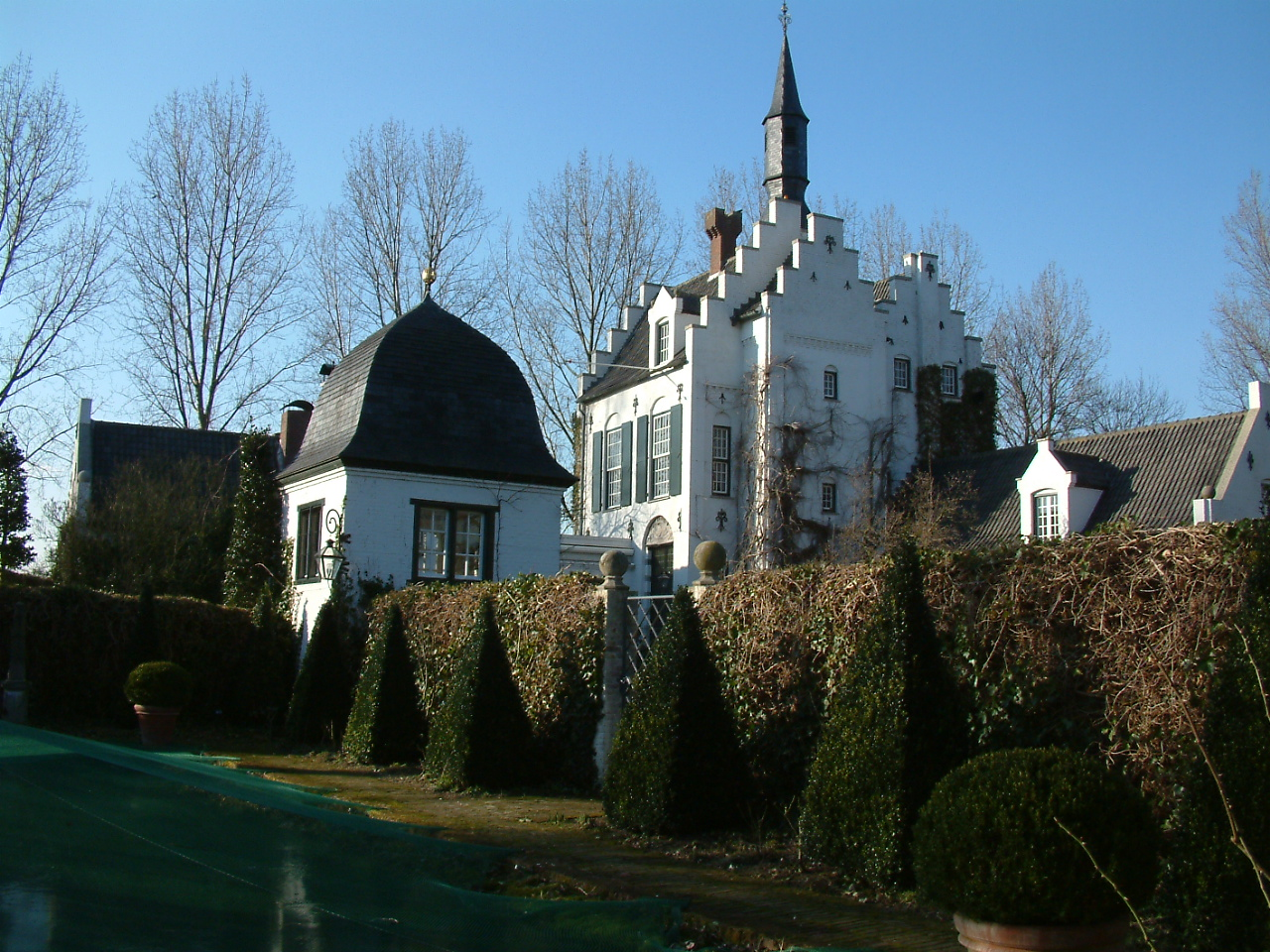
Groot Buggenum

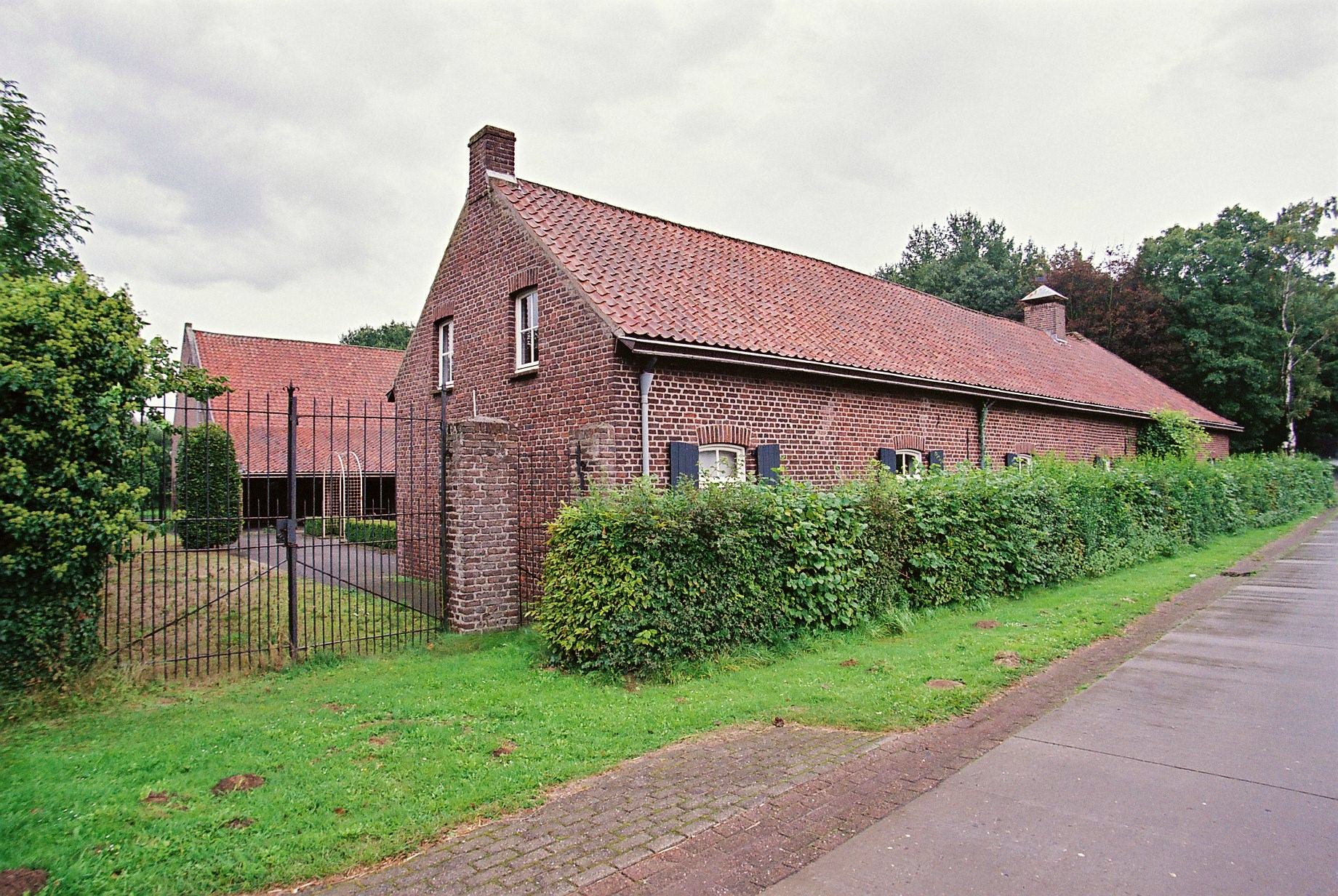
Farm in Haelen
