= 1990–91 Eredivisie =

35th season of the Eredivisie

Eredivisie
- Season: 1990–91
- Champions: PSV (12th title)
- Promoted: SVV sc Heerenveen
- Relegated: sc Heerenveen; NEC
- European Cup: PSV
- Cup Winners' Cup: Feyenoord
- UEFA Cup: Ajax; FC Groningen; FC Utrecht
- Goals: 830
- Average goals/game: 2.71
- Top goalscorer: (Brazil) Romário PSV (Netherlands) Dennis Bergkamp Ajax 25 goals

The Dutch Eredivisie in the 1990–91 season was contested by 18 teams. PSV won the championship.

== League standings ==
| Pos | Team | Pld | W | D | L | GF | GA | GD | Pts | Qualification or relegation |
|---|---|---|---|---|---|---|---|---|---|---|
| 1 | PSV (C) | 34 | 23 | 7 | 4 | 84 | 28 | +56 | 53 | Qualification to European Cup first round |
| 2 | Ajax | 34 | 22 | 9 | 3 | 75 | 21 | +54 | 53 | Qualification to UEFA Cup first round |
| 3 | FC Groningen | 34 | 18 | 10 | 6 | 62 | 38 | +24 | 46 | Qualification to UEFA Cup first round |
| 4 | FC Utrecht | 34 | 16 | 10 | 8 | 42 | 29 | +13 | 42 | Qualification to UEFA Cup first round |
| 5 | Vitesse Arnhem | 34 | 11 | 15 | 8 | 39 | 32 | +7 | 37 | |
| 6 | FC Twente | 34 | 13 | 10 | 11 | 58 | 48 | +10 | 36 | |
| 7 | RKC | 34 | 11 | 13 | 10 | 51 | 49 | +2 | 35 | |
| 8 | Feyenoord (Note: Winners of the KNVB Cup) | 34 | 8 | 16 | 10 | 39 | 40 | −1 | 32 | Qualification to Cup Winners' Cup first round |
| 9 | FC Volendam | 34 | 10 | 12 | 12 | 37 | 45 | −8 | 32 | |
| 10 | Roda JC | 34 | 12 | 7 | 15 | 40 | 53 | −13 | 31 | |
| 11 | Willem II | 34 | 13 | 4 | 17 | 53 | 50 | +3 | 30 | |
| 12 | Fortuna Sittard | 34 | 9 | 12 | 13 | 33 | 47 | −14 | 30 | |
| 13 | Sparta | 34 | 7 | 15 | 12 | 40 | 57 | −17 | 29 | |
| 14 | FC Den Haag | 34 | 10 | 8 | 16 | 40 | 60 | −20 | 28 | |
| 15 | MVV | 34 | 9 | 9 | 16 | 38 | 56 | −18 | 27 | |
| 16 | SVV | 34 | 8 | 8 | 18 | 31 | 52 | −21 | 24 | Qualification to Relegation play-offs (Note: SVV would remain in the eredivisie after winning the promotion/relegation play-offs. Next season, they would merge with Dordrecht '90 into SVV/Dordrecht'90.) |
| 17 | sc Heerenveen (R) | 34 | 9 | 6 | 19 | 41 | 63 | −22 | 24 | Relegation to Eerste Divisie |
| 18 | NEC (R) | 34 | 6 | 11 | 17 | 27 | 62 | −35 | 23 | Relegation to Eerste Divisie |

Source: rsssf.com
(C) Champions; (R) Relegated

== Results ==
| Home \ Away | AJA | FEY | FOR | GRO | DHA | HEE | MVV | NEC | PSV | RKC | RJC | SPA | SVV | TWE | UTR | VIT | VOL | WIL |
|---|---|---|---|---|---|---|---|---|---|---|---|---|---|---|---|---|---|---|
| Ajax | — | 2–0 | 2–0 | 1–1 | 5–0 | 4–0 | 1–0 | 7–0 | 3–1 | 0–0 | 4–1 | 1–0 | 2–0 | 1–1 | 1–1 | 3–0 | 3–1 | 3–1 |
| Feyenoord | 0–4 | — | 0–0 | 2–0 | 0–2 | 1–1 | 6–0 | 0–0 | 1–1 | 3–0 | 2–1 | 4–3 | 1–1 | 2–2 | 0–0 | 0–0 | 3–0 | 0–1 |
| Fortuna Sittard | 1–1 | 3–2 | — | 0–0 | 3–1 | 1–0 | 1–1 | 3–1 | 0–3 | 0–2 | 0–1 | 1–1 | 1–0 | 0–0 | 0–2 | 0–4 | 0–0 | 2–0 |
| FC Groningen | 1–2 | 1–1 | 3–1 | — | 2–0 | 3–0 | 2–1 | 2–1 | 4–1 | 2–1 | 3–1 | 4–0 | 2–2 | 4–0 | 2–2 | 2–0 | 1–0 | 4–1 |
| FC Den Haag | 0–1 | 0–2 | 0–0 | 1–2 | — | 3–2 | 5–1 | 1–1 | 3–0 | 2–2 | 3–1 | 3–0 | 1–1 | 1–5 | 3–1 | 1–1 | 1–3 | 1–0 |
| Heerenveen | 1–4 | 0–0 | 1–2 | 4–2 | 3–0 | — | 1–0 | 1–1 | 0–3 | 4–1 | 1–2 | 2–1 | 0–1 | 0–1 | 1–0 | 2–2 | 1–3 | 2–1 |
| MVV | 1–4 | 0–2 | 1–1 | 1–0 | 1–0 | 2–0 | — | 1–2 | 3–3 | 0–1 | 1–2 | 0–0 | 2–0 | 2–1 | 1–1 | 2–0 | 1–1 | 3–1 |
| NEC | 0–5 | 2–1 | 0–2 | 0–3 | 0–0 | 2–1 | 2–1 | — | 1–1 | 0–0 | 1–2 | 3–1 | 2–1 | 1–3 | 1–1 | 0–2 | 1–2 | 0–2 |
| PSV Eindhoven | 4–1 | 6–0 | 5–1 | 1–1 | 4–0 | 2–0 | 3–0 | 1–0 | — | 3–1 | 3–0 | 6–1 | 3–2 | 3–1 | 5–0 | 1–1 | 3–0 | 3–0 |
| RKC | 1–1 | 1–0 | 1–1 | 1–1 | 1–2 | 5–2 | 3–2 | 3–0 | 0–3 | — | 4–1 | 4–2 | 4–1 | 6–6 | 1–0 | 1–1 | 1–1 | 2–0 |
| Roda | 0–0 | 0–0 | 1–1 | 0–0 | 5–1 | 1–0 | 1–0 | 2–2 | 1–3 | 1–0 | — | 2–2 | 1–0 | 1–2 | 1–2 | 1–2 | 2–1 | 1–0 |
| Sparta Rotterdam | 0–0 | 1–1 | 2–2 | 1–1 | 0–0 | 2–1 | 0–0 | 3–1 | 1–0 | 0–0 | 1–1 | — | 5–3 | 1–3 | 4–1 | 1–1 | 1–2 | 2–0 |
| SVV | 1–0 | 0–0 | 2–0 | 0–1 | 4–2 | 1–2 | 1–4 | 1–0 | 0–1 | 0–0 | 3–1 | 0–0 | — | 1–1 | 1–0 | 1–2 | 1–0 | 0–0 |
| Twente | 0–1 | 1–1 | 1–0 | 4–2 | 2–1 | 3–3 | 4–1 | 5–0 | 0–2 | 1–1 | 4–1 | 0–1 | 2–1 | — | 1–1 | 0–2 | 0–0 | 2–0 |
| Utrecht | 0–0 | 2–0 | 2–0 | 4–0 | 0–0 | 1–2 | 4–1 | 2–0 | 1–1 | 2–0 | 2–1 | 2–0 | 1–0 | 1–0 | — | 1–1 | 1–0 | 1–0 |
| Vitesse | 1–3 | 0–0 | 2–3 | 1–2 | 2–0 | 2–0 | 1–1 | 0–0 | 1–1 | 1–1 | 1–3 | 0–0 | 3–0 | 1–0 | 1–0 | — | 0–0 | 2–0 |
| Volendam | 0–3 | 2–2 | 2–1 | 2–2 | 0–2 | 1–1 | 2–2 | 0–0 | 0–2 | 2–0 | 2–0 | 2–2 | 2–1 | 3–1 | 0–1 | 2–1 | — | 0–0 |
| Willem II | 3–2 | 3–2 | 3–2 | 1–2 | 5–0 | 5–2 | 0–1 | 2–2 | 0–2 | 4–2 | 2–0 | 6–1 | 6–0 | 2–1 | 0–2 | 0–0 | 4–1 | — |

Legend: Blue = home team win; Yellow = draw; Red = away team win.

== Promotion/relegation play-offs ==
The number 16 of the Eredivisie would play against relegation against the runners-up of the promotion/relegation play-offs of the Eerste Divisie. The Eerste Divisie league champions and winner of the play-offs would replace the numbers 17 and 18 of this league directly.

| Team 1 | Agg. | Team 2 | 1st leg | 2nd leg |
|---|---|---|---|---|
| NAC | 2-5 | SVV | 1-4 | 1-1 |

SVV: remain in Eredivisie and merge with Dordrecht '90
NAC: remain in Eerste Divisie

== Attendances ==
| No. | Club | Average | Change | Highest |
|---|---|---|---|---|
| 1 | PSV | 24,853 | 2,1% | 28,500 |
| 2 | AFC Ajax | 22,263 | 39,0% | 52,500 |
| 3 | Feyenoord | 17,689 | 37,0% | 46,000 |
| 4 | FC Groningen | 14,391 | 63,1% | 18,500 |
| 5 | sc Heerenveen | 8,900 | 134,5% | 12,500 |
| 6 | FC Utrecht | 8,129 | 2,1% | 15,000 |
| 7 | Willem II | 7,053 | -6,4% | 12,000 |
| 8 | SBV Vitesse | 6,658 | -30,6% | 12,500 |
| 9 | FC Twente | 6,309 | 12,7% | 11,600 |
| 10 | FC Den Haag | 6,204 | -11,1% | 15,900 |
| 11 | Fortuna Sittard | 4,865 | -11,9% | 10,000 |
| 12 | NEC | 4,847 | -23,1% | 14,000 |
| 13 | Roda JC | 4,765 | -39,3% | 12,000 |
| 14 | FC Volendam | 4,718 | -9,8% | 12,000 |
| 15 | Sparta | 4,618 | -3,1% | 15,000 |
| 16 | MVV Maastricht | 4,491 | -15,7% | 9,000 |
| 17 | SV SVV | 4,068 | 2,3% | 27,000 |
| 18 | RKC | 3,119 | -19,6% | 6,200 |

== See also ==
- 1990–91 Eerste Divisie
- 1990–91 KNVB Cup
