= SC Telstar =

Association football club in IJmuiden, Netherlands

Telstar
- Full name: Sportclub Telstar
- Nickname: De Witte Leeuwen (The White Lions)
- Founded: 17 July 1963; 63 years ago
- Stadium: BUKO Stadion
- Capacity: 6,000
- Chairman: Lex de Jager
- Head coach: Henk Brugge
- League: Eredivisie
- 2025–26: Eredivisie, 14th of 18
- Website: sctelstar.nl
Home colours	Away colours

Sportclub Telstar (Dutch pronunciation: [ˈspɔrtklʏp ˈtɛlstɑr]), commonly known as Telstar, is a Dutch professional football club based in Velsen-Zuid, North Holland. Nicknamed the Witte Leeuwen, or White Lions, the club competes in the Eredivisie, the top tier of the Dutch football league system. It returned to the top flight in 2025 after 47 years in the Eerste Divisie.

Telstar was founded on 17 July 1963, when the professional sections of the local clubs VSV and Stormvogels merged, and was named after the communications satellite Telstar 1. The club won promotion to the Eredivisie in its first season and stayed there until 1978, with a best finish of sixth in the 1973–74 season. It spent the following 47 years in the Eerste Divisie before winning the 2025 promotion play-offs under head coach Anthony Correia. Telstar has reached the semi-finals of the KNVB Cup twice, in 1992 and 2026.

Telstar plays its home matches at Sportpark Schoonenberg, known as the BUKO Stadion for sponsorship reasons, which has held about 6,000 spectators since its renovation in 2025. The players walk out to the Tornados' instrumental "Telstar", and the ground has a manual scoreboard on which fish baskets are hoisted after each goal.

== History ==
=== Formation and Eredivisie years (1963–1978) ===
VSV from Velsen and Stormvogels from IJmuiden both joined the Eerste Divisie in 1957 and were relegated to the Tweede Divisie in 1962. VSV had won the KNVB Cup in 1938, beating AGOVV 4–1 in the final. It returned to the Eerste Divisie in 1963. Both clubs were in financial difficulty, and on 17 July 1963 their professional sections merged. The new club took VSV's place in the Eerste Divisie, while VSV and Stormvogels continued as separate amateur clubs. It was named Telstar after the communications satellite Telstar 1, launched in 1962, which also appears on the club crest.

League performance of Telstar and its predecessors

Telstar finished second in the 1963–64 season and won promotion to the Eredivisie in its first year. The club's best period came in the mid-1970s. It finished sixth in the 1973–74 season, seventh in the 1974–75 season and ninth in the 1975–76 season. Home matches against Ajax and Feyenoord sold out in that decade, with about 20,000 spectators on the terraces, while other league matches drew around 8,000.

After finishing 14th in the 1976–77 season, Telstar came last in the 1977–78 season with 14 points from 34 matches. Its relegation was confirmed five matches before the end of the season. The squad that season included Louis van Gaal, who started the club's final Eredivisie match on 30 April 1978. Libero Henk Medik scored the only goal in a win over FC Volendam, which remained Telstar's last top-flight goal for 47 years.

=== Eerste Divisie (1978–2025) ===
Telstar reached the promotion play-offs in the 1978–79 season after finishing second in the third period. It beat Willem II 3–0 in its first play-off match but then lost five in a row. In the 1981–82 season, it finished fourth, four points behind champions Helmond Sport, and came last in its play-off group.

In the 1991–92 KNVB Cup, Telstar reached the semi-finals for the first time. It knocked out Elinkwijk, RKC Waalwijk, FC Eindhoven and HFC Haarlem, beating Haarlem 4–1 in the quarter-final on 1 March 1992. In the semi-final on 31 March, Roda JC won 3–0, scoring all three goals after Peter van der Zwaan was sent off for a second yellow card in the 60th minute.

Telstar finished fifth in the 1993–94 season, six points behind champions Dordrecht '90. It came second in its play-off group behind RKC Waalwijk. Play-off campaigns in the 2000–01 season and the 2004–05 season also ended in the group stage. In the 2001–02 KNVB Cup, the club reached the quarter-finals, where it lost 3–0 to Jong Ajax.

In 2001, Telstar merged with the amateur club Stormvogels and became Stormvogels Telstar. The merger was intended to strengthen the club's youth development, but few academy players reached the first team. In April 2008, the members voted to separate the professional and amateur sections again. The professional club reverted to the name Telstar on 1 July 2008 and began a partnership with AZ, moving its youth academy to Alkmaar. In the 2008–09 season, Telstar won the third period title but lost to MVV over two legs in the first round of the play-offs.

Under director Pieter de Waard, who left in 2023, Telstar built a reputation as a cult club with close ties to its community. Its initiatives included after-school care, jobs for people with disabilities and a Telstar perfume. Telstar became the first Dutch club to play in a rainbow shirt in support of inclusivity and diversity, an idea that came from talks with the John Blankenstein Foundation in 2017. On 15 October 2021, Telstar and FC Volendam both wore rainbow shirts in their derby, the first time two teams had done so in a Dutch professional match.

Under head coach Mike Snoei, Telstar finished sixth in the 2017–18 season with a squad that included Jerdy Schouten, Andrija Novakovich and Melvin Platje. It lost the play-off semi-final to De Graafschap 6–5 on aggregate after a 3–2 home win and a 4–2 defeat away. In the second round of the 2019–20 KNVB Cup, Telstar lost 4–3 at home to Ajax on 18 December 2019.

=== Return to the Eredivisie (2025–present) ===
Anthony Correia, a former defender who had played for Telstar for 15 years, became head coach in 2024. A year after finishing 17th, Telstar ended the 2024–25 season in seventh place with 61 points and reached the play-offs for the first time since 2017–18. It beat ADO Den Haag 2–0 at home in the first round. The return match in The Hague was abandoned in the closing minutes with Telstar leading 1–0, after ADO supporters threw toilet paper and fireworks onto the pitch, and Telstar went through to the semi-finals. After a goalless first leg away to FC Den Bosch, Telstar won the return match 2–1 after extra time, with Danny Bakker scoring the winner.

In the final, Telstar faced Willem II, which had finished 16th in the Eredivisie. The first leg in Velsen-Zuid ended 2–2 on 29 May 2025. In the second leg at the Koning Willem II Stadion in Tilburg on 1 June, Telstar won 3–1 through two goals from Mees Kaandorp and one from Youssef El Kachati. The result returned the club to the Eredivisie for the first time since 1978.

Telstar lost its first two Eredivisie matches without scoring, away to Ajax and at home to PEC Zwolle. On 23 August 2025, Soufiane Hetli scored the club's first Eredivisie goal in 17,282 days in a 2–2 home draw with FC Volendam. A week later, Telstar won 2–0 away at PSV, a result NH Nieuws described as the biggest upset of the season so far.

In the 2025–26 KNVB Cup, Telstar beat FC Lisse, Hoek and Almere City before knocking out the holders Go Ahead Eagles 2–1 at home in the quarter-final on 5 February 2026. It was the club's first cup semi-final in 34 years. In the semi-final on 4 March, AZ won 2–1 at the AFAS Stadion after two Telstar own goals early in the second half.

Telstar was 17th in the league at the time of the semi-final. It won six of its last ten league matches, a total bettered only by PSV and FC Utrecht in that period, according to Voetbal International. On the final day, 17 May 2026, a draw away to direct rivals FC Volendam would have been enough to avoid the relegation play-offs. Goalkeeper Ronald Koeman Jr. scored an 89th-minute penalty to give Telstar a 2–1 win, which sent Volendam into the play-offs. Telstar finished 14th with 37 points, five points above the play-off place. Correia left at the end of the season to become head coach of FC Utrecht and was succeeded by Henk Brugge, previously an assistant coach at SC Heerenveen.

== Stadium ==
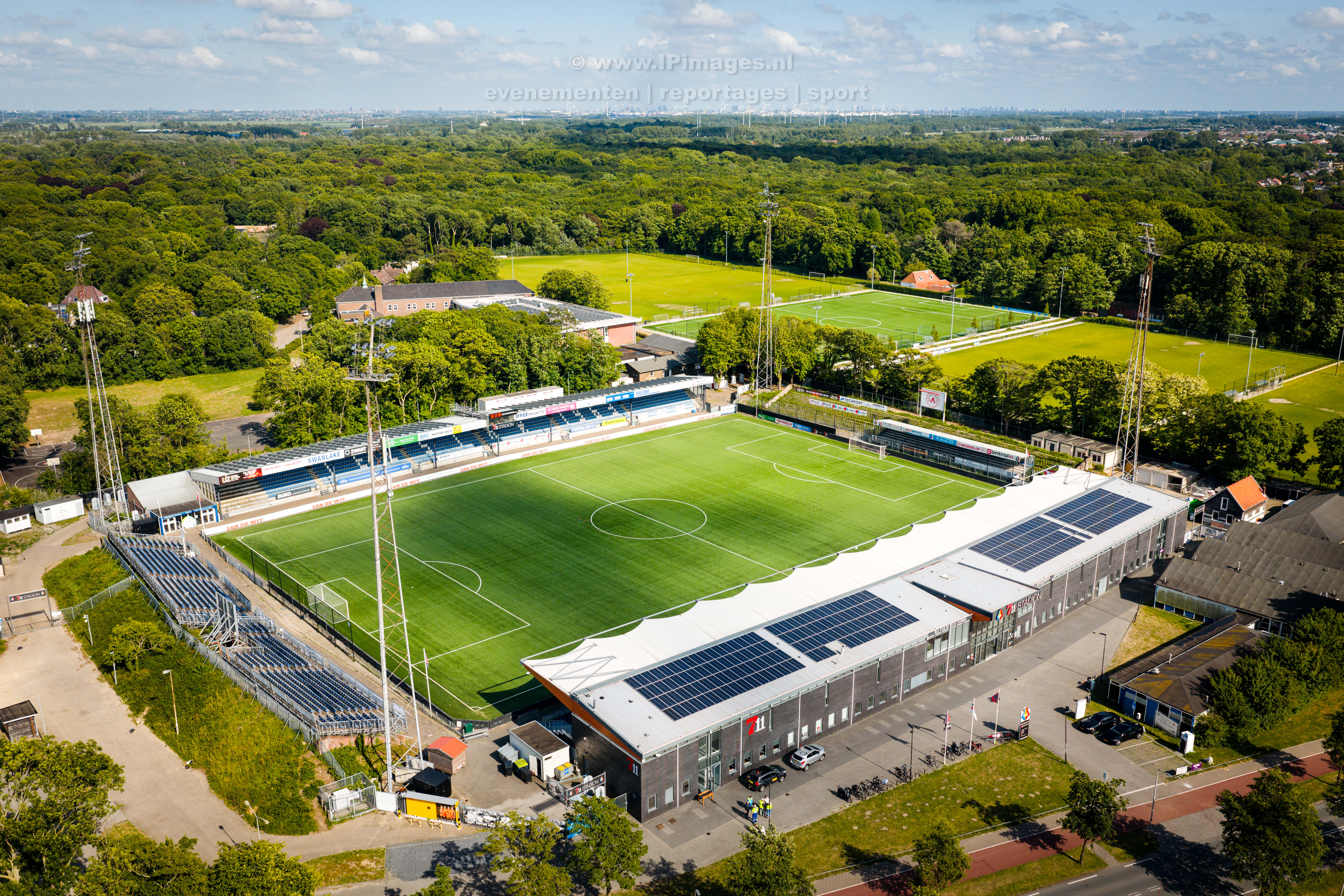
Sportpark Schoonenberg, home of Telstar since its foundation

Telstar plays its home matches at Sportpark Schoonenberg in Velsen-Zuid, which opened on 27 March 1948. A new main stand was built on the west side in 2009, followed by a new south stand in 2010. The ground has carried several sponsored names, including Tata Steel Stadion from 2009 to 2014 and Rabobank IJmond Stadion from 2016 to 2020. It was called the BUKO Stadion from 2021 to 2023 and the 711 Stadion from 2023 to 2025. A ban on gambling sponsorship from 1 July 2025 ended the deal with 711, and BUKO returned as name sponsor on a contract until the summer of 2027.

Before promotion, the stadium had an artificial pitch. After Telstar won promotion in 2025, the artificial turf was replaced with natural grass. The uncovered north stand and the away section were demolished. They were replaced by a new north stand with 2,000 seats and a semi-permanent away section for 400 supporters, which raised the capacity to about 6,000. The renovated ground hosted Telstar's first home Eredivisie match in 47 years on 15 August 2025, a 2–0 defeat to PEC Zwolle in front of a sell-out crowd.

Telstar's players walk out to "Telstar" by the Tornados, a reference to the satellite the club is named after. After home goals, the stadium plays Scooter's "How Much Is the Fish?", which stadium announcer Robert Sant called a playful nod to the club. The ground also has a manual scoreboard on which a volunteer hoists fish baskets into the air after each goal. After a storm destroyed the wooden basket scoreboard in the spring of 2019, the club used an electronic board until a steel basket scoreboard was installed that October. The baskets were put back after the 2025 renovation.

== Honours ==
- Eerste Divisie
  - Runners-up: 1963–64
  - Period title: 2008–09
- Eredivisie promotion play-offs
  - Winners: 2025

== Club names ==
- 1963–2001: Telstar
- 2001–2008: Stormvogels Telstar
- 2008–present: Telstar

== Results ==
Below is a table with Telstar's domestic results since 1963.

Domestic Results since 1963
Domestic league	League result	Qualification to	KNVB Cup season	Cup result
2025–26 Eredivisie	14th	–	2025–26	semi-finals
2024–25 Eerste Divisie	7th	Eredivisie (winning promotion/releg. play-offs)	2024–25	second round
2023–24 Eerste Divisie	17th	–	2023–24	first round
2022–23 Eerste Divisie	9th	–	2022–23	second round
2021–22 Eerste Divisie	19th	–	2021–22	third round
2020–21 Eerste Divisie	13th	–	2020–21	first round
2019–20 Eerste Divisie	10th	–	2019–20	second round
2018–19 Eerste Divisie	15th	–	2018–19	first round
2017–18 Eerste Divisie	6th	promotion/relegation play-off: no promotion	2017–18	first round
2016–17 Eerste Divisie	16th	–	2016–17	second round
2015–16 Eerste Divisie	12th	–	2015–16	third round
2014–15 Eerste Divisie	15th	–	2014–15	second round
2013–14 Eerste Divisie	15th	–	2013–14	second round
2012–13 Eerste Divisie	14th	–	2012–13	third round
2011–12 Eerste Divisie	15th	–	2011–12	second round
2010–11 Eerste Divisie	14th	–	2010–11	round of 16
2009–10 Eerste Divisie	18th	–	2009–10	second round
2008–09 Eerste Divisie	17th	promotion/relegation play-off: no promotion	2008–09	third round
2007–08 Eerste Divisie	14th	–	2007–08	second round
2006–07 Eerste Divisie	10th	–	2006–07	third round
2005–06 Eerste Divisie	16th	–	2005–06	first round
2004–05 Eerste Divisie	7th	promotion/relegation play-off: no promotion	2004–05	third round
2003–04 Eerste Divisie	12th	–	2003–04	third round
2002–03 Eerste Divisie	12th	–	2002–03	round of 16
2001–02 Eerste Divisie	9th	–	2001–02	quarter-finals
2000–01 Eerste Divisie	7th	promotion/relegation play-off: no promotion	2000–01	group stage
1999–2000 Eerste Divisie	13th	–	1999–2000	second round
1998–99 Eerste Divisie	18th	–	1998–99	group stage
1997–98 Eerste Divisie	13th	–	1997–98	round of 16
1996–97 Eerste Divisie	16th	–	1996–97	second round
1995–96 Eerste Divisie	9th	–	1995–96	second round
1994–95 Eerste Divisie	11th	–	1994–95	second round
1993–94 Eerste Divisie	5th	promotion/relegation play-off: no promotion	1993–94	round of 16
1992–93 Eerste Divisie	18th	–	1992–93	third round
1991–92 Eerste Divisie	7th	–	1991–92	semi-finals
1990–91 Eerste Divisie	13th	–	1990–91	second round
1989–90 Eerste Divisie	18th	–	1989–90	second round
1988–89 Eerste Divisie	14th	–	1988–89	round of 16
1987–88 Eerste Divisie	13th	–	1987–88	first round
1986–87 Eerste Divisie	19th	–	1986–87	first round
1985–86 Eerste Divisie	6th	–	1985–86	round of 16
1984–85 Eerste Divisie	15th	–	1984–85	first round
1983–84 Eerste Divisie	5th	–	1983–84	first round
1982–83 Eerste Divisie	15th	–	1982–83	second round
1981–82 Eerste Divisie	4th	– (losing in promotion group)	1981–82	second round
1980–81 Eerste Divisie	11th	–	1980–81	second round
1979–80 Eerste Divisie	13th	–	1979–80	second round
1978–79 Eerste Divisie	10th	– (losing in promotion group)	1978–79	first round
1977–78 Eredivisie	18th	Eerste Divisie (relegation)	1977–78	second round
1976–77 Eredivisie	14th	–	1976–77	round of 16
1975–76 Eredivisie	9th	–	1975–76	round of 16
1974–75 Eredivisie	7th	–	1974–75	round of 16
1973–74 Eredivisie	6th	–	1973–74	round of 16
1972–73 Eredivisie	12th	–	1972–73	second round
1971–72 Eredivisie	11th	–	1971–72	first round
1970–71 Eredivisie	11th	–	1970–71	first round
1969–70 Eredivisie	14th	–	1969–70	round of 16
1968–69 Eredivisie	14th	–	1968–69	first round
1967–68 Eredivisie	11th	–	1967–68	round of 16
1966–67 Eredivisie	16th	–	1966–67	round of 16
1965–66 Eredivisie	13th	–	1965–66	quarter-finals
1964–65 Eredivisie	10th	–	1964–65	second round
1963–64 Eerste Divisie	2nd	Eredivisie (promotion)	1963–64	second round

== Players ==
=== First-team squad ===
As of 14 October 2026

Note: Flags indicate national team as defined under FIFA eligibility rules; some limited exceptions apply. Players may hold more than one non-FIFA nationality.

No.	Pos.	Nation	Player
1	GK	NED	Ronald Koeman Jr.
2	DF	NED	Jeff Hardeveld (captain)
3	DF	NED	Gerald Alders (on loan from Jong Ajax)
4	DF	FRA	Abdelnour Soualhia (on loan from AZ)
5	DF	NED	Prince Aning
6	MF	CUW	Isaiah Ahmed
7	FW	POR	Rui Mendes
8	FW	TUR	Emirhan Demircan (on loan from Utrecht)
9	FW	NED	Jelani Seedorf
10	MF	NED	Tyrone Owusu
11	FW	ISL	Nökkvi Þeyr Þórisson (on loan from Sparta Rotterdam)
13	GK	NED	Finn Mulder
14	MF	NED	Harrie Kuster

No.	Pos.	Nation	Player
15	DF	NED	Nigel Ogidi Nwankwo
16	DF	NED	Sem Valk
17	MF	NED	Nils Rossen
18	DF	NED	Gabi Caschili
19	FW	NED	Fabiano Rust
20	GK	NED	Daan Reiziger
21	FW	NED	Fofin Turay
23	MF	NED	Noach Shenkman
27	FW	NED	Patrick Brouwer
28	DF	SUR	Rojendro Oudsten
42	FW	CUW	Ar'jany Martha (on loan from Rotherham United)
43	DF	BEL	Marvin Peersman

=== Retired numbers ===
22: (Netherlands) Luciano van den Berg, defender (2004–2005)—posthumous honour.

== Former players ==
=== National team players ===
The following players were called up to represent their national teams in international football and received caps during their tenure with SC Telstar: (Note: The following is a consolidated list of clubs' IJVV Stormvogels, VSV and SC Telstar, as a result of the merger of the two prior aforementioned clubs in 1963.)

- **Afghanistan**
  - (Afghanistan) Hossein Zamani (2021)
- **Cape Verde**
  - (Cape Verde) Elso Brito (2017–2019)
- **Central African Republic**
  - (Central African Republic) Peter Guinari (2024)
- **Curaçao**
  - (Curaçao) Tyrick Bodak (2024–2026)
  - (Curaçao) Tyrese Noslin (2024–2026)
- **Guyana**
  - (Guyana) Terell Ondaan (2013; 2018–2019)
- **Indonesia**
  - (Indonesia) Stefano Lilipaly (2015–2017)
- **Luxembourg**
  - (Luxembourg) Gerson Rodrigues (2017)
- **Netherlands**
  - (Netherlands) Piet Kraak (1939–1954)
  - (Netherlands) Piet van der Kuil (1947–1955; 1964–1966)
  - (Netherlands) Niek Michel (1933–1944; 1947)
- **Netherlands** (continued)
  - (Netherlands) Kees Oldenburg (192?–19??)
  - (Netherlands) Gerrit Visser (1924–1925)
  - (Netherlands) Ab de Vries (1931–1933; 1933–1951)
- **Suriname**
  - (Suriname) Jayden Turfkruier (2024–2025)
  - (Suriname) Roscello Vlijter (2019–2022)

- Players in bold actively play for SC Telstar and for their respective national teams. Years in brackets indicate careerspan with SC Telstar.

=== National team players by Confederation ===
Member associations are listed in order of most to least amount of current and former SC Telstar players represented Internationally

Total national team players by confederation
Confederation	Total	(Nation) Association
AFC	2	Afghanistan (1), Indonesia (1)
CAF	2	Cape Verde (1), Central African Republic (1)
CONCACAF	5	Curaçao (2), Suriname (2), Guyana (1)
CONMEBOL	0	
OFC	0	
UEFA	7	Netherlands (6), Luxembourg (1)

== Players in international tournaments ==
The following is a list of Telstar players who have competed in international tournaments, including the FIFA World Cup, and the CONCACAF Gold Cup. To date, no Telstar players have participated in the UEFA European Championship, Copa América, Africa Cup of Nations, AFC Asian Cup, or the OFC Nations Cup while playing for the club.

Cup	Players
(France) 1938 FIFA World Cup	(Netherlands) Niek Michel
(Costa Rica) (Jamaica) (United States) 2019 CONCACAF Gold Cup	(Guyana) Terell Ondaan
(Canada) (United States) 2025 CONCACAF Gold Cup	(Curaçao) Tyrick Bodak (Suriname) Jayden Turfkruier
(Canada) (Mexico) (United States) 2026 FIFA World Cup	(Curaçao) Tyrick Bodak (Curaçao) Tyrese Noslin

== Coaching staff ==
Position	Staff
Head coach	(Netherlands) Henk Brugge
Assistant Coach	(Netherlands) Marcel Groninger (Netherlands) Wilko Braam
Goalkeeping Coach	(Netherlands) Harmen Kuperus
Medical Staff	First-Team Doctor: (Netherlands) Ron Peters (Netherlands) Pim Graafland; First-Team Physiotherapists: (Netherlands) Rens Teeuwen (Netherlands) Paul de Vlugt (Netherlands) Bob Kooning; Physio Assistant: (Netherlands) Clement Uittenbogaard
Equipment Manager	(Netherlands) Dirk van der Lugt
Performance Coaches	(Netherlands) Niels Bunink (Netherlands) Pieter van Roode
Video Analyst	(Netherlands) Pieter van der Slikke
Team Manager	(Netherlands) Jordi van Ewijk

== Historic facts ==
=== All-time leading goalscorers ===
Pos.	Name	Birth	Nationality	Goals
1	Glynor Plet	30 January 1987	(Netherlands)	90
2	Sander Oostrom	14 July 1967	(Netherlands)	87
3	Melvin Holwijn	2 January 1980	(Netherlands)	60
4	Ronald Hoop	4 April 1967	(Netherlands)	52
5	Cees van Kooten	20 August 1948	(Netherlands)	45
6	Rini van Roon	24 January 1961	(Netherlands)	43
7	Co Stout	7 September 1948	(Netherlands)	41
7	Ron de Roode	20 March 1965	(Netherlands)	41
9	Dick Bond	27 December 1943	(Netherlands)	38
10	Jan Bruin	30 September 1969	(Netherlands)	37

=== Most appearances ===
Pos.	Name	Birth	Nationality	Appearances
1	Frank Korpershoek	29 October 1984	(Netherlands)	386
2	Fred Bischot	23 July 1948	(Netherlands)	372
3	Frans van Essen	19 February 1948	(Netherlands)	360
4	Anthony Correia	2 May 1982	(Netherlands)	356
5	Paul van der Meeren	6 July 1944	(Netherlands)	339
6	Fred André	31 May 1941	(Netherlands)	321
7	Sander Oostrom	14 July 1967	(Netherlands)	320
8	Koos Kuut	2 January 1958	(Netherlands)	310
9	Richard van Heulen	13 October 1981	(Netherlands)	294
10	René Panhuis	26 August 1964	(Netherlands)	282

=== Managerial history ===
Telstar managers since 1963
Tenure	Manager	Nationality	Ref.
1963–1964	Toon van den Ende	Netherlands	
1964–1965	Jack Mansell	England	
1965–1966	Olivér Gáspár	Romania	
1966–1969	Piet de Visser	Netherlands	
1969–1974	Jan Rab	Netherlands	
1974–1977	Joop Castemiller	Netherlands	
1977–1978	Mircea Petescu	Romania	
1978–1980	Martin van Vianen	Netherlands	
1980–1983	Joop Brand	Netherlands	
1983–1987	Fred André	Netherlands	
1987–1988	Cor van der Hart	Netherlands	
1988–1990	Cees Glas	Netherlands	
1990–1993	Niels Overweg	Netherlands	
1993–1995	Simon Kistemaker	Netherlands	
1995–1997	Cor Pot	Netherlands	
1997–1998	Harry van den Ham	Netherlands	
1998–1999	Henny Lee	Netherlands	
1999–2001	Simon Kistemaker	Netherlands	
2001–2002	Toon Beijer	Netherlands	
2002–2005	Jan Poortvliet	Netherlands	
2005–2008	Luc Nijholt	Netherlands	
2008–2010	Edward Metgod	Netherlands	
2010–2012	Jan Poortvliet	Netherlands	
2012–2014	Marcel Keizer	Netherlands	
2014–2017	Michel Vonk	Netherlands	
2017–2019	Mike Snoei	Netherlands	
2019–2022	Andries Jonker	Netherlands	
2022–2024	Mike Snoei	Netherlands	
2024	Ulrich Landvreugd (interim)	Netherlands	
2024–2026	Anthony Correia	Netherlands	
2026–	Henk Brugge	Netherlands	
