= SV De Meteoor =

Dutch football club

Coordinates: 52°24′49″N 4°53′46″E

De Meteoor
- Full name: Sport Vereniging De Meteoor
- Founded: 17 March 1923; 102 years ago
- Ground: Sportpark Tuindorp Oostzaan, Amsterdam, Netherlands
- League: Derde Klasse Sunday (2024–25)
- Website: www.svdemeteoor.nl
Home colours	Away colours

Sport Vereniging De Meteoor are a Dutch amateur football (soccer) club from the Amsterdam borough of Amsterdam-Noord in the neighborhood Tuindorp Oostzaan, founded in 1923. The club hold a Sunday team competing in the Derde Klasse.
