= 1991–92 Eredivisie =

36th season of the Eredivisie

Eredivisie
- Season: 1991–92
- Champions: PSV (13th title)
- Promoted: De Graafschap; VVV
- Relegated: FC Den Haag; De Graafschap; VVV
- Champions League: PSV
- Cup Winners' Cup: Feyenoord
- UEFA Cup: Ajax; Vitesse Arnhem; FC Groningen
- Goals: 831
- Average goals/game: 2.71
- Top goalscorer: (Netherlands) Dennis Bergkamp; Ajax 22 goals

The 1991–92 season of the Dutch Eredivisie was contested by 18 teams. PSV won the title.

== League standings ==
Pos	Team	Pld	W	D	L	GF	GA	GD	Pts	Qualification or relegation
1	PSV (C)	34	25	8	1	82	24	+58	58	Qualification to Champions League first round
2	Ajax	34	25	5	4	83	24	+59	55	Qualification to UEFA Cup first round
3	Feyenoord (Note: Winners of the KNVB Cup)	34	20	9	5	54	19	+35	49	Qualification to Cup Winners' Cup first round
4	Vitesse Arnhem	34	15	10	9	47	33	+14	40	Qualification to UEFA Cup first round
5	FC Groningen	34	14	11	9	44	37	+7	39	Qualification to UEFA Cup first round
6	FC Twente	34	13	9	12	53	49	+4	35	
7	MVV	34	11	13	10	42	44	−2	35	
8	Sparta	34	11	13	10	50	53	−3	35	
9	Roda JC	34	12	11	11	41	45	−4	35	
10	RKC (Note: Clubs participating in the 1992 Intertoto Cup)	34	10	14	10	50	49	+1	34	
11	FC Utrecht	34	9	15	10	37	39	−2	33	
12	Willem II	34	11	9	14	44	45	−1	31	
13	FC Volendam	34	10	8	16	34	50	−16	28	
14	Fortuna Sittard	34	7	11	16	36	50	−14	25	
15	SVV/Dordrecht '90	34	9	7	18	38	64	−26	25	
16	FC Den Haag (R)	34	6	10	18	35	63	−28	22	Qualification to Relegation play-offs
17	De Graafschap (R)	34	6	9	19	29	59	−30	21	Relegation to Eerste Divisie
18	VVV (R)	34	3	6	25	32	84	−52	12	Relegation to Eerste Divisie

(C) Champions; (R) Relegated

== Results ==
Home \ Away	AJA	FEY	FOR	GRA	GRO	DHA	MVV	PSV	RKC	RJC	SPA	SDO	TWE	UTR	VIT	VOL	VVV	WIL
Ajax	—	3–1	3–1	5–1	0–0	3–2	3–0	1–0	5–1	2–0	4–0	1–0	7–0	1–0	0–2	3–0	3–1	3–0
Feyenoord	2–0	—	3–0	3–0	0–0	3–0	0–1	1–1	0–0	1–1	2–0	2–0	1–0	0–0	5–0	1–0	5–1	3–1
Fortuna Sittard	0–1	0–1	—	3–1	2–2	0–1	0–0	2–5	1–0	0–1	2–2	0–0	3–1	2–2	2–2	4–1	0–1	0–0
De Graafschap	0–1	1–1	2–0	—	0–0	2–4	1–1	0–2	2–2	3–2	0–1	0–0	0–0	0–0	2–0	3–0	1–0	1–2
Groningen	1–2	1–0	2–1	1–0	—	3–1	2–2	0–3	2–0	1–2	1–0	5–0	1–2	2–0	1–2	1–0	3–2	1–0
FC Den Haag	0–0	1–4	1–0	4–0	2–2	—	1–2	0–2	0–0	5–3	0–0	0–1	0–4	0–0	0–3	5–0	2–2	0–2
MVV	1–4	0–1	0–0	0–0	3–3	1–1	—	1–1	1–1	0–2	1–3	3–1	0–3	3–1	2–1	1–2	1–0	1–1
PSV Eindhoven	3–2	2–1	1–0	5–0	2–1	2–1	1–1	—	5–0	2–1	4–1	5–0	3–3	2–1	2–0	1–1	4–0	3–0
RKC	2–2	2–3	2–2	2–1	0–0	3–0	1–1	2–2	—	0–1	6–2	2–0	4–1	1–1	1–0	2–1	3–3	1–2
Roda	0–3	0–0	0–0	3–2	0–0	5–0	0–2	0–0	1–0	—	1–1	1–0	1–1	2–0	1–1	1–5	3–2	0–0
Sparta Rotterdam	1–3	0–0	3–2	1–1	4–2	4–0	1–2	1–3	2–3	4–0	—	1–1	3–2	2–1	1–1	2–1	1–1	1–1
SVV/Dordrecht '90	0–5	0–1	2–1	3–1	0–1	2–2	2–3	1–2	3–2	2–0	0–0	—	1–0	1–2	0–1	3–2	6–1	0–3
Twente	0–0	1–2	3–1	3–0	4–1	0–0	1–0	0–4	1–1	1–1	4–0	5–0	—	2–0	1–2	0–1	2–1	1–0
Utrecht	2–1	0–0	1–1	2–0	0–2	4–1	3–2	1–1	1–1	3–1	1–1	1–1	1–1	—	1–1	0–0	3–1	1–0
Vitesse	0–0	2–1	0–1	1–0	0–0	2–0	1–2	1–2	0–1	0–0	1–1	4–1	4–1	1–0	—	0–0	6–1	3–1
Volendam	1–4	0–1	0–1	2–1	2–0	0–0	2–0	0–3	0–3	3–2	1–1	2–3	0–0	4–2	0–1	—	1–0	0–0
VVV	0–4	0–1	1–4	1–2	1–2	2–1	0–4	0–2	0–0	1–3	1–3	3–2	3–4	1–1	0–0	0–1	—	1–2
Willem II	2–4	1–4	5–0	4–1	0–0	2–0	0–0	0–2	3–1	0–2	0–2	2–2	3–1	0–1	2–4	1–1	4–0	—

Legend: Blue = home team win; Yellow = draw; Red = away team win.

== Promotion/relegation play-offs ==
The number 16 of the Eredivisie would play against relegation against the runners-up of the promotion/relegation play-offs of the Eerste Divisie. The Eerste Divisie league champions and winner of the play-offs would replace the numbers 17 and 18 of this league directly.

Team 1	Agg.	Team 2	1st leg	2nd leg
Go Ahead Eagles	4-0	FC Den Haag	3-0	1-0

Go Ahead Eagles: promoted to Eredivisie
FC Den Haag: relegated to Eerste Divisie

== Topscorers ==
Goals	Player	Team
22	(Netherlands) Dennis Bergkamp	Ajax
19	(Netherlands) Harry Decheiver	RKC
17	(Netherlands) Wim Kieft	PSV
17	(Netherlands) Youri Mulder	FC Twente
15	(Sweden) Stefan Pettersson	Ajax

== Attendances ==
No.	Club	Average	Change	Highest
1	PSV	24,015	-3,4%	27,500
2	AFC Ajax	18,530	-16,8%	48,000
3	Feyenoord	17,648	-0,2%	48,000
4	FC Groningen	14,246	-1,0%	18,000
5	De Graafschap	7,181	29,3%	10,500
6	FC Utrecht	6,559	-19,3%	14,000
7	Willem II	6,456	-8,5%	12,500
8	SBV Vitesse	6,222	-6,5%	11,500
9	FC Twente	5,795	-8,1%	13,000
10	MVV Maastricht	5,438	21,1%	10,500
11	Roda JC	4,987	4,7%	13,000
12	Fortuna Sittard	4,829	-0,7%	11,800
13	Sparta Rotterdam	4,250	-8,0%	12,500
14	FC Den Haag	4,135	-33,3%	9,000
15	VVV	3,977	6,1%	10,000
16	FC Volendam	3,579	-24,1%	8,300
17	RKC Waalwijk	3,547	13,7%	8,000
18	Dordrecht '90	2,190	-46,2%	8,500

== See also ==
- 1991–92 Eerste Divisie
- 1991–92 KNVB Cup
