= VC Vlissingen =

Dutch football club

- Full name: Voetbal Combinatie Vlissingen
- Founded: 1916
- Ground: Sportpark Irislaan
- Capacity: 8,000
- Coordinates: 51°27′30″N 3°34′43″E
- League: Vijfde Klasse
- Website: https://www.vcvlissingen.nl/
Home colours

VC Vlissingen is a Dutch football team based in Vlissingen, playing in the Hoofdklasse.

During the two seasons it spent as a professional team in the Eerste Divisie, the team was known as VCV Zeeland. Players during the professional years include Emiel Dorst, Harry van den Ham, and Peter van Vossen.
