= 2024–25 SC Telstar season =

Dutch football club season

SC Telstar
2024–25 season
- Head coach: Anthony Correia
- Stadium: 711 Stadion
- Eerste Divisie: 7th
- Promotion play-offs: Winners (Promoted)
- KNVB Cup: 2nd round
- Top goalscorer: League: Youssef El Kachati (24 goals); All: Youssef El Kachati (25 goals)
- Highest home attendance: 4,177 (38th week, Promotion playoffs 1st round 1st match, Promotion playoffs final 1st match)
- Lowest home attendance: 1,543 (KNVB Cup 1st round)
- Average home league attendance: 2,768
- Biggest win: 6-0 (Jong FC Utrecht (h) 25th week)
- Biggest defeat: 5-1 (MVV Maastricht (a) 20th week)
- All statistics correct as of 1 June 2025.

The 2024–25 season was the 62nd season in the history of SC Telstar since its establishment and the club's 47th consecutive campaign in the Eerste Divisie, the second tier of Dutch football. It marked Telstar's 48th overall season in the competition. The club also participated in the KNVB Cup, where they were eliminated in the second round following a 2–0 defeat to Ajax.

SC Telstar finished seventh in the Eerste Divisie, securing a place in the promotion play-offs. They eliminated ADO Den Haag in the first round, overcame FC Den Bosch after extra time in the semi-finals, and defeated Willem II Tilburg in the final to secure promotion to the Eredivisie for the first time since 1978, ending a 47-year absence from the Dutch top flight.

Youssef El Kachati was Telstar's leading goalscorer with 25 goals across all competitions, scoring 19 in the Eerste Divisie, five in the promotion play-offs and one in the KNVB Cup. Mitch Apau and Ronald Koeman Jr. made the most appearances for the club, each featuring in 46 competitive matches, including 38 league fixtures, six promotion play-off matches and two KNVB Cup appearances.

== Players ==
=== First-team squad ===
As of 7 February 2024

Note: Flags indicate national team as defined under FIFA eligibility rules; some limited exceptions apply. Players may hold more than one non-FIFA nationality.

No.	Pos.	Nation	Player
1	GK	NED	Ronald Koeman Jr.
2	DF	NED	Jeff Hardeveld
3	DF	NED	Mitch Apau
4	DF	NED	Guus Offerhaus
4	DF	SUR	Marjan Olfers
5	DF	NED	Sem Dirks
6	DF	NED	Danny Bakker
7	FW	NED	Cain Seedorf
7	FW	NED	Mohamed Hamdaoui
8	DF	SUR	Jayden Turfkruier
9	FW	MAR	Youssef El Kachati
10	FW	NED	Zakaria Eddahchouri
11	DF	CUW	Tyrese Noslin

No.	Pos.	Nation	Player
12	MF	NED	Tom Overtoom
14	MF	NED	Mees Kaandorp
15	DF	NED	Adil Lechkar
16	DF	NED	Achraf Douiri
17	MF	NED	Nils Rossen
18	MF	NED	Remi van Ekeris
19	FW	NED	Sebastiaan Hagedoorn
21	DF	NED	Devon Koswal
23	FW	NED	Soufiane Hetli
24	DF	NED	Abdelraffie Benzzine
25	MF	NED	Tyrone Owusu
26	DF	NED	Jaylan van Schooneveld
27	FW	NED	Reda Kharchouch

== Transfers ==
=== In ===
Pos.	Player	Transferred from	Fee	Date
DF	(Netherlands) Adil Lechkar	(Netherlands) SV TEC	—N/a	1 July 2024
DF	(Netherlands) Guus Offerhaus	(Netherlands) Quick Boys	—N/a	1 July 2024
MF	(Netherlands) Remi van Ekeris	(Netherlands) FC Lisse	—N/a	1 July 2024
FW	(Netherlands) Soufiane Hetli	(Netherlands) Amsterdamsche FC	Free	1 July 2024
MF	(Netherlands) Tyrone Owusu	(Netherlands) Quick Boys	—N/a	1 July 2024
MF	(Netherlands) Nils Rossen	(Netherlands) NEC Nijmegen	Free	8 August 2024
DF	(Netherlands) Sem Dirks	(Netherlands) VVV-Venlo	Free	8 August 2024
MF	(Curaçao) Tyrese Noslin	(Netherlands) Jong Almere City	Free	8 August 2024
FW	(Netherlands) Reda Kharchouch	(Saudi Arabia) Hajer FC	Free	27 August 2024
MF	(Netherlands) Jeff Hardeveld	(Netherlands) FC Emmen	Free	2 September 2024
FW	(Netherlands) Mohamed Hamdaoui	(Netherlands) ADO Den Haag	Free	2 September 2024
FW	(Netherlands) Achraf Douiri	No club	—N/a	7 February 2025

=== Out ===
Pos.	Player	Transferred to	Fee	Date
MF	(Netherlands) Alae-Eddine Bouyaghlafen	No club	—N/a	1 July 2024
MF	(Netherlands) Alex Plat	(Netherlands) FC Volendam	Free	1 July 2024
DF	(Netherlands) Jay Kruiver	(Netherlands) Roda JC Kerkrade	Free	1 July 2024
DF	(Netherlands) Leonardo Rocha de Almeida	No club	—N/a	1 July 2024
FW	(Morocco) Mohammed Tahiri	(Netherlands) VV Katwijk	Free	1 July 2024
FW	(Netherlands) Quinten van den Heerik	(Spain) Terrassa FC	Free	1 July 2024
DF	(Netherlands) Robin Polley	No club	—N/a	1 July 2024
DF	(Netherlands) Thomas Oude Kotte	(Netherlands) Roda JC Kerkrade	Free	1 July 2024
FW	(Netherlands) Yahya Boussakou	No club	—N/a	1 July 2024
MF	(Netherlands) Tim van de Loo	(Netherlands) Roda JC Kerkrade	—N/a	1 July 2024
DF	(South Africa) Peter Guinari	No club	—N/a	17 July 2024
FW	(Greece) Christos Giousis	(Cyprus) Karmiotissa FC	Free	18 July 2024
FW	(Cape Verde) Jorginho Soares	(Netherlands) FC Emmen	Free	19 July 2024
DF	(Netherlands) Yaël Liesdek	(Denmark) Akademisk Boldklub	Free	24 July 2024
FW	(Suriname) Danzell Gravenberch	(Netherlands) FC Den Bosch	Free	30 July 2024

== Friendlies ==
23 July 2024 Friendly	IJsselmeervogels (Netherlands)	0–5	(Netherlands) SC Telstar
20:00			Zakaria Eddahchouri 23'; Youssef El Kachati 38' 56'; Sebastiaan Hagedoorn 88'; Cain Seedorf 90' (pen.)

27 July 2024 Friendly	SC Telstar (Netherlands)	2–1	(Netherlands) Koninklijke HFC
13:30	Jaylan van Schooneveld 2'; Cain Seedorf 49'		4'
Note: The game consisted of two 30-minute halves.

27 July 2024 Friendly	VV Katwijk (Netherlands)	0–0 (2–3 p)	(Netherlands) SC Telstar
15:30
Note: The game consisted of two 30-minute halves.

30 July 2024 Friendly	SC Telstar (Netherlands)	5–3	(Netherlands) VV Noordwijk
20:00	Cain Seedorf 35' 86'; Youssef El Kachati 38'; Zakaria Eddahchouri 57'; Elijah Velland 78'		Emiel Wendt 13' 20'; Mohamed El Kharbachi 22'

2 August 2024 Friendly	SC Telstar (Netherlands)	4–1	(Qatar) Umm Salal SC
18:45	Zakaria Eddahchouri 25' 69' 83'; Remi van Ekeris 90'		Ali Afif 67'

== Competitions ==
=== Overall record ===
Competition	First match	Last match	Starting round	Final position	Record							
Competition	First match	Last match	Starting round	Final position	Pld	W	D	L	GF	GA	GD	Win %
Eerste Divisie	9 August 2024	9 May 2025	Week 1	7th	38	17	10	11	69	47	+22	44.74
Promotion playoffs	13 May 2025	1 June 2025	1st round	Final	6	4	2	0	10	4	+6	66.67
KNVB Cup	31 October 2024	19 December 2024	1st round	2nd round	2	1	0	1	3	2	+1	50.00
Total					46	22	12	12	82	53	+29	47.83

Last updated: 1 June 2025
Source: ESPN

=== Eerste Divisie ===
==== League table ====
Pos	Team	Pld	W	D	L	GF	GA	GD	Pts	Promotion or qualification
5	Dordrecht	38	20	8	10	69	46	+23	68	Qualification for promotion play-offs
6	De Graafschap	38	19	8	11	73	50	+23	65	Qualification for promotion play-offs
7	Telstar (O, P)	38	17	10	11	69	47	+22	61	Qualification for promotion play-offs
8	Emmen	38	17	5	16	56	53	+3	56	
9	Den Bosch (Note: Winner of the First Period (Rounds 1–9))	38	15	10	13	53	48	+5	55	Qualification for promotion play-offs

Source: Flashscore, Keuken Kampioen Divisie (in Dutch)
Rules for classification: Season in progress: 1) Most points won; 2) Less points lost; 3) Goal difference; 4) Goals scored; 5) Alphabetical order; End of season: 1) Points; 2) Goal difference; 3) Goals scored; 4) Head-to-head points; 5) Head-to-head goal difference; 6) Head-to-head away goals scored; 7) Play-off if relevant for deciding champion, relegation or participating in a European league, otherwise by draw. 8) Penalty shoot-out (only after a play-off)
(O) Play-off winners; (P) Promoted

==== Results summary ====
Overall								Home						Away					
Pld	W	D	L	GF	GA	GD	Pts	W	D	L	GF	GA	GD	W	D	L	GF	GA	GD
38	17	10	11	69	47	+22	61	11	6	2	44	16	+28	6	4	9	25	31	−6

Source: https://www.espn.nl/voetbal/team/scorebord/_/id/3735/season/2024/ ESPN

==== Results by round ====
Round	1	2	3	4	5	6	7	8	9	10	11	12	13	14	15	16	17	18	19	20	21	22	23	24	25	26	27	28	29	30	31	32	33	34	35	36	37	38
Ground	A	H	A	H	H	A	A	H	A	H	A	A	H	A	H	A	H	A	H	A	H	A	H	A	H	A	H	A	H	H	A	H	A	H	A	H	A	H
Result	W	L	W	D	W	L	D	D	D	D	D	W	D	L	W	L	D	L	W	L	W	L	W	L	W	W	L	W	W	W	L	W	D	D	W	W	L	W
Position	5	12	4	9	5	5	7	6	8	9	8	7	8	11	9	11	11	12	11	11	11	11	11	11	10	8	10	8	7	7	7	7	8	8	7	7	7	7

Source: https://www.espn.nl/voetbal/team/scorebord/_/id/3735/season/2024/ ESPN
A = Away; H = Home; W = Win; D = Draw; L = Loss

=== Matches ===
==== 1st half ====
9 August 2024 1st week	SBV Vitesse	2–3	SC Telstar	Arnhem
20:00	Marcus Steffen 70'; Tomislav Gudelj 73'	Report	Danny Bakker 35' 81'; Zakaria Eddahchouri 86'	Stadium: GelreDome; Attendance: 17,014; Referee: Robin Hensgens

16 August 2024 2nd week	SC Telstar	0–3	FC Eindhoven	Velsen-Zuid
20:00		Report	Hugo Deenen 23' 54'; Boris van Schuppen 74'	Stadium: 711 Stadion; Attendance: 1,600; Referee: Sander van ver Eijk

26 August 2024 3rd week	Jong PSV	0–2	SC Telstar	Eindhoven
20:00		Report	Zakaria Eddahchouri 27' 85'	Stadium: De Herdgang; Attendance: 650; Referee: Boyd van Kommer

30 August 2024 4th week	SC Telstar	0–0	Jong AZ	Velsen-Zuid
20:00		Report		Stadium: 711 Stadion; Attendance: 2,050; Referee: Kevin Puts

8 September 2024 5th week	SC Telstar	4–0	MVV Maastricht	Velsen-Zuid
14:30	Jayden Turfkruier 18' 65'; Mees Kaandorp 57'; Zakaria Eddahchouri 73'	Report		Stadium: 711 Stadion; Attendance: 2,250; Referee: Wouter Wiersma

13 September 2024 6th week	Excelsior Rotterdam	3–2	SC Telstar	Rotterdam
20:00	Jacky Donkor 30'; Seydou Fini 42'; Ilias Bronkhorst 76'	Report	Youssef El Kachati 68'; Mohamed Hamdaoui 89'	Stadium: Stadion Woudestein; Attendance: 4,071; Referee: Joey Kooij

20 September 2024 7th week	ADO Den Haag	1–1	SC Telstar	The Hague
20:00	Joel Ideho 10'	Report	Zakaria Eddahchouri 25'	Stadium: Bingoal Stadion; Attendance: 6,437; Referee: Erwin Blank

28 September 2024 8th week	SC Telstar	0–0	FC Den Bosch	Velsen-Zuid
16:30		Report		Stadium: 711 Stadion; Attendance: 2,063; Referee: Marc Nagtegaal

4 October 2024 9th week	Jong FC Utrecht	1–1	SC Telstar	Utrecht
20:00	Sil van der Wegen 90+5'	Report	Zakaria Eddahchouri 27'	Stadium: Sportcomplex Zoudenbalch; Attendance: 418; Referee: Thomas Hardeman

12 October 2024 10th week	SC Telstar	2–2	De Graafschap	Velsen-Zuid
20:00	Zakaria Eddahchouri 6' 75'	Report	Jesse van de Haar 31'; Ralf Seuntjens 34'	Stadium: 711 Stadion; Attendance: 2,363; Referee: Stan Teuben

18 October 2024 11th week	TOP Oss	1–1	SC Telstar	Oss
20:00	Arthur Allemeersch 87'	Report	Zakaria Eddahchouri 4' (pen.)	Stadium: Frans Heesen Stadion; Attendance: 1,582; Referee: Robin Hensgens

27 October 2024 12th week	FC Emmen	0–1	SC Telstar	Emmen
12:15		Report	Tyrese Noslin 43'	Stadium: De Oude Meerdijk; Attendance: 7,708; Referee: Wouter Wiersma

3 November 2024 13th week	SC Telstar	2–2	FC Volendam	Velsen-Zuid
14:30	Youssef El Kachati 38'; Danny Bakker 54'	Report	Henk Veerman 32'; Alex Plat 64'	Stadium: 711 Stadion; Attendance: 3,566; Referee: Edwin van de Graaf

9 November 2024 14th week	Roda JC Kerkrade	1–0	SC Telstar	Kerkrade
16:30	Cain Seedorf 17'	Report		Stadium: Parkstad Limburg Stadion; Attendance: 7,135; Referee: Jeroen Manschot

15 November 2024 15th week	SC Telstar	4–0	VVV-Venlo	Velsen-Zuid
20:00	Youssef El Kachati 2' 72'; Zakaria Eddahchouri 25' (pen.); Danny Bakker 84'	Report		Stadium: 711 Stadion; Attendance: 2,626; Referee: Rick Sturm

22 November 2024 16th week	Jong Ajax	3–0	SC Telstar	Duivendrecht, Amsterdam
20:00	Don-Angelo Konadu 20'; Jan Faberski 64'; Jaydon Banel 90+2'	Report		Stadium: Sportpark De Toekomst; Attendance: 767; Referee: Stan Teuben

29 November 2024 17th week	SC Telstar	2–2	SC Cambuur	Velsen-Zuid
2,700	Youssef El Kachati 15' 32'	Report	Mark Diemers 45+1'; Remco Balk 90+1'	Stadium: 711 Stadion; Attendance: 2,700; Referee: Martin Fernando Perezlindo

6 December 2024 18th week	FC Dordrecht	3–2	SC Telstar	Dordrecht
20:00	Sem Valk 55'; Korede Osundina 60'; Jari Schuurman 74'	Report	Zakaria Eddahchouri 45'; Soufiane Hetli 90+3'	Stadium: Stadion Krommedijk; Attendance: 2,326; Referee: Kevin Puts

13 December 2024 19th week	SC Telstar	3–0	Helmond Sport	Velsen-Zuid
20:00	Zakaria Eddahchouri 32' 44' 69'	Report		Stadium: 711 Stadion; Attendance: 2,202; Referee: Laurens Gerrets

22 December 2024 20th week	MVV Maastricht	5–1	SC Telstar	Maastricht
14:30	Ilano Silva Timas 22' 75'; Sven Braken 27'; Camil Mmaee 80'; Ferre Slegers 90+2'	Report	Soufiane Hetli 35'	Stadium: De Geusselt; Attendance: 4,355; Referee: Martin van den Kerkhof

==== 2nd half ====
12 January 2025 21st week	SC Telstar	1–0	Jong PSV	Velsen-Zuid
12:15	Zakaria Eddahchouri 60'	Report		Stadium: 711 Stadion; Attendance: 1,978; Referee: Thomas Hardeman

17 January 2025 22nd week	VVV-Venlo	1–0	SC Telstar	Venlo
20:00	Elias Sierra 78'	Report		Stadium: De Koel; Attendance: 4,077; Referee: Robin Vereijken

25 January 2025 23rd week	SC Telstar	3–0	Jong Ajax	Velsen-Zuid
16:30	Zakaria Eddahchouri 21' 40'; Tyrese Noslin 49'	Report		Stadium: 711 Stadion; Attendance: 3,102; Referee: Martijn Vos

31 January 2025 24th week	SC Cambuur	2–1	SC Telstar	Leeuwarden
20:00	Tony Rölke 51'; Michael de Leeuw 77'	Report	Youssef El Kachati 39'	Stadium: Cambuur Stadion; Attendance: 12,233; Referee: Martin Fernando Perezlindo

9 February 2025 25th week	SC Telstar	6–0	Jong FC Utrecht	Velsen-Zuid
16:45	Jeff Hardeveld 4'; Danny Bakker 21'; Soufiane Hetli 71'; Youssef El Kachati 79' 88'; Tom Overtoom 90+3'	Report		Stadium: 711 Stadion; Attendance: 1,816; Referee: Luuk Timmer

14 February 2025 26th week	FC Den Bosch	0–1	SC Telstar	's-Hertogenbosch
20:00		Report	Youssef El Kachati 90+2'	Stadium: De Vliert; Attendance: 5,211; Referee: Rick Sturm

21 February 2025 27th week	SC Telstar	1–3	Excelsior Rotterdam	Velsen-Zuid
20:00	Youssef El Kachati 72'	Report	Lance Duijvestijn 24' 62'; Kik Pierie 54'	Stadium: 711 Stadion; Attendance: 2,683; Referee: Martin van den Kerkhof

3 March 2025 28th week	Jong AZ	1–2	SC Telstar	Velsen-Zuid
20:00	Ro-Zangelo Daal 87' (pen.)	Report	Tyrone Owusu 21'; Youssef El Kachati 40' (pen.)	Stadium: 711 Stadion; Attendance: 650; Referee: Thomas Hardeman

7 March 2025 29th week	SC Telstar	5–0	FC Dordrecht	Velsen-Zuid
20:00	Dewon Koswal 7'; Tyrese Noslin 39'; Jeff Hardeveld 44'; Tyrone Owusu 45+2'; Youssef El Kachati 54'	Report		Stadium: 711 Stadion; Attendance: 2,362; Referee: Edwin van de Graaf

11 March 2025 31st week	FC Volendam	3–0	SC Telstar	Volendam
20:00	Henk Veerman 56' 59' 76'	Report		Stadium: Kras Stadion; Attendance: 5,919; Referee: Martijn Vos

14 March 2025 30th week	SC Telstar	3–1	Roda JC Kerkrade	Velsen-Zuid
20:00	Youssef El Kachati 10' 69'; Mees Kaandorp 80'	Report	Michael Breij 89'	Stadium: 711 Stadion; Attendance: 2,500; Referee: Jannick van ver Laan

28 March 2025 32th week	SC Telstar	1–0	SBV Vitesse	Velsen-Zuid
20:00	Danny Bakker 90+4'	Report		Stadium: 711 Stadion; Attendance: 3,381; Referee: Robin Hensgens

5 April 2025 33rd week	Helmond Sport	2–2	SC Telstar	Helmond
16:30	Anthony van der Hurk 1'; Lennerd Daneels 18'	Report	Mohamed Hamdaoui 38'; Jeff Hardeveld 90+7'	Stadium: Stadion De Braak; Attendance: 2,900; Referee: Clay Ruperti

11 April 2025 34th week	SC Telstar	1–1	ADO Den Haag	Velsen-Zuid
20:00	Tyrone Owusu 34'	Report	Alex Schalk 70'	Stadium: 711 Stadion; Attendance: 3,404; Referee: Bas Nijhuis

18 April 2025 35th week	FC Eindhoven	0–4	SC Telstar	Eindhoven
20:00		Report	Youssef El Kachati 10'; Mohamed Hamdaoui 19'; Soufiane Hetli 26' 55'	Stadium: Jan Louwers Stadion; Attendance: 2,734; Referee: Martin Fernando Perezlindo

25 April 2025 36th week	SC Telstar	3–2	TOP Oss	Velsen-Zuid
20:00	Soufiane Hetli 53'; Jeff Hardeveld 66'; Youssef El Kachati 82' (pen.)	Report	Giovanni Troupée 9'; Arthur Allemeersch 90+2' (pen.)	Stadium: 711 Stadion; Attendance: 2,858; Referee: Rick Sturm

2 May 2025 37th week	De Graafschap	2–1	SC Telstar	Doetinchem
20:00	Jack Cooper Love 26'; Tristan van Gilst 61'	Report	Youssef El Kachati 29'	Stadium: De Vijverberg; Attendance: 11,642; Referee: Alex Bos

9 May 2025 38th week	SC Telstar	3–0	FC Emmen	Velsen-Zuid
20:00	Guus Offerhaus 4'; Jeff Hardeveld 24'; Youssef El Kachati 73'	Report		Stadium: 711 Stadion; Attendance: 4,177; Referee: Martin van den Kerkhof

==== Promotion play-offs ====
13 May 2025 1st round 1st match	SC Telstar	2–0	ADO Den Haag	Velsen-Zuid
18:45	Youssef El Kachati 5'; Danny Bakker 45+1'	Report		Stadium: 711 Stadion; Attendance: 4,177; Referee: Rob Dieperink

17 May 2025 1st round 2nd match	ADO Den Haag	0–1 (0–3 agg.)	SC Telstar	The Hague
16:30		Report	Youssef El Kachati 71'	Stadium: Bingoal Stadion; Attendance: 8.793; Referee: Marc Nagtegaal

SC Telstar won 3–0 on aggregate.

20 May 2025 Semi-final 1st match	FC Den Bosch	0–0	SC Telstar	's-Hertogenbosch
20:00		Report		Stadium: De Vliert; Attendance: 6,737; Referee: Allard Lindhout

23 May 2025 Semi-final 2nd match	SC Telstar	2–1 (2–1 agg.)	FC Den Bosch	Velsen-Zuid
20:00	Youssef El Kachati 30' (pen.); Danny Bakker 109'	Report	Teun van Grunsven 18'	Stadium: 711 Stadion; Attendance: 4,077; Referee: Bas Nijhuis

SC Telstar won 2–1 on aggregate.

29 May 2025 Final 1st match	SC Telstar	2–2	Willem II Tilburg	Velsen-Zuid
20:00	Rúnar Þór Sigurgeirsson 56' (o.g.); Youssef El Kachati 65'	Report	Ringo Meerveld 14'; Emilio Kehrer 81'	Stadium: 711 Stadion; Attendance: 4,177; Referee: Jeroen Manschot

1 June 2025 Final 2nd match	Willem II Tilburg	1–3 (3-5 agg.)	SC Telstar	Tilburg
18:00	Rob Nizet 17'	Report	Mees Kaandorp 6' 58'; Youssef El Kachati 12'	Stadium: Koning Willem II Stadion; Attendance: 14,500; Referee: Danny Makkelie

SC Telstar won 5–3 on aggregate.

=== KNVB Cup ===
31 October 2024 1st round	SC Telstar	3–0	Helmond Sport	Velsen-Zuid
20:00	Youssef El Kachati 50'; Nils Rossen 61'; Danny Bakker 65'	Report		Stadium: 711 Stadion; Attendance: 1,543; Referee: Robin Vereijken

19 December 2024 2nd round	AFC Ajax	2–0	SC Telstar	Amsterdam
21:00	Daniele Rugani 64'; Chuba Akpom 86'	Report		Stadium: Johan Cruyff Arena; Attendance: 53,017; Referee: Sander van der Eijk

== Statistics ==
=== Scorers ===
#	Player	Eerste Divisie	Promotion Play-offs	KNVB	Total
1	(Morocco) Youssef El Kachati	19	5	1	25
2	(Netherlands) Zakaria Eddahchouri	17	0	0	17
3	(Netherlands) Danny Bakker	6	2	1	9
4	(Netherlands) Soufiane Hetli	6	0	0	6
5	(Netherlands) Jeff Hardeveld	5	0	0	5
6	(Netherlands) Mees Kaandorp	2	2	0	4
7	(Netherlands) Mohamed Hamdaoui	3	0	0	3
7	(Netherlands) Tyrese Noslin	3	0	0	3
7	(Netherlands) Tyrone Owusu	3	0	0	3
10	(Netherlands) Jayden Turfkruier	2	0	0	2
11	(Netherlands) Cain Seedorf	1	0	0	1
11	(Netherlands) Devon Koswal	1	0	0	1
11	(Netherlands) Guus Offerhaus	1	0	0	1
11	(Netherlands) Tom Overtoom	1	0	0	1
11	(Netherlands) Nils Rossen	0	0	1	1

=== Appearances ===
#	Player	Eerste Divisie	Promotion Play-offs	KNVB	Total
1	(Netherlands) Mitch Apau	38	6	2	46
1	(Netherlands) Ronald Koeman Jr.	38	6	2	46
3	(Netherlands) Danny Bakker	37	6	2	45
3	(Morocco) Youssef El Kachati	37	6	2	45
5	(Netherlands) Guus Offerhaus	36	6	2	44
6	(Netherlands) Nils Rossen	35	6	2	43
7	(Netherlands) Jeff Hardeveld	34	6	2	42
8	(Suriname) Jayden Turfkruier	33	6	2	41
9	(Curaçao) Tyrese Noslin	32	6	2	40
10	(Netherlands) Mees Kaandorp	29	6	1	36
11	(Netherlands) Soufiane Hetli	33	0	2	35
11	(Netherlands) Devon Koswal	28	6	1	35
13	(Netherlands) Tyrone Owusu	27	6	1	34
14	(Netherlands) Mohamed Hamdaoui	27	4	2	33
15	(Netherlands) Reda Kharchouch	24	5	1	30
16	(Netherlands) Zakaria Eddahchouri	23	0	2	25
17	(Netherlands) Remi van Ekeris	17	3	0	20
17	(Netherlands) Sebastiaan Hagedoorn	16	4	0	20
19	(Netherlands) Sem Dirks	16	0	2	18
20	(Netherlands) Tom Overtoom	12	4	1	17
21	(Netherlands) Adil Lechkar	10	1	1	12
22	(Netherlands) Cain Seedorf	4	0	0	4
23	(Netherlands) Achraf Douiri	3	0	0	3
24	(Netherlands) Abdelraffie Benzzine	2	0	0	2
24	(Suriname) Marjan Olfers	2	0	0	2
26	(Netherlands) Jaylan van Schooneveld	1	0	0	1

=== Clean sheets ===
#	Player	Eerste Divisie	KNVB Cup	Promotion playoffs	Total
1	(Netherlands) Ronald Koeman Jr.	15	2	1	18

=== Disciplinary record ===
#	Player	Eerste Divisie		Promotion Play-offs		KNVB		Total	
#	Player	Yellow card	Red card	Yellow card	Red card	Yellow card	Red card	Yellow card	Red card
1	(Morocco) Youssef El Kachati	8	0	0	0	0	0	8	0
1	(Netherlands) Danny Bakker	6	0	1	0	1	0	8	0
3	(Netherlands) Devon Koswal	6	0	1	0	0	0	7	0
3	(Curaçao) Tyrese Noslin	6	0	1	0	0	0	7	0
5	(Netherlands) Guus Offerhaus	5	0	1	0	0	0	6	0
6	(Suriname) Jayden Turfkruier	4	0	1	0	0	0	5	0
6	(Netherlands) Jeff Hardeveld	4	0	1	0	0	0	5	0
6	(Netherlands) Mitch Apau	4	0	1	0	0	0	5	0
9	(Netherlands) Nils Rossen	4	0	0	0	0	0	4	0
9	(Netherlands) Remi van Ekeris	3	0	1	0	0	0	4	0
9	(Netherlands) Tyrone Owusu	3	0	1	0	0	0	4	0
12	(Netherlands) Reda Kharchouch	2	0	1	0	0	0	3	0
13	(Netherlands) Mohamed Hamdaoui	2	0	0	0	0	0	2	0
13	(Netherlands) Ronald Koeman Jr.	2	0	0	0	0	0	2	0
13	(Netherlands) Zakaria Eddahchouri	2	0	0	0	0	0	2	0
16	(Netherlands) Achraf Douiri	1	0	0	0	0	0	1	0
16	(Netherlands) Sem Dirks	1	0	0	0	0	0	1	0
16	(Netherlands) Soufiane Hetli	1	0	0	0	0	0	1	0
