= 2024–25 Almere City FC season =

Almere City FC
2024–25 season
- Owner: Yanmar
- Manager: Hedwiges Maduro (until 18 December); Jeroen Rijsdijk (from 3 January)
- Stadium: Yanmar Stadion
- Eredivisie: 18th (relegated)
- KNVB Cup: First round
- Top goalscorer: League: Junior Kadile (5); All: Junior Kadile (5)
- Highest home attendance: 4,222 (v. multiple)
- Lowest home attendance: 2,921 (v. Fortuna Sittard, 14 May 2025)
- Average home league attendance: 3,770
- Biggest win: 3–0 v. Heerenveen (21 December 2024, Eredivisie)
- Biggest defeat: 1–7 v. PSV (24 August 2024, Eredivisie)
Home colours

The 2024–25 season was Almere City's 24th season of existence and their second consecutive campaign in the Eredivisie. In addition to the league, the club entered the KNVB Cup, where they were eliminated in the first round by third-tier amateur side Quick Boys on 30 October 2024.

Almere City finished 18th in the Eredivisie with a record of four wins, 10 draws and 20 defeats and were relegated to the Eerste Divisie following a 1–1 home draw with Fortuna Sittard on 14 May 2025.

The campaign featured a mid-season change of head coach: Hedwiges Maduro—appointed in May 2024—was dismissed on 18 December 2024 after one league win in sixteen matches; he was succeeded in January 2025 by Jeroen Rijsdijk.

== Transfers ==
=== Out ===
Pos.	Player	Transferred to	Fee	Date	Source
FW	(Netherlands) Jason van Duiven	(Netherlands) PSV	Loan return	30 June 2024	
FW	(Democratic Republic of the Congo) Yann Kitala	(France) Le Havre	Loan return	30 June 2024	

== Friendlies ==
=== Pre-season ===
On June 4, 2024, Almere City released its schedule for pre-season matches, with training starting on June 22.

28 June 2024 Friendly	Almere City (Netherlands)	v	(Romania) FCSB
14:00

7 July 2024 Friendly	Almere City (Netherlands)	v	(Netherlands) Go Ahead Eagles

12 July 2024 Friendly	Almere City (Netherlands)	v	(Netherlands) SC Heerenveen

2 August 2024 Friendly	Almere City (Netherlands)	v	(France) Le Havre	Almere
				Stadium: Yanmar Stadion

== Competitions ==
=== Overall record ===
Competition	First match	Last match	Starting round	Record							
Competition	First match	Last match	Starting round	Pld	W	D	L	GF	GA	GD	Win %
Eredivisie	16–18 August 2024	May 2025	Matchday 1	0	0	0	0	0	0	+0	—
KNVB Cup				0	0	0	0	0	0	+0	—
Total				0	0	0	0	0	0	+0	—

Source: Competitions

=== Eredivisie ===
The schedule for the league fixtures was on 24 June 2024.

==== League table ====
Pos	Team	Pld	W	D	L	GF	GA	GD	Pts	Qualification or relegation
14	Heracles Almelo	34	9	11	14	42	63	−21	38	
15	NAC Breda	34	8	9	17	34	58	−24	33	
16	Willem II (R)	34	6	8	20	34	56	−22	26	Qualification for the Relegation play-off
17	RKC Waalwijk (R)	34	6	7	21	44	74	−30	25	Relegation to Eerste Divisie
18	Almere City (R)	34	4	10	20	23	64	−41	22	Relegation to Eerste Divisie

Source: Eredivisie
Rules for classification: 1) Points; 2) Goal difference; 3) Goals scored; 4) Head-to-head points; 5) Head-to-head goal difference; 6) Head-to-head away goals scored; 7) Play-off if relevant for deciding champion, relegation or participating in a European league, otherwise by draw. 8) Penalty shoot-out (only after a play-off)
(R) Relegated
