= Foeke Booy =

Dutch footballer, manager and sporting director (born 1962)

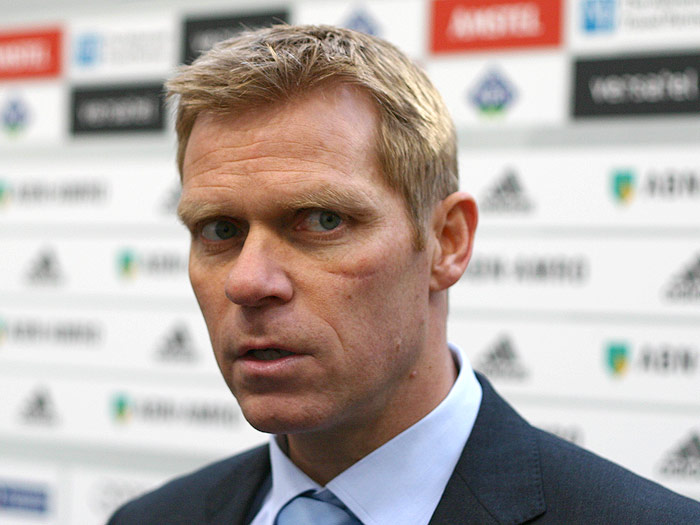

Personal information
- Date of birth: 25 April 1962 (age 64)
- Place of birth: Leeuwarden, Netherlands
- Position: Forward

Team information
- Current team: Almere City (head of scouting)

Senior career*
Years	Team	Apps	(Gls)
1980–1984	Cambuur	72	(8)
1984–1985	De Graafschap	34	(20)
1985–1987	PEC Zwolle	77	(37)
1987–1988	Groningen	29	(10)
1988–1989	Kortrijk	31	(8)
1989–1993	Club Brugge	111	(49)
1993–1994	Gent	28	(11)
1994–1996	Utrecht	26	(4)
Total		408	(147)

Managerial career
- 2000–2002: Utrecht (assistant)
- 2002–2007: Utrecht
- 2007: Al-Nassr
- 2007–2009: Sparta Rotterdam
- 2012–2013: Cercle Brugge
- 2013–2015: Go Ahead Eagles
- 2023–2024: Sparta Rotterdam (assistant)
- 2024–2025: Almere City (assistant)
- * Club domestic league appearances and goals

Foeke Booy (born 25 April 1962) is a Dutch former professional footballer player and manager who is the head of scouting for Eerste Divisie club Almere City. A forward during a sixteen-year playing career in the Netherlands and Belgium, he is best known for his successful managerial spell at Utrecht, where he won back-to-back KNVB Cups and the Johan Cruyff Shield between 2003 and 2004.

Booy began his career with hometown club Cambuur before playing for De Graafschap, PEC Zwolle and Groningen. He later spent five seasons in Belgium with Kortrijk, Club Brugge and Gent, winning two league titles and the Belgian Cup with Club Brugge, before finishing his career at Utrecht.

After retiring in 1996, Booy moved into coaching at Utrecht, progressing from youth roles to head coach in 2002. He subsequently managed Al-Nassr, Sparta Rotterdam, Cercle Brugge and Go Ahead Eagles, and later held senior technical positions at Cambuur and Almere City.

== Club career ==
Booy spent sixteen seasons as a professional footballer, representing eight clubs in the Netherlands and Belgium. He began his senior career with his hometown side Cambuur, before moving on to De Graafschap, PEC Zwolle and FC Groningen. In 1987 he left the Netherlands for Belgium, where he played for Kortrijk, Club Brugge and Gent.

His most successful spell came at Club Brugge, where he won two national championships and the Belgian Cup. In 1994 he returned to the Netherlands to join FC Utrecht, but a serious knee injury soon curtailed his playing time and ultimately brought an end to his career at the top level.

== Managerial and executive career ==
=== Early coaching career and success at Utrecht ===
Following his retirement at the age of 34, Booy moved into coaching at Utrecht. He initially managed the club's under-17 side, later took charge of Jong Utrecht, and spent two years as assistant coach with the first team. In 2002, he was appointed both technical manager and head coach.

Booy went on to become one of the most successful managers in Utrecht's history. In his first season in charge, the club challenged for European qualification before finishing eighth in the 2002–03 Eredivisie with 47 points. The campaign culminated in Utrecht's victory in the KNVB Cup, defeating Feyenoord 4–1 at De Kuip.

Despite the departure of several key players the following year, including Dirk Kuyt, Utrecht retained the cup, and their league points tally fell by only one compared with the previous season. In 2004, Booy guided the team to a third major trophy, as Utrecht defeated Ajax 4–2 at the Amsterdam ArenA to win the Johan Cruijff Schaal.

In July 2007, Booy signed a one-year contract to become manager of Saudi Arabian club Al-Nassr. He struggled to settle in Saudi Arabia and left the club in November of the same year.

On 18 December 2007, Booy was appointed head coach of Sparta Rotterdam. He remained in charge until the end of the 2008–09 season, after which he returned to FC Utrecht as director of football. His tenure ended in May 2012, when the club dismissed him from the role.

In November 2012, Booy was appointed manager of Belgian side Cercle Brugge. His spell in Bruges was brief, as he was dismissed in April 2013 following a run of poor results.

=== Go Ahead Eagles ===
On 23 June 2013, Booy was appointed head coach of newly promoted Eredivisie side Go Ahead Eagles, signing a one-year contract with an option for an additional season. In his first campaign he met the club's objective of retaining Eredivisie status, a season that included a 3–2 away win over Utrecht on 4 October 2014—their first league victory there since 1992. On 8 March 2015, the club announced that Booy would leave at the end of the season. The decision prompted criticism from sections of the support, who argued that he should depart immediately as the team was in the relegation zone. Following a 3–0 home defeat to Vitesse on 21 March, the board dismissed him the next day, with the side placed 17th in the table.

=== Return to executive roles and later coaching ===
On 24 November 2017, Booy returned to Cambuur as the club's new technical manager, more than three decades after beginning his playing career there in 1980. During his tenure, Cambuur secured promotion to the Eredivisie by winning the 2020–21 Eerste Divisie.

In July 2021, Booy suffered a stroke. While he underwent rehabilitation, financial director Gerald van den Belt assumed his responsibilities as technical director. Booy later returned to his post following a successful recovery. After Cambuur's relegation at the end of the 2022–23 season, the club informed him that his contract would not be renewed.

Booy joined Sparta Rotterdam as an assistant coach ahead of the 2023–24 season, but his employment came to an end a few months later following the dismissal of head coach Jeroen Rijsdijk. On 21 November 2024, he was appointed assistant coach to Hedwiges Maduro at Almere City, supporting Maduro in his first season as a head coach in professional football. After Maduro's dismissal in December 2024, Booy and Anoush Dastgir jointly assumed interim coaching duties. After Almere's relegation to the Eerste Divisie at the end of the 2024–25 season, Booy moved into a new position at the club as head of scouting.

== Personal life ==
Booy is married to Wendy Booy-de Ruiter, whom he met during his early playing years at Cambuur; the couple married in 1985 and have two daughters. His father-in-law was Nol de Ruiter, who was his manager at Cambuur when Booy met Wendy.

Booy and his family lived in several Dutch and Belgian cities during his playing and coaching career before settling in Houten, near Utrecht.

On 4 July 2021, Booy suffered a stroke at home and underwent subsequent hospital treatment and rehabilitation. He later returned to work and daily activities, though with reduced physical intensity.

== Honours ==
=== Manager ===
Utrecht

- KNVB Cup: 2002–03, 2003–04
- Johan Cruyff Shield: 2004
