= 2024–25 Eredivisie =

69th season of the Eredivisie

Eredivisie
- Season: 2024–25
- Dates: 9 August 2024 – 1 June 2025
- Champions: PSV Eindhoven (26th title)
- Relegated: Willem II; Almere City; RKC Waalwijk
- Champions League: PSV Eindhoven; Ajax; Feyenoord
- Europa League: Utrecht; Go Ahead Eagles (as cup winners)
- Conference League: AZ
- Matches: 306
- Goals: 914 (2.99 per match)
- Top goalscorer: Sem Steijn (24 goals)
- Biggest home win: AZ 9–1 Heerenveen (15 September 2024)
- Biggest away win: Almere City 1–7 PSV Eindhoven (24 August 2024)
- Highest scoring: AZ 9–1 Heerenveen (15 September 2024)
- Longest winning run: 10 matches PSV Eindhoven; Ajax
- Longest unbeaten run: 14 matches Ajax
- Longest winless run: 17 matches Willem II
- Longest losing run: 8 matches Willem II; RKC Waalwijk

The 2024–25 Eredivisie was the 69th season of Eredivisie, the premier football competition in the Netherlands. It began on 9 August 2024 and concluded on 1 June 2025.

PSV Eindhoven, who entered the last 5 weeks of the season 9 points behind Ajax, entered the last week ahead thanks to Ajax's point losses and defeated Sparta 3–1 in the last match of the league on May 18, 2025 and completed the league as champions for the 26th time.

== Changes ==
▲ from 2023–24 Eerste Divisie	▼ to 2024–25 Eerste Divisie
Willem II (promoted after a two season absence); Groningen (promoted after a single season absence); NAC Breda (Play-offs, promoted after a five season absence)	Excelsior (Play-offs, relegated after two seasons in top flight); Volendam (relegated after two seasons in top flight); Vitesse (relegated after 35 seasons in top flight)

This was the last season with artificial turf being legal. Since this season there are no clubs anymore that play on artificial turf, all clubs play on natural grass or hybrid grass. As per next season, natural/hybrid grass on the home ground stadium pitch, is obliged in the Eredivisie.

== Teams ==
Locations of the 2024–25 Eredivisie teams
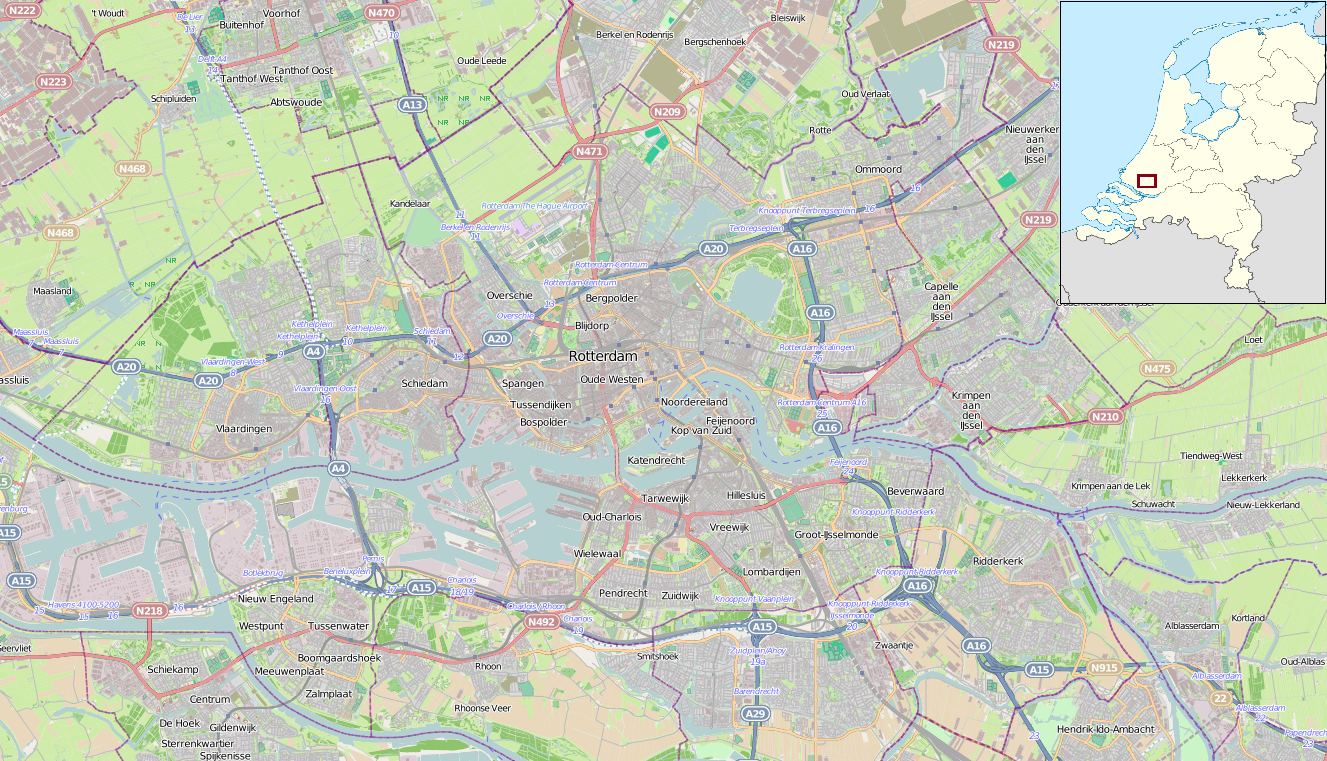
Rotterdam Eredivisie football clubs

=== Stadiums and locations ===
Club	Location	Venue	Capacity	2023–24 position
Ajax	Amsterdam	Johan Cruyff Arena	55,865	5th
Almere City	Almere	Yanmar Stadion	4,501	13th
AZ	Alkmaar	AFAS Stadion	19,478	4th
Feyenoord	Rotterdam	De Kuip	47,500	2nd
Fortuna Sittard	Sittard	Fortuna Sittard Stadion	10,300	10th
Go Ahead Eagles	Deventer	De Adelaarshorst	10,000	9th
Groningen	Groningen	Euroborg	22,550	1D, 2nd
Heerenveen	Heerenveen	Abe Lenstra Stadion	27,224	11th
Heracles Almelo	Almelo	Asito Stadion	12,080	14th
NAC Breda	Breda	Rat Verlegh Stadion	19,000	1D, 8th (Play-off winner)
NEC	Nijmegen	Goffertstadion	12,500	6th
PEC Zwolle	Zwolle	MAC³PARK Stadion	13,250	12th
PSV Eindhoven	Eindhoven	Philips Stadion	36,500	1st
RKC Waalwijk	Waalwijk	Mandemakers Stadion	7,500	15th
Sparta Rotterdam	Rotterdam	Spartastadion Het Kasteel	11,000	8th
Twente	Enschede	De Grolsch Veste	30,205	3rd
Utrecht	Utrecht	Stadion Galgenwaard	23,750	7th
Willem II	Tilburg	Koning Willem II Stadion	14,700	1D, 1st

=== Number of teams by province ===
Number of teams	Province	Team(s)
4	North Brabant	NAC Breda, PSV Eindhoven, RKC Waalwijk, Willem II
4	Overijssel	Go Ahead Eagles, Heracles Almelo, PEC Zwolle, Twente
2	North Holland	Ajax, AZ
2	South Holland	Feyenoord, Sparta Rotterdam
1	Flevoland	Almere City
1	Friesland	Heerenveen
1	Gelderland	NEC
1	Groningen	Groningen
1	Limburg	Fortuna Sittard
1	Utrecht	Utrecht

=== Personnel and kits ===
Note: Flags indicate national team as has been defined under FIFA eligibility rules. Players and managers may hold more than one non-FIFA nationality.

Team	President	Manager	Captain	Kit manufacturer	Shirt sponsors (front)	Shirt sponsors (back)	Shirt sponsors (sleeves)	Shorts sponsors
Ajax	(Netherlands) Menno Geelen (int. before April 2025)	(Italy) Francesco Farioli	(England) Jordan Henderson	Adidas	Ziggo	Ziggo Sport	Curaçao/ Team Rockstars IT (from January 2025)	None
Almere City	(Netherlands) John Bes	(Netherlands) Jeroen Rijsdijk	(France) Thomas Robinet	Craft	OneCasino	Kroonenberg Groep, MASCOT Workwear	eFulfilment.eu	None
AZ	(Netherlands) Merijn Zeeman (per Dec. 2024, before (Netherlands) Robert Eenhoorn)	(Belgium) Maarten Martens	(Netherlands) Bruno Martins Indi	Nike	Kansino	Elfi Vastgoed	Cavallaro Napoli	None
Feyenoord	(Netherlands) Dennis te Kloese	(Netherlands) Robin van Persie	(Netherlands) Quinten Timber	Castore	Mediamarkt	Prijsvrij	TOTO Nederlandse Loterij	None
Fortuna Sittard	(Turkey) Işıtan Gün	(Netherlands) Danny Buijs	(Portugal) Ivo Pinto	Robey	BetCity	Winkelhart sittard	None	None
Go Ahead Eagles	(Netherlands) Jan Willem van Dop	(Netherlands) Paul Simonis	(Netherlands) Mats Deijl	Stanno	Betnation, MaxiZoo	Validsign, Salland Zorgverzekeringen	LoooX, Matrix Fitness	MaxiZoo
Groningen	(Netherlands) Frank van Mosselveld	(Netherlands) Dick Lukkien	(Curaçao) Leandro Bacuna	Robey	OG Clean Fuels	U-Sport	TOTO Nederlandse Loterij	None
Heerenveen	(Netherlands) Ferry de Haan	(Netherlands) Robin Veldman	(Poland) Paweł Bochniewicz	Macron	Wolkom onbegrensd Fryslân	MASCOT Workwear, Effektief	TOTO Nederlandse Loterij	Veolia
Heracles Almelo	(Netherlands) Bart Haverland	(Netherlands) Erwin van de Looi	(Netherlands) Justin Hoogma	Acerbis	Asito	Asito	Kans voor een Kind	Asito
NAC Breda	(Netherlands) Remco Oversier	(Belgium) Carl Hoefkens	(Belgium) Jan Van den Bergh	Nike	OK Brandstoffen en Smeermiddelen	Vrolijk, MHC Mobility	vdBuijs Installaties, Jacobs Elektro Groep	Xior Student Housing
NEC	(Netherlands) Wilco van Schaik	(Netherlands) Rogier Meijer	(Indonesia) Calvin Verdonk	Robey	Nexperia	KlokGroep	NasWerkt	GX Software
PEC Zwolle	(Netherlands) Xander Czaikowski	(Netherlands) Johnny Jansen	(Netherlands) Davy van den Berg	Adidas	Circus.nl Sport & Casino	Molecaten	VDK Groep	Quades
PSV Eindhoven	(Netherlands) Marcel Brands	(Netherlands) Peter Bosz	(Netherlands) Luuk de Jong	Puma	Metropoolregio Brainport Eindhoven	GoodHabitz	TOTO Nederlandse Loterij	None
RKC Waalwijk	(Netherlands) Willem van der Linden	(Netherlands) Henk Fraser	(Poland) Oskar Zawada	Stanno	Willy Naessens, JM van Delft & zn	Mandemakers, Van Mossel	TOTO Nederlandse Loterij	DAS Bouwsystemen
Sparta Rotterdam	(Netherlands) Leo Ruijs	(Netherlands) Maurice Steijn	(Netherlands) Nick Olij	Robey	De Goudse Verzekeringen, D&S Group	Blue10, VNOM	TOTO Nederlandse Loterij, BICT Groep	Toll Global Forwarding, Trofi Pack
Twente	(Netherlands) Paul van der Kraan	(Netherlands) Joseph Oosting	(Netherlands) Ricky van Wolfswinkel / (Germany) Lars Unnerstall	Castore	Elektramat	ThermoSolutions BV	TOTO Nederlandse Loterij, Taurus Corporate Finance	Elektramat
Utrecht	(Netherlands) Thijs van Es	(Netherlands) Ron Jans	(Netherlands) Nick Viergever	Castore	Conclusion Digital Transformation	None	U4U	Dassy
Willem II	(Netherlands) Merijn Goris	(Belgium) Kristof Aelbrecht (a.i.)	(Netherlands) Jesse Bosch	Robey	AVEC	BTT We lead the way	TOTO Nederlandse Loterij	Avia

=== Managerial changes ===
Team	Outgoing manager	Manner of departure	Date of vacancy	Position in table	Replaced by	Date of appointment
Feyenoord	(Netherlands) Arne Slot	Signed by Liverpool	1 June 2024	Pre-season	(Denmark) Brian Priske	1 July 2024
Ajax	(Netherlands) John van 't Schip	End of interim spell	10 June 2024	Pre-season	(Italy) Francesco Farioli	11 June 2024
Almere City	(Netherlands) Alex Pastoor	End of contract	30 June 2024	Pre-season	(Netherlands) Hedwiges Maduro	1 July 2024
Heerenveen	(Netherlands) Kees van Wonderen	End of contract	30 June 2024	Pre-season	(Netherlands) Robin van Persie	1 July 2024
NAC Breda	(Netherlands) Jean-Paul van Gastel	End of contract	30 June 2024	Pre-season	(Belgium) Carl Hoefkens	1 July 2024
Go Ahead Eagles	(Netherlands) René Hake	Signed by Manchester United as Assistant	11 July	Pre-season	(Netherlands) Paul Simonis	7 July 2024
Sparta Rotterdam	(Netherlands) Jeroen Rijsdijk	Sacked	1 November 2024	11th	(Morocco) Nourdin Boukhari (a.i.)	1 November 2024
Sparta Rotterdam	(Morocco) Nourdin Boukhari (a.i.)	End of interim spell	4 November 2024	13th	(Netherlands) Maurice Steijn	4 November 2024
Almere City	(Netherlands) Hedwiges Maduro	Sacked	18 December 2024	18th	(Netherlands) Foeke Booy (a.i.) & (Afghanistan) Anoush Dastgir (a.i.)	19 December 2024
Almere City	(Netherlands) Foeke Booy (a.i.) & (Afghanistan) Anoush Dastgir (a.i.)	End of interim spell	3 January 2025	18th	(Netherlands) Jeroen Rijsdijk	3 January 2025
Feyenoord	(Denmark) Brian Priske	Sacked	10 February 2025	5th	(Netherlands) Pascal Bosschaart (a.i.)	11 February 2025
Heerenveen	(Netherlands) Robin van Persie	Signed by Feyenoord	23 February 2025	9th	(Netherlands) Henk Brugge (a.i.)	23 February 2025
Feyenoord	(Netherlands) Pascal Bosschaart (a.i.)	End of interim spell	23 February 2025	3rd	(Netherlands) Robin van Persie	24 February 2025
Heerenveen	(Netherlands) Henk Brugge (a.i.)	End of interim spell	23 March 2025	10th	(Netherlands) Robin Veldman	21 March 2025
Willem II	(Belgium) Peter Maes	Sacked	30 April 2025	16th	(Belgium) Kristof Aelbrecht (a.i.)	30 April 2025

== Standings ==
=== League table ===
Pos	Team	Pld	W	D	L	GF	GA	GD	Pts	Qualification or relegation
1	PSV Eindhoven (C)	34	25	4	5	103	39	+64	79	Qualification for the Champions League league phase
2	Ajax	34	24	6	4	67	32	+35	78	Qualification for the Champions League league phase
3	Feyenoord	34	20	8	6	76	38	+38	68	Qualification for the Champions League third qualifying round
4	Utrecht	34	18	10	6	62	45	+17	64	Qualification for the Europa League second qualifying round
5	AZ (O)	34	16	9	9	58	37	+21	57	Qualification for the European competition play-offs
6	Twente	34	15	9	10	62	49	+13	54	Qualification for the European competition play-offs
7	Go Ahead Eagles	34	14	9	11	57	55	+2	51	Qualification for the Europa League league phase (Note: Qualified for the Europa League league phase as the 2024–25 KNVB Cup winners.)
8	NEC	34	12	7	15	51	46	+5	43	Qualification for the European competition play-offs
9	Heerenveen	34	12	7	15	42	57	−15	43	Qualification for the European competition play-offs
10	PEC Zwolle	34	10	11	13	43	51	−8	41	
11	Fortuna Sittard	34	11	8	15	37	54	−17	41	
12	Sparta Rotterdam	34	9	12	13	39	43	−4	39	
13	Groningen	34	10	9	15	40	53	−13	39	
14	Heracles Almelo	34	9	11	14	42	63	−21	38	
15	NAC Breda	34	8	9	17	34	58	−24	33	
16	Willem II (R)	34	6	8	20	34	56	−22	26	Qualification for the Relegation play-off
17	RKC Waalwijk (R)	34	6	7	21	44	74	−30	25	Relegation to Eerste Divisie
18	Almere City (R)	34	4	10	20	23	64	−41	22	Relegation to Eerste Divisie

Source: Eredivisie
Rules for classification: 1) Points; 2) Goal difference; 3) Goals scored; 4) Head-to-head points; 5) Head-to-head goal difference; 6) Head-to-head away goals scored; 7) Play-off if relevant for deciding champion, relegation or participating in a European league, otherwise by draw. 8) Penalty shoot-out (only after a play-off)
(C) Champions; (O) Play-off winners; (R) Relegated

== Results ==
Home \ Away	AJA	ALM	AZ	FEY	FOR	GAE	GRO	HEE	HER	NAC	NEC	PEC	PSV	RKC	SPA	TWE	UTR	WIL
Ajax		3–0	2–2	2–1	5–0	2–0	3–1	1–0	4–0	3–1	0–3	2–0	3–2	2–1	1–1	2–0	2–2	1–0
Almere City	0–1		0–1	1–4	1–1	0–0	1–1	3–0	0–2	1–1	1–0	2–2	1–7	1–4	0–3	0–5	1–3	0–1
AZ	2–1	1–1		0–1	1–0	2–2	3–0	9–1	1–0	1–1	1–0	2–0	1–2	2–2	1–2	1–0	1–2	1–2
Feyenoord	0–2	2–1	3–2		1–1	3–2	4–1	3–0	5–2	2–0	0–0	4–0	2–3	2–0	3–0	2–1	1–2	1–1
Fortuna Sittard	0–2	3–0	1–0	0–2		0–3	1–0	3–0	1–0	1–0	0–3	1–4	1–3	3–2	0–3	1–2	0–0	1–0
Go Ahead Eagles	1–1	3–0	0–3	1–5	0–2		2–1	1–0	4–1	2–1	5–0	2–2	3–2	2–0	1–0	2–2	2–2	1–0
Groningen	2–2	0–0	0–0	2–2	1–0	0–1		1–0	4–1	4–1	2–1	0–0	1–3	6–1	1–0	1–1	0–1	2–0
Heerenveen	0–2	2–1	3–1	2–0	2–2	1–0	2–1		1–1	4–0	1–0	1–1	1–0	1–1	2–0	3–3	1–1	3–1
Heracles Almelo	3–4	0–0	1–0	1–4	2–2	4–2	1–1	2–1		2–0	1–2	4–2	1–3	2–2	1–1	2–1	1–1	1–1
NAC Breda	2–1	1–0	1–2	0–0	1–0	1–1	1–1	2–4	1–1		1–0	1–3	0–3	4–1	1–1	2–1	1–2	1–1
NEC	1–2	2–2	3–3	1–1	4–1	2–3	6–0	3–0	1–2	3–0		1–0	3–3	2–1	1–1	1–2	1–2	1–1
PEC Zwolle	0–1	1–0	1–2	1–5	3–1	1–1	2–0	1–1	3–0	1–2	0–1		3–1	2–0	1–0	1–1	3–3	0–1
PSV	0–2	5–0	2–2	3–0	4–1	3–0	5–0	2–1	4–1	3–2	2–0	6–0		5–1	2–1	6–1	2–2	1–1
RKC Waalwijk	0–2	2–0	0–3	2–3	1–2	5–3	1–2	3–1	0–0	5–0	0–3	1–1	0–3		1–2	2–2	0–4	2–0
Sparta Rotterdam	0–2	2–2	1–2	1–1	1–1	1–2	1–0	3–1	0–0	0–2	2–0	1–1	1–3	1–1		0–2	1–4	4–0
Twente	2–2	1–0	2–3	2–6	1–1	3–2	2–0	2–0	5–0	1–0	2–0	1–1	1–3	2–0	1–1		2–0	6–2
Utrecht	4–0	0–1	0–0	0–2	2–5	3–3	3–1	2–0	1–0	1–0	0–1	1–0	2–5	3–2	1–1	2–1		3–2
Willem II	1–2	0–2	0–2	1–1	0–0	2–0	1–3	1–2	1–2	2–2	4–1	1–2	0–2	3–0	1–2	0–1	2–3	

Source: Flashscore
Legend: Blue = home team win; Yellow = draw; Red = away team win.
For upcoming matches, an "a" indicates there is an article about the rivalry between the two participants.

== Play-offs ==
All times Central European Summer Time (UTC+2)

=== European competition play-offs ===
==== Bracket ====
Semi-finals
5	AZ	4
9	Heerenveen	1
6	Twente (a.e.t.)	3
8	NEC	2

Final
5	AZ	3
6	Twente	2

==== Semi-finals ====
22 May 2025
18:45

AZ	4–1	Heerenveen
Meerdink 3', 21', 45'; Penetra 66'	Report	Nicolaescu 74'

AFAS Stadion, Alkmaar
Attendance: 12,007
Referee: Marc Nagtegaal
22 May 2025
21:00

Twente	3–2 (a.e.t.)	NEC
Sadílek 16'; Steijn 62'; Taha 94'	Report	Sano 47'; Van Crooij 58'

De Grolsch Veste, Enschede
Attendance: 27,000
Referee: Sander van der Eijk

==== Final ====
25 May 2025
18:00

AZ	3–2	Twente
Meerdink 43'; Van Bommel 53'; Sadiq 90+4'	Report	Steijn 22' (pen.), 40'

AFAS Stadion, Alkmaar
Attendance: 14,154
Referee: Serdar Gözübüyük

=== Promotion/relegation play-offs ===
==== Bracket ====
First round
Dordrecht	0	2	2
De Graafschap	0	0	0
ADO Den Haag	0	0	0
Telstar	2	1	3
Cambuur	0	1	1
Den Bosch (a.e.t.)	1	1	2

Semi-finals
Willem II (p)	1	3	4 (5)
Dordrecht	2	2	4 (4)
Telstar (a.e.t.)	0	2	2
Den Bosch	0	1	1

Final
Willem II	2	1	3
Telstar	2	3	5

==== First round ====
12 May 2025
20:00

Den Bosch	1–0	Cambuur
Doumtsios 20'	Report

De Vliert, 's-Hertogenbosch
Attendance: 6,500
Referee: Alex Bos
16 May 2025
20:00

Cambuur	1–1 (a.e.t.)	Den Bosch
Diemers 61'	Report	Barglan 113'

Kooi Stadion, Leeuwarden
Attendance: 14,027
Referee: Jannick van der Laan

Den Bosch won 2–1 on aggregate.

13 May 2025
18:45

Telstar	2–0	ADO Den Haag
El Kachati 5'; Bakker 45+1'	Report

711 Stadion, Velsen-Zuid
Attendance: 4,177
Referee: Rob Dieperink
17 May 2025
16:30

ADO Den Haag	0–1	Telstar
	Report	El Kachati 71'

Bingoal Stadion, The Hague
Attendance: 8,793
Referee: Marc Nagtegaal

Telstar won 3–0 on aggregate.

13 May 2025
21:00

De Graafschap	0–0	FC Dordrecht
	Report

De Vijverberg, Doetinchem
Attendance: 12,600
Referee: Martijn Vos
17 May 2025
21:00

Dordrecht	2–0	De Graafschap
Parlanti 68'; Slory 87'	Report

M-Scores Stadion, Dordrecht
Attendance: 4,100
Referee: Robin Hensgens

Dordrecht won 2–0 on aggregate.

==== Semi-finals ====
20 May 2025
20:00

Den Bosch	0–0	Telstar
	Report

De Vliert, 's-Hertogenbosch
Attendance: 6,737
Referee: Allard Lindhout
23 May 2025
20:00

Telstar	2–1 (a.e.t.)	Den Bosch
El Kachati 30' (pen.); Bakker 109'	Report	Van Grunsven 18'

711 Stadion, Velsen-Zuid
Attendance: 4,077
Referee: Bas Nijhuis

Telstar won 2–1 on aggregate.

21 May 2025
18:45

Dordrecht	2–1	Willem II
Haen 19'; Valk 28'	Report	Meerveld 35'

M-Scores Stadion, Dordrecht
Attendance: 4,100
Referee: Rob Dieperink
24 May 2025
20:00

Willem II	3–2 (a.e.t.)	Dordrecht
St. Jago 3'; Mathijsen 7'; Lambert 43'	Report	Slory 16'; Ezeb 80'
Penalties
Vaesen (penalty scored); Sandra (penalty scored); Kaygin (penalty scored); Lambert (penalty scored); Bosch (penalty scored)	5–4	Schuurman (penalty scored); Kotzebue (penalty scored); Van der Sluijs (penalty scored); M'Bemba (penalty scored); Igor (penalty missed)

Koning Willem II Stadion, Tilburg
Attendance: 13,200
Referee: Dennis Higler

4–4 on aggregate. Willem II won 5–4 on penalties.

==== Final ====
29 May 2025
20:00

Telstar	2–2	Willem II
Sigurgeirsson 56' (o.g.); El Kachati 65'	Report	Meerveld 14'; Kehrer 81'

711 Stadion, Velsen-Zuid
Attendance: 4,177
Referee: Jeroen Manschot
1 June 2025
18:00

Willem II	1–3	Telstar
Nizet 17'	Report	Kaandorp 6', 58'; El Kachati 12'

Koning Willem II Stadion, Tilburg
Attendance: 14,500
Referee: Danny Makkelie

Telstar won 5–3 on aggregate.

== Statistics ==
=== Top scorers ===
Rank	Player	Club	Goals
1	(Netherlands) Sem Steijn	Twente	24
2	(Brazil) Igor Paixão	Feyenoord	16
3	(Netherlands) Luuk de Jong	PSV Eindhoven	14
3	(Republic of Ireland) Troy Parrott	AZ	14
5	(Suriname) Dylan Vente	PEC Zwolle	13
6	(Norway) Oliver Edvardsen	Go Ahead Eagles / Ajax	12
6	(United States) Malik Tillman	PSV Eindhoven	12
8	(Netherlands) Noa Lang	PSV Eindhoven	11
8	(United States) Ricardo Pepi	PSV Eindhoven	11
8	(Morocco) Ismael Saibari	PSV Eindhoven	11

=== Hat-tricks ===
Rnd	Player	Club	Goals	Date	Home	Score	Away
5	(Republic of Ireland) Troy Parrott^{4}	AZ	23', 48', 50', 56'	14 September 2024	AZ	9–1	Heerenveen
13	(United States) Ricardo Pepi	PSV Eindhoven	37', 64', 78'	23 November 2024	PSV Eindhoven	5–0	Groningen
15	(Norway) Oliver Edvardsen	Go Ahead Eagles	5', 6', 25'	7 December 2024	Go Ahead Eagles	5–0	NEC
16	(Mexico) Santiago Giménez	Feyenoord	31', 36' (p), 45+3'	14 December 2024	Feyenoord	5–2	Heracles Almelo
18	(Denmark) Jakob Breum	Go Ahead Eagles	27', 47', 87'	10 January 2025	Fortuna Sittard	0–3	Go Ahead Eagles
18	(Netherlands) Sem Steijn	Twente	12', 36', 50' (p)	12 January 2025	Twente	6–2	Willem II
26	(Brazil) Igor Paixão	Feyenoord	14', 53', 62'	16 March 2025	Twente	2–6	Feyenoord
31	(Croatia) Ivan Perišić	PSV Eindhoven	15', 40', 73'	3 May 2025	PSV Eindhoven	4–1	Fortuna Sittard

Notes

^{4} Player scored 4 goals

== Awards ==
=== Monthly awards ===
Month	Player of the Month		Talent of the Month		Team of the Month	Ref.
Month	Player	Club	Player	Club	Team of the Month	Ref.
August	Joey Veerman	PSV Eindhoven	Jorg Schreuders	Groningen	Vaessen (Groningen); Köhlert (Heerenveen), Boscagli (PSV Eindhoven), Flamingo (PSV Eindhoven), Ledezma (PSV Eindhoven); Meerveld (Willem II), Veerman (PSV Eindhoven), Schreuders (Groningen); Lozano (PSV Eindhoven), Lammers (Twente), Bakayoko (PSV Eindhoven)	
September	Sem Steijn	Twente	Matteo Dams	PSV Eindhoven	Schendelaar (PEC Zwolle); Dams (PSV Eindhoven), Baas (Ajax), Šutalo (Ajax), Rensch (Ajax); Nassoh (Sparta Rotterdam), Steijn (Twente), Klaassen (Ajax); Tillman (PSV Eindhoven), Parrott (AZ), Sadiq (AZ)	
October	Thomas Didillon-Hödl	Willem II	Oscar Fraulo	Utrecht	Didillon-Hödl (Willem II); Salah-Eddine (Twente), Viergever (Utrecht), Nauber (Go Ahead Eagles), Kasius (AZ); Vlap (Twente), Hwang (Feyenoord), Steijn (Twente), Leemans (NAC Breda); Ómarsson (NAC Breda), Kulenović (Heracles Almelo)	
November	Dylan Mbayo	PEC Zwolle	Paxten Aaronson	Utrecht	Pasveer (Ajax); Verdonk (NEC), Kramer (Go Ahead Eagles), Greiml (NAC Breda), Pereira (NEC); Vlap (Twente), Saibari (PSV Eindhoven), Aaronson (Utrecht); Mbayo (PEC Zwolle), Pepi (PSV Eindhoven), Moussa (Feyenoord)	
December	Troy Parrott	AZ	Wouter Goes	AZ	Schendelaar (PEC Zwolle); Ledezma (PSV Eindhoven), Goes (AZ), Schouten (Willem II), Zagaritis (Almere City); Iqbal (Utrecht), Meerveld (Willem II); Edvardsen (Go Ahead Eagles), Zawada (RKC Waalwijk), Parrott (AZ), Lang (PSV Eindhoven)	
January	Filip Krastev	PEC Zwolle	Faissal Al Mazyani	RKC Waalwijk	De Keijzer (Heracles Almelo); Al Mazyani (RKC Waalwijk), Van Gelderen (RKC Waalwijk), Blokzijl (Groningen), Verdonk (NEC); Mito (Sparta Rotterdam), Van Crooij (NEC), Krastev (PEC Zwolle); Rots (Twente), Ómarsson (NAC Breda), Paixão (Feyenoord)	
February	Brian Brobbey	Ajax	Jakob Breum	Go Ahead Eagles	Barkas (Utrecht); Van Rooij (Twente), Penetra (AZ), Eerdhuijzen (Sparta Rotterdam), Møller Wolfe (AZ); Jahanbakhsh (Heerenveen), Breum (Go Ahead Eagles), Ihattaren (RKC Waalwijk); Vente (PEC Zwolle), Brobbey (Ajax), Gürbüz (Heerenveen)	
March	Igor Paixão	Feyenoord	Marvin Young	Sparta Rotterdam	Roefs (NEC); Bakari (Sparta Rotterdam), Young (Sparta Rotterdam), Eerdhuijzen (Sparta Rotterdam), El Karouani (Utrecht); Iqbal (Utrecht), Taylor (Ajax); Antman (Go Ahead Eagles), Edvardsen (Go Ahead Eagles), Paixão (Feyenoord); Hornkamp (Heracles Almelo)	
April	Miguel Rodríguez	Utrecht	Givairo Read	Feyenoord	Wellenreuther (Feyenoord); Read (Feyenoord), Deijl (Go Ahead Eagles), Šutalo (Ajax), El Karouani (Utrecht); Balard (NAC Breda), Saibari (PSV Eindhoven); Rodríguez (Utrecht), Paixão (Feyenoord), Cathline (Utrecht); Haller (Utrecht)	
May	Ivan Perišić	PSV Eindhoven	Wouter Goes	AZ	Roefs (NEC); Pereira (NEC), Goes (AZ), Penetra (AZ), Møller Wolfe (AZ); Namli (PEC Zwolle), Mijnans (AZ Alkmaar), Tillman (PSV Eindhoven); Perišić (PSV Eindhoven), Linssen (NEC), Lang (PSV Eindhoven)	

=== Annual awards ===
Award	Player	Club	Ref.
Player of the Season	(Netherlands) Sem Steijn	Twente	
Talent of the Season	(Netherlands) Jorrel Hato	Ajax	
Goal of the Season	(Netherlands) Bryan Linssen	NEC	

Team of the Season
Goalkeeper	(Netherlands) Remko Pasveer (Ajax)			
Defenders	(France) Olivier Boscagli (PSV)	(Slovakia) Dávid Hancko (Feyenoord)	(Croatia) Josip Šutalo (Ajax)	(Netherlands) Jorrel Hato (Ajax)
Midfielders	(Netherlands) Kenneth Taylor (Ajax)		(Netherlands) Sem Steijn (FC Twente)	(United States) Malik Tillman (PSV)
Forwards	(Netherlands) Noa Lang (PSV)		(Finland) Oliver Antman (Go Ahead Eagles)	(Netherlands) Luuk de Jong (PSV)

== Attendances ==
#	Football club	Average attendance
1	Ajax	54,280
2	Feyenoord	47,235
3	PSV Eindhoven	34,068
4	Twente	29,662
5	Heerenveen	23,389
6	Groningen	22,241
7	Utrecht	20,658
8	NAC Breda	18,637
9	AZ	17,917
10	PEC Zwolle	13,615
11	Willem II	13,158
12	NEC	12,605
13	Heracles Almelo	11,773
14	Fortuna Sittard	10,551
15	Go Ahead Eagles	9,912
16	Sparta Rotterdam	9,979
17	RKC Waalwijk	6,856
18	Almere City	3,382
