= Tyrese Noslin =

Dutch-Curaçaoan footballer (born 2002)

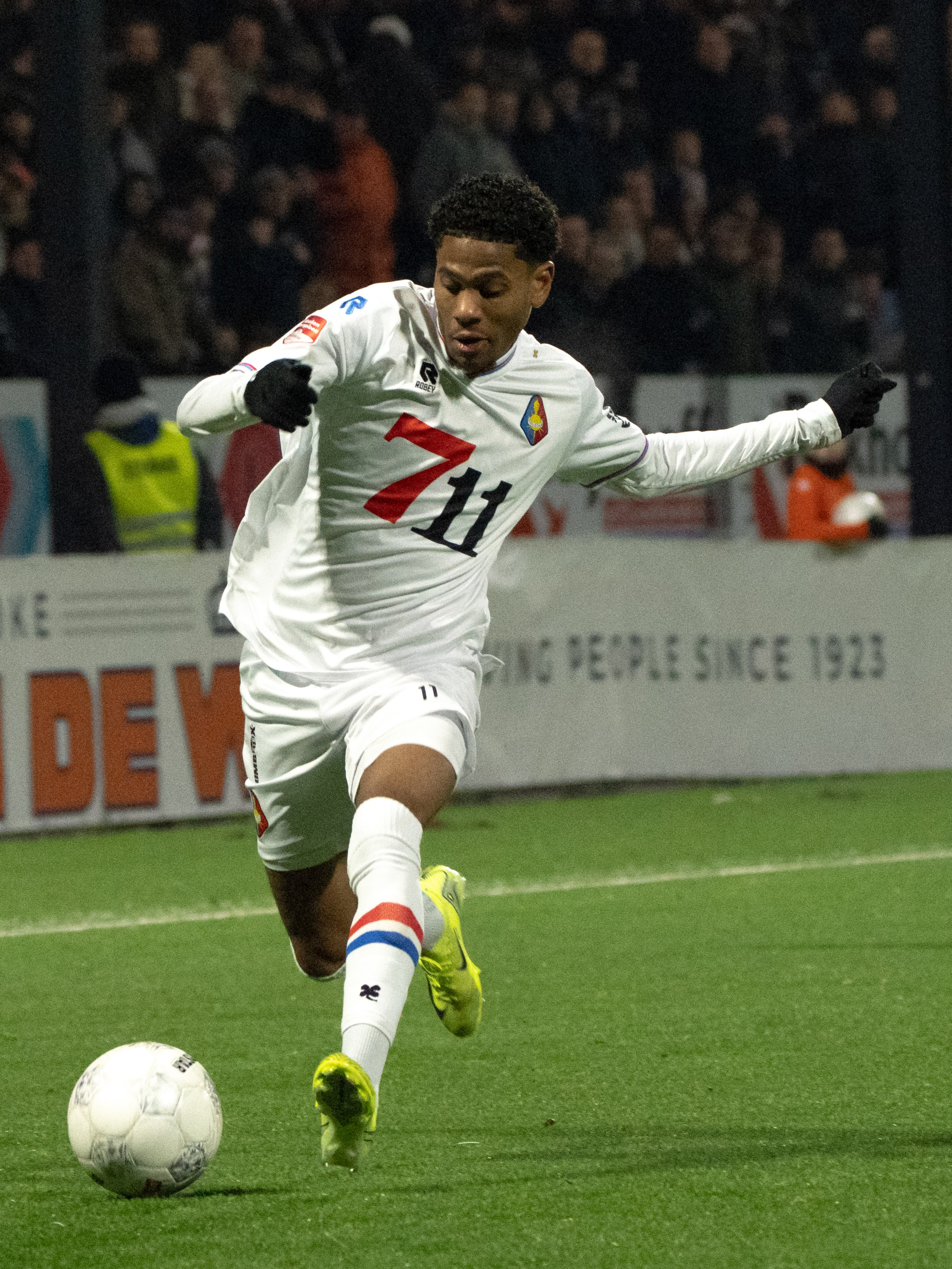
- Noslin in 2024

Personal information
- Full name: Tyrese Yurvencey Noslin
- Date of birth: 11 September 2002 (age 24)
- Place of birth: Amsterdam, Netherlands
- Height: 1.82 m (6 ft 0 in)
- Positions: Right-back; right midfielder

Team information
- Current team: Barnsley
- Number: 11

Youth career
- SV Almere
- Feyenoord
- –2011: Zeeburgia
- 2011–2012: Ajax
- 2012–2022: Almere City

Senior career*
Years	Team	Apps	(Gls)
2020–2024	Jong Almere City	23	(3)
2024–2026	Telstar	66	(5)
2026–	Barnsley	11	(0)

International career^{‡}
2020	Curaçao U20	3	(1)
2025–	Curaçao	9	(1)
- * Club domestic league appearances and goals as of 16:33, 24 October 2026 (UTC) ‡ National team caps and goals as of 27 September 2026

Tyrese Yurvencey Noslin (born 11 September 2002) is a professional footballer who plays as a right-back or right midfielder for EFL League One club Barnsley. Born in the Netherlands, he plays for the Curaçao national team.

== Club career ==
=== Early years ===
Noslin was born in Amsterdam on 11 September 2002, but moved with his family to Almere at an early age. He grew up in Almere Haven, living with his parents, younger brother, and two sisters. Noslin attended primary school at De Ark in Almere Haven. Reflecting on his childhood, he recalled: "I actually had quite a few hobbies besides football. I wanted to become a professional footballer early on, and when we played in the neighbourhood, I was always Ronaldinho. I'm still a real Messi fan." His early passion for football led him to join local club SV Almere, where he began his youth career.

Noslin's potential was quickly recognised, and he joined the youth academies of Feyenoord and later Zeeburgia before being scouted by Ajax. He spent one year in the Ajax system before transferring to Almere City in 2012. There, he progressed through the academy ranks over the following decade. In the 2023–24 season, Noslin became a key player for Jong Almere, the club's reserve side in the Tweede Divisie, scoring three goals in 22 matches that season.

=== Telstar ===
On 8 August 2024, Noslin signed a one-year contract with an option for a second season at Telstar, competing in the Eerste Divisie. He made his professional debut on 26 August 2024 as a substitute in a 2–0 home win over Jong PSV. Noslin scored his first professional goal on 27 October 2024, netting the winner in a 1–0 victory away to Emmen. Operating primarily as a right wing-back, Noslin became a regular starter during the 2024–25 season, making 32 league appearances and scoring three goals. On 27 March 2025, the club exercised the option in his deal, extending his contract to 2026. Telstar achieved promotion to the Eredivisie via the play-offs, returning to the top flight for the first time in 47 years.

Noslin made his Eredivisie debut on 10 August 2025, starting in a 2–0 defeat away to Ajax at the Johan Cruyff Arena. He scored his first goal in the competition on 5 October, netting in a 2–1 away defeat to AZ.

=== Barnsley ===
On 14 July 2026, Noslin signed a three-year contract with EFL League One club Barnsley, with a club option of a further year.

== International career ==
Noslin is eligible to represent Curaçao through his heritage and played for the Curaçao national under-20 team in 2020. He took part in the 2020 CONCACAF U-20 Championship qualifiers, where he made an immediate impact by scoring in a 5–0 victory over Saint Martin.

On 18 May 2026, he was named by head coach Dick Advocaat in the 26-man squad for the 2026 FIFA World Cup, marking the country's first-ever appearance at the tournament.

== Career statistics ==
=== Club ===
As of match played 24 October 2026

Appearances and goals by club, season and competition
Club	Season	League			KNVB Cup		Other		Total	
Club	Season	Division	Apps	Goals	Apps	Goals	Apps	Goals	Apps	Goals
Jong Almere City	2019–20	Derde Divisie	1	0	—		—		1	0
Jong Almere City	2023–24	Tweede Divisie	22	3	—		—		22	3
Jong Almere City	Total		23	3	—		—		23	3
Telstar	2024–25	Eerste Divisie	32	3	2	0	6 (Note: Appearances in Eredivisie promotion/relegation playoffs)	0	40	3
Telstar	2025–26	Eredivisie	34	2	5	1	—		39	3
Telstar	Total		66	5	7	1	6	0	79	6
Barnsley	2026–27	EFL League One	11	0	0	0	2 (Note: Appearances in EFL Cup)	1	13	1
Career total			100	8	7	1	8	1	115	10

=== International ===
As of match played 27 September 2026

Appearances and goals by national team and year
National team	Year	Apps	Goals
Curaçao	2025	3	1
Curaçao	2026	6	0
Total		9	1

Scores and results list Curaçao's goal tally first, score column indicates score after each Noslin goal.

List of international goals scored by Tyrese Noslin
No.	Date	Venue	Opponent	Score	Result	Competition
1	10 September 2025	Ergilio Hato Stadium, Willemstad, Curaçao	Bermuda	3–2	3–2	2026 FIFA World Cup qualification
