= Achraf Douiri =

Dutch footballer (born 1999)

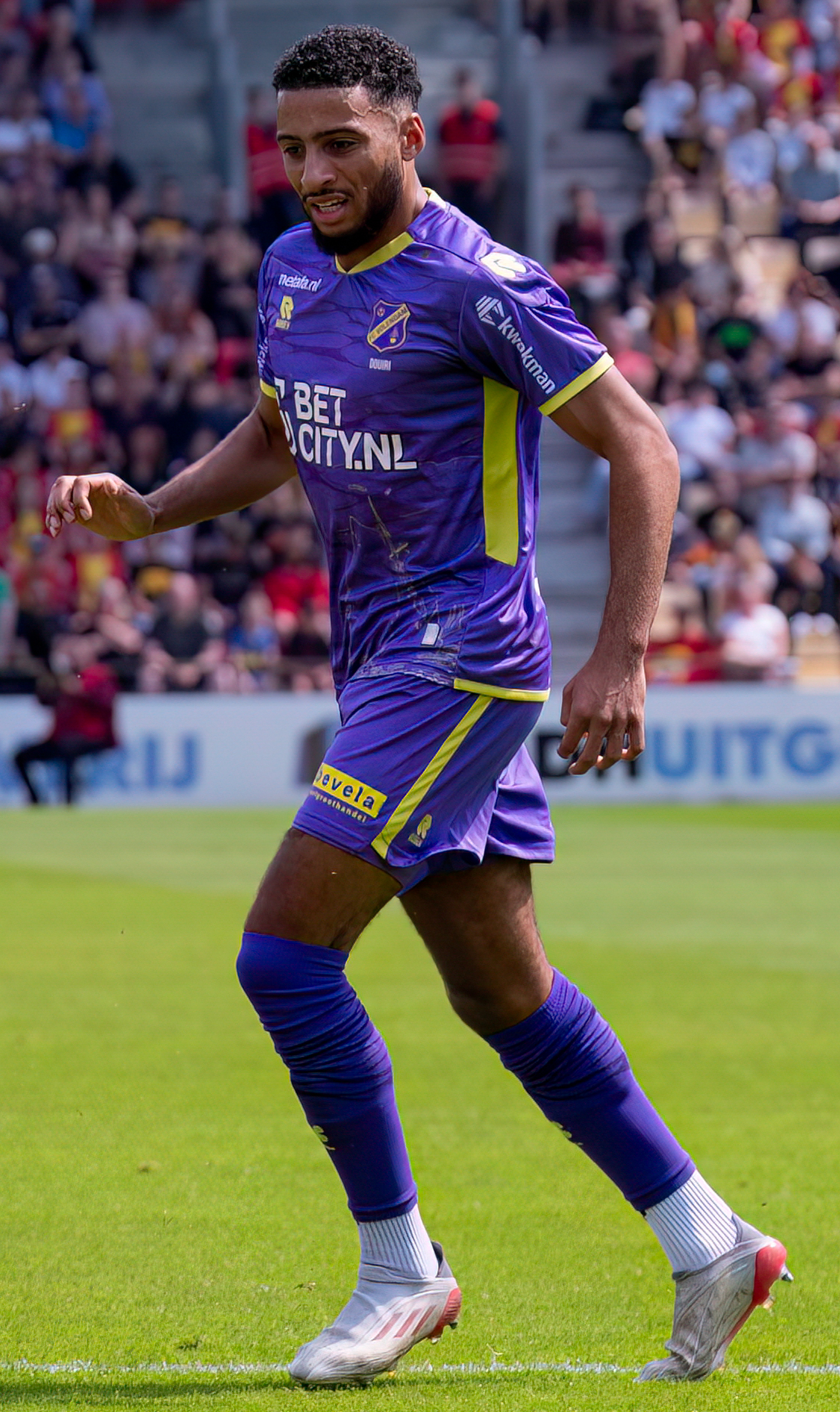
- Douiri with Volendam in 2023

Personal information
- Date of birth: 27 November 1999 (age 26)
- Place of birth: Amsterdam, Netherlands
- Positions: Right-back; left winger

Team information
- Current team: Al-Najma
- Number: 11

Youth career
- –2016: SC Buitenveldert
- 2016–2017: HFC EDO
- 2017–2018: ADO Den Haag
- 2019–2020: Zuidoost United
- 2020: IFK Eskilstuna

Senior career*
Years	Team	Apps	(Gls)
2020–2021	IJsselmeervogels	2	(0)
2021–2022	Jong Volendam	11	(3)
2021–2024	Volendam	31	(2)
2025	Telstar	3	(0)
2025–	Al-Najma	0	(0)
- * Club domestic league appearances and goals as of 11 May 2025

Achraf Douiri (born 27 November 1999) is a Dutch professional footballer who plays as a left winger or right-back for Bahraini Premier League club Al-Najma.

== Career ==
After playing for SC Buitenveldert and HFC EDO, Douiri entered the youth academy of ADO Den Haag in 2017. After one year he joined the Van Riemsdijk Sports Academy, hosted by fourth-tier Zuidoost United. With the academy he attended a tournament in Odense, Denmark, following which he signed with Swedish Second Division side IFK Eskilstuna in February 2020. Due to the coronavirus pandemic the Swedish league soon came to a halt. In the summer Douiri returned to the Netherlands and signed for IJsselmeervogels, where he soon made the move from the under-23 team to the first team squad. He made two appearances for the club, as amateur football in the Netherlands was soon shut down by the KNVB, because of the coronavirus crisis.

In 2021, Douiri signed a contract with FC Volendam until mid-2022. Initially playing as a winger, he was gradually converted into a right-back under head coach Wim Jonk. In mid-2022, he extended his contract until 2024. Douiri left Volendam upon the expiration of his contract in June 2024.

On 7 February 2025, after several months as a free agent, Douiri signed an amateur contract with Telstar of the Eerste Divisie. A backup during his brief spell, he made three appearances as Telstar won promotion to the Eredivisie for the first time in 47 years.

On 20 August 2025, Douiri joined Al-Najma in the Bahraini Premier League.
