= VV SHO =

Dutch football club

VV SHO, or in the long form Voetbalvereniging Steeds Hooger Oud-Beijerland, is a Dutch football club from Oud-Beijerland. It was established on 18 July 1930 and plays on Saturdays. The first squad competes in 2017-18 Eerste Klasse Saturday.

== History ==
Since 1992, VV SHO hovers between Hoofdklasse (12 seasons), Eerste klasse (10 seasons), and Tweede Klasse (4 seasons).

In 1996–97 it was the runner-up in the KNVB Amateur Cup, after losing in the finals to SV Babberich 2–0.

In the 2005–06 KNVB Cup, the Oud-Beijerland side passed Young PSV after the latter was disqualified for including an ineligible player. SHO then lost 11–1 to ADO Den Haag in The Hague.

In the 2013–14 KNVB Cup, the national soccer cup of the Netherlands, VV SHO lost at its Oud Beijerland grounds against Amsterdamsche FC, 1–2.

In 2015 Richard Middelkoop returned to coach the 1st squad. His contract was renewed in 2016.

== Staff ==
=== Head coach ===
- Jan de Gier (1994–1995)
- Harry van den Ham (1995–1997)
- Jaap Viergever (1999–2000)
- Jack van den Berg (2000–2001)
- Hans Maus (2001–2003)
- Jaap Viergever (2003)
- Joop Mourits (2003–2004)
- Richard Middelkoop (2004–2007)
- Daan van der Meer (2007–2008)
- Bill Tukker (2008–2010)
- Jeroen Rijsdijk (2010–2015)
- Richard Middelkoop (2015–2017)
- Sander Fakkel (2017–?)
- Gilbert de Wildt (2022–)

=== Honorary members ===
- Johan van Dam (2017)
