= Nils Rossen =

Dutch footballer (born 2004)

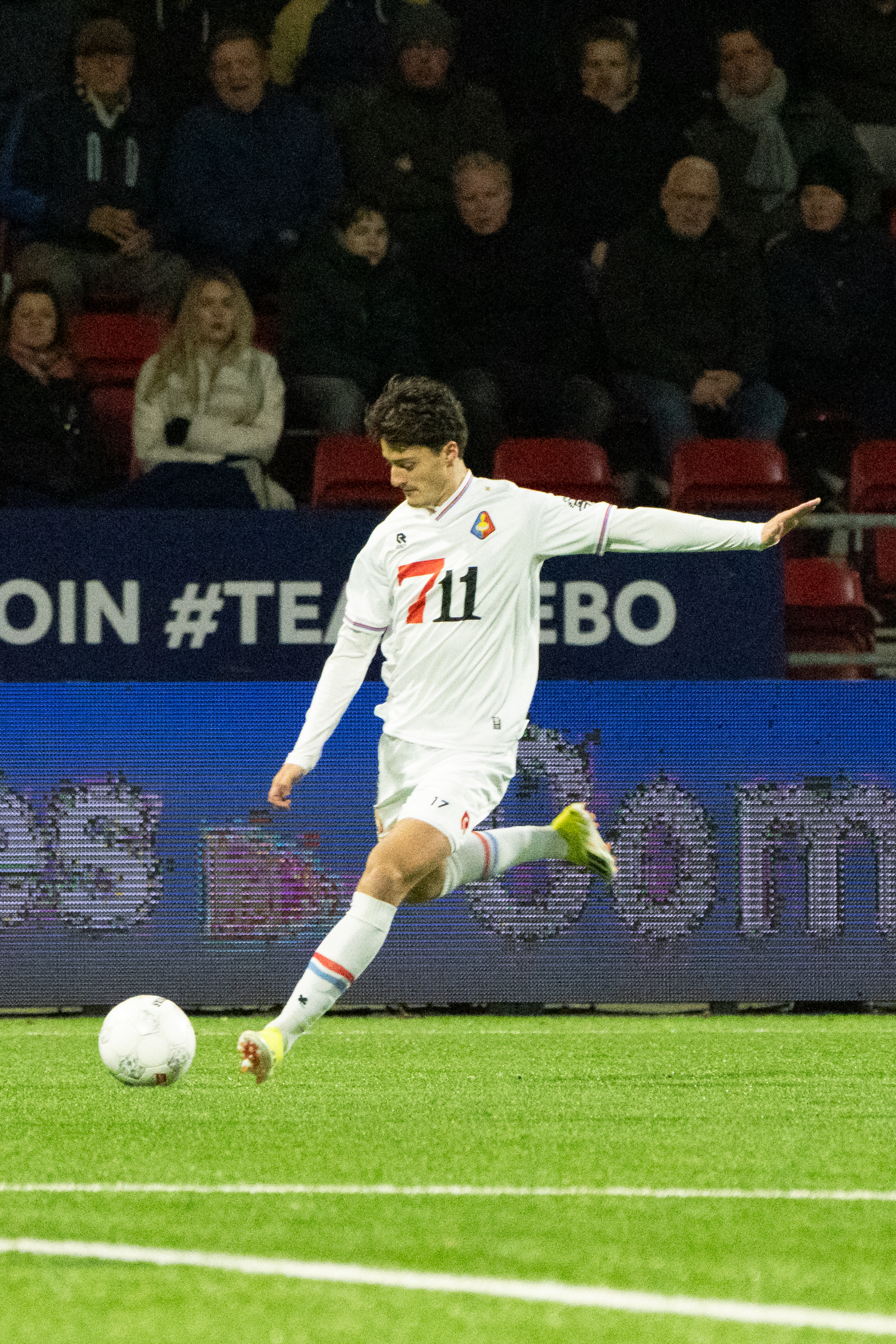
- Rossen with Telstar in 2024

Personal information
- Date of birth: 1 August 2004 (age 22)
- Place of birth: Wijchen, Netherlands
- Height: 1.81 m (5 ft 11 in)
- Position: Midfielder

Team information
- Current team: Telstar
- Number: 17

Youth career
- –2013: Alverna
- 2013–2021: NEC

Senior career*
Years	Team	Apps	(Gls)
2022–2024	NEC	3	(0)
2024–	Telstar	71	(3)
- * Club domestic league appearances and goals as of 12:40, 14 October 2026 (UTC)

Nils Rossen (born 1 August 2004) is a Dutch professional footballer who plays as a midfielder for Eredivisie club Telstar.

== Career ==
=== Early years ===
Rossen was born in Wijchen, Gelderland. As a child he played for local amateur club Alverna, and in 2013 – at age eight – he joined the Voetbal Academie NEC, the youth academy of NEC.

=== NEC ===
Developing at NEC, Rossen progressed through the youth teams to the under-21 squad. In December 2021, at age 17, he signed his first professional contract with the club, a deal running until 30 June 2024. He was occasionally involved with the first team and was invited to NEC's mid-season training camp in Spain in early 2022.

Rossen made his senior debut for NEC on 1 September 2023 in an Eredivisie away match against Sparta Rotterdam, coming on as a substitute in the 76th minute for Lars Olden Larsen. The match ended in a 1–1 draw. Over the 2023–24 season, he made a total of four first-team appearances for NEC – three in the Eredivisie and one in the KNVB Cup – totaling only 29 minutes of playing time. NEC had an option to extend his contract by one year but chose not to exercise it, as the club's technical director Carlos Aalbers felt Rossen's development had been inconsistent. His contract was not renewed and he left NEC as a free agent in July 2024.

=== Telstar ===
After leaving NEC, Rossen went on trial with second-tier Eerste Divisie club Telstar. He impressed during the trial period, and on 8 August 2024 he signed a contract with Telstar for two seasons with an option of a third year. Telstar's technical manager Peter Hofstede noted that Rossen had left a very good impression during his trial and expressed confidence that the midfielder could become an important player for the team.

Rossen made his Telstar debut as a starter the following day, on 9 August 2024, in the club's season opener away to Vitesse. He was in the starting lineup and played as Telstar achieved a 3–2 victory at the GelreDome in Arnhem. Later that year, on 31 October 2024, Rossen scored his first professional goal, finding the net in Telstar's 3–0 win over Helmond Sport in the first round of the KNVB Cup. By that point, he had also contributed three assists in league play during his initial months with Telstar. He featured in all of the club's subsequent play-off matches, including a 2–2 draw and 3–1 victory over Willem II in the final round, which secured Telstar's promotion to the Eredivisie for the first time in 47 years.

On 28 September 2025, he scored his first Eredivisie goal, finding the net in a 4–2 home win over Go Ahead Eagles.

== Style of play ==
Rossen is a left-footed midfielder. In his early senior career he was primarily used as a central or attacking midfielder. At Telstar, he was often deployed in an advanced midfield role just behind the strikers, where he has been noted for his vision and ability to find space in combination play. Club reports highlighted Rossen's composure in the penalty area and his knack for providing assists, underscoring his potential as a creative playmaker.

== Career statistics ==
As of match played 11 October 2026

Appearances and goals by club, season and competition
Club	Season	League			KNVB Cup		Other		Total	
Club	Season	Division	Apps	Goals	Apps	Goals	Apps	Goals	Apps	Goals
NEC	2023–24	Eredivisie	3	0	1	0	—		4	0
Telstar	2024–25	Eerste Divisie	35	0	2	1	6 (Note: Appearances in Eredivisie promotion/relegation playoffs)	0	43	1
Telstar	2025–26	Eredivisie	28	3	5	0	—		33	3
Telstar	2026–27	Eredivisie	8	0	0	0	—		8	0
Telstar	Total		71	3	7	1	6	0	84	4
Career total			84	3	8	1	6	0	88	4
