= Marvin Young (footballer) =

Dutch footballer (born 2005)

Personal information
- Date of birth: 2 October 2005 (age 21)
- Place of birth: Middelburg, Netherlands
- Height: 1.82 m (6 ft 0 in)
- Position: Centre-back

Team information
- Current team: Sparta Rotterdam
- Number: 3

Youth career
- 2014–2015: SV Jong Ambon
- 2015–2023: Sparta Rotterdam

Senior career*
Years	Team	Apps	(Gls)
2023–2024	Jong Sparta	24	(0)
2024–	Sparta Rotterdam	69	(2)

International career^{‡}
2023	Netherlands U18	2	(0)
2025–	Netherlands U21	2	(0)
- * Club domestic league appearances and goals as of 25 October 2026 ‡ National team caps and goals as of 14 November 2025

Marvin Young (born 2 October 2005) is a Dutch professional footballer who plays as a centre-back for the Eredivisie club Sparta Rotterdam.

== Club career ==
A youth product of SV Jong Ambon, Young joined the academy of Sparta Rotterdam at the age of nine, where he continued his development. He began featuring for the club's reserve side, Jong Sparta, in the Tweede Divisie in 2023.

On 22 June 2024, Young signed his first professional contract with Sparta, committing himself to the club until 2027. He made his senior and professional debut for Sparta on 31 August 2024, starting in a 2–1 Eredivisie victory over Willem II.

In January 2025, Young extended his contract with Sparta until 2029. In March 2025, he was named the Johan Cruyff Talent of the Month in the Eredivisie.

== International career ==
Young was born in the Netherlands to a Surinamese father and a Dutch mother. In 2023, he was called up to the Netherlands under-18 team for a series of friendly matches.

In September 2025, he received his first call-up to the Netherlands under-21 side. He made his debut on 14 October 2025, starting in a friendly match against the Lithuania under-21 team.

== Career statistics ==
=== Club ===
As of match played 28 October 2026

Appearances and goals by club, season and competition
Club	Season	League			Cup		Europe		Other		Total	
Club	Season	Division	Apps	Goals	Apps	Goals	Apps	Goals	Apps	Goals	Apps	Goals
Jong Sparta	2022–23	Tweede Divisie	2	0	—		—		—		2	0
Jong Sparta	2023–24	Tweede Divisie	20	0	—		—		—		20	0
Jong Sparta	2024–25	Tweede Divisie	2	0	—		—		—		2	0
Jong Sparta	Total		24	0	—		—		—		24	0
Sparta Rotterdam	2024–25	Eredivisie	26	0	2	0	—		0	0	28	0
Sparta Rotterdam	2025–26	Eredivisie	33	0	2	0	—		—		35	0
Sparta Rotterdam	2026–27	Eredivisie	10	2	1	0	—		—		11	2
Sparta Rotterdam	Total		69	2	5	0	—		0	0	74	2
Career total			93	2	5	0	0	0	0	0	98	2

== Honours ==
Individual

- Eredivisie Talent of the Month: March 2025
- Eredivisie Team of the Month: March 2025
