= Miguel Rodríguez (footballer, born April 2003) =

Spanish footballer

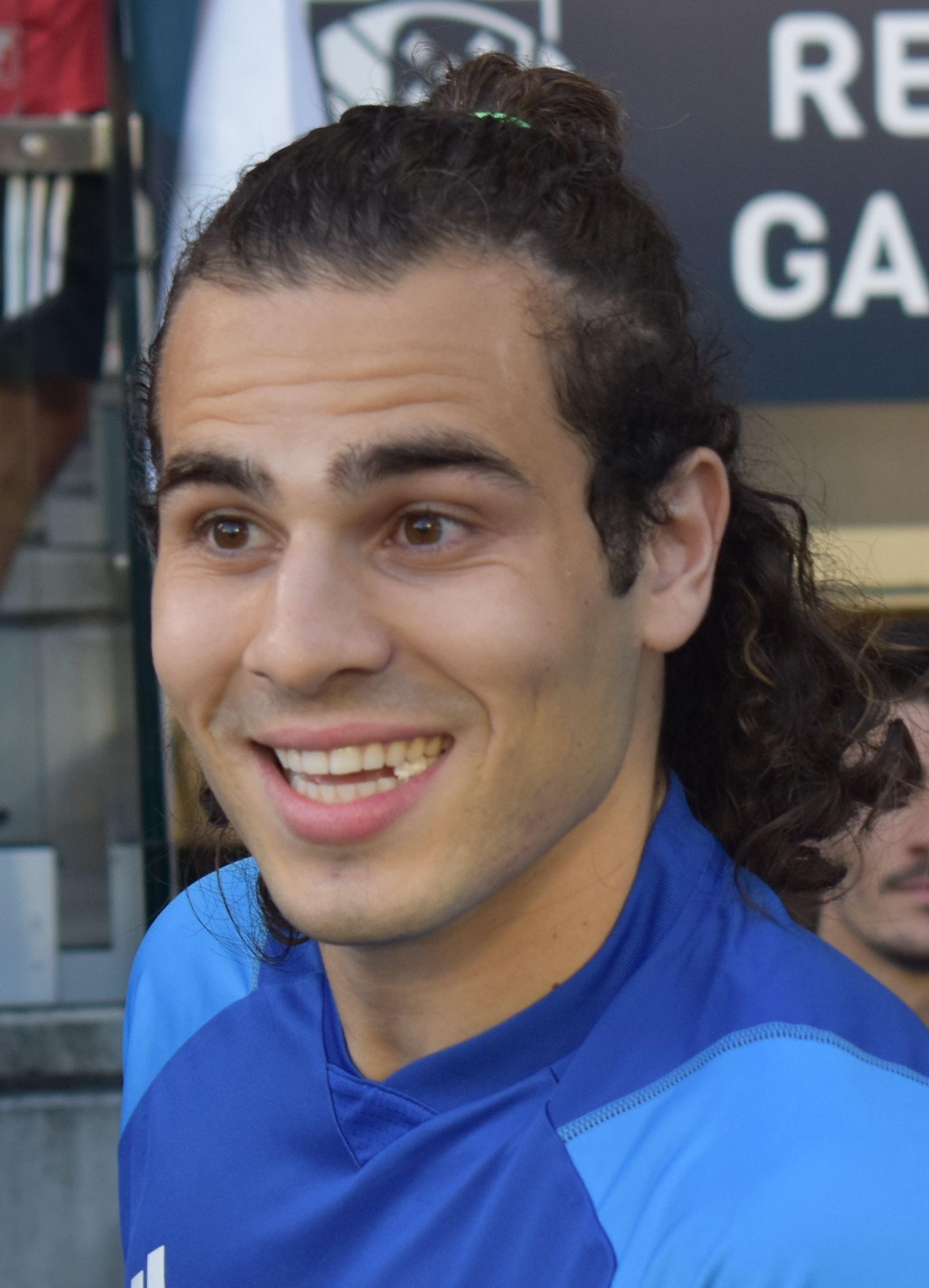
- Rodríguez with Galicia in 2024

Personal information
- Full name: Miguel Rodríguez Vidal
- Date of birth: 29 April 2003 (age 23)
- Place of birth: Redondela, Spain
- Height: 1.75 m (5 ft 9 in)
- Position: Winger

Team information
- Current team: Alavés

Youth career
- Choco
- 2013–2020: Celta

Senior career*
Years	Team	Apps	(Gls)
2020–2023	Celta B	70	(20)
2020–2025	Celta	26	(1)
2024–2025	→ Utrecht (loan)	22	(7)
2025–2026	Utrecht	24	(3)
2026–	Alavés	0	(0)

International career^{‡}
2018	Spain U15		
2019	Spain U16	8	(1)
2019	Spain U17	5	(0)
2019	Spain U18	3	(1)
2021	Spain U19	5	(3)
2024	Galicia	1	(0)
- * Club domestic league appearances and goals as of 6 March 2026 ‡ National team caps and goals as of 13 November 2021

Miguel Rodríguez Vidal (born 29 April 2003) is a Spanish footballer who plays mainly as a right winger for Deportivo Alavés.

== Club career ==
Born in Redondela, Pontevedra, Galicia, Rodríguez joined RC Celta de Vigo's youth setup in 2013, from CD Choco. In 2020, before even having appeared for the reserves, he was called up to make the pre-season with the main squad.

Rodríguez made his first team – and La Liga – debut on 4 October 2020, coming on as a late substitute for Nolito in a 0–2 away loss to CA Osasuna; aged 17 years and 159 days, he became the fourth-youngest to debut for the club, behind Sansón (the second-youngest of the league's history), Iago Bouzón and Santi Mina. He scored his first professional goal on 7 April 2023, netting his team's first in a 2–2 away draw against Sevilla FC.

On 5 July 2024, Rodríguez was loaned to Dutch Eredivisie side FC Utrecht for the 2024–25 season. On 15 April 2025, the purchase option in his loan contract was exercised. He will officially join the club in the summer.

On 27 July 2026, Rodríguez returned to Spain and its top tier, signing a five-year deal with Deportivo Alavés.

== Personal life ==
Rodríguez's younger brother Pedro is also a footballer. A central midfielder, he too represented Choco and Celta as a youth.

== Career statistics ==
=== Club ===
As of 6 March 2026

Appearances and goals by club, season and competition
Club	Season	League			Cup		Europe		Other		Total	
Club	Season	Division	Apps	Goals	Apps	Goals	Apps	Goals	Apps	Goals	Apps	Goals
Celta B	2020–21	Segunda División B	11	1	—		—		0	0	11	1
Celta B	2021–22	Primera División RFEF	32	11	—		—		—		32	11
Celta B	2022–23	Primera Federación	27	8	—		—		1 (Note: Appearance in 2023 Primera Federación play-offs)	0	28	8
Celta B	Total		70	20	0	0	—		1	0	71	20
Celta	2020–21	La Liga	4	0	0	0	—		—		4	0
Celta	2022–23	La Liga	7	1	1	0	—		—		8	1
Celta	2023–24	La Liga	15	0	5	1	—		0	0	20	1
Celta	Total		26	1	6	1	—		0	0	32	2
Utrecht (loan)	2024–25	Eredivisie	22	7	3	3	—		—		25	10
Utrecht (loan)	2025–26	Eredivisie	24	3	2	0	13 (Note: Appearances in UEFA Europa League)	2	—		39	5
Utrecht (loan)	Total		46	10	5	3	13	2	—		64	15
Career total			142	31	11	4	13	0	1	0	167	37

== Honours ==
Individual

- Eredivisie Player of the Month: April 2025
- Eredivisie Team of the Month: April 2025
