= Zuidoost United =

Dutch football club

Coordinates: 52°18′42.54″N 4°57′50.98″E

- Full name: Voetbalvereniging Zuidoost United
- Founded: 1 July 2010; 15 years ago
- Ground: Bijlmer Sportpark, Amsterdam-Zuidoost
- Chairman: Donovan Hooghart
- Manager: Guno Dollart
- League: Saturday Vijfde Klasse C (West 1) (2024–25)
- Website: zuidoostunited.nl
Home colours

Voetbalvereniging Zuidoost United is a football club based in the Zuidoost borough of Amsterdam, Netherlands. Founded in 2010, their main team competes in the Vijfde Klasse, the tenth and lowest tier of the Dutch football league system.

== History ==
In 2010 the club Zuidoost United was initiated on 1 July, out of a merger from preexisting SV Bijlmer, KSJB and Kismet '82, all amateur football clubs from the same area. The resulting combination had some 500 members as of June 2013, when it expelled some 200 members for not paying dues. The club has two teams, which compete in the Vierde Klasse, for both Saturday and Sunday league play. They also host an indoor Futsal team, as well as complete youth system.

== Stadium ==
Zuidoost United compete in the Bijlmer Sportpark, in the Bijlmer neighborhood of Amsterdam-Zuidoost.
