= Thomas Hardeman =

Thomas Hardeman may refer to:

- Thomas Hardeman Jr. (1825–1891), American politician, lawyer and soldier in Georgia
- Thomas Hardeman (Tennessee politician) (1750–1833), businessman and pioneer settler of Tennessee
