= Youssef El Kachati =

Footballer (born 1999)

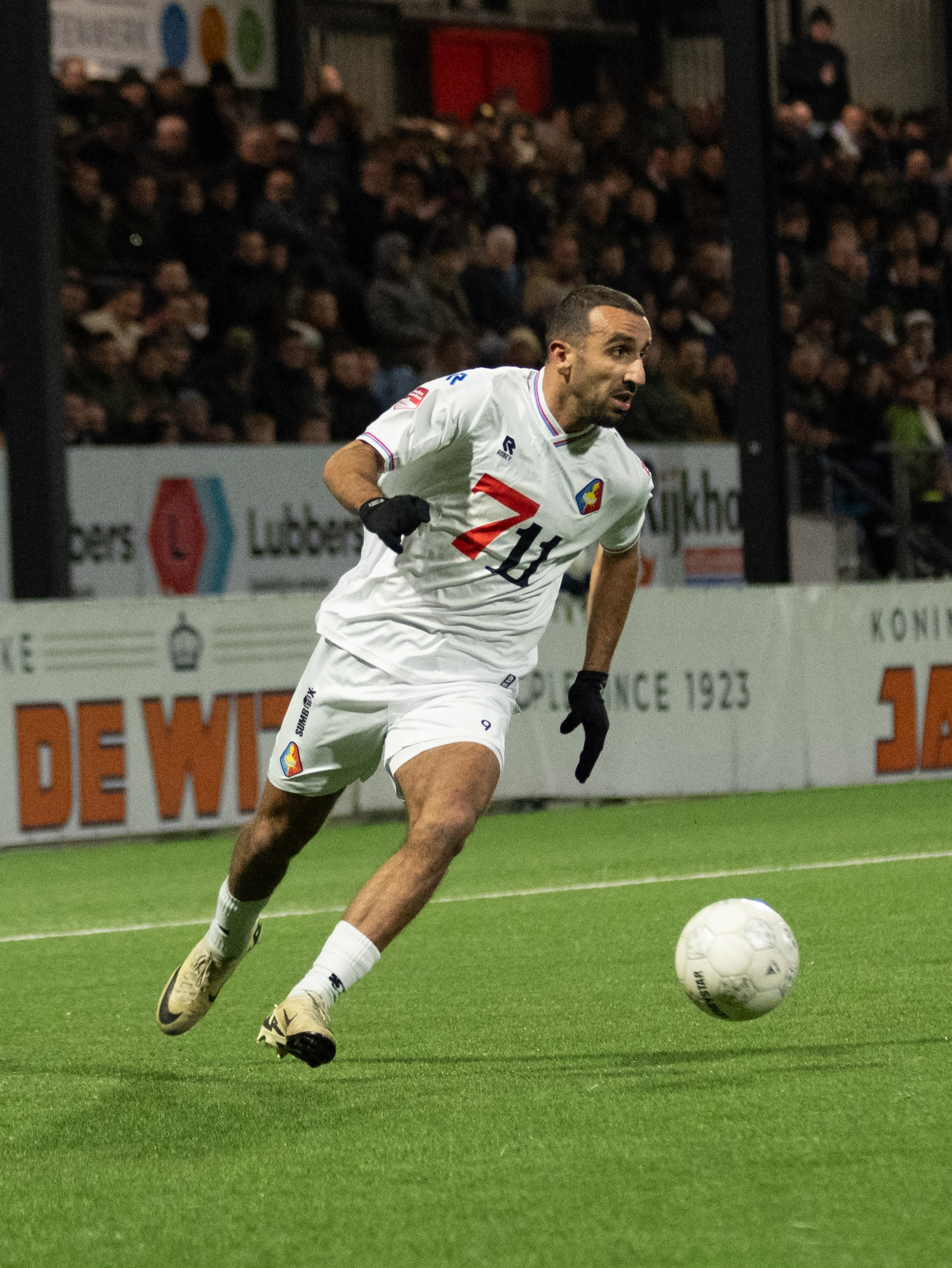
- El Kachati with Telstar in 2025

Personal information
- Date of birth: 9 November 1999 (age 27)
- Place of birth: Leiden, Netherlands
- Height: 1.85 m (6 ft 1 in)
- Positions: Forward; winger

Team information
- Current team: Reims
- Number: 10

Youth career
- –2016: Noordwijk
- 2016–2018: Sparta Rotterdam

Senior career*
Years	Team	Apps	(Gls)
2016–2020	Jong Sparta Rotterdam	34	(13)
2018–2020	Sparta Rotterdam	11	(0)
2020–2021	Noordwijk	1	(0)
2021	Westerlo	0	(0)
2022–2023	Quick Boys	52	(30)
2023–2025	Telstar	59	(25)
2025–2026	NEC	19	(3)
2026–	Reims	11	(2)

International career
2019	Morocco U23	1	(0)
- * Club domestic league appearances and goals as of 16:36, 11 November 2026 (UTC)

Youssef El Kachati (Arabic: يوسف الكشاطي, romanized: Yūsuf al-Kashāṭī; born 9 November 1999) is a professional footballer who plays as a forward or winger for Ligue 2 club Reims. Born in the Netherlands, he has represented Morocco internationally.

== Club career ==
=== Sparta Rotterdam ===
After originally joining Sparta Rotterdam's academy in 2016 from youth club Noordwijk, he signed a one-and-a-half-year professional contract with the club on 16 December 2018. He made his debut in Sparta's first team on 14 October 2018 in a 3–0 Eerste Divisie victory against Cambuur. He came on as a substitute for Ilias Alhaft in the 66th minute and received his first yellow card a minute later for diving.

=== Noordwijk ===
In 2020, El Kachati returned to Noordwijk to gain playing time in the Tweede Divisie. From in 2021, he moved to Belgium where he represented the under-21 team of Westerlo before joining Quick Boys in the Dutch Tweede Divisie in February 2022.

=== Quick Boys ===
In the 2022–23 season, El Kachati emerged as a prolific striker and was the top goalscorer of the Tweede Divisie halfway through the season. This sparked interest from clubs in both professional and amateur football. In December 2022, Quick Boys announced that El Kachati, his management, and the club had failed to reach an agreement on a contract extension.

In January 2023, it was announced that El Kachati would be joining IJsselmeervogels for the upcoming season. He signed a contract until mid-2024. However, it later became known that due to an agreement between IJsselmeervogels and Telstar, he would instead be playing for professional Eerste Divisie club Telstar from the 2023–24 season onwards.

=== Telstar ===
El Kachati made his debut for Telstar on 14 August 2023, starting in a 1–0 league loss on the opening day of the season to Jong PSV. On 2 February 2024, El Kachati scored his first goal for Telstar in a 6–1 loss to MVV. The following week, he scored a brace to help Telstar to a 3–2 victory over Helmond Sport. El Kachati scored six goals in 22 appearances in his debut season for the club.

In the 2024–25 Eerste Divisie season, El Kachati formed a forward partnership with Zakaria Eddahchouri, who led the division in scoring at the halfway point with 17 goals. At the end of January 2025, Eddahchouri moved to Deportivo La Coruña, leaving El Kachati to assume primary goalscoring duties. Having scored six goals up to that point, he subsequently embarked on a prolific run, netting 18 times in his final 21 appearances of the season. This included five goals in six matches during the Eredivisie promotion/relegation play-offs. El Kachati scored in both legs of the play-off final against Willem II, once in the 2–2 home draw and again in the 3–1 away victory, which secured promotion for Telstar and relegated Willem II. His contract with Telstar expired at the end of the campaign, making him a free agent. In total, he recorded 31 goals in 67 appearances for the club.

=== NEC ===
On 11 June 2025, El Kachati signed a three-year contract with Eredivisie club NEC, with a club option for an additional season. On 9 August, El Kachati made his debut for NEC in a 5–0 home win over Excelsior, coming on as a substitute for Kōki Ogawa. In his first involvement, he was fouled by goalkeeper Tijmen Holla to win a penalty, which Tjaronn Chery converted to complete the scoring. He netted his first goal for the club on 13 September, scoring the second in a 5–3 away defeat to PSV.

=== Reims ===
On 25 June 2026, El Kachati signed a two-year contract with Reims in French Ligue 2.

== International career ==
El Kachati debuted for the Morocco U23s in a 2–0 2019 Africa U-23 Cup of Nations qualification loss to the DR Congo U23s on 20 March 2019.

== Career statistics ==
As of match played 6 November 2026

Appearances and goals by club, season and competition
Club	Season	League			KNVB Cup		Other		Total	
Club	Season	Division	Apps	Goals	Apps	Goals	Apps	Goals	Apps	Goals
Jong Sparta Rotterdam	2017–18	Tweede Divisie	8	2	—		—		8	2
Jong Sparta Rotterdam	2018–19	Tweede Divisie	20	7	—		—		20	7
Jong Sparta Rotterdam	2019–20	Tweede Divisie	6	4	—		—		6	4
Jong Sparta Rotterdam	Total		34	13	—		—		34	13
Sparta Rotterdam	2018–19	Eerste Divisie	10	0	0	0	—		10	0
Sparta Rotterdam	2019–20	Eredivisie	1	0	0	0	—		2	0
Sparta Rotterdam	Total		11	0	0	0	—		11	0
Noordwijk	2020–21	Tweede Divisie	1	0	1	0	—		2	0
Quick Boys	2021–22	Tweede Divisie	18	6	0	0	—		18	6
Quick Boys	2022–23	Tweede Divisie	34	24	1	0	—		35	24
Quick Boys	Total		52	30	1	0	—		53	30
Telstar	2023–24	Eerste Divisie	22	6	0	0	—		22	6
Telstar	2024–25	Eerste Divisie	37	19	2	1	6 (Note: Appearances in Eredivisie promotion/relegation playoffs)	5	45	25
Telstar	Total		59	25	2	1	6	5	67	31
NEC	2025–26	Eredivisie	19	3	3	0	—		22	3
Reims	2026–27	Ligue 2	11	2	0	0	—		11	2
Career total			177	66	7	1	6	5	190	72
