= Anoush Dastgir =

Afghan football manager (born 1989)

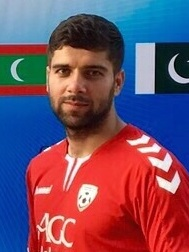
- Dastgir in 2022 with Afghanistan

Personal information
- Full name: Anoush Dastgir
- Date of birth: 27 November 1989 (age 36)
- Place of birth: Jabal Saraj, Afghanistan
- Height: 1.82 m (6 ft 0 in)
- Positions: Defender; midfielder

Team information
- Current team: Almere City (manager)

Youth career
- 2005–2008: NEC
- 2008–2010: VVV

Senior career*
Years	Team	Apps	(Gls)
2010–2012	NEC Amateurs		
2012–2013	Capelle		
2013–2015	NEC Amateurs		
2015	Lienden		
2015–2017	NEC Amateurs		

International career
2015–2016	Afghanistan	6	(0)

Managerial career
- 2012–2016: NEC U19
- 2016–2018: NEC Amateurs
- 2016: Afghanistan (interim)
- 2017–2018: Afghanistan (assistant)
- 2018: NEC Amateurs
- 2018–2022: Afghanistan
- 2018–2021: NEC Amateurs
- 2020–2022: DUNO
- 2022–2023: Almere City U21
- 2022–2025: Almere City (assistant)
- 2025–2026: Netherlands U18
- 2026–: Almere City
- * Club domestic league appearances and goals

Anoush Dastgir (born 27 November 1989) is an Afghan football manager and former player who is the head coach of Eerste Divisie club Almere City. Dastgir has also played for the Afghanistan national team.

== Early life ==
Dastgir, born in Afghanistan, grew up in Pakistan and India due to his father being a political refugee before settling in the Netherlands.

== Coaching career ==
=== Afghanistan ===
On 10 July 2018, Dastgir was announced by the Afghanistan Football Federation as the new head coach of the Afghanistan football team succeeding Otto Pfister.
