= Jeroen Rijsdijk =

Dutch footballer and manager

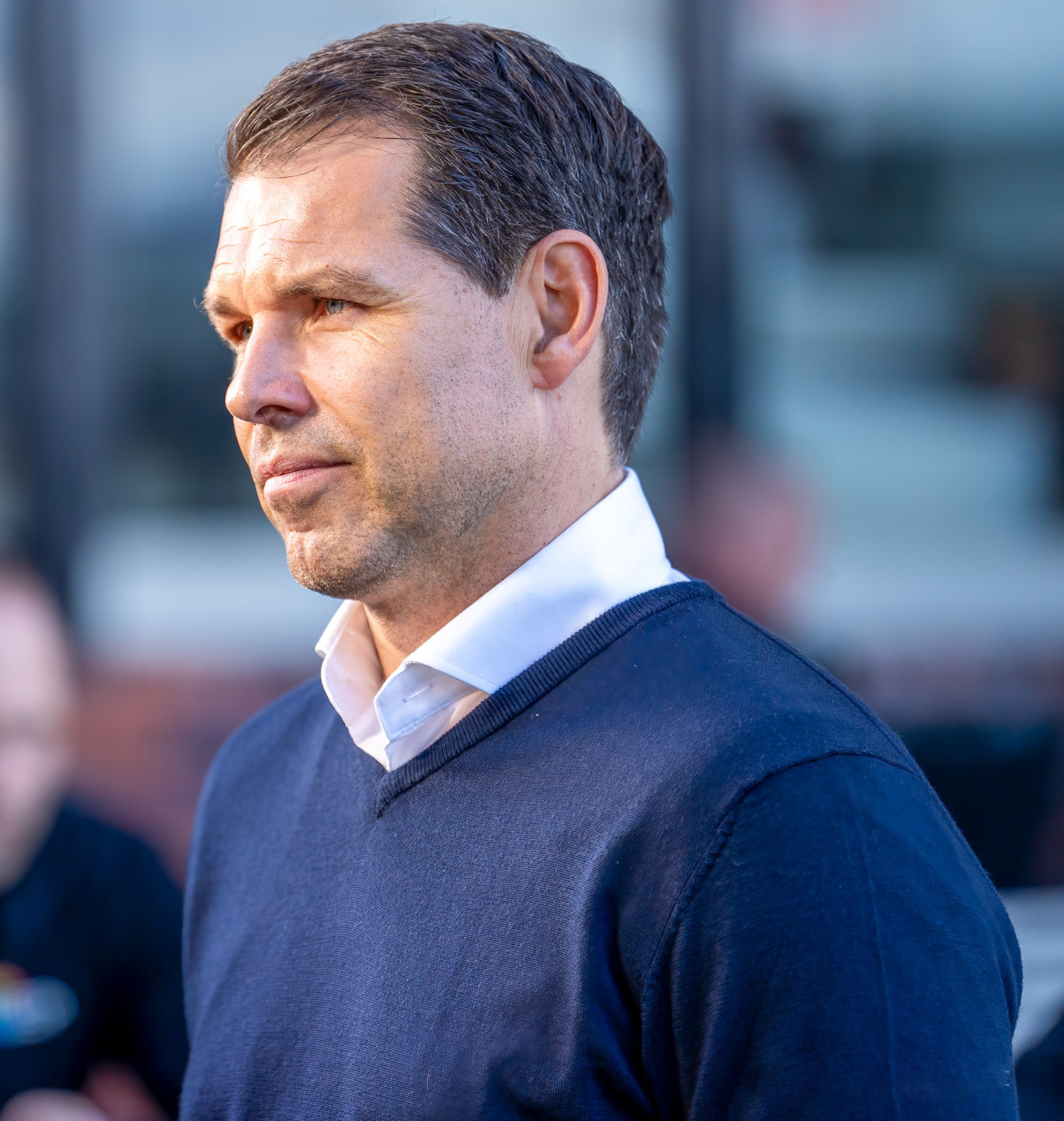
- Rijsdijk as Sparta Rotterdam head coach in 2023

Personal information
- Date of birth: 24 May 1977 (age 49)
- Place of birth: Rotterdam, Netherlands

Youth career
- Feyenoord
- VV SHO

Senior career*
Years	Team	Apps	(Gls)
2003–2007	IJsselmeervogels		
2007–2009	ASWH		

Managerial career
- 2010–2015: VV SHO
- 2015–2018: Excelsior
- 2018–2020: Jong Sparta
- 2021: Almere City (interim)
- 2021–2022: Sparta Rotterdam (youth)
- 2023–2024: Sparta Rotterdam
- 2025–2026: Almere City
- * Club domestic league appearances and goals

Jeroen Rijsdijk (born 24 May 1977) is a Dutch professional football coach and former player, who was most recently the head coach of Almere City.

== Playing career ==
Rijsdijk was a semi-professional footballer who trained with Feyenoord and VV SHO. From 2003 to 2007, he was with IJsselmeervogels where he became captain. He ended his career with ASWH, where he subsequently became assistant manager.

== Managerial career ==
Rijsdijk's managerial career formally began with his former club VV SHO, who he managed from 2010 to 2015. In 2015, he moved to Excelsior Maassluis, helping them win the 2015–16 Topklasse. In 2018, he moved to Jong Sparta in a role where he also was assistant to the head coach of the senior Sparta Rotterdam squad. In January 2020, he became the assistant manager to Ole Tobiasen at Almere City. In March 2021, he was named the interim manager after Tobiasen resigned. In June 2021, Gertjan Verbeek was appointed manager at Almere City, and Rijsdijk again became an assistant.

In August 2021, Rijsdijk returned to Sparta Rotterdam to help manage their youth academy. In April 2021, he was promoted to assistant manager under Maurice Steijn. After Steijn moved to Ajax, Rijsdijk was appointed senior manager with Sparta in the Eredivisie on 1 July 2023. After a disappointing start to the 2024/2025 season, Sparta announced in November 2024 that Rijsdijk was released as the club's manager. In January 2025, Risdijk returned to Almere City as head coach on a six-month contract until the end of the season.

== Managerial record ==
As of match played 16 May 2026

Team	From	To	Record				
Team	From	To	G	W	D	L	Win %
SHO	23 December 2010	30 June 2015	1	0	0	1	0.00
Excelsior	1 July 2015	30 June 2018	103	43	33	27	41.75
Jong Sparta	1 July 2018	20 January 2020	52	19	11	22	36.54
Almere City (caretaker)	4 March 2021	30 June 2021	13	6	4	3	46.15
Sparta Rotterdam	3 July 2023	1 November 2024	48	18	12	18	37.50
Almere City	3 January 2025	30 June 2026	63	25	12	26	39.68
Total			280	111	72	97	39.64

== Honours ==
Excelsior Derde Divisie: 2015–16
