= Almere City FC =

Association football club in the Netherlands

Coordinates: 52°23′40″N 5°14′26″E

- Full name: Almere City Football Club
- Nickname: De Zwarte Schapen (The Black Sheep)
- Founded: 14 September 2001; 25 years ago, as FC Omniworld
- Ground: Yanmar Hanasaka Stadion
- Capacity: 5,800
- Owner: Yanmar
- Chairman: John Bes
- Head coach: Anoush Dastgir
- League: Eerste Divisie
- 2025–26: Eerste Divisie, 5th of 20
- Website: almerecity.nl
Home colours	Away colours

Almere City Football Club is a professional football club based in Almere, Netherlands. While the current organization was founded in 2001, it has roots dating back to 1959. The club currently compete in the Eerste Divisie, following relegation from the Eredivisie in 2024–25. They play their home matches at the 5,800-capacity Yanmar Hanasaka Stadion.

The club builds on former clubs from Amsterdam and is a result of ambitions of the Almere city council to play an active role in top sports. To that end, the sports club Omniworld was formed, which consisted of a volleyball branch, a basketball branch and a football branch. Prior to the 2010–11 season, the club was renamed to Almere City FC.

== History ==
=== Early history ===
In 1954, in Amsterdam, the club BVC Amsterdam is founded. In 1959, after that club merged into DWS, disgruntled supporters founded their own club named De Zwarte Schapen, which translates to "The Black Sheep". Nineteen years later, in 1978, the club merges and is named Argonaut-Zwarte Schapen until 1988, when it is named FC Sloterpas for four years. It eventually reached the Hoofdklasse in 1995, when after several violent incidents on the pitch and a six-month suspension by the Royal Dutch Football Association (KNVB), the club moved from Amsterdam to nearby Almere. The club is immediately relegated before again achieving promotion. In 1997, it changed its name to Sporting Flevoland.

=== FC Omniworld ===
Club's logo from 2001 to 2010

That name was changed to FC Omniworld in 2000 as a result of the efforts of a consortium (in which the city of Almere was a participant) to bring professional sports to Almere. These plans included a basketball club (BC Omniworld, now defunct), a volleyball club (VC Omniworld, now defunct) and the football club (FC Omniworld). However, when the Leefbaar Almere party became the largest party in the city council in 2002, the city withdrew from the project. This caused the club to fail the criteria for admission to the professional league in 2004.

Private investors were found, and the club managed to meet the first two criteria for admission (among which is a balanced budget) in late 2004 and early 2005. After FC Omniworld's stadium (the 3,000 seater Yanmar Stadion) and pitch were approved by the KNVB as well, the club met all criteria for admission, and joined the 19 clubs already in the Eerste Divisie. The club's first official match would have been held on 12 August 2005 against BV Veendam. However, the referee postponed the match shortly before the kick-off because heavy rain had made the artificial turf pitch unplayable. The club's professional debut came a week later, in an away match against FC Eindhoven, a 2–0 defeat. FC Omniworld registered its first official goal a few days later, in a 2–3 home defeat against FC Den Bosch, as Juan Viedma Schenkhuizen scored to make the score 1–2 in the 37th minute. FC Omniworld's first league point was achieved a week later, on 29 August against Go Ahead Eagles (2–2). The club's first victory came on 16 September, when Fortuna Sittard were defeated 3–2. In its first season, FC Omniworld finished in 19th place with 29 points from 38 matches. Forward Sjoerd Ars ended in fifth place in the top goalscorer ranking, with 17 goals.

Ars transferred to Go Ahead Eagles for the 2006–07 season, but the results for FC Omniworld improved. The club achieved 41 points from 38 matches, finishing the season in 16th place. The 2–7 home match defeat against FC Zwolle on 16 March 2007 resulted in the then-worst defeat in the club's short history.

=== Almere City ===
==== Early struggles (2010–2016) ====
In March 2010, the club was renamed AFC Almere City before being changed again a few weeks later to Almere City FC, as the "AFC" prefix was deemed to be too reminiscent of the club's partners AFC Ajax. In their second match of the 2010–11 season, they were defeated 12–1 by Sparta Rotterdam, who equaled Ajax's Dutch league record win, with Johan Voskamp scoring a Jupiler League record eight goals on his debut.

Almere City FC finished dead last in the Eerste Divisie during their initial 2010–11 season, but were heeded from relegation due to the bankruptcy of RBC Roosendaal. In the following years, the team struggled to maintain consistency, and even suffered a relegation scare during the 2013–14 season.

==== Five-Year Plan and promotion (2016–present) ====
Under the guidance of manager Jack de Gier, the team underwent a revival, finishing in the top 10 for three consecutive seasons from 2016 to 2019. In 2016, This culminated in their then highest-ever league finish of 7th place in the 2018–19 season under head coach Ole Tobiasen. The same year, CEO John Bes, in consultation with the club's supervisory board, implemented a "five-year plan" which aimed to transform the club into a sustainable and professional football organisation, with an ultimate goal of reaching the Eredivisie.

In August 2019, the club announced plans of building a new grandstand and a club office building. The grandstand was completed during the 2020 winter break and increased the capacity of the stadium from around 3,000 to 4,501 spectators.

During the 2020–21 season, Almere City FC marked the conclusion of its prestigious five-year plan with a record-breaking season. The team achieved an impressive 75 points and scored a record-breaking 75 goals, securing a fourth-place finish in the final standings, which was considered a historic achievement for the club. However, the club's pursuit of promotion was unsuccessful as they were knocked out in the first round of the playoffs by NEC with a 4–0 defeat, during interim management under Jeroen Rijsdijk. During this period, the club's striker, Thomas Verheydt, set a new club record by becoming the first player in the club's history to score 20 goals in a single season, surpassing the previous record held by club legend Vincent Janssen. Despite the initial success, the club's good form was short-lived as they struggled in the 2021–22 season and could only manage a disappointing 14th-place finish.

During the 2022–23 season, head coach Alex Pastoor guided Almere City FC to a third-place finish, the highest in the club's history. In June 2023, they secured promotion to the Eredivisie for the first time by defeating FC Emmen 4–1 on aggregate in the promotion play-offs.

In their debut 2023–24 Eredivisie campaign, Almere City FC avoided relegation and retained their top-flight status. Ahead of the 2024–25 season, Pastoor departed and was replaced by Hedwiges Maduro. On 18 December 2024, with the club bottom of the table—eight points adrift after one win in 16 matches—Maduro was dismissed. He was succeeded in January 2025 by former interim manager Jeroen Rijsdijk, but the team failed to recover and finished last, resulting in relegation to the Eerste Divisie.

It was on 7 July 2025 that Yanmar agreed to buy Almere City and the rights of Yanmar Stadion. The takeover was finalised on 18 November 2025.

== Club name ==
- De Zwarte Schapen (1959-1978)
- Argonaut-Zwarte Schapen (1978-1988)
- FC Sloterpas (1988-1992)
- De Zwarte Schapen (1992-1997)
- Sporting Flevoland (1997-2000)
- FC Omniworld (2000–2010)
- AFC Almere City (2010)
- Almere City FC (2010–present)

== Current squad ==
As of 30 September 2026

Note: Flags indicate national team as defined under FIFA eligibility rules; some limited exceptions apply. Players may hold more than one non-FIFA nationality.

No.	Pos.	Nation	Player
1	GK	NED	Wessel Speel (on loan from Minnesota United)
2	DF	BEL	Martin Wasinski (on loan from Schalke 04)
3	DF	NED	Joey Jacobs
4	DF	WAL	James Lawrence (captain)
5	DF	NED	Teun Bijleveld
6	MF	NED	Enzo Cornelisse
7	FW	NED	Byron Burgering
8	MF	NED	Milan de Haan
9	FW	NED	Ferdy Druijf
10	FW	NED	Jamie Jacobs
11	FW	SUR	Marley Dors
12	GK	NED	Tristan Kuijsten
14	MF	NED	Mees Hoedemakers (on loan from Viborg FF)
15	DF	NED	Misha Engel
16	DF	NED	Tiziano Vianello

No.	Pos.	Nation	Player
17	FW	NED	Emmanuel Poku
18	FW	NED	Bas Huisman
19	MF	NED	Olivier de Nijs
20	MF	NED	Job Kalisvaart
21	MF	NED	Hamza el Dahri
22	DF	NED	Emmanuel van de Blaak
23	MF	NED	Jochem Ritmeester van de Kamp
24	GK	NED	Malcolm Mateyo
25	FW	NED	Immanuel Ghogli
26	DF	NED	Twan van der Zeeuw
30	GK	NED	Joël van der Wilt
33	DF	NED	Jereno van Gom
35	DF	NED	Bas Pennock
38	MF	NED	Lev Lenssen
44	DF	NED	Damian van Bruggen

== Club officials ==
Position	Staff
Chairman	(Netherlands) John Bes
Head Coach	(Afghanistan) Anoush Dastgir
Assistant Head Coach	(Netherlands) Dijar Kasim (Netherlands) Sander Keller
Goalkeeper Coach	(Netherlands) Dennis Smit
Fitness, Conditioning and Performance Coach	(Netherlands) Bas Buimer (Netherlands) Lucas Posthuma
Video Analyst	(Netherlands) Sem Schoolmeesters
Scout	(England) Jack Austin
Physiotherapist	(Netherlands) Joachim Hulscher (Netherlands) Ricardo de Sanders (Netherlands) Ruben den Hartog
Material	(Netherlands) Harry van Gent
Team Manager	(Netherlands) Isaac Teunis
