= 2026–27 FC Utrecht season =

FC Utrecht
2026–27 season
- Head coach: Anthony Correia
- Stadium: Stadion Galgenwaard
- VriendenLoterij Eredivisie: 14th
- Eurojackpot KNVB Beker: Second round
- Top goalscorer: League: Artem Stepanov (5); All: Artem Stepanov (5)
- Highest home attendance: 22,948 (vs. PSV, 30 August 2026, VriendenLoterij Eredivisie)
- Lowest home attendance: 21,903 (vs. Willem II, 11 October 2026, VriendenLoterij Eredivisie)
- Average home league attendance: 22,571
- Biggest win: 3–1 (vs. Willem II, 11 October 2026, Eredivisie)
- Biggest defeat: 0–5 (vs. Feyenoord, 20 September 2026, VriendenLoterij Eredivisie)
Home colours	Away colours	Third colours

The 2026–27 season is the 57th season in the existence of FC Utrecht and the club's 57th consecutive season in the top flight of Dutch football. In addition to the domestic league, FC Utrecht is participating in this season's edition of the Eurojackpot KNVB Beker.

== Players ==
=== First-team squad ===
As of 11 September 2026

Note: Flags indicate national team as defined under FIFA eligibility rules; some limited exceptions apply. Players may hold more than one non-FIFA nationality.

No.	Pos.	Nation	Player
1	GK	GRE	Vasilis Barkas
2	DF	BEL	Siebe Horemans
3	DF	BEL	Matisse Didden
5	DF	CYP	Nikolas Panayiotou
6	MF	NED	Guus Offerhaus
7	FW	DEN	Victor Jensen
8	MF	NED	Joris van Overeem (captain)
~~9~~	FW	NED	~~David Min~~ (Note: Left during the season.)
9	FW	UKR	Artem Stepanov (on loan from Bayer 04 Leverkusen)
10	FW	FRA	Yoann Cathline
11	FW	ESP	Ángel Alarcón
~~14~~	MF	IRQ	~~Zidane Iqbal~~
15	FW	ENG	Adrian Blake
17	FW	NED	Sem van Duijn (on loan from AZ)
18	DF	CRO	Jakov Medić (on loan from Norwich City FC)
20	MF	NED	Dani de Wit
21	DF	SUR	Neville Ogidi Nwankwo
22	GK	NED	Sergio Padt
23	MF	DEN	Niklas Vesterlund

No.	Pos.	Nation	Player
24	DF	GER	Jamie Schuldes
~~25~~	GK	NED	~~Michael Brouwer~~
26	FW	IDN	Miliano Jonathans
27	MF	BEL	Alonzo Engwanda
29	FW	NED	Noah Ohio
30	MF	USA	Kevin Paredes
31	GK	NED	Mees Eppink
32	DF	NED	Per Kloosterboer
33	GK	NED	Kevin Gadellaa
34	MF	NED	Davy van den Berg
35	DF	NED	Viggo Plantinga
38	MF	MAR	Oualid Agougil
39	MF	MAR	Nordin Amrabat
~~44~~	DF	NED	~~Mike Eerdhuijzen~~
47	FW	GER	Emmanuel Chigozie Owen
53	DF	GER	Ferdinand Pohl
80	FW	NOR	Marius Broholm (on loan from LOSC Lille)
92	MF	BFA	Arthur Zagré

== Transfers ==
=== Summer ===
==== Transfers in ====
Nat.	Pos.	Player	Transferred from	Particularities	Ref.
(Germany) GER	FW	Emmanuel Chigozie Owen	(Germany) Bayer 04 Leverkusen	Purchased	
(Netherlands) NED	MF	Guus Offerhaus	(Netherlands) Telstar	Purchased	
(Netherlands) NED	MF	Joris van Overeem	(Netherlands) sc Heerenveen	Purchased	
(Cyprus) CYP	DF	Nikolas Panayiotou	(Cyprus) Omonia Nicosia	Purchased	
(Spain) ESP	FW	Ángel Alarcón	(Portugal) FC Porto	Buy option lifted	
(Norway) NOR	FW	Marius Broholm	(France) LOSC Lille	On loan	
(Netherlands) NED	FW	Sem van Duijn	(Netherlands) AZ	On loan (+option to buy)	
(Croatia) CRO	DF	Jakov Medić	(England) Norwich City FC	On loan (+option to buy)	
(Ukraine) UKR	FW	Artem Stepanov	(Germany) Bayer 04 Leverkusen	On loan (+option to buy)	
(Morocco) MAR	MF	Nordin Amrabat	(Morocco) Wydad AC	Transfer free	
(Netherlands) NED	GK	Sergio Padt	(Bulgaria) PFC Ludogorets	Transfer free	
(United States) USA	MF	Kevin Paredes	(Germany) VfL Wolfsburg	Transfer free	
(Burkina Faso) BUR	MF	Arthur Zagré	(Netherlands) Excelsior Rotterdam	Transfer free	
(Morocco) MAR	MF	Oualid Agougil	(Netherlands) Jong FC Utrecht	Internal transfer	
(Netherlands) NED	GK	Mees Eppink	(Netherlands) Jong FC Utrecht	Internal transfer	
(Netherlands) NED	DF	Per Kloosterboer	(Netherlands) Jong FC Utrecht	Internal transfer	
(Netherlands) NED	MF	Davy van den Berg	(England) Luton Town FC	Back from loan (+option to buy)	
(Netherlands) NED	GK	Tom de Graaff	(Netherlands) PEC Zwolle	Back from loan (+option to buy)	
(Netherlands) NED	FW	Jesse van de Haar	(Belgium) SK Beveren	Back from loan (+option to buy)	
(Indonesia) IDN	FW	Miliano Jonathans	(Netherlands) Excelsior Rotterdam	Back from loan	
(Suriname) SUR	DF	Neville Ogidi Nwankwo	(Netherlands) Telstar	Back from loan	
(Netherlands) NED	FW	Noah Ohio	(Spain) Real Valladolid	Back from loan (+option to buy)	

==== Transfers out ====
Nat.	Pos.	Player	Transferred to	Particularities	Ref.
(Netherlands) NED	GK	Michael Brouwer	(Netherlands) Sparta Rotterdam	Sold	
(Netherlands) NED	DF	Mike Eerdhuijzen	(Belgium) KV Mechelen	Sold	
(Netherlands) NED	FW	Jesse van de Haar	(Netherlands) RKC Waalwijk	Sold	
(Iraq) IRQ	MF	Zidane Iqbal	(Scotland) Dundee United FC	Sold	
(Spain) ESP	FW	Miguel Rodríguez	(Spain) Deportivo Alavés	Sold	
(Netherlands) NED	GK	Tom de Graaff	(Netherlands) PEC Zwolle	Buy option lifted	
(England) ENG	MF	Emeka Adiele	(England) Burton Albion FC	On loan	
(Morocco) MAR	FW	Rafik El Arguioui	(Netherlands) SC Cambuur	On loan	
(Turkey) TUR	FW	Emirhan Demircan	(Netherlands) Telstar	On loan	
(Netherlands) NED	FW	David Min	(Germany) Arminia Bielefeld	On loan (+option to buy)	
(Germany) GER	MF	Can Bozdoğan	(Turkey) Çaykur Rizespor	Transfer free	
(Ivory Coast) CIV	FW	Sébastien Haller	(Japan) Sanfrecce Hiroshima	Transfer free	
(Netherlands) NED	DF	Mike van der Hoorn	(Cyprus) AEK Larnaca	Transfer free	
(Morocco) MAR	DF	Souffian El Karouani	(Saudi Arabia) Al-Qadisya	Transfer free	
(Netherlands) NED	DF	Nick Viergever	(Netherlands) PEC Zwolle	Transfer free	
(Netherlands) NED	MF	Jaygo van Ommeren	(Netherlands) Jong FC Utrecht	Internal transfer	
(Spain) ESP	FW	Ángel Alarcón	(Portugal) FC Porto	Back from loan (+option to buy)	
(Sweden) SWE	FW	Jesper Karlsson	(Italy) Bologna FC	Back from loan	
(Ukraine) UKR	FW	Artem Stepanov	(Germany) Bayer 04 Leverkusen	Back from loan (+option to buy)	
(Netherlands) NED	MF	Gjivai Zechiël	(Netherlands) Feyenoord	Back from loan	

== Pre-season and friendlies ==
Win Draw Loss Fixtures

27-06-2026 Friendly	FC Utrecht (Netherlands)	1–2	(Netherlands) De Graafschap	Utrecht, Netherlands
11:00 CEST (UTC+2)	Min 4'	Report	De Jong 3', 41'	Stadium: Sportpark Elinkwijk; Attendance: 1,700; Referee: Unknown

03-07-2026 Friendly	FC Utrecht (Netherlands)	2–1	(Netherlands) PEC Zwolle	Overvecht, Netherlands
Unknown	Stepanov 16'; Min 65' (pen.)	Report	Van der Wal 36'	Stadium: Conclusion Performance Centre; Attendance: 0 Referee: Clay Ruperti
Note: Closed-door friendly match.

07-07-2026 Friendly	FC Utrecht (Netherlands)	0–1	(Cyprus) Apollon Limassol	Haaksbergen, Netherlands
16:00 CEST (UTC+2)		Report	Shikkis 80'	Stadium: Sportpark de Greune; Attendance: 0 Referee: Unknown
Note: Closed-door friendly match.

11-07-2026 Friendly	FC Utrecht (Netherlands)	2–0	(Belgium) Beerschot	Overvecht, Netherlands
Unknown	Schuldes 76'; Alarcón 90'	Report		Stadium: Conclusion Performance Centre; Attendance: 0 Referee: Unknown
Note: Closed-door friendly match.

17-07-2026 Friendly	FC Utrecht (Netherlands)	3–2	(Japan) V-Varen Nagasaki	Utrecht, Netherlands
19:00 CEST (UTC+2)	Pohl 103'; El Arguioui 113'; Blake 129'	Report	T. Santana 59' (pen.); Yoneda 88'	Stadium: Sportpark Elinkwijk; Attendance: 1,111; Referee: Unknown
Note: The match completed a total of three times 45-minute.

24-07-2026 Friendly	FC Utrecht (Netherlands)	0–1	(Netherlands) SC Cambuur	Epe, Netherlands
12:00 CEST (UTC+2)		Report	Souren 7'	Stadium: Unknown; Attendance: Unknown; Referee: Unknown

24-07-2026 Friendly	FC Utrecht (Netherlands)	1–0	(Netherlands) SC Cambuur	Epe, Netherlands
Unknown	Stepanov 66'	Report		Stadium: Unknown; Attendance: Unknown; Referee: Unknown

29-07-2026 Friendly	FC Utrecht (Netherlands)	3–1	(Qatar) Al-Shahaniya SC	Overvecht, Netherlands
Unknown	Pohl 42'; Min 65', 86'	Report	El Jemili 51'	Stadium: Conclusion Performance Centre; Attendance: 0 Referee: Daniël Drost
Note: Closed-door friendly match.

02-08-2026 Friendly	FC Utrecht (Netherlands)	0–1	(Spain) Sevilla FC	Utrecht, Netherlands
14:30 CEST (UTC+2)	Vesterlund (yellow card); De Wit (yellow card)	Report	Peque 27'; Agoumé (yellow card)	Stadium: Stadion Galgenwaard; Attendance: 10,014; Referee: Martijn Vos

21-09-2026 Friendly	FC Utrecht (Netherlands)	0–4	(Netherlands) Almere City FC	Overvecht, Netherlands
Unknown		Report	Burgering 19'; Levant 55'; Dors 80'; Coghli 82'	Stadium: Conclusion Performance Centre; Attendance: 0 Referee: Alex Bos
Note: Closed-door friendly match.

02-10-2026 Friendly	Sparta Rotterdam (Netherlands)	2–2	(Netherlands) FC Utrecht	Rotterdam, Netherlands
Unknown	Zonneveld 27'; Ebite 67'	Report	De Wit 24'; Cathline 25'	Stadium: Sparta Stadion; Attendance: 0 Referee: Unknown
Note: Closed-door friendly match and the match completed a total of three times 30-minute.

12-10-2026 Friendly	ADO Den Haag (Netherlands)	3–2	(Netherlands) FC Utrecht	The Hague, Netherlands
Unknown	Bal 10'; Thomas 30'; Van Loenen 73'	Report	Van den Berg 58'; Menzo 70'	Stadium: WerkTalent Stadion; Attendance: 0 Referee: Dick Jol

11-11-2026 Friendly	Feyenoord (Netherlands)	3–2	(Netherlands) FC Utrecht	Rotterdam, Netherlands
Unknown	Borges 3'; Van Maarschalkerwaard 56'; Delianidis 61'	Report	Van den Berg 34'; De Wit 87'	Stadium: De Kuip; Attendance: 0 Referee: Unknown

== Competitions ==
=== Overall record ===
Competition	First match	Last match	Starting round	Record							
Competition	First match	Last match	Starting round	Pld	W	D	L	GF	GA	GD	Win %
VriendenLoterij Eredivisie	9 August 2026	23 May 2027	Matchday 1	12	3	3	6	21	34	−13	25.00
Eurojackpot KNVB Beker	29 October 2026		First round	1	1	0	0	1	0	+1	100.00
Total				13	4	3	6	22	34	−12	30.77

Last updated: 17 November 2026
Source: Soccerway

=== VriendenLoterij Eredivisie ===
==== League table ====
Pos	Team	Pld	W	D	L	GF	GA	GD	Pts	Qualification or relegation
12	Sparta Rotterdam	12	3	3	6	21	29	−8	12	
13	PEC Zwolle	12	3	3	6	13	24	−11	12	
14	Utrecht	12	3	3	6	21	34	−13	12	
15	Excelsior	12	3	2	7	16	29	−13	11	
16	Telstar	12	2	4	6	18	25	−7	10	Qualification for the Relegation play-off

Updated to match(es) played on 8 November 2026. Source: Eredivisie
Rules for classification: 1) Points; 2) Less loss points; 3) Goal difference; 4) Goals scored; 5) Head-to-head points; 6) Head-to-head goal difference; 7) Head-to-head away goals scored; 9) Play-off if relevant for deciding champion, relegation or participating in a European league, otherwise by draw. 9) Penalty shoot-out (only after a play-off)

==== Results summary ====
Overall								Home						Away					
Pld	W	D	L	GF	GA	GD	Pts	W	D	L	GF	GA	GD	W	D	L	GF	GA	GD
12	3	3	6	21	34	−13	12	1	2	3	11	18	−7	2	1	3	10	16	−6

Last updated: 17 November 2026.
Source: Eredivisie

==== Results by round ====
Round	1	2	3	4	5	6	7	8	9	10	11	12	13	14	15	16	17	18	19	20	21	22	23	24	25	26	27	28	29	30	31	32	33	34
Ground	A	H	A	H	H	A	A	H	A	H	A	H	-	-	-	-	-	-	-	-	-	-	-	-	-	-	-	-	-	-	-	-	-	-
Result	L	L	D	L	D	W	L	W	W	D	L	L	-	-	-	-	-	-	-	-	-	-	-	-	-	-	-	-	-	-	-	-	-	-
Position	12	14	15	16	15	14	15	13	11	11	12	14	-	-	-	-	-	-	-	-	-	-	-	-	-	-	-	-	-	-	-	-	-	-

Updated to match(es) played on 17 November 2026. Source: Eredivisie
A = Away; H = Home; W = Win; D = Draw; L = Loss

==== Matches ====
The league fixtures were announced on 16 June 2026.

9 August 2026 1	FC Groningen	2–1	FC Utrecht	Groningen
14:30 CEST (UTC+2)	Willumsson 8'; Van Bergen 48'	Report	Blake 80'; De Wit (yellow card) 84'; Van Overeem (yellow card) 88'	Stadium: Euroborg; Attendance: 22,525; Referee: Joey Kooij

15 August 2025 2	FC Utrecht	1–4	AZ	Utrecht
18:45 CEST (UTC+2)	Stepanov (yellow card) 23', (goal) 62'; Pohl (yellow card) 46'; Offerhaus (yellow card) 54'; Zagré (yellow card) 69'	Report	Koopmeiners 45+1'; Patati 47', (yellow card) 56'; Meerdink 49'; Echteld (yellow card) 69'; Oufkir 84'; Chávez (yellow card) 89'	Stadium: Stadion Galgenwaard; Attendance: 22,738; Referee: Danny Makkelie

22 August 2025 3	Sparta Rotterdam	3–3	FC Utrecht	Rotterdam
18:45 CEST (UTC+2)	Young 45'; Zonneveld 67'; Verschuren 90+6'	Report	Didden 16'; Stepanov 46'; Blake 76'	Stadium: Sparta Stadion; Attendance: 10,121; Referee: Dennis Higler

30 August 2025 4	FC Utrecht	1–6	PSV	Eindhoven
12:15 CEST (UTC+2)	Stepanov 6'; Offerhaus (yellow card) 15'; De Wit (yellow card) 34'; Zagré (yellow card) 49'; Barkas (yellow card) 85'; Horemans (yellow card) 90+2'	Report	Van Bommel 11'; Til 45', 88'; Obispo (yellow card) 72'; Mauro Júnior 76'; Mijnans (penalty missed) 86', 86'; Dest 90+3'	Stadium: Philips Stadion; Attendance: 22,948; Referee: Jeroen Manschot

8 September 2026 5	FC Utrecht	3–3	Go Ahead Eagles	Utrecht
14:00 CEST (UTC+2)	Van den Berg (yellow card) 44'; De Wit 63'; Stepanov (yellow card) 65', (goal) 90' (pen.); Didden 76'	Report	Suray 18'; Tengstedt 49'; Edvardsen 58'; Kramer (yellow card) 65'	Stadium: Stadion Galgenwaard; Attendance: 22.490 / 0 Referee: Martin van den Kerkhof
Note: The match on 5 September 2026 (the originally scheduled date) was definitively abandoned after 64 minutes due to misconduct. The remaining 26 minutes of play were completed on 8 September 2026 behind closed doors.

13 September 2026 6	Excelsior Rotterdam	1–2	FC Utrecht	Rotterdam
12:15 CEST (UTC+2)	Sulzbacher (yellow card) 71'; Sliti 77'; Domínguez (yellow card) 85'	Report	Stepanov 36'; De Wit 90+2'	Stadium: Stadion Woudestein; Attendance: 4,600; Referee: Sander van der Eijk

20 September 2026 7	Feyenoord	5–0	FC Utrecht	Rotterdam
12:15 CEST (UTC+2)	Hadj Moussa 6', 33'; Ferri 9'; Valente 53' (pen.); Diarra 64', (yellow card) 73'; López (yellow card) 70'	Report	Broholm (yellow card) 62'; Panayiotou (yellow card) 80'	Stadium: De Kuip; Attendance: 47,500; Referee: Joey Kooij

11 October 2026 8	FC Utrecht	3–1	Willem II	Utrecht
12:15 CEST (UTC+2)	Cathline (yellow card) 45', (goal) 53', 75'; Panayiotou (yellow card) 80'; Alarcón 90+2'	Report	Slory 60'	Stadium: Stadion Galgenwaard; Attendance: 21,903; Referee: Jannick van der Laan

18 October 2026 9	FC Twente	1–2	FC Utrecht	Enschede
20:00 CEST (UTC+2)	Weidmann 28'	Report	Alarcón 47', 63'; Horemans (yellow card) 57'; Van den Berg (yellow card) 70'	Stadium: De Grolsch Veste; Attendance: 28,500; Referee: Allard Lindhout

24 October 2026 10	FC Utrecht	1–1	PEC Zwolle	Utrecht
16:30 CEST (UTC+2)	Agougil (yellow card) 26'; Van Overeem (yellow card) 89'; Van Duijn 90+1'	Report	Sørensen 72'; Van der Wal (yellow card) 76'; Sommer (yellow card) 87'	Stadium: Stadion Galgenwaard; Attendance: 22,444; Referee: Martijn Vos

1 November 2026 11	Telstar	4–2	FC Utrecht	Velsen-Zuid
14:30 CET (UTC+1)	Owusu 8'; Soualhia 25'; Thórisson 44'; Martha 59'	Report	Alarcón 42'; Cathline 46'; De Wit (yellow card) 71'; Kloosterboer (yellow card) 73'	Stadium: BUKO Stadion; Attendance: 4,750; Referee: Richard Martens

8 November 2026 12	FC Utrecht	2–3	N.E.C.	Utrecht
20:00 CET (UTC+1)	Cathline 56', (yellow card) 90'; De Wit 64'; Amrabat (yellow card) 72'	Report	Kers 34'; Tadić 38', 58'; Linssen (yellow card) 85'; Bischoff (yellow card) 90'; Willumsson (yellow card) 90+3'	Stadium: Stadion Galgenwaard; Attendance: 22,902; Referee: Erwin Blank

21 November 2026 13	FC Utrecht	v	SC Cambuur	Utrecht
18:45 CET (UTC+1)				Stadium: Stadion Galgenwaard; Referee: Allard Lindhout

=== Eurojackpot KNVB Beker ===
29 October 2026 First round	Kozakken Boys	0–1	FC Utrecht	Werkendam
18:45 CET (UTC+1)		Report	Panayiotou 38'	Stadium: Sportpark de Zwaaier; Attendance: 5,000; Referee: Jeroen Manschot

3 December 2026 Second round	FC Emmen	v	FC Utrecht	Emmen
18:45 CET (UTC+1)				Stadium: De Oude Meerdijk

== Statistics ==
=== Goalscorers ===
Friendlies

Rank	Player	Goal
1.	(Netherlands) David Min	4
2.	(Netherlands) Davy van den Berg	2
2.	(Germany) Ferdinand Pohl	2
2.	(Ukraine) Artem Stepanov	2
2.	(Netherlands) Dani de Wit	2
6.	(Spain) Ángel Alarcón	1
6.	(Morocco) Rafik El Arguioui	1
6.	(England) Adrian Blake	1
6.	(France) Yoann Cathline	1
6.	(Netherlands) Björn Menzo	1
6.	(Germany) Jamie Schuldes	1
Own goals opponent		–
Totals		18

(Netherlands) VriendenLoterij Eredivisie

Rank	Player	Goal
1.	(Ukraine) Artem Stepanov	5
2.	(Spain) Ángel Alarcón	4
2.	(France) Yoann Cathline	4
4.	(Netherlands) Dani de Wit	3
5.	(England) Adrian Blake	2
5.	(Belgium) Matisse Didden	2
7.	(Netherlands) Sem van Duijn	1
Own goals opponent		–
Totals		21

(Netherlands) Eurojackpot KNVB Beker

Rank	Player	Goal
1.	(Cyprus) Nikolas Panayiotou	1
Own goals opponent		–
Totals		1

=== Assists ===
(Netherlands) VriendenLoterij Eredivisie

Rank	Player	
1.	(Netherlands) Davy van den Berg	2
1.	(France) Yoann Cathline	2
1.	(Denmark) Niklas Vesterlund	2
1.	(Burkina Faso) Arthur Zagré	2
5.	(Morocco) Oualid Agougil	1
5.	(Spain) Ángel Alarcón	1
5.	(Morocco) Nordin Amrabat	1
5.	(England) Adrian Blake	1
5.	(Norway) Marius Broholm	1
5.	(Netherlands) Joris van Overeem	1
5.	(Netherlands) Dani de Wit	1
Totals		15

(Netherlands) Eurojackpot KNVB Beker

Rank	Player	
1.	(Morocco) Oualid Agougil	–
Totals		1

== Monthly awards ==
Month	Type of award	Player	Ref.
August	Eredivisie Team of the Month	(Ukraine) Artem Stepanov	

== Attendance ==
=== Home games ===
Round	Opponent	Attendance	Total attendance	Average
VriendenLoterij Eredivisie
2	AZ	22,738	22,738	22,738
4	PSV	22,948	45,686	22,843
5	Go Ahead Eagles	22,490	68,176	22,725
8	Willem II	21,903	90,079	22,520
10	PEC Zwolle	22,444	112,523	22,505
12	N.E.C.	22,902	135,425	22,571
13	SC Cambuur	,	,	,
Eurojackpot KNVB Beker

=== Away supporters ===
Round	Opponent	Attendance	Total attendance	Average
VriendenLoterij Eredivisie
1	FC Groningen	1,100	1,100	1,100
3	Sparta Rotterdam	500	1,600	800
6	Excelsior Rotterdam	400	2,000	667
7	Feyenoord	1,200	3,200	800
9	FC Twente	0	3,200	640
11	Telstar	0	3,200	533
Eurojackpot KNVB Beker
First round	Kozakken Boys	500	500	500
Second round	FC Emmen	,	,	,
