= 2025–26 FC Utrecht season =

FC Utrecht
2025–26 season
- Head coach: Ron Jans
- Stadium: Stadion Galgenwaard
- Eredivisie: 6th
- KNVB Cup: Round of 16
- UEFA Europa League: League phase
- Play-offs: Runners-up
- Top goalscorer: League: Gjivai Zechiël (8); All: Victor Jensen (11)
- Highest home attendance: 23,121 (vs. PSV, 21 December 2025, Eredivisie)
- Lowest home attendance: 15,630 (vs. FC Twente, 13 January 2026, KNVB Cup)
- Average home league attendance: 22,167
- Biggest win: 4–0 (vs. Heracles Almelo, 10 August 2025, Eredivisie)
- Biggest defeat: 5–0 (vs. Excelsior Rotterdam, 26 April 2026, Eredivisie)
Home colours	Away colours	Third colours

The 2025–26 season was the 56th season in the existence of FC Utrecht and the club's 56th consecutive season in the top flight of Dutch football. In addition to the domestic league, FC Utrecht participated in this season's editions of the KNVB Cup and UEFA Europa League. After the regular season of the Eredivisie, the club qualified for the play-offs, which was played for a place in the second qualifying round of the UEFA Conference League.

== Players ==
=== First-team squad ===
As of 4 April 2026

Note: Flags indicate national team as defined under FIFA eligibility rules; some limited exceptions apply. Players may hold more than one non-FIFA nationality.

No.	Pos.	Nation	Player
1	GK	GRE	Vasilis Barkas
2	DF	BEL	Siebe Horemans
3	DF	NED	Mike van der Hoorn
~~5~~	DF	ISL	~~Kolbeinn Finnsson~~ (Note: Left during the season.)
5	DF	ENG	Emeka Adiele
~~6~~	MF	NED	~~Davy van den Berg~~
7	MF	DEN	Victor Jensen
8	MF	GER	Can Bozdoğan
9	FW	NED	David Min
10	FW	FRA	Yoann Cathline
~~11~~	FW	NED	~~Noah Ohio~~
11	FW	SWE	Jesper Karlsson (on loan from Bologna FC)
14	MF	IRQ	Zidane Iqbal
15	FW	ENG	Adrian Blake
16	DF	MAR	Souffian El Karouani
17	FW	TUR	Emirhan Demircan
18	FW	UKR	Artem Stepanov (on loan from Bayer 04 Leverkusen)
20	MF	NED	Dani de Wit
21	MF	NED	Gjivai Zechiël (on loan from Feyenoord)
22	FW	ESP	Miguel Rodríguez

No.	Pos.	Nation	Player
23	DF	DEN	Niklas Vesterlund
24	DF	NED	Nick Viergever (captain)
25	GK	NED	Michael Brouwer
~~26~~	FW	IDN	~~Miliano Jonathans~~
27	MF	BEL	Alonzo Engwanda
33	GK	NED	Kevin Gadellaa
38	MF	MAR	Oualid Agougil
40	DF	BEL	Matisse Didden
43	MF	MAR	Rafik El Arguioui
44	DF	NED	Mike Eerdhuijzen
46	MF	NED	Jaygo van Ommeren
49	FW	NED	Björn Menzo
50	DF	NED	Viggo Plantinga
51	GK	NED	Mees Eppink
52	GK	NED	Justin Eversen
53	DF	NED	Neal Viereck
~~55~~	DF	ENG	~~Derry John Murkin~~
57	DF	NED	Per Kloosterboer
77	FW	ESP	Ángel Alarcón (on loan from FC Porto)
91	FW	CIV	Sébastien Haller

== Transfers ==
=== Summer ===
==== Transfers in ====
Nat.	Pos.	Player	Transferred from	Particularities	Ref.
(Netherlands) NED	DF	Mike Eerdhuijzen	(Netherlands) Sparta Rotterdam	Purchased	
(England) ENG	DF	Derry John Murkin	(Germany) FC Schalke 04	Purchased	
(Netherlands) NED	DF	Neville Ogidi Nwankwo	(Netherlands) Quick Boys	Purchased	
(France) FRA	FW	Yoann Cathline	(France) FC Lorient	Buy option lifted	
(Spain) ESP	FW	Miguel Rodríguez	(Spain) Celta de Vigo	Buy option lifted	
(Netherlands) NED	MF	Gjivai Zechiël	(Netherlands) Feyenoord	On loan	
(Netherlands) NED	MF	Davy van den Berg	(Netherlands) PEC Zwolle	Transfer free	
(Turkey) TUR	FW	Emirhan Demircan	(Germany) FC Bayern München II	Transfer free	
(Ivory Coast) CIV	FW	Sébastien Haller	(Germany) Borussia Dortmund	Transfer free	
(Netherlands) NED	MF	Dani de Wit	(Germany) VfL Bochum	Transfer free	
(Morocco) MAR	MF	Rafik El Arguioui	(Netherlands) Jong FC Utrecht	Internal transfer	
(Netherlands) NED	FW	Jesse van de Haar	(Netherlands) Jong FC Utrecht	Internal transfer	
(Netherlands) NED	MF	Jaygo van Ommeren	(Netherlands) Jong FC Utrecht	Internal transfer	
(Netherlands) NED	GK	Mattijs Branderhorst	(Netherlands) Fortuna Sittard	Back from loan	

==== Transfers out ====
Nat.	Pos.	Player	Transferred to	Particularities	Ref.
(Netherlands) NED	GK	Mattijs Branderhorst	(Netherlands) Fortuna Sittard	Sold	
(Netherlands) NED	GK	Tom de Graaff	(Netherlands) PEC Zwolle	On loan (+option to buy)	
(Netherlands) NED	DF	Neville Ogidi Nwankwo	(Netherlands) Telstar	On loan	
(Netherlands) NED	MF	Jens Toornstra	(Netherlands) Sparta Rotterdam	Transfer free	
(Netherlands) NED	DF	Joshua Mukeh	(Netherlands) Jong FC Utrecht	Internal transfer	
(United States) USA	MF	Paxten Aaronson	(Germany) Eintracht Frankfurt	Back from loan	
(France) FRA	FW	Yoann Cathline	(France) FC Lorient	Back from loan (+option to buy)	
(Belgium) BEL	FW	Anthony Descotte	(Belgium) Royal Charleroi SC	Back from loan (+option to buy)	
(Denmark) DEN	MF	Oscar Fraulo	(Germany) Borussia Mönchengladbach	Back from loan (+option to buy)	
(Ivory Coast) CIV	FW	Sébastien Haller	(Germany) Borussia Dortmund	Back from loan	
(Spain) ESP	FW	Miguel Rodríguez	(Spain) Celta de Vigo	Back from loan (+option to buy)	

=== Winter ===
==== Transfers in ====
Nat.	Pos.	Player	Transferred from	Particularities	Ref.
(England) ENG	DF	Emeka Adiele	(England) West Ham United U21	Purchased	
(Spain) ESP	FW	Ángel Alarcón	(Portugal) FC Porto	On loan (+option to buy)	
(Sweden) SWE	FW	Jesper Karlsson	(Italy) Bologna FC	On loan	
(Ukraine) UKR	FW	Artem Stepanov	(Germany) Bayer 04 Leverkusen	On loan (+option to buy)	

==== Transfers out ====
Nat.	Pos.	Player	Transferred to	Particularities	Ref.
(England) ENG	DF	Derry John Murkin	(England) Derby County FC	Sold	
(Netherlands) NED	MF	Davy van den Berg	(England) Luton Town FC	On loan (+option to buy)	
(Iceland) ISL	DF	Kolbeinn Finnsson	(Norway) Vålerenga IF	On loan (buy option lifted)	
(Netherlands) NED	FW	Jesse van de Haar	(Belgium) SK Beveren	On loan (+option to buy)	
(Indonesia) IDN	FW	Miliano Jonathans	(Netherlands) Excelsior Rotterdam	On loan	
(Netherlands) NED	FW	Noah Ohio	(Spain) Real Valladolid	On loan (+option to buy)	

== Pre-season and friendlies ==
Win Draw Loss Fixtures

1 July 2025 Friendly	FC Utrecht (Netherlands)	1–3	(Romania) FCSB	Zeist, Netherlands
11:00 CEST (UTC+2)	Min 66'	Report	Cisotti 9'; Politic 76'; Perianu 77'	Stadium: KNVB Campus; Referee: Jannik van der Laan

5 July 2025 Friendly	FC Utrecht (Netherlands)	2–0	(Belgium) Cercle Brugge	Utrecht, Netherlands
14:30 CEST (UTC+2)	Cathline 47'; Van der Hoorn 73'	Report		Stadium: Sportpark Elinkwijk; Referee: Allard Lindhout (first part), Stan Teuben (part two)
Note: The match lasted a total of two halves of sixty minutes.

11 July 2025 Friendly	FC Utrecht (Netherlands)	4–0	(South Africa) Kaizer Chiefs	Garderen, Netherlands
16:00 CEST (UTC+2)	Horemans 6'; Blake 48', 55'; Jonathans 83'	Report		Stadium: Sportpark De Westeneng; Referee: Kevin Puts

18 July 2025 Friendly	FC Utrecht (Netherlands)	1–2	(Belgium) Royal Charleroi SC	Hattemerbroek, Netherlands
16:30 CEST (UTC+2)	Zechiël 42'	Report	Romsaas 63'; Guiagon 80'	Referee: Martin Pérez

19 July 2025 Friendly	RKC Waalwijk (Netherlands)	2–1	(Netherlands) FC Utrecht	Waalwijk, Netherlands
12:00 CEST (UTC+2)	Uneken 43'; Kramer 47' (pen.)	Report	Demircan 82'	Referee: Roel van der Werff

1 August 2025 Friendly	FC Utrecht (Netherlands)	2–0	(Netherlands) De Graafschap	Utrecht, Netherlands
	Blake 45'; Ohio 57'	Report		Stadium: Sportcomplex Zoudenbalch

3 September 2025 Friendly	FC Utrecht (Netherlands)	4–2	(Netherlands) Telstar	Overvecht, Netherlands
	Bozdoğan 11'; Ohio 27'; Jensen 61'; Van der Wegen 85'	Report	Zonneveld 39'; Tejan 65'	Stadium: FC Utrecht Topsportcentrum; Referee: Nurettin Eren

8 October 2025 Friendly	FC Utrecht (Netherlands)	0–3	(Netherlands) FC Groningen	Overvecht, Netherlands
		Report	Seuntjens 14'; Van der Werff 23'; Roeland 68'	Stadium: FC Utrecht Topsportcentrum

12 November 2025 Friendly	FC Utrecht (Netherlands)	2–1	(Netherlands) FC Groningen	Overvecht, Netherlands
	Cathline 61'; Bozdoğan 67'	Report	Oehlers 79'	Stadium: FC Utrecht Topsportcentrum; Referee: Nurettin Eren

26 March 2026 Friendly	FC Utrecht (Netherlands)	2–1	(Netherlands) FC Dordrecht	Overvecht, Netherlands
	Viereck 70'; Demircan 75'	Report	Van der Sluijs 73'	Stadium: FC Utrecht Topsportcentrum; Referee: Alex Bos

17 April 2026 Friendly	FC Utrecht (Netherlands)	5–1	(Netherlands) FC Volendam	Overvecht, Netherlands
	Cathline 13'; Haller 29'; Min 52'; Karlsson 66' (pen.); De Wit 75'	Report	Mühren 50' (pen.)	Stadium: FC Utrecht Topsportcentrum; Referee: Marc Nagtegaal

== Competitions ==
=== Overall record ===
Competition	First match	Last match	Starting round	Final position	Record							
Competition	First match	Last match	Starting round	Final position	Pld	W	D	L	GF	GA	GD	Win %
Eredivisie	10 August 2025	17 May 2026	Matchday 1	6th	34	15	8	11	55	42	+13	44.12
KNVB Cup	17 December 2025	13 January 2026	Second round	Round of 16	2	1	0	1	3	2	+1	50.00
UEFA Europa League (Note: Statistics based on both the qualifying phase and the league phase.)	24 July 2025	29 January 2026	Second qualifying round	League phase	14	5	2	7	19	19	+0	35.71
Play-offs	21 May 2026	24 May 2026	Semi-final	Runners-up	2	1	1	0	4	3	+1	50.00
Total					52	22	11	19	81	66	+15	42.31

Source: Soccerway

=== Eredivisie ===
==== League table ====
Pos	Team	Pld	W	D	L	GF	GA	GD	Pts	Qualification or relegation
4	Twente	34	15	13	6	59	40	+19	58	Qualification for the Europa League second qualifying round
5	Ajax (O)	34	14	14	6	62	41	+21	56	Qualification for the European competition play-offs
6	Utrecht	34	15	8	11	55	42	+13	53	Qualification for the European competition play-offs
7	AZ	34	14	10	10	58	51	+7	52	Qualification for the Europa League league phase (Note: Qualified for the Europa League league phase as the 2025–26 KNVB Cup winners.)
8	Heerenveen	34	14	9	11	57	53	+4	51	Qualification for the European competition play-offs

Source: Eredivisie
Rules for classification: At end of season: 1) Points; 2) Goal difference; 3) Goals scored; 4) Head-to-head points; 5) Head-to-head goal difference; 6) Head-to-head goals scored; 7) Head-to-head away goals scored; 8) Play-off match or matches; 9) Penalty shoot-out (if the play-off match or matches end in a draw)
(O) Play-off winners

==== Results summary ====
Overall								Home						Away					
Pld	W	D	L	GF	GA	GD	Pts	W	D	L	GF	GA	GD	W	D	L	GF	GA	GD
34	15	8	11	55	42	+13	53	10	3	4	31	13	+18	5	5	7	24	29	−5

Last updated: 18 May 2026.
Source: Eredivisie

==== Results by round ====
Round	1	2	3	4	5	6	7	8	9	10	11	12	13	14	15	16	17	18	19	20	21	22	23	24	25	26	27	28	29	30	31	32	33	34
Ground	H	A	H	A	H	A	H	A	H	A	H	H	A	A	H	A	H	A	A	H	A	H	A	H	H	A	A	H	A	H	A	H	A	H
Result	W	L	W	W	L	L	D	L	W	L	W	W	D	D	D	D	L	W	L	L	D	L	W	D	W	D	W	W	L	W	L	W	W	W
Position	3	7	6	3	6	8	7	9	8	9	6	5	5	6	7	8	8	7	9	10	10	10	10	8	8	9	8	7	9	7	8	8	7	6

Source: Eredivisie
A = Away; H = Home; W = Win; D = Draw; L = Loss

==== Matches ====
The league fixtures were announced on 24 June 2025.

10 August 2025 1	FC Utrecht	4–0	Heracles Almelo	Utrecht
16:45 CEST (UTC+2)	Zechiël 33'; Min (yellow card) 58', (goal) 62'; Jensen 70'; De Wit 79'	Report	Limbombe (yellow card) 46'; Hornkamp (yellow card) 66'	Stadium: Stadion Galgenwaard; Attendance: 21,875; Referee: Erwin Blank

17 August 2025 2	Sparta Rotterdam	2–1	FC Utrecht	Rotterdam
14:30 CEST (UTC+2)	Kitolano 25'; Lauritsen 88' (pen.), (yellow card) 90+5'	Report	De Wit (yellow card) 59', (goal) 63'; Engwanda (yellow card) 80'; El Karouani (yellow card) 90'	Stadium: Sparta Stadion Het Kasteel; Attendance: 10,040; Referee: Allard Lindhout

24 August 2025 3	FC Utrecht	4–1	Excelsior Rotterdam	Utrecht
14:30 CEST (UTC+2)	Rodríguez 27'; Min 45+1'; Jensen 58', 67'	Report	Yoon 83'	Stadium: Stadion Galgenwaard; Attendance: 21,547; Referee: Joey Kooij

31 August 2025 4	PEC Zwolle	0–2	FC Utrecht	Zwolle
14:30 CEST (UTC+2)	Pereira da Gama (yellow card) 89'; García MacNulty (yellow card) 90+9'	Report	Murkin (yellow card) 25', (goal) 44'; Van den Berg 41'	Stadium: MAC³PARK stadion Attendance: 13,789; Referee: Jannick van der Laan

14 September 2025 5	FC Utrecht	0–1	FC Groningen	Utrecht
14:30 CEST (UTC+2)		Report	Peersman (yellow card) 42'; Taha (yellow card) 55'; Rente 70'; Zawada (yellow card) 88'; Resink (yellow card) 90+2'	Stadium: Stadion Galgenwaard; Attendance: 22,681; Referee: Marc Nagtegaal

20 September 2025 6	Fortuna Sittard	1–0	FC Utrecht	Sittard
20:00 CEST (UTC+2)	Ihattaren 15'; Brittijn (yellow card) 24'; Limnios (yellow card) 39'; Michut (yellow card) 83'; Branderhorst (yellow card) 90+6'	Report	Iqbal (yellow card) 50'; Engwanda (yellow card) 54'	Stadium: Fortuna Sittard Stadion; Attendance: 10,623; Referee: Bas Nijhuis

28 September 2025 7	FC Utrecht	2–2	sc Heerenveen	Utrecht
14:30 CEST (UTC+2)	El Karouani 27'; Eerdhuijzen (yellow card) 42'; Rodríguez (yellow card) 81'; Min 89'	Report	Vente 39', 70'; Van Overeem (yellow card) 60'; Zagaritis (yellow card) 63'	Stadium: Stadion Galgenwaard; Attendance: 23,001; Referee: Alex Bos

5 October 2025 8	Feyenoord	3–2	FC Utrecht	Rotterdam
14:30 CEST (UTC+2)	Ueda 20', 88'; Read (yellow card) 23'; Steijn 50'; Van Persie (yellow card) 63'	Report	Zechiël 47'; Murkin 83'	Stadium: De Kuip; Attendance: 47,500; Referee: Jeroen Manschot

18 October 2025 9	FC Utrecht	3–1	FC Volendam	Utrecht
18:45 CEST (UTC+2)	Blake 53'; Zechiël (yellow card) 57'; El Karouani 75'; Rodríguez 90+2'	Report	Van Cruijsen 42'; Leliendal (yellow card) 65'	Stadium: Stadion Galgenwaard; Attendance: 22,303; Referee: Martin van den Kerkhof

26 October 2025 10	AZ	4–1	FC Utrecht	Alkmaar
16:45 CET (UTC+1)	Parrott 6', 34', (penalty missed) 60'; Mijnans 51'; De Wit 88'	Report	Blake (yellow card) 27'; Zechiël 69'	Stadium: AFAS Stadion; Attendance: 18,909; Referee: Bas Nijhuis

2 November 2025 11	FC Utrecht	1–0	N.E.C.	Utrecht
16:45 CET (UTC+1)	Rodríguez 41'; Blake (yellow card) 53'	Report	Linssen (yellow card) 42'; Sandler (yellow card) 74'; Chery (penalty missed) 87'	Stadium: Stadion Galgenwaard; Attendance: 23,049; Referee: Serdar Gözübüyük

9 November 2025 12	FC Utrecht	2–1	Ajax	Utrecht
12:15 CET (UTC+1)	Didden 45+1'; Haller 54'; Horemans (yellow card) 85'	Report	Godts 56'	Stadium: Stadion Galgenwaard; Attendance: 22,944; Referee: Danny Makkelie

23 November 2025 13	Telstar	1–1	FC Utrecht	Velsen-Zuid
14:30 CET (UTC+1)	Lechkar (yellow card) 2'; Hetli 56'; Offerhaus (yellow card) 70'	Report	Haller (yellow card) 64'; Engwanda (yellow card) 66'; Bozdoğan 90+3'	Stadium: BUKO Stadion; Attendance: 4,500; Referee: Robin Hensgens

30 November 2025 14	Go Ahead Eagles	2–2	FC Utrecht	Deventer
14:30 CET (UTC+1)	Deijl (yellow card) 63'; Suray 74'; Margaret 82'; Smit (yellow card) 84'	Report	Cathline 12', (yellow card) 44'; Zechiël 50'; Engwanda (yellow card) 78'	Stadium: De Adelaarshorst; Attendance: 9,943; Referee: Jannick van der Laan

7 December 2025 15	FC Utrecht	1–1	FC Twente	Utrecht
12:15 CET (UTC+1)	Jensen 52'; Viergever (yellow card) 90+3'	Report	D. Rots (yellow card) 24'; M. Rots 82'; Ørjasæter (yellow card) 90+5'	Stadium: Stadion Galgenwaard; Attendance: 23,045; Referee: Allard Lindhout

14 December 2025 16	NAC Breda	1–1	FC Utrecht	Breda
16:45 CET (UTC+1)	Odoi (yellow card) 4'; Paula 20'; Leemans (yellow card) 36'	Report	De Wit 26', (yellow card) 38'; Vesterlund (yellow card) 76'	Stadium: Rat Verlegh Stadion; Attendance: 20,108; Referee: Jeroen Manschot

21 December 2025 17	FC Utrecht	1–2	PSV	Utrecht
12:15 CET (UTC+1)	Viergever (yellow card) 26'; Van der Hoorn 31'; Jensen (yellow card) 68'; Cathline (yellow card) 90+7'	Report	Pepi 52'; Wanner (yellow card) 58'; Schouten (yellow card) 73' (yellow-red card) 88'; Perišić 76', (yellow card) 76'; Mauro Júnior (yellow card) 86'	Stadium: Stadion Galgenwaard; Attendance: 23,121; Referee: Bas Nijhuis

18 January 2026 19	FC Volendam	2–1	FC Utrecht	Volendam
14:30 CET (UTC+1)	Ideho 10'; Ugwu (yellow card) 23'; Kuwas 42'; Verschuren (yellow card) 83'; Van Cruijsen (yellow card) 90+4'	Report	Rodríguez (yellow card) 28'; Jensen 49'; Didden (yellow card) 83'; El Karouani (yellow card) 90+1'	Stadium: Kras Stadion; Attendance: 6,921; Referee: Marc Nagtegaal

25 January 2026 20	FC Utrecht	0–1	Sparta Rotterdam	Utrecht
16:45 CET (UTC+1)		Report	Mito 7'; Martins Indi (yellow card) 28'; Martes (yellow card) 47'; Young (yellow card) 62'	Stadium: Stadion Galgenwaard; Attendance: 22,543; Referee: Erwin Blank

1 February 2026 21	sc Heerenveen	1–1	FC Utrecht	Heerenveen
16:45 CET (UTC+1)	Trenskow 24'; Willemsen (yellow card) 47'	Report	Didden (yellow card) 52'; Karlsson 54'; Cathline (yellow card) 89'	Stadium: Abe Lenstra Stadion; Attendance: 22,555; Referee: Jannick van der Laan

8 February 2026 22	FC Utrecht	0–1	Feyenoord	Utrecht
12:15 CET (UTC+1)	Rodríguez (yellow card) 70' (yellow-red card) 78'; De Wit (yellow card) 90+3'	Report	Targhalline 10', (yellow card) 59'; Valente (yellow card) 28'; Hwang (yellow card) 63'; Wellenreuther (yellow card) 90'	Stadium: Stadion Galgenwaard; Attendance: 22,997; Referee: Martin van den Kerkhof

11 February 2026 18	N.E.C.	1–3	FC Utrecht	Nijmegen
21:00 CET (UTC+1)	Ouaissa (yellow card) 25'; Sandler (yellow card) 45'; Nejašmić 59'; Kaplan (yellow card) 89'	Report	Alarcón 5'; Didden (yellow card) 32'; Zechiël 45'; Cathline 49'; Karlsson (yellow card) 62'	Stadium: Goffertstadion; Attendance: 12,650; Referee: Danny Makkelie

14 February 2026 23	FC Groningen	1–2	FC Utrecht	Groningen
21:00 CET (UTC+1)	Taha 52'	Report	Zechiël (yellow card) 9'; De Wit 79'; Karlsson 90+1'	Stadium: Euroborg; Attendance: 21,976; Referee: Serdar Gözübüyük

22 February 2026 24	FC Utrecht	1–1	PEC Zwolle	Utrecht
14:30 CET (UTC+1)	Alarcón 12'; Agougil (yellow card) 65'	Report	Oosting 79'; Faberski (red card) 90+3'	Stadium: Stadion Galgenwaard; Attendance: 22,550; Referee: Robin Hensgens

1 March 2026 25	FC Utrecht	2–0	AZ	Utrecht
16:45 CET (UTC+1)	Cathline 9'; Stepanov 35' (pen.); Van der Hoorn (yellow card) 81'	Report	Oufkir (yellow card) 25'; Owusu-Oduro (yellow card) 33'; Smit (yellow card) 81'	Stadium: Stadion Galgenwaard; Attendance: 22,635; Referee: Rob Dieperink

6 March 2026 26	Heracles Almelo	0–0	FC Utrecht	Almelo
20:00 CET (UTC+1)	Van Hoorenbeeck (yellow card) 61'	Report	Viergever (yellow card) 90+5'	Stadium: Asito Stadion; Attendance: 11,832; Referee: Jannick van der Laan

15 March 2026 27	FC Twente	0–2	FC Utrecht	Enschede
12:15 CET (UTC+1)	Van den Belt (yellow card) 25'	Report	De Wit (yellow card) 18'; Stepanov 32'; Zechiël (yellow card) 57'; Alarcón 66'; Barkas (yellow card) 89'	Stadium: De Grolsch Veste; Attendance: 30,000; Referee: Marc Nagtegaal

22 March 2026 28	FC Utrecht	2–0	Go Ahead Eagles	Utrecht
14:30 CET (UTC+1)	Zechiël 16'; Stepanov 37'; De Wit (yellow card) 45+1'; Cathline (yellow card) 79'	Report	Baeten (yellow card) 75'	Stadium: Stadion Galgenwaard; Attendance: 22,938; Referee: Jeroen Manschot

4 April 2026 29	PSV	4–3	FC Utrecht	Eindhoven
16:30 CEST (UTC+2)	Saibari 21', 48'; Til 52'; Driouech 90+4'	Report	Stepanov 3'; Zechiël 13'; Vesterlund (yellow card) 71'; Karlsson 82'	Stadium: Philips Stadion; Attendance: 35,000; Referee: Serdar Gözübüyük

11 April 2026 30	FC Utrecht	4–1	Telstar	Utrecht
16:30 CEST (UTC+2)	Didden 10'; El Karouani (yellow card) 38'; Zechiël 61'; De Wit (yellow card) 67', (goal) 72'; Karlsson 90+1'	Report	Ogidi Nwankwo (yellow card) 48'; Bakker 58'	Stadium: Stadion Galgenwaard; Attendance: 23,011; Referee: Danny Makkelie

26 April 2026 31	Excelsior Rotterdam	5–0	FC Utrecht	Rotterdam
12:15 CEST (UTC+2)	Naujoks 11'; Sanches Fernandes 36', 55'; Yegoian 69'; Hartjes 90+3'	Report	Didden (yellow card) 29' (yellow-red card) 31'; Zechiël (yellow card) 64'	Stadium: Stadion Woudestein; Attendance: 4,600; Referee: Sander van der Eijk

2 May 2026 32	FC Utrecht	2–0	NAC Breda	Utrecht
16:30 CEST (UTC+2)	De Wit 86'; Blake 90+9'	Report	Nassoh (red card) 35'; Balard (yellow card) 40'; Bielica (yellow card) 82'	Stadium: Stadion Galgenwaard; Attendance: 23,034; Referee: Alex Bos

10 May 2026 33	Ajax	1–2	FC Utrecht	Amsterdam
16:45 CEST (UTC+2)	Berghuis (yellow card) 4'; Weghorst 84'; Steur (yellow card) 88'	Report	Karlsson (yellow card) 15'; De Wit (yellow card) 38'; Vesterlund 81'; Van der Hoorn 90+6'	Stadium: Johan Cruyff Arena; Attendance: 53,632; Referee: Jeroen Manschot

17 May 2026 34	FC Utrecht	2–0	Fortuna Sittard	Utrecht
14:30 CEST (UTC+2)	De Wit 39'; Min 65'	Report	Oukili (yellow card) 55'	Stadium: Stadion Galgenwaard; Attendance: 22,651; Referee: Ingmar Oostrom

=== KNVB Cup ===
17 December 2025 Second round	TOP Oss	0–2	FC Utrecht	Oss
20:00 CET (UTC+1)	Vianello (yellow card) 4'; Doucouré (yellow card) 24'	Report	Demircan 31'; El Karouani (yellow card) 80'; Jensen 84'; Didden (yellow card) 86'	Stadium: Frans Heesen Stadion; Attendance: 3,006; Referee: Marc Nagtegaal

13 January 2026 Round of 16	FC Utrecht	1–2	FC Twente	Utrecht
21:00 CET (UTC+1)	De Wit 12', (yellow card) 54'; El Karouani (yellow card) 31'; Haller (yellow card) 77'	Report	Lammers (yellow card) 52'; Zerrouki (yellow card) 55'; Van Wolfswinkel 68'; M. Rots 82'	Stadium: Stadion Galgenwaard; Attendance: 15,630; Referee: Serdar Gözübüyük

=== UEFA Europa League ===
==== Qualifying rounds ====
Second qualifying round

24 July 2025 1st leg	FC Sheriff Tiraspol (Moldova)	1–3	(Netherlands) FC Utrecht	Nisporeni, Moldova
19:00 CEST (UTC+2)	Ademo 24'; Bessala (yellow card) 69'; Soumah (yellow card) 70'; Loukou (yellow card) 88'	Report	Jensen 33', (yellow card) 62'; Viergever 54'; Blake 70'	Stadium: Centrul Tineret si Sport Nisporeni; Attendance: 2,674; Referee: Philip Farrugia (Malta)

31 July 2025 2nd leg	FC Utrecht (Netherlands)	4–1	(Moldova) FC Sheriff Tiraspol	Utrecht, Netherlands
20:00 CEST (UTC+2)	Jensen 27'; Horemans 46'; Viergever 56'; El Karouani 89'	Report	Odede 75'	Stadium: Stadion Galgenwaard; Attendance: 21,611; Referee: Chrysovalantis Theouli (Cyprus)

Third qualifying round

7 August 2025 1st leg	Servette FC (Switzerland)	1–3	(Netherlands) FC Utrecht	Geneva, Switzerland
20:30 CEST (UTC+2)	Guillemenot 12'; Srdanović (yellow card) 27'; Frick (yellow card) 90+2'; Bronn (yellow card) 90+5'	Report	Viergever (yellow card) 10'; Baron 52' (o.g.); Horemans 55'; Zechiël 62', (yellow card) 80'	Stadium: Stade de Genève; Attendance: 11,744; Referee: Harm Osmers (Germany)

14 August 2025 2nd leg	FC Utrecht (Netherlands)	2–1	(Switzerland) Servette FC	Utrecht, Netherlands
20:00 CEST (UTC+2)	Zechiël (yellow card) 38'; Engwanda (yellow card) 48'; Blake (yellow card) 53'; Jensen 57', 74'; Van der Hoorn (yellow card) 69'	Report	Fomba (yellow card) 29'; Antunes (yellow card) 31'; Gourvennec (yellow card) 37'; Stevanović (yellow card) 39'; Bronn (yellow card) 51'; Jallow 80' (pen.)	Stadium: Stadion Galgenwaard; Attendance: 21,497; Referee: Chris Kavanagh (England)

Play-off round

21 August 2025 1st leg	HŠK Zrinjski Mostar (Bosnia and Herzegovina)	0–2	(Netherlands) FC Utrecht	Mostar, Bosnia and Herzegovina
20:00 CEST (UTC+2)	Abramović (yellow card) 41'; Jakovljević (yellow card) 56'; Mamić (yellow card) 69' (yellow-red card) 90+4'; Vranjković (yellow card) 77'	Report	Vesterlund (yellow card) 19'; Min 39' (pen.); El Karouani (yellow card) 75'; Jensen 85'; Van der Hoorn (yellow card) 87'	Stadium: Stadion pod Bijelim Brijegom; Attendance: 4,400; Referee: Georgi Kabakov (Bulgaria)

28 August 2025 2nd leg	FC Utrecht (Netherlands)	0–0	(Bosnia and Herzegovina) HŠK Zrinjski Mostar	Utrecht, Netherlands
20:00 CEST (UTC+2)	Blake (yellow card) 54'; El Karouani (yellow card) 67'	Report	Šakota (yellow card) 9'; Đurasek (yellow card) 47'; Savić (yellow card) 90+5'	Stadium: Stadion Galgenwaard; Attendance: 21,594; Referee: Benoît Bastien (France)

==== League phase ====
The league phase draw was held on 29 August 2025.

Pos	Team	Pld	W	D	L	GF	GA	GD	Pts
32	(Scottish Football Association) Rangers	8	1	1	6	5	14	−9	4
33	(French Football Federation) Nice	8	1	0	7	7	15	−8	3
34	(Royal Dutch Football Association) Utrecht	8	0	1	7	5	15	−10	1
35	(Swedish Football Association) Malmö FF	8	0	1	7	4	15	−11	1
36	(Israel Football Association) Maccabi Tel Aviv	8	0	1	7	2	22	−20	1

Source: UEFA
Rules for classification: League phase tiebreakers

==== Results summary ====
Overall								Home						Away					
Pld	W	D	L	GF	GA	GD	Pts	W	D	L	GF	GA	GD	W	D	L	GF	GA	GD
8	0	1	7	5	15	−10	1	0	1	3	2	6	−4	0	0	4	3	9	−6

Source: Soccerway

==== Results by round ====
Round	1	2	3	4	5	6	7	8
Ground	H	A	A	H	A	H	H	A
Result	L	L	L	D	L	L	L	L
Position	28	33	35	32	32	32	34	34

Source: Soccerway
A = Away; H = Home; W = Win; D = Draw; L = Loss

==== Matches ====
25 September 2025 1	FC Utrecht (Netherlands)	0–1	(France) Olympique Lyonnais	Utrecht, Netherlands
21:00 CEST (UTC+2)	Jans (yellow card) 31'; Engwanda (yellow card) 84'; El Karouani (yellow card) 90+5'	Report	Fonseca (yellow card) 31'; Šulc (yellow card) 57'; Mata (yellow card) 67'; Tessmann 75', (yellow card) 75'; Maitland-Niles (yellow card) 80'	Stadium: Stadion Galgenwaard; Attendance: 22,083; Referee: Horațiu Feșnic (Romania)

2 October 2025 2	SK Brann (Norway)	1–0	(Netherlands) FC Utrecht	Bergen, Norway
18:45 CEST (UTC+2)	Magnússon 41'; Knudsen (yellow card) 81'; Dyngeland (yellow card) 88'	Report	Zechiël (yellow card) 88'; Bozdoğan (yellow card) 90+1'	Stadium: Brann Stadion; Attendance: 15,366; Referee: Aliyar Aghayev (Azerbaijan)

23 October 2025 3	SC Freiburg (Germany)	2–0	(Netherlands) FC Utrecht	Freiburg, Germany
21:00 CEST (UTC+2)	Suzuki 20'; Grifo 45'	Report	Murkin (yellow card) 88'	Stadium: Europa-Park Stadion; Attendance: 34,195; Referee: Rohit Saggi (Norway)

6 November 2025 4	FC Utrecht (Netherlands)	1–1	(Portugal) FC Porto	Utrecht, Netherlands
18:45 CET (UTC+1)	Rodríguez 48'; Zechiël (yellow card) 62'; Barkas (red card) 66'; Van den Berg (yellow card) 79'; Horemans (yellow card) 90+1'	Report	Pepê (yellow card) 24'; Prpić (yellow card) 26'; Fernandes (yellow card) 57'; Sainz 66'; Froholdt (yellow card) 70'; Costa (yellow card) 90+6'	Stadium: Stadion Galgenwaard; Attendance: 23,053; Referee: John Beaton (Scotland)

27 November 2025 5	Real Betis (Spain)	2–1	(Netherlands) FC Utrecht	Seville, Spain
21:00 CET (UTC+1)	Hernández 42'; Ezzalzouli 50'; Rodriguez (yellow card) 86'	Report	Rodríguez 55'; Engwanda (yellow card) 67'	Stadium: Estadio La Cartuja; Attendance: 46,170; Referee: Nenad Minaković (Serbia)

11 December 2025 6	FC Utrecht (Netherlands)	1–2	(England) Nottingham Forest FC	Utrecht, Netherlands
18:45 CET (UTC+1)	Rodríguez (yellow card) 47'; Van der Hoorn 73'; Zechiël (yellow card) 90'	Report	Kalimuendo 52'; Anderson (yellow card) 65'; Igor Jesus 88', (yellow card) 89'	Stadium: Stadion Galgenwaard; Attendance: 22,865; Referee: Irfan Peljto (Bosnia and Herzegovina)

22 January 2026 7	FC Utrecht (Netherlands)	0–2	(Belgium) KRC Genk	Utrecht, Netherlands
21:00 CET (UTC+1)		Report	El Ouahdi 54', (yellow card) 62'; Heymans 83' (pen.)	Stadium: Stadion Galgenwaard; Attendance: 22,761; Referee: Rob Hennessy (Ireland)

29 January 2026 8	Celtic FC (Scotland)	4–2	(Netherlands) FC Utrecht	Glasgow, Scotland
21:00 CET (UTC+1)	Nygren 6'; Viergever 10' (o.g.); Engels 19' (pen.), (yellow card) 39'; Yang (yellow card) 33'; Trusty 66'	Report	De Wit 44'; Blake 62'; El Karouani (yellow card) 65'	Stadium: Celtic Park; Attendance: 55,559; Referee: Mohammad Al-Emara (Finland)

=== Play-offs ===
21 May 2026 Semi-final	FC Utrecht	3–2	sc Heerenveen	Utrecht
21:00 CEST (UTC+2)	Stepanov 46'; Van der Hoorn 56'; El Karouani 58'	Report	Linday (yellow card) 49'; Vente 54'; Trenskow 77'	Stadium: Stadion Galgenwaard; Attendance: 19,334; Referee: Jannick van der Laan

24 May 2026 Final	Ajax	1–1 (a.e.t.) (4–3 p)	FC Utrecht	Volendam
12:15 CEST (UTC+2)	Klaassen 96', (yellow card) 120'; Weghorst (yellow card) 107'	Report	El Arguioui (yellow card) 90+5'; Zechiël 106'	Stadium: Kras Stadion; Attendance: 5,300; Referee: Allard Lindhout
	Penalties
	Klaassen (penalty scored); Weghorst (penalty scored); Godts (penalty scored); Gaaei (penalty scored)		(penalty missed) Haller; (penalty scored) El Arguioui; (penalty scored) Zechiël; (penalty scored) Blake; (penalty missed) El Karouani

== Statistics ==
=== Goalscorers ===
Friendlies

Rank	Player	Goal
1.	(England) Adrian Blake	3
1.	(France) Yoann Cathline	3
3.	(Germany) Can Bozdoğan	2
3.	(Turkey) Emirhan Demircan	2
3.	(Netherlands) David Min	2
3.	(Netherlands) Noah Ohio	2
7.	(Ivory Coast) Sébastien Haller	1
7.	(Netherlands) Mike van der Hoorn	1
7.	(Belgium) Siebe Horemans	1
7.	(Denmark) Markus Jensen	1
7.	(Indonesia) Miliano Jonathans	1
7.	(Sweden) Jesper Karlsson	1
7.	(Netherlands) Neal Viereck	1
7.	(Netherlands) Sil van der Wegen	1
7.	(Netherlands) Gjivai Zechiël	1
7.	(Netherlands) Dani de Wit	1
Own goals opponent		-
Totals		24

(Netherlands) Eredivisie

Rank	Player	Goal
1.	(Netherlands) Gjivai Zechiël	8
2.	(Netherlands) Dani de Wit	7
3.	(Denmark) Victor Jensen	5
4.	(Sweden) Jesper Karlsson	4
4.	(Netherlands) David Min	4
4.	(Ukraine) Artem Stepanov	4
7.	(Spain) Ángel Alarcón	3
7.	(France) Yoann Cathline	3
7.	(Spain) Miguel Rodríguez	3
10.	(England) Adrian Blake	2
10.	(Belgium) Matisse Didden	2
10.	(Netherlands) Mike van der Hoorn	2
10.	(Morocco) Souffian El Karouani	2
10.	(England) Derry John Murkin	2
15.	(Netherlands) Davy van den Berg	1
15.	(Germany) Can Bozdoğan	1
15.	(Ivory Coast) Sébastien Haller	1
15.	(Denmark) Niklas Vesterlund	1
Own goals opponent		-
Totals		55

(Netherlands) KNVB Cup

Rank	Player	Goal
1.	(Turkey) Emirhan Demircan	1
1.	(Denmark) Victor Jensen	1
1.	(Netherlands) Dani de Wit	1
Own goals opponent		-
Totals		3

(Europe) UEFA Europa League (Note: Statistics based on both the qualifying phase and the league phase.)

Rank	Player	Goal
1.	(Denmark) Victor Jensen	5
2.	(England) Adrian Blake	2
2.	(Belgium) Siebe Horemans	2
2.	(Spain) Miguel Rodríguez	2
2.	(Netherlands) Nick Viergever	2
6.	(Netherlands) Mike van der Hoorn	1
6.	(Morocco) Souffian El Karouani	1
6.	(Netherlands) David Min	1
6.	(Netherlands) Dani de Wit	1
6.	(Netherlands) Gjivai Zechiël	1
Own goals opponent		1
Totals		19

(Netherlands) Play-offs

Rank	Player	Goal
1.	(Netherlands) Mike van der Hoorn	1
1.	(Morocco) Souffian El Karouani	1
1.	(Ukraine) Artem Stepanov	1
1.	(Netherlands) Gjivai Zechiël	1
Own goals opponent		–
Totals		4

=== Assists ===
(Netherlands) Eredivisie

Rank	Player	
1.	(Morocco) Souffian El Karouani	11
2.	(Netherlands) Gjivai Zechiël	7
3.	(France) Yoann Cathline	4
4.	(Spain) Ángel Alarcón	3
4.	(Ivory Coast) Sébastien Haller	3
4.	(England) Derry John Murkin	3
4.	(Netherlands) Dani de Wit	3
8.	(England) Adrian Blake	2
9.	(Belgium) Alonzo Engwanda	1
9.	(Belgium) Siebe Horemans	1
9.	(Indonesia) Miliano Jonathans	1
9.	(Sweden) Jesper Karlsson	1
9.	(Netherlands) David Min	1
9.	(Ukraine) Artem Stepanov	1
9.	(Denmark) Niklas Vesterlund	1
Totals		43

(Netherlands) KNVB Cup

Rank	Player	
1.	(Belgium) Siebe Horemans	1
Totals		1

(Europe) UEFA Europa League

Rank	Player	
1.	(Morocco) Souffian El Karouani	6
2.	(Netherlands) Gjivai Zechiël	3
3.	(Belgium) Siebe Horemans	2
4.	(Belgium) Alonzo Engwanda	1
4.	(England) Derry John Murkin	1
4.	(Denmark) Niklas Vesterlund	1
Totals		14

(Netherlands) Play-offs

Rank	Player	
1.	(Morocco) Souffian El Karouani	1
1.	(Denmark) Niklas Vesterlund	1
Totals		2

== Monthly awards ==
Month	Type of award	Player	Ref.
October	Johan Cruyff Talent of the Month	(Netherlands) Gjivai Zechiël	
October	Team of the Month	(Netherlands) Gjivai Zechiël	
May	Johan Cruyff Talent of the Month	(Netherlands) Gjivai Zechiël	
May	Rinus Michels Manager of the Month	(Netherlands) Ron Jans	

== Attendance ==
=== Home games ===
Round	Opponent	Attendance	Total attendance	Average
Eredivisie
1	Heracles Almelo	21,875	21,875	21,875
3	Excelsior Rotterdam	21,547	43,422	21,711
5	FC Groningen	22,681	66,103	22,034
7	sc Heerenveen	23,001	89,104	22,276
9	FC Volendam	22,303	111,407	22,281
11	N.E.C.	23,049	134,456	22,409
12	Ajax	22,944	157,400	22,486
15	FC Twente	23,045	180,445	22,556
17	PSV	23,121	203,566	22,618
20	Sparta Rotterdam	22,543	226,109	22,611
22	Feyenoord	22,997	249,106	22,646
24	PEC Zwolle	22,550	271,656	22,638
25	AZ	22,635	294,291	22,638
28	Go Ahead Eagles	22,938	317,229	22,659
30	Telstar	23,011	340,240	22,683
32	NAC Breda	23,034	363,274	22,705
34	Fortuna Sittard	22,651	385,925	22,701
KNVB Cup
Round of 16	FC Twente	15,630	15,630	15,630
UEFA Europa League
Second qualifying round	(Moldova) FC Sheriff Tiraspol	21,611	21,611	21,611
Third qualifying round	(Switzerland) Servette FC	21,497	43,108	21,554
Play-off round	(Bosnia and Herzegovina) HŠK Zrinjski Mostar	21,594	64,702	21,567
League phase	(France) Olympique Lyonnais	22,083	86,785	21,696
League phase	(Portugal) FC Porto	23,053	109,838	21,968
League phase	(England) Nottingham Forest FC	22,865	132,703	22,117
League phase	(Belgium) KRC Genk	22,761	155,464	22,209
Play-offs
Semi-final	sc Heerenveen	19,334	19,334	19,334

=== Away supporters ===
Round	Opponent	Attendance	Total attendance	Average
Eredivisie
2	Sparta Rotterdam	500	500	500
4	PEC Zwolle	500	1,000	500
6	Fortuna Sittard	629	1,629	543
8	Feyenoord	1,029	2,658	665
10	AZ	750	3,408	682
13	Telstar	400	3,808	635
14	Go Ahead Eagles	400	4,208	601
16	NAC Breda	700	4,908	614
19	FC Volendam	400	5,308	590
21	sc Heerenveen	612	5,920	592
18	N.E.C.	500	6,420	584
23	FC Groningen	466	6,886	574
26	Heracles Almelo	500	7,386	568
27	FC Twente	1,000	8,386	599
29	PSV	1,600	9,986	666
31	Excelsior Rotterdam	400	10,386	649
33	Ajax	1,200	11,586	682
KNVB Cup
Second round	TOP Oss	450	450	450
UEFA Europa League
Second qualifying round	(Moldova) FC Sheriff Tiraspol	253	253	253
Third qualifying round	(Switzerland) Servette FC	1,950	2,203	1,102
Play-off round	(Bosnia and Herzegovina) HŠK Zrinjski Mostar	153	2,356	785
League phase	(Norway) SK Brann	380	2,736	684
League phase	(Germany) SC Freiburg	2,250	4,986	997
League phase	(Spain) Real Betis	3,385	8,371	1,395
League phase	(Scotland) Celtic FC	2,880	11,251	1,607
Play-offs
Final	Ajax	400	400	400
