= Yoann Cathline =

French footballer (born 2002)

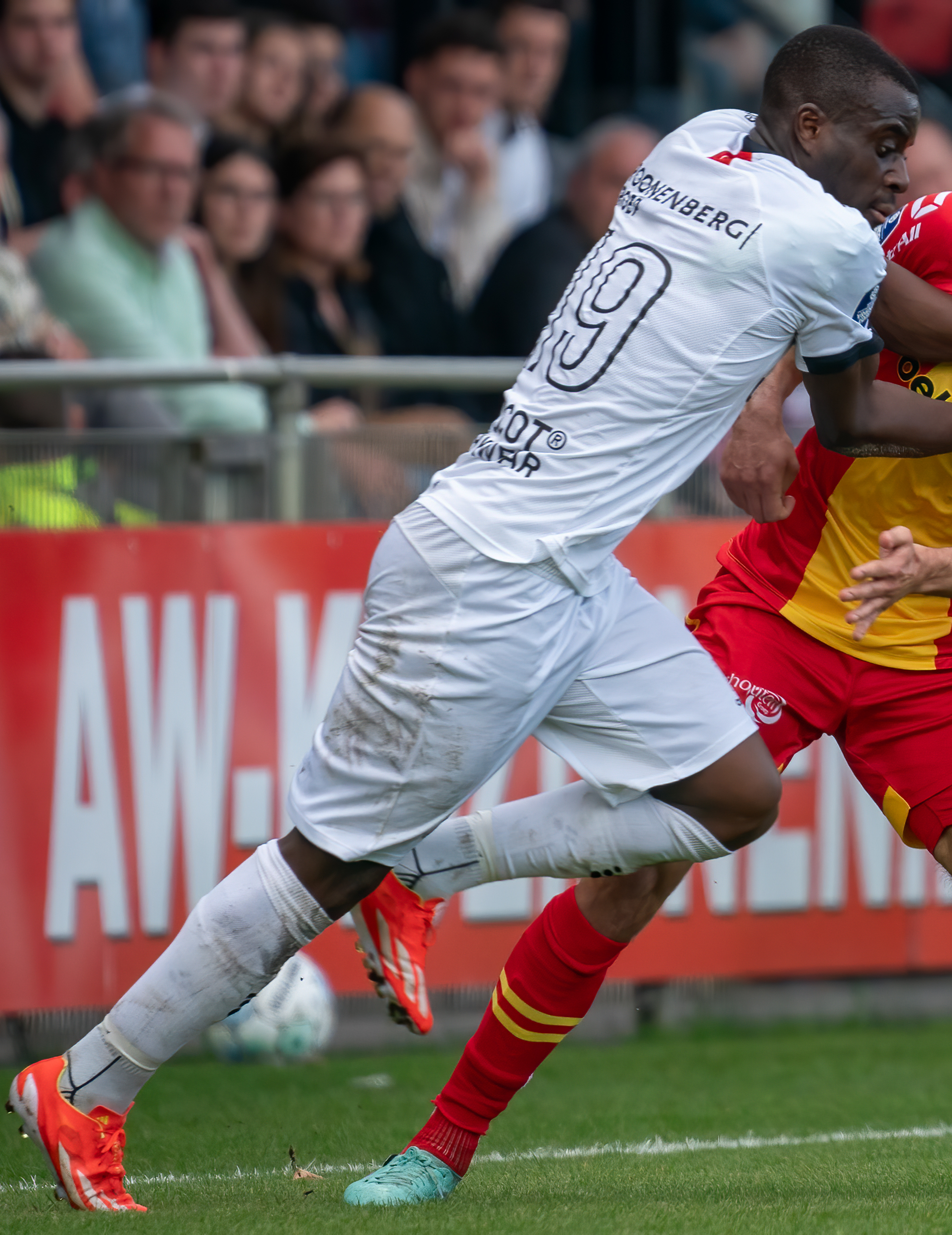
- Cathline in 2024 with Almere City

Personal information
- Date of birth: 22 July 2002 (age 24)
- Place of birth: Champigny-sur-Marne, France
- Height: 1.76 m (5 ft 9 in)
- Position: Forward

Team information
- Current team: Utrecht
- Number: 10

Youth career
- 2008–2014: Champigny FC 94
- 2014–2017: Créteil
- 2017–2019: Torcy
- 2019–2021: Guingamp

Senior career*
Years	Team	Apps	(Gls)
2020–2022	Guingamp II	8	(2)
2021–2022	Guingamp	25	(1)
2022	Lorient II	1	(0)
2022–	Lorient	23	(1)
2023–2024	→ Almere City (loan)	28	(4)
2024–2025	→ Utrecht (loan)	25	(6)
2025–	Utrecht	35	(5)

International career^{‡}
2021–2022	France U20	8	(2)
- * Club domestic league appearances and goals as of 18 October 2026 ‡ National team caps and goals as of 12 June 2022

Yoann Cathline (born 22 July 2002) is a French professional footballer who plays as a forward for Eredivisie club Utrecht, on loan from Ligue 1 club Lorient.

== Club career ==
=== Guingamp ===
Yoann Cathline came through the ranks of US Torcy, before joining the En Avant Guingamp in 2019, where he signed his first contract a year later.

After having already featured in the pro squad the previous season, he made his professional debut for Guingamp on 24 July 2021, coming on as a substitute in a 0–0 Ligue 2 away draw against Le Havre.

=== Lorient ===
On 5 September 2022, Cathline joined Lorient on a five-year deal.

On 21 August 2023, Cathline moved on a season-long loan to Almere City in the Netherlands.

On 23 July 2024, Cathline joined another Dutch club Utrecht on loan.

== Personal life ==
Born in France, Cathline is of Ivorian descent.

== Career statistics ==
As of match played 18 October 2026

Appearances and goals by club, season and competition
Club	Season	League			National cup		Europe		Other		Total	
Club	Season	Division	Apps	Goals	Apps	Goals	Apps	Goals	Apps	Goals	Apps	Goals
Guingamp II	2020–21	CFA 2	3	0	—		—		—		3	0
Guingamp II	2021–22	CFA 2	5	2	—		—		—		5	2
Guingamp II	Total		8	2	—		—		—		8	2
Guingamp	2021–22	Ligue 2	20	1	2	0	—		—		22	1
Guingamp	2022–23	Ligue 2	5	0	0	0	—		—		5	0
Guingamp	Total		25	1	2	0	—		—		27	1
Lorient II	2022–23	CFA 2	1	0	—		—		—		1	0
Lorient	2022–23	Ligue 1	23	1	3	2	—		—		26	3
Almere City (loan)	2023–24	Eredivisie	28	4	3	2	—		—		31	6
Utrecht (loan)	2024–25	Eredivisie	25	6	4	0	—		—		29	6
Utrecht	2025–26	Eredivisie	26	3	2	0	8 (Note: Appearances in UEFA Europa League)	0	1 (Note: Appearance in European play-offs)	0	37	3
Utrecht	2026–27	Eredivisie	9	2	0	0	—		—		9	2
Utrecht	Total		35	5	2	0	8	0	1	0	46	5
Career total			135	19	14	4	8	0	1	0	168	23

== Honours ==
Individual

- Eredivisie Team of the Month: April 2025
