= David Min (footballer) =

Dutch footballer

Personal information
- Date of birth: 23 June 1999 (age 27)
- Place of birth: Wormerveer, Netherlands
- Height: 1.94 m (6 ft 4 in)
- Position: Forward

Team information
- Current team: Arminia Bielefeld (on loan from Utrecht)
- Number: 9

Youth career
- –2018: Fortuna Wormerveer
- 2018–2020: RKC Waalwijk

Senior career*
Years	Team	Apps	(Gls)
2018–2024	RKC Waalwijk	34	(11)
2022–2023	→ Telstar (loan)	32	(7)
2024–	Utrecht	52	(7)
2026–	→ Arminia Bielefeld (loan)	0	(0)
- * Club domestic league appearances and goals as of 30 August 2026

David Min (born 23 June 1999) is a Dutch professional footballer who plays as a forward for 2. Bundesliga club Arminia Bielefeld, on loan from Eredivisie club Utrecht.

== Career ==
On 15 August 2022, Min was loaned to Telstar for the season.

In the 2023–24 season, as Min returned to RKC Waalwijk, where he proved a critical piece in the teams efforts to avoid relegation. He scored 10 goals that season, including a critical hat-trick against Heracles Almelo that saved Waalwijk from the drop.

On 31 May 2024, Min signed a four-year contract with Utrecht, beginning in the 2024–25 season. Over two seasons in Utrecht he also gained European experience, making ten appearances in the UEFA Europa League – five in qualifying and five in the league phase – and scoring once.

On 30 August 2026, shortly before the close of the summer transfer window, Min joined 2. Bundesliga club Arminia Bielefeld on loan for the remainder of the 2026–27 season. Sporting director Michael Mutzel said the club had been tracking Min for some time and pointed to his physicality and hold-up play as the profile they were looking for in a centre-forward. According to De Telegraaf, the agreement includes a purchase option of €2 million; Min's contract with Utrecht runs until June 2028.

== Career statistics ==
As of match played 30 August 2026

Appearances and goals by club, season and competition
Club	Season	League			National cup		Europe		Other		Total	
Club	Season	Division	Apps	Goals	Apps	Goals	Apps	Goals	Apps	Goals	Apps	Goals
RKC Waalwijk	2020–21	Eredivisie	5	1	—		—		—		5	1
RKC Waalwijk	2023–24	Eredivisie	29	10	—		—		—		29	10
RKC Waalwijk	Total		34	11	—		—		—		34	11
Telstar (loan)	2022–23	Eerste Divisie	32	7	1	0	—		—		33	7
Utrecht	2024–25	Eredivisie	27	3	3	2	—		—		30	5
Utrecht	2025–26	Eredivisie	23	4	0	0	10 (Note: Appearances in UEFA Europa League)	1	—		33	5
Utrecht	2026–27	Eredivisie	2	0	0	0	—		—		2	0
Utrecht	Total		52	7	3	2	10	1	—		65	10
Arminia Bielefeld (loan)	2026–27	2. Bundesliga	0	0	0	0	—		—		0	0
Career total			118	25	4	2	10	1	0	0	132	28
