= Oualid Agougil =

Dutch footballer (born 2005)

Personal information
- Date of birth: 7 August 2005 (age 21)
- Place of birth: Netherlands
- Position: Defender

Team information
- Current team: Jong Utrecht

Youth career
  - 2016: Unitas '30
- 2016–2019: NAC Breda
- 2019–2022: Ajax

Senior career*
Years	Team	Apps	(Gls)
2022–2024	Jong Ajax	31	(2)
2024–	Jong Utrecht	48	(0)
2025–	Utrecht	8	(0)

International career^{‡}
2020–2021	Netherlands U15	5	(0)
2021–2022	Netherlands U17	7	(0)
2022–2023	Netherlands U18	4	(0)
2023–2024	Netherlands U19	8	(0)
Medal record
Men's football
Representing Netherlands
UEFA European Under-17 Championship
Runner-up	2022 Israel
- * Club domestic league appearances and goals as of 18 October 2026 ‡ National team caps and goals as of 26 March 2024

Oualid Agougil (born 7 August 2005) is a Dutch professional footballer who plays as a defender for Jong Utrecht. He committed to play for the Morocco national team.

== Club career ==
From Etten-Leur, in 2016 Agougil joined the youth academy at NAC Breda having previously played for Unitas '30. He signed for AFC Ajax in 2019. In March 2021, aged 15 years-old, he agreed a three-year contract with the Amsterdam club. A left back, he captained the Ajax U18 side. He made his professional debut on 28 April 2023, appearing for Jong Ajax as a second-half substitute in the Eerste Divisie in an away win against VVV Venlo. He scored his first professional league goals when he scored a brace for Jong Ajax in a 4–2 away defeat to FC Emmen on 29 March 2024 in the Eerste Divisie.

He agreed an 18-month contract with Jong Utrecht in October 2024. He made his debut for the club in the Eerste Divisie in a 3–1 home defeat to Roda JC the following month.

== International career ==
Agougil was selected for the 2022 UEFA European Under-17 Championship, and was part of the Netherlands U-17 side that reached the final. On 23 March 2023, he featured for the Netherlands U-18 side that triumphed in a resounding 5–1 victory over Saudi Arabia U18, playing as a starter. Later that year, he also started for the Netherlands national under-19 football team in a 2–0 away win over Italy U-19 on 11 September 2023.

On 16 March 2026, Agougil's request to switch international allegiance to Morocco was approved by FIFA.

== Personal life ==
Of Moroccan heritage, he is the brother of Moroccan youth international and NAC Breda footballer Sabir Agougil. Their father Ahmed Agougil worked as a hairdresser in Etten-Leur in North Brabant as of 2023.

== Career statistics ==
As of match played 18 October 2026

Appearances and goals by club, season and competition
Club	Season	League			Cup		Europe		Other		Total	
Club	Season	Division	Apps	Goals	Apps	Goals	Apps	Goals	Apps	Goals	Apps	Goals
Jong Ajax	2022–23	Eerste Divisie	1	0	—		—		—		1	0
Jong Ajax	2023–24	Eerste Divisie	30	2	—		—		—		30	2
Jong Ajax	Total		31	2	—		—		—		31	2
Jong Utrecht	2024–25	Eerste Divisie	19	0	—		—		—		19	0
Jong Utrecht	2025–26	Eerste Divisie	24	0	—		—		—		24	0
Jong Utrecht	Total		43	0	—		—		—		43	0
Utrecht	2025–26	Eredivisie	6	0	0	0	0	0	—		6	0
Utrecht	2026–27	Eredivisie	2	0	0	0	0	0	—		2	0
Utrecht	Total		8	0	0	0	0	0	—		8	0
Career total			82	2	0	0	0	0	0	0	82	2
