= Derry Murkin =

English footballer (born 1999)

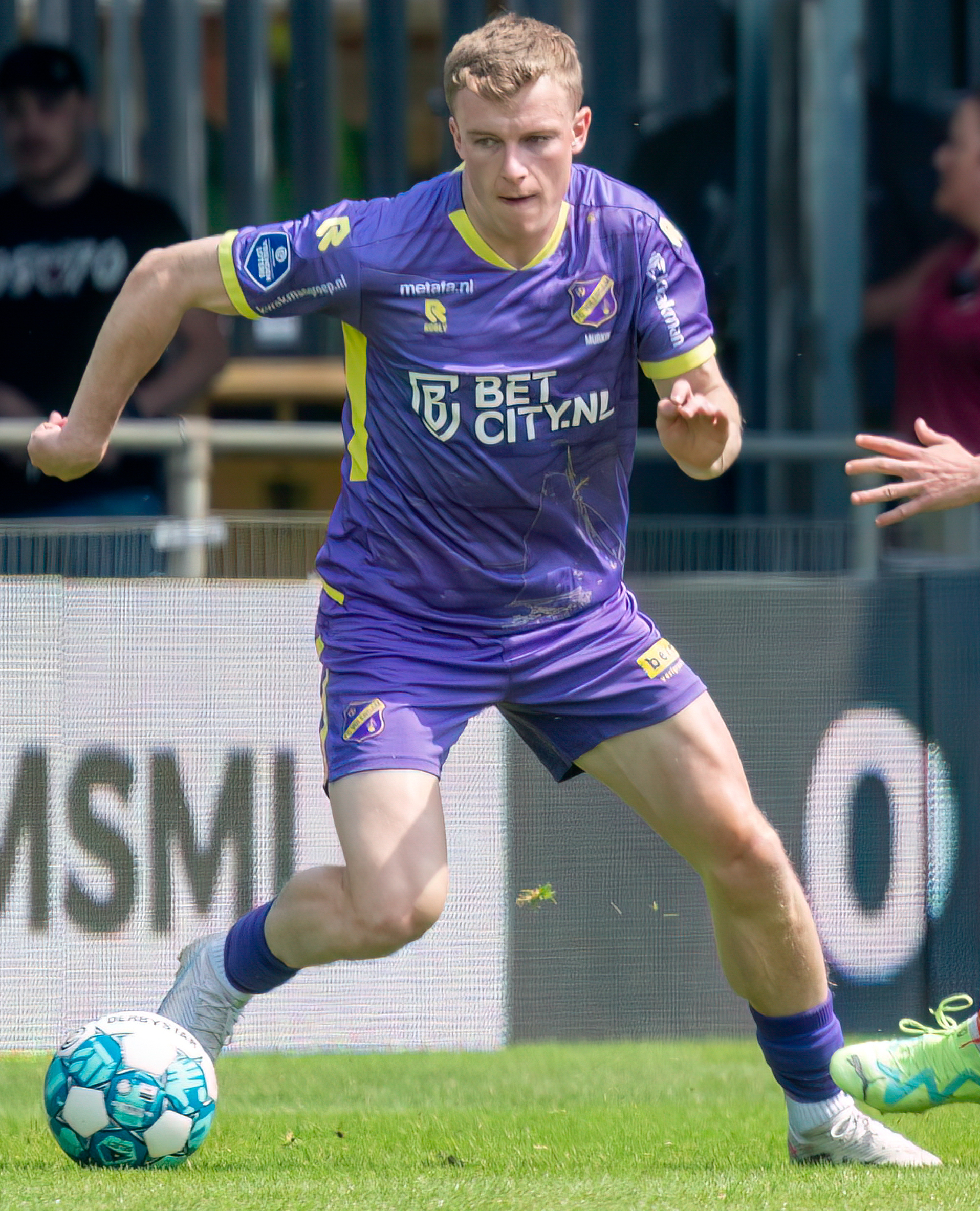
- Murkin with Volendam in 2023

Personal information
- Full name: Derry John Murkin
- Date of birth: 27 July 1999 (age 27)
- Place of birth: Colchester, England
- Height: 6 ft 0 in (1.83 m)
- Positions: Left-back; winger

Team information
- Current team: Derby County
- Number: 2

Youth career
- 2006–2009: ZVV Zaandijk
- 2009–2012: KFC Koog aan de Zaan
- 2012–2013: VPV Purmersteijn
- 2013–2015: Fortuna Wormerveer
- 2015–2019: Volendam

Senior career*
Years	Team	Apps	(Gls)
2017–2020	Jong Volendam	42	(23)
2019–2023	Volendam	93	(9)
2023–2025	Schalke 04	54	(1)
2025–2026	Utrecht	9	(2)
2026–	Derby County	12	(0)
- * Club domestic league appearances and goals as of 21:16, 21 April 2026 (UTC)

Derry John Murkin (born 27 July 1999) is an English professional footballer who plays as a left-back for EFL Championship club Derby County.

Murkin started his footballing career at Volendam in 2015, with his first senior appearances being at Jong Volendam, before progressing to the first team in 2019. In 2023, Murkin would leave the Netherlands to join Schalke 04 of Germany for two season before returning to the Netherlands where he joined Utrecht in 2025. In February 2026, Murkin moved to England and signed with Derby County.

== Early life ==
Murkin was born in Colchester before his mother's job saw his family relocate to the Netherlands at the age of four.

== Career ==
=== Volendam ===
Murkin played youth football for ZVV Zaandijk, KFC Koog aan de Zaan, VPV Purmersteijn, and Fortuna Wormerveer, before joining Volendam's youth academy in 2015. In the 2018–19 season, he scored 21 goals in 34 appearances for Jong FC Volendam, the second team, helping them to a Derde Divisie league title. Halfway through the 2018–19 season, Murkin also made his professional first-team debut for Volendam, coming on as a substitute in a 3–1 loss to Eindhoven in the Eerste Divisie on 18 January 2019. He scored his first goal for Volendam on 22 November 2019, giving the Palingboeren a 2–0 lead in the 32nd minute, which eventually proved decisive in the 2–1 away victory against Excelsior.

Murkin made his breakthrough in the 2020–21 season, as he was repositioned as a left-back under head coach Wim Jonk, due to Gijs Smal's departure to Twente. He made six goals and provided seven assists in 32 total appearances that season, and his performances earned him the award of Volendam Talent of the season.

=== Schalke 04 ===
On 30 August 2023, Murkin signed a three-year contract with German 2. Bundesliga club Schalke 04. He made his debut for Die Königsblauen on 2 September in a league game against Wehen Wiesbaden, replacing Sōichirō Kōzuki at half-time, and providing his first assist nine minutes later in a 1–1 draw. On 16 September he scored his first goal for the club equalising the score to 2–2, and eventually helping his side to a 4–3 home victory against 1. FC Magdeburg. In two seasons in Schalke, Murkin played 57 times, scoring once.

=== Utrecht ===
On 27 May 2025, Murkin joined Dutch Eredivisie side Utrecht on a four-year deal. The move was reported to involve a fee of €1.2 million, potentially rising to €1.5 million with bonuses. Murkin had a year remaining on his contract with Schalke and had declined to extend his stay. Schalke's sporting director, Youri Mulder, described the transfer as a pragmatic decision, citing the player's age, contract status, and market value. Murkin played 22 times for Utrecht, scoring twice.

=== Derby County ===
On 2 February 2026, Murkin joined English Championship side Derby County on a deal until June 2029. Murkin made his Derby debut on 7 February 2026 in a 2–1 defeat to Ipswich Town. He registered his first two assists for Derby in a 3–1 victory over Blackburn Rovers on 28 February 2026 and earned Player of the Match for his performance. Murkin made 12 appearances for Derby County in his first season at the club, assisting for three goals, his season ended two games early as he sustained a hamstring injury.

During his rehabilitation from the injury, Murkin was set to play in an under-21 fixture for Derby County on 14 August 2026 but was forced to withdraw during the warm-up after being named in the starting 11, it was later revealed that Murkin had sustained another hamstring injury and was due for another four months on the sidelines.

== Career statistics ==
As of match played 21 April 2026

Appearances and goals by club, season and competition
Club	Season	League			Cup		League Cup		Europe		Other		Total	
Club	Season	Division	Apps	Goals	Apps	Goals	Apps	Goals	Apps	Goals	Apps	Goals	Apps	Goals
Jong Volendam	2017–18	Derde Divisie	4	0	—		—		—		2 (Note: Appearances in promotion play-offs)	1	6	1
Jong Volendam	2018–19	Derde Divisie	34	21	—		—		—		—		34	21
Jong Volendam	2019–20	Tweede Divisie	2	2	—		—		—		—		2	2
Jong Volendam	2021–22	Tweede Divisie	2	0	—		—		—		—		2	0
Jong Volendam	Total		42	23	—		—		—		2	1	44	24
Volendam	2018–19	Eerste Divisie	5	0	0	0	—		—		—		5	0
Volendam	2019–20	Eerste Divisie	20	3	1	0	—		—		—		21	3
Volendam	2020–21	Eerste Divisie	30	6	1	0	—		—		1	0	32	6
Volendam	2021–22	Eerste Divisie	4	0	0	0	—		—		—		4	0
Volendam	2022–23	Eredivisie	32	0	2	0	—		—		—		34	0
Volendam	2023–24	Eredivisie	2	0	0	0	—		—		—		2	0
Volendam	Total		93	9	4	0	—		—		1	0	98	9
Schalke 04	2023–24	2. Bundesliga	23	1	1	0	—		—		—		24	1
Schalke 04	2024–25	2. Bundesliga	31	0	2	0	—		—		—		33	0
Schalke 04	Total		54	1	3	0	—		—		—		57	1
Utrecht	2025–26	Eredivisie	9	2	1	0	—		12 (Note: Appearances in UEFA Europa League)	0	—		22	2
Derby County	2025–26	EFL Championship	12	0	—		—		—		—		12	0
Derby County	2026–27	EFL Championship	0	0	0	0	0	0	—		—		0	0
Derby County	Total		12	0	0	0	0	0	—		—		12	0
Career total			210	35	8	0	0	0	12	0	3	1	233	36

== Honours ==
Jong Volendam

- Derde Divisie Sunday: 2018–19

Individual

- FC Volendam Talent of the season: 2020–21
