= Adrian Blake =

English footballer (born 2005)

Personal information
- Full name: Adrian Blake
- Date of birth: 15 July 2005 (age 21)
- Place of birth: Islington, England
- Position: Left winger

Team information
- Current team: Utrecht
- Number: 15

Youth career
- 2013–2022: Watford

Senior career*
Years	Team	Apps	(Gls)
2022–2023	Watford	1	(0)
2023–2025	Jong Utrecht	47	(6)
2024–	Utrecht	54	(8)

International career^{‡}
2023	England U18	3	(1)
2023	England U19	5	(0)
- * Club domestic league appearances and goals as of 18 October 2026 ‡ National team caps and goals as of 10:36, 19 October 2023 (UTC)

Adrian Miles Heris F. Stennett-Blake (born 15 July 2005) is an English professional footballer who plays as a left winger for Eredivisie club Utrecht.

== Career ==
Born in Islington, Blake joined Watford in 2013.

Blake made his senior Watford debut on 23 August 2022 when coming on as a second-half substitute in a 2–0 home defeat to Milton Keynes Dons in the second round of the EFL Cup. He made his EFL Championship debut on 8 May 2023 when coming on as a second-half substitute in a 2–0 home win against Stoke City on the last day of the season.

On 12 June 2023, Blake signed for Eredivisie side Utrecht on a four-year deal.

== International career ==
On 9 June 2023, Blake made his England U18 debut during a 2–2 draw with Norway at the Lisbon International Tournament.

On 6 September 2023, Blake made his England U19 debut during a 1–0 defeat to Germany in Oliva.

== Personal life ==
Born in England, Blake is of Jamaican descent.

== Career statistics ==
=== Club ===
As of 18 October 2026.

Appearances and goals by club, season and competition
Club	Season	League			National cup (Note: Includes FA Cup, KNVB Cup)		League Cup (Note: Includes EFL Cup)		Europe		Other		Total	
Club	Season	Division	Apps	Goals	Apps	Goals	Apps	Goals	Apps	Goals	Apps	Goals	Apps	Goals
Watford	2022–23	Championship	1	0	1	0	1	0	—		0	0	3	0
Jong Utrecht	2023–24	Eerste Divisie	32	3	—		—		—		—		32	3
Jong Utrecht	2024–25	Eerste Divisie	15	3	—		—		—		—		15	3
Jong Utrecht	Total		47	6	—		—		—		—		47	6
Utrecht	2023–24	Eredivisie	5	1	—		—		—		—		5	1
Utrecht	2024–25	Eredivisie	17	3	2	1	—		—		—		19	4
Utrecht	2025–26	Eredivisie	23	2	1	0	—		13 (Note: Appearances in UEFA Europa League)	2	1 (Note: Appearance in European play-offs)	0	38	4
Utrecht	2026–27	Eredivisie	9	2	0	0	—		—		—		9	2
Utrecht	Total		54	8	3	1	—		13	2	1	0	71	11
Career total			102	14	4	1	1	0	13	2	1	0	121	17
