= Souffian El Karouani =

Moroccan footballer (born 2000)

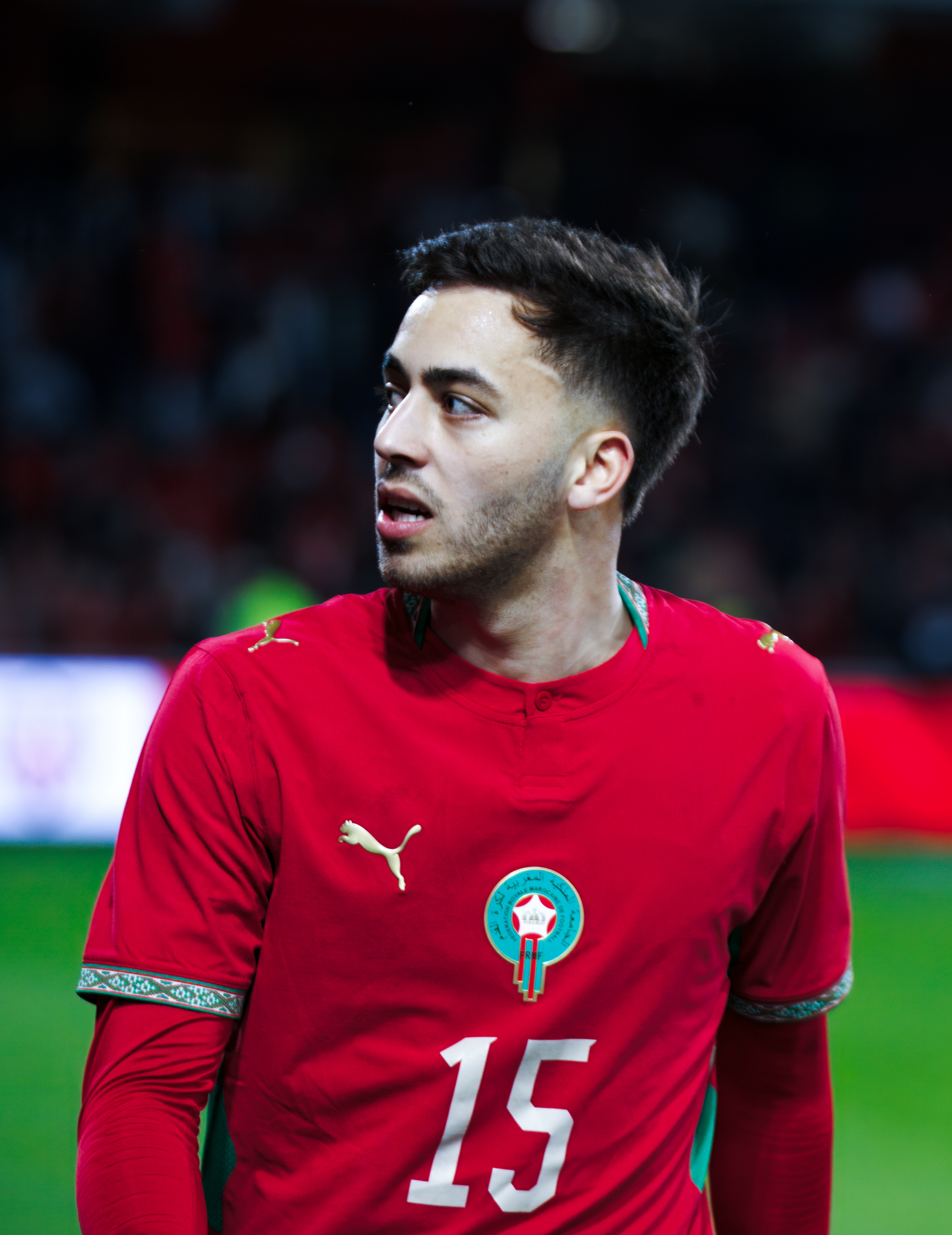
- El Karouani with Morocco in 2026

Personal information
- Date of birth: 19 October 2000 (age 26)
- Place of birth: 's-Hertogenbosch, Netherlands
- Height: 1.78 m (5 ft 10 in)
- Position: Left-back

Team information
- Current team: Benfica (on loan from Al-Qadsiah)
- Number: 34

Youth career
- –2008: TGG
- 2008–2012: Den Bosch
- 2012–?: BVV
- ?–2017: Elinkwijk
- 2017–2019: NEC

Senior career*
Years	Team	Apps	(Gls)
2019–2023	NEC	104	(5)
2023–2026	Utrecht	97	(4)
2026–	Al-Qadsiah	0	(0)
2026–	→ Benfica (loan)	0	(0)

International career^{‡}
2021–	Morocco	6	(0)
- * Club domestic league appearances and goals as of 16:25, 17 May 2026 (UTC) ‡ National team caps and goals as of 31 March 2026

Souffian El Karouani (Arabic: سفيان الكرواني; born 19 October 2000) is a professional footballer who plays as a left-back for Primeira Liga club Benfica, on loan from Saudi Pro League club Al-Qadsiah. Born in the Netherlands, he plays for the Morocco national team.

== Club career ==
=== Youth career ===
El Karouani played in the youth teams of TGG, Den Bosch, BVV, Elinkwijk and NEC.

=== NEC ===
==== 2019–20 season ====
In 2019, he was promoted to NEC's first team. He made his debut for the club on 9 August 2019, in the home match against FC Eindhoven which was lost 1–2. El Karouani came on as a substitute for Anthony Musaba in the 68th minute. On 2 July 2020, he signed a one-year contract with NEC which included an option on another season.

==== 2020–21 season ====
In the 2020–21 season, he became the starting left back in an attacking NEC led by head coach Rogier Meijer. On 3 October, El Karouani scored his first goal for the club in the home game against FC Eindhoven, which was won 6–0. On 23 May 2021, El Karouani won promotion to the Eredivisie with NEC, by beating NAC Breda 1–2 in the final of the play-offs. He provided the assist to the winning goal by Jonathan Okita, which meant that the club returned to the highest Dutch division after an absence of four year. He finished the season with 43 appearances in which he scored 3 goals, and his 8 assists were the most in the team.

=== Utrecht ===
On 26 April 2023, El Karouani signed a three-year contract with Utrecht, set to commence from the 2023–24 season.

=== Al-Qadsiah ===
On 4 June 2026, Saudi Pro League club Al-Qadsiah signed El Karouani on a contract running until the summer of 2029.

==== Loan to Benfica ====
On 1 September 2026, Al-Qadsiah loaned El Karouani to Primeira Liga club Benfica ahead of the rest of the 2026–27 season which also includes a buy option.

== International career ==
Born in the Netherlands, El Karouani is Moroccan by descent. He debuted with the Morocco national team in a 3–0 2022 FIFA World Cup qualification win over Guinea-Bissau on 9 October 2021.

== Career statistics ==
=== Club ===
As of match played 21 May 2026

Appearances and goals by club, season and competition
Club	Season	League			KNVB Cup		Continental		Other		Total	
Club	Season	Division	Apps	Goals	Apps	Goals	Apps	Goals	Apps	Goals	Apps	Goals
NEC	2019–20	Eerste Divisie	2	0	0	0	—		—		2	0
NEC	2020–21 (Note: Season curtailed due to COVID-19 pandemic in the Netherlands)	Eerste Divisie	38	3	2	0	—		3 (Note: Appearance(s) in Eerste Divisie promotion play-offs)	0	43	3
NEC	2021–22	Eredivisie	31	0	2	0	—		—		33	0
NEC	2022–23	Eredivisie	33	2	3	1	—		—		36	3
NEC	Total		104	5	7	1	—		3	0	114	6
Utrecht	2023–24	Eredivisie	31	0	2	0	—		—		33	0
Utrecht	2024–25	Eredivisie	34	2	2	0	—		—		36	2
Utrecht	2025–26	Eredivisie	32	2	2	0	14 (Note: Appearances in UEFA Europa League)	1	1 (Note: Appearance in European play-offs)	1	49	4
Utrecht	Total		97	4	6	0	14	1	1	1	118	6
Career total			201	9	13	1	14	1	4	1	232	12

=== International ===
As of match played 31 March 2026

Appearances and goals by national team and year
National team	Year	Apps	Goals
Morocco	2021	3	0
Morocco	2025	2	0
Morocco	2026	1	0
Total		6	0

== Honours ==
Individual

- Eredivisie Team of the Month: May 2022, November 2022, March 2025, April 2025
