= Niklas Vesterlund =

Danish footballer (born 1999)

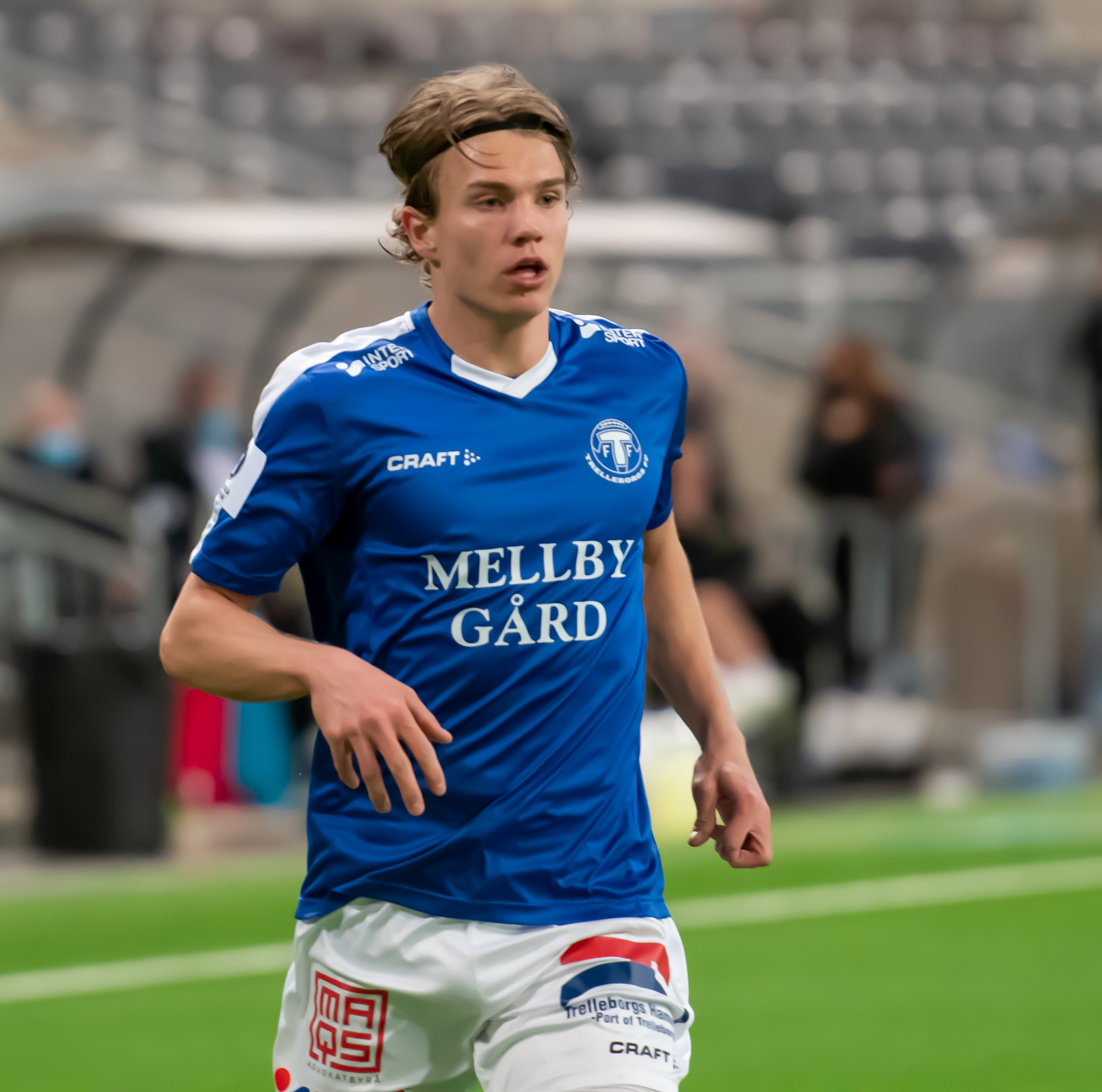

Personal information
- Full name: Niklas Brøndsted Vesterlund Nielsen
- Date of birth: 6 June 1999 (age 27)
- Height: 1.85 m (6 ft 1 in)
- Position: Right-back

Team information
- Current team: Utrecht
- Number: 23

Youth career
- Vanløse
- Copenhagen

Senior career*
Years	Team	Apps	(Gls)
2019–2021	Trelleborg	49	(2)
2021–2024	Tromsø	78	(9)
2024–	Utrecht	43	(2)

International career^{‡}
2016	Denmark U17	6	(0)
2017–2018	Denmark U19	6	(0)
2018–2019	Denmark U20	3	(0)
- * Club domestic league appearances and goals as of 18 October 2026 ‡ National team caps and goals as of 5 June 2021

Niklas Vesterlund (born 6 June 1999) is a Danish professional footballer who plays as a right-back for Eredivisie club Utrecht.

== Career ==
=== Tromsø ===
In May 2021, Vesterlund signed for Norwegian team Tromsø. Originally he signed a contract lasting until the end of the 2023 season, but in late 2022 he extended his contract with an additional two years, keeping him at the club until the end of the 2025 season.

=== Utrecht ===
At the start of 2024, Vesterlund signed for Eredivisie club Utrecht. He signed a contract until mid-2027 with an option to extend the contract one additional year.

== Career statistics ==
As of 18 October 2026

Appearances and goals by club, season and competition
Club	Season	League			National cup		Europe		Other		Total	
Club	Season	Division	Apps	Goals	Apps	Goals	Apps	Goals	Apps	Goals	Apps	Goals
Trelleborg	2019	Superettan	21	0	0	0	—		—		21	0
Trelleborg	2020	Superettan	24	2	5	1	—		2 (Note: Appearances in Superettan Playoffs)	0	31	3
Trelleborg	2021	Superettan	4	0	0	0	—		—		4	0
Trelleborg	Total		49	2	5	1	—		2	0	56	3
Tromsø	2021	Eliteserien	25	2	0	0	—		—		25	2
Tromsø	2022	Eliteserien	23	2	3	0	—		—		26	2
Tromsø	2023	Eliteserien	30	5	2	0	—		—		32	5
Tromsø	Total		78	9	5	0	—		—		83	9
Utrecht	2023–24	Eredivisie	9	0	0	0	—		1 (Note: Appearance in Eredivisie European playoffs)	0	10	0
Utrecht	2024–25	Eredivisie	8	1	2	0	—		—		10	0
Utrecht	2025–26	Eredivisie	18	1	1	0	7 (Note: Appearances in UEFA Europa League)	0	1 (Note: Appearance in European play-offs)	0	27	1
Utrecht	2026–27	Eredivisie	8	0	0	0	—		—		8	0
Utrecht	Total		43	2	3	0	6	0	2	0	55	2
Career total			170	13	13	1	7	0	4	0	194	13
