= Jesper Karlsson =

Swedish footballer (born 1998)

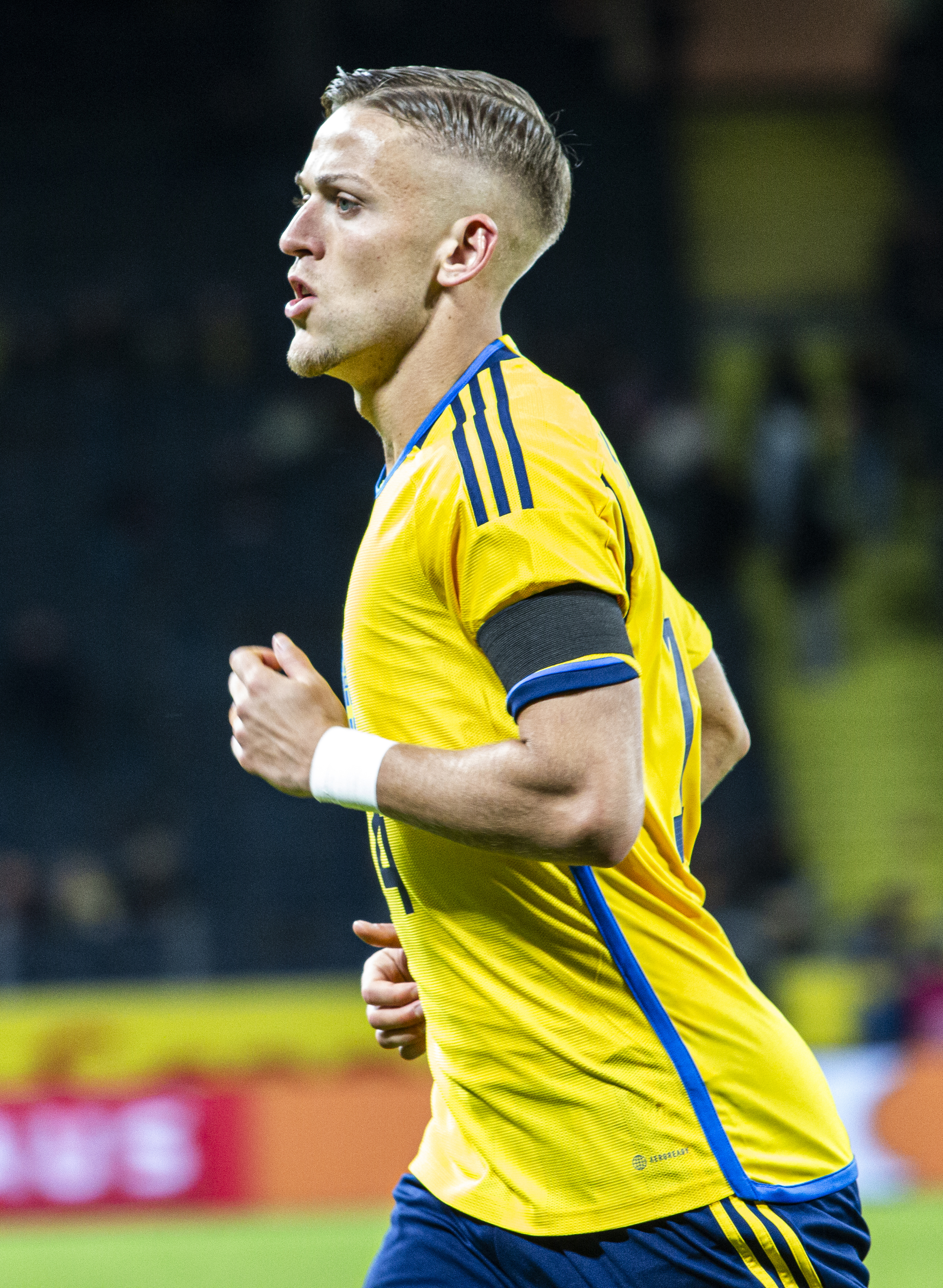
- Karlsson playing for Sweden in 2023

Personal information
- Full name: Karl Jesper Karlsson
- Date of birth: 25 July 1998 (age 28)
- Place of birth: Falkenberg, Sweden
- Height: 1.80 m (5 ft 11 in)
- Positions: Attacking midfielder; left winger

Team information
- Current team: Servette (on loan from Bologna)
- Number: 21

Youth career
- 2003–2014: IF Böljan
- 2015: Falkenbergs FF

Senior career*
Years	Team	Apps	(Gls)
2013–2014	IF Böljan	22	(12)
2016	Falkenbergs FF	26	(7)
2017–2020	IF Elfsborg	83	(19)
2020–2023	AZ	89	(35)
2023–	Bologna	14	(1)
2025	→ Lecce (loan)	13	(1)
2025–2026	→ Aberdeen (loan)	18	(5)
2026	→ Utrecht (loan)	16	(4)
2026–	→ Servette (loan)	3	(0)

International career^{‡}
2015–2017	Sweden U19	15	(6)
2020	Sweden U21	5	(6)
2020–2023	Sweden	14	(5)
- * Club domestic league appearances and goals as of 19 September 2026 ‡ National team caps and goals as of 19:36, 12 October 2023 (UTC)

Karl Jesper Karlsson (born 25 July 1998) is a Swedish professional footballer who plays as an attacking midfielder or left winger for Swiss Super League club Servette, on loan from Serie A club Bologna.

== Club career ==
=== Early career ===
Karlsson started playing in IF Böljan from the age of four. At the age of 14, he received his first-team debut for the club in Division 4. Before the 2015 season, he moved to Falkenbergs FF, and he was offered a first-team contract in the autumn. In November 2015, Karlsson signed a first team contract that extends over the season 2018 with Falkenberg FF. Before he signed the contract, he had also served and trained with English side Brighton & Hove Albion.

=== Falkenbergs FF ===
The premiere of the headlines in 2016 were about Karlsson making his Allsvenskan debut. In the 79th minute he was replaced in instead of Akseli Pelvas, in the match Falkenbergs FF lost 2–0 to IFK Göteborg. On 17 July 2016, Karlsson scored his first two Allsvenskan goals in a 3–3 win against Hammarby IF. In total, he scored seven goals and made two assists during the 2016 season.

=== IF Elfsborg ===
Karlsson transferred from Falkenbergs FF to Swedish top flight IF Elfsborg on 2 December 2016 for a fee of €450,000.

=== AZ ===
On 11 September 2020, Karlsson signed a five-year contract with Dutch Eredivisie club AZ. However, the teams agreed that he stayed at Elfsborg until 28 September. After arriving in Alkmaar, he made his debut on 4 October 2020 in a 4–4 draw against Sparta Rotterdam, in which he provided two assists.

=== Bologna ===
On 23 August 2023, it was announced that Karlsson had joined Italian Serie A club Bologna. On 4 January 2025, Karlsson moved on loan to Lecce for the remainder of the season.

==== Loan to Aberdeen ====
On 1 September 2025, Karlsson joined Scottish Premiership club Aberdeen on a season long loan, reuniting with Jimmy Thelin, who was his manager at Elfsborg. Karlsson was re-called by his parent club Bologna on 22 January 2026.

==== Loan to Utrecht ====
On 23 January 2026, Karlsson returned to the Eredivisie, joining Utrecht on loan until the end of the season.

==== Loan to Servette ====
On 8 September 2026, Karlsson was loaned to Swiss Super League club Servette for the 2026–27 season.

== International career ==
In September 2015, Karlsson made his debut in the Sweden national under-19. He has also represented the Sweden U21 team.

He made his full international debut for Sweden on 9 January 2020 in a friendly game against Moldova.

== Career statistics ==
=== Club ===
As of match played 21 May 2026

Appearances and goals by club, season and competition
Club	Season	League			Cup		Continental		Other		Total	
Club	Season	Division	Apps	Goals	Apps	Goals	Apps	Goals	Apps	Goals	Apps	Goals
Falkenbergs FF	2016	Allsvenskan	26	7	3	0	—		—		29	7
IF Elfsborg	2017	Allsvenskan	14	0	3	1	—		—		17	1
IF Elfsborg	2018	Allsvenskan	22	0	4	1	—		—		26	1
IF Elfsborg	2019	Allsvenskan	25	8	1	1	—		—		26	9
IF Elfsborg	2020	Allsvenskan	22	11	4	1	—		—		26	12
IF Elfsborg	Total		83	19	12	4	—		0	0	95	23
AZ	2020–21	Eredivisie	32	11	1	0	6 (Note: Appearances in UEFA Europa League)	1	–		39	12
AZ	2021–22	Eredivisie	34	15	4	3	9 (Note: One appearance in UEFA Europa League, eight appearances in UEFA Europa Conference League)	1	4 (Note: Appearances in Eredivisie European play-offs)	2	51	21
AZ	2022–23	Eredivisie	23	9	2	2	8 (Note: Appearances in UEFA Europa Conference League)	2	–		33	13
AZ	2023–24	Eredivisie	0	0	0	0	1	0	–		1	0
AZ	Total		89	35	7	5	24	4	4	2	124	46
Bologna	2023–24	Serie A	7	0	1	0	–		–		8	0
Bologna	2024–25	Serie A	7	1	0	0	0	0	–		7	1
Bologna	Total		14	1	1	0	0	0	0	0	15	1
Lecce (loan)	2024–25	Serie A	13	1	0	0	–		–		13	1
Aberdeen (loan)	2025–26	Scottish Premiership	18	5	1	0	6	0	1 (Note: Appearance(s) in Scottish League Cup)	0	26	6
Utrecht (loan)	2025–26	Eredivisie	16	4	0	0	0	0	0	17	4	
Career total			259	72	24	9	30	4	6	2	319	88

=== International ===
As of match played 12 October 2023

Appearances and goals by national team and year
National team	Year	Apps	Goals
Sweden	2020	2	0
Sweden	2021	4	0
Sweden	2022	2	0
Sweden	2023	6	5
Total		14	5

Scores and results list Sweden's goal tally first, score column indicates score after each Karlsson goal.

List of international goals scored by Jesper Karlsson
No.	Date	Venue	Opponent	Score	Result	Competition
1	27 March 2023	Friends Arena, Solna, Sweden	Azerbaijan	4–0	5–0	UEFA Euro 2024 qualifying
2	16 June 2023	Friends Arena, Solna, Sweden	New Zealand	1–1	4–1	Friendly
3	16 June 2023	Friends Arena, Solna, Sweden	New Zealand	3–1	4–1	Friendly
4	12 October 2023	Friends Arena, Solna, Sweden	Moldova	1–0	3–1	Friendly
5	12 October 2023	Friends Arena, Solna, Sweden	Moldova	3–1	3–1	Friendly

== Honours ==
Individual

- Allsvenskan Striker of the Year: 2020
- Eredivisie Player of the Month: December 2021
- Eredivisie Team of the Month: December 2021, March 2022, March 2023
