= Emirhan Demircan =

Turkish footballer (born 2005)

- Demircan with Telstar in 2026

Personal information
- Full name: Emirhan Cüneyt Demircan
- Date of birth: 20 January 2005 (age 21)
- Place of birth: Munich, Germany
- Height: 1.81 m (5 ft 11 in)
- Positions: Winger; forward

Team information
- Current team: Telstar (on loan from Utrecht)
- Number: 8

Youth career
- 2012–2014: TSV Milbertshofen
- 2014–2017: 1860 Munich
- 2017–2024: Bayern Munich

Senior career*
Years	Team	Apps	(Gls)
2023–2025	Bayern Munich II	22	(6)
2025–	Jong Utrecht	27	(6)
2025–	Utrecht	6	(0)
2026–	→ Telstar (loan)	8	(0)

International career^{‡}
2022	Turkey U17	2	(0)
2024	Turkey U19	5	(0)
2024–2025	Turkey U21	5	(0)
- * Club domestic league appearances and goals as of 08:29, 10 November 2026 (UTC) ‡ National team caps and goals as of 14 October 2025

Emirhan Cüneyt Demircan (born 20 January 2005) is a professional footballer who plays as a winger and forward for Eredivisie club Telstar, on loan from Utrecht. Born in Germany, he was a Turkey youth international.

== Club career ==
=== Youth career ===
As a youth player, Demircan joined the youth academy of German side TSV Milbertshofen. In 2014, he joined the youth academy of German side 1860 Munich.

=== Bayern Munich ===
Three years later, he joined the youth academy of Bundesliga side Bayern Munich, where he played in the UEFA Youth League, and was promoted to the club's reserve team in 2023, where he made twenty-two league appearances and scored six goals.

=== Utrecht ===
Ahead of the 2025–26 season, Demircan signed for Dutch side Utrecht.

On 21 July 2026, Demircan joined Eredivisie club Telstar on a one-season loan.

== International career ==
Born in Germany, he is a Turkey youth international. During the summer of 2024, he played for the Turkey national under-19 football team at the 2024 UEFA European Under-19 Championship.

== Style of play ==
Demircan plays as a winger on both sides and is two-footed, he can also be deployed as a forward. German news website Sport1 wrote in 2022 that he "impresses with his technique and speed, making his qualities particularly evident on the wing".

== Career statistics ==
As of match played 7 November 2026

Appearances and goals by club, season and competition
Club	Season	League			Cup (Note: Includes KNVB Cup)		Europe		Other		Total	
Club	Season	Division	Apps	Goals	Apps	Goals	Apps	Goals	Apps	Goals	Apps	Goals
Bayern Munich II	2022–23	Regionalliga Bayern	1	0	—		—		—		1	0
Bayern Munich II	2023–24	Regionalliga Bayern	1	0	—		—		—		1	0
Bayern Munich II	2024–25	Regionalliga Bayern	20	6	—		—		—		20	6
Bayern Munich II	Total		22	6	—		—		—		22	6
Jong Utrecht	2025–26	Eerste Divisie	27	6	—		—		—		27	6
Utrecht	2025–26	Eredivisie	6	0	1	1	0	0	—		7	1
Telstar (loan)	2026–27	Eredivisie	8	0	1	0	—		—		9	0
Career total			63	12	2	1	0	0	0	0	65	13
