= Lushendry Martes =

Dutch footballer (born 2008)

Personal information
- Date of birth: 6 May 2008 (age 18)
- Place of birth: Rotterdam, Netherlands
- Position: Right-back

Team information
- Current team: Sparta Rotterdam
- Number: 2

Youth career
- Rijnmond Hoogvliet Sport
- –2017: Spijkenisse
- 2017–2025: Sparta Rotterdam

Senior career*
Years	Team	Apps	(Gls)
2025–	Jong Sparta	13	(3)
2025–	Sparta Rotterdam	23	(2)

International career^{‡}
2024–2025	Netherlands U17	9	(0)
2025–	Netherlands U18	6	(1)
- * Club domestic league appearances and goals as of 18:43, 25 October 2026 (UTC) ‡ National team caps and goals as of 17 November 2025

Lushendry Martes (born 6 May 2008) is a Dutch professional footballer who plays as a left-back for Eredivisie club Sparta Rotterdam. A Netherlands youth international, Martes is of Curaçao descent.

== Career ==
Martes began playing football in the youth teams of Rijnmond Hoogvliet Sport and VV Spijkenisse, before joining the academy of Sparta Rotterdam at age nine. He progressed through the club's youth ranks and made his first appearances in senior football with the reserve side, Jong Sparta Rotterdam, which competed in the Tweede Divisie during the 2024–25 season.

In June 2025, Martes signed his first professional contract with Sparta Rotterdam, committing his future to the club until 2028.

He made his first-team debut on 18 December 2025 in a 5–1 away victory over Willem II in the KNVB Cup. Head coach Maurice Steijn introduced Martes as a second-half substitute for Shurandy Sambo.

After the winter break, Martes made his first competitive start for the senior side. Due to the suspension of Sambo, he was named in the starting line-up for an Eredivisie match against Heracles Almelo on 11 January 2026. Sparta won the match 2–0, with Martes completed the full ninety minutes. As a result of this appearance, Martes became the second-youngest player in the club's history to make a starting debut in the Eredivisie, behind Emmanuel Emegha.

== Career statistics ==
As of match played 28 October 2026

Appearances and goals by club, season and competition
Club	Season	League			National cup		Other		Total	
Club	Season	Division	Apps	Goals	Apps	Goals	Apps	Goals	Apps	Goals
Jong Sparta	2024–25	Tweede Divisie	2	0	—		0	0	2	0
Jong Sparta	2025–26	Tweede Divisie	11	3	—		—		11	3
Jong Sparta	Total		13	3	—		0	0	13	3
Sparta Rotterdam	2025–26	Eredivisie	13	0	2	0	—		15	0
Sparta Rotterdam	2026–27	Eredivisie	10	2	1	0	—		11	2
Sparta Rotterdam	Total		25	2	3	0	—		26	2
Career total			36	5	3	0	0	0	39	5
