= Artem Stepanov =

Ukrainian footballer (born 2007)

Artem Stepanov Артем Степанов
Personal information
- Full name: Artem Romanovych Stepanov
- Date of birth: 10 August 2007 (age 19)
- Place of birth: Lutsk, Ukraine
- Height: 1.92 m (6 ft 4 in)
- Position: Forward

Team information
- Current team: Utrecht (on loan from Bayer Leverkusen)
- Number: 18

Youth career
- 2013–2020: Volyn Lutsk
- 2020–2022: Shakhtar Donetsk
- 2022–2024: Bayer Leverkusen

Senior career*
Years	Team	Apps	(Gls)
2024–	Bayer Leverkusen	0	(0)
2025–2026	→ 1. FC Nürnberg (loan)	13	(0)
2025–2026	→ 1. FC Nürnberg II	1	(1)
2026–	→ Utrecht (loan)	21	(9)

International career^{‡}
2023	Ukraine U16	3	(2)
2023–2024	Ukraine U17	8	(6)
2024	Ukraine U19	2	(0)
2025–	Ukraine U21	7	(1)
- * Club domestic league appearances and goals as of 1 November 2026 ‡ National team caps and goals as of 31 March 2026

Artem Romanovych Stepanov (Ukrainian: Артем Романович Степанов; born 10 August 2007) is a Ukrainian professional footballer who plays as a forward for Eredivisie club Utrecht, on loan from Bundesliga club Bayer Leverkusen.

== Early life ==
Stepanov was born on 10 August 2007 in Lutsk, Ukraine. He is the son of Ukrainian former footballer Roman Stepanov.

== Club career ==
As a youth player, Stepanov joined the youth academy of Ukrainian side Volyn Lutsk. In 2020, he moved to Ukrainian side Shakhtar Donetsk's academy. Two years later, he fled to Germany due to the Russian invasion of Ukraine (2022). There Stepanov joined the youth academy of Bundesliga side Bayer Leverkusen and was promoted to the club's first team in 2024. On 26 November, he made his debut for Leverkusen in a 5–0 home win over Red Bull Salzburg in the UEFA Champions League. In the summer of 2025, Stepanov moved to 2. Bundesliga club 1. FC Nürnberg, on loan for the 2025–26 season. In January 2026, the contract in Nuremberg was terminated and Stepanov continued his loan at FC Utrecht.

== Style of play ==
Stepanov plays as a forward and is right-footed. Ukrainian news website Sport.ua wrote that he "stands out against his peers for his power[,]... knows how to use his size and win power struggles... [He is] a classic number nine... focused on finishing and needs the support of midfielders".

== Career statistics ==
As of match played 20 September 2026

Appearances and goals by club, season and competition
Club	Season	League			Cup		Europe		Other		Total	
Club	Season	Division	Apps	Goals	Apps	Goals	Apps	Goals	Apps	Goals	Apps	Goals
Bayer Leverkusen	2024–25	Bundesliga	0	0	0	0	2 (Note: Appearances in UEFA Champions League)	0	—		2	0
1. FC Nürnberg (loan)	2025–26	2. Bundesliga	13	0	1	1	—		—		14	1
1. FC Nürnberg II (loan)	2025–26	Regionalliga Bayern	1	1	—		—		—		1	1
Utrecht (loan)	2025–26	Eredivisie	14	4	—		0	0	1 (Note: Appearance in European play-offs)	1	15	5
Utrecht (loan)	2026–27	Eredivisie	6	5	0	0	—		—		6	5
Utrecht (loan)	Total		20	9	0	0	0	0	1	0	21	10
Career total			34	10	1	1	2	0	1	1	38	12
