= Matisse Didden =

Belgian footballer (born 2001)

Personal information
- Date of birth: 8 October 2001 (age 25)
- Place of birth: As, Belgium
- Height: 1.98 m (6 ft 6 in)
- Position: Centre-back

Team information
- Current team: Utrecht
- Number: 40

Youth career
- Patro Eisden

Senior career*
Years	Team	Apps	(Gls)
2018	Patro Eisden	5	(0)
2022–2023	Jong Genk	22	(2)
2018–2023	Genk	1	(0)
2023–2024	Roda JC	32	(1)
2024–	Utrecht	47	(4)
- * Club domestic league appearances and goals as of 22:00, 18 October 2026 (UTC)

Matisse Didden (born 8 October 2001) is a Belgian professional footballer who plays as a centre-back for Eredivisie club Utrecht.

== Youth career ==
Didden was born in As, Belgium and attended Stedelijke Humaniora Dilsen. He played youth football for Niel SK, Bocholter VV, and Patro Eisden Maasmechelen before joining Genk's academy in 2018. Didden made his UEFA Youth League debut for Genk's U19s in a 0–0 draw away to Napoli. During the 2022–23 season, he represented Jong Genk in the Challenger Pro League, making 22 appearances and scoring two goals.

== Career ==
On 10 March 2018, aged 16, Didden made his first‑team debut for Patro Eisden in a First Amateur Division match against Dender. He made a total of five senior appearances for the club before leaving to join Genk later that year.

Didden joined Genk in 2018. He was promoted to the first-team squad in February 2021. On 8 March 2022, the club extended his contract until the summer of 2025. Later that year, on 27 August, he made his first‑team debut in a Pro League match, a 4–0 away win over Seraing.

In the summer of 2023, Didden signed a two‑season contract with Dutch club Roda JC. He made his Eerste Divisie debut on 11 August 2023 in a 4–1 win over Helmond Sport. During the season, he captained Roda on several occasions. On 22 January 2024, Didden scored his first league goal for the club in a 3–0 home win against FC Eindhoven.

In the summer of 2024, Didden transferred to fellow Dutch club Utrecht, signing a four-year contract. He made his competitive debut for Utrecht in the Eredivisie on 11 August 2024, against PEC Zwolle. He scored his first goal for the club on 11 November 2025 in a 2–1 win against Ajax.

== Career statistics ==
As of match played 18 October 2026

Appearances and goals by club, season and competition
Club	Season	League			National cup		Europe		Other		Total	
Club	Season	Division	Apps	Goals	Apps	Goals	Apps	Goals	Apps	Goals	Apps	Goals
Patro Eisden	2017–18	First Amateur Division	5	0	—		—		—		5	0
Jong Genk	2022–23	Challenger Pro League	22	2	—		—		—		13	2
Genk	2022–23	Belgian Pro League	1	0	0	0	—		0	0	1	0
Roda JC	2023–24	Eerste Divisie	32	1	1	1	—		2 (Note: Appearance(s) in Eredivisie promotion/relegation playoffs)	0	35	2
Utrecht	2024–25	Eredivisie	16	2	2	0	—		—		18	2
Utrecht	2025–26	Eredivisie	24	2	1	0	7 (Note: Appearance(s) in UEFA Europa League)	0	—		32	2
Utrecht	2026–27	Eredivisie	8	2	0	0	—		—		8	2
Utrecht	Total		48	6	3	0	7	0	—		58	6
Career total			108	9	4	1	7	0	2	0	121	10
