= Alonzo Engwanda =

Belgian association football player (born 2003)

Personal information
- Full name: Alonzo Tim Engwanda-Ongena
- Date of birth: 27 January 2003 (age 23)
- Position: Midfielder

Team information
- Current team: Utrecht
- Number: 27

Youth career
- –2002: RSC Anderlecht

Senior career*
Years	Team	Apps	(Gls)
2022–2024	RSCA Futures	47	(0)
2024–	Utrecht	53	(0)

International career
2020	Belgium U17	3	(1)
2022	Belgium U19	1	(0)
2022	Belgium U20	1	(0)
- * Club domestic league appearances and goals as of 16:33, 17 May 2026 (UTC)

Alonzo Tim Engwanda-Ongena (born 27 January 2003) is a Belgian professional footballer who plays as a midfielder for FC Utrecht. Engwanda was born in Belgium to a Congolese father and a Belgian mother. He played for RSCA Futures, making his debut in 2022 at U19 level. He captained the side prior to signing for FC Utrecht in 2024, agreeing to a four-year contract. He made his debut in the Eredivisie for Utrecht against PEC Zwolle on 11 August 2024.

His brother Nunzio is also a professional footballer.

== Career statistics ==
As of match played 21 May 2026

Appearances and goals by club, season and competition
Club	Season	League			Cup		Europe		Other		Total	
Club	Season	Division	Apps	Goals	Apps	Goals	Apps	Goals	Apps	Goals	Apps	Goals
RSCA Futures	2022–23	Challenger Pro League	27	0	—		—		—		27	0
RSCA Futures	2023–24	Challenger Pro League	20	0	—		—		—		20	0
RSCA Futures	Total		47	0	—		—		—		47	0
Utrecht	2024–25	Eredivisie	21	0	3	0	—		—		24	0
Utrecht	2025–26	Eredivisie	32	0	2	0	13 (Note: Appearances in UEFA Europa League)	0	1 (Note: Appearance in European play-offs)	0	48	0
Utrecht	Total		53	0	5	0	13	0	1	0	72	0
Career total			100	0	5	0	13	0	1	0	119	0
