= Robin van Cruijsen =

Dutch footballer (born 2006)

Personal information
- Date of birth: 20 February 2006 (age 20)
- Place of birth: Amsterdam, Netherlands
- Height: 1.70 m (5 ft 7 in)
- Position: Midfielder

Team information
- Current team: Sparta Rotterdam
- Number: 18

Youth career
- 2013–2015: Ajax
- 2015–2016: Amsterdam
- 2016–2025: Volendam

Senior career*
Years	Team	Apps	(Gls)
2025–2026	Volendam	24	(4)
2026–	Sparta Rotterdam	9	(1)
- * Club domestic league appearances and goals as of 25 October 2026

Robin van Cruijsen (Dutch: [ˈrɔbɪn vɑn ˈkrœy̯sən]; born 20 February 2006) is a Dutch professional footballer who plays as a midfielder for Eredivisie club Sparta Rotterdam.

== Club career ==
Van Cruijsen began playing for the Ajax Youth Academy aged seven, before moving to Amsterdamsche FC. In 2016, he moved to FC Volendam, where he signed his first professional contract in 2025.

On 3 October 2025, van Cruijsen was named Johan Cruyff Talent of the Month for September 2025.

On 30 July 2026, van Cruijsen moved to Sparta Rotterdam on a four-season contract.

== Career statistics ==
As of match played 28 October 2026

Appearances and goals by club, season and competition
Club	Season	League			KNVB Cup		Other		Total	
Club	Season	Division	Apps	Goals	Apps	Goals	Apps	Goals	Apps	Goals
Volendam	2025–26	Eredivisie	24	4	1	0	—		25	4
Sparta Rotterdam	2026–27	Eredivisie	9	1	1	0	—		10	1
Career total			33	5	2	0	—		35	5

== Honours ==
Individual

- Eredivisie Talent of the Month: September 2025
