= Overvecht =

Neighbourhood in Utrecht, Netherlands

The location of Overvecht in the town of Utrecht

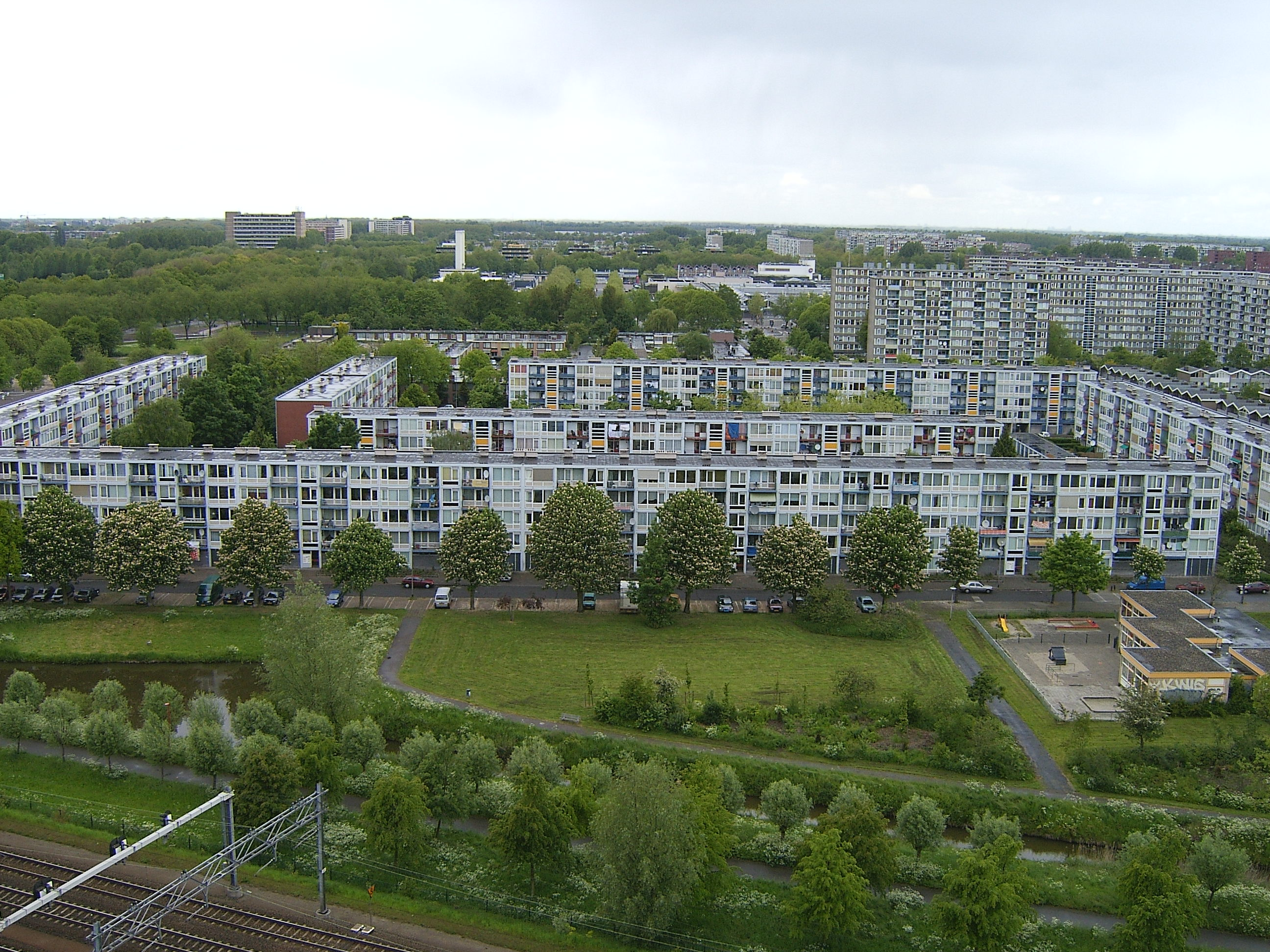
A view of Overvecht

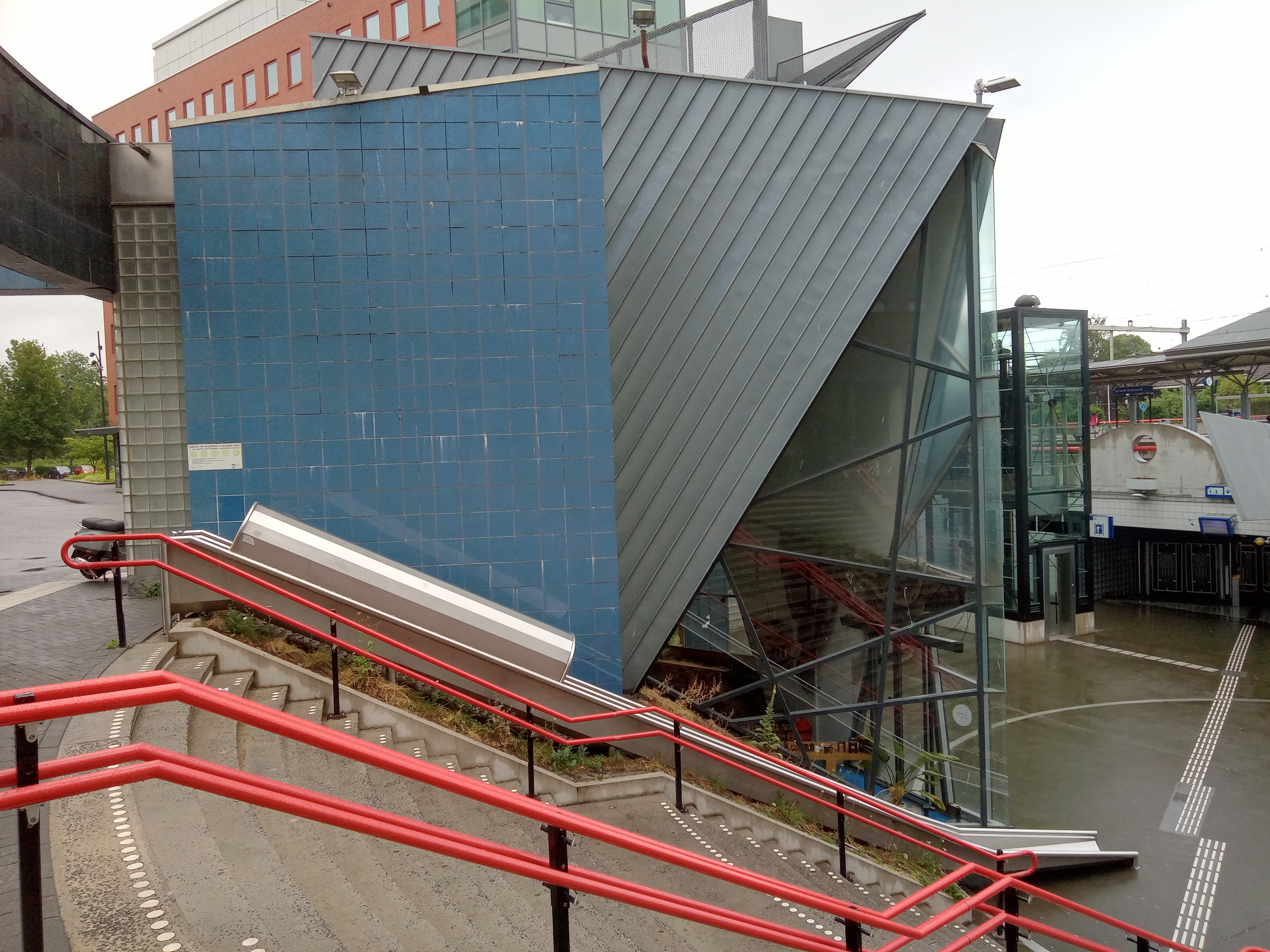
Train station Utrecht Overvecht, with the characteristic slide for travelers in a hurry

Overvecht is a district in the north of the Dutch city of Utrecht. As a post-war development, it predominantly features high-rise apartment buildings with spacious greenery in between. Overvecht offers many amenities: multiple parks, a large shopping mall, a police station, a library, train station and a neighborhood office; in terms of sports and culture, it hosts swimming pool De Kwakel, the Vechtsebanen skating rink, the large Ruigenhoek nature recreation area, and the Stefanus cultural center. Overvecht is one of Utrecht's fastest expanding districts, with the municipality reporting 35,770 inhabitants as of 1-1-2025, making it the sixth-largest district by population. Its cultural and religious demographics are varied.

Three forts belonging to the Dutch Waterline (Hollandse Waterlinie) are located at the edge of Overvecht: Fort De Gagel, Fort De Klop and Fort Blauwkapel, all of which are national monuments.

== History ==
The Municipal Reformation of 1954 led to the absorption of the Maartensdijk, Achttienhoven and Westbroek municipalities, expanding Utrecht's borders by 800 hectares and allowing for the construction of a new city district. Based on designs by urban planners Wissing and Hanekroot, development largely took place in the 1960s, with Coen de Ranitz – then secondary mayor of Utrecht – ceremonially initiating construction on 30 March 1961. Initially, the subdistricts of Overvecht-Noord and Overvecht-Zuid were built, and the majority of new construction consisted of large social housing complexes, while single-family homes were rare.

Being a new construction area, the development of Overvecht helped to alleviate the tight housing market at the time, leading to a large influx of new inhabitants. Over time, the neighborhood grew into a mature multicultural district.

In 2011, Overvecht celebrated its 50th anniversary.

As of 2012, several renovation and construction projects are underway in the district, such as Mariakwartier, Loevenhout, Bruisdreef and Wonen aan de Klop.

Brahim Abid is the district alderman for Overvecht since 23 June 2026 .

== Suburbs and neighborhoods ==
The municipality divides the district into the following subdistricts and neighborhoods:

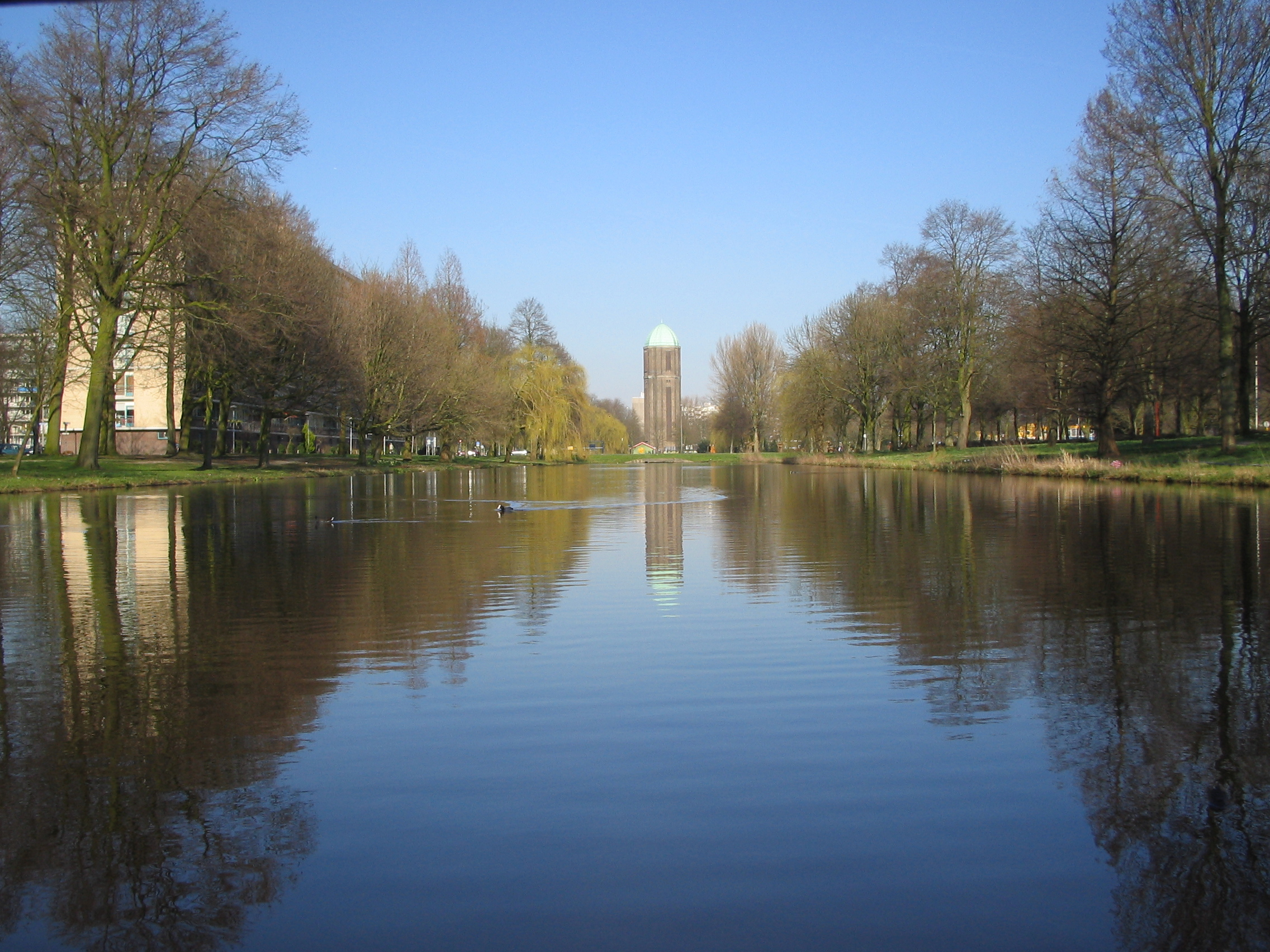
The water tower

=== Overvecht Zuid ===
- Taag and Rubicondreef and surroundings
- Zamenhofdreef and surroundings
- Wolga and Donaudreef and surroundings
- Neckardreef and surroundings
- Polder Area Overvecht

=== Overvecht Noord ===
- Zambesidreef and surroundings
- Tigris and Bostondreef and surroundings
- Business Area Nieuw Overvecht
- Amazone and Nicaraguadreef and surroundings

== Street names ==
All street names in Overvecht end in -dreef (drive). The major thoroughfares are named after famous scientists or scholars. The roads that form the crossroads between these roads are named after rivers. Some of the remaining streets have driven geographic or history names. Overvecht Zuid roads have names of operas, literature, names of Greek and Roman mythology, and a suburb with historical names of women. In Overvecht Zuid (south of the Einsteindreef) street names have European names, in Overvecht Noord they have American names in the west side, Asian and Africans in the east side. Australia is not mentioned.

Possibly as a reference to the cultural plurality of Overvecht Noord some of the streets are named after things and cultures from North Africa, such as Berberdreef which is a reference to the large numbers of Moroccans especially ones from the Rif region which has a large number of Amazigh, also known as Berber, peoples.
