= 2024–25 Jong FC Utrecht season =

Jong FC Utrecht
2024–25 season
- Owner: Frans van Seumeren Holding B.V. (99%); Stichting Continuïteit FC Utrecht (1%) overige aandeelhouders (41%)
- Chairman: Steef Klop
- Head coach: Ivar van Dinteren
- Stadium: Sportcomplex Zoudenbalch; Stadion Galgenwaard
- Keuken Kampioen Divisie: 19th
- Top goalscorer: League: Rafik El Arguioui; Georgios Charalampoglou (both 5); All: Rafik El Arguioui; Georgios Charalampoglou (both 5)
- Highest home attendance: 1,234 (vs. FC Volendam, 28 April 2025, Keuken Kampioen Divisie)
- Lowest home attendance: 236 (vs. Jong AZ, 22 October 2024, Keuken Kampioen Divisie)
- Average home league attendance: 454
- Biggest win: 3–1 (vs. Helmond Sport, 20 December 2024, Keuken Kampioen Divisie)
- Biggest defeat: 6–0 (vs. Telstar, 9 February 2025, Keuken Kampioen Divisie)
Home colours

The 2024–25 season was the 9th season of Jong FC Utrecht at the second level of Dutch football. Before that, they played in the Beloften Eredivisie.

== Players ==
=== U23-team squad ===
As of 25 March 2025

Note: Flags indicate national team as defined under FIFA eligibility rules; some limited exceptions apply. Players may hold more than one non-FIFA nationality.

No.	Pos.	Nation	Player
—	GK	MAR	Ahmed Azmi
—	GK	DEN	Andreas Dithmer
—	GK	NED	Mees Eppink
—	GK	NED	Justin Eversen
—	GK	NED	Kevin Gadellaa
—	GK	NED	Tom de Graaff
—	GK	NED	Luca Neu
—	GK	NED	Laolu Oladipo
—	DF	NED	Achraf Boumenjal
—	DF	NED	Michel Driezen
—	DF	NED	Massien Ghaddari
—	DF	NED	~~Björn Hardley~~ (Note: Left during the season.)
—	DF	USA	Rickson van Hees
—	DF	CUW	Nazjir Held
—	DF	NED	Per Kloosterboer
—	DF	NED	Wessel Kooy
—	DF	NED	Joshua Mukeh
—	DF	NED	Jesper van Riel
—	DF	NED	Neal Viereck
—	MF	USA	Paxten Aaronson (on loan from Eintracht Frankfurt)
—	MF	NED	Oualid Agougil
—	MF	DEN	~~Silas Andersen~~

No.	Pos.	Nation	Player
—	MF	NED	Rafik El Arguioui
—	MF	NED	~~Nordin Bukala~~
—	MF	FRA	Sofiane Dris
—	MF	NED	Noa Dundas
—	MF	BEL	Alonzo Engwanda
—	MF	DEN	Oscar Fraulo (on loan from Borussia Mönchengladbach)
—	MF	IDN	Ivar Jenner
—	MF	NED	Jaygo van Ommeren
—	MF	NED	Sil van der Wegen
—	MF	NED	Gibson Yah
—	FW	NED	Mees Akkerman
—	FW	ENG	Adrian Blake
—	FW	NED	Tijn den Boggende
—	FW	GRE	Georgios Charalampoglou
—	FW	BEL	Anthony Descotte (on loan from RSC Charleroi)
—	FW	NED	Lynden Edhart
—	FW	NED	Miliano Jonathans
—	FW	NED	Björn Menzo
—	FW	NED	Noah Ohio
—	FW	ESP	Miguel Rodríguez (on loan from Celta de Vigo)
—	FW	DEN	~~Emil Rohd Schlichting~~
—	FW	EST	Tony Varjund (on loan from FC Flora Tallinn)

== Transfers ==
=== Summer ===
==== Transfers in ====
Nat.	Pos.	Player	Transferred from	Particularities	Ref.
(Greece) GRE	FW	Georgios Charalampoglou	(Greece) Olympiacos B	Purchased	
(France) FRA	MF	Sofiane Dris	(Portugal) SL Benfica U23	Purchased	
(Denmark) DEN	GK	Andreas Dithmer	(Denmark) FC Copenhagen	Buy option lifted	
(Morocco) MAR	GK	Ahmed Azmi	(Netherlands) ADO Den Haag U21	Transfer free	
(Netherlands) NED	MF	Noa Dundas	(Switzerland) FC Basel U21	Transfer free	
(Netherlands) NED	DF	Jesper van Riel	(Netherlands) De Graafschap	Transfer free	
(Netherlands) NED	FW	Tijn den Boggende	(Netherlands) FC Utrecht U18	Internal transfer	
(Netherlands) NED	GK	Mees Eppink	(Netherlands) FC Utrecht U18	Internal transfer	
(Netherlands) NED	DF	Massien Ghaddari	(Netherlands) FC Utrecht U18	Internal transfer	
(Australia) AUS	DF	Joshua Rawlins	(Australia) Perth Glory	Back from loan	

==== Transfers out ====
Nat.	Pos.	Player	Transferred to	Particularities	Ref.
(Denmark) DEN	FW	Tobias Augustinus-Jensen	(Denmark) FC Helsingør	Sold	
(Netherlands) NED	DF	Björn Hardley	(Austria) TSV Hartberg	Sold	
(Netherlands) NED	MF	Nordin Bukala	(Netherlands) FC Volendam	Transfer free	
(Netherlands) NED	MF	Olivier van Eldik	(Netherlands) Jong Almere City FC	Transfer free	
(Netherlands) NED	GK	Sep van der Heijden	(Netherlands) Vitesse	Transfer free	
(Netherlands) NED	DF	Yannick Leliendal	(Netherlands) FC Volendam	Transfer free	
(Netherlands) NED	GK	Devin Remie	(Netherlands) Jong Sparta Rotterdam	Transfer free	
(Netherlands) NED	FW	Aurelio Oehlers	(Netherlands) FC Volendam	Transfer free	
(Australia) AUS	DF	Joshua Rawlins	(Australia) Melbourne Victory	Contract terminated	
(England) ENG	FW	Adrian Blake	(Netherlands) FC Utrecht	Internal transfer	
(Denmark) DEN	MF	Silas Andersen	(Netherlands) FC Utrecht	Internal transfer	
(Netherlands) NED	GK	Kevin Gadellaa	(Netherlands) FC Utrecht	Internal transfer	
(Netherlands) NED	DF	Joshua Mukeh	(Netherlands) FC Utrecht	Internal transfer	
(Netherlands) NED	FW	Jesse van de Haar	(Netherlands) De Graafschap	On loan	
(Denmark) DEN	GK	Andreas Dithmer	(Denmark) FC Copenhagen	Back from loan (+option to buy)	

=== Winter ===
==== Transfers in ====
Nat.	Pos.	Player	Transferred from	Particularities	Ref.
(Estonia) EST	FW	Tony Varjund	(Estonia) FC Flora Tallinn	On loan (+option to buy)	
(Netherlands) NED	MF	Oualid Agougil	Without club	Transfer free	

==== Transfers out ====
Nat.	Pos.	Player	Transferred to	Particularities	Ref.
(Denmark) DEN	FW	Emil Rohd Schlichting	(Norway) FK Haugesund	Sold	

== Pre-season and friendlies ==
Win Draw Loss Fixtures

29 June 2024 Friendly	Jong FC Utrecht (Netherlands)	1–2	(Germany) SV Rödinghausen	Utrecht, Netherlands
14:00 CEST (UTC+2)	Edhart	Report	Horn; Unknown (o.g.)	Stadium: Sportcomplex Zoudenbalch; Attendance: Unknown; Referee: Unknown

6 July 2024 Friendly	Jong FC Utrecht (Netherlands)	2–0	(Belgium) Beerschot	Utrecht, Netherlands
Unknown	Rohd Schlichting; Den Boggende	Report		Stadium: Sportcomplex Zoudenbalch; Attendance: Unknown; Referee: Unknown

13 July 2024 Friendly	Jong FC Utrecht (Netherlands)	3–3	(Netherlands) TOP Oss	Zeist, Netherlands
11:00 CEST (UTC+2)	Wildeboer 65' (o.g.); Akkerman 93', 98'	Report	Remans 32'; Wildeboer 58'; Loukili 60'	Stadium: KNVB Campus; Attendance: Unknown; Referee: Unknown

20 July 2024 Friendly	Jong FC Utrecht (Netherlands)	2–1	(Israel) FC Ashdod	Netherlands
Unknown	Edhart; Hardeveld	Report	Levi	Stadium: Unknown; Attendance: Unknown; Referee: Unknown

27 July 2024 Friendly	Jong FC Utrecht (Netherlands)	1–0	(Belgium) Royal Francs Borains	Scharendijke, Netherlands
15:00 CEST (UTC+2)	Charalampoglou	Report		Stadium: Sportpark ZSC '62; Attendance: 100 (±); Referee: Unknown

3 August 2024 Friendly	Go Ahead Eagles (Netherlands)	1–4	(Netherlands) Jong FC Utrecht	Netherlands
14:30 CEST (UTC+2)	Weijenberg	Report	El Arguioui; Den Boggende; Akkerman,	Stadium: Unknown; Attendance: Unknown; Referee: Unknown

3 September 2024 Friendly	Jong FC Utrecht (Netherlands)	0–3	(Netherlands) PEC Zwolle	Utrecht, Netherlands
Unknown		Report	Mbayo; El Morabit; De Rooij	Stadium: Sportcomplex Zoudenbalch; Attendance: Unknown; Referee: Unknown

7 October 2024 Friendly	Fortuna Sittard (Netherlands)	1–0	(Netherlands) Jong FC Utrecht	Kelpen-Oler, Netherlands
Unknown	Unknown	Report		Stadium: Unknown; Attendance: Unknown; Referee: Unknown

== Competition ==
=== Overall record ===
Competition	First match	Last match	Starting round	Final position	Record							
Competition	First match	Last match	Starting round	Final position	Pld	W	D	L	GF	GA	GD	Win %
Keuken Kampioen Divisie	9 August 2024	9 May 2025	Matchday 1	19th	38	4	11	23	31	82	−51	10.53
Total					38	4	11	23	31	82	−51	10.53

Last updated: 12 May 2025
Source: Soccerway

=== Keuken Kampioen Divisie ===
==== League table ====
Pos	Team	Pld	W	D	L	GF	GA	GD	Pts	Promotion or qualification
16	TOP Oss	38	8	14	16	31	60	−29	38	
17	Jong Ajax	38	9	9	20	37	52	−15	36	Reserve teams are not eligible to be promoted to the Eredivisie
18	Jong PSV	38	8	6	24	55	86	−31	30	Reserve teams are not eligible to be promoted to the Eredivisie
19	Jong FC Utrecht	38	4	11	23	31	82	−51	23	Reserve teams are not eligible to be promoted to the Eredivisie
20	Vitesse (Note: Vitesse were deducted six points for breaking the license requirements set by the Royal Dutch Football Association in September 2024, and were deducted another twenty-one points in November 2024 for multiple violations. In April 2025, Vitesse were deducted three points for withholding information. Later in April 2025, Vitesse was once again deducted three points due to late submission of required documentation, and another six points due to previous administrative shortcomings. These six points were drawn up in September 2024 as a conditional sanction, but were subsequently put into effect due to failure to comply with the set conditions. Vitesse appealed the decisions of the deductions of the final 12 points, and due to the decision of the rejection of the appeal coming after the end of the season, the penalty was instead moved to next season.)	38	11	11	16	54	73	−19	17	

Source: Flashscore, Keuken Kampioen Divisie (in Dutch)
Rules for classification: Season in progress: 1) Most points won; 2) Less points lost; 3) Goal difference; 4) Goals scored; 5) Alphabetical order; End of season: 1) Points; 2) Goal difference; 3) Goals scored; 4) Head-to-head points; 5) Head-to-head goal difference; 6) Head-to-head away goals scored; 7) Play-off if relevant for deciding champion, relegation or participating in a European league, otherwise by draw. 8) Penalty shoot-out (only after a play-off)

==== Results summary ====
Overall								Home						Away					
Pld	W	D	L	GF	GA	GD	Pts	W	D	L	GF	GA	GD	W	D	L	GF	GA	GD
38	4	11	23	31	82	−51	23	3	6	10	17	34	−17	1	5	13	14	48	−34

Last updated: 12 May 2025.
Source: Eerste divisie

==== Results by round ====
Round	1	2	3	4	5	6	7	8	9	10	11	12	13	14	15	16	17	18	19	20	21	22	23	24	25	26	27	28	29	30	31	32	33	34	35	36	37	38
Ground	A	H	A	H	H	A	H	A	H	H	A	A	H	A	H	H	A	H	A	H	A	H	A	H	A	H	A	H	A	A	H	A	H	A	A	H	H	A
Result	D	L	D	L	L	L	L	D	D	L	D	L	W	L	D	L	D	L	L	W	L	D	L	L	L	D	W	D	L	L	L	L	D	L	L	L	W	L
Position	12	17	17	17	18	19	19	19	19	19	19	19	19	19	19	19	19	19	19	19	19	19	19	19	19	19	19	19	19	19	19	19	19	19	19	19	19	19

Updated to match(es) played on 12 May 2025. Source: Eerste divisie
A = Away; H = Home; W = Win; D = Draw; L = Loss

==== Matches ====
The league fixtures were announced on 24 June 2024.

9 August 2024 1	Helmond Sport	1–1	Jong FC Utrecht	Helmond
20:00 CEST (UTC+2)	Van den Hurk 25'; Absalem (yellow card) 87'; Šits (yellow card) 90'	Report	El Arguioui 8'; Den Boggende (yellow card) 55'	Stadium: GS Staalwerken Stadion; Attendance: 1,833; Referee: Kevin Puts

16 August 2024 2	Jong FC Utrecht	0–2	Jong PSV	Utrecht
20:00 CEST (UTC+2)	El Arguioui (yellow card) 29'	Report	Abed 4'; Bawuah 51'; Kuhn (yellow card) 67'	Stadium: Sportcomplex Zoudenbalch; Attendance: 419; Referee: Thomas Hardeman

23 August 2024 3	De Graafschap	2–2	Jong FC Utrecht	Doetinchem
20:00 CEST (UTC+2)	Bisselink 43'; Hardeman (yellow card) 56'; Mahi 81' (pen.)	Report	Rohd Schlichting 66'; Descotte 68', (yellow card) 68'	Stadium: Stadion De Vijverberg; Attendance: 7,000; Referee: Luuk Timmer

30 August 2024 4	Jong FC Utrecht	1–2	FC Emmen	Utrecht
20:00 CEST (UTC+2)	Andersen 37'; Van Hees (yellow card) 71'	Report	Rhein (yellow card) 22'; Mulder (yellow card) 50'; Te Wierik 53'; Hawkins 72' (pen.); Evina (yellow card) 90+2'; Unbehaun (yellow card) 90+5'	Stadium: Sportcomplex Zoudenbalch; Attendance: 431; Referee: Martin Pérez

13 September 2024 6	VVV-Venlo	3–2	Jong FC Utrecht	Venlo
20:00 CEST (UTC+2)	Doumtsios 5', (yellow card) 50'; De Waal (yellow card) 35'; Gyamfi (yellow card) 61'; Doesburg 70', 76'	Report	Blake 40', (yellow card) 45'; El Arguioui 49'	Stadium: Covebo Stadion - De Koel; Attendance: 4,949; Referee: Rick Sturm

16 September 2024 5	Jong FC Utrecht	0–3	FC Den Bosch	Utrecht
20:00 CEST (UTC+2)	Charalampoglou (penalty missed) 54'; Van der Wegen (yellow card) 59'	Report	Gravenberch 12'; Kooy 29' (o.g.); Burgering 51'; Van den Bogert (yellow card) 90+3'	Stadium: Sportcomplex Zoudenbalch; Attendance: 431; Referee: Robin Vereijken

23 September 2024 7	Jong FC Utrecht	0–4	SC Cambuur	Utrecht
20:00 CEST (UTC+2)	Ghaddari (red card) 29'	Report	Afolabi 30' (pen.); Mercera 53', 82'; De Jong 72'	Stadium: Stadion Galgenwaard; Attendance: 522; Referee: Stan Teuben

27 September 2024 8	ADO Den Haag	1–1	Jong FC Utrecht	The Hague
20:00 CEST (UTC+2)	Bonis 11'; Kilo (yellow card) 64'	Report	Van Hees (yellow card) 27'; El Arguioui 30', (yellow card) 87'; Dundas (yellow card) 48'; Blake (yellow card) 53'	Stadium: Bingoal Stadion; Attendance: 6,187; Referee: Wouter Wiersma

4 October 2024 9	Jong FC Utrecht	1–1	Telstar	Utrecht
20:00 CEST (UTC+2)	Mukeh (yellow card) 75'; Akkerman (yellow card) 86'; Van der Wegen 90+5'	Report	Turfkruier (yellow card) 26'; Eddahchouri 27'; El Kachati (yellow card) 42'; Koswal (yellow card) 45'; Hetli (yellow card) 86'	Stadium: Sportcomplex Zoudenbalch; Attendance: 418; Referee: Thomas Hardeman

18 October 2024 11	Jong Ajax	0–0	Jong FC Utrecht	Duivendrecht
20:00 CEST (UTC+2)	Chourak (yellow card) 45+1'; Mokio (yellow card) 45+3'; Verschuren (yellow card) 90'	Report	Blake (yellow card) 40'; Akkerman (yellow card) 57'; Mukeh (yellow card) 86'	Stadium: Sportcomplex de Toekomst; Attendance: 573; Referee: Rick Sturm

22 October 2024 10	Jong FC Utrecht	0–1	Jong AZ	Utrecht
20:00 CEST (UTC+2)	Viereck (yellow card) 66'	Report	Dijkstra 9'	Stadium: Sportcomplex Zoudenbalch; Attendance: 236; Referee: Luuk Timmer

25 October 2024 12	FC Dordrecht	3–1	Jong FC Utrecht	Dordrecht
20:00 CEST (UTC+2)	Slory 37'; Mukeh 46' (o.g.); Shein 58'	Report	Akkerman (yellow card) 68'; Edhart 84' (pen.)	Stadium: M-Scores Stadion; Attendance: 2,220; Referee: Laurens Gerrets

4 November 2024 13	Jong FC Utrecht	4–3	MVV Maastricht	Utrecht
20:00 CET (UTC+1)	Andersen 28'; Blake 30'; Edhart 76'; Mukeh 90+6', (yellow card) 90+7'	Report	Buifrahi 47'; Librici 63'; Braken 71', (yellow card) 90+3'; Zeegers (yellow card) 81'; Penders (yellow card) 90+5'	Stadium: Sportcomplex Zoudenbalch; Attendance: 380; Referee: Stan Teuben

8 November 2024 14	FC Volendam	2–0	Jong FC Utrecht	Volendam
20:00 CET (UTC+1)	Mühren (yellow card) 45'; Ould-Chikh 72'; Leliendal (yellow card) 79'; Veerman 85'	Report	El Arguioui (red card) 30'; Mukeh (yellow card) 45'; Van Hees (yellow card) 55'; Held (yellow card) 69' (yellow-red card) 82'	Stadium: Kras Stadion; Attendance: 5,508; Referee: Kevin Puts

22 November 2024 16	Jong FC Utrecht	1–3	Roda JC Kerkrade	Utrecht
20:00 CET (UTC+1)	Van der Wegen 32'; Andersen (red card) 64'	Report	Oude Kotte 63' (pen.), 89' (pen.); Seedorf 86'	Stadium: Sportcomplex Zoudenbalch; Attendance: 420; Referee: Clay Ruperti

26 November 2024 15	Jong FC Utrecht	0–0	Excelsior	Utrecht
20:00 CET (UTC+1)	Van Hees (yellow card) 42'; Dundas (yellow card) 87'	Report	Hartjes (yellow card) 32'; Raatsie (yellow card) 45+1'; Fini (yellow card) 46'	Stadium: Sportcomplex Zoudenbalch; Attendance: 495; Referee: Wouter Wiersma

30 November 2024 17	TOP Oss	1–1	Jong FC Utrecht	Oss
16:30 CET (UTC+1)	Driezen 25' (o.g.)	Report	Dundas 88'	Stadium: Frans Heesen Stadion; Attendance: 1,708; Referee: Rick Sturm

9 December 2024 18	Jong FC Utrecht	0–4	FC Eindhoven	Utrecht
20:00 CET (UTC+1)	Viereck (yellow card) 39'; Mukeh (yellow card) 62'	Report	Huisman 16', (yellow card) 23'; El Bouchataoui 35', (yellow card) 40'; Rottier 75'; Blummel 78'	Stadium: Sportcomplex Zoudenbalch; Attendance: 281; Referee: Robin Vereijken

13 December 2024 19	Vitesse	2–1	Jong FC Utrecht	Arnhem
20:00 CET (UTC+1)	Jonathans 56'; Yegoian 60'	Report	Jenner (yellow card) 76'; Charalampoglou 90+3'	Stadium: GelreDome; Attendance: 15,065; Referee: Stan Teuben

20 December 2024 20	Jong FC Utrecht	3–1	Helmond Sport	Utrecht
20:00 CET (UTC+1)	Dundas (yellow card) 8'; El Arguioui (yellow card) 35', (goal) 54' (pen.); Charalampoglou 38', 68'	Report	Zimuangana 33'; Aben (yellow card) 51'; Absalem (yellow card) 56'; Van Hove (yellow card) 72'	Stadium: Sportcomplex Zoudenbalch; Attendance: 341; Referee: Thomas Hardeman

20 January 2025 22	Jong FC Utrecht	1–1	De Graafschap	Utrecht
20:00 CET (UTC+1)	Blake 41'; Andersen (yellow card) 64'; Boumenjal (yellow card) 90+4'	Report	Besselink (yellow card) 66'; Hassan 86'	Stadium: Sportcomplex Zoudenbalch; Attendance: 311; Referee: Martin Pérez

24 January 2025 23	Roda JC Kerkrade	3–0	Jong FC Utrecht	Kerkrade
20:00 CET (UTC+1)	Çukur 3'; Seedorf 48', 52'; Džepar (yellow card) 54'; Koglin (yellow card) 68'	Report		Stadium: Parkstad Limburg Stadion; Attendance: 6,371; Referee: Alex Bos

27 January 2025 21	FC Den Bosch	2–0	Jong FC Utrecht	's-Hertogenbosch
20:00 CET (UTC+1)	Karlsson Grach 2'; Van Grunsven 43'	Report	Menzo (yellow card) 33'; Akkerman (yellow card) 68'; Jenner (yellow card) 73'; Dundas (yellow card) 82'	Stadium: Stadion De Vliert; Attendance: 3,773; Referee: Stan Teuben

9 February 2025 25	Telstar	6–0	Jong FC Utrecht	Velsen-Zuid
16:45 CET (UTC+1)	Hardeveld 4', (yellow card) 45+1'; Bakker 21'; Hetli 71'; El Kachati 79', 88'; Van Ekeris (yellow card) 90'; Overtoom 90+3'	Report	Edhart (yellow card) 31'; Charalampoglou (yellow card) 55'; Held (yellow card) 69'	Stadium: 711 Stadion; Attendance: 1,816; Referee: Luuk Timmer

23 February 2025 27	FC Eindhoven	1–2	Jong FC Utrecht	Eindhoven
12:15 CET (UTC+1)	Janga 3'; Persyn (yellow card) 62'	Report	Held (yellow card) 50'; Charalampoglou 69'; El Arguioui 90+3', (yellow card) 90+4'	Stadium: Jan Louwers Stadion; Attendance: 2,288; Referee: Kevin Puts

28 February 2025 24	Jong FC Utrecht	1–2	Jong Ajax	Utrecht
20:00 CET (UTC+1)	Jenner (yellow card) 41' (yellow-red card) 53'; Akkerman 89'	Report	Brandes 19'; Bounida 42'	Stadium: Sportcomplex Zoudenbalch; Attendance: 334; Referee: Robin Vereijken

3 March 2025 28	Jong FC Utrecht	1–1	TOP Oss	Utrecht
20:00 CET (UTC+1)	Kooy (yellow card) 58'; Van der Wegen 65'	Report	Vianello (yellow card) 28'; Zimmerman 33', (yellow card) 37'; Lambrix (yellow card) 39'; Van Rooijen (yellow card) 72'; Slagveer (yellow card) 90+2'	Stadium: Sportcomplex Zoudenbalch; Attendance: 268; Referee: Laurens Gerrets

7 March 2025 29	Jong AZ	5–1	Jong FC Utrecht	Wijdewormer
20:00 CET (UTC+1)	Van Duijn 27'; Verhulst (yellow card) 64'; Smit 68', 77', 80'; Daal 85'	Report	Charalampoglou 11'; Kloosterboer (yellow card) 90+1'	Stadium: AFAS Trainingscomplex; Attendance: 452; Referee: Rick Sturm

10 March 2025 31	Jong FC Utrecht	0–2	Vitesse	Utrecht
20:00 CEST (UTC+2)	Gadellaa (red card) 39'	Report	De Regt 3'; Büttner 13' (pen.); Koller (yellow card) 62'	Stadium: Stadion Galgenwaard; Attendance: 711; Referee: Wouter Wiersma

14 March 2025 30	FC Emmen	2–0	Jong FC Utrecht	Emmen
20:00 CET (UTC+1)	Nsona 7', 90+2'; Martin (yellow card) 77'	Report	Yah (yellow card) 5'; Viereck (yellow card) 46'; Van der Wegen (yellow card) 81'; Ghaddari (yellow card) 86'	Stadium: De Oude Meerdijk; Attendance: 7,336; Referee: Thomas Hardeman

28 March 2025 32	Excelsior	3–0	Jong FC Utrecht	Emmen
20:00 CET (UTC+1)	Hatenboer (yellow card) 24'; Sanches Fernandes 41'; Duijvestijn 47', 74'	Report		Stadium: Van Donge & De Roo Stadion; Attendance: 3,373; Referee: Laurens Gerrets

1 April 2025 26	Jong FC Utrecht	0–0	VVV-Venlo	Utrecht
20:00 CEST (UTC+2)		Report	Wehmeyer (yellow card) 67'	Stadium: Sportcomplex Zoudenbalch; Attendance: 334; Referee: Robin Vereijken

7 April 2025 33	Jong FC Utrecht	1–1	ADO Den Haag	Utrecht
20:00 CEST (UTC+2)	Akkerman (yellow card) 35'; Ohio 41' (pen.); Yah (yellow card) 49'; Dundas (red card) 72'; Jonathans (yellow card) 83'	Report	Waem (yellow card) 50'; Schalk 58'; Sürmeli (red card) 72'	Stadium: Stadion Galgenwaard; Attendance: 752; Referee: Martijn Vos

13 April 2025 34	SC Cambuur	3–1	Jong FC Utrecht	Leeuwarden
12:15 CEST (UTC+2)	Nieling (yellow card) 22'; Diemers 41', 56' (pen.); Alhaft 48'	Report	Ghaddari 3'; Viereck (yellow card) 55'; Boumenjal (yellow card) 68'	Stadium: Kooi Stadion; Attendance: 14,118; Referee: Kevin Puts

18 April 2025 35	MVV Maastricht	5–0	Jong FC Utrecht	Maastricht
20:00 CEST (UTC+2)	Braken 3', 26', 76'; Kleinen 23'; El Basri 90'	Report	Edhart (yellow card) 40'	Stadium: De Geusselt; Attendance: 3,000; Referee: Rick Sturm

28 April 2025 36	Jong FC Utrecht	2–3	FC Volendam	Utrecht
20:00 CEST (UTC+2)	Edhart 36'; Ghaddari 42'; Agougil (yellow card) 85'	Report	Veerman 32', 54', 65'; Kuwas (yellow card) 50'	Stadium: Stadion Galgenwaard; Attendance: 1,234; Referee: Wouter Wiersma

2 May 2025 37	Jong FC Utrecht	1–0	FC Dordrecht	Utrecht
20:00 CEST (UTC+2)	Ohio 58'; Agougil (yellow card) 79'; Dundas (yellow card) 87'; Jenner (yellow card) 90+4'	Report	Parlanti (yellow card) 16'; Seydoux (yellow card) 69'; M'Bemba (yellow card) 74'	Stadium: Sportcomplex Zoudenbalch; Attendance: 302; Referee: Martin Perez

9 May 2025 38	Jong PSV	3–1	Jong FC Utrecht	Eindhoven
20:00 CEST (UTC+2)	Uneken 10' (pen.); Gilbert 35', (yellow card) 70'; Houben (penalty missed) 74'; Younis (yellow card) 75', (goal) 82' (pen.)	Report	Van Riel 66'; Agougil (yellow card) 73'	Stadium: PSV Campus De Herdgang; Attendance: 639; Referee: Kevin Puts

== Statistics ==
=== Goalscorers ===
Friendlies

No.	Name	Goal
1.	(Netherlands) Mees Akkerman	4
2.	(Netherlands) Tijn den Boggende	2
2.	(Netherlands) Lynden Edhart	2
4.	(Netherlands) Rafik El Arguioui	1
4.	(Greece) Georgios Charalampoglou	1
4.	(Netherlands) Jeff Hardeveld	1
4.	(Denmark) Emil Rohd Schlichting	1
Own goals opponent		1
Totals		13

(Netherlands) Keuken Kampioen Divisie

No.	Name	Goal
1.	(Netherlands) Rafik El Arguioui	5
1.	(Greece) Georgios Charalampoglou	5
3.	(England) Adrian Blake	3
3.	(Netherlands) Lynden Edhart	3
3.	(Netherlands) Sil van der Wegen	3
6.	(Denmark) Silas Andersen	2
6.	(Netherlands) Massien Ghaddari	2
6.	(Netherlands) Noah Ohio	2
9.	(Netherlands) Mees Akkerman	1
9.	(Belgium) Anthony Descotte	1
9.	(Netherlands) Noa Dundas	1
9.	(Netherlands) Joshua Mukeh	1
9.	(Netherlands) Jesper van Riel	1
9.	(Denmark) Emil Rohd Schlichting	1
Own goals opponent		-
Totals		31

=== Assists ===
(Netherlands) Keuken Kampioen Divisie

No.	Name	
1.	(Netherlands) Tijn den Boggende	3
2.	(Netherlands) Mees Akkerman	2
2.	(Netherlands) Lynden Edhart	2
2.	(Denmark) Emil Rohd Schlichting	2
2.	(Netherlands) Sil van der Wegen	2
6.	(Denmark) Silas Andersen	1
6.	(Greece) Georgios Charalampoglou	1
6.	(France) Sofiane Dris	1
6.	(Netherlands) Massien Ghaddari	1
6.	(Curaçao) Nazjir Held	1
6.	(Netherlands) Jesper van Riel	1
6.	(Netherlands) Gibson Yah	1
Totals		18

== Attendance Stadion Galgenwaard ==
Round	Opponent	Attendance	Total attendance	Average
Keuken Kampioen Divisie
7	SC Cambuur	522	522	522
31	Vitesse	711	1,233	617
33	ADO Den Haag	752	1,985	662
36	FC Volendam	1,234	3,219	805

== Attendance Sportcomplex Zoudenbalch ==
Round	Opponent	Attendance	Total attendance	Average
Keuken Kampioen Divisie
2	Jong PSV	419	419	419
4	FC Emmen	431	850	425
5	FC Den Bosch	431	1,281	427
9	Telstar	418	1,699	425
10	Jong AZ	236	1,935	387
13	MVV Maastricht	380	2,315	386
16	Roda JC Kerkrade	420	2,735	391
15	Excelsior	495	3,230	404
18	FC Eindhoven	281	3,511	390
20	Helmond Sport	341	3,852	385
22	De Graafschap	311	4,163	378
24	Jong Ajax	334	4,497	375
28	TOP Oss	268	4,765	367
26	VVV-Venlo	334	5,099	364
37	FC Dordrecht	302	5,401	360
