= 2023–24 Jong FC Utrecht season =

Jong FC Utrecht
2023–24 season
- Owner: Frans van Seumeren Holding B.V. (99%); Stichting Continuïteit FC Utrecht (1%) overige aandeelhouders (41%)
- Chairman: Steef Klop
- Head coach: Ivar van Dinteren
- Stadium: Sportcomplex Zoudenbalch; Stadion Galgenwaard
- Keuken Kampioen Divisie: 20th
- Top goalscorer: League: Jesse van de Haar (6); All: Jesse van de Haar (6)
- Highest home attendance: 1,030 (vs. FC Groningen, 21 August 2023)
- Lowest home attendance: 253 (vs. MVV Maastricht, 30 October 2023)
- Average home league attendance: 470
- Biggest win: 2–4 (vs. SC Cambuur, 16 February 2024)
- Biggest defeat: 6–0 (vs. ADO Den Haag, 27 November 2023)

The 2023–24 season was the 8th season of Jong FC Utrecht at the second level of Dutch football. Before that, they played in the Beloften Eredivisie.

== Players ==
=== U23-team squad ===
As of 23 April 2024

Note: Flags indicate national team as defined under FIFA eligibility rules; some limited exceptions apply. Players may hold more than one non-FIFA nationality.

No.	Pos.	Nation	Player
—	GK	NED	Mattijs Branderhorst
—	GK	DEN	Andreas Dithmer (on loan from FC Copenhagen)
—	GK	NED	Mees Eppink
—	GK	NED	Kevin Gadellaa
—	GK	NED	Sep van der Heijden
—	GK	NED	Thijmen Nijhuis
—	GK	NED	~~Calvin Raatsie~~ (Note: Left during the season.)
—	GK	NED	Devin Remie
—	DF	NED	Achraf Boumenjal
—	DF	NED	Michel Driezen
—	DF	NED	Massien Ghaddari
—	DF	NED	Björn Hardley
—	DF	USA	Rickson van Hees
—	DF	CUW	Nazjir Held
—	DF	NED	Per Kloosterboer
—	DF	NED	Wessel Kooy
—	DF	NED	Yannick Leliendal
—	DF	NED	Joshua Mukeh (captain)
—	DF	AUS	~~Joshua Rawlins~~
—	DF	NED	~~Jozhua Vertrouwd~~

No.	Pos.	Nation	Player
—	DF	NED	Neal Viereck
—	MF	DEN	Silas Andersen
—	MF	NED	Nordin Bukala
—	MF	NED	Lynden Edhart
—	MF	NED	Rafik El Arguioui
—	MF	NED	Olivier van Eldik
—	MF	IRQ	Zidane Iqbal
—	MF	IDN	Ivar Jenner
—	MF	NED	Sil van der Wegen
—	MF	NED	Gibson Yah
—	FW	NED	Mees Akkerman
—	FW	DEN	Tobias Augustinus-Jensen
—	FW	ENG	Adrian Blake
—	FW	NED	Tijn den Boggende
—	FW	BEL	Anthony Descotte
—	FW	NED	Jesse van de Haar
—	FW	NED	Aurelio Oehlers
—	FW	NED	~~Mees Rijks~~
—	FW	DEN	Emil Rohd Schlichting

== Transfers ==
=== Summer ===
==== Transfers in ====
Nat.	Pos.	Player	Transferred from	Particularities	Ref.
(Denmark) DEN	MF	Silas Andersen	(Italy) Inter U19	Purchased	
(Denmark) DEN	FW	Emil Rohd Schlichting	(Denmark) FC Kopenhagen U19	Purchased	
(Netherlands) NED	DF	Björn Hardley	(England) Manchester United U21	Transfer free	
(United States) USA	DF	Rickson van Hees	(Netherlands) FC Twente/Heracles U21	Transfer free	
(Netherlands) NED	GK	Devin Remie	(Netherlands) Feyenoord U21	Transfer free	
(Netherlands) NED	DF	Neal Viereck	(Netherlands) Ajax U18	Transfer free	
(Netherlands) NED	FW	Mees Akkerman	(Netherlands) FC Utrecht U18	Internal transfer	
(Netherlands) NED	MF	Nordin Bukala	(Netherlands) FC Utrecht U18	Internal transfer	
(Netherlands) NED	MF	Rafik El Arguioui	(Netherlands) FC Utrecht U18	Internal transfer	
(Netherlands) NED	FW	Jesse van de Haar	(Netherlands) FC Utrecht U18	Internal transfer	
(Curaçao) CUW	DF	Nazjir Held	(Netherlands) FC Utrecht U18	Internal transfer	
(Netherlands) NED	DF	Per Kloosterboer	(Netherlands) FC Utrecht U18	Internal transfer	
(Netherlands) NED	DF	Wessel Kooy	(Netherlands) FC Utrecht U18	Internal transfer	
(Netherlands) NED	MF	Sil van der Wegen	(Netherlands) FC Utrecht U18	Internal transfer	
(Morocco) MAR	FW	Mohamed Akharaz	(Netherlands) ADO Den Haag U21	Back from loan	
(Netherlands) NED	FW	Mohamed Mallahi	(Netherlands) Roda JC Kerkrade	Back from loan	
(Netherlands) NED	DF	Joshua Mukeh	(Netherlands) TOP Oss	Back from loan	

==== Transfers out ====
Nat.	Pos.	Player	Transferred to	Particularities	Ref.
(Netherlands) NED	FW	Mohamed Mallahi	(Netherlands) Helmond Sport	Sold	
(Netherlands) NED	DF	Christopher Mamengi	(Netherlands) Almere City FC	Sold	
(Netherlands) NED	FW	Derensili Sanches Fernandes	(Netherlands) Excelsior Rotterdam	Sold	
(Netherlands) NED	DF	Jozhua Vertrouwd	(Spain) CD Castellón	Sold	
(Netherlands) NED	DF	Reda Akmum	Without club	Transfer free	
(Netherlands) NED	DF	Julliani Eersteling	(Cyprus) AO Agia Napa	Transfer free	
(Netherlands) NED	MF	Yuya Ikeshita	(Netherlands) FC Den Bosch	Transfer free	
(Netherlands) NED	GK	Jordy Steins	(Netherlands) Roda JC Kerkrade	Transfer free	
(Curaçao) CUW	DF	Dylan Timber	(Netherlands) VVV-Venlo	Transfer free	
(Netherlands) NED	FW	Dion Versluis	(Netherlands) NAC Breda U21	Transfer free	
(Curaçao) CUW	FW	Gio-Renys Felicia	Without club	Contract terminated	
(Netherlands) NED	MF	Eliano Reijnders	(Netherlands) PEC Zwolle	Back from loan (+option to buy)	

=== Winter ===
==== Transfers in ====
Nat.	Pos.	Player	Transferred from	Particularities	Ref.
(Netherlands) NED	DF	Michel Driezen	(Netherlands) FC Twente/Heracles U21	Purchased	
(Denmark) DEN	GK	Andreas Dithmer	(Denmark) FC Copenhagen	On loan (+option to buy)	

==== Transfers out ====
Nat.	Pos.	Player	Transferred to	Particularities	Ref.
(Netherlands) NED	FW	Mees Rijks	(Norway) Vålerenga IF	Sold	
(Australia) AUS	DF	Joshua Rawlins	(Australia) Perth Glory	On loan	

== Pre-season and friendlies ==
Win Draw Loss Fixtures

8 July 2023 Friendly	Jong FC Utrecht (Netherlands)	2–2	(Germany) Wuppertaler SV	Utrecht, Netherlands
14:00 CEST (UTC+2)	Mallahi 70', 76'	Report	Hagemann 10'; Marčeta 37'	Stadium: Sportcomplex Zoudenbalch; Attendance: 0 Referee: Unknown
Note: Behind closed doors.

14 July 2023 Friendly	KFC Uerdingen 05 (Germany)	2–1	(Netherlands) Jong FC Utrecht	Uerdingen, Germany
18:30 CEST (UTC+2)	Rizzo 64'; Weber 81'	Report	Oehlers 67'	Stadium: BSA Am Rundweg; Attendance: 500; Referee: Unknown

21 July 2023 Friendly	Jong FC Utrecht (Netherlands)	0–2	(Netherlands) TOP Oss	Utrecht, Netherlands
14:00 CEST (UTC+2)		Report	Hernández 58'; Gertsen 79'	Stadium: Sportcomplex Zoudenbalch; Attendance: Unknown; Referee: Unknown

28 July 2023 Friendly	SC Cambuur (Netherlands)	1–0	(Netherlands) Jong FC Utrecht	Scharendijke, Netherlands
13:00 CEST (UTC+2)	Uldriķis 7'	Report		Stadium: Sportpark ZSC ’62; Attendance: Unknown; Referee: Unknown

5 August 2023 Friendly	VV Katwijk (Netherlands)	1–1	(Netherlands) Jong FC Utrecht	Katwijk, Netherlands
12:00 CEST (UTC+2)	Kunst 45+1'	Report	Rohd Schlichting 47'	Stadium: Sportpark de Krom; Attendance: Unknown; Referee: Unknown

9 August 2023 Friendly	Jong FC Utrecht (Netherlands)	0–2	(Netherlands) Telstar	Utrecht, Netherlands
13:00 CEST (UTC+2)		Report	Eddahchouri 71'; Van den Heerik 90'	Stadium: Sportcomplex Zoudenbalch; Attendance: Unknown; Referee: Unknown

14 November 2023 Friendly	Jong FC Utrecht (Netherlands)	3–3	(Netherlands) Jong Sparta Rotterdam	Utrecht, Netherlands
13:00 CET (UTC+1)	Viereck 11'; Akkerman 69'; Blake 81'	Report	Bal 4'; Triep 52'; Oufkir 61'	Stadium: Sportcomplex Zoudenbalch; Attendance: Unknown; Referee: Unknown

8 January 2024 Friendly	Jong FC Utrecht (Netherlands)	2–3	(Netherlands) FC Den Bosch	Utrecht, Netherlands
12:00 CET (UTC+1)	Oehlers; Rijks (pen.)	Report	Kalinauskas; Kotzebue; Leijten	Stadium: Sportcomplex Zoudenbalch; Attendance: 0 Referee: Unknown
Note: Match played behind closed doors with 4 halves from 30 minutes.

== Competition ==
=== Overall record ===
Competition	First match	Last match	Starting round	Final position	Record							
Competition	First match	Last match	Starting round	Final position	Pld	W	D	L	GF	GA	GD	Win %
Keuken Kampioen Divisie	14 August 2023	10 May 2024	Matchday 1	20th	38	5	11	22	32	74	−42	13.16
Total					38	5	11	22	32	74	−42	13.16

Last updated: 13 May 2024
Source: Soccerway

=== Keuken Kampioen Divisie ===
==== League table ====
Pos	Team	Pld	W	D	L	GF	GA	GD	Pts	Promotion or qualification
16	Jong PSV	38	11	7	20	63	81	−18	40	Reserve teams are not eligible to be promoted to the Eredivisie
17	Telstar	38	9	8	21	47	68	−21	35	
18	TOP Oss	38	10	4	24	32	66	−34	34	
19	Den Bosch	38	8	9	21	38	68	−30	33	
20	Jong FC Utrecht	38	5	11	22	32	74	−42	26	Reserve teams are not eligible to be promoted to the Eredivisie

Source: Flashscore, Keuken Kampioen Divisie (in Dutch)
Rules for classification: Season in progress: 1) Most points won; 2) Less points lost; 3) Goal difference; 4) Goals scored; 5) Alphabetical order; End of season: 1) Points; 2) Goal difference; 3) Goals scored; 4) Head-to-head points; 5) Head-to-head goal difference; 6) Head-to-head away goals scored; 7) Play-off if relevant for deciding champion, relegation or participating in a European league, otherwise by draw. 8) Penalty shoot-out (only after a play-off)

===== Period 1 =====
Pos	Team	Pld	W	D	L	GF	GA	GD	Pts	Qualification
13	Jong AZ	9	3	2	4	12	14	−2	11	Reserves teams cannot participate in the promotion play-offs
14	NAC Breda	9	3	2	4	15	18	−3	11	
15	Jong FC Utrecht	9	3	2	4	10	17	−7	11	Reserves teams cannot participate in the promotion play-offs
16	MVV Maastricht	9	3	1	5	14	17	−3	10	
17	Den Bosch	9	3	0	6	11	15	−4	9	

Source: Keuken Kampioen Divisie (in Dutch)
Rules for classification: 1) points; 2) goal difference; 3) number of goals scored

===== Period 2 =====
Pos	Team	Pld	W	D	L	GF	GA	GD	Pts	Qualification
15	Helmond Sport	10	3	2	5	13	19	−6	11	
16	Telstar	10	3	1	6	10	17	−7	10	
17	Jong FC Utrecht	10	1	4	5	8	19	−11	7	Reserves teams cannot participate in the promotion play-offs
18	TOP Oss	10	2	1	7	5	18	−13	7	
19	Jong PSV	10	1	2	7	12	22	−10	5	Reserves teams cannot participate in the promotion play-offs

Source: Keuken Kampioen Divisie (in Dutch)
Rules for classification: 1) points; 2) goal difference; 3) number of goals scored

===== Period 3 =====
Pos	Team	Pld	W	D	L	GF	GA	GD	Pts	Qualification
16	Jong Ajax	10	2	3	5	11	14	−3	9	Reserves teams cannot participate in the promotion play-offs
17	Cambuur	10	2	2	6	17	23	−6	8	
18	Emmen	10	2	1	7	10	20	−10	7	
19	Jong FC Utrecht	10	1	2	7	7	17	−10	5	Reserves teams cannot participate in the promotion play-offs
20	Eindhoven	10	0	5	5	8	21	−13	5	

Source: Keuken Kampioen Divisie (in Dutch)
Rules for classification: 1) points; 2) goal difference; 3) number of goals scored

===== Period 4 =====
Pos	Team	Pld	W	D	L	GF	GA	GD	Pts	Qualification
16	ADO Den Haag	9	2	3	4	12	14	−2	9	
17	Eindhoven	9	2	3	4	10	14	−4	9	
18	Cambuur	9	2	2	5	9	15	−6	8	
19	VVV-Venlo	9	2	0	7	8	13	−5	6	
20	Jong FC Utrecht	9	0	3	6	7	21	−14	3	Reserves teams cannot participate in the promotion play-offs

Source: Keuken Kampioen Divisie (in Dutch)
Rules for classification: 1) points; 2) goal difference; 3) number of goals scored

==== Results summary ====
Overall								Home						Away					
Pld	W	D	L	GF	GA	GD	Pts	W	D	L	GF	GA	GD	W	D	L	GF	GA	GD
38	5	11	22	32	74	−42	26	4	7	8	16	25	−9	1	4	14	16	49	−33

Last updated: 13 May 2024.
Source: Eerste divisie

==== Results by round ====
Round	1	2	3	4	5	6	7	8	9	10	11	12	13	14	15	16	17	18	19	20	21	22	23	24	25	26	27	28	29	30	31	32	33	34	35	36	37	38
Ground	A	H	A	H	A	A	H	H	A	A	H	H	A	A	A	H	H	A	H	A	H	A	A	H	H	A	H	A	H	H	A	A	H	H	A	H	A	H
Result	L	W	L	W	L	D	W	D	L	L	D	D	D	L	L	W	D	L	L	L	D	L	D	L	L	W	L	L	L	L	L	L	D	L	L	L	D	D
Position	15	11	17	10	16	16	12	13	15	15	15	15	14	16	16	15	15	16	17	17	17	17	17	17	17	17	18	19	20	20	20	20	20	20	20	20	20	20

Updated to match(es) played on 4 May 2024. Source: Eerste divisie
A = Away; H = Home; W = Win; D = Draw; L = Loss

==== Matches ====
The league fixtures were announced on 30 June 2023.

14 August 2023 1	Jong AZ	1–0	Jong FC Utrecht	Wijdewormer
20:00 CEST (UTC+2)	Addai 45+2'; Van Aken (yellow card) 53'; Postma (yellow card) 62' (yellow-red card) 86'	Report	El Arguioui (yellow card) 44'	Stadium: AFAS Trainingscomplex; Attendance: 552; Referee: Jesse Rozendal

21 August 2023 2	Jong FC Utrecht	1–0	FC Groningen	Utrecht
20:00 CEST (UTC+2)	Rijks 38'	Report	Määttä (yellow card) 81'	Stadium: Stadion Galgenwaard; Attendance: 1,030; Referee: Clay Ruperti

25 August 2023 3	VVV-Venlo	4–1	Jong FC Utrecht	Venlo
20:00 CEST (UTC+2)	Ketting 7'; Smans 25', (yellow card) 51'; Allouch 56'; Kosidis 70'	Report	Held 45+1'	Stadium: Covebo Stadion - De Koel; Attendance: 5,451; Referee: Michael Eijgelsheim

1 September 2023 4	Jong FC Utrecht	1–0	Roda JC Kerkrade	Utrecht
20:00 CEST (UTC+2)	El Arguioui (yellow card) 30'; Van Hees (yellow card) 54'; Mukeh (yellow card) 81'; Van de Haar 90+3'	Report	Didden (yellow card) 38'; Ouaissa (yellow card) 80'	Stadium: Sportcomplex Zoudenbalch; Attendance: 762; Referee: Martijn Vos

15 September 2023 6	FC Dordrecht	3–3	Jong FC Utrecht	Dordrecht
20:00 CEST (UTC+2)	't Zand (yellow card) 31', (goal) 58', 62'; Tsoungui (yellow card) 76'; Noc 90+4'; Bronkhorst (yellow card) 90+4'	Report	Blake 27', 54'; Rijks 39'; Rohd Schlichting (yellow card) 53'; Van der Wegen (yellow card) 77'; Andersen (yellow card) 90+3'	Stadium: Matchoholic Stadion; Attendance: 1,869; Referee: Kevin Puts

18 September 2023 5	FC Emmen	2–0	Jong FC Utrecht	Emmen
20:00 CEST (UTC+2)	Brouwer (yellow card) 11'; Heylen 41'; Konings (yellow card) 46'; Ubbink 74'; Scholte (yellow card) 89'	Report	Held 29'; Leliendal 48'; Augustinus-Jensen 78'; Mukeh 80'; Andersen 90+4'	Stadium: De Oude Meerdijk; Attendance: 6,731; Referee: Luuk Timmer

22 September 2023 7	Jong FC Utrecht	3–2	SC Cambuur	Utrecht
20:00 CEST (UTC+2)	Rijks 4'; Held (yellow card) 25'; Van Hees (yellow card) 29'; Augustinus-Jensen 45+1'; Leliendal (yellow card) 66'; El Arguioui 88', (yellow card) 88'	Report	Smit 16' (pen.); Balk (yellow card) 50'; El Hilali 59'	Stadium: Stadion Galgenwaard; Attendance: 468; Referee: Wouter Wiersma

22 September 2023 8	Jong FC Utrecht	1–1	NAC Breda	Utrecht
20:00 CEST (UTC+2)	Van der Wegen 30'; Raatsie (yellow card) 45+1'; Akkerman (yellow card) 89'	Report	Agougil (yellow card) 51'; Kooy 62' (o.g.)	Stadium: Stadion Galgenwaard; Attendance: 678; Referee: Jesse Rozendal

6 October 2023 9	Helmond Sport	4–0	Jong FC Utrecht	Helmond
20:00 CEST (UTC+2)	Kaars 4', 68'; Amuzu 13'; Botos 52'	Report	Hardley (yellow card) 33'; Van der Wegen (yellow card) 73'	Stadium: GS Staalwerken Stadion; Attendance: 1,463; Referee: Boyd van Kommer

23 October 2023 10	TOP Oss	2–0	Jong FC Utrecht	Oss
20:00 CEST (UTC+2)	Zimmerman 9'; Mulder (yellow card) 39'; Van Peer 90+1'	Report	El Arguioui (yellow card) 44'; Blake (yellow card) 54'; Held (yellow card) 69'	Stadium: Frans Heesen Stadion; Attendance: 1,350; Referee: Stan Teuben

30 October 2023 12	Jong FC Utrecht	1–1	MVV Maastricht	Utrecht
20:00 CET (UTC+1)	Augustinus-Jensen 41'	Report	Smeets 35'; Coomans (yellow card) 61'	Stadium: Sportcomplex Zoudenbalch; Attendance: 253; Referee: Clay Ruperti

4 November 2023 13	FC Den Bosch	1–1	Jong FC Utrecht	's-Hertogenbosch
18:45 CET (UTC+1)	Mulders (yellow card) 27'; Zelalem (yellow card) 50'; Boumassaoudi 54'; Ikeshita (yellow card) 71'	Report	Held (yellow card) 68'; El Arguioui 72'; Blake (yellow card) 83'	Stadium: Stadion De Vliert; Attendance: 4,096; Referee: Robin Vereijken

10 November 2023 14	Willem II	2–1	Jong FC Utrecht	Tilburg
20:00 CET (UTC+1)	Svensson 67'; Behounek (yellow card) 68'; Hilterman 77'	Report	Held 21'; Rohd Schlichting (yellow card) 42'; Akkerman (yellow card) 65', (red card) 68'; Bukala (yellow card) 90+1'	Stadium: Koning Willem II Stadion; Attendance: 12,909; Referee: Jannick van der Laan

24 November 2023 16	Jong FC Utrecht	2–0	De Graafschap	Utrecht
20:00 CET (UTC+1)	Augustinus-Jensen 28'; Rohd Schlichting (yellow card) 65'; Van de Haar 90+4'	Report		Stadium: Sportcomplex Zoudenbalch; Attendance: 452; Referee: Thomas Hardeman

27 November 2023 15	ADO Den Haag	6–0	Jong FC Utrecht	The Hague
20:00 CET (UTC+1)	Van der Sande 14', 37', 41'; Ideho 38'; Van Mieghem (yellow card) 47', (goal) 73'; Veerman (yellow card) 64'; Van Hintum (yellow card) 72'; Sellouki 76'	Report	Andersen (yellow card) 63'; Viereck (yellow card) 87'; Boumenjal (yellow card) 90'	Stadium: Bingoal Stadion; Attendance: 4,295; Referee: Luuk Timmer

1 December 2023 11	Jong FC Utrecht	0–0	Jong PSV	Utrecht
20:00 CET (UTC+1)	Andersen (yellow card) 32'	Report	El Meliani (yellow card) 60'	Stadium: Sportcomplex Zoudenbalch; Attendance: 310; Referee: Michael Eijgelsheim

4 December 2023 17	Jong FC Utrecht	0–0	Telstar	Utrecht
20:00 CET (UTC+1)	Van Hees (yellow card) 28'; Bukala (yellow card) 42'; Blake (yellow card) 79'; Held (yellow card) 87'; Rohd Schlichting (yellow card) 90+2'	Report	Soares (yellow card) 35' (yellow-red card) 83'	Stadium: Sportcomplex Zoudenbalch; Attendance: 272; Referee: Boyd van Kommer

11 December 2023 18	Jong Ajax	2–1	Jong FC Utrecht	Amsterdam
20:00 CET (UTC+1)	Kalokoh 41'; Idumbo Muzambo 61'; Henry (yellow card) 90'	Report	Kooy 37'; Iqbal (yellow card) 43'; Leliendal (yellow card) 45'; Augustinus-Jensen (yellow card) 51'	Stadium: Sportcomplex De Toekomst; Attendance: 572; Referee: Jesse Rozendal

15 December 2023 19	Jong FC Utrecht	2–5	FC Eindhoven	Utrecht
20:00 CET (UTC+1)	Rijks 6', 90'; Viereck (red card) 31'; Andersen (yellow card) 63'	Report	Amevor (penalty missed) 32', 86'; Dorenbosch 33'; Rottier 71'; Sleegers 75'; Kökçü 90+3'	Stadium: Sportcomplex Zoudenbalch; Attendance: 310; Referee: Robin Vereijken

22 December 2023 20	FC Groningen	2–1	Jong FC Utrecht	Groningen
20:00 CET (UTC+1)	Duarte 61'; Postema 71'	Report	Yah (yellow card) 30'; Van de Haar 38'; Kooy (yellow card) 60'; El Arguioui (yellow card) 90+2'	Stadium: Euroborg; Attendance: 18,698; Referee: Wouter Wiersma

15 January 2024 21	Jong FC Utrecht	0–0	VVV-Venlo	Utrecht
20:00 CET (UTC+1)	Kooy (yellow card) 10'; Edhart (yellow card) 72'	Report		Stadium: Sportcomplex Zoudenbalch; Attendance: 303; Referee: Kevin Puts

19 January 2024 22	MVV Maastricht	3–0	Jong FC Utrecht	Maastricht
20:00 CET (UTC+1)	Smeets 25', 87'; Livramento 50'; Kleinen (yellow card) 73'; Aktaş (yellow card) 82'	Report	Mukeh (yellow card) 77'	Stadium: Stadion De Geusselt; Attendance: 3,744; Referee: Tim De Keyzer (Belgium)

26 January 2024 23	Roda JC Kerkrade	0–0	Jong FC Utrecht	Kerkrade
20:00 CET (UTC+1)	Peña Zauner (penalty missed) 65'	Report	Held (yellow card) 45+1'	Stadium: Parkstad Limburg Stadion; Attendance: 7,085; Referee: Michael Eijgelsheim

5 February 2024 24	Jong FC Utrecht	0–1	Jong Ajax	Utrecht
20:00 CET (UTC+1)	Van de Haar (yellow card) 50'; Van Hees (yellow card) 78'; Andersen (yellow card) 90+2'	Report	Banel 35'; Kaplan (yellow card) 90+2'	Stadium: Sportcomplex Zoudenbalch; Attendance: 371; Referee: Boyd van Kommer

12 February 2024 25	Jong FC Utrecht	1–2	Jong AZ	Utrecht
20:00 CET (UTC+1)	Van de Haar (penalty missed) 35'; Held (yellow card) 45+2'; Andersen 65' (pen.); Jenner (yellow card) 78'; Kooy (yellow card) 81'	Report	Schouten (yellow card) 21'; Koster 38' (pen.), (penalty missed) 57'; Daal 61', (yellow card) 79'	Stadium: Sportcomplex Zoudenbalch; Attendance: 262; Referee: Luuk Timmer

16 February 2024 26	SC Cambuur	2–4	Jong FC Utrecht	Leeuwarden
20:00 CET (UTC+1)	Anello (yellow card) 31'; Van Mullem 32', (yellow card) 48'; Smit 84'	Report	Kooy (yellow card) 32'; Van de Haar 45', 56'; Blake 50'; Edhart 85'; Rohd Schlichting (yellow card) 86'	Stadium: Cambuur Stadion; Attendance: 9,462; Referee: Stan Teuben

26 February 2024 27	Jong FC Utrecht	0–3	TOP Oss	Utrecht
20:00 CET (UTC+1)	Boumenjal (yellow card) 38'; Jenner (yellow card) 64'	Report	Lambrix (yellow card) 45+3'; Doumtsios 52'; Stensrud 62', 89'	Stadium: Sportcomplex Zoudenbalch; Attendance: 366; Referee: Kevin Puts

1 March 2024 28	NAC Breda	3–1	Jong FC Utrecht	Breda
20:00 CET (UTC+1)	Lucassen 42'; Sejdiu 59'; Jensen 66'	Report	Edhart 64'	Stadium: Rat Verlegh Stadion; Attendance: 17,736; Referee: Martin van den Kerkhof

8 March 2024 29	Jong FC Utrecht	0–1	Helmond Sport	Utrecht
20:00 CET (UTC+1)	Hardley (yellow card) 69'; Boumenjal (yellow card) 73'	Report	Ostrc (yellow card) 13'; Amuzu 38'; Botos (yellow card) 84'	Stadium: Sportcomplex Zoudenbalch; Attendance: 322; Referee: Thomas Hardeman

11 March 2024 31	FC Eindhoven	3–0	Jong FC Utrecht	Eindhoven
20:00 CET (UTC+1)	Kökçü 11'; Viereck 37' (o.g.); Limouri 63'	Report	Mukeh (yellow card) 56'	Stadium: Jan Louwers Stadion; Attendance: 1,810; Referee: Robin Vereijken

15 March 2024 30	Jong FC Utrecht	2–3	FC Emmen	Utrecht
20:00 CET (UTC+1)	Te Wierik 31' (o.g.); Andersen (yellow card) 34'; Rohd Schlichting (yellow card) 39'; Edhart (yellow card) 56'; Akkerman 74'	Report	Vos (yellow card) 28'; Konings (yellow card) 40'; Brouwer 73'; Smeets (yellow card) 87'; Te Wierik 90+3'; Ubbink 90+6'	Stadium: Sportcomplex Zoudenbalch; Attendance: 354; Referee: Nick Smit

29 March 2024 32	Telstar	5–1	Jong FC Utrecht	Velsen-Zuid
20:00 CET (UTC+1)	Seedorf 1', 72'; Tahiri 40', 55'; Kaandorp 49', (yellow card) 56'; Turfkruier (yellow card) 52'	Report	Edhart 21'; Van Hees (yellow card) 39'	Stadium: 711 Stadion; Attendance: 2,140; Referee: Wouter Wiersma

8 April 2024 33	Jong FC Utrecht	1–1	Willem II	Utrecht
20:00 CEST (UTC+2)	Held (yellow card) 63'; Descotte 86'	Report	Bokila (yellow card) 71'; Hilterman 90+1'; Schouten (yellow card) 90+2'	Stadium: Stadion Galgenwaard; Attendance: 876; Referee: Boyd van Kommer

15 April 2024 34	Jong FC Utrecht	0–2	FC Den Bosch	Utrecht
20:00 CEST (UTC+2)	Held (yellow card) 43'; Yah (yellow card) 63'	Report	Vicario 57'; Hegyi (yellow card) 86'; Gyamfi (yellow card) 90+2'; Van Bakel 90+3'	Stadium: Sportcomplex Zoudenbalch; Attendance: 282; Referee: Nick Smit

22 April 2024 35	Jong PSV	2–0	Jong FC Utrecht	Eindhoven
20:00 CEST (UTC+2)	Uneken 34'; Nassoh 73'	Report	Edhart (red card) 29'; Mukeh (yellow card) 29'	Stadium: PSV Campus De Herdgang; Attendance: 750; Referee: Michael Eijgelsheim

29 April 2024 36	Jong FC Utrecht	0–2	ADO Den Haag	Utrecht
20:00 CEST (UTC+2)	Van de Haar (yellow card) 49'; Hardley (yellow card) 59' (yellow-red card) 70'; El Arguioui (yellow card) 60'	Report	Esajas (yellow card) 66'; Veerman 71' (pen.); Asante (yellow card) 73'; Waem 76', (yellow card) 80'	Stadium: Stadion Galgenwaard; Attendance: 837; Referee: Wouter Wiersma

3 May 2024 37	De Graafschap	2–2	Jong FC Utrecht	Doetinchem
20:00 CEST (UTC+2)	Önal 8'; Schenk (yellow card) 81'; Flakus Bosilj 90+2'	Report	Oehlers 37'; Van de Haar 47', (yellow card) 84'; Van Hees (yellow card) 55'; Andersen (yellow card) 78'	Stadium: Stadion De Vijverberg; Attendance: 7,500; Referee: Stan Teuben

10 May 2024 38	Jong FC Utrecht	1–1	FC Dordrecht	Utrecht
20:00 CEST (UTC+2)	Rohd Schlichting 85'	Report	Smolarczyk (yellow card) 22'; Segecic 39'; 't Zand (yellow card) 43'; Tsoungui (yellow card) 90+1'	Stadium: Sportcomplex Zoudenbalch; Attendance: 419; Referee: Wouter Wiersma

== Statistics ==
=== Goalscorers ===
Friendlies

No.	Name	Goal
1.	(Netherlands) Mohamed Mallahi	2
1.	(Netherlands) Aurelio Oehlers	2
3.	(Netherlands) Mees Akkerman	1
3.	(England) Adrian Blake	1
3.	(Netherlands) Mees Rijks	1
3.	(Denmark) Emil Rohd Schlichting	1
3.	(Netherlands) Neal Viereck	1
Own goals opponent		–
Totals		9

(Netherlands) Keuken Kampioen Divisie

No.	Name	Goal
1.	(Netherlands) Jesse van de Haar	6
2.	(Netherlands) Mees Rijks	5
3.	(Denmark) Tobias Augustinus-Jensen	3
3.	(England) Adrian Blake	3
3.	(Netherlands) Lynden Edhart	3
6.	(Netherlands) Rafik El Arguioui	2
6.	(Curaçao) Nazjir Held	2
8.	(Netherlands) Mees Akkerman	1
8.	(Denmark) Silas Andersen	1
8.	(Belgium) Anthony Descotte	1
8.	(Netherlands) Wessel Kooy	1
8.	(Netherlands) Aurelio Oehlers	1
8.	(Denmark) Emil Rohd Schlichting	1
8.	(Netherlands) Sil van der Wegen	1
Own goals opponent		1
Totals		32

=== Assists ===
(Netherlands) Keuken Kampioen Divisie

No.	Name	
1.	(Denmark) Emil Rohd Schlichting	4
2.	(Netherlands) Olivier van Eldik	3
3.	(Netherlands) Rafik El Arguioui	2
3.	(Netherlands) Yannick Leliendal	2
3.	(Netherlands) Mees Rijks	2
3.	(Netherlands) Gibson Yah	2
7.	(Netherlands) Mees Akkerman	1
7.	(Denmark) Tobias Augustinus-Jensen	1
7.	(England) Adrian Blake	1
7.	(Curaçao) Nazjir Held	1
7.	(Indonesia) Ivar Jenner	1
7.	(Netherlands) Sil van der Wegen	1
Totals		21

== Attendance Stadion Galgenwaard ==
Round	Opponent	Attendance	Total attendance	Average
Keuken Kampioen Divisie
2	FC Groningen	1,030	1,030	1,030
7	SC Cambuur	468	1,498	749
8	NAC Breda	678	2,176	725
33	Willem II	876	3,052	763
36	ADO Den Haag	837	3,889	778

== Attendance Sportcomplex Zoudenbalch ==
Round	Opponent	Attendance	Total attendance	Average
Friendlies
N/A	(Germany) Wuppertaler SV	0 (Note: Behind closed doors.)	0	0
N/A	(Netherlands) TOP Oss	Unknown	0	0
N/A	(Netherlands) Telstar	Unknown	0	0
N/A	(Netherlands) Jong Sparta Rotterdam	Unknown	0	0
N/A	(Netherlands) FC Den Bosch	0	0	0
Keuken Kampioen Divisie
4	Roda JC Kerkrade	762	762	762
12	MVV Maastricht	253	1,015	508
16	De Graafschap	452	1,467	489
11	Jong PSV	310	1,777	444
17	Telstar	272	2,049	410
19	FC Eindhoven	310	2,359	393
21	VVV-Venlo	303	2,662	380
24	Jong Ajax	371	3,033	379
25	Jong AZ	262	3,295	366
27	TOP Oss	366	3,661	366
29	Helmond Sport	322	3,983	362
30	FC Emmen	354	4,337	361
34	FC Den Bosch	282	4,619	355
38	FC Dordrecht	419	5,038	360
