= 2024–25 FC Utrecht season =

FC Utrecht
2024–25 season
- Owner: Frans van Seumeren Holding B.V. (99%); Stichting Continuïteit FC Utrecht (1%) overige aandeelhouders (41%)
- Chairman: Steef Klop
- Head coach: Ron Jans
- Stadium: Stadion Galgenwaard
- Eredivisie: 4th
- KNVB Cup: Quarter-final
- Top goalscorer: League: Paxten Aaronson (8); All: Miguel Rodríguez (10)
- Highest home attendance: 22,711 (vs FC Groningen, 13 April 2025, Eredivisie)
- Lowest home attendance: 0 (vs PEC Zwolle, 11 August 2024, Eredivisie)
- Average home league attendance: 20,658
- Biggest win: 0–8 (vs AFC, 18 December 2024, KNVB Cup)
- Biggest defeat: 2–5 (vs PSV, 1 December 2024, (vs Fortuna Sittard, 22 December 2024, Eredivisie)
Home colours

The 2024–25 season was the 55th season in the existence of FC Utrecht and the club's 55th consecutive season in the top flight of Dutch football. In addition to the domestic league, FC Utrecht participated in this season's editions of the KNVB Cup.

== Players ==
=== First-team squad ===
As of 15 May 2025

Note: Flags indicate national team as defined under FIFA eligibility rules; some limited exceptions apply. Players may hold more than one non-FIFA nationality.

No.	Pos.	Nation	Player
1	GK	GRE	Vasilis Barkas
2	DF	BEL	Siebe Horemans
3	DF	NED	Mike van der Hoorn
5	DF	ISL	Kolbeinn Finnsson
6	MF	DEN	Oscar Fraulo (on loan from Borussia Mönchengladbach)
7	MF	DEN	Victor Jensen
8	MF	GER	Can Bozdoğan
9	FW	NED	David Min
~~10~~	MF	USA	~~Taylor Booth~~ (Note: Left during the season.)
11	FW	NED	Noah Ohio
14	MF	IRQ	Zidane Iqbal
15	FW	ENG	Adrian Blake
16	DF	MAR	Souffian El Karouani
18	MF	NED	Jens Toornstra
19	FW	BEL	Anthony Descotte (on loan from RSC Charleroi)
20	FW	FRA	Yoann Cathline (on loan from FC Lorient)
21	MF	USA	Paxten Aaronson (on loan from Eintracht Frankfurt)

No.	Pos.	Nation	Player
22	FW	ESP	Miguel Rodríguez (on loan from Celta de Vigo)
23	DF	DEN	Niklas Vesterlund
24	DF	NED	Nick Viergever (captain)
25	GK	NED	Michael Brouwer
26	FW	NED	Miliano Jonathans
27	MF	BEL	Alonzo Engwanda
32	GK	NED	Tom de Graaff
33	GK	NED	Kevin Gadellaa
40	DF	BEL	Matisse Didden
41	DF	NED	Massien Ghaddari
42	DF	USA	Rickson van Hees
43	MF	NED	Rafik El Arguioui
44	DF	NED	Joshua Mukeh
~~46~~	MF	DEN	~~Silas Andersen~~
51	GK	DEN	Andreas Dithmer
~~77~~	FW	NED	~~Ole Romeny~~
91	FW	CIV	Sébastien Haller (on loan from Borussia Dortmund)

== Transfers ==
=== Summer ===
==== Transfers in ====
Nat.	Pos.	Player	Transferred from	Particularities	Ref.
(Belgium) BEL	DF	Matisse Didden	(Netherlands) Roda JC	Purchased	
(Iceland) ISL	DF	Kolbeinn Finnsson	(Denmark) Lyngby BK	Purchased	
(Netherlands) NED	GK	Tom de Graaff	(Netherlands) Jong Ajax	Purchased	
(Netherlands) NED	FW	David Min	(Netherlands) RKC Waalwijk	Purchased	
(Netherlands) NED	FW	Noah Ohio	(Belgium) Standard Liège	Purchased	
(Netherlands) NED	DF	Ryan Flamingo	(Italy) US Sassuolo	Buy option lifted	
(United States) USA	MF	Paxten Aaronson	(Germany) Eintracht Frankfurt	On loan	
(France) FRA	FW	Yoann Cathline	(France) FC Lorient	On loan (+option to buy)	
(Denmark) DEN	MF	Oscar Fraulo	(Germany) Borussia Mönchengladbach	On loan (+option to buy)	
(Spain) ESP	FW	Miguel Rodríguez	(Spain) Celta de Vigo	On loan (+option to buy)	
(Netherlands) NED	GK	Michael Brouwer	(Netherlands) Heracles Almelo	Transfer free	
(Belgium) BEL	MF	Alonzo Engwanda	(Belgium) RSCA Futures	Transfer free	
(Belgium) BEL	DF	Siebe Horemans	(Netherlands) Excelsior	Transfer free	
(Denmark) DEN	MF	Silas Andersen	(Netherlands) Jong FC Utrecht	Internal transfer	
(England) ENG	FW	Adrian Blake	(Netherlands) Jong FC Utrecht	Internal transfer	
(Netherlands) NED	GK	Kevin Gadellaa	(Netherlands) Jong FC Utrecht	Internal transfer	
(Netherlands) NED	DF	Joshua Mukeh	(Netherlands) Jong FC Utrecht	Internal transfer	
(Netherlands) NED	MF	Luuk Brouwers	(Netherlands) sc Heerenveen	Back from loan (+obligation to buy)	
(Netherlands) NED	GK	Calvin Raatsie	(Netherlands) Roda JC	Back from loan	

==== Transfers out ====
Nat.	Pos.	Player	Transferred to	Particularities	Ref.
(Netherlands) NED	DF	Mark van der Maarel	Retired		
(Netherlands) NED	FW	Marouan Azarkan	(United Arab Emirates) Al-Nasr SC	Sold	
(Netherlands) NED	DF	Ryan Flamingo	(Netherlands) PSV	Sold	
(Sweden) SWE	FW	Isac Lidberg	(Germany) SV Darmstadt 98	Sold	
(Denmark) DEN	FW	Jeppe Okkels	(England) Preston North End	Sold	
(Netherlands) NED	GK	Calvin Raatsie	(Netherlands) Excelsior	Sold	
(Netherlands) NED	MF	Luuk Brouwers	(Netherlands) sc Heerenveen	Obligation to buy	
(Netherlands) NED	DF	Hidde ter Avest	(England) Oxford United FC	Transfer free	
(Belgium) BEL	FW	Othmane Boussaid	(United Arab Emirates) Al-Nasr SC	Transfer free	
(Netherlands) NED	GK	Thijmen Nijhuis	(Finland) HJK Helsinki	Transfer free	
(Netherlands) NED	GK	Mattijs Branderhorst	(Netherlands) Fortuna Sittard	On loan	
(Netherlands) NED	DF	Ryan Flamingo	(Italy) US Sassuolo	Back from loan (+option to buy)	
(Denmark) DEN	MF	Oscar Fraulo	(Germany) Borussia Mönchengladbach	Back from loan (+option to buy)	
(Germany) GER	DF	Tim Handwerker	(Germany) 1. FC Nürnberg	Back from loan (+option to buy)	
(Netherlands) NED	FW	Sam Lammers	(Scotland) Rangers FC	Back from loan	

=== Winter ===
==== Transfers in ====
Nat.	Pos.	Player	Transferred from	Particularities	Ref.
(Netherlands) NED	FW	Miliano Jonathans	(Netherlands) Vitesse	Purchased	
(Ivory Coast) CIV	FW	Sébastien Haller	(Germany) Borussia Dortmund	On loan	

==== Transfers out ====
Nat.	Pos.	Player	Transferred to	Particularities	Ref.
(Denmark) DEN	MF	Silas Andersen	(Sweden) BK Häcken	Sold	
(United States) USA	MF	Taylor Booth	(Netherlands) FC Twente	Sold	
(Netherlands) NED	FW	Ole Romeny	(England) Oxford United FC	Sold	

== Pre-season and friendlies ==
Win Draw Loss Fixtures

29 June 2024 Friendly	FC Utrecht (Netherlands)	4–2	(Netherlands) USV Elinkwijk	Utrecht, Netherlands
15:00 CEST (UTC+2)	Romeny 10'; Jensen 44'; Min 62' (pen.), 84'	Report	Louwaars 26'; Grilk 33'	Stadium: Sportpark Elinkwijk; Attendance: 1,761; Referee: Nurretin Eren

6 July 2024 Friendly	FC Utrecht (Netherlands)	2–2	(Denmark) Silkeborg IF	Oosterbeek, Netherlands
14:00 CEST (UTC+2)	Descotte 46'; Okkels 48'	Report	Adamsen 30', 53'	Stadium: Sportpark de Bilderberg; Attendance: 0 Referee: Unknown
Note: Behind closed doors.

18 July 2024 Friendly	FC Utrecht (Netherlands)	4–1	(Qatar) Al-Rayyan SC	Utrecht, Netherlands
14:00 CEST (UTC+2)	Toornstra 5'; Romeny 32'; Ohio 71'; Min 85'	Report	Rodrigo 26'	Stadium: Sportpark Elinkwijk; Attendance: Unknown; Referee: Unknown

19 July 2024 Friendly	FC Schalke 04 (Germany)	0–2	(Netherlands) FC Utrecht	Gelsenkirchen, Germany
13:00 CEST (UTC+2)	Bachmann (yellow card)	Report	Ohio 77'; Descotte 83'	Attendance: 0 Referee: Unknown
Note: Behind closed doors.

27 July 2024 Friendly	FC Utrecht (Netherlands)	2–1	(France) RC Lens	Utrecht, Netherlands
12:00 CEST (UTC+2)	Toornstra 45', (yellow card); Horemans 80'	Report	Still (red card) 25'; Fulgini 35'; Haïdara (yellow card); Gradit (yellow card)	Stadium: Sportcomplex Zoudenbalch; Attendance: 0 Referee: Richard Martens
Note: Behind closed doors.

27 July 2024 Friendly	FC Utrecht (Netherlands)	4–5	(France) RC Lens	Utrecht, Netherlands
14:00 CEST (UTC+2)	Descotte 9'; Jenner 34'; Blake 53'; Rodríguez (penalty missed); Lidberg 73'	Report	Spierings 13'; Saïd 14', 56'; Labeau Lascary 64' (pen.); Pouilly 84', (yellow card)	Stadium: Sportcomplex Zoudenbalch; Attendance: 0 Referee: Steve Janssen
Note: Behind closed doors.

1 August 2024 Friendly	FC Utrecht (Netherlands)	1–2	(Italy) Venezia FC	Utrecht, Netherlands
19:00 CEST (UTC+2)	Okkels (yellow card); Romeny 82'	Report	Doumbia 66'; Lella 90+1'	Stadium: Stadion Galgenwaard; Attendance: 3,825; Referee: Marc Nagtegaal

12 August 2024 Friendly	PEC Zwolle (Netherlands)	0–3	(Netherlands) FC Utrecht	Zwolle, Netherlands
12:00 CEST (UTC+2)	Fontana (yellow card)	Report	Jensen 21'; Van Hees 42'; El Arguioui 77'; Mukeh (yellow card)	Stadium: MAC³PARK Stadion; Attendance: 0 Referee: Rick Sturm
Note: Behind closed doors.

20 August 2024 Friendly	FC Utrecht (Netherlands)	1–3	(Netherlands) Sparta Rotterdam	Utrecht, Netherlands
14:00 CEST (UTC+2)	Andersen 48'	Report	Brym 68', (yellow card); Kleijn 78'; Bais 84'	Stadium: Stadion Galgenwaard; Attendance: 0 Referee: Alex Bos
Note: Behind closed doors.

27 August 2024 Friendly	NAC Breda (Netherlands)	1–1	(Netherlands) FC Utrecht	Zundert, Netherlands
12:00 CEST (UTC+2)	Kostorz 14'	Report	Descotte 17'	Stadium: Midglas Trainingscentrum; Attendance: 0 Referee: Unknown
Note: Behind closed doors.

5 September 2024 Friendly	Heracles Almelo (Netherlands)	0–3	(Netherlands) FC Utrecht	Almelo, Netherlands
12:00 CEST (UTC+2)		Report	Rodríguez 8'; Cathline 57'; Romeny 81'	Stadium: Heracles-VDL Trainingscomplex; Attendance: 0 Referee: Niels Mulder
Note: Behind closed doors.

30 September 2024 Friendly	FC Utrecht (Netherlands)	2–3	(Netherlands) Heracles Almelo	Overvecht, Netherlands
12:00 CEST (UTC+2)	Rodríguez 74'; Ohio 78'	Report	Sambo 7'; Bruns 15'; Bruijn 66'	Stadium: FC Utrecht Topsportcentrum; Attendance: 0 Referee: Nurretin Eren
Note: Behind closed doors.

9 October 2024 Friendly	FC Utrecht (Netherlands)	4–0	(Netherlands) Vitesse	Overvecht, Netherlands
12:00 CEST (UTC+2)	Descotte 27' (pen.), 50'; Rodríguez 52'; Bozdoğan 73'	Report		Stadium: FC Utrecht Topsportcentrum; Attendance: 0 Referee: Alex Bos
Note: Behind closed doors.

14 November 2024 Friendly	AZ (Netherlands)	1–2	(Netherlands) FC Utrecht	Wijdewormer, Netherlands
Unknown	Lahdo 63'	Report	Min 67'; Blake 75'	Stadium: AFAS Trainingscomplex; Attendance: 0 Referee: Unknown
Note: Behind closed doors.

7 January 2025 Friendly	FC Utrecht (Netherlands)	5–2	(Netherlands) Willem II	Zeist, Netherlands
12:00 CET (UTC+1)	Toornstra 3'; Cathline 38'; Rodríguez 50'; Blake 64'; Andersen 114'	Report	Mathijsen 74'; Pivaš 118'	Stadium: KNVB Campus; Attendance: 0 Referee: Max Broekhuizen and Sander de Brito Roque
Note: Behind closed doors and the match was completed in four blocks of thirty minutes.

20 March 2025 Friendly	AZ (Netherlands)	3–1	(Netherlands) FC Utrecht	Wijdewormer, Netherlands
13:00 CET (UTC+1)	Meerdink 6', 31'; Buurmeester 64'	Report	Descotte 73'	Stadium: AFAS Trainingscomplex; Attendance: 0 Referee: Unknown
Note: Behind closed doors.

29 April 2025 Friendly	FC Groningen (Netherlands)	1–0	(Netherlands) FC Utrecht	Groningen, Netherlands
13:30 CEST (UTC+2)	Willumsson 52'	Report		Stadium: Euroborg; Attendance: Unknown; Referee: Marco Oosting

== Competitions ==
=== Overall record ===
Competition	First match	Last match	Starting round	Final position	Record							
Competition	First match	Last match	Starting round	Final position	Pld	W	D	L	GF	GA	GD	Win %
Eredivisie	11 August 2024	18 May 2025	Matchday 1	4th	34	18	10	6	62	45	+17	52.94
KNVB Cup	31 October 2024	4 February 2025	First round	Quarter-final	4	3	0	1	12	4	+8	75.00
Total					38	21	10	7	74	49	+25	55.26

Last updated: 18 May 2025
Source: Soccerway

=== Eredivisie ===
==== League table ====
Pos	Team	Pld	W	D	L	GF	GA	GD	Pts	Qualification or relegation
2	Ajax	34	24	6	4	67	32	+35	78	Qualification for the Champions League league phase
3	Feyenoord	34	20	8	6	76	38	+38	68	Qualification for the Champions League third qualifying round
4	Utrecht	34	18	10	6	62	45	+17	64	Qualification for the Europa League second qualifying round
5	AZ (O)	34	16	9	9	58	37	+21	57	Qualification for the European competition play-offs
6	Twente	34	15	9	10	62	49	+13	54	Qualification for the European competition play-offs

Source: Eredivisie
Rules for classification: 1) Points; 2) Goal difference; 3) Goals scored; 4) Head-to-head points; 5) Head-to-head goal difference; 6) Head-to-head away goals scored; 7) Play-off if relevant for deciding champion, relegation or participating in a European league, otherwise by draw. 8) Penalty shoot-out (only after a play-off)
(O) Play-off winners

==== Results summary ====
Overall								Home						Away					
Pld	W	D	L	GF	GA	GD	Pts	W	D	L	GF	GA	GD	W	D	L	GF	GA	GD
34	18	10	6	62	45	+17	64	9	3	5	28	24	+4	9	7	1	34	21	+13

Last updated: 18 May 2025.
Source: Eredivisie

==== Results by round ====
Round	1	2	3	4	5	6	7	8	9	10	11	12	13	14	15	16	17	18	19	20	21	22	23	24	25	26	27	28	29	30	31	32	33	34
Ground	H	A	A	H	A	H	A	H	A	H	A	H	A	H	A	H	H	A	H	A	A	H	A	H	A	H	H	A	H	A	H	A	H	A
Result	W	D	W	W	D	W	W	W	W	L	W	W	W	L	W	D	L	W	D	D	D	L	D	W	W	L	W	D	W	W	W	L	D	D
Position	7	8	4	3	3	3	2	2	2	3	3	2	2	3	2	3	3	3	3	3	3	4	5	3	3	4	4	4	4	4	4	4	4	4

Updated to match(es) played on 18 May 2025. Source: Eredivisie
A = Away; H = Home; W = Win; D = Draw; L = Loss

==== Matches ====
The league fixtures were announced on 24 June 2024.

11 August 2024 1	FC Utrecht	1–0	PEC Zwolle	Utrecht
14:30 CEST (UTC+2)	Romeny 16'	Report	Reijnders (yellow card) 43'; Fichtinger (yellow card) 87'; Krastev (yellow card) 89'	Stadium: Stadion Galgenwaard; Attendance: 0 Referee: Jannick van der Laan
Note: Match played without an audience.

17 August 2024 2	sc Heerenveen	1–1	FC Utrecht	Heerenveen
16:30 CEST (UTC+2)	Kersten (yellow card) 55'; Bochniewicz (yellow card) 63'; Van Ee (yellow card) 67'; Braude (yellow card) 69'; Trenskow 82'	Report	Romeny 3', (yellow card) 64'; Bozdoğan (yellow card) 69'	Stadium: Abe Lenstra Stadion; Attendance: 24,000; Referee: Danny Makkelie

24 August 2024 3	NAC Breda	1–2	FC Utrecht	Breda
21:00 CEST (UTC+2)	Van den Bergh (yellow card) 33'; Lucassen 37'; Kemper (yellow card) 41'; Kostorz (yellow card) 80'; Mol (red card) 90+4'	Report	El Karouani (yellow card) 82'; Ohio 90+1', 90+6', (yellow card) 90+1'	Stadium: Rat Verlegh Stadion; Attendance: 19,000; Referee: Ingmar Oostrom

1 September 2024 4	FC Utrecht	2–1	FC Twente	Utrecht
12:15 CEST (UTC+2)	Toornstra 14'; Bozdoğan 52'	Report	Lammers 11'; Bruns (yellow card) 19'; Taha (yellow card) 64'	Stadium: Stadion Galgenwaard; Attendance: 19,463; Referee: Dennis Higler

21 September 2024 6	FC Utrecht	3–2	Willem II	Utrecht
16:30 CEST (UTC+2)	Behounek 11' (o.g.); Ohio 37' (pen.); El Karouani (yellow card) 45+2'; Sigurgeirsson 53' (o.g.); Aaronson (yellow card) 90+3'	Report	Sandra 29', 43'; Maes (yellow card) 42' (yellow-red card) 42'; Bosch (yellow card) 45+2'; Meerveld (yellow card) 87'; Fatah (yellow card) 90+5'	Stadium: Stadion Galgenwaard; Attendance: 20,861; Referee: Joey Kooij

29 September 2024 7	AZ	1–2	FC Utrecht	Alkmaar
20:00 CEST (UTC+2)	Mijnans (yellow card) 21'; Parrott 24'	Report	Romeny (yellow card) 6'; Fraulo (yellow card) 26'; Cathline 32'; Aaronson 55'	Stadium: AFAS Stadion; Attendance: 17,500; Referee: Danny Makkelie

5 October 2024 8	FC Utrecht	3–2	RKC Waalwijk	Utrecht
21:00 CEST (UTC+2)	Viergever 28'; Aaronson 51'; Min 52'; Ohio (yellow card) 85'	Report	Cleonise 2'; Meijers (red card) 26'; Margaret 80' (pen.)	Stadium: Stadion Galgenwaard; Attendance: 22,019; Referee: Alex Bos

20 October 2024 9	FC Groningen	0–1	FC Utrecht	Groningen
14:30 CEST (UTC+2)	Peersman (yellow card) 69'; Vaessen (yellow card) 90+2'	Report	Aaronson (yellow card) 10'; Cathline 20'; Ohio (yellow card) 68'; El Karouani (yellow card) 89'; Rodríguez (yellow card) 90+3'	Stadium: Euroborg; Attendance: 22,160; Referee: Serdar Gözübüyük

27 October 2024 10	FC Utrecht	0–2	Feyenoord	Utrecht
12:15 CET (UTC+1)	Jensen (yellow card) 37'; Bozdoğan (yellow card) 75'; Aaronson (yellow card) 90+6'	Report	Carranza 12'; Timber 54', (yellow card) 90'; Hadj Moussa (yellow card) 88'	Stadium: Stadion Galgenwaard; Attendance: 22,396; Referee: Allard Lindhout

3 November 2024 11	Sparta Rotterdam	1–4	FC Utrecht	Rotterdam
14:30 CET (UTC+1)	Clement (yellow card) 39'; Van der Kust (red card) 68'; Lauritsen 90+1' (pen.)	Report	Jensen 15'; Rodríguez 85'; Van der Hoorn (yellow card) 87', (goal) 90+5'; Aaronson 88'	Stadium: Sparta Stadion 'Het Kasteel'; Attendance: 10,231; Referee: Joey Kooij

8 November 2024 12	FC Utrecht	1–0	Heracles Almelo	Utrecht
20:00 CET (UTC+1)	Aaronson 67'	Report	Mesík (yellow card) 90'	Stadium: Stadion Galgenwaard; Attendance: 22,031; Referee: Robin Hensgens

24 November 2024 13	N.E.C.	1–2	FC Utrecht	Nijmegen
12:15 CET (UTC+1)	Hansen 48'	Report	Cathline 35', (yellow card) 64'; Jensen 62'	Stadium: Goffertstadion; Attendance: 12,540; Referee: Bas Nijhuis

1 December 2024 14	FC Utrecht	2–5	PSV	Utrecht
12:15 CET (UTC+1)	Aaronson (yellow card) 14'; Rodríguez (yellow card) 24'; Descotte 34' (pen.); Horemans 88'	Report	Saibari (yellow card) 7', (goal) 12', 70'; Til (yellow card) 31', (goal) 54', 90+1'; Flamingo (yellow card) 57'; Boscagli (yellow card) 67'; Bakayoko 74'	Stadium: Stadion Galgenwaard; Attendance: 22,479; Referee: Danny Makkelie

4 December 2024 5	Ajax	2–2	FC Utrecht	Amsterdam
20:00 CET (UTC+1)	Gaaei 25'; Toornstra 29' (o.g.)	Report	Min 16'; Pasveer 80' (o.g.)	Stadium: Johan Cruijff ArenA; Attendance: 53,267; Referee: Serdar Gözübüyük

8 December 2024 15	Almere City FC	1–3	FC Utrecht	Almere
16:45 CET (UTC+1)	Nalić (yellow card) 51'; Providence (yellow card) 65'; Delaurier-Chaubet 86'	Report	Van der Hoorn 35', (yellow card) 63'; Iqbal 41', (yellow card) 48'; Rodríguez (yellow card) 45'; Ohio 90+4'	Stadium: Yanmar Stadion; Attendance: 3,729; Referee: Allard Lindhout

15 December 2024 16	FC Utrecht	3–3	Go Ahead Eagles	Utrecht
12:15 CET (UTC+1)	Rodríguez 12'; Blake 88', 90+7'; Aaronson (yellow card) 90+2'	Report	Llansana 5', (red card) 9'; Antman 63'; Linthorst (yellow card) 70'; Breum 73'; Everink (yellow card) 90+7'	Stadium: Stadion Galgenwaard; Attendance: 19,676; Referee: Sander van der Eijk

22 December 2024 17	FC Utrecht	2–5	Fortuna Sittard	Utrecht
14:30 CET (UTC+1)	Viergever 6', (red card) 90+4'; Barkas (yellow card) 15'; Van der Hoorn (yellow card) 47'; Cathline 57'; Min (yellow card) 68'	Report	Van Ottele (yellow card) 33'; Da Cruz (yellow card) 34', (goal) 85'; Tunjić 56'; Fosso (yellow card) 66'; Dahlhaus 75'; Bullaude 78'; Michut 90+6'	Stadium: Stadion Galgenwaard; Attendance: 21,882; Referee: Alex Bos

12 January 2025 18	Feyenoord	1–2	FC Utrecht	Rotterdam
14:30 CET (UTC+1)	Giménez 81' (pen.)	Report	Van der Hoorn (yellow card) 29'; Vesterlund 60'; Aaronson 65'	Stadium: De Kuip; Attendance: 47,500; Referee: Bas Nijhuis

18 January 2025 19	FC Utrecht	0–0	AZ	Utrecht
18:45 CET (UTC+1)		Report	Penetra (yellow card) 35'; Meerdink (yellow card) 89'; Addai (yellow card) 90+4'	Stadium: Stadion Galgenwaard; Attendance: 22,348; Referee: Dennis Higler

24 January 2025 20	Heracles Almelo	1–1	FC Utrecht	Almelo
20:00 CET (UTC+1)	Žambůrek (yellow card) 57'; Bruns 58'; Hornkamp (yellow card) 63'; Wieckhoff (yellow card) 81'; Scheperman (yellow card) 90+3'; Van Kaam (yellow card) 90+4'	Report	Van der Hoorn (yellow card) 42'; Aaronson (yellow card) 70'; El Karouani 90+1'	Stadium: Asito stadion Attendance: 11,945; Referee: Allard Lindhout

1 February 2025 21	PEC Zwolle	3–3	FC Utrecht	Zwolle
18:45 CET (UTC+1)	Vente 18', 70'; Van den Berg (yellow card) 28', (goal) 44'; Krastev (yellow card) 90+2'	Report	Descotte 55'; Fraulo 59'; Viergever 83'	Stadium: MAC³PARK stadion Attendance: 13,914; Referee: Joey Kooij

9 February 2025 22	FC Utrecht	0–1	Almere City FC	Utrecht
12:15 CET (UTC+1)	Viergever (yellow card) 59'	Report	Kadile 28'; Barbet (yellow card) 34'; Haye (yellow card) 70'; Robinet (yellow card) 71'; Balboa (yellow card) 83'; Visus (yellow card) 90+3'	Stadium: Stadion Galgenwaard; Attendance: 21,478; Referee: Robin Hensgens

15 February 2025 23	PSV	2–2	FC Utrecht	Eindhoven
16:30 CET (UTC+1)	Obispo 11'; Schouten (yellow card) 63'; Veerman (yellow card) 69'; Babadi 90+2'	Report	Van der Hoorn 16'; Min (yellow card) 32'; Aaronson (yellow card) 61', (goal) 75'	Stadium: Philips Stadion; Attendance: 34,600; Referee: Serdar Gözübüyük

1 March 2025 24	FC Utrecht	1–0	NAC Breda	Utrecht
16:30 CET (UTC+1)	Fraulo 59'; Iqbal (yellow card) 71'	Report	Staring (yellow card) 58'; Lucassen (yellow card) 80'; Van den Bergh (yellow card) 90+3'	Stadium: Stadion Galgenwaard; Attendance: 22,348; Referee: Erwin Blank

9 March 2025 25	Willem II	2–3	FC Utrecht	Tilburg
12:15 CET (UTC+1)	Lambert 17'; Sigurgeirsson 83'	Report	Haller 67'; Ohio 75', (yellow card) 87'; Blake 85', (yellow card) 86'	Stadium: Koning Willem II Stadion; Attendance: 13,500; Referee: Allard Lindhout

15 March 2025 26	FC Utrecht	0–1	N.E.C.	Utrecht
16:30 CET (UTC+1)		Report	Ouwejan (yellow card) 74'; Van Crooij 82' (pen.); Verdonk (yellow card) 90'; Önal (yellow card) 90+1'	Stadium: Stadion Galgenwaard; Attendance: 22,532; Referee: Martin van den Kerkhof

30 March 2025 27	FC Utrecht	2–0	sc Heerenveen	Utrecht
12:15 CEST (UTC+2)	Rodríguez 22'; Horemans (yellow card) 42'; Hopland 58' (o.g.)	Report	Braude (yellow card) 38'	Stadium: Stadion Galgenwaard; Attendance: 22,366; Referee: Jannick van der Laan

6 April 2025 28	Go Ahead Eagles	2–2	FC Utrecht	Deventer
14:30 CEST (UTC+2)	Edvardsen 14', (yellow card) 90+2'; Suray 17'	Report	Cathline 43'; Rodríguez 45', (yellow card) 74'; Fraulo (yellow card) 51'; Viergever (yellow card) 90+3'; Iqbal (yellow card) 90+3'	Stadium: De Adelaarshorst; Attendance: 9,997; Referee: Serdar Gözübüyük

13 April 2025 29	FC Utrecht	3–1	FC Groningen	Utrecht
12:15 CEST (UTC+2)	El Karouani 8'; Cathline 17'; Engwanda (yellow card) 33'; Haller 42'	Report	Resink (yellow card) 10', (goal) 32'; Van Bergen (yellow card) 18'	Stadium: Stadion Galgenwaard; Attendance: 22,711; Referee: Edwin van de Graaf

20 April 2025 31	FC Utrecht	4–0	Ajax	Utrecht
12:15 CEST (UTC+2)	Haller 29'; Rodríguez 52', 63'; Aaronson (yellow card) 45', (goal) 85'	Report	Henderson (yellow card) 39'; Brobbey (yellow card) 56'; Traoré (yellow card) 70'	Stadium: Stadion Galgenwaard; Attendance: 22,516; Referee: Bas Nijhuis

25 April 2025 30	RKC Waalwijk	0–4	FC Utrecht	Waalwijk
18:45 CEST (UTC+2)	Roemeratoe (yellow card) 66'	Report	Fraulo 15'; Haller 19'; Rodríguez (yellow card) 24', (goal) 27'; Didden (yellow card) 68'; Min 87'	Stadium: Mandemakers Stadion; Attendance: 7,183; Referee: Allard Lindhout

11 May 2025 32	FC Twente	2–0	FC Utrecht	Enschede
14:30 CEST (UTC+2)	Vlap 21'; Rots 57'	Report	Vesterlund (yellow card) 29'; Fraulo (yellow card) 75'	Stadium: De Grolsch Veste; Attendance: 30,000; Referee: Marc Nagtegaal

14 May 2025 33	FC Utrecht	1–1	Sparta Rotterdam	Utrecht
20:00 CEST (UTC+2)	Aaronson 36'; Van der Hoorn (yellow card) 90+16'	Report	Lauritsen 12'	Stadium: Stadion Galgenwaard; Attendance: 22,351; Referee: Dennis Higler

18 May 2025 34	Fortuna Sittard	0–0	FC Utrecht	Sittard
14:30 CEST (UTC+2)	Guth (yellow card) 73'; Tunjić (yellow card) 80'	Report		Stadium: Fortuna Sittard Stadion; Attendance: 11,023; Referee: Martijn Vos

=== KNVB Cup ===
31 October 2024 First round	FC Lisse	1–2	FC Utrecht	Lisse
21:00 CET (UTC+1)	Van der Putten (yellow card) 26'; De Bruin (yellow card) 59'; George 90+2'	Report	Bozdoğan 12'; Rodríguez 52'	Stadium: Sportpark Ter Specke; Attendance: 2,000; Referee: Martin Pérez

18 December 2024 Second round	AFC	0–8	FC Utrecht	Amsterdam
20:00 CET (UTC+1)	Van Weerdenburg (yellow card) 58'	Report	Jensen 34', 40', (yellow card) 40'; Rodríguez 43', 60'; Iqbal (yellow card) 55'; Blake 70'; Aaronson 78'; Min 87', 90'	Stadium: Sportpark Goed Genoeg; Attendance: 2,500; Referee: Robin Hensgens

15 January 2025 Round of 16	RKC Waalwijk	1–2	FC Utrecht	Waalwijk
20:00 CET (UTC+1)	Margaret 18'	Report	Iqbal (yellow card) 38'; Haller 46', 80' (pen.); Jensen (yellow card) 87'	Stadium: Mandemakers Stadion; Attendance: 3,079; Referee: Jeroen Manschot

4 February 2025 Quarter-final	Heracles Almelo	2–0	FC Utrecht	Almelo
20:00 CET (UTC+1)	Kulenović 8', (yellow card) 82'; Scheperman (yellow card) 27'; Rots 34'	Report	Viergever (yellow card) 17'	Stadium: Asito stadion Attendance: 7,784; Referee: Jeroen Manschot

== Statistics ==
=== Goalscorers ===
Friendlies

No.	Name	Goal
1.	(Belgium) Anthony Descotte	7
2.	(Netherlands) David Min	4
2.	(Netherlands) Ole Romeny	4
2.	(Spain) Miguel Rodríguez	4
5.	(England) Adrian Blake	3
5.	(Netherlands) Noah Ohio	3
5.	(Netherlands) Jens Toornstra	3
8.	(Denmark) Silas Andersen	2
8.	(France) Yoann Cathline	2
8.	(Denmark) Victor Jensen	2
11.	(Netherlands) Rafik El Arguioui	1
11.	(Germany) Can Bozdoğan	1
11.	(United States) Rickson van Hees	1
11.	(Belgium) Siebe Horemans	1
11.	(Indonesia) Ivar Jenner	1
11.	(Sweden) Isac Lidberg	1
11.	(Denmark) Jeppe Okkels	1
Own goals opponent		-
Totals		41

(Netherlands) Eredivisie

No.	Name	Goal
1.	(United States) Paxten Aaronson	8
2.	(Spain) Miguel Rodríguez	7
3.	(France) Yoann Cathline	6
4.	(Netherlands) Noah Ohio	5
5.	(Ivory Coast) Sébastien Haller	4
6.	(England) Adrian Blake	3
6.	(Denmark) Oscar Fraulo	3
6.	(Netherlands) Mike van der Hoorn	3
6.	(Netherlands) David Min	3
6.	(Netherlands) Nick Viergever	3
11.	(Belgium) Anthony Descotte	2
11.	(Denmark) Victor Jensen	2
11.	(Morocco) Souffian El Karouani	2
11.	(Netherlands) Ole Romeny	2
15.	(Germany) Can Bozdoğan	1
15.	(Belgium) Siebe Horemans	1
15.	(Iraq) Zidane Iqbal	1
15.	(Netherlands) Jens Toornstra	1
15.	(Denmark) Niklas Vesterlund	1
Own goals opponent		4
Totals		62

(Netherlands) KNVB Cup

No.	Name	Goal
1.	(Spain) Miguel Rodríguez	3
2.	(Ivory Coast) Sébastien Haller	2
2.	(Denmark) Victor Jensen	2
2.	(Netherlands) David Min	2
5.	(United States) Paxten Aaronson	1
5.	(England) Adrian Blake	1
5.	(Germany) Can Bozdoğan	1
Own goals opponent		-
Totals		12

=== Assists ===
(Netherlands) Eredivisie

No.	Name	
1.	(Morocco) Souffian El Karouani	8
2.	(France) Yoann Cathline	5
3.	(United States) Paxten Aaronson	4
3.	(Belgium) Siebe Horemans	4
3.	(Netherlands) Jens Toornstra	4
6.	(Denmark) Oscar Fraulo	3
6.	(Denmark) Victor Jensen	3
6.	(Spain) Miguel Rodríguez	3
9.	(England) Adrian Blake	2
9.	(Netherlands) Mike van der Hoorn	2
9.	(Denmark) Niklas Vesterlund	2
12.	(Germany) Can Bozdoğan	1
12.	(Ivory Coast) Sébastien Haller	1
12.	(Netherlands) Nick Viergever	1
Totals		39

(Netherlands) KNVB Cup

No.	Name	
1.	(United States) Paxten Aaronson	2
1.	(Belgium) Siebe Horemans	2
1.	(Netherlands) David Min	2
4.	(France) Yoann Cathline	1
4.	(Spain) Miguel Rodríguez	1
Totals		8

== Monthly awards ==
Month	Type of award	Player	Ref.
October	Johan Cruyff Talent of the Month	(Denmark) Oscar Fraulo	
October	Team of the Month	(Netherlands) Nick Viergever	
November	Johan Cruyff Talent of the Month	(United States) Paxten Aaronson	
November	Team of the Month	(United States) Paxten Aaronson	
December	Team of the Month	(Iraq) Zidane Iqbal	
February	Team of the Month	(Greece) Vasilis Barkas	
March	Team of the Month	(Iraq) Zidane Iqbal	
March	Team of the Month	(Morocco) Souffian El Karouani	
April	VI Player of the Month	(Spain) Miguel Rodríguez	
April	Player of the Month	(Spain) Miguel Rodríguez	
April	Team of the Month	(France) Yoann Cathline	
April	Team of the Month	(Ivory Coast) Sébastien Haller	
April	Team of the Month	(Morocco) Souffian El Karouani	
April	Team of the Month	(Spain) Miguel Rodríguez	

== Attendance ==
=== Home games ===
Round	Opponent	Attendance	Total attendance	Average
Friendlies
N/A	(Netherlands) USV Elinkwijk	1,761 (Note: Match played at Sportpark Elinkwijk.)	1,761	1,761
N/A	(Denmark) Silkeborg IF	0 (Note: Behind closed doors.) (Note: Match played at Sportpark de Bilderberg.)	1,761	1,761
N/A	(Qatar) Al-Rayyan SC	Unknown	1,761	1,761
N/A	(France) RC Lens	0	1,761	1,761
N/A	(Italy) Venezia FC	3,825 (Note: Match played at Stadion Galgenwaard.)	5,586	2,793
N/A	(Netherlands) Sparta Rotterdam	0	5,586	2,793
N/A	(Netherlands) Heracles Almelo	0 (Note: Match played at FC Utrecht Topsportcentrum.)	5,586	2,793
N/A	(Netherlands) Vitesse	0	5,586	2,793
N/A	(Netherlands) Willem II	0 (Note: Match played at KNVB Campus.)	5,586	2,793
Eredivisie
1	PEC Zwolle	0	0	0
4	FC Twente	19,463	19,463	19,463
6	Willem II	20,861	40,324	20,162
8	RKC Waalwijk	22,019	62,343	20,781
10	Feyenoord	22,396	84,739	21,185
12	Heracles Almelo	22,031	106,770	21,354
14	PSV	22,479	129,249	21,542
16	Go Ahead Eagles	19,676	148,925	21,275
17	Fortuna Sittard	21,882	170,807	21,351
19	AZ	22,348	193,155	21,462
22	Almere City FC	21,478	214,633	21,463
24	NAC Breda	22,348	236,981	21,544
26	N.E.C.	22,532	259,513	21,626
27	sc Heerenveen	22,366	281,879	21,683
29	FC Groningen	22,711	304,590	21,756
31	Ajax	22,516	327,106	21,807
33	Sparta Rotterdam	22,351	349,457	21,841

=== Away supporters ===
Round	Opponent	Attendance	Total attendance	Average
Eredivisie
2	sc Heerenveen	666	666	666
3	NAC Breda	700	1,366	683
7	AZ	726	2,092	697
9	FC Groningen	960	3,052	763
11	Sparta Rotterdam	500	3,552	710
13	N.E.C.	500	4,052	675
5	Ajax	1,000	5,052	722
15	Almere City FC	400	5,452	682
18	Feyenoord	1,000	6,452	717
20	Heracles Almelo	500	6,952	695
21	PEC Zwolle	500	7,452	677
23	PSV	1,150	8,602	717
25	Willem II	600	9,202	708
28	Go Ahead Eagles	400	9,602	686
30	RKC Waalwijk	600	10,202	680
32	FC Twente	1,000	11,202	700
34	Fortuna Sittard	1,000	12,202	718
KNVB Cup
First round	FC Lisse	400	400	400
Second round	AFC	0	400	400
Round of 16	RKC Waalwijk	600	1,000	500
Quarter-final	Heracles Almelo	500	1,500	500
