= Tom de Graaff =

Dutch football player (born 2004)

Personal information
- Full name: Tom Gerard de Graaff
- Date of birth: 10 December 2004 (age 21)
- Place of birth: Amsterdam, Netherlands
- Height: 1.90 m (6 ft 3 in)
- Position: Goalkeeper

Team information
- Current team: PEC Zwolle (on loan from Utrecht)
- Number: 16

Youth career
- 2015–2022: Ajax

Senior career*
Years	Team	Apps	(Gls)
2022–2024	Ajax	0	(0)
2022–2024	Jong Ajax	40	(0)
2024–	Utrecht	0	(0)
2024–	Jong Utrecht	22	(0)
2025–	→ PEC Zwolle (loan)	31	(0)

International career^{‡}
2021	Netherlands U18	2	(0)
2025–	Netherlands U21	2	(0)
- * Club domestic league appearances and goals as of 21 May 2026 ‡ National team caps and goals as of 14 November 2025

Tom Gerard de Graaff (born 10 December 2004) is a Dutch professional footballer who plays as a goalkeeper for club PEC Zwolle on loan from Utrecht.

== Club career ==
De Graaff joined the Ajax academy in 2015. In September, 2021 de Graaff signed a contract with Ajax to take him into the summer of 2024 with the club. In July, 2022 he was included in the Ajax first team's pre-season training camp to Austria. De Graaff made his debut for Jong Ajax in the Eerste Divisie on 22 August 2022 at home against De Graafschap.

On 19 June 2024, de Graaff signed with Utrecht.

On 2 August 2025, de Graaff was loaned by PEC Zwolle for the 2025–26 season, with an option to buy.

== International career ==
In September 2022 De Graaff was called up to the Dutch U19 squad for matches against Slovenia, Northern Ireland, and Moldova.

== Career statistics ==
As of match played 10 May 2026.

Appearances and goals by club, season and competition
Club	Season	League			Cup		Europe		Other		Total	
Club	Season	Division	Apps	Goals	Apps	Goals	Apps	Goals	Apps	Goals	Apps	Goals
Ajax	2022–23	Eredivisie	0	0	0	0	—		—		0	0
Ajax	2023–24	Eredivisie	0	0	0	0	0	0	0	0	0	0
Ajax	Total		0	0	0	0	0	0	0	0	0	0
Jong Ajax	2022–23	Eerste Divisie	25	0	—		—		—		25	0
Jong Ajax	2023–24	Eerste Divisie	15	0	—		—		—		15	0
Jong Ajax	Total		40	0	—		—		—		40	0
Utrecht	2024–25	Eredivisie	0	0	0	0	—		—		0	0
Jong Utrecht	2024–25	Eerste Divisie	22	0	—		—		—		22	0
PEC Zwolle (loan)	2025–26	Eredivisie	31	0	2	0	—		—		33	0
Career total			93	0	2	0	0	0	0	0	95	0
