= Gibson Yah =

Dutch footballer (born 2003)

Personal information
- Full name: Gibson Osahumen Yah
- Date of birth: 27 September 2003 (age 23)
- Place of birth: Heerenveen, Netherlands
- Height: 1.93 m (6 ft 4 in)
- Position: Midfielder

Team information
- Current team: Bristol City
- Number: 27

Youth career
- –2014: DVC Buiksloot
- 2014–2022: Ajax

Senior career*
Years	Team	Apps	(Gls)
2021–2022	Jong Ajax	19	(0)
2022–2025	Jong Utrecht	55	(0)
2025–2026	Volendam	24	(0)
2026–	Bristol City	0	(0)

International career^{‡}
2017–2018	Netherlands U15	3	(1)
- * Club domestic league appearances and goals as of 19 May 2026 ‡ National team caps and goals as of 11:44, 8 January 2021 (UTC)

Gibson Osahumen Yah (born 27 September 2003) is a Dutch footballer who plays as a midfielder for EFL Championship club Bristol City.

== Club career ==
=== Early career ===
Yah played in the youth academy of DVC Buiksloot until 2014, after which he joined Ajax' academy. He made his professional debut for Jong Ajax on 5 January 2021, in a 1–0 away loss to TOP Oss, coming on as a substitute for Kian Fitz-Jim in the 81st minute.

On 28 May 2022, Yah moved to Jong FC Utrecht.

=== FC Volendam ===
On 22 June 2025, Yah signed a two-season contract with Volendam.

=== Bristol City ===
On 26 June 2026, Yah signed a four-year contract with English Championship club Bristol City.

== International career ==
Born in the Netherlands, Yah is of Nigerian descent through his parents. He is a youth international for the Netherlands, having gained three caps for the Netherlands under-15s.

== Style of play ==
Known for his strong tackling, passing ability, and a willingness to shoot from distance. A right-footed holding midfielder, he often operates as a central pivot, combining defensive duties with an ability to create opportunities

== Career statistics ==
As of match played 13 September 2024

Appearances and goals by club, season and competition
Club	Season	League			Cup		Europe		Other		Total	
Club	Season	Division	Apps	Goals	Apps	Goals	Apps	Goals	Apps	Goals	Apps	Goals
Jong Ajax	2020–21	Eerste Divisie	7	0	—		—		—		7	0
Jong Ajax	2021–22	Eerste Divisie	12	0	—		—		—		12	0
Jong Ajax	Total		19	0	—		—		—		19	0
Jong Utrecht	2020–21	Eerste Divisie	11	0	—		—		—		11	0
Jong Utrecht	2023–24	Eerste Divisie	23	0	—		—		—		23	0
Jong Utrecht	2024–25	Eerste Divisie	5	0	—		—		—		5	0
Jong Utrecht	Total		39	0	—		—		—		39	0
Career total			58	0	—		—		—		58	0
