= Björn Hardley =

Dutch footballer (born 2002)

Personal information
- Full name: Björn Bryan Hardley
- Date of birth: 19 December 2002 (age 23)
- Place of birth: Tilburg, Netherlands
- Height: 1.89 m (6 ft 2 in)
- Position: Defender

Team information
- Current team: Dordrecht
- Number: 4

Youth career
- 2008–2013: Advendo
- 2013–2014: RKVV DIA
- 2014–2019: NAC
- 2019–2023: Manchester United

Senior career*
Years	Team	Apps	(Gls)
2021–2023	Manchester United	0	(0)
2023–2024	Jong Utrecht	19	(0)
2024–2026	TSV Hartberg	2	(0)
2024–2025	TSV Hartberg II	11	(1)
2026–	Dordrecht	6	(0)
- * Club domestic league appearances and goals as of 1 October 2026

Björn Bryan Hardley (born 19 December 2002) is a Dutch professional footballer who plays as a defender for Eerste Divisie club Dordrecht.

== Club career ==
=== Early career ===
Born in Tilburg, Hardley started his career with local sides SV Advendo and RKVV DIA, before joining NAC Breda in 2014. While at NAC, Hardley's performances caught the eye of Manchester United scout Rene Moonen, who invited four other United scouts to watch Hardley in action.

=== Manchester United ===
After impressing scouts, Hardley signed a three-year contract with English club Manchester United in 2019. He progressed through the ranks at United, establishing himself in the under-18 squad before moving to the under-23 side. He made three appearances in the 2021–22 EFL Trophy, scoring once in a 3–2 defeat to Lincoln City.

Having trained with the first team since November 2021, Hardley was added to Manchester United's Champions League squad in early December.

=== Utrecht ===
On 20 July 2023, Hardley's departure from Manchester United was confirmed by the club as he had joined Dutch club Utrecht. He was the second player from Manchester United to join the club in the summer transfer window, following Zidane Iqbal. He was moved to the club's reserve team, Jong Utrecht, for the 2023–24 season. His debut came on 21 August 2023, coming on as a substitute in the 90th minute, in a 1–0 victory over FC Groningen. His first start for the club came a month later on 22 September, in a 3–2 victory over Cambuur.

=== TSV Hartberg ===
On 5 September 2024, Hardley signed for Austrian Bundesliga club TSV Hartberg on a two-year contract.

=== Dordrecht ===
On 8 January 2026, Hardley joined Dordrecht on a one-and-a-half-year contract.

== International career ==
Hardley is eligible to represent the Netherlands and Suriname.

== Career statistics ==
=== Club ===
As of match played 23 August 2024

Appearances and goals by club, season and competition
Club	Season	League			National cup		League cup		Europe		Other		Total	
Club	Season	Division	Apps	Goals	Apps	Goals	Apps	Goals	Apps	Goals	Apps	Goals	Apps	Goals
Manchester United U21	2020–21	—	—		—		—		—		0	0	0	0
Manchester United U21	2021–22	—	—		—		—		—		3 (Note: Appearance(s) in the EFL Trophy)	1	3	1
Manchester United U21	2022–23	—	—		—		—		—		5	0	5	0
Manchester United U21	Total		—		—		—		—		8	1	8	1
Jong Utrecht	2023–24	Eerste Divisie	16	0	—		—		—		—		16	0
Jong Utrecht	2024–25	Eerste Divisie	3	0	—		—		—		—		3	0
Jong Utrecht	Total		19	0	—		—		—		—		19	0
Career total			19	0	0	0	0	0	0	0	8	1	27	1
