= Miliano Jonathans =

Indonesian footballer (born 2004)

Personal information
- Date of birth: 5 April 2004 (age 22)
- Place of birth: Arnhem, Netherlands
- Height: 1.78 m (5 ft 10 in)
- Positions: Right winger; attacking midfielder

Team information
- Current team: Utrecht
- Number: 26

Youth career
- –2014: Arnhemse Boys
- 2014–2021: Vitesse

Senior career*
Years	Team	Apps	(Gls)
2022–2025	Vitesse	38	(11)
2025–	Utrecht	15	(0)
2025–	Jong Utrecht	7	(1)
2026	→ Excelsior (loan)	9	(2)

International career^{‡}
2025–	Indonesia	4	(0)
- * Club domestic league appearances and goals as of 6 March 2026 ‡ National team caps and goals as of 11 October 2025

Miliano Jonathans (born 5 April 2004) is a professional footballer who plays as a right winger or attacking midfielder for Eredivisie club Utrecht. Born in the Netherlands, he represents the Indonesia national team.

== Club career ==
=== Vitesse ===
Jonathans joined the youth system of Vitesse at the age of 10. He made his Eredivisie debut for Vitesse on 24 April 2022 in a game against Willem II. On 31 August 2022, Jonathans signed a new contract with Vitesse until 2025.

=== Utrecht ===
On 1 January 2025, Jonathans joined Utrecht for an estimated fee of €300,000.

==== Loan to Excelsior ====
On 16 January 2026, Jonathans joined Excelsior on loan until the end of the season.

== International career ==
In August 2025, it was announced that Jonathans had decided to represent Indonesia at international level. On 3 September 2025, he received a call-up from Indonesia national team for two friendlies against Chinese Taipei and Lebanon. On 5 September 2025, he made his debut in a friendlies match against Chinese Taipei in a 6–0 win.

== Personal life ==
Born in the Netherlands, Jonathans is of Indonesian descent. He has Indonesian ancestry through his paternal grandfather, Willem Maximilian Jonathans. His grandfather was born in Depok after Indonesian independence. His ancestors were descendants of the Depok Dutch (Indonesian: Belanda Depok; mixed descent of native Indonesians and Dutch) ethnic group based on the surname Jonathans that he was given.

On 3 September 2025, Jonathans officially obtained Indonesian citizenship.

== Career statistics ==
=== Club ===
As of match played 6 March 2026

Appearances and goals by club, season and competition
Club	Season	League			KNVB Cup		Europe		Other		Total	
Club	Season	Division	Apps	Goals	Apps	Goals	Apps	Goals	Apps	Goals	Apps	Goals
Vitesse	2021–22	Eredivisie	2	0	0	0	0	0	—		2	0
Vitesse	2022–23	Eredivisie	12	0	0	0	—		—		12	0
Vitesse	2023–24	Eredivisie	6	0	1	0	—		—		7	0
Vitesse	2024–25	Eerste Divisie	18	11	1	0	—		—		19	11
Vitesse	Total		38	11	2	0	0	0	0	0	40	11
Utrecht	2024–25	Eredivisie	8	0	2	0	0	0	—		10	0
Utrecht	2025–26	Eredivisie	7	0	1	0	6 (Note: Appearances in UEFA Europa League)	0	—		14	0
Utrecht	Total		15	0	3	0	6	0	0	0	24	0
Jong Utrecht	2024–25	Eerste Divisie	2	0	—		—		—		2	0
Jong Utrecht	2025–26	Eerste Divisie	5	1	—		—		—		5	1
Jong Utrecht	Total		7	1	—		—		0	0	7	1
Excelsior (loan)	2025–26	Eredivisie	9	2	0	0	—		—		9	2
Career total			69	14	5	0	6	0	0	0	80	14

=== International ===
As of match played 11 October 2025

Appearances and goals by national team and year
National team	Year	Apps	Goals
Indonesia	2025	4	0
Total		4	0

== See also ==
- List of Indonesia international footballers born outside Indonesia
