= Lars Mol =

Dutch footballer (born 2004)

Personal information
- Date of birth: 15 September 2004 (age 22)
- Place of birth: Waalwijk, Netherlands
- Height: 1.85 m (6 ft 1 in)
- Position: Midfielder

Team information
- Current team: TOP Oss
- Number: 28

Youth career
- –2015: VV DESK
- 2015–2023: NAC Breda

Senior career*
Years	Team	Apps	(Gls)
2023–2026	NAC Breda	8	(0)
2025–2026	→ TOP Oss (loan)	29	(0)
2026–	TOP Oss	0	(0)
- * Club domestic league appearances and goals as of 24 April 2026

Lars Mol (born 15 September 2004) is a Dutch professional footballer who plays as a midfielder for Eerste Divisie club TOP Oss.

== Career ==
Mol was scouted by NAC Breda while playing for VV DESK in Kaatsheuvel. He joined NAC Breda's youth academy in 2015 and progressed through the club's youth system.

He made his first-team debut for NAC Breda on 18 August 2024 in a 2–1 match against Ajax. He came on as a late substitute for Dominik Janošek. On 27 August 2024, he signed his first professional contract with the club.

On 30 October 2024, Mol scored his first goal for NAC Breda in a KNVB Cup first-round match against BVV Barendrecht. He scored the equaliser in the 50th minute from an assist by Saná Fernandes, although NAC eventually lost 2–1 after a late goal by Brent Vugts.

== Career statistics ==
Appearances and goals by club, season and competition
Club	Season	League			KNVB Beker		Total	
Club	Season	Division	Apps	Goals	Apps	Goals	Apps	Goals
NAC Breda	2024–25	Eredivisie	7	0	1	1	8	1
Career total			7	0	1	1	8	1
