= Georgios Charalampoglou =

Greek footballer (born 2004)

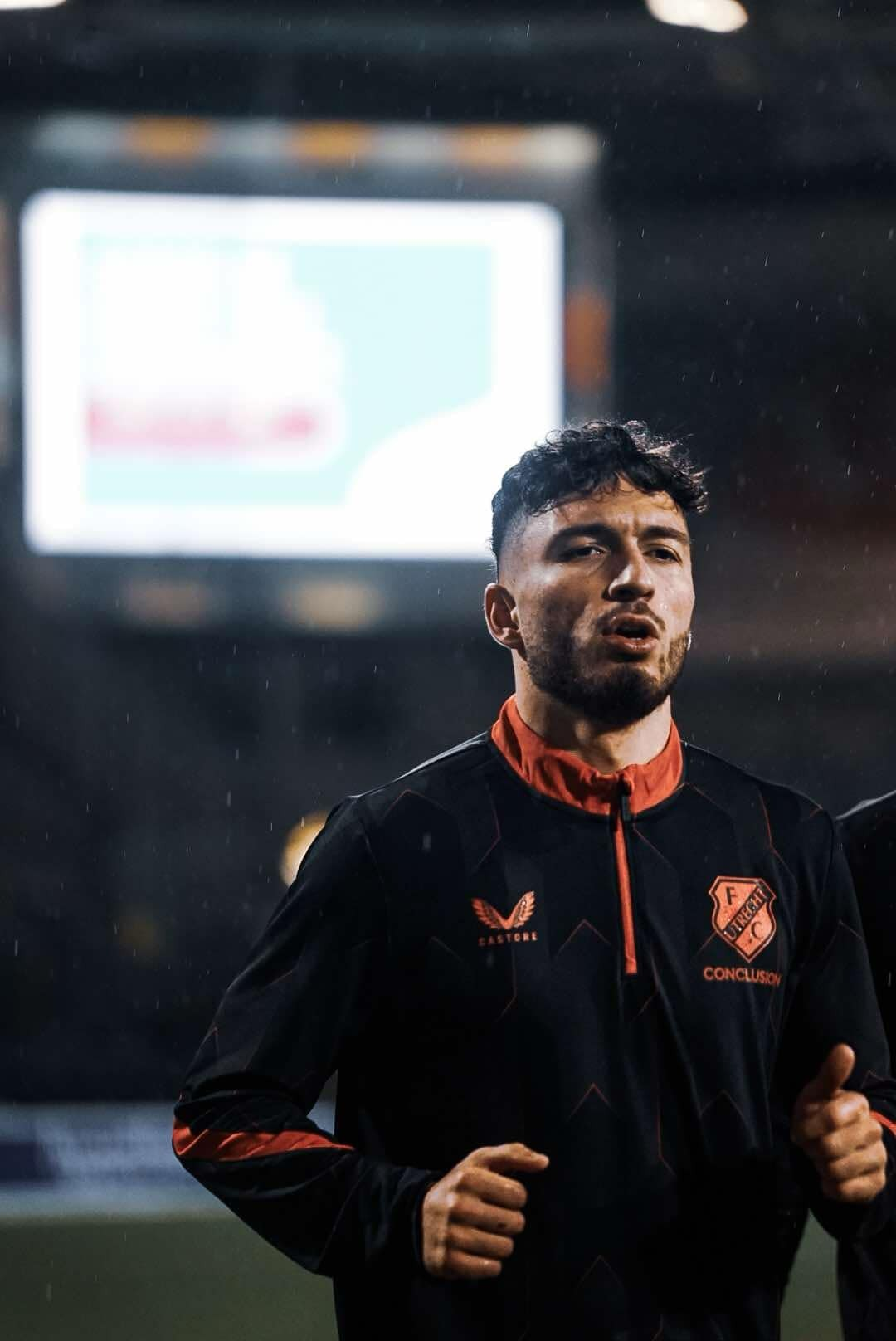
- Charalampoglou with Jong Utrecht in 2025

Personal information
- Full name: Georgios Charalampoglou
- Date of birth: 5 November 2004 (age 22)
- Place of birth: Evosmos, Thessaloniki, Greece
- Height: 1.78 m (5 ft 10 in)
- Position: Striker

Team information
- Current team: Volos
- Number: 49

Youth career
- 2010–2020: Niki Efkarpias
- 2020–2022: Fiorentina
- 2022–2024: Olympiacos

Senior career*
Years	Team	Apps	(Gls)
2022–2024	Olympiacos B	1	(0)
2024–2025	Jong Utrecht	31	(5)
2025–2026	Asteras Tripolis	10	(1)
2026–	Volos	5	(1)
- * Club domestic league appearances and goals as of 20 September 2026

Georgios Charalampoglou (Greek: Γεώργιος Χαραλαμπόγλου; born 5 November 2004) is a Greek professional footballer who plays as a striker for Super League club Volos.

== Career ==
Charalampoglou was born on 5 November 2004 in Evosmos, Thessaloniki, Greece. He started playing football at the age of five, initially for Niki Efkarpias.

Charalampoglou joined Italian club Fiorentina's under-17 team in 2020, later progressing to the club's under-18 squad for the 2021–22 season, where he scored 5 goals and provided 3 assists. In 2023, he returned to Greece to sign with Olympiacos' reserves Olympiacos B. On 18 June 2023, he made his professional debut for the team in a 4–2 Super League Greece 2 loss to Chania, replacing Anastasios Sapountzis in the 71st minute. During the 2023–24 season, he played for Olympiacos' under-19s, where he scored 28 goals and provided 15 assists in 38 appearances.He also won 2 Championships and he made it to be the top scorer of the League.

On 20 June 2024, Charalampoglou signed a two-year contract with Dutch side FC Utrecht and was assigned to their reserve team Jong FC Utrecht competing in the second-tier Eerste Divisie.

== Style of play ==
Charalampoglou mainly operates as a striker. He is known for his dribbling ability, movement without the ball and easy scoring.

== Personal life ==
Charalampoglou is a native of Thessaloniki, Greece. He has regarded Sweden international Zlatan Ibrahimović and Portugal international Cristiano Ronaldo as his football idols.

== Career statistics ==
As of match played 10 April 2025

Appearances and goals by club, season and competition
Club	Season	League				National cup		Europe		Other		Total		
Club	Season	Division	Apps	Goals	Assists	Apps	Goals	Apps	Goals	Apps	Goals	Apps	Goals	Assists
Fiorentina U17	2020-2021	Serie A U17	6	0	0							6	0	0
Fiorentina U18	2021-2022	Serie A U18	20	5	3							20	5	3
Olympiacos B	2022–23	Super League Greece 2	1	0	0	—		—		—		1	0	0
Olympiacos U19	2022-2023	Super League Greece U19	13	10	4							13	10	4
Olympiacos U19	2023-2024	Super League Greece U19	25	18	11							25	18	11
Jong Utrecht	2024–25	Eerste Divisie	25	5	0	—		—		—		25	5	0
Career total			90	38	18	—		—		—		90	38	18
