= Nazjir Held =

Curaçaoan association football player (born 2005)

Personal information
- Date of birth: 2 September 2005 (age 21)
- Place of birth: Willemstad, Curaçao
- Height: 1.80 m (5 ft 11 in)
- Position: Defender

Team information
- Current team: RKC Waalwijk
- Number: 55

Youth career
- 2015–2023: FC Utrecht

Senior career*
Years	Team	Apps	(Gls)
2023–2025	Jong Utrecht	72	(2)
2024–2025	Utrecht	1	(0)
2025–	RKC Waalwijk	29	(4)
- * Club domestic league appearances and goals as of 25 April 2026

Nazjir Held (born 2 September 2005) is a Curaçaoan professional footballer who plays as a defender for Eerste Divisie club RKC Waalwijk.

== Career ==
Born in Curaçao, Held started playing football at the Curaçao club Excellence. In 2015, he moved to the Netherlands and played in the youth academy of FC Utrecht after being identified as a nine-year-old.

He scored his first goal in the Eerste Divisie for Jong FC Utrecht on 25 August 2023 against VVV Venlo. He signed a new three-year professional contract with the club in September 2023.

He made his debut in the Eredivisie for FC Utrecht on 7 April 2024 in an 3–2 away win against SC Heerenveen.

On 2 September 2025, Held signed a four-year contract with RKC Waalwijk.
