= Neal Viereck =

Dutch footballer

Personal information
- Full name: Neal Roëll Viereck
- Date of birth: 3 May 2004 (age 22)
- Place of birth: Amsterdam, Netherlands
- Height: 1.95 m (6 ft 5 in)
- Position: Centre-back

Team information
- Current team: Tenerife (on loan from FC Utrecht)
- Number: 23

Youth career
- 2010–2011: GeuzenMiddenmeer
- 2011–2012: Diemen
- 2012–2023: Ajax

Senior career*
Years	Team	Apps	(Gls)
2022–2023	Jong Ajax	2	(0)
2023–	Jong Utrecht	71	(4)
2026–	→ Tenerife (loan)	0	(0)
- * Club domestic league appearances and goals as of 28 April 2026

Neal Roëll Viereck (born 3 May 2004) is a Dutch professional footballer who plays as a defender for Segunda División club Tenerife, on loan from FC Utrecht.

== Early life ==
He joined the Ajax Youth Academy as a youngster. However, his progress as a young player was not linear, and whilst transitioning his playing time between Ajax under-13 and their under-14 set-up, Viereck suffered from a number of injuries. This could well have been linked to a growth spurt he had that saw his grow by 4 cm in a single season.

== Career ==
=== Ajax ===
Viereck made his professional debut for Jong Ajax on 11 December 2022 against Jong Utrecht in the Eerste Divisie.

Viereck received unfortunate worldwide press coverage when he was sent-off playing for Jong Ajax against De Graafschap on 13 January 2023, just 30 seconds after appearing on the pitch as a substitute. He entered the field of play in the 59th minute as a replacement for Jorrel Hato, but was immediately dismissed in the 60th minute with a straight red card for a professional foul on Camiel Neghli by referee Luuk Timmer. The event was reported as unusual and of a comical nature worldwide, including in Ecuador, Portugal, Peru, Argentina, and Bosnia. It was only his second professional appearance. An appeal against the red card by the club was unsuccessful and Viereck's red card was upheld and he served suspension.

=== Utrecht ===
On 19 July 2023, Viereck signed a two-year contract with Utrecht and was assigned to Jong Utrecht. He made his league debut for the club as a starter on 18 September 2023 in an away 2–0 loss to FC Emmen in the Eerste Divisie. Later captaining the side, he scored his first league goal for the club securing a late equaliser in a 1–1 draw against Roda JC on 1 November 2025.

==== Loan to Tenerife ====
On 17 July 2026, Viereck was loaned to Segunda División side Tenerife, for one year.
