= Yannick Leliendal =

Surinamese footballer (born 2002)

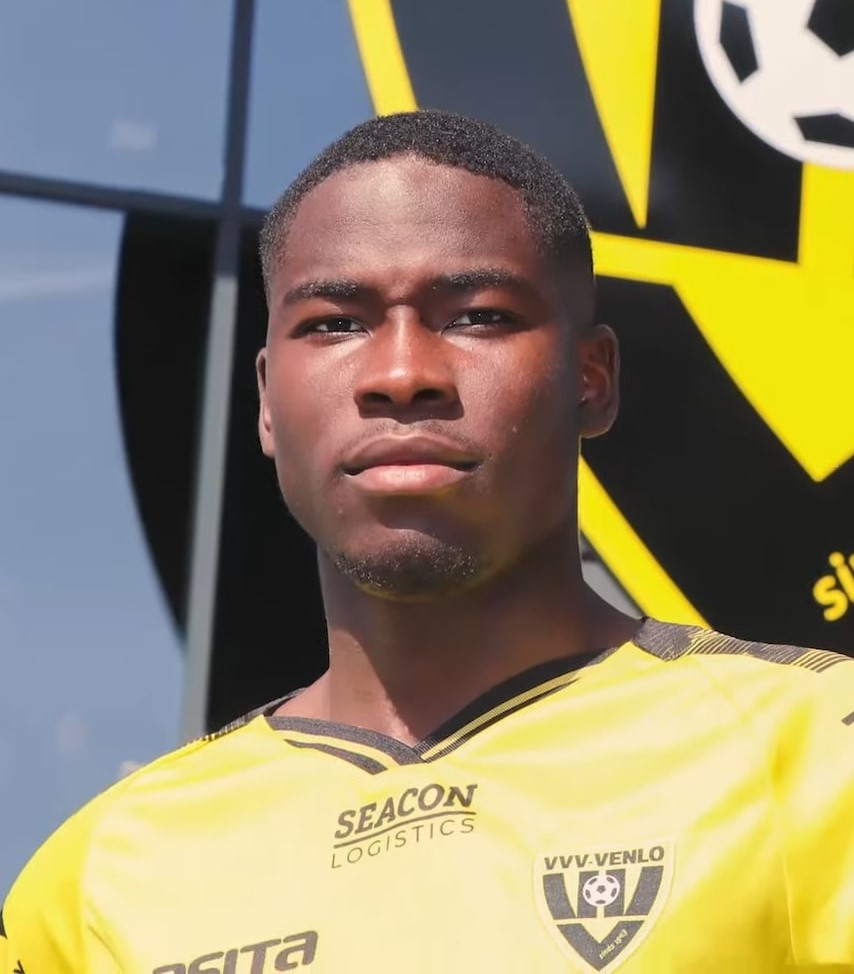
- Leliendal in 2021

Personal information
- Full name: Yannick Cereso Frederik Leliendal
- Date of birth: 23 April 2002 (age 24)
- Place of birth: Amsterdam, Netherlands
- Height: 1.69 m (5 ft 7 in)
- Position: Left back

Team information
- Current team: Hapoel Tel Aviv
- Number: 32

Youth career
- –2014: Tongeren
- 2014–2020: Genk

Senior career*
Years	Team	Apps	(Gls)
2021–2022	VVV-Venlo	7	(0)
2022	→ TOP Oss (loan)	14	(0)
2022–2024	Jong Utrecht	40	(1)
2022–2024	Utrecht	8	(0)
2024–2026	Volendam	69	(2)
2026–	Hapoel Tel Aviv	1	(0)

International career^{‡}
2017–2018	Belgium U16	10	(1)
2018	Belgium U17	2	(0)
2019	Netherlands U17	1	(0)
2019	Netherlands U18	3	(0)
2025–	Suriname	4	(0)
- * Club domestic league appearances and goals as of 18 September 2026 ‡ National team caps and goals as of 5 October 2026

Yannick Cereso Frederik Leliendal (born 23 April 2002) is a professional footballer who plays as a left back for Israeli Premier League club Hapoel Tel Aviv. Born in the Netherlands and raised in Belgium, he plays for the Suriname national team.

== Early life ==
Leliendal was born in the Netherlands to Surinamese parents, but grew up in Belgium. He started at KSK Tongeren before he joined the youth academy of KRC Genk in 2014.

== Club career ==
=== VVV ===
Following a successful trial period with VVV-Venlo he signed a two-year contract on 16 July 2021. On 8 August 2021 in the first league match of the season against NAC Breda he made his professional debut in a 2–2 draw. Leliendal scored his first goal for VVV on 26 October 2021 against NAC Brada in the KNVB Cup. At the end of January 2022 transfer window he was loaned for the rest of the season to TOP Oss. Leliendal commented that this move was a success and he was able to get playing minutes and was able to develop as a player.

=== Utrecht ===
He signed a one-year contract with an option for an additional season with Jong Utrecht in July 2022 after being released by VVV. He scored his first goal in a 4–1 win over NAC Breda on February 20, 2023.

=== Volendam ===
On 11 July 2024, Leliendal signed with FC Volendam for one season, with an optional second year. On 10 November 2025, he extended his contract with Volendam by two seasons, keeping him at the club until mid-2028.

=== Hapoel Tel Aviv ===
On 31 August 2026, Leliendal moved to Israel and signed a three-year contract with Hapoel Tel Aviv.

== International career ==
Leliendal holds Surinamese, Dutch and Belgian nationalities. He has played for both the Belgian and Dutch national youth teams in age group football. He initially represented Belgium, from 2017 to 2018, winning 10 caps with the national under-16 team and two with the under-17 side – all of these 12 matches being friendly. In 2019, he made an official appearance for the Netherlands national under-17 team, being part of the squad that reached the semifinals at the 2019 FIFA U-17 World Cup in Brazil.

In May 2025, Leliendal was called up by the Suriname national football team for the 2026 FIFA World Cup qualification matches against Puerto Rico and El Salvador. On 11 June 2025, his request to switch international allegiance to Suriname was approved by FIFA.
