= Aurelio Oehlers =

Dutch footballer

Personal information
- Date of birth: 5 February 2004 (age 22)
- Place of birth: Almere, Netherlands
- Height: 1.72 m (5 ft 8 in)
- Position: Winger

Team information
- Current team: Luzern
- Number: 7

Youth career
- Sporting Almere
- –2016: ASC Waterwijk
- 2016–2017: Ajax
- 2017–2020: Utrecht

Senior career*
Years	Team	Apps	(Gls)
2020–2024	Jong Utrecht	44	(3)
2024–2026	Volendam	60	(10)
2026–	Luzern	2	(0)

International career
2019	Netherlands U15	2	(0)
2019–2020	Netherlands U16	5	(1)
- * Club domestic league appearances and goals as of 2 August 2026

Aurelio Oehlers (born 5 February 2004) is a Dutch footballer who plays as a winger for Swiss Super League club Luzern.

== Career ==
Oehlers played youth football for Sporting Almere, ASC Waterwijk and Ajax. In 2017, he moved to the FC Utrecht academy, where he in 2019 signed his first professional contract as a 15-year-old, keeping him at the club until 2023. He made his debut in professional football for Jong FC Utrecht in the Eerste Divisie on 19 December 2020, in the 3–1 away loss to De Graafschap, coming on as a substitute in the 80th minute for Tim Pieters. On 30 April 2021, Oehlers scored his first goal in a 4–0 league win over TOP Oss.

On 29 July 2024, Oehlers signed a three-year contract with FC Volendam.

== Career statistics ==
As of 27 October 2021.

Club	Season	League			Cup		Other		Total	
Club	Season	Division	Apps	Goals	Apps	Goals	Apps	Goals	Apps	Goals
Jong Utrecht	2020–21	Eerste Divisie	6	1	–		0	0	2	0
Jong Utrecht	2021–22	Eerste Divisie	0	0	–		0	0	0	0
Career total			6	1	0	0	0	0	6	1
