= Calvin Raatsie =

Dutch footballer (born 2002)

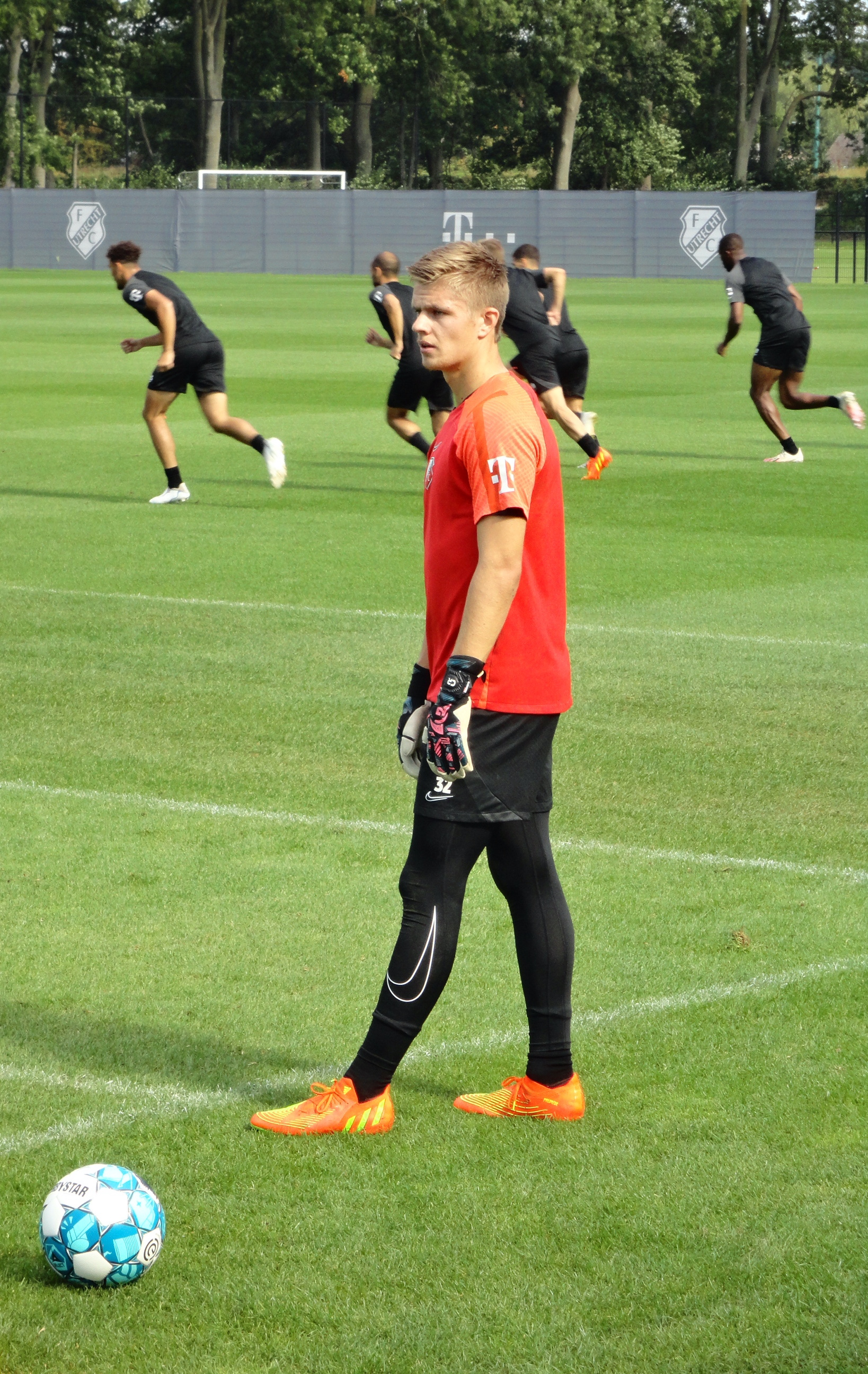
- Raatsie with Utrecht in 2022

Personal information
- Full name: Calvin Owen Harm Raatsie
- Date of birth: 9 February 2002 (age 24)
- Place of birth: Purmerend, Netherlands
- Height: 1.88 m (6 ft 2 in)
- Position: Goalkeeper

Team information
- Current team: Dordrecht
- Number: 1

Youth career
- 2010–2012: EVC Edam
- 2012–2013: RKAV Volendam
- 2013–2020: Ajax

Senior career*
Years	Team	Apps	(Gls)
2020–2022	Jong Ajax	13	(0)
2022–2024	Jong Utrecht	22	(0)
2024	→ Roda JC (loan)	17	(0)
2024–2026	Excelsior	37	(0)
2026–	Dordrecht	6	(0)

International career
2017	Netherlands U15	3	(0)
2017–2018	Netherlands U16	6	(0)
2018–2019	Netherlands U17	20	(0)
2019	Netherlands U18	1	(0)
2023–2025	Netherlands U21	8	(0)
Medal record
Men's football
Representing Netherlands
UEFA European Under-17 Championship
Winner	2019 Ireland
- * Club domestic league appearances and goals as of 11 September 2026

Calvin Owen Harm Raatsie (born 9 February 2002) is a Dutch professional footballer who plays as a goalkeeper for Eerste Divisie club Dordrecht.

== Club career ==
A youth academy graduate of Ajax, Raatsie made his professional debut for club's reserve side Jong Ajax on 15 February 2021 in a 2–1 defeat against Dordrecht. He made an appearance on the bench for the senior team, but remained an unused substitute in a 3–1 win over VVV-Venlo on 13 May 2021.

On 27 May 2022, Raatsie signed a three-year contract with Utrecht. He made his debut for the reserve team, Jong Utrecht, on the first matchday of the 2022–23 Eerste Divisie, starting in a 3–0 loss to TOP Oss on 5 August. On 15 January 2024, he moved on loan to Roda JC.

On 16 July 2024, Raatsie joined Excelsior on a three-year contract. On 17 July 2026, he joined Dordrecht on a three-year contract.

== International career ==
Raatsie has represented the Netherlands in five different age group teams from under-15 to under-21. He was the first choice goalkeeper of under-17 team which won the 2019 UEFA European Under-17 Championship. He also played all matches at the 2019 FIFA U-17 World Cup, as Netherlands finished fourth in the tournament.

== Career statistics ==
As of match played 11 September 2026

Appearances and goals by club, season and competition
Club	Season	League			Cup		Other		Total	
Club	Season	Division	Apps	Goals	Apps	Goals	Apps	Goals	Apps	Goals
Jong Ajax	2020–21	Eerste Divisie	1	0	—		—		1	0
Jong Ajax	2021–22	Eerste Divisie	12	0	—		—		12	0
Jong Ajax	Total		13	0	0	0	0	0	13	0
Jong Utrecht	2022–23	Eerste Divisie	12	0	—		—		12	0
Jong Utrecht	2023–24	Eerste Divisie	10	0	—		—		10	0
Jong Utrecht	Total		22	0	0	0	0	0	22	0
Roda JC (loan)	2023–24	Eerste Divisie	17	0	—		1 (Note: Appearance in promotion/relegation play-offs)	0	18	0
Excelsior	2024–25	Eerste Divisie	35	0	2	0	—		37	0
Excelsior	2025–26	Eredivisie	2	0	1	0	—		3	0
Excelsior	Total		37	0	3	0	0	0	40	0
Dordrecht	2026–27	Eerste Divisie	6	0	0	0	—		6	0
Career total			95	0	3	0	1	0	99	0

== Honours ==
Netherlands U17

- UEFA European Under-17 Championship: 2019

Individual

- UEFA European Under-17 Championship Team of the Tournament: 2019
