= Rickson van Hees =

American soccer player (born 2002)

Personal information
- Date of birth: June 21, 2002 (age 24)
- Place of birth: Glendale, Arizona, United States
- Height: 5 ft 9 in (1.75 m)
- Position: Right-back

Team information
- Current team: CT United

Youth career
- 2010–2015: SC Del Sol
- 2015–2018: Vitesse
- 2018: RKVV Emplina
- 2018–2021: NEC Nijmegen
- 2021–2023: Twente/Heracles Almelo

Senior career*
Years	Team	Apps	(Gls)
2021	North Texas SC	1	(0)
2023–2025	Jong Utrecht	49	(0)
2023–2025	Utrecht	0	(0)
2026–	CT United	19	(0)

International career^{‡}
2019	United States U17	3	(0)
- * Club domestic league appearances and goals as of 1 August 2026 ‡ National team caps and goals as of May 29, 2021

Rickson van Hees (born June 21, 2002) is an American soccer player who plays as a right-back.

== Career ==
=== Youth ===
Van Hees played with local side SC Del Sol before moving to the Netherlands to join Vitesse in November 2015. He moved to NEC Nijmegen in 2018, going on to sign a professional contract with the club in 2019.

=== Professional ===
On April 20, 2021, van Hees returned to the United States to join USL League One side North Texas SC. He made his debut on May 29, 2021, starting against Toronto FC II. On August 12, 2021, van Hees and North Texas mutually agreed to part ways.

== Personal ==
Van Hees was born in Glendale, Arizona to a Dutch father and Mexican mother.
