= Anthony Descotte =

Belgian footballer (born 2003)

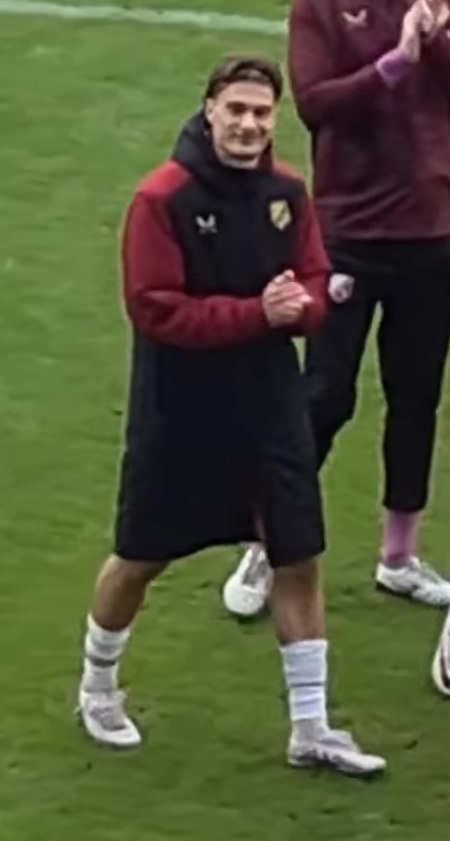
- Descotte in 2023

Personal information
- Full name: Anthony Kevin N Descotte
- Date of birth: 3 August 2003 (age 23)
- Height: 1.79 m (5 ft 10 in)
- Positions: Forward; right winger

Team information
- Current team: Fortuna Sittard (on loan from Charleroi)
- Number: 9

Youth career
- Standard Liège
- –2019: Anderlecht
- 2019–2021: Charleroi

Senior career*
Years	Team	Apps	(Gls)
2021–	Charleroi	22	(0)
2022–	Zébra Élites	2	(1)
2023–2025	→ Utrecht (loan)	22	(3)
2023–2025	→ Jong Utrecht (loan)	11	(5)
2025–2026	→ Volendam (loan)	14	(4)
2026–	→ Fortuna Sittard (loan)	11	(5)

International career^{‡}
2018	Belgium U15	1	(0)
2018–2019	Belgium U16	6	(3)
2019–2020	Belgium U17	7	(5)
2021–2022	Belgium U19	8	(4)
2022	Belgium U20	2	(2)
2022–2023	Belgium U21	4	(0)
- * Club domestic league appearances and goals as of 11:04, 17 November 2026 (UTC) ‡ National team caps and goals as of 21:57, 25 June 2023 (UTC)

Anthony Kevin N Descotte (born 3 August 2003) is a Belgian professional footballer who plays for Eredivisie club Fortuna Sittard, on loan from Pro League club Charleroi.

== Club career ==
He made his Belgian First Division A debut for Charleroi on 17 April 2021 in a game against Eupen.

On 31 January 2023, Descotte was loaned by Utrecht in the Netherlands until the end of the 2022–23 season, with an option to extend the loan for the 2023–24 season.

On 19 August 2025, Descotte returned to the Netherlands and joined Volendam on loan with an option to buy.
