= Joshua Mukeh =

Dutch footballer

Personal information
- Full name: Joshua Ebitonmo Mukeh
- Date of birth: 18 February 2003 (age 23)
- Place of birth: Utrecht, Netherlands
- Height: 1.85 m (6 ft 1 in)
- Position: Defender

Team information
- Current team: Emmen
- Number: 2

Youth career
- –2018: Ajax
- 2018–2021: Utrecht

Senior career*
Years	Team	Apps	(Gls)
2021–2025	Jong Utrecht	92	(1)
2022–2023	→ TOP Oss (loan)	15	(0)
2024–2025	Utrecht	0	(0)
2026–	Emmen	11	(1)
- * Club domestic league appearances and goals as of 28 April 2026

Joshua Ebitonmo Mukeh (born 18 February 2003) is a Dutch professional footballer who plays as a defender for Eerste Divisie club Emmen.

== Club career ==
Mukeh played in the youth academy of AFC Ajax and switched to FC Utrecht in 2018. On 2 April 2021, he made his debut for Jong FC Utrecht in a 2–3 win against Telstar.

In the 2022–23 season, Mukeh was loaned to TOP Oss.

In 2024, Mukeh was promoted to the first team of FC Utrecht, signing a three-year contract with the club.

On 3 February 2026, Mukeh signed a two-and-a-half-year contract with Emmen.
