= 2022–23 FC Utrecht season =

FC Utrecht
2022–23 season
- Owner: Frans van Seumeren Holding B.V. (99%); Stichting Beheer Aandelen FC Utrecht (1%)
- Chairman: Pieter Leyssius
- Head coach: Henk Fraser (until 14 December 2022); Michael Silberbauer (from 28 December 2022)
- Stadium: Stadion Galgenwaard
- Eredivisie: 7th
- KNVB Cup: Quarter-final
- Play-offs: Semi-final
- Top goalscorer: League: Anastasios Douvikas (19); All: Anastasios Douvikas (22)
- Highest home attendance: 22,065 (vs. FC Emmen, 28 May 2023)
- Lowest home attendance: 15,807 (vs. Vitesse, 11 September 2022)
- Average home league attendance: 19,769
- Biggest win: 0–4 (vs. FC Volendam, 12 November 2022)
- Biggest defeat: 6–1 (vs. PSV, 16 October 2022)
Home colours	Away colours	Third colours

The 2022–23 season was the 53rd season in the existence of FC Utrecht and the club's 53rd consecutive season in the top flight of Dutch football. In addition to the domestic league, FC Utrecht participated in this season's editions of the KNVB Cup. In the regular season, they qualified for the play-offs, for a place in the second round of the UEFA Europa Conference League.

== Players ==
=== First-team squad ===
As of 28 May 2023

Note: Flags indicate national team as defined under FIFA eligibility rules; some limited exceptions apply. Players may hold more than one non-FIFA nationality.

No.	Pos.	Nation	Player
1	GK	GRE	Vasilis Barkas (on loan from Celtic)
2	DF	NED	Mark van der Maarel
3	DF	NED	Tommy St. Jago
5	DF	NED	Hidde ter Avest
6	MF	GER	Can Bozdogan (on loan from FC Schalke 04)
7	MF	DEN	Victor Jensen
~~7~~	FW	NED	~~Daishawn Redan~~ (Note: Left during the season.) (~~on loan from Hertha BSC~~)
8	MF	NED	Luuk Brouwers
9	FW	GRE	Anastasios Douvikas
10	MF	USA	Taylor Booth
~~11~~	FW	MAR	~~Mimoun Mahi~~
11	FW	GER	Amin Younes (on loan from Ettifaq FC)
14	DF	NED	Ramon Hendriks (on loan from Feyenoord)
~~15~~	DF	NED	~~Djevencio van der Kust~~
16	GK	NED	Fabian de Keijzer
17	DF	SUR	Sean Klaiber
18	MF	NED	Jens Toornstra
19	FW	BEL	Anthony Descotte (on loan from RSC Charleroi)
~~19~~	MF	FRA	~~Albert Lottin~~
20	MF	MAR	Zakaria Labyad
~~20~~	FW	FRA	~~Arthur Zagre~~ (~~on loan from AS Monaco~~)

No.	Pos.	Nation	Player
21	DF	NED	Django Warmerdam
22	MF	NED	Sander van de Streek
23	MF	NED	Bart Ramselaar
24	DF	NED	Nick Viergever (captain)
25	DF	NED	Ruben Kluivert
26	MF	BEL	Othmane Boussaid
27	DF	FRA	Modibo Sagnan (on loan from Real Sociedad)
28	FW	NED	Bas Dost
~~29~~	FW	FRA	~~Moussa Sylla~~
30	FW	JPN	Naoki Maeda (on loan from Nagoya Grampus)
31	GK	NED	Thijmen Nijhuis
32	GK	NED	Calvin Raatsie
33	DF	NED	Mike van der Hoorn
34	DF	NED	Christopher Mamengi
37	FW	NED	Derensili Sanches Fernandes
38	MF	EST	Rocco Robert Shein
39	MF	NED	Lynden Edhart
39	FW	NED	Jesse van de Haar
~~46~~	DF	NED	~~Rick Meissen~~
51	GK	NED	Sep van der Heijden
61	GK	NED	Kevin Gadellaa

== Transfers ==
=== Summer ===
==== Transfers in ====
Nat.	Pos.	Player	Transferred from	Particularities	Ref.
(Netherlands) NED	MF	Luuk Brouwers	(Netherlands) Go Ahead Eagles	Purchased	
(Netherlands) NED	DF	Mike van der Hoorn	(Germany) Arminia Bielefeld	Purchase obligation	
(Estonia) EST	MF	Rocco Robert Shein	(Estonia) FC Flora	Buy option lifted	
(United States) USA	MF	Taylor Booth	(Germany) Bayern München II	Transfer free	
(Netherlands) NED	FW	Bas Dost	(Belgium) Club Brugge	Transfer free	
(Suriname) SUR	DF	Sean Klaiber	(Netherlands) Ajax	Transfer free	
(Netherlands) NED	GK	Calvin Raatsie	(Netherlands) Jong Ajax	Transfer free	
(Netherlands) NED	MF	Jens Toornstra	(Netherlands) Feyenoord	Transfer free	
(Netherlands) NED	DF	Nick Viergever	(Germany) Greuther Fürth	Transfer free	
(Greece) GRE	GK	Vasilis Barkas	(Scotland) Celtic	On loan	
(Germany) GER	MF	Can Bozdogan	(Germany) FC Schalke 04	On loan (+option to buy)	
(Netherlands) NED	DF	Ramon Hendriks	(Netherlands) Feyenoord	On loan (+option to buy with repurchase option)	
(Japan) JPN	FW	Naoki Maeda	(Japan) Nagoya Grampus	On loan (+option to buy)	
(Netherlands) NED	FW	Daishawn Redan	(Germany) Hertha BSC	On loan (+option to buy)	
(France) FRA	DF	Modibo Sagnan	(Spain) Real Sociedad	On loan (+option to buy, if lifted contract till 2026)	
(Germany) GER	FW	Amin Younes	(Saudi Arabia) Ettifaq FC	On loan	
(Netherlands) NED	DF	Ruben Kluivert	(Netherlands) Jong FC Utrecht	Internal transfer	
(Netherlands) NED	DF	Djevencio van der Kust	(Netherlands) Jong FC Utrecht	Internal transfer	
(Netherlands) NED	MF	Davy van den Berg	(Netherlands) Roda JC Kerkrade	Back from loan	
(Sweden) SWE	DF	Emil Bergström	(Netherlands) Willem II	Back from loan	
(Morocco) MAR	DF	Benaissa Benamar	(Netherlands) FC Volendam	Back from loan (with promotion final transfer)	
(Netherlands) NED	GK	Maarten Paes	(United States) FC Dallas	Back from loan (+option to buy)	

==== Transfers out ====
Nat.	Pos.	Player	Transferred to	Particularities	Ref.
(Netherlands) NED	MF	Urby Emanuelson	End of career		
(Netherlands) NED	DF	Willem Janssen	End of career		
(Netherlands) NED	MF	Adam Maher	(Saudi Arabia) Damac FC	Sold	
(Netherlands) NED	DF	Sylian Mokono	(Netherlands) Heracles Almelo	Sold	
(Netherlands) NED	MF	Quinten Timber	(Netherlands) Feyenoord	Sold	
(Netherlands) NED	FW	Henk Veerman	(Netherlands) FC Volendam	Sold	
(Sweden) SWE	FW	Pontus Almqvist	(Russia) FK Rostov	Was a transfer due to special Russia/Ukraine rule	
(Morocco) MAR	DF	Benaissa Benamar	(Netherlands) FC Volendam	Final transfer through promotion	
(Netherlands) NED	GK	Maarten Paes	(United States) FC Dallas	Buy option lifted	
(Sweden) SWE	DF	Emil Bergström	Without club	Transfer free	
(Sweden) SWE	MF	Simon Gustafson	(Sweden) BK Häcken	Transfer free	
(Germany) GER	GK	Eric Oelschlägel	(Netherlands) FC Emmen	Transfer free	
(Netherlands) NED	MF	Joris van Overeem	(Israel) Maccabi Tel Aviv	Transfer free	
(Netherlands) NED	FW	Remco Balk	(Netherlands) SC Cambuur	On loan	
(Netherlands) NED	MF	Davy van den Berg	(Netherlands) Jong FC Utrecht	Internal transfer	
(Netherlands) NED	DF	Christopher Mamengi	(Netherlands) Jong FC Utrecht	Internal transfer	
(Japan) JPN	FW	Naoki Maeda	(Japan) Nagoya Grampus	Back from loan	
(Netherlands) NED	DF	Mike van der Hoorn	(Germany) Arminia Bielefeld	Back from loan (+purchase obligation)	

=== Winter ===
==== Transfers in ====
Nat.	Pos.	Player	Transferred from	Particularities	Ref.
(Denmark) DEN	MF	Victor Jensen	(Netherlands) Ajax	Purchased	
(Morocco) MAR	MF	Zakaria Labyad	Without club	Transfer free	
(Belgium) BEL	FW	Anthony Descotte	(Belgium) RSC Charleroi	On loan (+option extra season rent and option to buy)	

==== Transfers out ====
Nat.	Pos.	Player	Transferred to	Particularities	Ref.
(France) FRA	FW	Moussa Sylla	(France) SM Caen	Sold	
(Netherlands) NED	FW	Daishawn Redan	(Germany) Hertha BSC	Terminated the loan earlier	
(France) FRA	FW	Arthur Zagre	(Monaco) AS Monaco	Terminated the loan earlier	
(Morocco) MAR	FW	Mimoun Mahi	(Netherlands) SC Cambuur	On loan	
(Netherlands) NED	DF	Djevencio van der Kust	(United States) Houston Dynamo FC	On loan (+option to buy)	

== Pre-season and friendlies ==
Win Draw Loss Fixtures

2 July 2022 Friendly	FC Utrecht (Netherlands)	2–4	(Scotland) Queen's Park	Utrecht, Netherlands
18:00 CEST (UTC+2)	Veerman 30'; El Azrak 58'; Booth (yellow card)	Report	Murray 12', 56'; Savoury 73'; Trialist 77'	Stadium: Sportcomplex Zoudenbalch; Attendance: 1,200; Referee: Marc Nagtegaal

6 July 2022 Friendly	KRC Genk (Belgium)	2–1	(Netherlands) FC Utrecht	Alkmaar, Netherlands
17:00 CEST (UTC+2)	Németh 30'; El Khannous 56'	Report	Van de Streek 15'	Stadium: Sportpark Overdie; Attendance: 0 Referee: Preston Henshuijs
Note: Behind closed doors.

8 July 2022 Friendly	sc Heerenveen (Netherlands)	0–1	(Netherlands) FC Utrecht	Jubbega, Netherlands
17:00 CEST (UTC+2)		Report	Van der Hoorn 90+1'	Stadium: Sportpark 't Heidefjild; Attendance: 1,500; Referee: Gerbert Stegeman

13 July 2022 Friendly	Club Brugge (Belgium)	4–2	(Netherlands) FC Utrecht	Knokke-Heist, Belgium
15:30 CEST (UTC+2)	Lang 13'; Viergever 20' (o.g.); Jutglà 68', 73'	Report	Douvikas 28'; Mahi 88'; Van der Hoorn (yellow card)	Stadium: Belfius Basecamp; Attendance: 0 Referee: Kevin Debeuckelaere
Note: Behind closed doors.

16 July 2022 Friendly	KV Kortrijk (Belgium)	2–1	(Netherlands) FC Utrecht	Kortrijk, Belgium
16:00 CEST (UTC+2)	Benchaib 39'; Gueye 84'; Radovanovic (yellow card)	Report	Boussaid 84'; Redan (yellow card)	Stadium: Guldensporenstadion; Attendance: 3,000; Referee: Unknown

20 July 2022 Friendly	FC Utrecht (Netherlands)	4–0	(Greece) OFI Crete	Utrecht, Netherlands
18:00 CEST (UTC+2)	Douvikas 9'; Veerman 29'; Redan 79', 90'	Report		Stadium: Sportcomplex Zoudenbalch; Attendance: 1,000 (Note: According to VI 30, page 78.); Referee: Stan Teuben

23 July 2022 Friendly	FC Utrecht (Netherlands)	2–1	(Netherlands) De Graafschap	Utrecht, Netherlands
14:00 CEST (UTC+2)	Redan 65', 78'	Report	Gravenberch 8'; Fortes (yellow card)	Stadium: Sportcomplex Zoudenbalch; Attendance: 0 Referee: Unknown
Note: Behind closed doors.

27 July 2022 Friendly	FC Utrecht (Netherlands)	0–1	(Greece) AEK Athens	Alkmaar, Netherlands
16:00 CEST (UTC+2)	Van der Maarel (yellow card)	Report	García 50'; Szymański (yellow card)	Stadium: Sportpark Overdie; Attendance: 0 Referee: Unknown
Note: Behind closed doors.

30 July 2022 Shakhtar Global Tour for Peace	FC Utrecht (Netherlands)	2–2	(Ukraine) Shakhtar Donetsk	Utrecht, Netherlands
16:30 CEST (UTC+2)	Redan 7'; Kryvtsov 65' (o.g.); Bozdogan (yellow card)	Report	Bondarenko 41'; Kryskiv 47'; Sudakov (yellow card)	Stadium: Stadion Galgenwaard; Attendance: 8,511; Referee: Jannick van der Laan

20 September 2022 Friendly	Ajax (Netherlands)	1–2	(Netherlands) FC Utrecht	Amsterdam, Netherlands
Unknown CEST (UTC+2)	Lucca 11'; Magallan (yellow card) (yellow-red card) 64'; Pierie (yellow card)	Report	Brouwers 33'; Meissen 45+1'; Redan (yellow card); Younes (yellow card)	Stadium: De Toekomst; Attendance: 0 Referee: Jannick van der Laan
Note: Behind closed doors.

17 December 2022 Friendly	FC Utrecht (Netherlands)	0–1	(Switzerland) Servette FC	Campoamor, Spain
14:00 CET (UTC+1)		Report	Van de Streek 28' (o.g.)	Stadium: Real Club de Golf Campoamor Resort; Attendance: Unknown; Referee: Pablo Pérez Alcocer

23 December 2022 Friendly	FC Utrecht (Netherlands)	0–3	(Netherlands) FC Groningen	Utrecht, Netherlands
13:00 CET (UTC+1)		Report	Suslov 7'; Pepi 23', 57'	Stadium: Sportcomplex Zoudenbalch; Attendance: Unknown; Referee: Marc Nagtegaal

23 December 2022 Friendly	ADO Den Haag (Netherlands)	4–4	(Netherlands) FC Utrecht	The Hague, Netherlands
13:30 CET (UTC+1)	De Waal 13'; Severina 38'; Werker 68'; Broekhuizen 77'	Report	Klaiber 30'; Sylla 34'; Bozdogan 49'; Redan 59'	Stadium: Bingoal Stadion; Attendance: 0 Referee: Unknown
Note: Behind closed doors.

30 December 2022 Friendly	RKC Waalwijk (Netherlands)	0–2	(Netherlands) FC Utrecht	Waalwijk, Netherlands
Unknown CET (UTC+1)		Report	Dost 37'; Boussaid 54'	Stadium: Unknown; Attendance: 0 Referee: Unknown
Note: Behind closed doors.

== Competitions ==
=== Overall record ===
Competition	First match	Last match	Starting round	Final position	Record							
Competition	First match	Last match	Starting round	Final position	Pld	W	D	L	GF	GA	GD	Win %
Eredivisie	6 August 2022	28 May 2023	Matchday 1	7th	34	15	9	10	55	50	+5	44.12
KNVB Cup	20 October 2022	28 February 2023	First round	Quarter-final	4	3	0	1	9	6	+3	75.00
Play-offs	1 June 2023	4 June 2023	Semi-final	Semi-final	2	0	0	2	2	2	+0	0.00
Total					40	18	9	13	66	58	+8	45.00

Last updated: 5 June 2023
Source: Soccerway

=== Eredivisie ===
==== League table ====
Pos	Team	Pld	W	D	L	GF	GA	GD	Pts	Qualification or relegation
5	Twente (O)	34	18	10	6	66	27	+39	64	Qualification to European competition play-offs
6	Sparta Rotterdam	34	17	8	9	60	37	+23	59	Qualification to European competition play-offs
7	Utrecht	34	15	9	10	55	50	+5	54	Qualification to European competition play-offs
8	Heerenveen	34	12	10	12	44	50	−6	46	Qualification to European competition play-offs
9	RKC Waalwijk	34	11	8	15	50	64	−14	41	

Source: Eredivisie
Rules for classification: Season in progress: 1) Most points won; 2) Less points lost; 3) Goal difference; 4) Goals scored; 5) Alphabetical order; End of season: 1) Points; 2) Goal difference; 3) Goals scored; 4) Head-to-head points; 5) Head-to-head goal difference; 6) Head-to-head away goals scored; 7) Play-off if relevant for deciding champion, relegation or participating in a European league, otherwise by draw. 8) Penalty shoot-out (only after a play-off)
(O) Play-off Winner

==== Results summary ====
Overall								Home						Away					
Pld	W	D	L	GF	GA	GD	Pts	W	D	L	GF	GA	GD	W	D	L	GF	GA	GD
34	15	9	10	55	50	+5	54	8	5	4	20	15	+5	7	4	6	35	35	0

Last updated: 28 May 2023.
Source: Eredivisie

==== Results by round ====
Round	1	2	3	4	5	6	7	8	9	10	11	12	13	14	15	16	17	18	19	20	21	22	23	24	25	26	27	28	29	30	31	32	33	34
Ground	A	H	A	H	A	H	H	U	H	A	H	A	H	A	H	A	A	H	A	H	A	H	A	H	A	H	H	A	H	A	A	H	A	H
Result	D	D	L	L	W	W	D	W	L	L	W	W	W	W	D	D	L	W	D	W	L	D	W	L	D	L	D	W	W	L	W	W	L	W
Position	7	9	12	15	11	8	9	7	9	9	8	7	7	7	7	7	8	7	7	7	7	7	7	7	7	7	7	7	7	7	7	7	7	7

Updated to match(es) played on 28 May 2023. Source: Eredivisie
A = Away; H = Home; W = Win; D = Draw; L = Loss

==== Matches ====
The league fixtures were announced on 17 June 2022.

6 August 2022 1	RKC Waalwijk	2–2	FC Utrecht	Waalwijk
21:00 CEST (UTC+2)	Van den Buijs 15'; Bel Hassani 45'; Oukili (yellow card) 79'	Report	Dost 52', 85'	Stadium: Mandemakers Stadion; Attendance: 4,526; Referee: Rob Dieperink

13 August 2022 2	FC Utrecht	0–0	SC Cambuur	Utrecht
20:00 CEST (UTC+2)	Booth (yellow card) 14'; Brouwers (yellow card) 47'; Van der Maarel (yellow card) 86'	Report	Uldrikis (yellow card) 31'	Stadium: Stadion Galgenwaard; Attendance: 21,019; Referee: Erwin Blank

20 August 2022 3	FC Emmen	3–2	FC Utrecht	Emmen
21:00 CEST (UTC+2)	Romeny 27'`; Mendes 59'; Vlak 79'	Report	Douvikas 10'; Dost 34'	Stadium: De Oude Meerdijk; Attendance: 8,024; Referee: Jochem Kamphuis

28 August 2022 4	FC Utrecht	0–2	Ajax	Utrecht
12:15 CEST (UTC+2)	Boussaid (yellow card) 53'; Dost (yellow card) 88'	Report	Berghuis 10'; Timber (yellow card) 35'; Rensch (yellow card) 36'; Brobbey 45+1'; Tadic (yellow card) 70'	Stadium: Stadion Galgenwaard; Attendance: 21,471; Referee: Danny Makkelie

2 September 2022 5	Fortuna Sittard	3–4	FC Utrecht	Sittard
20:00 CEST (UTC+2)	Guth 67'; Tirpan (yellow card) 71'; Yilmaz 82' (pen.); Noslin 90+7'	Report	Dost 64'; Douvikas 70' (pen.), 77', 86'; Toornstra (yellow card) 81'; Van der Maarel (yellow card) 83'	Stadium: Fortuna Sittard Stadion; Attendance: 8,763; Referee: Allard Lindhout

11 September 2022 6	FC Utrecht	1–0	Vitesse	Utrecht
12:15 CEST (UTC+2)	Dost 84'	Report	Wittek (yellow card) 79'	Stadium: Stadion Galgenwaard; Attendance: 15,807; Referee: Bas Nijhuis

16 September 2022 7	FC Utrecht	0–0	N.E.C. Nijmegen	Utrecht
20:00 CEST (UTC+2)	Van der Kust (yellow card) 40'; Bozdogan (yellow card) 71'; Boussaid (yellow card) 90'	Report	Schöne (yellow card) 73'	Stadium: Stadion Galgenwaard; Attendance: 17,547; Referee: Marc Nagtegaal

2 October 2022 8	Excelsior Rotterdam	0–1	FC Utrecht	Rotterdam
14:30 CEST (UTC+2)	Horemans (yellow card) 19'; El Yaakoubi (yellow card) 90'	Report	Van de Streek 31'; Bozdogan (yellow card) 39'	Stadium: Van Donge & De Roo Stadion; Attendance: 4,142; Referee: Richard Martens

9 October 2022 9	FC Utrecht	1–2	AZ	Utrecht
14:30 CEST (UTC+2)	Brouwers (yellow card) 34'; Redan (yellow card) 67'; Sagnan (yellow card) 77'; Sylla 90+3'	Report	Van Brederode 31'; Sugawara 68'	Stadium: Stadion Galgenwaard; Attendance: 20,873; Referee: Serdar Gözübüyük

16 October 2022 10	PSV	6–1	FC Utrecht	Eindhoven
14:30 CEST (UTC+2)	Simons 8', 60'; Til 33', 38'; El Ghazi 86', 89'	Report	Van de Streek 24'; Klaiber (yellow card) 29'; Dost (yellow card) 41'; Van der Maarel (yellow card) 55'	Stadium: Philips Stadion; Attendance: 30,646; Referee: Jochem Kamphuis

23 October 2022 11	FC Utrecht	3–1	Sparta Rotterdam	Utrecht
16:45 CEST (UTC+2)	Redan 6'; Douvikas 48'; Klaiber 79'	Report	Kitolano 84'; Van Crooij (yellow card) 90+3'; Eerdhuijzen (yellow card) 90+5'	Stadium: Stadion Galgenwaard; Attendance: 20,048; Referee: Bas Nijhuis

29 October 2022 12	sc Heerenveen	1–2	FC Utrecht	Heerenveen
16:30 CEST (UTC+2)	Van Hooijdonk 33'; Tahiri (yellow card) 45+1'; Haye (yellow card) 81'	Report	Douvikas 44'; Toornstra (yellow card) 58'; Sagnan 66'; Brouwers (yellow card) 77'; Van de Streek (yellow card) 77'; Boussaid (yellow card) 87'	Stadium: Abe Lenstra Stadion; Attendance: 22,150; Referee: Jeroen Manschot

6 November 2022 13	FC Utrecht	2–1	FC Groningen	Utrecht
12:15 CET (UTC+1)	Klaiber (yellow card) 45+1'; Booth 62', (yellow card) 79'; Sagnan (yellow card) 68'; Van de Streek 84'	Report	Krüger 40'; Valente (yellow card) 45+1'	Stadium: Stadion Galgenwaard; Attendance: 19,904; Referee: Edwin van de Graaf

12 November 2022 14	FC Volendam	0–4	FC Utrecht	Volendam
16:30 CET (UTC+1)	Zeefuik (yellow card) 57'	Report	Booth 14'; Van de Streek (yellow card) 52', (goal) 84'; Dost 73'; Bozdogan 90+2'	Stadium: Kras Stadion; Attendance: 6,650; Referee: Sander van der Eijk

8 January 2023 15	FC Utrecht	1–1	Feyenoord	Utrecht
12:15 CET (UTC+1)	Toornstra 3'; Van der Hoorn (yellow card) 45+1'; Van der Maarel (yellow card) 60'	Report	Idrissi (yellow card) 45+1'; Jahanbakhsh 90'	Stadium: Stadion Galgenwaard; Attendance: 20,857; Referee: Bas Nijhuis

15 January 2023 16	Go Ahead Eagles	2–2	FC Utrecht	Deventer
14:30 CET (UTC+1)	Adekanye 10'; Willumsson (yellow card) 26'; Tekie (yellow card) 31'; Amofa (yellow card) 56'; Sow 90'	Report	Willumsson 3' (o.g.); Van de Streek 13'; Klaiber (yellow card) 88'	Stadium: De Adelaarshorst; Attendance: 9,793; Referee: Joey Kooij

22 January 2023 17	FC Twente	2–0	FC Utrecht	Enschede
14:30 CET (UTC+1)	Černý 45+1'; Misidjan 64'; Salah-Eddine (yellow card) 80'	Report	Booth (yellow card) 50'	Stadium: De Grolsch Veste; Attendance: 28,500; Referee: Martin van den Kerkhof

25 January 2023 18	FC Utrecht	1–0	Excelsior Rotterdam	Utrecht
21:00 CET (UTC+1)	Douvikas 6'; Booth (yellow card) 57'	Report	Koopmeiners (yellow card) 45+1'; Azarkan (yellow card) 86'; Dijkhuizen (yellow card) 86'	Stadium: Stadion Galgenwaard; Attendance: 17,058; Referee: Laurens Gerrets

28 January 2023 19	AZ	5–5	FC Utrecht	Alkmaar
21:00 CET (UTC+1)	Dekker 20'; Pavlidis 31', 34', 78'; M. de Wit 70'	Report	Douvikas 12', 16', 65'; Viergever 41', (yellow card) 90+2'; Van de Streek 80'	Stadium: AFAS Stadion; Attendance: 16,765; Referee: Edwin van de Graaf

4 February 2023 20	FC Utrecht	1–0	sc Heerenveen	Utrecht
20:00 CET (UTC+1)	Douvikas 69' (pen.); Toornstra (yellow card) 84'	Report	Bochniewicz (yellow card) 66'; Van Ottele (yellow card) 86'	Stadium: Stadion Galgenwaard; Attendance: 19,444; Referee: Jeroen Manschot

12 February 2023 21	Vitesse	2–0	FC Utrecht	Arnhem
14:30 CET (UTC+1)	Oroz (yellow card) 40'; Arcus (red card) 51'; Manhoef 63'; Wittek 90+4'	Report	Bozdogan (yellow card) 53'; Toornstra (yellow card) 84'	Stadium: GelreDome; Attendance: 13,211; Referee: Jannick van der Laan

19 February 2023 22	FC Utrecht	2–2	PSV	Utrecht
14:30 CET (UTC+1)	Boussaid 33'; Van de Streek 60'	Report	Bakayoko 41'; De Jong 57'; Branthwaite (yellow card) 63'	Stadium: Stadion Galgenwaard; Attendance: 22,043; Referee: Allard Lindhout

24 February 2023 23	Sparta Rotterdam	0–3	FC Utrecht	Rotterdam
20:00 CET (UTC+1)	Sambo (yellow card) 38'; Auassar (red card) 49'; De Guzmán (yellow card) 71'; Namli (yellow card) 90+2'	Report	Brouwers (yellow card) 27'; Sagnan (yellow card) 45+1'; Jensen 74'; Boussaid 88'; Descotte 89'; Ramselaar (yellow card) 90+5'	Stadium: Het Kasteel; Attendance: 10,000; Referee: Joey Kooij

3 March 2023 24	FC Utrecht	1–2	Fortuna Sittard	Utrecht
20:00 CET (UTC+1)	Douvikas 59'; Toornstra (yellow card) 85'; Van de Streek (yellow card) 90+6'	Report	Bistrovic 69', (yellow card) 77'; Noslin 87'	Stadium: Stadion Galgenwaard; Attendance: 18,634; Referee: Edwin van de Graaf

12 March 2023 25	N.E.C. Nijmegen	2–2	FC Utrecht	Nijmegen
12:15 CET (UTC+1)	Dimata 31', 48'; Van Rooij (yellow card) 80'	Report	Labyad (yellow card) 53'; Van der Hoorn (yellow card) 59'; Dost 63'; Boussaid 67'; Van der Maarel (yellow card) 80'	Stadium: Goffertstadion; Attendance: 12,500; Referee: Ingmar Oostrom

18 March 2023 26	FC Utrecht	1–2	Go Ahead Eagles	Utrecht
16:30 CET (UTC+1)	Kluivert (yellow card) 20'; Toornstra (yellow card) 21'; Douvikas 41'	Report	Adekanye (yellow card) 33'; Edvardsen 45+3'; Amofa (yellow card) 86'; Willumsson 90+4'	Stadium: Stadion Galgenwaard; Attendance: 20,006; Referee: Alex Bos

2 April 2023 27	FC Utrecht	0–0	FC Volendam	Utrecht
14:30 CEST (UTC+2)	Van der Hoorn (yellow card) 39'; Klaiber (yellow card) 86'	Report	Veerman (yellow card) 64'	Stadium: Stadion Galgenwaard; Attendance: 22,050; Referee: Richard Martens

7 April 2023 28	FC Groningen	1–2	FC Utrecht	Groningen
20:00 CEST (UTC+2)	Antman 45+10'; Hove (yellow card) 75'; Chalus (yellow card) 80'; Krüger (yellow card) 80'; Määttä (yellow card) 82'	Report	Douvikas 45+7'; Van de Streek (yellow card) 69'; Dost 76'	Stadium: Euroborg; Attendance: 21,659; Referee: Jeroen Manschot

16 April 2023 29	FC Utrecht	1–0	FC Twente	Utrecht
14:30 CEST (UTC+2)	Van de Streek 70'	Report	Misidjan (yellow card) 36'; Van Wolfswinkel (yellow card) 81'	Stadium: Stadion Galgenwaard; Attendance: 18,324; Referee: Dennis Higler

23 April 2023 30	Feyenoord	3–1	FC Utrecht	Rotterdam
16:45 CEST (UTC+2)	Szymanski 15'; Gimenez 54'; Jahanbakhsh 82'	Report	Brouwers (yellow card) 20'; Dost 89'; Kluivert (yellow card) 90+2'	Stadium: De Kuip; Attendance: 47,500; Referee: Edwin van de Graaf

6 May 2023 31	SC Cambuur	0–3	FC Utrecht	Leeuwarden
20:00 CEST (UTC+2)		Report	Van de Streek 37'; Douvikas 41', 64' (pen.); Booth (yellow card) 45+1'	Stadium: Cambuur Stadion; Attendance: 9,600; Referee: Jochem Kamphuis

13 May 2023 32	FC Utrecht	2–0	RKC Waalwijk	Utrecht
21:00 CEST (UTC+2)	Douvikas (penalty missed) 20', 60'; Toornstra (yellow card) 65'; Labyad 90+3'	Report	Adewoye (yellow card) 18'; Gaari (yellow card) 54'	Stadium: Stadion Galgenwaard; Attendance: 18,926; Referee: Ingmar Oostrom

21 May 2023 33	Ajax	3–1	FC Utrecht	Amsterdam
14:30 CEST (UTC+2)	Bergwijn 20'; Brobbey 68'; Klaassen 90+3'	Report	Douvikas 49', (yellow card) 75'	Stadium: Johan Cruijff ArenA; Attendance: 54,627; Referee: Bas Nijhuis

28 May 2023 34	FC Utrecht	3–2	FC Emmen	Utrecht
14:30 CEST (UTC+2)	Van der Hoorn 2', (red card) 63'; Douvikas 53'; Viergever 79'	Report	Romeny 35'; Diemers 58'; Zivkovic (yellow card) 72'	Stadium: Stadion Galgenwaard; Attendance: 22,065; Referee: Richard Martens

=== KNVB Cup ===
20 October 2022 First round	Sportlust '46	0–3	FC Utrecht	Woerden
18:45 CEST (UTC+2)		Report	Van de Streek 18', 70'; Klaiber 90+3'	Stadium: Sportpark Cromwijck; Attendance: 3,500; Referee: Rob Dieperink

12 January 2023 Second round	Blauw Geel '38	1–3	FC Utrecht	Veghel
20:00 CET (UTC+1)	Van den Nieuwenhof 69'	Report	Van de Streek 2'; Toornstra 32'; Douvikas 42'	Stadium: Sportpark Prins Willem Alexander; Attendance: 3,300; Referee: Jochem Kamphuis

7 February 2023 Round of 16	AZ	1–2 (a.e.t.)	FC Utrecht	Alkmaar
18:45 CET (UTC+1)	Pavlidis (yellow card) 80'; Karlsson (penalty missed) 86', 86'; Kerkez (yellow card) 105+2'	Report	Viergever 58'; Maeda 93', (yellow card) 110'; Barkas (yellow card) 118'	Stadium: AFAS Stadion; Attendance: 10,214; Referee: Jochem Kamphuis

28 February 2023 Quarter-final	FC Utrecht	1–4	SV Spakenburg	Utrecht
20:00 CET (UTC+1)	Douvikas 64'	Report	Vink 12'; Verhagen (yellow card) 36'; Van der Linden (yellow card) 38', (goal) 75'; Admiraal 59'; Artien 66'	Stadium: Stadion Galgenwaard; Attendance: 21,733; Referee: Martin van den Kerkhof

=== Play-offs ===
Semi-final

1 June 2023 First leg	FC Utrecht	1–2	Sparta Rotterdam	Utrecht
21:00 CEST (UTC+2)	Douvikas (yellow card) 28', (goal) 70'; Klaiber (yellow card) 34'	Report	V. van Crooij 29' (pen.); Olij (yellow card) 34'; Lauritsen 39'; Sambo (yellow card) 45+3'	Stadium: Stadion Galgenwaard; Attendance: 16,841; Referee: Sander van der Eijk

4 June 2023 Second leg	Sparta Rotterdam	0–1 (a.e.t.) (5–4 p)	FC Utrecht	Rotterdam
18:00 CEST (UTC+2)	V. van Crooij (yellow card) 90+1'	Report	Van der Maarel (yellow card) 59'; Viergever 80'; Bozdogan (yellow card) 90+6'	Stadium: Het Kasteel; Attendance: 10,599; Referee: Jochem Kamphuis
	Penalties
	V. van Crooij (penalty scored); Verschueren (penalty scored); Abels (penalty scored); Kitolano (penalty scored); Auassar (penalty missed); Sambo (penalty scored)		(penalty scored) Dost; (penalty scored) Booth; (penalty scored) Van de Streek; (penalty missed) Brouwers; (penalty scored) Bozdogan; (penalty missed) Van der Hoorn

== Statistics ==
=== Goalscorers ===
Friendlies

No.	Name	Goal
1.	(Netherlands) Daishawn Redan	6
2.	(Belgium) Othmane Boussaid	2
2.	(Greece) Anastasios Douvikas	2
2.	(Netherlands) Henk Veerman	2
5.	(Netherlands) Rayan El Azrak	1
5.	(Germany) Can Bozdogan	1
5.	(Netherlands) Luuk Brouwers	1
5.	(Netherlands) Bas Dost	1
5.	(Netherlands) Mike van der Hoorn	1
5.	(Suriname) Sean Klaiber	1
5.	(Morocco) Mimoun Mahi	1
5.	(Netherlands) Rick Meissen	1
5.	(Netherlands) Sander van de Streek	1
5.	(France) Moussa Sylla	1
Own goals opponent		1
Totals		23

(Netherlands) Eredivisie

No.	Name	Goal
1.	(Greece) Anastasios Douvikas	19
2.	(Netherlands) Bas Dost	9
2.	(Netherlands) Sander van de Streek	9
4.	(Belgium) Othmane Boussaid	3
5.	(United States) Taylor Booth	2
5.	(Netherlands) Nick Viergever	2
7.	(Germany) Can Bozdogan	1
7.	(Belgium) Anthony Descotte	1
7.	(Netherlands) Mike van der Hoorn	1
7.	(Denmark) Victor Jensen	1
7.	(Suriname) Sean Klaiber	1
7.	(Morocco) Zakaria Labyad	1
7.	(Netherlands) Daishawn Redan	1
7.	(France) Modibo Sagnan	1
7.	(France) Moussa Sylla	1
7.	(Netherlands) Jens Toornstra	1
Own goals opponent		1
Totals		55

(Netherlands) KNVB Cup

No.	Name	Goal
1.	(Netherlands) Sander van de Streek	3
2.	(Greece) Anastasios Douvikas	2
3.	(Suriname) Sean Klaiber	1
3.	(Japan) Naoki Maeda	1
3.	(Netherlands) Jens Toornstra	1
3.	(Netherlands) Nick Viergever	1
Own goals opponent		-
Totals		9

(Netherlands) Play-offs

No.	Name	Goal
1.	(Greece) Anastasios Douvikas	1
1.	(Netherlands) Nick Viergever	1
Own goals opponent		–
Totals		2

=== Assists ===
(Netherlands) Eredivisie

No.	Name	
1.	(Belgium) Othmane Boussaid	5
1.	(Germany) Can Bozdogan	5
1.	(Netherlands) Jens Toornstra	5
4.	(United States) Taylor Booth	4
4.	(Greece) Anastasios Douvikas	4
4.	(Suriname) Sean Klaiber	4
7.	(Netherlands) Bas Dost	2
7.	(Netherlands) Sander van de Streek	2
7.	(Germany) Amin Younes	2
10.	(Netherlands) Luuk Brouwers	1
10.	(Netherlands) Mike van der Hoorn	1
10.	(Denmark) Victor Jensen	1
10.	(France) Moussa Sylla	1
Totals		37

(Netherlands) KNVB Cup

No.	Name	
1.	(Belgium) Othmane Boussaid	2
2.	(Suriname) Sean Klaiber	1
2.	(Netherlands) Sander van de Streek	1
Totals		4

(Netherlands) Play-offs

No.	Name	
1.	(Netherlands) Sander van de Streek	1
Totals		1

== Monthly awards ==
Month	Type of award	Player	Ref.
November	Player of the Month	(United States) Taylor Booth	1
November	Team of the Month	(United States) Taylor Booth	2
January	Team of the Month	(Greece) Anastasios Douvikas	3
May	Team of the Month	(Greece) Anastasios Douvikas	4

== Attendance ==
=== Home games ===
Round	Opponent	Attendance	Total attendance	Average
Friendlies
N/A	(Scotland) Queen's Park FC	1,200 (Note: Match played at Sportcomplex Zoudenbalch.)	1,200	1,200
N/A	(Greece) OFI Crete	1,000 (Note: According to VI 30, page 78.)	2,200	1,100
N/A	(Netherlands) De Graafschap	0	0	1,100
N/A	(Greece) AEK Athens	0 (Note: Match played at the sports park of VV Alkmaarsche Boys.)	0	1,100
N/A	(Ukraine) Shakhtar Donetsk	8,511 (Note: Match played in Stadion Galgenwaard.)	10,711	3,570
N/A	(Switzerland) Servette FC	Unknown (Note: Match played in Campoamor, Spain.)	10,711	3,570
N/A	(Netherlands) FC Groningen	Unknown	10,711	3,570
Eredivisie
2	SC Cambuur	21,019	21,019	21,019
4	Ajax	21,471	42,490	21,245
6	Vitesse	15,807	58,297	19,432
7	N.E.C. Nijmegen	17,547	75,844	18,961
9	AZ	20,873	96,717	19,343
11	Sparta Rotterdam	20,048	116,765	19,461
13	FC Groningen	19,904	136,669	19,524
15	Feyenoord	20,857	157,526	19,691
18	Excelsior Rotterdam	17,058	174,584	19,398
20	sc Heerenveen	19,444	194,028	19,403
22	PSV	22,043	216,071	19,643
24	Fortuna Sittard	18,634	234,705	19,559
26	Go Ahead Eagles	20,006	254,711	19,593
27	FC Volendam	22,050	276,761	19,769
29	FC Twente	18,324	295,085	19,672
32	RKC Waalwijk	18,926	314,011	19,626
34	FC Emmen	22,065	336,076	19,769
KNVB Cup
Quarter-final	SV Spakenburg	21,733	21,733	21,733
Play-offs
Semi-final	Sparta Rotterdam	16,841	16,841	16,841

=== Away supporters ===
Round	Opponent	Attendance	Total attendance	Average
Eredivisie
1	RKC Waalwijk	542	542	542
3	FC Emmen	375	917	459
5	Fortuna Sittard	389	1,306	435
8	Excelsior Rotterdam	400	1,706	427
10	PSV	621	2,327	465
12	sc Heerenveen	321	2,648	441
14	FC Volendam	400	3,048	435
16	Go Ahead Eagles	400	3,448	431
17	FC Twente	0	3,448	431
19	AZ	584	4,032	448
21	Vitesse	0	4,032	448
23	Sparta Rotterdam	650	4,682	468
25	N.E.C. Nijmegen	500	5,182	471
28	FC Groningen	510	5,692	474
30	Feyenoord	788	6,480	498
31	SC Cambuur	0	6,480	498
33	Ajax	775	7,255	518
KNVB Cup
First round	Sportlust '46	Unknown	Unknown	Unknown
Second round	Blauw Geel '38	297	297	297
Round of 16	AZ	750	1,047	524
Play-offs
Semi-final	Sparta Rotterdam	650	650	650
