= 2020–21 AFC Ajax season =

Dutch football club season

Ajax
2020–21 season
- Owner: AFC Ajax N.V.
- CEO: Edwin van der Sar
- Manager: Erik ten Hag
- Stadium: Johan Cruyff Arena
- Eredivisie: 1st
- KNVB Cup: Winners
- UEFA Champions League: Group stage
- UEFA Europa League: Quarter-finals
- Top goalscorer: League: Dušan Tadić (14); All: Dušan Tadić (22)
- Average home league attendance: 12,062
- Biggest win: 13–0 (vs. VVV-Venlo, 24 October 2020)
Home colours	Away colours	Third colours

The 2020–21 season was Ajax's 121st season in existence and the club's 65th consecutive season in the Eredivisie. In addition to the domestic league, Ajax participated in this season's edition of the KNVB Cup, the UEFA Champions League and the UEFA Europa League.

== Squad ==
As of 1 February 2021

Note: Flags indicate national team as defined under FIFA eligibility rules; some limited exceptions apply. Players may hold more than one non-FIFA nationality.

No.	Pos.	Nation	Player
1	GK	NED	Maarten Stekelenburg
2	DF	NED	Jurriën Timber
3	DF	NED	Perr Schuurs
4	DF	MEX	Edson Álvarez
5	DF	SUR	Sean Klaiber
6	MF	NED	Davy Klaassen
7	FW	BRA	David Neres
8	MF	NED	Ryan Gravenberch
9	FW	MAR	Oussama Idrissi
10	MF	SRB	Dušan Tadić (captain)
12	DF	MAR	Noussair Mazraoui
16	GK	NED	Kjell Scherpen

No.	Pos.	Nation	Player
17	DF	NED	Daley Blind (vice-captain)
18	MF	NED	Jurgen Ekkelenkamp
19	MF	MAR	Zakaria Labyad
20	MF	GHA	Mohammed Kudus
21	DF	ARG	Lisandro Martínez
22	FW	CIV	Sébastien Haller
23	FW	BFA	Lassina Traoré
24	GK	CMR	André Onana
31	DF	ARG	Nicolás Tagliafico
33	GK	CRO	Dominik Kotarski
39	FW	BRA	Antony

== Transfers ==
For a list of all Dutch football transfers in the summer window (1 July 2020 to 31 August 2020) please see List of Dutch football transfers summer 2020. For a list of all Dutch football transfers in the winter window (1 January 2021 to 1 February 2021) please see List of Dutch football transfers winter 2020–21.

=== Transfers in ===
Date	Pos.	Name	Transferred from	Fee	Ref.
1 July 2020	FW	(Brazil) Antony	(Brazil) São Paulo	€15,750,000 (Note: Fee may eventually rise to €21,750,000, due to undisclosed bonuses.)	
1 July 2020	DF	(Argentina) Lisandro Magallán	(Spain) Alavés	Loan return	
1 July 2020	FW	(Netherlands) Noa Lang	(Netherlands) FC Twente	Loan return	
1 July 2020	DF	(Netherlands) Sven Botman	(Netherlands) SC Heerenveen	Loan return	
1 July 2020	FW	(Norway) Dennis Johnsen	(Netherlands) PEC Zwolle	Loan return	
16 July 2020	FW	(Ghana) Mohammed Kudus	(Denmark) Nordsjælland	€9,000,000 (Note: Fee may eventually rise due to undisclosed bonuses.)	
1 August 2020	GK	(Netherlands) Maarten Stekelenburg	(England) Everton	Free transfer	
14 August 2020	FW	(Denmark) Jeppe Kjær	(Denmark) AC Horsens	€2,000,000	
1 October 2020	DF	(Netherlands) Sean Klaiber	(Netherlands) FC Utrecht	€5,000,000 (Note: Fee may eventually rise to €7,000,000, due to undisclosed bonuses.)	
5 October 2020	MF	(Netherlands) Davy Klaassen	(Germany) Werder Bremen	€11,000,000 (Note: Fee may eventually rise to €14,000,000, due to undisclosed bonuses.)	
5 October 2020	FW	(Burkina Faso) Hassane Bandé	(Switzerland) FC Thun	Loan return	
8 January 2021	FW	(Ivory Coast) Sébastien Haller	(England) West Ham United	€22,500,000	

=== Transfers out ===
Date	Pos.	Name	Transferred to	Fee	Ref.
1 July 2020	MF	(Morocco) Hakim Ziyech	(England) Chelsea	€40,000,000 (Note: Fee may eventually rise to €44,000,000, due to undisclosed bonuses.)	
1 July 2020	GK	(Netherlands) Benjamin van Leer	(Netherlands) Sparta Rotterdam	Undisclosed	
1 July 2020	GK	(Portugal) Bruno Varela	(Portugal) Benfica	End of loan	
1 July 2020	FW	(Netherlands) Ryan Babel	(Turkey) Galatasaray	End of loan	
14 July 2020	FW	(Germany) Nicolas Kühn	(Germany) Bayern Munich	Undisclosed	
15 July 2020	MF	(Netherlands) Jasper ter Heide	(Netherlands) SC Cambuur	Undisclosed	
17 July 2020	DF	(Netherlands) Boy Kemper	(Netherlands) ADO Den Haag	Undisclosed	
29 July 2020	DF	(Netherlands) Joël Veltman	(England) Brighton & Hove Albion	€1,000,000	
31 July 2020	DF	(Netherlands) Sven Botman	(France) Lille OSC	€8,000,000 (Note: Fee may eventually rise due to undisclosed bonuses.)	
25 August 2020	FW	(Norway) Dennis Johnsen	(Italy) Venezia	Undisclosed	
2 September 2020	MF	(Netherlands) Donny van de Beek	(England) Manchester United	€39,000,000	
1 October 2020	DF	(United States) Sergiño Dest	(Spain) Barcelona	€21,230,000 (Note: Fee may eventually rise to €26,230,000, due to undisclosed bonuses.)	
19 January 2021	FW	(Netherlands) Klaas-Jan Huntelaar	(Germany) FC Schalke 04	Free transfer	
24 February 2021	FW	(Netherlands) Quincy Promes	(Russia) Spartak Moscow	€8,500,000 (Note: Fee may eventually rise to €11,000,000, due to undisclosed bonuses.)	

=== Loans in ===
Start date	Pos.	Name	To	End date	Fee	Ref.
1 February 2021	FW	(Morocco) Oussama Idrissi	(Spain) Sevilla	30 June 2021	Undisclosed	

=== Loans out ===
Start date	Pos.	Name	To	End date	Fee	Ref.
16 July 2020	DF	(Netherlands) Kik Pierie	(Netherlands) FC Twente	30 June 2021	Undisclosed	
14 August 2020	FW	(Brazil) Danilo	(Netherlands) FC Twente	30 June 2021	Undisclosed	
31 August 2020	MF	(Romania) Răzvan Marin	(Italy) Cagliari	30 June 2021 (Note: Cagliari has the compulsory option to convert the loan in a permanent transfer for €10,000,000.)	Undisclosed	
3 September 2020	DF	(Argentina) Lisandro Magallán	(Italy) Crotone	30 June 2021 (Note: The loan agreement includes a take-over option for Crotone of €8,500,000.)	Undisclosed	
19 September 2020	MF	(Netherlands) Carel Eiting	(England) Huddersfield Town	30 June 2021	Undisclosed	
5 October 2020	MF	(Netherlands) Noa Lang	(Belgium) Club Brugge	30 June 2021 (Note: Club Brugge has the compulsory option to convert the loan in a permanent transfer for €6,000,000.)	Undisclosed	
9 February 2021	FW	(Burkina Faso) Hassane Bandé	(Croatia) NK Istra 1961	30 June 2022 (Note: The loan agreement includes a take-over option for NK Istra 1961.)	Undisclosed	

=== Transfer summary ===
Undisclosed fees are not included in the transfer totals.

Expenditure

Summer: ▼€42,750,000

Winter: ▼€22,500,000

Total: ▼€65,250,000

Income

Summer: ▲€109,230,000

Winter: ▲€8,500,000

Total: ▲€117,730,000

Net totals

Summer: ▲€66,480,000

Winter: ▼€14,000,000

Total: ▲€52,480,000

== Pre-season and friendlies ==
Win Draw Loss Fixtures

8 August 2020	Ajax (Netherlands)	6–1	(Netherlands) RKC Waalwijk	Amsterdam, Netherlands
18:45 CEST	Traoré 20'; Huntelaar 47', 90+3'; Ekkelenkamp 52'; Antony 61', 90+1'	Report	Van Grunsven 78'	Stadium: Johan Cruyff Arena

13 August 2020	Ajax (Netherlands)	5–1	(Netherlands) FC Utrecht	Amsterdam, Netherlands
18:45 CEST	Labyad 4', 41', 45+4'; Mazraoui (yellow card) 12'; Lang 21'; Tagliafico 35'	Report	Klaiber (yellow card) 39'; St. Jago (yellow card) 64'; Boussaid 73'	Stadium: Johan Cruyff Arena

18 August 2020	Wolfsberger AC (Austria)	0–2	(Netherlands) Ajax	Saalfelden, Austria
18:00 CEST	Peretz (yellow card) 54'	Report	Promes 3'; Martínez (yellow card) 32'; Gravenberch 52'	Stadium: Saalfelden Arena

22 August 2020	Red Bull Salzburg (Austria)	1–4	(Netherlands) Ajax	Wals-Siezenheim, Austria
16:00 CEST	Koïta 9' (pen.), (yellow card) 70'	Report	Gravenberch 2'; Antony 16'; Van de Beek 67'; Rensch 82'	Stadium: Stadion Wals-Siezenheim

25 August 2020	Ajax (Netherlands)	5–2	(Germany) Holstein Kiel	Duivendrecht, Netherlands
14:00 CEST	Traoré 3', 34'; Rensch 25'; Ekkelenkamp 44', 59'	Report	Serra 71'; Bartels 88'	Stadium: Sportpark De Toekomst

25 August 2020	Ajax (Netherlands)	1–0	(Germany) Hertha BSC	Amsterdam, Netherlands
19:00 CEST	Labyad 12'	Report		Stadium: Johan Cruyff Arena

29 August 2020	Ajax (Netherlands)	2–1	(Germany) Eintracht Frankfurt	Amsterdam, Netherlands
19:00 CEST	Promes 4'; Kudus 47'; Gravenberch (yellow card) 54'; Álvarez (yellow card) 65'	Report	Rode (yellow card) 35'; Da Costa (yellow card) 36'; Silva 51'; Ndicka (yellow card) 65'; Kohr (yellow card) 67'	Stadium: Johan Cruyff Arena

30 August 2020	Ajax (Netherlands)	2–2	(Germany) Union Berlin	Amsterdam, Netherlands
13:00 CEST	Traoré (yellow card) 23'; Eiting 27'; Ekkelenkamp 69'	Report	Ingvartsen 48'; Bülter 57'; Gießelmann (yellow card) 60'	Stadium: Johan Cruyff Arena

5 September 2020	Ajax (Netherlands)	1–0	(Germany) FC Augsburg	Duivendrecht, Netherlands
14:00 CEST	Labyad 19' (pen.)	Report	Gouweleeuw (yellow card) 67'	Stadium: Sportpark De Toekomst

7 October 2020	Ajax (Netherlands)	1–1	(Netherlands) AZ	Duivendrecht, Netherlands
14:00 CEST	Traoré 44'	Report	Oosting 26'	Stadium: Sportpark De Toekomst

24 March 2021	Ajax (Netherlands)	2–1	(Netherlands) FC Utrecht	Duivendrecht, Netherlands
12:00 CEST	Fitz-Jim 9'; Idrissi 40'	Report	Mokono 45'	Stadium: Sportpark De Toekomst

== Competitions ==
=== Overview ===
Competition	First match	Last match	Starting round	Final position	Record							
Competition	First match	Last match	Starting round	Final position	Pld	W	D	L	GF	GA	GD	Win %
Eredivisie	13 September 2020	16 May 2021	Matchday 1	Winners	34	28	4	2	102	23	+79	82.35
KNVB Cup	16 December 2020	18 April 2021	Second round	Winners	5	5	0	0	13	6	+7	100.00
Champions League	21 October 2020	9 December 2020	Group stage	Group stage	6	2	1	3	7	7	+0	33.33
Europa League	18 February 2021	15 April 2021	Round of 32	Quarter-finals	6	4	1	1	11	5	+6	66.67
Total					51	39	6	6	133	41	+92	76.47

Last updated: 16 May 2021
Source: Competitions

=== Eredivisie ===
==== League table ====
Pos	Team	Pld	W	D	L	GF	GA	GD	Pts	Qualification or relegation
1	Ajax (C)	34	28	4	2	102	23	+79	88	Qualification for the Champions League group stage
2	PSV Eindhoven	34	21	9	4	74	35	+39	72	Qualification for the Champions League second qualifying round
3	AZ	34	21	8	5	75	41	+34	71	Qualification for the Europa League play-off round
4	Vitesse	34	18	7	9	52	38	+14	61	Qualification for the Europa Conference League third qualifying round
5	Feyenoord (O)	34	16	11	7	64	36	+28	59	Qualification for the European competition play-offs (Note: Winner of play-off will qualify to Europa Conference League second qualifying round.)

Source: Eredivisie, Soccerway
Rules for classification: Season in progress: 1) Most points won; 2) Less points lost; 3) Goal difference; 4) Goals scored; 5) Alphabetical order; End of season: 1) Points; 2) Goal difference; 3) Goals scored; 4) Head-to-head points; 5) Head-to-head goal difference; 6) Head-to-head away goals scored; 7) Play-off if relevant for deciding champion, relegation or participating in a European league, otherwise by draw. 8) Penalty shoot-out (only after a play-off)
(C) Champions; (O) Play-off winners

==== Results summary ====
Overall								Home						Away					
Pld	W	D	L	GF	GA	GD	Pts	W	D	L	GF	GA	GD	W	D	L	GF	GA	GD
34	28	4	2	102	23	+79	88	14	2	1	53	14	+39	14	2	1	49	9	+40

Last updated: 16 May 2021.
Source: Eredivisie

==== Results by round ====
Round	1	2	3	4	5	6	7	8	9	10	11	12	13	14	15	16	17	18	19	20	21	22	23	24	25	26	27	28	29	30	31	32	33	34
Ground	A	H	H	A	H	A	H	A	H	A	H	H	A	A	H	A	H	A	H	A	H	A	H	A	H	A	H	A	A	H	H	A	H	A
Result	W	W	W	L	W	W	W	W	W	W	L	W	W	D	D	W	W	W	W	W	D	W	W	D	W	W	W	W	W	W	W	W	W	W
Position	7	2	1	5	2	1	1	1	1	1	1	1	1	1	1	1	1	1	1	1	1	1	1	1	1	1	1	1	1	1	1	1	1	1

Updated to match(es) played on 16 May 2021. Source: Eredivisie
A = Away; H = Home; W = Win; D = Draw; L = Loss

==== Matches ====
13 September 2020 1	Sparta Rotterdam	0–1	Ajax	Rotterdam
14:30 CEST	Heylen (yellow card) 54'; Pinto (yellow card) 57'	Report	Gravenberch (yellow card) 17'; Tagliafico (red card) 27'; Blind (yellow card) 28'; Antony 37'; Onana (yellow card) 86'	Stadium: Het Kasteel; Attendance: 3,934; Referee: Jochem Kamphuis

20 September 2020 2	Ajax	3–0	RKC Waalwijk	Amsterdam
16:45 CEST	Tadić 10'; Kudus (yellow card) 29'; Labyad 34'; Martínez 73'	Report	Wouters (red card) 68'	Stadium: Johan Cruyff Arena; Attendance: 11,948; Referee: Bas Nijhuis

26 September 2020 3	Ajax	2–1	Vitesse	Amsterdam
21:00 CEST	Schuurs (yellow card) 10'; Promes 21'; Álvarez (red card) 44'; Blind (yellow card) 45+1'; Antony 70'; Tagliafico (yellow card) 89'	Report	Bruns (yellow card) 35'; Hájek (yellow card) 45+3'; Bazoer 56'; Wittek (yellow card) 81'; Tannane (yellow card) 82'	Stadium: Johan Cruyff Arena; Attendance: 12,176; Referee: Pol van Boekel

4 October 2020 4	FC Groningen	1–0	Ajax	Groningen
12:15 CEST	Balk 49'	Report	Gravenberch (yellow card) 60'	Stadium: Hitachi Capital Mobility Stadion; Attendance: 0 Referee: Dennis Higler

18 October 2020 5	Ajax	5–1	SC Heerenveen	Amsterdam
14:30 CEST	Tadić 4', 28' (pen.); Kudus 35'; Klaassen 72' (pen.); Martínez (yellow card) 84'; Antony 87'	Report	H. Veerman 66'; Kongolo (yellow card) 71'; Van Hecke (yellow card) 74'	Stadium: Johan Cruyff Arena; Attendance: 0 Referee: Björn Kuipers

24 October 2020 6	VVV-Venlo	0–13	Ajax	Venlo
16:30 CEST	Post (yellow card) 18'; Kum (red card) 52'	Report	Ekkelenkamp 12', 57'; Traoré 17', 32', 54', 65', 87'; Tadić 45'; Antony 55'; Blind 59'; Huntelaar 74' (pen.), 76'; Martínez 79'	Stadium: Covebo Stadion – De Koel; Attendance: 0 Referee: Danny Makkelie

31 October 2020 7	Ajax	5–2	Fortuna Sittard	Amsterdam
20:00 CET	Klaassen (penalty missed) 32', 32', 45'; Brobbey 74'; Tadić 86' (pen.); Promes 90+5' (pen.)	Report	Cox 7', 90+6'; Angha (yellow card) 85'	Stadium: Johan Cruyff Arena; Attendance: 0 Referee: Siemen Mulder

8 November 2020 8	FC Utrecht	0–3	Ajax	Utrecht
12:15 CET		Report	Klaassen 62'; Tadić (yellow card) 65', (goal) 71' (pen.); Promes 90+1'	Stadium: Stadion Galgenwaard; Attendance: 0 Referee: Björn Kuipers

22 November 2020 9	Ajax	5–0	Heracles Almelo	Amsterdam
12:15 CET	Traoré 6'; Neres 29'; Labyad 36', 77'; Tadić 57'	Report	Schoofs (yellow card) 8'; Vloet (yellow card) 39'; Bijleveld (yellow card) 72'	Stadium: Johan Cruyff Arena; Attendance: 0 Referee: Jeroen Manschot

28 November 2020 10	FC Emmen	0–5	Ajax	Emmen
18:45 CET		Report	Klaassen 20'; Labyad 29'; Traoré 38'; Ekkelenkamp 69'; Klaiber (yellow card) 79'; Promes 82'	Stadium: De Oude Meerdijk; Attendance: 0 Referee: Serdar Gözübüyük

5 December 2020 11	Ajax	1–2	FC Twente	Amsterdam
20:00 CET	Tadić 59' (pen.); Gravenberch (yellow card) 83'	Report	Menig 22', 84'	Stadium: Johan Cruyff Arena; Attendance: 0 Referee: Allard Lindhout

12 December 2020 12	Ajax	4–0	PEC Zwolle	Amsterdam
20:00 CET	Huntelaar 7'; Promes 11'; Antony 35'; Gravenberch 90+2'	Report		Stadium: Johan Cruyff Arena; Attendance: 0 Referee: Pol van Boekel

20 December 2020 13	ADO Den Haag	2–4	Ajax	The Hague
14:30 CET	Kramer 49'; Bourard 70'	Report	Tadić 20'; Huntelaar 22', 32'; Labyad 30'	Stadium: Cars Jeans Stadion; Attendance: 0 Referee: Bas Nijhuis

23 December 2020 14	Willem II	1–1	Ajax	Tilburg
18:45 CET	Wriedt 54'	Report	Antony 4', (yellow card) 66'	Stadium: Koning Willem II Stadion; Attendance: 0 Referee: Jeroen Manschot

10 January 2021 15	Ajax	2–2	PSV	Amsterdam
16:45 CET	Promes 40'; Klaassen (yellow card) 53'; Antony 65'	Report	Zahavi 2', 21', (yellow card) 81'	Stadium: Johan Cruyff Arena; Attendance: 0 Referee: Björn Kuipers

14 January 2021 16	FC Twente	1–3	Ajax	Enschede
20:00 CET	Rots (yellow card) 81'; Pleguezuelo 84'	Report	Haller 7'; Huntelaar 90', 90+1'	Stadium: De Grolsch Veste; Attendance: 0 Referee: Pol van Boekel

17 January 2021 17	Ajax	1–0	Feyenoord	Amsterdam
16:45 CET	Gravenberch 22'	Report		Stadium: Johan Cruyff Arena; Attendance: 0 Referee: Danny Makkelie

24 January 2021 18	Fortuna Sittard	1–2	Ajax	Sittard
12:15 CET	Tirpan 48'; Polter (red card) 90+3'	Report	Polter 19' (o.g.); Tagliafico (yellow card) 45+2'; Haller 64'; Neres (yellow card) 90+6'	Stadium: Fortuna Sittard Stadion; Attendance: 0 Referee: Dennis Higler

28 January 2021 19	Ajax	3–1	Willem II	Amsterdam
21:00 CET	Klaassen 51'; Brobbey 83'; Tadić 87'; Schuurs (yellow card) 89'; Blind (yellow card) 90+2'	Report	Pavlidis 62'	Stadium: Johan Cruyff Arena; Attendance: 0 Referee: Siemen Mulder

31 January 2021 20	AZ	0–3	Ajax	Alkmaar
16:45 CET		Report	Antony 14'; Klaassen 60'; Neres 90+4'	Stadium: AFAS Stadion; Attendance: 0 Referee: Bas Nijhuis

13 February 2021 22	Heracles Almelo	0–2	Ajax	Almelo
18:45 CET	Quagliata (yellow card) 84'	Report	Klaassen 14'; Haller (yellow card) 66', (goal) 79'	Stadium: Erve Asito; Attendance: 0 Referee: Kevin Blom
Note: The game has been moved for an earlier start due to severe winter conditions.

21 February 2021 23	Ajax	4–2	Sparta Rotterdam	Amsterdam
20:00 CET	Haller 14', 37'; Schuurs 45+4'; Kudus 50'	Report	Gravenberch 53', 90+1'; Heylen (yellow card) 55'	Stadium: Johan Cruyff Arena; Attendance: 0 Referee: Jeroen Manschot

28 February 2021 24	PSV	1–1	Ajax	Eindhoven
14:30 CET	Zahavi 39', (yellow card) 87'; Boscagli (yellow card) 54'; Malen (yellow card) 89'; Dumfries (yellow card) 90+1'; Teze (yellow card) 90+4'	Report	Álvarez (yellow card) 38'; Tadić 90+2' (pen.)	Stadium: Philips Stadion; Attendance: 0 Referee: Danny Makkelie

7 March 2021 25	Ajax	3–1	FC Groningen	Amsterdam
12:15 CET	Gravenberch 5'; Kudus (yellow card) 48'; Haller 54'; Tadić 77' (pen.); Klaassen (yellow card) 83'	Report	Te Wierik (yellow card) 73'; El Messaoudi 84'	Stadium: Johan Cruyff Arena; Attendance: 0 Referee: Dennis Higler

14 March 2021 26	PEC Zwolle	0–2	Ajax	Zwolle
20:00 CET	Dean Huiberts (yellow card) 62'	Report	Neres 28'; Tagliafico 38'; Haller (yellow card) 90+1'	Stadium: MAC³PARK Stadion; Attendance: 0 Referee: Pol van Boekel
Note: The game has been moved for a later start due to the participation of Ajax on the Round of 16 of the 2020–21 UEFA Europa League this Thursday.

21 March 2021 27	Ajax	5–0	ADO Den Haag	Amsterdam
16:45 CET	Rensch 11'; Brobbey 21'; Álvarez 32'; Tadić 44'; Klaassen 50'	Report		Stadium: Johan Cruyff Arena; Attendance: 0 Referee: Allard Lindhout

4 April 2021 28	SC Heerenveen	1–2	Ajax	Heerenveen
16:45 CEST	Van Bergen 27'	Report	Tadić 36' (pen.); Haller 61'; Tagliafico (yellow card) 86'	Stadium: Abe Lenstra Stadion; Attendance: 0 Referee: Jochem Kamphuis

11 April 2021 29	RKC Waalwijk	0–1	Ajax	Waalwijk
16:45 CEST		Report	Haller 14'; Álvarez (yellow card) 40'; Martínez (yellow card) 73'	Stadium: Mandemakers Stadion; Attendance: 0 Referee: Bas Nijhuis

22 April 2021 21	Ajax	1–1	FC Utrecht	Amsterdam
20:00 CEST	Kudus (yellow card) 53'; Álvarez 70'; Tagliafico (yellow card) 87'	Report	Gustafson 13' (pen.)	Stadium: Johan Cruyff Arena; Attendance: 0 Referee: Allard Lindhout
Note: The game was originally scheduled for 7 February, but it has been postponed due to severe winter conditions. On 25 March announced the Dutch football federation that the game was rescheduled for the 22 April.

25 April 2021 30	Ajax	2–0	AZ	Amsterdam
20:00 CEST	Klaassen 66', 90'	Report	Karlsson (yellow card) 42'	Stadium: Johan Cruyff Arena; Attendance: 7,500; Referee: Pol van Boekel

2 May 2021 31	Ajax	4–0	FC Emmen	Amsterdam
14:30 CEST	Timber 10'; Álvarez (yellow card) 57'; Haller 61'; Tagliafico (yellow card) 65'; Rensch 66'; Klaassen 74'	Report	Cavlan (yellow card) 14'; Vlak (yellow card) 61'	Stadium: Johan Cruyff Arena; Attendance: 0 Referee: Kevin Blom

9 May 2021 32	Feyenoord	0–3	Ajax	Rotterdam
14:30 CEST	Fer (yellow card) 14', (penalty missed) 45+2'; Malacia (yellow card) 38' (yellow-red card) 60'	Report	Senesi 21' (o.g.); Álvarez (yellow card) 44', (red card) 45+1'; Haps 67' (o.g.); Martínez (yellow card) 79'; Kudus 79'	Stadium: De Kuip; Attendance: 0 Referee: Danny Makkelie

13 May 2021 33	Ajax	3–1	VVV-Venlo	Amsterdam
14:30 CEST	Rensch 10'; Martínez (yellow card) 49'; Taylor (red card) 53'; Haller 57'; Kudus 77'	Report	Giakoumakis (yellow card) 44', (goal) 76'	Stadium: Johan Cruyff Arena; Attendance: 0 Referee: Dennis Higler

16 May 2021 34	Vitesse	1–3	Ajax	Arnhem
14:30 CEST	Hájek (yellow card) 23'; Openda 44'	Report	Haller 12'; Antony (yellow card) 25', (goal) 43'; Martínez 75'; Neres (yellow card) 84'	Stadium: GelreDome; Attendance: 0 Referee: Serdar Gözübüyük

=== KNVB Cup ===
16 December 2020 Second round	Ajax	5–4	FC Utrecht	Amsterdam
21:00 CET	Tadić 8', 89', (yellow card) 26'; Labyad 45+1', 81'; St. Jago 54' (o.g.); Tagliafico (yellow card) 60'; Schuurs (yellow card) 82'; Gravenberch (yellow card) 90+1'	Report	Mahi 1', 47'; Van Overeem (yellow card) 53'; Van de Streek 55'; Sylla 70'; Boussaid (yellow card) 77'	Stadium: Johan Cruyff Arena; Attendance: 0 Referee: Dennis Higler

20 January 2021 Round of 16	AZ	0–1	Ajax	Alkmaar
21:00 CET	Guðmundsson (yellow card) 69'; Koopmeiners (yellow card) 74'	Report	Labyad 34'; Rensch (yellow card) 41'; Klaassen (yellow card) 84'; Gravenberch (yellow card) 90+3'	Stadium: AFAS Stadion; Attendance: 0 Referee: Jochem Kamphuis

10 February 2021 Quarter-finals	Ajax	2–1	PSV	Amsterdam
20:00 CET	Haller 19', 24'; Tagliafico (yellow card) 64'; Rensch (yellow card) 64'; Álvarez (yellow card) 89'	Report	Teze (yellow card) 26'; Timber 58' (o.g.); Zahavi (yellow card) 82'; Malen (yellow card) 89'	Stadium: Johan Cruyff Arena; Attendance: 0 Referee: Serdar Gözübüyük
Note: The game has been moved an hour earlier due to severe winter conditions.

3 March 2021 Semi-finals	SC Heerenveen	0–3	Ajax	Heerenveen
21:00 CET		Report	Klaassen 19'; Tadić 63' (pen.); Neres 77'	Stadium: Abe Lenstra Stadion; Attendance: 0 Referee: Bas Nijhuis

18 April 2021 Final	Ajax	2–1	Vitesse	Rotterdam
18:00 CEST	Gravenberch 23'; Neres 90+1'; Tagliafico (yellow card) 90+5'	Report	Openda 30'; Tannane (yellow card) 63'; Touré (yellow card) 72'; Wittek (yellow card) 74'; Rasmussen (red card) 86'; Bero (yellow card) 90+3'	Stadium: De Kuip; Attendance: 0 Referee: Björn Kuipers

=== UEFA Champions League ===
==== Group stage ====
The group stage draw was held on 1 October 2020.

Pos	Team	Pld	W	D	L	GF	GA	GD	Pts	Qualification	LIV	ATA	AJX	MID
1	(England) Liverpool	6	4	1	1	10	3	+7	13	Advance to knockout phase	—	0–2	1–0	2–0
2	(Italy) Atalanta	6	3	2	1	10	8	+2	11	Advance to knockout phase	0–5	—	2–2	1–1
3	(Netherlands) Ajax	6	2	1	3	7	7	0	7	Transfer to Europa League	0–1	0–1	—	3–1
4	(Denmark) Midtjylland	6	0	2	4	4	13	−9	2		1–1	0–4	1–2	—

Source: UEFA
Rules for classification: Group stage tiebreakers

21 October 2020 1	Ajax (Netherlands)	0–1	(England) Liverpool	Amsterdam, Netherlands
21:00 CEST (UTC+2)	Promes (yellow card) 90+3'	Report	Tagliafico 35' (o.g.); Milner (yellow card) 38'; Alexander-Arnold (yellow card) 80'	Stadium: Johan Cruyff Arena; Attendance: 0 Referee: Felix Brych (Germany)

27 October 2020 2	Atalanta (Italy)	2–2	(Netherlands) Ajax	Bergamo, Italy
21:00 CET (UTC+1)	Iličić (yellow card) 23'; Zapata 54', 60'; Djimsiti (yellow card) 66'; Malinovskyi (yellow card) 90+1'	Report	Traoré (yellow card) 6', (goal) 38'; Klaassen (yellow card) 20'; Mazraoui (yellow card) 25'; Tadić 30' (pen.)	Stadium: Gewiss Stadium; Attendance: 0 Referee: Damir Skomina (Slovenia)

3 November 2020 3	Midtjylland (Denmark)	1–2	(Netherlands) Ajax	Herning, Denmark
21:00 CET (UTC+1)	Dreyer 18'; Vibe (yellow card) 84'	Report	Antony 1'; Tadić 13'; Schuurs (yellow card) 25'	Stadium: MCH Arena; Attendance: 132; Referee: Bobby Madden (Scotland)

25 November 2020 4	Ajax (Netherlands)	3–1	(Denmark) Midtjylland	Amsterdam, Netherlands
21:00 CET (UTC+1)	Neres (yellow card) 40', (goal) 66'; Gravenberch 47'; Mazraoui 49'	Report	Madsen (yellow card) 43'; Mabil 80' (pen.); Sviatchenko (red card) 90+1'	Stadium: Johan Cruyff Arena; Attendance: 0 Referee: Sergei Karasev (Russia)

1 December 2020 5	Liverpool (England)	1–0	(Netherlands) Ajax	Liverpool, England
21:00 CET (UTC+1)	Jones 58'; Wijnaldum (yellow card) 70'; Henderson (yellow card) 90+1'; Mané (yellow card) 90+2'	Report	Schuurs (yellow card) 42'; Blind (yellow card) 55'	Stadium: Anfield; Attendance: 0 Referee: Tobias Stieler (Germany)

9 December 2020 6	Ajax (Netherlands)	0–1	(Italy) Atalanta	Amsterdam, Netherlands
18:55 CET (UTC+1)	Gravenberch (yellow card) 22' (yellow-red card) 79'; Tagliafico (yellow card) 52'	Report	Hateboer (yellow card) 60'; Freuler (yellow card) 82'; Muriel 85'	Stadium: Johan Cruyff Arena; Attendance: 0 Referee: Carlos del Cerro Grande (Spain)

=== UEFA Europa League ===
==== Knockout phase ====
===== Round of 32 =====
The round of 32 draw was held on 14 December 2020.

18 February 2021 First leg	Lille (France)	1–2	(Netherlands) Ajax	Villeneuve-d'Ascq, France
21:00 CET	Çelik (yellow card) 17'; Yazıcı (yellow card) 40'; Weah 72'; Maignan (yellow card) 88'; Sanches (yellow card) 90+1'	Report	Álvarez (yellow card) 12'; Blind (yellow card) 66'; Rensch (yellow card) 77'; Tadić 87' (pen.); Brobbey 89', (yellow card) 90+5'	Stadium: Stade Pierre-Mauroy; Attendance: 0 Referee: Ivan Kružliak (Slovakia)

25 February 2021 Second leg	Ajax (Netherlands)	2–1 (4–2 agg.)	(France) Lille	Amsterdam, Netherlands
18:55 CET	Klaassen 15'; Timber (yellow card) 63'; Neres (yellow card) 85', (goal) 88'	Report	Maignan (yellow card) 15'; Djaló (yellow card) 59'; Sanches (yellow card) 66'; Yazıcı 78' (pen.); Fonte (yellow card) 78'	Stadium: Johan Cruyff Arena; Attendance: 0 Referee: Willie Collum (Scotland)

===== Round of 16 =====
The round of 16 draw was held on 26 February 2021.

11 March 2021 First leg	Ajax (Netherlands)	3–0	(Switzerland) Young Boys	Amsterdam, Netherlands
18:55 CET	Tagliafico (yellow card) 53'; Klaassen 62'; Tadić 82'; Brobbey 90+2'	Report	Lauper (yellow card) 49'; Aebischer (yellow card) 64'; Sierro (yellow card) 78'	Stadium: Johan Cruyff Arena; Attendance: 0 Referee: Marco Guida (Italy)

18 March 2021 Second leg	Young Boys (Switzerland)	0–2 (0–5 agg.)	(Netherlands) Ajax	Bern, Switzerland
21:00 CET	Camara (yellow card) 38'; Nsame (yellow card) 90+4'	Report	Neres 21'; Tadić 49' (pen.); Rensch (yellow card) 74'	Stadium: Stadion Wankdorf; Attendance: 0 Referee: Bobby Madden (Scotland)

===== Quarter-finals =====
The draw for the quarter-finals was held on 19 March 2021.

8 April 2021 First leg	Ajax (Netherlands)	1–2	(Italy) Roma	Amsterdam, Netherlands
21:00 CEST (UTC+2)	Klaassen 39'; Tadić (penalty missed) 53'; Rensch (yellow card) 71'; Martínez (yellow card) 86'	Report	Pellegrini 57'; Peres (yellow card) 78'; Ibañez 87'; Cristante (yellow card) 90'; Calafiori (yellow card) 90+4'	Stadium: Johan Cruyff Arena; Attendance: 0 Referee: Sergei Karasev (Russia)

15 April 2021 Second leg	Roma (Italy)	1–1 (3–2 agg.)	(Netherlands) Ajax	Rome, Italy
21:00 CEST (UTC+2)	Ibañez (yellow card) 43'; Veretout (yellow card) 67'; Mancini (yellow card) 68'; Džeko 72', (yellow card) 79'; Cristante (yellow card) 86'	Report	Brobbey 49'; Tagliafico (yellow card) 89'; Martínez (yellow card) 90+2'	Stadium: Stadio Olimpico; Attendance: 0 Referee: Anthony Taylor (England)

== Statistics ==
=== Appearances and goals ===
No.	Pos	Nat	Player	Total		Eredivisie		KNVB Cup		Champions League Europa League	
No.	Pos	Nat	Player	Apps	Goals	Apps	Goals	Apps	Goals	Apps	Goals
1	GK	(Netherlands) NED	Maarten Stekelenburg	21	0	12	0	4	0	5	0
2	DF	(Netherlands) NED	Jurriën Timber	30	1	16+4	1	3+1	0	5+1	0
3	DF	(Netherlands) NED	Perr Schuurs	41	1	20+7	1	3+1	0	6+4	0
4	DF	(Mexico) MEX	Edson Álvarez	39	2	18+6	2	5	0	7+3	0
5	DF	(Suriname) SUR	Sean Klaiber	22	0	6+9	0	0+1	0	1+5	0
6	MF	(Netherlands) NED	Davy Klaassen	46	16	27+2	12	4+1	1	11+1	3
7	FW	(Brazil) BRA	David Neres	39	8	10+15	3	1+3	2	10	3
8	MF	(Netherlands) NED	Ryan Gravenberch	47	5	31+1	3	4	1	11	1
9	FW	(Morocco) MAR	Oussama Idrissi	14	0	1+6	0	0+1	0	0+6	0
10	FW	(Serbia) SRB	Dušan Tadić	51	22	31+3	14	4+1	3	12	5
12	DF	(Morocco) MAR	Noussair Mazraoui	26	1	16+3	0	1	0	6	1
15	DF	(Netherlands) NED	Devyne Rensch	27	3	12+6	3	3+1	0	5	0
16	GK	(Netherlands) NED	Kjell Scherpen	4	0	2	0	1	0	1	0
17	DF	(Netherlands) NED	Daley Blind	34	1	23	1	3	0	8	0
18	MF	(Netherlands) NED	Jurgen Ekkelenkamp	23	3	4+11	3	1+3	0	1+3	0
19	MF	(Morocco) MAR	Zakaria Labyad	28	8	12+9	5	2	3	2+3	0
20	MF	(Ghana) GHA	Mohammed Kudus	22	4	8+9	4	0+1	0	1+3	0
21	DF	(Argentina) ARG	Lisandro Martínez	41	3	17+9	3	4+1	0	8+2	0
22	FW	(Ivory Coast) CIV	Sébastien Haller	23	13	18+1	11	3+1	2	0	0
23	FW	(Burkina Faso) BFA	Lassina Traoré	18	8	7+5	7	0	0	2+4	1
24	GK	(Cameroon) CMR	André Onana	26	0	20	0	0	0	6	0
25	MF	(Netherlands) NED	Kenneth Taylor	3	0	0+3	0	0	0	0	0
30	FW	(Netherlands) NED	Brian Brobbey	19	6	1+11	3	0	0	1+6	3
31	DF	(Argentina) ARG	Nicolás Tagliafico	40	1	25	1	4	0	11	0
33	GK	(Croatia) CRO	Dominik Kotarski	0	0	0	0	0	0	0	0
39	FW	(Brazil) BRA	Antony	46	10	24+8	9	4	0	10	1
Players sold or loaned out after the start of the season:
9	FW	(Netherlands) NED	Klaas-Jan Huntelaar	14	7	3+8	7	0	0	0+3	0
11	FW	(Netherlands) NED	Quincy Promes	25	6	10+9	6	1	0	1+4	0
26	MF	(Denmark) DEN	Victor Jensen	1	0	0+1	0	0	0	0	0
27	MF	(Netherlands) NED	Noa Lang	1	0	0+1	0	0	0	0	0
28	DF	(United States) USA	Sergiño Dest	3	0	0+3	0	0	0	0	0

Last updated: 16 May 2021
Source: Competitive matches

=== Goalscorers ===
Rank	No	Pos	Nat	Name	Eredivisie	KNVB Cup	Champions League	Europa League	Total
1	10	FW	(Serbia)	Dušan Tadić	14	3	2	3	22
2	6	MF	(Netherlands)	Davy Klaassen	12	1	0	3	16
3	22	FW	(Ivory Coast)	Sébastien Haller	11	2	0	0	13
4	39	FW	(Brazil)	Antony	9	0	1	0	10
5	7	FW	(Brazil)	David Neres	3	2	1	2	8
5	19	FW	(Morocco)	Zakaria Labyad	5	3	0	0	8
5	23	FW	(Burkina Faso)	Lassina Traoré	7	0	1	0	8
8	9	FW	(Netherlands)	Klaas-Jan Huntelaar	7	0	0	0	7
9	11	FW	(Netherlands)	Quincy Promes	6	0	0	0	6
9	30	FW	(Netherlands)	Brian Brobbey	3	0	0	3	6
11	8	MF	(Netherlands)	Ryan Gravenberch	3	1	1	0	5
12	20	MF	(Ghana)	Mohammed Kudus	4	0	0	0	4
13	15	DF	(Netherlands)	Devyne Rensch	3	0	0	0	3
13	18	MF	(Netherlands)	Jurgen Ekkelenkamp	3	0	0	0	3
13	21	DF	(Argentina)	Lisandro Martínez	3	0	0	0	3
16	4	DF	(Mexico)	Edson Álvarez	2	0	0	0	2
17	2	DF	(Netherlands)	Jurriën Timber	1	0	0	0	1
17	3	DF	(Netherlands)	Perr Schuurs	1	0	0	0	1
17	12	DF	(Morocco)	Noussair Mazraoui	0	0	1	0	1
17	17	DF	(Netherlands)	Daley Blind	1	0	0	0	1
17	31	DF	(Argentina)	Nicolás Tagliafico	1	0	0	0	1
Own goal					3	1	0	0	4
Totals					102	13	7	11	133

Last updated: 16 May 2021
Source: Competitive matches

=== Clean sheets ===
Rank	No	Pos	Nat	Name	Eredivisie	KNVB Cup	Champions League Europa League	Total
1	1	GK	(Netherlands)	Maarten Stekelenburg	6	2	2	10
2	24	GK	(Cameroon)	André Onana	9	0	0	9
3	16	GK	(Netherlands)	Kjell Scherpen	1	0	0	1
Total					16	2	2	20

Last updated: 16 May 2021
Source: Competitive matches

=== Disciplinary record ===
N	P	Nat.	Name	Eredivisie			KNVB Cup			Champions League; Europa League			Total			Notes
N	P	Nat.	Name	Yellow card	Second yellow card	Red card	Yellow card	Second yellow card	Red card	Yellow card	Second yellow card	Red card	Yellow card	Second yellow card	Red card	Notes
2	DF	(Netherlands)	Jurriën Timber							1			1			
3	DF	(Netherlands)	Perr Schuurs	2			1			2			5			
4	DF	(Mexico)	Edson Álvarez	4		2	1			1			6		2	
5	DF	(Netherlands)	Sean Klaiber	1									1			
6	MF	(Netherlands)	Davy Klaassen	2			1			1			4			
7	FW	(Brazil)	David Neres	2						2			4			
8	MF	(Netherlands)	Ryan Gravenberch	3			2			1	1		6	1		
10	FW	(Serbia)	Dušan Tadić	1			1						2			
11	FW	(Netherlands)	Quincy Promes							1			1			
12	DF	(Morocco)	Noussair Mazraoui							1			1			
15	DF	(Netherlands)	Devyne Rensch				2			3			5			
17	DF	(Netherlands)	Daley Blind	3						2			5			
20	MF	(Ghana)	Mohammed Kudus	3									3			
21	DF	(Argentina)	Lisandro Martínez	4						2			6			
22	FW	(Ivory Coast)	Sébastien Haller	2									2			
23	FW	(Burkina Faso)	Lassina Traoré							1			1			
24	GK	(Cameroon)	André Onana	1									1			
25	MF	(Netherlands)	Kenneth Taylor			1									1	
30	FW	(Netherlands)	Brian Brobbey							1			1			
31	DF	(Argentina)	Nicolás Tagliafico	4		1	3			3			10		1	
39	FW	(Brazil)	Antony	2									2			

Last updated: 16 May 2021
Source: Competitive matches
Only competitive matches
(yellow card) = Number of bookings; (second yellow card) = Number of sending offs after a second yellow card; (red card) = Number of sending offs by a direct red card.
