= Naoki Maeda (footballer, born 1994) =

Japanese footballer

Naoki Maeda 前田 直輝
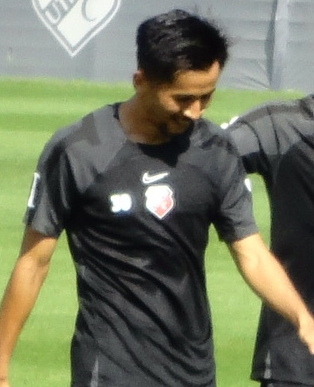
- Maeda in 2022 with FC Utrecht

Personal information
- Date of birth: 17 November 1994 (age 31)
- Place of birth: Saitama, Japan
- Height: 1.77 m (5 ft 10 in)
- Position: Winger

Team information
- Current team: Sanfrecce Hiroshima
- Number: 41

Youth career
- 2007–2012: Tokyo Verdy

Senior career*
Years	Team	Apps	(Gls)
2012–2015	Tokyo Verdy	48	(4)
2015	→ Matsumoto Yamaga FC (loan)	31	(3)
2015	→ J. League U-22 (loan)	2	(0)
2016–2017	Yokohama F. Marinos	32	(6)
2018	Matsumoto Yamaga FC	16	(3)
2018–2023	Nagoya Grampus	122	(26)
2022–2023	→ Utrecht (loan)	12	(0)
2024–2025	Urawa Red Diamonds	27	(2)
2025–	Sanfrecce Hiroshima	41	(1)
Medal record
Yokohama F. Marinos
Runner-up	Emperor's Cup	2017
- * Club domestic league appearances and goals as of 9 August 2026

Naoki Maeda (前田 直輝, Maeda Naoki; born 17 November 1994) is a Japanese professional footballer who plays as a winger for J1 League club Sanfrecce Hiroshima.

== Career ==
On 7 October 2012, Maeda was promoted to Tokyo Verdy's first team from the 2013 season. At the start of the 2014 season, he was made a vice-captain.

On 9 January 2015, Maeda was announced at J1 League club Matsumoto Yamaga on a one year loan deal.

On 30 December 2015, Maeda was announced at Yokohama F. Marinos on a permanent transfer. On the opening day of the 2017 season, he scored a goal to win the game in the 90th+2nd minute.

On 11 January 2018, Maeda was announced at Matsumoto Yamaga on a permanent transfer.

On 19 July 2018, Maeda was announced at Nagoya Grampus on a permanent transfer.

In January 2022 he was loaned to FC Utrecht of the Dutch Eredivisie on a six-month loan spell. He made his debut on 16 January 2022 in a match against AFC Ajax, starting on his debut and played for 11 minutes before being forced off due to a broken leg following a tackle from Ajax’s Lisandro Martínez. It was announced on 31 August 2022 that Utrecht signed Maeda on loan again for the 2022–23 season.

On June 30 2023, it was announced that Maeda returns to Grampus following the end of loan spell at Utrecht. He was subsequently given the number 25 shirt of the clubs' first-team.

In January 2024, Maeda transferred to Urawa Red Diamonds ahead of the 2024 season.

On 27 March 2025, Maeda was announced at Sanfrecce Hiroshima on a permanent transfer.

== Career statistics ==
As of 17 March 2024

Appearances and goals by club, season and competition
Club	Season	League			National cup (Note: Includes Emperor's Cup and KNVB Cup)		League cup (Note: Includes J. League Cup)		Continental (Note: Includes AFC Champions League)		Other		Total	
Club	Season	Division	Apps	Goals	Apps	Goals	Apps	Goals	Apps	Goals	Apps	Goals	Apps	Goals
Tokyo Verdy	2012	J.League Division 2	4	0	0	0	–		–		–		4	0
Tokyo Verdy	2013	J.League Division 2	18	1	0	0	–		–		–		18	1
Tokyo Verdy	2014	J.League Division 2	26	3	0	0	–		–		–		26	3
Tokyo Verdy	Total		48	4	0	0	0	0	0	0	0	0	48	4
Matsumoto Yamaga (loan)	2015	J1 League	31	3	3	1	3	1	–		–		37	5
J.League U-22 Selection (loan)	2015	J3 League	2	0	–		–		–		–		2	0
Yokohama F. Marinos	2016	J1 League	13	2	4	0	7	0	–		–		24	2
Yokohama F. Marinos	2017	J1 League	19	4	5	1	4	0	–		–		28	5
Yokohama F. Marinos	Total		32	6	9	1	11	0	0	0	0	0	52	7
Matsumoto Yamaga	2018	J2 League	16	3	2	0	–		–		–		18	3
Nagoya Grampus	2018	J1 League	18	7	0	0	0	0	–		–		18	7
Nagoya Grampus	2019	J1 League	29	9	1	0	10	1	–		–		40	10
Nagoya Grampus	2020	J1 League	30	7	0	0	3	0	–		–		33	7
Nagoya Grampus	2021	J1 League	34	3	3	0	5	1	8	1	–		50	5
Nagoya Grampus	2023	J1 League	11	0	1	0	4	0	–		–		16	0
Nagoya Grampus	Total		122	26	5	0	22	2	8	1	0	0	157	29
FC Utrecht (loan)	2021–22	Eredivisie	1	0	0	0	–		–		–		1	0
FC Utrecht (loan)	2022–23	Eredivisie	11	0	4	1	–		–		–		15	1
FC Utrecht (loan)	Total		12	0	4	1	0	0	0	0	0	0	16	1
Urawa Red Diamonds	2024	J1 League	3	1	–		0	0	–		–		3	1
Career total			266	43	23	3	36	3	8	1	0	0	333	50

== Honours ==
Nagoya Grampus

- J.League Cup: 2021
