= Taylor Booth (soccer) =

American soccer player

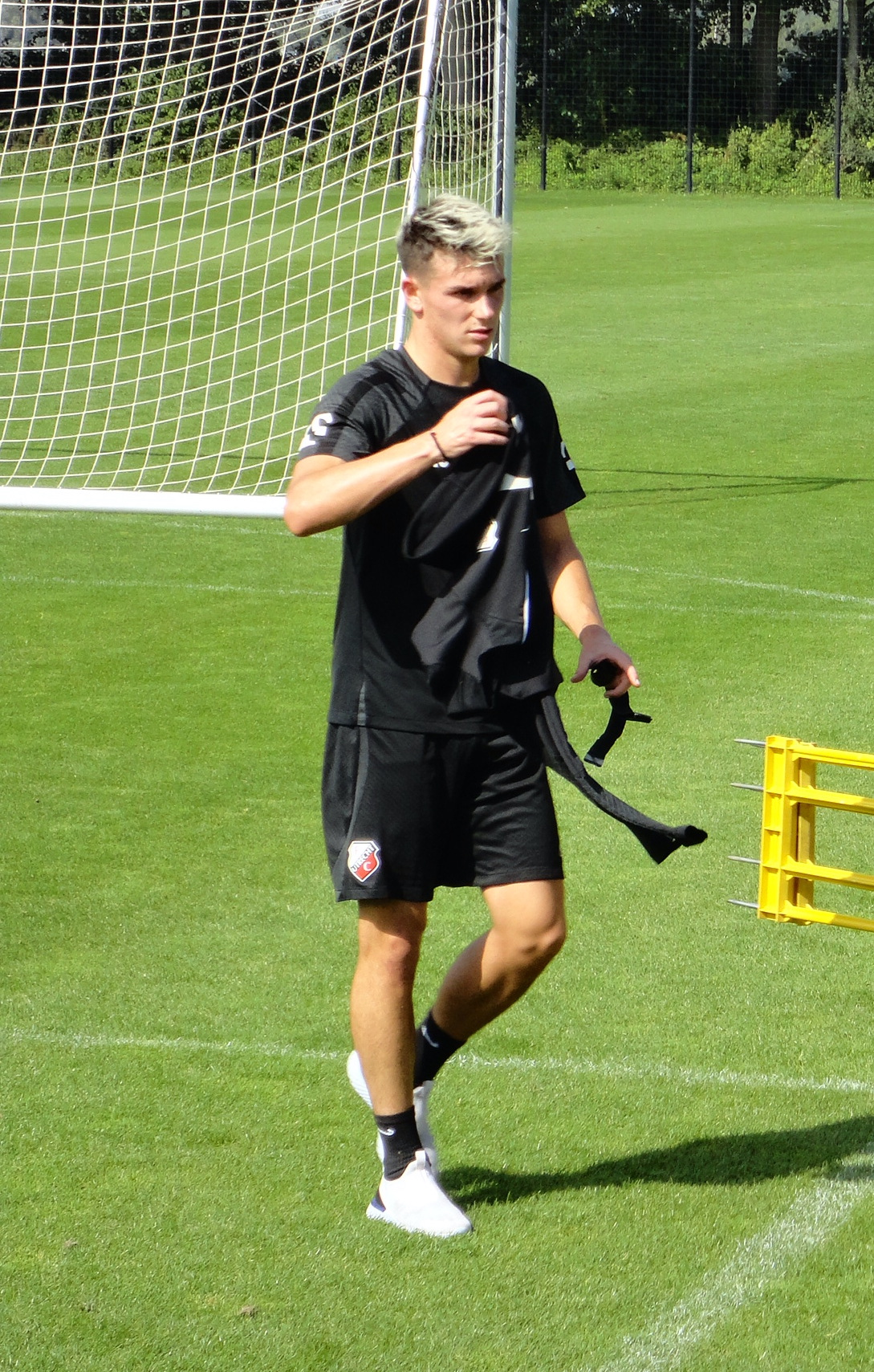
- Booth training with Utrecht in 2022

Personal information
- Full name: Taylor Anthony Booth
- Date of birth: May 31, 2001 (age 25)
- Place of birth: Eden, Utah, U.S.
- Height: 5 ft 9 in (1.74 m)
- Position: Midfielder

Team information
- Current team: Real Salt Lake (on loan from Twente)
- Number: 18

Youth career
- –2015: La Roca FC
- 2016–2018: Real Salt Lake
- 2019–2020: Bayern Munich

Senior career*
Years	Team	Apps	(Gls)
2020–2022	Bayern Munich II	27	(3)
2021–2022	Bayern Munich	0	(0)
2021	→ SKN St. Pölten (loan)	15	(3)
2022	Jong Utrecht	3	(0)
2022–2025	Utrecht	53	(7)
2025–	Twente	16	(0)
2026–	→ Real Salt Lake (loan)	3	(0)

International career^{‡}
2016	United States U16	7	(0)
2017	United States U17	13	(0)
2018	United States U18	3	(0)
2018	United States U19	2	(1)
2023–2024	United States U23	8	(0)
2023	United States	2	(0)
- * Club domestic league appearances and goals as of October 12, 2026 ‡ National team caps and goals as of August 2, 2024

Taylor Anthony Booth (born May 31, 2001) is an American professional soccer player who plays as a midfielder for Major League Soccer club Real Salt Lake, on loan from Eredivisie club Twente.

== Club career ==
=== Youth career ===
Booth joined the Bayern Munich youth team from the Real Salt Lake youth academy in January 2019. He made his professional debut for Bayern Munich II in the 3. Liga on June 14, 2020, coming on as a substitute in the 73rd minute for Malik Tillman in the away match against Waldhof Mannheim, which finished as a 3–2 win. He finished the 2019–20 season with two appearances. He also made two appearances for the reserve team during the 2020–21 season before being loaned out to SKN St. Pölten.

==== Loan to SKN St. Pölten ====
On February 8, 2021, Booth was loaned to Austrian side SKN St. Pölten until the end of the season.

=== Bayern Munich ===
On August 25, he was promoted to Bayern Munich's senior squad for their 2021–22 DFB-Pokal first round fixture against Bremer SV. He came as a substitute in the second half and played 22 minutes in the 12–0 victory.

=== Utrecht ===
On January 28, 2022, Booth signed a pre-contract with Eredivisie club Utrecht to join the team as a free agent in the summer.

After scoring a goal in both of Utrecht's league matches during November 2022, Booth was named the November Eredivisie Player of the Month.

Booth scored his first goals of the following league campaign by way of a hat-trick, the first of his career, against FC Volendam on February 4, 2024; his brother, Zach, also scored in the match.

=== Twente ===
On February 4, 2025, Booth signed a three-and-a-half-year contract with Twente.

==== Loan to Real Salt Lake ====
On September 2, 2026, Booth returned to Real Salt Lake on loan.

== International career ==
Booth has represented the United States at a number of youth levels, from under-15 to under-19. Most notably, he was included in the United States squad for the 2017 FIFA U-17 World Cup in India. He made two appearances in the tournament, helping his team to the quarter-finals before losing 4–1 to eventual champions England. On December 3, 2021, he was called up for the first time to the United States senior team for the friendly match against Bosnia and Herzegovina on December 18, though he did not make an appearance. Booth got his first cap on March 24, 2023, in a CONCACAF Nations League match against Grenada.

On October 8, 2023, Booth was called up to the United States under-23 national team ahead of friendlies against Mexico and Japan.

== Personal life ==
Booth was born in Eden, Utah, to Kelli (née Carver) and Chad Booth, both collegiate soccer players. Through his father's Italian heritage, he was able to obtain an Italian passport, allowing him to move to Germany at 17. Booth was born with torticollis, which required physical therapy as an infant. He is a member of the Church of Jesus Christ of Latter-day Saints. His younger brother, Zach, plays for Excelsior Rotterdam.

== Career statistics ==
=== Club ===
As of match played April 10, 2026

Appearances and goals by club, season and competition
Club	Season	League			National cup (Note: Includes DFB-Pokal, KNVB Cup)		Continental		Other		Total	
Club	Season	Division	Apps	Goals	Apps	Goals	Apps	Goals	Apps	Goals	Apps	Goals
Bayern Munich II	2019–20	3. Liga	2	0	—		—		—		2	0
Bayern Munich II	2020–21	3. Liga	2	0	—		—		—		2	0
Bayern Munich II	2021–22	Regionalliga Bayern	23	3	—		—		—		23	3
Bayern Munich II	Total		27	3	—		—		—		27	3
SKN St. Pölten (loan)	2020–21	Austrian Bundesliga	15	3	—		—		—		15	3
Bayern Munich	2021–22	Bundesliga	—		1	0	—		—		1	0
Utrecht	2022–23	Eredivisie	25	2	3	0	—		—		28	2
Utrecht	2023–24	Eredivisie	19	5	2	1	—		—		21	6
Utrecht	2024–25	Eredivisie	9	0	—		—		—		9	0
Utrecht	Total		53	7	5	1	—		—		58	8
Twente	2024–25	Eredivisie	6	0	—		1 (Note: Appearances in UEFA Europa League)	0	—		7	0
Twente	2025–26	Eredivisie	10	0	1	0	—		—		11	0
Twente	Total		16	0	1	0	1	0	—		18	0
Career total			111	13	7	1	1	0	0	0	119	14

=== International ===
As of match played March 27, 2023

Appearances and goals by national team and year
National team	Year	Apps	Goals
United States	2023	2	0
Total		2	0

== Honors ==
Bayern Munich II

- 3. Liga: 2019–20

United States

- CONCACAF Nations League: 2022–23

Individual

- Eredivisie Player of the Month: November 2022,
- Eredivisie Team of the Month: November 2022
