= Eredivisie Player of the Month =

Award for the best player of the month in the Eredivisie

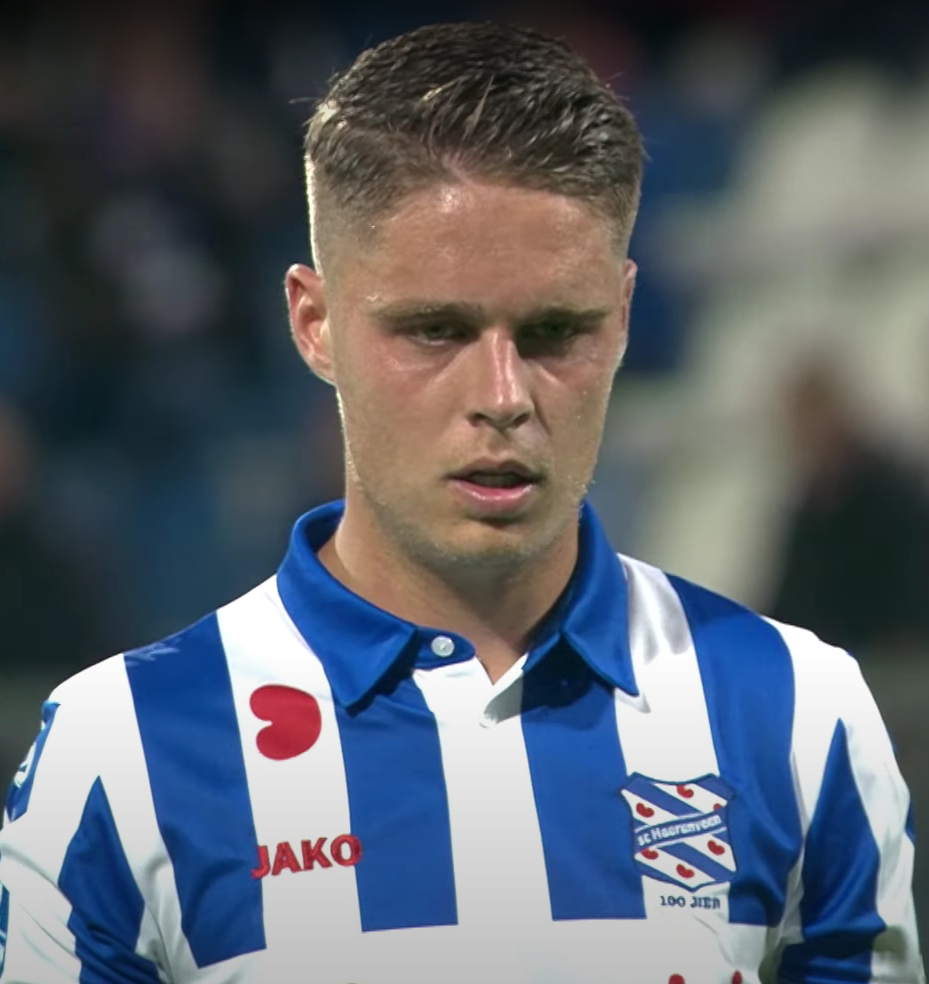
Joey Veerman has won the award a record four times.

The Eredivisie Player of the Month is an association football award that recognises the best adjudged Eredivisie player each month of the season.

The Eredivisie Player of the Month award is based on statistics (Stats Perform) and votes from football fans, cast via the KPN Man of the Match vote (ESPN). These elements also count towards the Eredivisie Player of the Year and Johan Cruyff Talent of the Year Awards, which are presented in a live broadcast on ESPN at the end of the season. The Eredivisie Player of the Month vote is an initiative of the Eredivisie CV in collaboration with ESPN.

Joey Veerman has been named player of the month a record four times, with Steven Berghuis and Brian Brobbey each having won the award three times. Five players have won the award in consecutive months: Orkun Kökçü, Oussama Idrissi, Cody Gakpo, Brobbey and Veerman.

As of September 2026, the most recent recipient of the award is Feyenoord player Anis Hadj Moussa.

== Key ==
- Players marked † shared the award with another player.
- Position key: GK – Goalkeeper; DF – Defender; MF – Midfielder; FW – Forward.

== List of winners ==
Contents
2017–18 · 2018–19 · 2019–20 · 2020–21 · 2021–22 · 2022–23 · 2023–24 · 2024–25 · 2025–26 · 2026–27

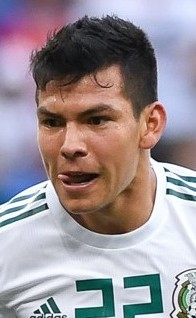
Hirving Lozano won the first Player of the Month award in August 2017.

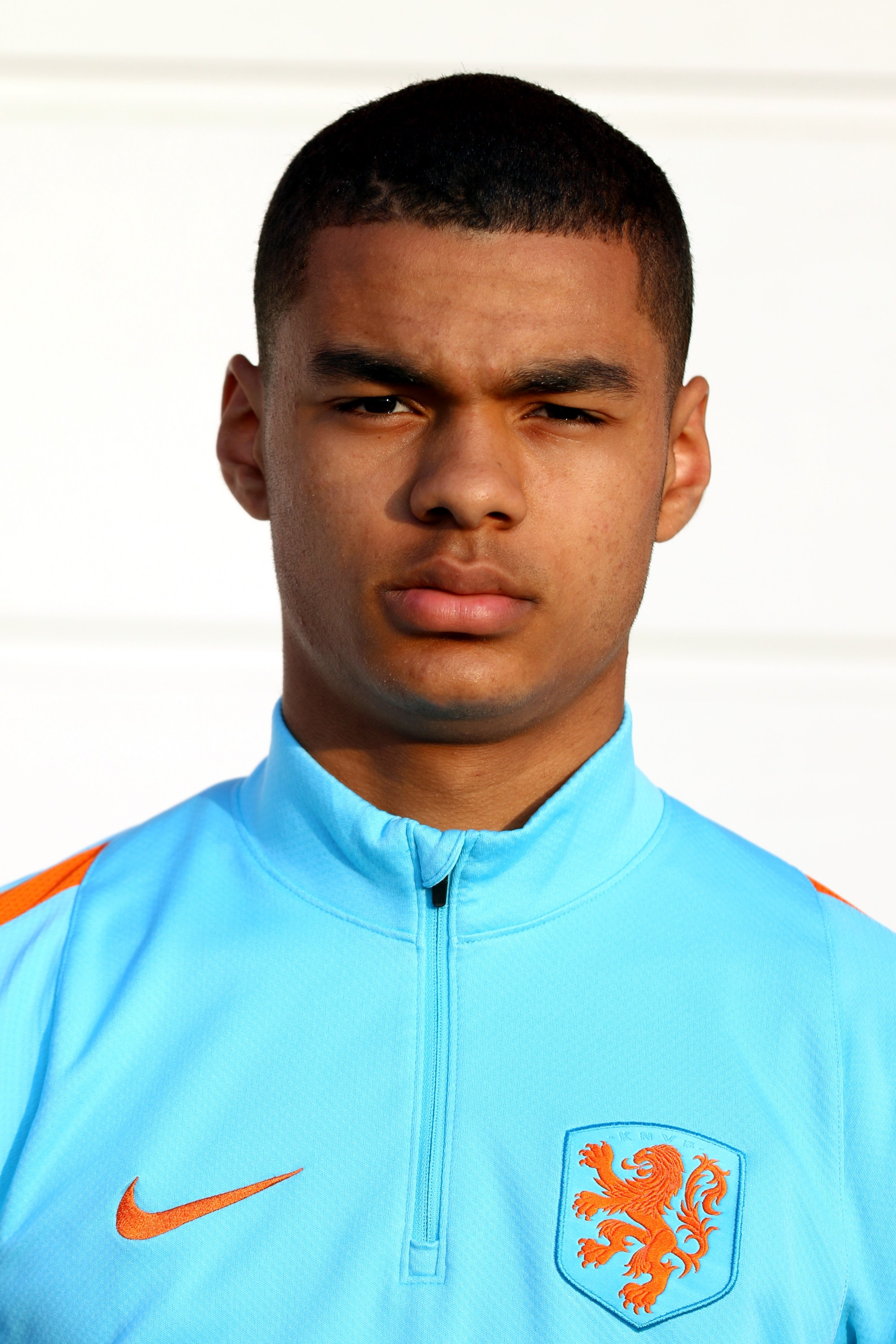
Cody Gakpo won the award twice in a row.

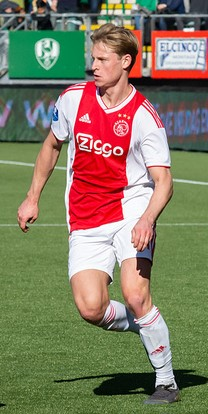
Frenkie de Jong won the award twice.

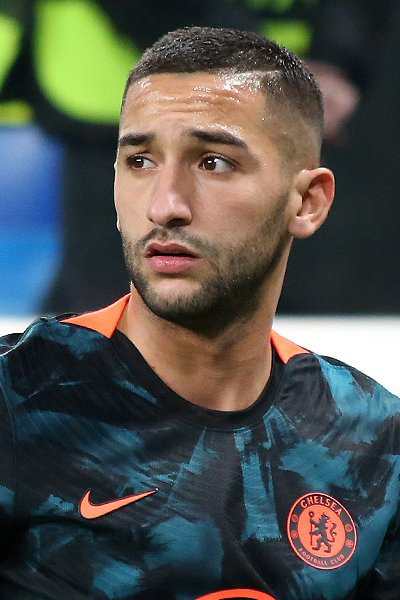
Hakim Ziyech was the first player from Africa to win the award.

Month	Year (Note: Each year in the table is linked to the article about the corresponding football season.)	Player	Nationality	Pos.	Club	Ref.
August	2017	Hirving Lozano	Mexico	FW	PSV	
September	2017	Steven Berghuis	Netherlands	MF	Feyenoord	
October	2017	Gastón Pereiro	Uruguay	MF	PSV	
November	2017	Zakaria Labyad	Netherlands	MF	Utrecht	
December	2017	Steven Berghuis	Netherlands	MF	Feyenoord	
January	2018	Jonas Svensson	Norway	DF	AZ	
February	2018	Steven Bergwijn	Netherlands	FW	PSV	
March	2018	Santiago Arias	Colombia	DF	PSV	
April	2018	David Neres	Brazil	FW	Ajax	
August	2018	Robin van Persie	Netherlands	FW	Feyenoord	
September	2018	Kristoffer Peterson	Sweden	FW	Heracles Almelo	
October	2018	Hakim Ziyech	Morocco	MF	Ajax	
November	2018	Nicolás Tagliafico	Argentina	DF	Ajax	
December	2018	Frenkie de Jong	Netherlands	MF	Ajax	
January	2019	Patrick Joosten	Netherlands	FW	VVV-Venlo	
February	2019	Frenkie de Jong	Netherlands	MF	Ajax	
March	2019	Dušan Tadić	Serbia	FW	Ajax	
April	2019	Martin Ødegaard	Norway	MF	Vitesse	
May	2019	Elías Már Ómarsson	Iceland	FW	Excelsior	
August	2019	Hakim Ziyech	Morocco	MF	Ajax	
September	2019	Donyell Malen	Netherlands	FW	PSV	
October	2019	Adam Maher	Netherlands	MF	Utrecht	
November	2019	Cyriel Dessers	Nigeria	FW	Heracles Almelo	
December	2019	Oussama Idrissi	Morocco	FW	AZ	
January	2020	Oussama Idrissi	Morocco	FW	AZ	
February	2020	Thorsten Kirschbaum	Germany	MF	VVV-Venlo	
September	2020	Clint Leemans	Netherlands	MF	PEC Zwolle	
October	2020	Lassina Traoré	Burkina Faso	FW	Ajax	
November	2020	Davy Klaassen	Netherlands	MF	Ajax	
December	2020	Antony	Brazil	FW	Ajax	
January	2021	Giorgos Giakoumakis	Greece	FW	VVV-Venlo	
February	2021	Donyell Malen	Netherlands	FW	PSV	
March	2021	Ryan Gravenberch	Netherlands	MF	Ajax	
April	2021	Justin Bijlow	Netherlands	GK	Feyenoord	
May	2021	Owen Wijndal	Netherlands	DF	AZ	
August	2021	Bruma	Portugal	FW	PSV	
September	2021	Guus Til	Netherlands	MF	Feyenoord	
October	2021	Luuk Brouwers	Netherlands	MF	Go Ahead Eagles	
November	2021	Ibrahim Sangaré	Ivory Coast	MF	PSV	
December	2021	Jesper Karlsson	Sweden	FW	AZ	
January	2022	Orkun Kökçü	Turkey	MF	Feyenoord	
February	2022	Orkun Kökçü	Turkey	MF	Feyenoord	
March	2022	Eran Zahavi	Israel	FW	PSV	
April	2022	Davy Klaassen	Netherlands	MF	Ajax	
May	2022	Loïs Openda	Belgium	FW	Vitesse	
August	2022	Xavi Simons	Netherlands	MF	PSV	
September	2022	Cody Gakpo	Netherlands	FW	PSV	
October	2022	Cody Gakpo	Netherlands	FW	PSV	
November	2022	Taylor Booth	United States	MF	Utrecht	
January	2023	Nick Olij	Netherlands	GK	Sparta Rotterdam	
February	2023	Steven Berghuis	Netherlands	MF	Ajax	
March	2023	Xavi Simons	Netherlands	MF	PSV	
April	2023	Luuk de Jong	Netherlands	FW	PSV	
May	2023	Václav Černý	Czech Republic	FW	Twente	
August	2023	Vangelis Pavlidis	Greece	FW	AZ	
September	2023	Santiago Giménez	Mexico	FW	Feyenoord	
October	2023	Vangelis Pavlidis	Greece	FW	AZ	
November	2023	Joey Veerman	Netherlands	MF	PSV	
December	2023	Brian Brobbey	Netherlands	FW	Ajax	
January	2024	Brian Brobbey	Netherlands	FW	Ajax	
February	2024	Luuk de Jong	Netherlands	FW	PSV	
March	2024	Kaj Sierhuis	Netherlands	FW	Fortuna Sittard	
April	2024	Sam Lammers	Netherlands	FW	Utrecht	
May	2024	Tjaronn Chery	Suriname	MF	NEC	
August	2024	Joey Veerman	Netherlands	MF	PSV	
September	2024	Sem Steijn	Netherlands	MF	Twente	
October	2024	Thomas Didillon-Hödl	France	GK	Willem II	
November	2024	Dylan Mbayo	Belgium	FW	PEC Zwolle	
December	2024	Troy Parrott	Republic of Ireland	FW	AZ	
January	2025	Filip Krastev	Bulgaria	MF	PEC Zwolle	
February	2025	Brian Brobbey	Netherlands	FW	Ajax	
March	2025	Igor Paixão	Brazil	FW	Feyenoord	
April	2025	Miguel Rodríguez	Spain	FW	Utrecht	
May	2025	Ivan Perišić	Croatia	FW	PSV	
August	2025	Brynjólfur Willumsson	Iceland	FW	Groningen	
September	2025	Jordan Bos	Australia	DF	Feyenoord	
October	2025	Ayase Ueda	Japan	FW	Feyenoord	
November	2025	Guus Til	Netherlands	FW	PSV	
December	2025	Joey Veerman	Netherlands	MF	PSV	
January	2026	Joey Veerman	Netherlands	MF	PSV	
February	2026	Dennis Man	Romania	FW	PSV	
March	2026	Jakob Breum	Denmark	FW	Go Ahead Eagles	
April	2026	Kayne van Oevelen	Netherlands	GK	Volendam	
May	2026	Anis Hadj Moussa	Algeria	FW	Feyenoord	
August	2026	Gjivai Zechiël	Netherlands	MF	Feyenoord	
September	2026	Anis Hadj Moussa	Algeria	FW	Feyenoord	

== Multiple winners ==
As of September 2026 award

Rank	Player	Wins
1st	Joey Veerman	4
2nd	Steven Berghuis	3
2nd	Brian Brobbey	3
4th	Frenkie de Jong	2
4th	Luuk de Jong	2
4th	Cody Gakpo	2
4th	Anis Hadj Moussa	2
4th	Oussama Idrissi	2
4th	Davy Klaassen	2
4th	Orkun Kökçü	2
4th	Donyell Malen	2
4th	Vangelis Pavlidis	2
4th	Xavi Simons	2
4th	Guus Til	2
4th	Hakim Ziyech	2

== Awards won by nationality ==
As of September 2026 award

Nationality	Players	Wins
Netherlands	21	40
Morocco	2	4
Brazil	3	3
Greece	2	3
Algeria	1	2
Mexico	2	2
Norway	2	2
Sweden	2	2
Turkey	1	2
Australia	1	1
Belgium	1	1
Bulgaria	1	1
Croatia	1	1
Czech Republic	1	1
Denmark	1	1
France	1	1
Iceland	1	1
Israel	1	1
Japan	1	1
Republic of Ireland	1	1
Romania	1	1
Spain	1	1
Suriname	1	1
United States	1	1

== Awards won by position ==
As of September 2026 award

Position	Players	Wins
Forward	35	44
Midfielder	22	32
Defender	5	5
Goalkeeper	4	4

== Awards won by club ==
As of September 2026 award

Club	Players	Wins
PSV	14	22
Ajax	12	16
Feyenoord	11	14
AZ	6	8
Utrecht	5	5
PEC Zwolle	3	3
VVV-Venlo	3	3
Go Ahead Eagles	2	2
Heracles Almelo	2	2
Twente	2	2
Vitesse	2	2
Excelsior	1	1
Fortuna Sittard	1	1
Groningen	1	1
NEC	1	1
Sparta Rotterdam	1	1
Volendam	1	1
Willem II	1	1
