= Zakaria Labyad =

Moroccan footballer

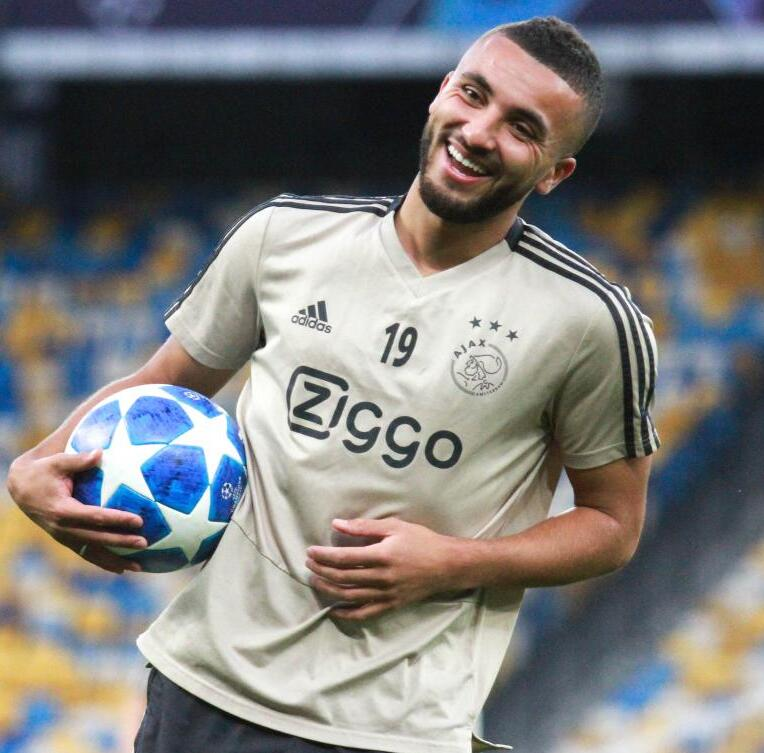
- Labyad with Ajax in 2018

Personal information
- Date of birth: 9 March 1993 (age 33)
- Place of birth: Utrecht, Netherlands
- Height: 1.75 m (5 ft 9 in)
- Positions: Attacking midfielder; forward

Team information
- Current team: Corinthians
- Number: 52

Youth career
- USV Elinkwijk
- 2004–2009: PSV

Senior career*
Years	Team	Apps	(Gls)
2010–2012	PSV	45	(8)
2012–2016	Sporting CP	19	(2)
2014–2015	→ Vitesse (loan)	45	(11)
2016	→ Fulham (loan)	2	(0)
2017–2018	FC Utrecht	43	(14)
2018–2022	Ajax	38	(7)
2023–2024	FC Utrecht	16	(1)
2024	Yunnan Yukun	30	(6)
2025	Dalian Yingbo	23	(5)
2026–	Corinthians	11	(1)

International career^{‡}
2009	Netherlands U17	3	(0)
2011–2012	Morocco U23	17	(7)
2012–2020	Morocco	6	(0)
- * Club domestic league appearances and goals as of 30 July 2026 ‡ National team caps and goals as of 18 June 2019

Zakaria Labyad (Arabic: زكريا لبيض; born 9 March 1993) is a professional footballer who plays as an attacking midfielder or forward for Corinthians in the Campeonato Brasileiro Série A. Born in the Netherlands, he represented that nation at under-17 level before switching his allegiance to Morocco and playing for them at under-23 level.

== Club career ==
=== PSV ===
Born in Utrecht, Labyad came through the youth program of PSV. In January 2009, he extended his contract with PSV until the summer of 2012. Before joining PSV, Labyad played for USV Elinkwijk. Labyad made his debut in the senior team on 25 February 2010 in a UEFA Europa League home match against Hamburger SV, coming on as a substitute for Otman Bakkal in the 71st minute. Three days later, Labyad also made his debut in the Eredivisie, coming on as a substitute for Balázs Dzsudzsák in a match against RKC Waalwijk. On 18 April 2010, Labyad made his first appearance in the starting line-up in a home match against FC Groningen. Labyad's selection in the starting line-up paid immediate dividends, with him scoring two goals in the 3–1 victory. In the last match of the 2009–10 season, Labyad was again in the starting lineup in a 1–1 draw against Alkmaar. Labyad more or less became a regular in the starting 11 in the 2011–12 season and experienced a great deal of success. He played in 32 matches and scored 6 goals. He scored a goal in the KNVB Beker semi final against Heerenveen and followingly won the cup with PSV.

=== Sporting CP ===
On 3 April 2012, Sporting CP's president revealed that Labyad will join the Portuguese team for the 2012–13 season, on a free transfer, signing a 5-year contract. However, on 23 May, PSV's technical director Marcel Brands told Dutch media that Labyad's contract was extended for another year since Labyad failed to formally terminate his contract before the legal deadline of 15 May.

On 2 July 2012, he officially joined Sporting. In his first season, he made 27 appearances for the club in which he scored three times.

==== Vitesse (loan) ====
In January 2014, after not playing a single match for Sporting during the first half of the season, Labyad was sent on loan to Dutch side Vitesse until the summer of 2015.

==== Return to Sporting CP ====
Labyad returned to Sporting CP for the 2015–16 Primeira Liga season to work with new Sporting CP manager Jorge Jesus who insisted upon Labyad's return as part of him agreeing to accept the Sporting CP job offer. Indeed, Labyad was viewed as a "pilar" for the new Sporting CP by Jorge Jesus.

==== Fulham (loan) ====
On 1 February 2016, Labyad moved on loan to Fulham until the end of the 2015–16 season. On 31 August 2016, Sporting CP announced that both parties had agreed to terminate the contract.

=== Utrecht ===
On 5 January 2017, Labyad signed for Eredivisie side FC Utrecht until 2019.

=== AFC Ajax ===
On 14 May 2018, Labyad signed for Eredivisie side AFC Ajax. He signed a four-season contract until June 2022.

=== Return to Utrecht ===
On 20 February 2023, Labyad signed a one-and-a-half-year contract with FC Utrecht, with an option to extend for an additional season.

=== Yunnan Yukun ===
On 1 March 2024, Labyad joined China League One club Yunnan Yukun.

=== Dalian Yingbo ===
On 10 January 2025, Labyad joined Chinese Super League club Dalian Yingbo.

=== Corinthians ===
On 20 February 2026, Labyad signed for Campeonato Brasileiro Série A club Corinthians.

== Personal life ==
Labyad has said that he looks up to former PSV team-mate Ibrahim Afellay, stating “Ibrahim is my friend. I have a lot of respect for him, not only because he plays in the same position as me, but also because as a person, he’s someone I look up to.” During his time at PSV, Labyad lived in Utrecht with his family, so he had to commute by train every day to Eindhoven. He followed an education in "Sport & Activity" at the ROC Eindhoven.

== Career statistics ==
=== Club ===
As of match played 30 July 2026

Appearances and goals by club, season and competition
Club	Season	League			Cup		Continental		Other		Total	
Club	Season	Division	Apps	Goals	Apps	Goals	Apps	Goals	Apps	Goals	Apps	Goals
PSV Eindhoven	2009–10	Eredivisie	6	2	—		1 (Note: Appearance(s) in UEFA Europa League)	0	—		7	2
PSV Eindhoven	2010–11	Eredivisie	7	0	3	0	2	1	—		12	1
PSV Eindhoven	2011–12	Eredivisie	32	6	6	4	10	2	—		48	12
PSV Eindhoven	Total		45	8	9	4	13	3	—		67	15
Sporting CP	2012–13	Primeira Liga	19	2	—		6	1	2 (Note: Appearance(s) in Taça da Liga)	0	27	3
Vitesse (loan)	2013–14	Eredivisie	16	3	—		—		2 (Note: Appearance(s) in European competition play-offs)	0	18	3
Vitesse (loan)	2014–15	Eredivisie	29	8	2	1	—		4	1	35	10
Vitesse (loan)	Total		45	11	2	1	—		6	1	53	13
Sporting CP B	2015–16	Segunda Liga	14	3	—		—		—		14	3
Fulham (loan)	2015–16	Championship	2	0	—		—		—		2	0
Jong FC Utrecht	2016–17	Eerste Divisie	2	0	—		—		—		2	0
Utrecht	2016–17	Eredivisie	14	3	1	0	—		4	0	19	3
Utrecht	2017–18	Eredivisie	29	11	1	1	6	2	3	3	39	17
Utrecht	Total		43	14	2	1	6	2	7	3	58	20
Ajax	2018–19	Eredivisie	12	1	5	3	3 (Note: Appearance(s) in UEFA Champions League)	0	—		20	4
Ajax	2019–20	Eredivisie	2	1	—		1	0	—		3	1
Ajax	2020–21	Eredivisie	20	5	2	3	5	0	—		27	8
Ajax	2021–22	Eredivisie	2	0	—		—		—		2	0
Ajax	Total		36	7	7	6	9	0	—		52	13
FC Utrecht	2022–23	Eredivisie	7	1	1	0	—		—		8	1
FC Utrecht	2023–24	Eredivisie	9	0	1	0	—		—		10	0
FC Utrecht	Total		16	1	2	0	—		—		18	1
Yunnan Yukun	2024	China League One	30	6	1	0	—		—		31	6
Dalian Yingbo	2025	Chinese Super League	23	5	1	0	—		—		24	5
Corinthians	2026	Série A	11	1	2	0	4 (Note: Appearance(s) in Copa Libertadores)	1	—		17	2
Career total			286	58	26	12	38	7	15	4	365	81

== Honours ==
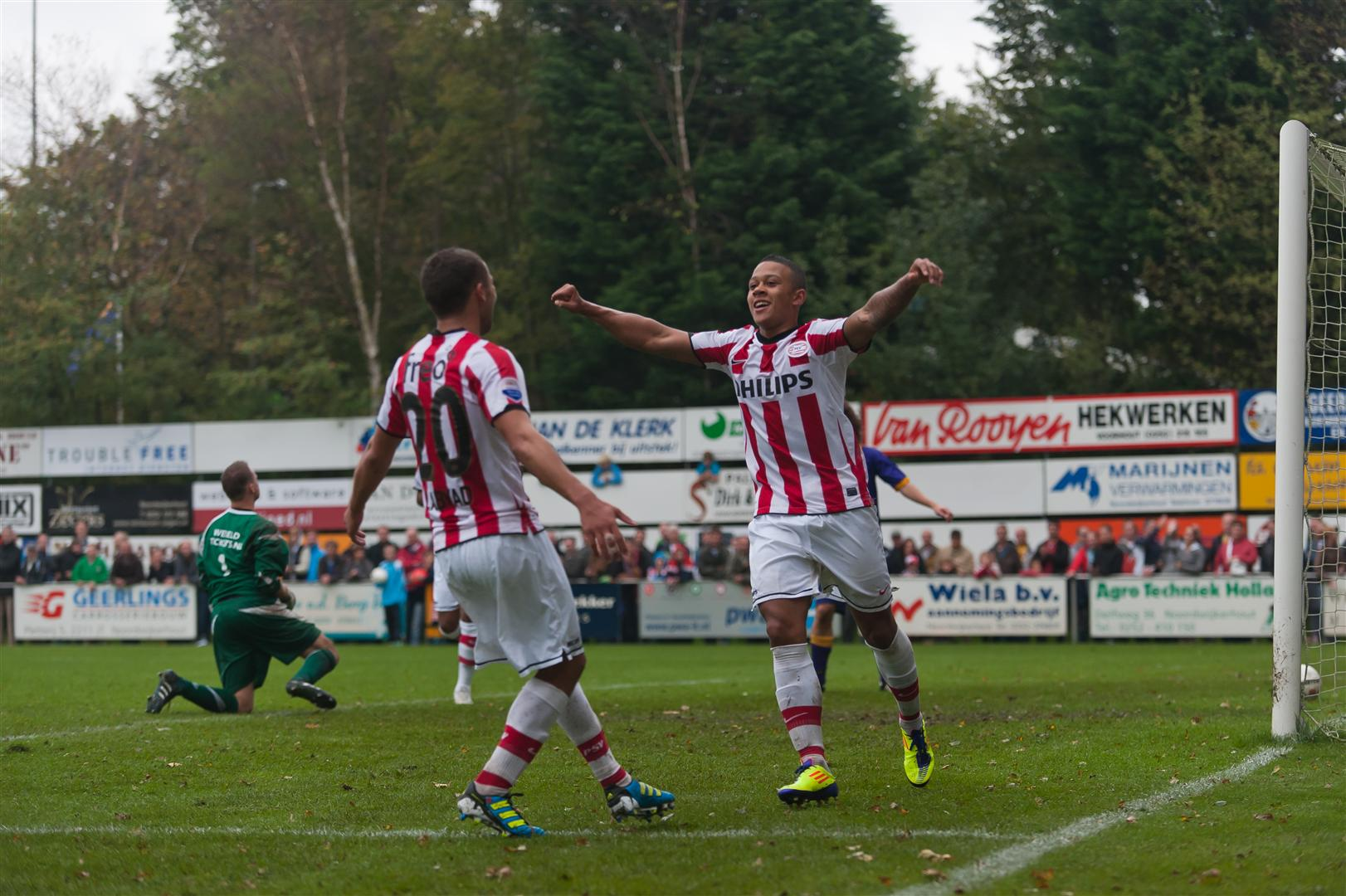
Labyad with Memphis Depay in 2011.

PSV

- KNVB Cup: 2011–12

Ajax

- Eredivisie: 2018–19, 2020–21, 2021–22
- KNVB Cup: 2018–19, 2020–21
- Johan Cruyff Shield: 2019

Yunnan Yukun

- China League One: 2024

Individual

- Eredivisie Player of the Month: November 2017
