= Moussa Sylla (footballer, born 1999) =

Malian footballer

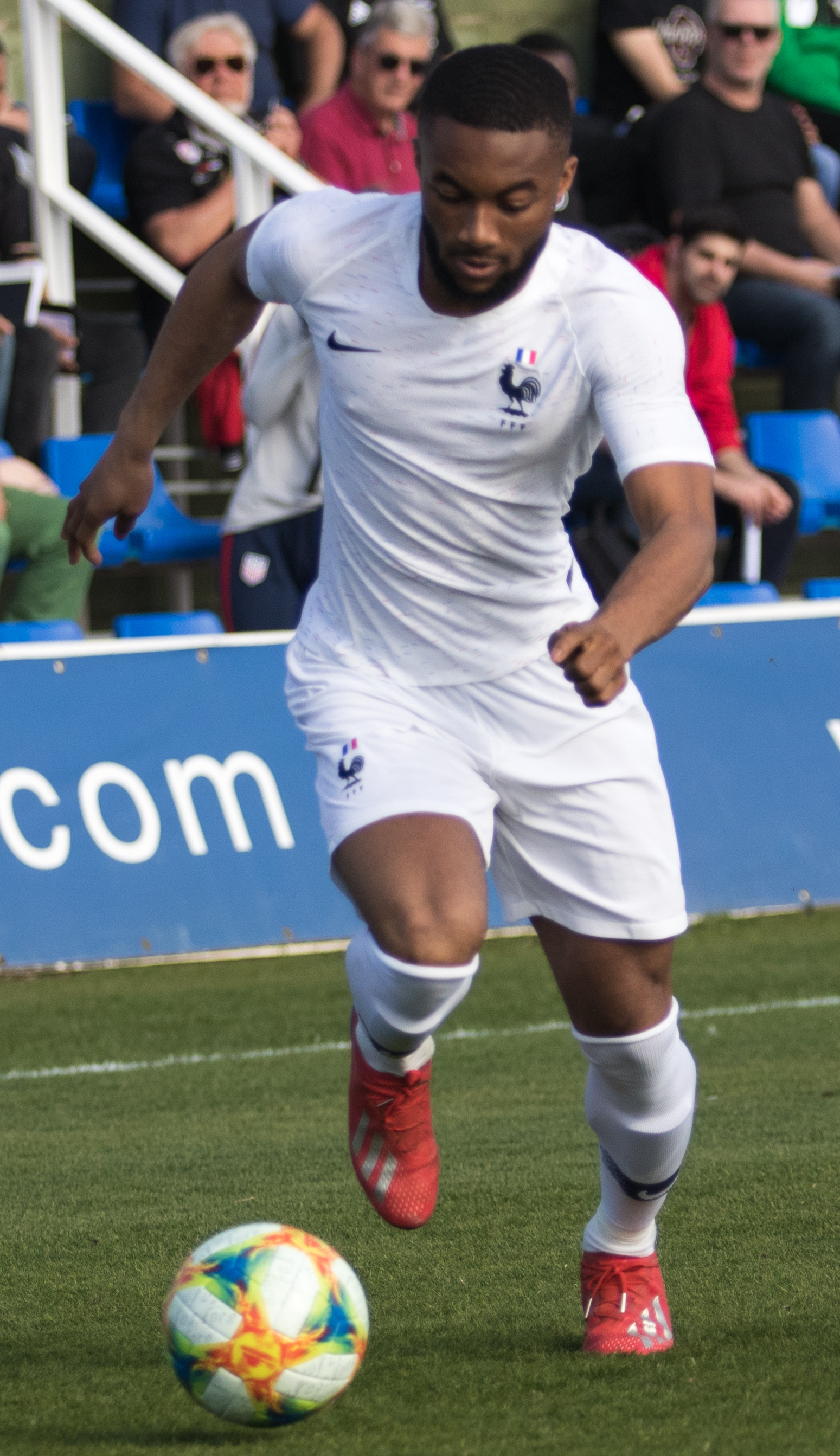
- Sylla playing for France U20 against US U20 in 2019

Personal information
- Full name: Moussa Sylla
- Date of birth: 25 November 1999 (age 26)
- Place of birth: Étampes, France
- Height: 1.81 m (5 ft 11 in)
- Positions: Forward; winger

Team information
- Current team: Schalke 04
- Number: 9

Youth career
- 2005–2012: Étampes FC
- 2012–2014: CS Brétigny
- 2014–2018: Monaco

Senior career*
Years	Team	Apps	(Gls)
2017–2020	Monaco II	45	(26)
2018–2020	Monaco	24	(2)
2020–2023	FC Utrecht	57	(7)
2020–2022	Jong FC Utrecht	7	(0)
2023–2024	Caen	13	(0)
2023–2024	→ Pau (loan)	35	(15)
2024	Pau	0	(0)
2024–	Schalke 04	58	(23)

International career^{‡}
2014	France U16	2	(0)
2016–2017	France U18	10	(0)
2017	France U19	5	(2)
2018–2019	France U20	5	(0)
2019	France B	1	(0)
2024–	Mali	6	(0)
- * Club domestic league appearances and goals as of 31 August 2026 ‡ National team caps and goals as of 12 October 2025

Moussa Sylla (born 25 November 1999) is a professional footballer who plays as a forward or winger for Bundesliga club Schalke 04. Born in France, he plays for the Mali national team.

== Club career ==
=== Monaco ===
On 10 February 2017, Sylla signed his first professional contract with Monaco keeping him at the club until June 2020. He made his professional debut for Monaco in a 3–1 Ligue 1 loss to Guingamp on 21 April 2018.

He scored his first professional goals on his first start on 6 May 2018, finding the back of the net both times in a 2–1 away victory against Caen in Ligue 1.

He was released from Monaco upon the expiration of his contract at the end of the 2019–20 Ligue 1 season.

=== FC Utrecht ===
On 15 September 2020, Sylla signed a three-year contract with Eredivisie side FC Utrecht, with an option to extend the contract until 2024. On 25 September 2021, he scores his second goal of the season against PEC Zwolle.

=== Caen ===
On 31 January 2023, Sylla joined Ligue 2 club Caen on a two-and-a-half-year contract.

=== Pau ===
On 8 August 2023, Sylla was loaned to Pau for the 2023–24 season. Pau activated an option to buy for €300,000 at the end of the season. However, Sylla was immediately transferred to Schalke 04 for a reported fee of €2,5 million.

=== Schalke 04 ===
On 24 June 2024, Sylla signed a four-year contract with German 2. Bundesliga club Schalke 04.

== International career ==
Born in France, Sylla is of Malian descent. A former youth international for France, he was called up to the Mali national team for a set of friendlies in March 2024. He made his debut on 22 March, coming on as a substitute in a 2–0 home win over Mauritania.

== Personal life ==
He is the brother of the Malian international Yacouba Sylla.

== Career statistics ==
=== Club ===
As of match played 30 August 2026

Appearances and goals by club, season and competition
Club	Season	League			National cup (Note: Includes Coupe de France, KNVB Cup, DFB-Pokal)		League cup (Note: Includes Coupe de la Ligue)		Europe		Total	
Club	Season	Division	Apps	Goals	Apps	Goals	Apps	Goals	Apps	Goals	Apps	Goals
Monaco II	2016–17	Championnat National	5	1	—		—		—		5	1
Monaco II	2017–18	Championnat National 2	19	14	—		—		—		19	14
Monaco II	2018–19	Championnat National 2	8	6	—		—		—		8	6
Monaco II	2019–20	Championnat National 2	13	5	—		—		—		13	5
Monaco II	Total		45	26	—		—		—		45	26
Monaco	2017–18	Ligue 1	5	2	0	0	0	0	0	0	5	2
Monaco	2018–19	Ligue 1	18	0	2	1	2	0	6 (Note: Appearances in UEFA Champions League)	1	28	2
Monaco	2019–20	Ligue 1	1	0	0	0	0	0	—		1	0
Monaco	Total		24	2	2	1	2	0	6	1	34	4
FC Utrecht	2020–21	Eredivisie	21	0	2	1	—		—		23	1
FC Utrecht	2021–22	Eredivisie	26	6	1	1	—		—		27	7
FC Utrecht	2022–23	Eredivisie	10	1	1	0	—		—		11	1
FC Utrecht	Total		57	7	4	2	—		—		61	9
Jong Utrecht	2021–22	Eerste Divisie	4	0	—		—		—		4	0
Jong Utrecht	2022–23	Eerste Divisie	3	0	—		—		—		3	0
Jong Utrecht	Total		7	0	—		—		—		7	0
Caen B	2022–23	Championnat National 2	2	1	—		—		—		2	1
Caen	2022–23	Ligue 2	13	0	0	0	—		—		13	0
Pau (loan)	2023–24	Ligue 2	35	15	2	1	—		—		37	16
Schalke 04	2024–25	2. Bundesliga	27	16	1	0	—		—		28	16
Schalke 04	2025–26	2. Bundesliga	30	7	2	0	—		—		32	7
Schalke 04	2026–27	Bundesliga	1	0	1	1	—		—		2	1
Schalke 04	Total		58	23	4	1	—		—		62	24
Career total			241	74	12	5	2	0	6	1	261	80

=== International ===
As of match played 12 October 2025

Appearances and goals by national team and year
National team	Year	Apps	Goals
Mali	2024	2	0
Mali	2025	4	0
Total		6	0

== Honours ==
Schalke 04

- 2. Bundesliga: 2025–26
