= Othmane Boussaid =

Belgian footballer

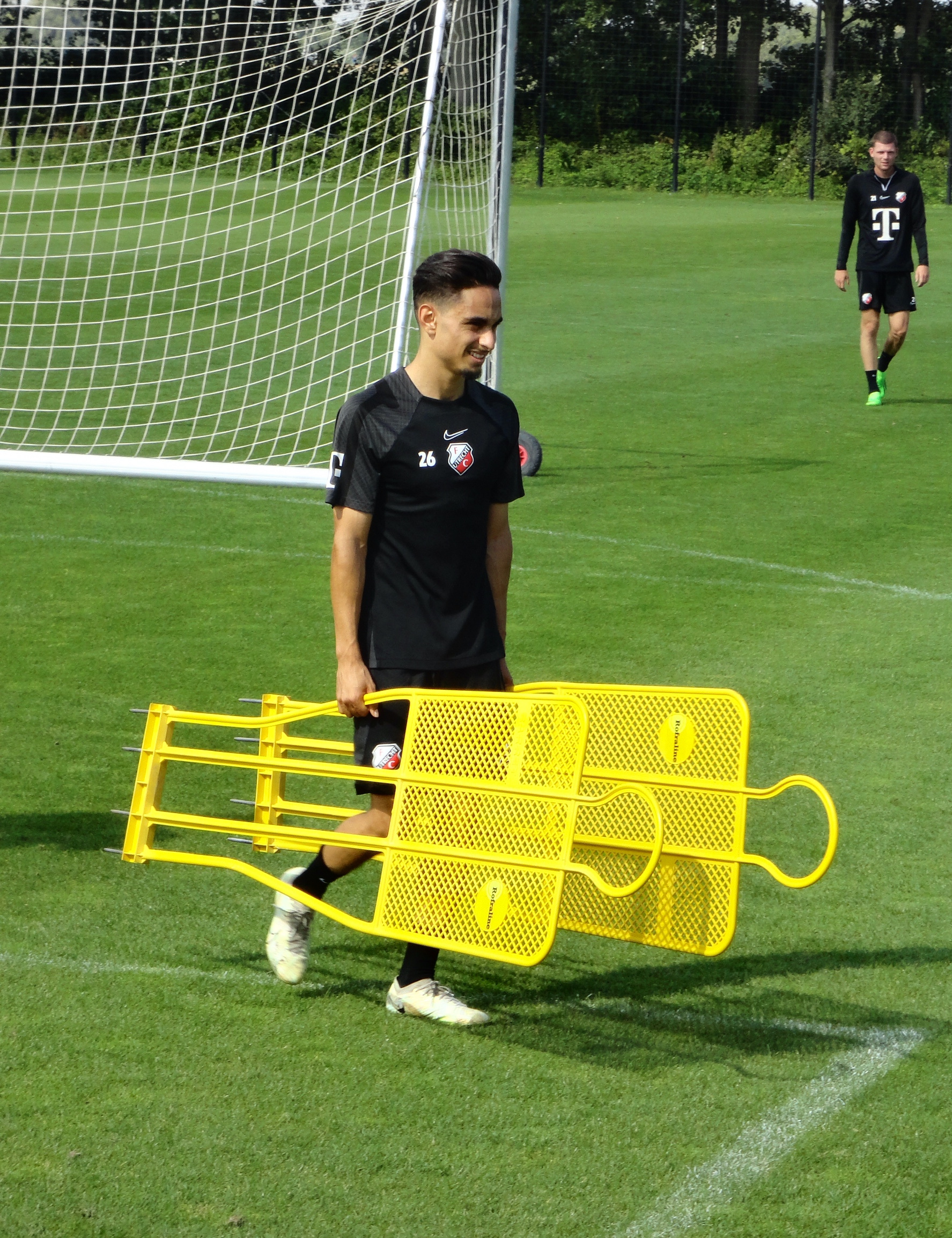
- Boussaid with Utrecht during training

Personal information
- Date of birth: 7 March 2000 (age 26)
- Place of birth: Kortrijk, Belgium
- Height: 1.70 m (5 ft 7 in)
- Position: Left winger

Team information
- Current team: Aris
- Number: 49

Youth career
- Lierse

Senior career*
Years	Team	Apps	(Gls)
2017–2018	Lierse	8	(1)
2018–2024	Utrecht	136	(10)
2018–2024	Jong Utrecht	13	(1)
2019–2020	→ NAC Breda (loan)	22	(0)
2024–2025	Al-Nasr	26	(2)
2026–	Aris	11	(0)

International career
2017	Belgium U17	8	(1)
2017–2018	Belgium U18	6	(0)
2018–2019	Belgium U19	7	(2)
2020–2022	Belgium U21	5	(0)
- * Club domestic league appearances and goals as of 5 September 2026

Othmane Boussaid (born 7 March 2000) is a Belgian professional footballer who plays as a left winger or an attacking midfielder for Greek Super League club Aris.

== Personal life ==
Born in Belgium, Boussaid is of Moroccan descent.
