= Luuk Brouwers =

Dutch footballer (born 1998)

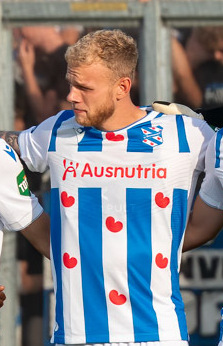
- Brouwers in 2023 with Heerenveen

Personal information
- Date of birth: 3 May 1998 (age 28)
- Place of birth: Helmond, Netherlands
- Height: 1.83 m (6 ft 0 in)
- Position: Midfielder

Team information
- Current team: Omonia
- Number: 20

Youth career
- 2007–2014: Den Bosch
- 2014–2015: Brabant United

Senior career*
Years	Team	Apps	(Gls)
2015–2020	Den Bosch	92	(8)
2020–2022	Go Ahead Eagles	66	(10)
2022–2024	Utrecht	24	(0)
2023–2024	→ Heerenveen (loan)	26	(6)
2024–2026	Heerenveen	56	(8)
2026–	Omonia	4	(2)
- * Club domestic league appearances and goals as of 10 October 2026

Luuk Brouwers (born 3 May 1998) is a Dutch professional footballer who plays as a midfielder for Cypriot First Division club Omonia.

== Club career ==
Brouwers made his professional debut in the Eerste Divisie for FC Den Bosch on 10 April 2015 in a game against Jong PSV.

On 5 February 2020, Brouwers signed a three-year contract effective from 30 June 2020 with Go Ahead Eagles.

On 23 March 2022, Brouwers agreed to join Utrecht on a five-year contract, beginning in July 2022.

On 21 August 2023, Brouwers moved to Heerenveen. The transfer is structured as an initial loan for the 2023–24 season, with a subsequent obligation to buy. Brouwers signed a contract with Heerenveen until June 2027.

On 2 September 2026, Brouwers signed with Omonia in Cyprus for two seasons, with an option for a third season.

== Honours ==
Individual

- Eredivisie Player of the Month: October 2021
- Eredivisie Team of the Month: October 2021, March 2022, October 2023,
