= 2023–24 FC Utrecht season =

FC Utrecht
2023–24 season
- Owner: Frans van Seumeren Holding B.V. (99%); Stichting Continuïteit FC Utrecht (1%) overige aandeelhouders (41%)
- Chairman: Steef Klop
- Head coach: Michael Silberbauer (until 29 August 2023); Rob Penders (a.i.) (29 Aug'23 - 11 Sept'23); Ron Jans (from 11 September 2023)
- Stadium: Stadion Galgenwaard
- Eredivisie: 7th
- KNVB Cup: Second round
- Play-offs: Final
- Top goalscorer: League: Sam Lammers (10); All: Sam Lammers (11)
- Highest home attendance: 22,676 (vs. Go Ahead Eagles, 14 April 2024)
- Lowest home attendance: 10,291 (vs. RKC Waalwijk, 31 October 2023)
- Average home league attendance: 20,099
- Biggest win: 5–1 (vs. PEC Zwolle, 3 April 2024)
- Biggest defeat: 1–5 (vs. Feyenoord, 3 September 2023)

The 2023–24 season was the 54th season in the existence of FC Utrecht and the club's 54th consecutive season in the top flight of Dutch football. In addition to the domestic league, FC Utrecht participated in this season's editions of the KNVB Cup. In the regular season, they qualified for the play-offs; for this they played for a place in the second round of the UEFA Conference League.

== Players ==
=== First-team squad ===
As of 4 April 2024

Note: Flags indicate national team as defined under FIFA eligibility rules; some limited exceptions apply. Players may hold more than one non-FIFA nationality.

No.	Pos.	Nation	Player
1	GK	GRE	Vasilis Barkas
2	DF	NED	Mark van der Maarel
3	DF	NED	Mike van der Hoorn
5	DF	NED	Hidde ter Avest
6	MF	GER	Can Bozdoğan
7	MF	DEN	Victor Jensen
8	MF	DEN	Oscar Fraulo (on loan from Borussia Mönchengladbach)
~~9~~	FW	GRE	~~Tasos Douvikas~~ (Note: Left during the season.)
9	FW	NED	Sam Lammers (on loan from Rangers FC)
10	FW	USA	Taylor Booth
11	FW	NED	Marouan Azarkan
14	MF	IRQ	Zidane Iqbal
15	FW	ENG	Adrian Blake
16	DF	MAR	Souffian El Karouani
~~17~~	DF	SUR	~~Sean Klaiber~~
17	DF	DEN	Jeppe Okkels
18	MF	NED	Jens Toornstra
19	FW	BEL	Anthony Descotte (on loan from RSC Charleroi)
~~20~~	FW	MAR	~~Zakaria Labyad~~
~~21~~	FW	NED	~~Mats Seuntjens~~
~~22~~	DF	ESP	~~Hugo Novoa~~ (~~on loan from RB Leipzig~~)
~~23~~	FW	NED	~~Bart Ramselaar~~
23	DF	DEN	Niklas Vesterlund

No.	Pos.	Nation	Player
24	DF	NED	Nick Viergever (captain)
26	FW	BEL	Othmane Boussaid
~~27~~	DF	FRA	~~Modibo Sagnan~~
29	DF	GER	Tim Handwerker (on loan from 1. FC Nürnberg)
31	GK	NED	Mattijs Branderhorst
~~32~~	GK	NED	~~Calvin Raatsie~~
32	GK	NED	Thijmen Nijhuis
~~33~~	DF	NED	~~Tommy St. Jago~~
33	DF	NED	Wessel Kooy
34	DF	NED	Ryan Flamingo (on loan from US Sassuolo)
35	DF	USA	Rickson van Hees
36	DF	NED	Yannick Leliendal
37	FW	SWE	Isac Lidberg
38	MF	IDN	Ivar Jenner
41	GK	NED	Devin Remie
44	DF	NED	Joshua Mukeh
45	DF	CUW	Nazjir Held
46	MF	DEN	Silas Andersen
47	MF	NED	Lynden Edhart
49	FW	NED	Jesse van de Haar
51	GK	DEN	Andreas Dithmer (on loan from FC Copenhagen)
61	GK	NED	Kevin Gadellaa
77	FW	NED	Ole Romeny

== Transfers ==
=== Summer ===
==== Transfers in ====
Nat.	Pos.	Player	Transferred from	Particularities	Ref.
(Netherlands) NED	FW	Marouan Azarkan	(Netherlands) Feyenoord	Purchased	
(Iraq) IRQ	MF	Zidane Iqbal	(England) Manchester United	Purchased	
(Sweden) SWE	FW	Isac Lidberg	(Netherlands) Go Ahead Eagles	Purchased	
(Germany) GER	MF	Can Bozdoğan	(Germany) FC Schalke 04	Buy option lifted	
(France) FRA	DF	Modibo Sagnan	(Spain) Real Sociedad	Buy option lifted	
(Netherlands) NED	DF	Ryan Flamingo	(Italy) US Sassuolo	On loan (+option to buy)	
(Denmark) DEN	MF	Oscar Fraulo	(Germany) Borussia Mönchengladbach	On loan (+option to buy)	
(Spain) ESP	DF	Hugo Novoa	(Germany) RB Leipzig	On loan	
(Greece) GRE	GK	Vasilis Barkas	(Scotland) Celtic	Transfer free	
(England) ENG	FW	Adrian Blake	(England) Watford FC	Transfer free	
(Netherlands) NED	GK	Mattijs Branderhorst	(Netherlands) N.E.C.	Transfer free	
(Morocco) MAR	DF	Souffian El Karouani	(Netherlands) N.E.C.	Transfer free	
(Netherlands) NED	FW	Ole Romeny	(Netherlands) FC Emmen	Transfer free	
(Netherlands) NED	FW	Mats Seuntjens	(Netherlands) RKC Waalwijk	Transfer free	
(Suriname) SUR	DF	Djevencio van der Kust	(United States) Houston Dynamo	Terminated the loan earlier	
(Netherlands) NED	FW	Remco Balk	(Netherlands) SC Cambuur	Back from loan	
(Morocco) MAR	FW	Mimoun Mahi	(Netherlands) SC Cambuur	Back from loan	

==== Transfers out ====
Nat.	Pos.	Player	Transferred to	Particularities	Ref.
(Netherlands) NED	FW	Remco Balk	(Netherlands) SC Cambuur	Sold	
(Greece) GRE	FW	Tasos Douvikas	(Spain) Celta de Vigo	Sold	
(Netherlands) NED	GK	Fabian de Keijzer	(Netherlands) Heracles Almelo	Sold	
(Suriname) SUR	DF	Sean Klaiber	(Denmark) Brøndby IF	Sold	
(Netherlands) NED	DF	Ruben Kluivert	(Netherlands) FC Dordrecht	Sold	
(Suriname) SUR	DF	Djevencio van der Kust	(Netherlands) Sparta Rotterdam	Sold	
(Estonia) EST	MF	Rocco Robert Shein	(Netherlands) FC Dordrecht	Sold	
(Netherlands) NED	DF	Tommy St. Jago	(Netherlands) Willem II	Sold	
(Netherlands) NED	FW	Bas Dost	(Netherlands) N.E.C.	Transfer free	
(Morocco) MAR	FW	Mimoun Mahi	(Netherlands) De Graafschap	Transfer free	
(Netherlands) NED	GK	Thijmen Nijhuis	Without club	Transfer free	
(Netherlands) NED	MF	Sander van de Streek	(Turkey) Antalyaspor	Transfer free	
(Netherlands) NED	DF	Django Warmerdam	(Netherlands) Sparta Rotterdam	Transfer free	
(Netherlands) NED	MF	Luuk Brouwers	(Netherlands) sc Heerenveen	On loan (+obligation to buy)	
(Greece) GRE	GK	Vasilis Barkas	(Scotland) Celtic	Back from loan	
(Germany) GER	MF	Can Bozdoğan	(Germany) FC Schalke 04	Back from loan (+option to buy)	
(Netherlands) NED	DF	Ramon Hendriks	(Netherlands) Feyenoord	Back from loan (+option to buy with repurchase option)	
(Japan) JPN	FW	Naoki Maeda	(Japan) Nagoya Grampus	Back from loan (+option to buy)	
(France) FRA	DF	Modibo Sagnan	(Spain) Real Sociedad	Back from loan (+option to buy, if lifted contract till 2026)	
(Germany) GER	FW	Amin Younes	(Saudi Arabia) Ettifaq FC	Back from loan	

=== Winter ===
==== Transfers in ====
Nat.	Pos.	Player	Transferred from	Particularities	Ref.
(Denmark) DEN	FW	Jeppe Okkels	(Sweden) IF Elfsborg	Purchased	
(Denmark) DEN	DF	Niklas Vesterlund	(Norway) Tromsø IL	Purchased	
(Netherlands) NED	GK	Thijmen Nijhuis	Without club	Transfer free	
(Germany) GER	DF	Tim Handwerker	(Germany) 1. FC Nürnberg	On loan (+option to buy)	
(Netherlands) NED	FW	Sam Lammers	(Scotland) Rangers FC	On loan	

==== Transfers out ====
Nat.	Pos.	Player	Transferred to	Particularities	Ref.
(Netherlands) NED	FW	Bart Ramselaar	(Singapore) Lion City Sailors FC	Sold	
(France) FRA	DF	Modibo Sagnan	(France) Montpellier HSC	Sold	
(Morocco) MAR	FW	Zakaria Labyad	(China) Yunnan Yukun FC	Transfer free	
(Netherlands) NED	FW	Mats Seuntjens	(Netherlands) RKC Waalwijk	Contract terminated	
(Spain) ESP	DF	Hugo Novoa	(Germany) RB Leipzig	Terminated the loan earlier	
(Netherlands) NED	GK	Calvin Raatsie	(Netherlands) Roda JC Kerkrade	On loan	

== Pre-season and friendlies ==
Win Draw Loss Fixtures

7 July 2023 Friendly	Regioteam Amersfoort (Netherlands)	0–6	(Netherlands) FC Utrecht	Amersfoort, Netherlands
19:30 CEST (UTC+2)		Report	St. Jago 4'; Seuntjens 14' (pen.), 30'; Brouwers 39'; Den Daas 56' (o.g.); Ramselaar 84'	Stadium: Sportpark Nimmerdor; Attendance: 1,200; Referee: Gerbert Stegeman

12 July 2023 Friendly	FC Utrecht (Netherlands)	0–2	(Belgium) KAA Gent	Alkmaar, Netherlands
17:30 CEST (UTC+2)		Report	Hjulsager 8'; Fofana 54'; Kums (yellow card)	Stadium: Sportpark Overdie; Attendance: 0 Referee: Thijs Dogterom
Note: Behind closed doors.

15 July 2023 Friendly	FC Utrecht (Netherlands)	1–2	(Belgium) Sporting Charleroi	Burgh-Haamstede, Netherlands
13:30 CEST (UTC+2)	Toornstra 29'	Report	Dabbagh 11'; Heymans 37'	Stadium: Sportpark van Zuijen; Attendance: 0 Referee: Luc Tissingh
Note: Behind closed doors.

22 July 2023 Friendly	FC Utrecht (Netherlands)	2–4	(Ukraine) Shakhtar Donetsk	Vlaardingen, Netherlands
14:00 CEST (UTC+2)	Klaiber 79'; Boussaid 82'	Report	Traoré 2'; Viunnyk 30'; Sudakov 58'; Rakitskyi 84'; Kryskiv (yellow card)	Stadium: Sportpark 't Nieuwelant; Attendance: 0 Referee: Nick Smit
Note: Behind closed doors and the encounter consisted of four half-hour halves.

28 July 2023 Friendly	FC Utrecht (Netherlands)	1–1	(Greece) A.E. Kifisia	Burgh-Haamstede, Netherlands
15:00 CEST (UTC+2)	Douvikas 5'	Report	Ožegović 36'; Capan (yellow card)	Stadium: Sportpark van Zuijen; Attendance: 125; Referee: Jazzy Hindriks

29 July 2023 Friendly	FC Utrecht (Netherlands)	2–0	(Greece) OFI	Utrecht, Netherlands
14:30 CEST (UTC+2)	Bozdoğan 59'; Booth 79'; St. Jago (yellow card)	Report	Karo (yellow card); Toral (yellow card)	Stadium: Sportcomplex Zoudenbalch; Attendance: 1,100; Referee: Allard Lindhout

2 August 2023 Friendly	FC Utrecht (Netherlands)	1–2	(Italy) Bologna FC	Utrecht, Netherlands
15:00 CEST (UTC+2)	Descotte 56'	Report	Zirkzee 76'; De Silvestri 80'; Schouten (yellow card); Corazza (yellow card); Moro (yellow card)	Stadium: Sportcomplex Zoudenbalch; Attendance: 1,100; Referee: Rob Dieperink

5 August 2023 Friendly	FC Utrecht (Netherlands)	3–0	(Spain) RCD Espanyol	Utrecht, Netherlands
17:00 CEST (UTC+2)	Douvikas 2', 34' (pen.); Labyad 66'; Seuntjens (yellow card)	Report	Óscar Gil (yellow card); Bare (yellow card); Calero (yellow card); Cabrera (yellow card)	Stadium: Stadion Galgenwaard; Attendance: 7,224; Referee: Joey Kooij

12 October 2023 Friendly	N.E.C. (Netherlands)	1–2	(Netherlands) FC Utrecht	Nijmegen, Netherlands
13:00 CEST (UTC+2)	Dost 33'	Report	Descotte 10'; Bozdoğan 42'	Stadium: Goffertstadion; Attendance: 0 Referee: Eric van der Vaart
Note: Behind closed doors.

16 November 2023 Friendly	FC Utrecht (Netherlands)	3–1	(Netherlands) PEC Zwolle	Utrecht, Netherlands
13:00 CET (UTC+1)	Jensen 42', 72', 86'	Report	Thy 30'; Fichtinger (yellow card)	Stadium: Sportcomplex Zoudenbalch; Attendance: 0 Referee: Niels Boel
Note: Behind closed doors.

7 January 2024 Friendly	FC Utrecht (Netherlands)	4–4	(Belgium) SK Beveren	Campoamor, Spain
14:30 CET (UTC+1)	Romeny 25'; Bozdoğan 33'; El Karouani 59'; Andersen 97'	Report	Ismaheel 23'; Koyalipou 39', 57'; Ertürk 62'; Everton Luiz (yellow card)	Stadium: Real Club de Golf Campoamor Resort; Attendance: Unknown; Referee: Carlos Guitérrrez Baeza
Note: The match lasted 105 minutes in total.

12 February 2024 Friendly	FC Utrecht (Netherlands)	1–2	(Netherlands) FC Groningen	Utrecht, Netherlands
13:00 CET (UTC+1)	Labyad 68'	Report	Mendes 35'; Bouland 58'	Stadium: Sportcomplex Zoudenbalch; Attendance: 0 Referee: Unknown
Note: Behind closed doors.

21 March 2024 Friendly	FC Utrecht (Netherlands)	3–0	(Netherlands) Helmond Sport	Utrecht, Netherlands
13:00 CET (UTC+1)	Blake 35'; Azarkan 38'; Lidberg 60'	Report		Stadium: Sportcomplex Zoudenbalch; Attendance: 275; Referee: Nurettin Eren

18 April 2024 Friendly	FC Utrecht (Netherlands)	0–0	(Netherlands) Heracles Almelo	Utrecht, Netherlands
13:00 CEST (UTC+2)	Flamingo (yellow card)	Report	Vejinović (yellow card); Bruns (yellow card)	Stadium: FC Utrecht Topsportcentrum; Attendance: 0 Referee: Nurettin Eren
Note: Behind closed doors.

== Competitions ==
=== Overall record ===
Competition	First match	Last match	Starting round	Final position	Record							
Competition	First match	Last match	Starting round	Final position	Pld	W	D	L	GF	GA	GD	Win %
Eredivisie	12 August 2023	19 May 2024	Matchday 1	7th	34	13	11	10	49	47	+2	38.24
KNVB Cup	31 October 2023	20 December 2023	First round	Second round	2	1	0	1	4	4	+0	50.00
Play-offs	23 May 2024	26 May 2024	Semi-final	Final	2	1	0	1	4	3	+1	50.00
Total					38	15	11	12	57	54	+3	39.47

Last updated: 27 May 2024
Source: Soccerway

=== Eredivisie ===
==== League table ====
Pos	Team	Pld	W	D	L	GF	GA	GD	Pts	Qualification or relegation
5	Ajax	34	15	11	8	74	61	+13	56	Qualification for the Europa League second qualifying round
6	NEC	34	14	11	9	68	51	+17	53	Qualification for the European competition play-offs
7	Utrecht	34	13	11	10	49	47	+2	50	Qualification for the European competition play-offs
8	Sparta Rotterdam	34	14	7	13	51	48	+3	49	Qualification for the European competition play-offs
9	Go Ahead Eagles (O)	34	12	10	12	47	46	+1	46	Qualification for the European competition play-offs

Source: Eredivisie
Rules for classification: Season in progress: 1) Most points won; 2) Less points lost; 3) Goal difference; 4) Goals scored; 5) Alphabetical order; End of season: 1) Points; 2) Goal difference; 3) Goals scored; 4) Head-to-head points; 5) Head-to-head goal difference; 6) Head-to-head away goals scored; 7) Play-off if relevant for deciding champion, relegation or participating in a European league, otherwise by draw. 8) Penalty shoot-out (only after a play-off)
(O) Play-off winners

==== Results summary ====
Overall								Home						Away					
Pld	W	D	L	GF	GA	GD	Pts	W	D	L	GF	GA	GD	W	D	L	GF	GA	GD
34	13	11	10	49	47	+2	50	8	5	4	29	23	+6	5	6	6	20	24	−4

Last updated: 20 May 2024.
Source: Eredivisie

==== Results by round ====
Round	1	2	3	4	5	6	7	8	9	10	11	12	13	14	15	16	17	18	19	20	21	22	23	24	25	26	27	28	29	30	31	32	33	34
Ground	A	H	A	H	A	A	H	A	H	A	H	H	A	H	A	H	A	H	A	H	H	A	H	A	A	H	A	H	A	H	A	H	H	A
Result	L	L	L	L	W	L	L	L	W	D	D	D	W	D	W	D	D	D	D	W	W	W	W	L	D	W	L	W	W	W	D	W	L	D
Position	15	18	15	16	15	16	17	18	17	18	17	16	16	14	13	13	13	14	13	11	9	9	8	8	8	8	8	8	8	7	7	7	7	7

Updated to match(es) played on 20 May 2024. Source: Eredivisie
A = Away; H = Home; W = Win; D = Draw; L = Loss

==== Matches ====
The league fixtures were announced on 30 June 2023.

12 August 2023 1	PSV	2–0	FC Utrecht	Eindhoven
16:30 CEST (UTC+2)	Lang 45+3'; Ramalho (yellow card) 48'; Teze (yellow card) 55'; Vertessen 77'	Report	Van der Hoorn (yellow card) 47'	Stadium: Philips Stadion; Attendance: 32,486; Referee: Serdar Gözübüyük

20 August 2023 2	FC Utrecht	0–2	sc Heerenveen	Utrecht
12:15 CEST (UTC+2)		Report	Van Ottele (yellow card) 45+2'; Sahraoui 69'; Karlsbakk 90+2'	Stadium: Stadion Galgenwaard; Attendance: 19,878; Referee: Ingmar Oostrom

27 August 2023 3	PEC Zwolle	1–0	FC Utrecht	Zwolle
12:15 CEST (UTC+2)	Lam (yellow card) 39'; Druijf 69' (pen.); Van den Berg (yellow card) 76'	Report	Azarkan (yellow card) 34'; Seuntjens (yellow card) 48'; Viergever (yellow card) 84'	Stadium: MAC³PARK stadion Attendance: 14,000; Referee: Laurens Gerrets

3 September 2023 4	FC Utrecht	1–5	Feyenoord	Utrecht
12:15 CEST (UTC+2)	Flamingo 19'; Toornstra (yellow card) 57'	Report	Giménez 8', 46'; Stengs 28'; Ueda 71'; Minteh 90+3'	Stadium: Stadion Galgenwaard; Attendance: 20,366; Referee: Pol van Boekel

16 September 2023 5	Heracles Almelo	1–3	FC Utrecht	Almelo
21:00 CEST (UTC+2)	Limbombe (yellow card) 25'; Willems (yellow card) 60'; Nankishi 62'; Vejinović (yellow card) 73'	Report	Romeny 5'; Bozdoğan (yellow card) 34'; Jensen 45+6'; Fraulo (yellow card) 58'; Barkas (yellow card) 89'; Bakboord 90+4' (o.g.)	Stadium: Erve Asito; Attendance: 11,831; Referee: Sander van der Eijk

23 September 2023 6	N.E.C.	3–0	FC Utrecht	Nijmegen
18:45 CEST (UTC+2)	Verdonk (yellow card) 17'; Proper 31'; Mattsson 34'; Dost 52' (pen.)	Report	Jensen (yellow card) 44'; Van der Maarel (yellow card) 58'	Stadium: Goffertstadion; Attendance: 12,500; Referee: Dennis Higler

30 September 2023 7	FC Utrecht	0–2	Almere City FC	Utrecht
18:45 CEST (UTC+2)	Flamingo (yellow card) 38'; Novoa (yellow card) 60' (yellow-red card) 63'; Fraulo (yellow card) 89'	Report	Van Bruggen (yellow card) 22'; Mbe Soh (yellow card) 26'; Kitala (yellow card) 45+3'; Robinet 80'; Van La Parra 89'; Koopmeiners (yellow card) 90+1'	Stadium: Stadion Galgenwaard; Attendance: 22,177; Referee: Edwin van de Graaf

6 October 2023 8	FC Volendam	1–0	FC Utrecht	Volendam
20:00 CEST (UTC+2)	Twigt (yellow card) 35'; Mühren 57'; Douiri (yellow card) 83'; Ould-Chikh (yellow card) 90+4'	Report	Viergever (red card) 5'; Lidberg (yellow card) 20'; Fraulo (yellow card) 20'	Stadium: Kras Stadion; Attendance: 6,525; Referee: Serdar Gözübüyük

22 October 2023 9	FC Utrecht	4–3	Ajax	Utrecht
12:15 CEST (UTC+2)	Flamingo 44'; Van der Hoorn 48'; Toornstra 71'; Fraulo 90'; Seuntjens (yellow card) 90+4'	Report	Hlynsson 52', 55'; Bergwijn 65' (pen.); Sosa (yellow card) 75'; Tahirović (yellow card) 83'	Stadium: Stadion Galgenwaard; Attendance: 22,198; Referee: Dennis Higler

28 October 2023 10	Fortuna Sittard	0–0	FC Utrecht	Sittard
21:00 CEST (UTC+2)	Halilović (penalty missed) 51'; Belkheir (yellow card) 70'	Report	Descotte (yellow card) 77'	Stadium: Fortuna Sittard Stadion; Attendance: 10,102; Referee: Bas Nijhuis

5 November 2023 11	FC Utrecht	1–1	FC Twente	Utrecht
12:15 CET (UTC+1)	Fraulo 23'; Flamingo (yellow card) 30'; Van der Hoorn (yellow card) 35'; Azarkan (yellow card) 41'	Report	Steijn 31' (pen.); Ugalde (yellow card) 45+3'; Sadílek (yellow card) 45+6' (yellow-red card) 66'; Hilgers (yellow card) 90+3'	Stadium: Stadion Galgenwaard; Attendance: 17,491; Referee: Serdar Gözübüyük

12 November 2023 12	FC Utrecht	2–2	Excelsior	Utrecht
20:00 CET (UTC+1)	Bozdoğan 70'; Sagnan 90+3', (yellow card) 90+4'	Report	Driouech 53'; Lamprou 62'; Baas (yellow card) 83'	Stadium: Stadion Galgenwaard; Attendance: 20,235; Referee: Marc Nagtegaal

26 November 2023 13	Sparta Rotterdam	1–2	FC Utrecht	Rotterdam
16:45 CET (UTC+1)	Neghli 43'	Report	Seuntjens 5'; Leliendal (yellow card) 40'; Lidberg 54'; Barkas (yellow card) 71'; Boussaid (yellow card) 76'	Stadium: Het Kasteel; Attendance: 10,030; Referee: Joey Kooij

3 December 2023 14	FC Utrecht	1–1	AZ	Utrecht
16:45 CET (UTC+1)	Jensen 49'	Report	Pavlidis 40'; Møller Wolfe (yellow card) 56'	Stadium: Stadion Galgenwaard; Attendance: 18,267; Referee: Erwin Blank

10 December 2023 15	Go Ahead Eagles	0–2	FC Utrecht	Deventer
12:15 CET (UTC+1)		Report	Jensen 10'; Ramselaar 28'	Stadium: De Adelaarshorst; Attendance: 9,873; Referee: Allard Lindhout

16 December 2023 16	FC Utrecht	1–1	RKC Waalwijk	Utrecht
16:30 CET (UTC+1)	Jensen 28'	Report	Kramer 45' (pen.); Oukili (yellow card) 58'; Adewoye (yellow card) 63'; Felida (yellow card) 90+1'; Lokesa (yellow card) 90+5'	Stadium: Stadion Galgenwaard; Attendance: 22,033; Referee: Serdar Gözübüyük

14 January 2024 17	Vitesse	0–0	FC Utrecht	Arnhem
14:30 CET (UTC+1)	Kozłowski (yellow card) 43'	Report	El Karouani (yellow card) 59'	Stadium: GelreDome; Attendance: 14,207; Referee: Richard Martens

21 January 2024 18	FC Utrecht	1–1	PSV	Utrecht
12:15 CET (UTC+1)	Toornstra (yellow card) 27'; Boussaid 53'; Fraulo (yellow card) 89'	Report	Bakayoko 7'; De Jong (yellow card) 54'	Stadium: Stadion Galgenwaard; Attendance: 21,727; Referee: Joey Kooij

27 January 2024 19	Excelsior	1–1	FC Utrecht	Rotterdam
21:00 CET (UTC+1)	Horemans 65'	Report	Toornstra 63'	Stadium: Van Donge & De Roo Stadion; Attendance: 4,400; Referee: Pol van Boekel

4 February 2024 20	FC Utrecht	4–2	FC Volendam	Utrecht
14:30 CET (UTC+1)	Boussaid (yellow card) 35'; Van der Hoorn (yellow card) 38'; Booth 38', 57', 84'; Viergever 45'	Report	Booth 9'; Flint (yellow card) 50', (goal) 54'	Stadium: Stadion Galgenwaard; Attendance: 20,161; Referee: Allard Lindhout

11 February 2024 21	FC Utrecht	4–0	Fortuna Sittard	Utrecht
14:30 CET (UTC+1)	Booth 21', 75'; Boussaid 70'; Lammers 78'	Report		Stadium: Stadion Galgenwaard; Attendance: 18,463; Referee: Serdar Gözübüyük

18 February 2024 22	FC Twente	0–1	FC Utrecht	Enschede
12:15 CET (UTC+1)		Report	Toornstra 29'; El Karouani (yellow card) 90+3'	Stadium: De Grolsch Veste; Attendance: 29,800; Referee: Marc Nagtegaal

23 February 2024 23	FC Utrecht	1–0	Heracles Almelo	Utrecht
20:00 CET (UTC+1)	Toornstra (yellow card) 41'; El Karouani (yellow card) 74'; Jensen 79'; Van der Hoorn (yellow card) 87'	Report	Sonnenberg (yellow card) 89'; Vejinović (yellow card) 90+1'	Stadium: Stadion Galgenwaard; Attendance: 20,012; Referee: Jochem Kamphuis

3 March 2024 24	Ajax	2–0	FC Utrecht	Amsterdam
12:15 CET (UTC+1)	Brobbey 39'; Mannsverk (yellow card) 65'; Taylor 77'; Rensch (red card) 83'	Report	Azarkan (yellow card) 36'; Flamingo (yellow card) 42'	Stadium: Johan Cruijff ArenA; Attendance: 53,159; Referee: Sander van der Eijk

9 March 2024 25	Almere City FC	1–1	FC Utrecht	Almere
20:00 CET (UTC+1)	Cathline 3'; Jacobs (yellow card) 39'	Report	Lammers 14'; Ter Avest (yellow card) 44'; Flamingo (yellow card) 74'	Stadium: Yanmar Stadion; Attendance: 4,222; Referee: Jannick van der Laan

17 March 2024 26	FC Utrecht	1–0	N.E.C.	Utrecht
14:30 CET (UTC+1)	Bozdoğan (yellow card) 42'; Lammers 61'; Van der Hoorn (yellow card) 90+2'	Report	Nuytinck (yellow card) 19'	Stadium: Stadion Galgenwaard; Attendance: 21,147; Referee: Danny Makkelie

31 March 2024 27	Feyenoord	4–2	FC Utrecht	Rotterdam
14:30 CEST (UTC+2)	Hartman (yellow card) 30'; Paixão 36'; Nieuwkoop (yellow card) 49'; Fraulo 65' (o.g.); Hancko 71'; Geertruida (yellow card) 73'; Sauer 85'	Report	Boussaid 2'; Lammers 32' (pen.); Bozdoğan (yellow card) 51'; Vesterlund (yellow card) 59'	Stadium: Allard Lindhout; Attendance: 47,500; Referee: De Kuip

3 April 2024 28	FC Utrecht	5–1	PEC Zwolle	Utrecht
20:00 CEST (UTC+2)	Lammers 47'; Toornstra 49'; Lidberg 77', 79'; Blake 87'	Report	Van den Berg (yellow card) 32'; Thy 60'	Stadium: Stadion Galgenwaard; Referee: Serdar Gözübüyük

7 April 2024 29	sc Heerenveen	2–3	FC Utrecht	Heerenveen
20:00 CEST (UTC+2))	Braude (yellow card) 70' (yellow-red card) 77'; Wålemark 90', 90+4'	Report	Lidberg 37'; Jensen (yellow card) 39'; Lammers 48', 83'	Stadium: Abe Lenstra Stadion; Attendance: 20,417; Referee: Jeroen Manschot

14 April 2024 30	FC Utrecht	2–1	Go Ahead Eagles	Utrecht
14:30 CEST (UTC+2)	Lammers 4'; Van der Maarel (yellow card) 55'; Bozdoğan 90+3'	Report	Nauber 42'	Stadium: Stadion Galgenwaard; Attendance: 22,676; Referee: Sander van der Eijk

28 April 2024 31	RKC Waalwijk	2–2	FC Utrecht	Waalwijk
14:30 CEST (UTC+2)	Min 26', (yellow card) 65'; Margaret 66'	Report	El Karouani (yellow card) 59'; Bozdoğan 61', (yellow card) 69'; Lammers 84'	Stadium: Mandemakers Stadion; Attendance: 6,734; Referee: Dennis Higler

5 May 2024 32	FC Utrecht	1–0	Vitesse	Utrecht
14:30 CEST (UTC+2)	Jensen 48'	Report	Boutrah (yellow card) 45+2'; Tielemans (yellow card) 58'; Hadj-Moussa (yellow card) 78'	Stadium: Stadion Galgenwaard; Attendance: 20,314; Referee: Rob Dieperink

12 May 2024 33	FC Utrecht	0–1	Sparta Rotterdam	Utrecht
14:30 CEST (UTC+2)	Ter Avest (yellow card) 23'	Report	Neghli 68'	Stadium: Stadion Galgenwaard; Attendance: 22,270; Referee: Jannick van der Laan

19 May 2024 34	AZ	2–2	FC Utrecht	Alkmaar
14:30 CEST (UTC+2)	M. de Wit 15'; Van Bommel 16'; Pavlidis 37', (yellow card) 38'; Sadiq (yellow card) 51'; D. de Wit (red card) 60'	Report	Boussaid 55'; Lammers 71'; Jensen 81'	Stadium: AFAS Stadion; Attendance: 18,937; Referee: Bas Nijhuis

=== KNVB Cup ===
31 October 2023 First round	FC Utrecht	3–2	RKC Waalwijk	Utrecht
21:00 CET (UTC+1)	Fraulo 7'; Van der Hoorn 17'; Lidberg 30' (pen.), (yellow card) 71'; Leliendal (yellow card) 47'; Toornstra (yellow card) 90+2'	Report	Kramer (yellow card) 21'; Lokesa 44', 51'; Oukili (yellow card) 53'; Gaari (yellow card) 69'; Bruma (yellow card) 71'	Stadium: Stadion Galgenwaard; Attendance: 10,291; Referee: Laurens Gerrets

20 December 2023 Second round	Feyenoord	2–1	FC Utrecht	Rotterdam
21:00 CET (UTC+1)	Stengs 7'; Paixão 26'	Report	Booth 41'	Stadium: De Kuip; Attendance: 47,500; Referee: Pol van Boekel

=== Play-offs ===
23 May 2024 Semi-final	FC Utrecht	3–1	Sparta Rotterdam	Utrecht
21:00 CEST (UTC+2)	Flamingo 41'; Lammers 70'; Jensen 90+3', (yellow card) 90+3'	Report	Clement (yellow card) 35'; Lauritsen 38'; Metinho (yellow card) 90+5'	Stadium: Stadion Galgenwaard; Attendance: 20,092; Referee: Danny Makkelie

26 May 2024 Final	FC Utrecht	1–2 (a.e.t.)	Go Ahead Eagles	Utrecht
18:00 CEST (UTC+2)	Booth (yellow card) 20'; Viergever 31', (yellow card) 44'; Fraulo (red card) 86'; El Karouani (yellow card) 117'	Report	Edvarsen (yellow card) 37'; De Lange (yellow card) 87'; Viergever 90+1' (o.g.); Kramer (yellow card) 90+4', (goal) 117'; Baeten (yellow card) 114'; Stokkers (yellow card) 120+6'	Stadium: Stadion Galgenwaard; Attendance: 22,574; Referee: Allard Lindhout

== Statistics ==
=== Goalscorers ===
Friendlies

No.	Name	Goal
1.	(Germany) Can Bozdoğan	3
1.	(Greece) Tasos Douvikas	3
1.	(Denmark) Victor Jensen	3
4.	(Belgium) Anthony Descotte	2
4.	(Morocco) Zakaria Labyad	2
4.	(Netherlands) Mats Seuntjens	2
7.	(Denmark) Silas Andersen	1
7.	(Netherlands) Marouan Azarkan	1
7.	(England) Adrian Blake	1
7.	(United States) Taylor Booth	1
7.	(Belgium) Othmane Boussaid	1
7.	(Netherlands) Luuk Brouwers	1
7.	(Netherlands) Tommy St. Jago	1
7.	(Morocco) Souffian El Karouani	1
7.	(Suriname) Sean Klaiber	1
7.	(Sweden) Isac Lidberg	1
7.	(Netherlands) Bart Ramselaar	1
7.	(Netherlands) Ole Romeny	1
7.	(Netherlands) Jens Toornstra	1
Own goals opponent		1
Totals		29

(Netherlands) Eredivisie

No.	Name	Goal
1.	(Netherlands) Sam Lammers	10
2.	(Denmark) Victor Jensen	7
3.	(United States) Taylor Booth	5
4.	(Belgium) Othmane Boussaid	4
4.	(Sweden) Isac Lidberg	4
4.	(Netherlands) Jens Toornstra	4
7.	(Germany) Can Bozdoğan	3
8.	(Netherlands) Ryan Flamingo	2
8.	(Denmark) Oscar Fraulo	2
10.	(England) Adrian Blake	1
10.	(Netherlands) Mike van der Hoorn	1
10.	(Netherlands) Bart Ramselaar	1
10.	(Netherlands) Ole Romeny	1
10.	(France) Modibo Sagnan	1
10.	(Netherlands) Mats Seuntjens	1
10.	(Netherlands) Nick Viergever	1
Own goals opponent		1
Totals		49

(Netherlands) KNVB Cup

No.	Name	Goal
1.	(United States) Taylor Booth	1
1.	(Denmark) Oscar Fraulo	1
1.	(Netherlands) Mike van der Hoorn	1
1.	(Sweden) Isac Lidberg	1
Own goals opponent		-
Totals		4

(Netherlands) Play-offs

No.	Name	Goal
1.	(Netherlands) Ryan Flamingo	1
1.	(Denmark) Victor Jensen	1
1.	(Netherlands) Sam Lammers	1
1.	(Netherlands) Nick Viergever	1
Own goals opponent		–
Totals		4

=== Assists ===
(Netherlands) Eredivisie

No.	Name	
1.	(Netherlands) Jens Toornstra	5
2.	(Denmark) Oscar Fraulo	4
3.	(Belgium) Othmane Boussaid	3
3.	(Morocco) Souffian El Karouani	3
3.	(Denmark) Victor Jensen	3
3.	(Netherlands) Sam Lammers	3
3.	(Sweden) Isac Lidberg	3
8.	(Netherlands) Hidde ter Avest	1
8.	(Netherlands) Marouan Azarkan	1
8.	(England) Adrian Blake	1
8.	(Germany) Can Bozdoğan	1
8.	(Netherlands) Ryan Flamingo	1
8.	(Morocco) Zakaria Labyad	1
8.	(Denmark) Jeppe Okkels	1
8.	(Netherlands) Bart Ramselaar	1
8.	(Netherlands) Mats Seuntjens	1
Totals		33

(Netherlands) KNVB Cup

No.	Name	
1.	(Netherlands) Jens Toornstra	2
2.	(Morocco) Souffian El Karouani	1
Totals		3

(Netherlands) Play-offs

No.	Name	
1.	(Netherlands) Hidde ter Avest	1
Totals		1

== Monthly awards ==
Month	Type of award	Player	Ref.
December	Team of the Month	(Greece) Vasilis Barkas	1
December	VI Player of the Month	(Greece) Vasilis Barkas	2
January	Team of the Month	(Belgium) Othmane Boussaid	3
April	Player of the Month	(Netherlands) Sam Lammers	4; 5
April	Team of the Month	(Netherlands) Sam Lammers	6

== Attendance ==
=== Home games ===
Round	Opponent	Attendance	Total attendance	Average
Friendlies
N/A	(Belgium) KAA Gent	0 (Note: Behind closed doors.) (Note: Match played at VV Alkmaarsche Boys.)	0	0
N/A	(Belgium) Sporting Charleroi	0 (Note: Match played at FC De Westhoek.)	0	0
N/A	(Ukraine) Shakhtar Donetsk	0 (Note: Match played at SV CWO.)	0	0
N/A	(Greece) AE Kifisia	125	125	125
N/A	(Greece) OFI Crete	1,100 (Note: Match played at Sportcomplex Zoudenbalch.)	1,225	613
N/A	(Italy) Bologna FC	1,100	2,325	775
N/A	(Spain) RCD Espanyol	7,224 (Note: Match played in Stadion Galgenwaard.)	9,549	2,387
N/A	(Netherlands) PEC Zwolle	0	9,549	2,387
N/A	(Belgium) SK Beveren	Unknown (Note: Match played in Campoamor, Spain.)	9,549	2,387
N/A	(Netherlands) FC Groningen	0	9,549	2,387
N/A	(Netherlands) Helmond Sport	275	9,824	1,965
N/A	(Netherlands) Heracles Almelo	0 (Note: Match played at FC Utrecht Topsportcentrum.)	9,824	1,965
Eredivisie
2	sc Heerenveen	19,878	19,878	19,878
4	Feyenoord	20,366	40,244	20,122
7	Almere City FC	22,177	62,421	20,807
9	Ajax	22,198	84,619	21,155
11	FC Twente	17,491	102,110	20,429
12	Excelsior	20,235	122,345	20,391
14	AZ	18,267	140,612	20,087
16	RKC Waalwijk	22,033	162,645	20,331
18	PSV	21,727	184,372	20,486
20	FC Volendam	20,161	204,533	20,453
21	Fortuna Sittard	18,463	222,996	20,272
23	Heracles Almelo	20,012	243,008	20,251
26	N.E.C.	21,147	264,155	20,320
28	PEC Zwolle	19,606	283,761	20,269
30	Go Ahead Eagles	22,676	306,437	20,429
32	Vitesse	20,314	326,751	20,422
33	Sparta Rotterdam	22,270	349,021	20,531
KNVB Cup
First round	RKC Waalwijk	10,291	10,291	10,291
Play-offs
Semi-final	Sparta Rotterdam	20,092	20,092	20,092
Final	Go Ahead Eagles	22,574	42,666	21,333

=== Away supporters ===
Round	Opponent	Attendance	Total attendance	Average
Eredivisie
1	PSV	500	500	500
3	PEC Zwolle	500	1,000	500
5	Heracles Almelo	500	1,500	500
6	N.E.C.	500	2,000	500
8	FC Volendam	0	2,000	500
10	Fortuna Sittard	576	2,576	515
13	Sparta Rotterdam	325	2,901	484
15	Go Ahead Eagles	400	3,301	472
17	Vitesse	500	3,801	475
19	Excelsior	400	4,201	467
22	FC Twente	500	4,701	470
24	Ajax	1,000	5,701	518
25	Almere City FC	400	6,101	508
27	Feyenoord	400	6,501	500
29	sc Heerenveen	573	7,074	505
31	RKC Waalwijk	600	7,674	512
34	AZ	750	8,424	527
KNVB Cup
Second round	Feyenoord	+1,000	+1,000	+1,000
