= 2023–24 PEC Zwolle season =

PEC Zwolle
2023–24 season
- Stadium: MAC³PARK Stadion
- Eredivisie: 12th
- KNVB Cup: First round

The 2023–24 season was PEC Zwolle's 114th season in existence and first one back in the Dutch top division Eredivisie. They were also competing in the KNVB Cup.

== Players ==
=== First-team squad ===
As of 31 August 2023

Note: Flags indicate national team as defined under FIFA eligibility rules; some limited exceptions apply. Players may hold more than one non-FIFA nationality.

No.	Pos.	Nation	Player
1	GK	NED	Jasper Schendelaar
2	DF	NED	Bram van Polen (captain)
3	DF	GER	Luis Görlich
4	DF	NED	Sam Kersten
5	DF	NED	Bart van Hintum
6	DF	MAR	Anouar El Azzouzi
7	MF	DEN	Younes Namli
8	MF	NED	Dean Huiberts
9	FW	GER	Lennart Thy
10	FW	NED	Ferdy Druijf (on loan from Rapid Wien)
11	MF	NED	Davy van den Berg
13	DF	FIN	Thomas Lam
14	FW	GRE	Apostolos Vellios
15	DF	IRL	Anselmo García MacNulty

No.	Pos.	Nation	Player
16	FW	NED	Divaio Bobson
17	MF	USA	Anthony Fontana
18	MF	NED	Odysseus Velanas
19	FW	ESP	Nico Serrano (on loan from Athletic Bilbao)
20	DF	GER	Lennart Czyborra (on loan from Genoa)
21	MF	NED	Samir Lagsir
23	MF	IDN	Eliano Reijnders
25	GK	NED	Kenneth Vermeer
28	MF	NED	Zico Buurmeester (on loan from AZ)
30	MF	NZL	Ryan Thomas
34	MF	NED	Nick Fichtinger
40	GK	NED	Mike Hauptmeijer
41	GK	NED	Duke Verduin

== Transfers ==
=== In ===
Pos.	Player	Transferred from	Fee	Date	Source
DF	(Germany) Lennart Czyborra	(Italy) Genoa	Loan	8 July 2023	
FW	(Netherlands) Ferdy Druijf	(Austria) Rapid Vienna	Loan	14 July 2023	
MF	(Denmark) Younes Namli	(Netherlands) Sparta Rotterdam	Loan	21 July 2023	
DF	(Republic of Ireland) Anselmo García MacNulty	(Germany) VfL Wolfsburg	Undisclosed	26 July 2023	
MF	(Spain) Nico Serrano	(Spain) Athletic Bilbao	Loan	10 August 2023	

=== Out ===
Pos.	Player	Transferred to	Fee	Date	Source
MF	(Curaçao) Gervane Kastaneer	Released		1 July 2023	
MF	(Morocco) Younes Taha	(Netherlands) FC Twente		1 July 2023	
MF	(Netherlands) Thomas van den Belt	(Netherlands) Feyenoord		1 July 2023	
DF	(Netherlands) Rav van den Berg	(England) Middlesbrough	Undisclosed	6 July 2023	
DF	(Netherlands) Thomas Beelen	(Netherlands) Feyenoord		10 July 2023	

== Pre-season and friendlies ==
Win Draw Loss Fixtures

14 July 2023 Friendly	Sparta Rotterdam (Netherlands)	3–1	(Netherlands) PEC Zwolle
16:00	Van Crooij 6'; Saito 32'; Verschueren 48'		Vellios 103'
Note: Four periods of 30 minutes.

22 July 2023 Friendly	PEC Zwolle (Netherlands)	1–2	(Netherlands) FC Emmen
13:00

28 July 2023 Friendly	PEC Zwolle (Netherlands)	1–1	(Italy) Venezia
19:00

5 August 2023 Friendly	PEC Zwolle (Netherlands)	0–0	(Netherlands) FC Groningen	Zwolle, Netherlands
16:00				Stadium: MAC³PARK Stadion

16 November 2023 Friendly	FC Utrecht (Netherlands)	3–1	(Netherlands) PEC Zwolle
13:00

== Competitions ==
=== Overall record ===
Competition	First match	Last match	Starting round	Final position	Record							
Competition	First match	Last match	Starting round	Final position	Pld	W	D	L	GF	GA	GD	Win %
Eredivisie	12 August 2023	19 May 2024	Matchday 1	TBD	22	7	6	9	31	34	−3	31.82
KNVB Cup	1 November 2023		First round	First round	1	0	0	1	0	1	−1	0.00
Total					23	7	6	10	31	35	−4	30.43

Last updated: 17 February 2024
Source: Soccerway

=== Eredivisie ===
==== League table ====
Pos	Team	Pld	W	D	L	GF	GA	GD	Pts
10	Fortuna Sittard	34	9	11	14	37	56	−19	38
11	Heerenveen	34	10	7	17	53	70	−17	37
12	PEC Zwolle	34	9	9	16	45	67	−22	36
13	Almere City	34	7	13	14	33	59	−26	34
14	Heracles Almelo	34	9	6	19	41	74	−33	33

Source: Eredivisie
Rules for classification: Season in progress: 1) Most points won; 2) Less points lost; 3) Goal difference; 4) Goals scored; 5) Alphabetical order; End of season: 1) Points; 2) Goal difference; 3) Goals scored; 4) Head-to-head points; 5) Head-to-head goal difference; 6) Head-to-head away goals scored; 7) Play-off if relevant for deciding champion, relegation or participating in a European league, otherwise by draw. 8) Penalty shoot-out (only after a play-off)

==== Results summary ====
Overall								Home						Away					
Pld	W	D	L	GF	GA	GD	Pts	W	D	L	GF	GA	GD	W	D	L	GF	GA	GD
19	5	5	9	27	33	−6	20	2	2	5	9	15	−6	3	3	4	18	18	0

Last updated: 17 February 2024.

==== Results by round ====
Round	1	2	3	4	5	6	7	8	9	10	11	12	13	14	15	16	17	18	19	20	21	22	23	24	25	26	27	28	29	30	31	32	33	34
Ground	H	A	H	A	H	H	A	H	A	A	H	A	H	A	H	A	H	A	H	A	H	A	A	H	A	H	H	A	H	A	A	H	A	H
Result	L	L	W	W	D	L	L	L	W	D	W	L	L	W	L	D	D	D																
Position	12	14	14	10	8	11	11	12	9	9	8	8	11	8	11	11	10	10																

Updated to match(es) played on 17 February 2024. Source:
A = Away; H = Home; W = Win; D = Draw; L = Loss

==== Matches ====
The league fixtures were unveiled on 30 June 2023.

12 August 2023 1	PEC Zwolle	1–2	Sparta Rotterdam	Zwolle
21:00 UTC+2	Thy 82'; Vellios (yellow card) 90+5'; Kersten (yellow card) 90+7'	Report	Kersten 13' (o.g.); Warmerdam (yellow card) 33'; De Guzmán (yellow card) 54'; Kitolano (yellow card) 57'; Bakari (yellow card) 68'; Lauritsen 70'	Stadium: MAC³PARK Stadion; Attendance: 12,500; Referee: Joey Kooij

20 August 2023 2	FC Twente	3–1	PEC Zwolle	Enschede
14:30 UTC+2	Sadílek 18'; Unnerstall (yellow card) 31'; Hilgers (yellow card) 52'; Steijn 76'; Schendelaar 90+4' (o.g.)	Report	Van Hintum (yellow card) 26'; Druijf 33' (pen.); Reijnders (yellow card) 35'; Lam (yellow card) 42'; Van Polen (yellow card) 53'; Kersten (yellow card) 90+7'	Stadium: De Grolsch Veste; Referee: Serdar Gözübüyük

27 August 2023 3	PEC Zwolle	1–0	FC Utrecht	Zwolle
12:15 CEST (UTC+2)	Lam (yellow card) 39'; Druijf 69' (pen.); Van den Berg (yellow card) 76'	Report	Azarkan (yellow card) 34'; Seuntjens (yellow card) 48'; Viergever (yellow card) 84'	Stadium: MAC³PARK stadion Attendance: 14,000; Referee: Laurens Gerrets

2 September 2023 4	Almere City	1–2	PEC Zwolle	Almere
16:30 CEST	Jacobs 90+6'		4' van den Berg; 90+7' Vellios	Stadium: Yanmar Stadion; Attendance: 3,824; Referee: Nagtegaal

17 September 2023 5	PEC Zwolle	1–1	Go Ahead Eagles	Zwolle
12:15 CEST (UTC+2)	Druijf (yellow card) 23'; Reijnders 52'	Report	Amofa (yellow card) 23' (yellow-red card) 47'; Willumsson (yellow card) 45'; Edvardsen 70'; Kuipers (yellow card) 90+5'	Stadium: MAC³PARK Stadion; Attendance: 13,750; Referee: Rob Dieperink

24 September 2023 6	PEC Zwolle	0–3	AZ	Zwolle
16:45 UTC+2		Report	Lahdo 13'; Van Brederode 52'; Pavlidis 90'	Stadium: MAC³PARK Stadion; Referee: Edwin van de Graaf

1 October 2023 7	Heracles Almelo	2–1	PEC Zwolle	Almelo
14:30 CEST	Hansson 69' (pen.), 82'	Report	53' Thy	Stadium: Erve Asito; Attendance: 11,624; Referee: Bas Nijhuis

8 October 2023 8	PEC Zwolle	0–2	Feyenoord	Zwolle
12:15 CEST (UTC+2)		Report	21', 54' Giménez	Stadium: MAC³PARK Stadion; Attendance: 14,000; Referee: Sander van der Eijk

22 October 2023 9	Excelsior Rotterdam	2–4	PEC Zwolle	Rotterdam
14:30 CEST	Baas 39'; Parrott 84'	Report	47' Namli; 66', 81' Vellios; 73' Thy	Stadium: Van Donge & De Roo Stadion; Attendance: 4,400; Referee: van der Laan

27 October 2023 10	Vitesse Arnhem	1–1	PEC Zwolle	Arnhem
20:00 CEST	Manhoef 88'	Report	25' Namli	Stadium: GelreDome; Attendance: 15,023; Referee: Hensgens

5 November 2023 11	PEC Zwolle	2–0	Fortuna Sittard	Zwolle
14:30 CET	van den Berg 42' Velanas 90'			Stadium: MAC³PARK stadion Referee: Makkelie

12 November 2023 12	PSV Eindhoven	4–0	PEC Zwolle	Eindhoven
12:15 CET	Lozano 5'; Til 28' de Jong 57'; Tillman 78'			Stadium: Philips stadion Attendance: 15,023; Referee: Oostrom

25 November 2023 13	PEC Zwolle	1–2	RKC Waalwijk	Zwolle
21:00 CET	van den Berg 29'		14' Stevanović; 50' Lokesa	Stadium: MAC³PARK stadion Referee: van den Kerkhof

2 December 2023 14	Volendam	0–5	PEC Zwolle	Volendam
18:45 CET			59' Velanas; 62', 67', 87' Druijf; 82' Thy	Stadium: Kras Stadion; Referee: Dennis Higler

9 December 2023 15	PEC Zwolle	1–3	NEC	Zwolle
20:00 CET	Namli 75'		43' Tavşan; 46' van Rooij; 90+2' Baas	Stadium: MAC³PARK stadion Attendance: 13,324; Referee: van Boekel

17 December 2023 16	AFC Ajax	2–2	PEC Zwolle	Amsterdam
16:45 CET (UTC+1)	Brobbey 35', 48'; Berghuis (yellow card) 53'	Report	Velanas (yellow card) 30'; MacNulty (yellow card) 54'; Thy 60', 89'; Vellios (yellow card) 90+2'	Stadium: Johan Cruyff Arena (roof open); Attendance: 53,853; Referee: Joey Kooij

13 January 2024 17	PEC Zwolle	2–2	SC Heerenveen	Zwolle
20:00 CET	Namli 64'; Thy 73'		7' (pen.) Tahiri; 90+1' Nunnely	Stadium: MAC³PARK stadion Attendance: 14,000; Referee: Makkelie

20 January 2024 18	AZ	2–2	PEC Zwolle	Alkmaar
20:00 UTC+1	Pavlidis 77' (pen.); Mijnans 90+4'	Report	Thy 57'; Velanas 86'	Stadium: AFAS Stadion; Referee: Allard Lindhout

26 January 2024 19	PEC Zwolle	1–0	Vitesse Arnhem	Zwolle
21:00 UTC+1	Reijnders 16'	Report		Stadium: MAC³PARK Stadion; Attendance: 13,800; Referee: Laurence Gerets

04 February 2024 20	Sparta Rotterdam	0–2	PEC Zwolle	Rotterdam
16:45 UTC+1	Lam 26'; van den Berg 70'	Report		Stadium: Sparta Stadion Het Kasteel; Attendance: 9,446; Referee: Jeroen Manschot

11 February 2024 21	Go Ahead Eagles	1–1	PEC Zwolle	Deventer
12:15 CEST (UTC+2)	Deijl 90+9' (pen.)	Report	Thy 77'	Stadium: De Adelaarshorst; Attendance: 9,469; Referee: Dennis Higler

17 February 2024 22	PEC Zwolle	0–1	Almere City	Zwolle
21:00 UTC+1		Report	Robinet 69'	Stadium: MAC³PARK Stadion; Attendance: 13,714; Referee: Martijn Vos

24 February 2024 23	PEC Zwolle	1–7	PSV	Zwolle
20:00 CET (UTC+1)	Reijnders 41'; Van den Berg (yellow card) 47'; Van Polen (yellow card) 60'	Report	Bakayoko 29', 61'; De Jong 32', 51', 71'; Kersten 73' (o.g.); Pepi 86'	Stadium: MAC³PARK Stadion; Attendance: 14,000; Referee: Alex Bos

3 March 2024 24	SC Heerenveen	2–0	PEC Zwolle	Heerenveen
14:30	Anas Tahiri 45+2' (pen.); Pelle van Amersfoort 67'	Report		Stadium: Abe Lenstra Stadion; Attendance: 22,849; Referee: Robin Hensgens

10 March 2024 25	PEC Zwolle	1–1	Volendam	Zwolle
	Van den Berg 55'	Report	Mirani 70' (yellow card) 45'; Plat (yellow card) 55'	Stadium: MAC³PARK Stadion; Attendance: 13,560; Referee: Pol van Boekel

17 March 2024 26	Fortuna Sittard	3–1	PEC Zwolle	Sittard
20:00 CEST (UTC+2)	Sierhuis 37'; Lonwijk 59'; Alessio 90'	Report	Thy 77'	Stadium: Fortuna Sittard Stadion; Attendance: 11,017; Referee: Marc Nagtegaal

31 March 2024 27	PEC Zwolle	1–3	Ajax	Zwolle
12:15 CEST (UTC+2)	Velanas (yellow card) 9'; Lam (yellow card) 38'; Vellios (yellow card) 71'; Krastev 72'; MacNulty (yellow card) 77'	Report	Hlynsson 12'; Akpom 24', 84'; Mannsverk (yellow card) 50'; Vos (yellow card) 89'	Stadium: MAC³PARK Stadion; Attendance: 14,000; Referee: Jeroen Manschot

3 April 2024 28	FC Utrecht	5–1	PEC Zwolle	Utrecht
20:00 CEST (UTC+2)	Lammers 47'; Toornstra 49'; Lidberg 77', 79'; Blake 87'	Report	Van den Berg (yellow card) 32'; Thy 60'	Stadium: Stadion Galgenwaard; Attendance: 19,606; Referee: Serdar Gözübüyük

6 April 2024 29	PEC Zwolle	2–1	Excelsior	Zwolle
	Anselmo Garcia MacNulty 19'; Odysseus Velanas 66'	Report	Lance Duijvestijn 87'	Stadium: MAC³PARK Stadion; Attendance: 13,655; Referee: Martin Fernando Perezlindo

14 April 2024 30	NEC	2–2	PEC Zwolle	Nijmegen
	Koki Ogawa 47', 53'	Report	Thomas Lam 10'; Odysseus Velanas 68'	Stadium: Goffertstadion; Attendance: 12,540; Referee: Dennis Higler

28 April 2024 31	PEC Zwolle	3–1	Heracles Almelo	Zwolle
	Lennart Thy 16'; Silvester van der Water 69'; Filip Yavorov Krastev 90+3'	Report	Marko Vejinovic 45+2'	Stadium: MAC³PARK Stadion; Attendance: 13,857; Referee: Serdar Gözübüyük

5 May 2024 32	Feyenoord	5–0	PEC Zwolle	Rotterdam
20:00 CEST (UTC+2)	Ueda 33'; Ivanušec 41'; Giménez 67' (pen.), 82'; Geertruida 80'	Report		Stadium: De Kuip; Attendance: 47,500; Referee: Marc Nagtegaal

12 May 2024 33	RKC Waalwijk	1–1	PEC Zwolle	Waalwijk
14:30 CEST (UTC+2)	Margaret 90+1'	Report	Thy 61'; Buurmeester (red card) 89'; MacNulty (yellow card) 90+10'	Stadium: Mandemakers Stadion; Attendance: 6,988; Referee: Bas Nijhuis

19 May 2024 34	PEC Zwolle	1–2	Twente	Zwolle
14:30	García MacNulty 62'		Rots 59'; Van Wolfswinkel 80' (pen.)	Stadium: MAC³PARK Stadion; Referee: Dennis Higler

=== KNVB Cup ===
1 November 2023	AFC	1–0	PEC Zwolle	Amsterdam
20:00 CET	Been 86'	Report		Stadium: Sportpark Goed Genoeg
