= Anselmo García MacNulty =

Irish footballer (born 2003)

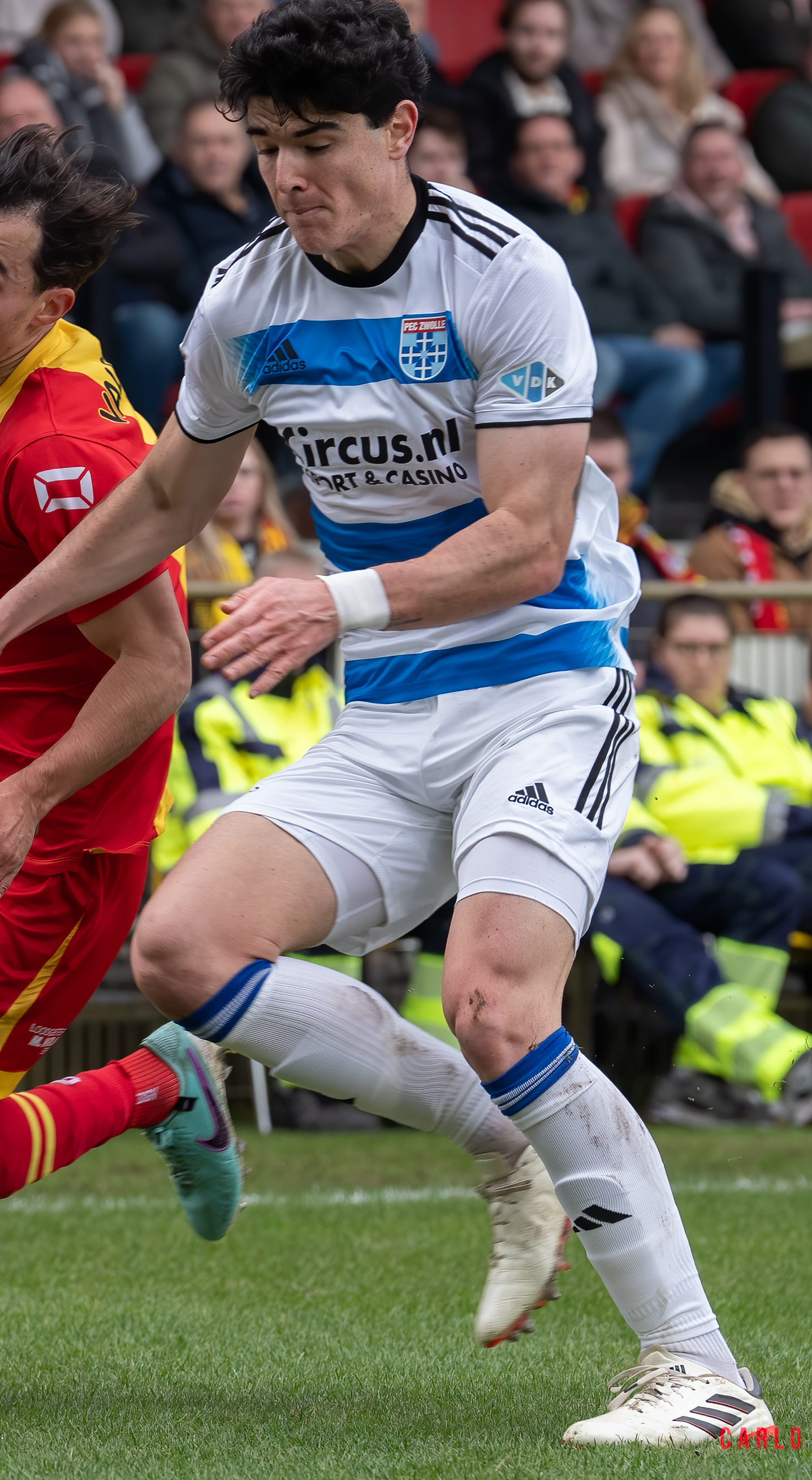
- García MacNulty in 2024 with PEC Zwolle

Personal information
- Date of birth: 19 February 2003 (age 23)
- Place of birth: Seville, Spain
- Height: 1.90 m (6 ft 3 in)
- Position: Centre-back

Team information
- Current team: 1. FC Magdeburg
- Number: 3

Youth career
- 2018–2019: Real Betis
- 2019–2021: VfL Wolfsburg

Senior career*
Years	Team	Apps	(Gls)
2021–2023	VfL Wolfsburg	0	(0)
2022–2023	→ NAC Breda (loan)	32	(0)
2023–2026	PEC Zwolle	97	(5)
2026–	1. FC Magdeburg	0	(0)

International career^{‡}
- Republic of Ireland U15
- Republic of Ireland U17
2021–2022	Republic of Ireland U19	7	(1)
2023–2024	Republic of Ireland U21	12	(0)
- * Club domestic league appearances and goals as of 21 May 2026 ‡ National team caps and goals as of 19:12, 15 October 2024 (UTC)

Anselmo García MacNulty (born 19 February 2003) is a professional footballer who plays as a centre-back for German 2. Bundesliga club 1. FC Magdeburg. Born in Spain, he is a youth international for the Republic of Ireland.

== Club career ==
He came through at his hometown club Real Betis before moving to VfL Wolfsburg in 2019. He joined NAC Breda on loan in July 2022. He made his debut in the Eerste Divisie on 5 August 2022, in a 1–0 win against Helmond Sport.

On 26 July 2023, he signed for Eredivisie side PEC Zwolle on a one-year contract with the option for a second year.

On 10 June 2026, it was announced that García MacNulty would be signing for 2. Bundesliga side 1. FC Magdeburg upon the opening of the transfer window.

== International career ==
Garcia chose to represent Ireland from U15 level, and this continued through to his playing at U19 level for Ireland and then call ups to the Irish U21 squad. He has not, however, ruled out playing for the country of his birth at a later date.

He made his debut for the Republic of Ireland U21 team starting on 26 March 2023 in a 2–1 win against Iceland U21.

== Personal life ==
Born and raised in Seville, Spain but qualifies for Ireland through his mother Maeve who is from County Clare. His father Anselmo Senior is Spanish. He would visit Ireland every summer with his family. His uncle Terry and aunt Una live in Belfast and travel down to watch his matches with Ireland U21s.

== Career statistics ==
As of match played on 10 May 2026

Appearances and goals by club, season and competition
Club	Season	League			National Cup (Note: Includes DFB-Pokal & KNVB Cup)		Other		Total	
Club	Season	Division	Apps	Goals	Apps	Goals	Apps	Goals	Apps	Goals
VfL Wolfsburg	2022–23	Bundesliga	0	0	0	0	–		0	0
NAC Breda (loan)	2022–23	Eerste Divisie	32	0	3	0	3 (Note: Appearances in the 2022–23 Eerste Divisie Playoffs)	0	38	0
PEC Zwolle	2023–24	Eredivisie	31	2	1	0	–		32	1
PEC Zwolle	2024–25	Eredivisie	34	1	1	0	–		35	1
PEC Zwolle	2025–26	Eredivisie	32	2	2	0	–		34	2
PEC Zwolle	Total		97	5	4	0	–		101	4
1. FC Magdeburg	2026–27	2. Bundesliga	0	0	0	0	–		0	0
Career total			129	5	7	0	3	0	139	5
