= Eliano Reijnders =

Indonesian footballer (born 2000)

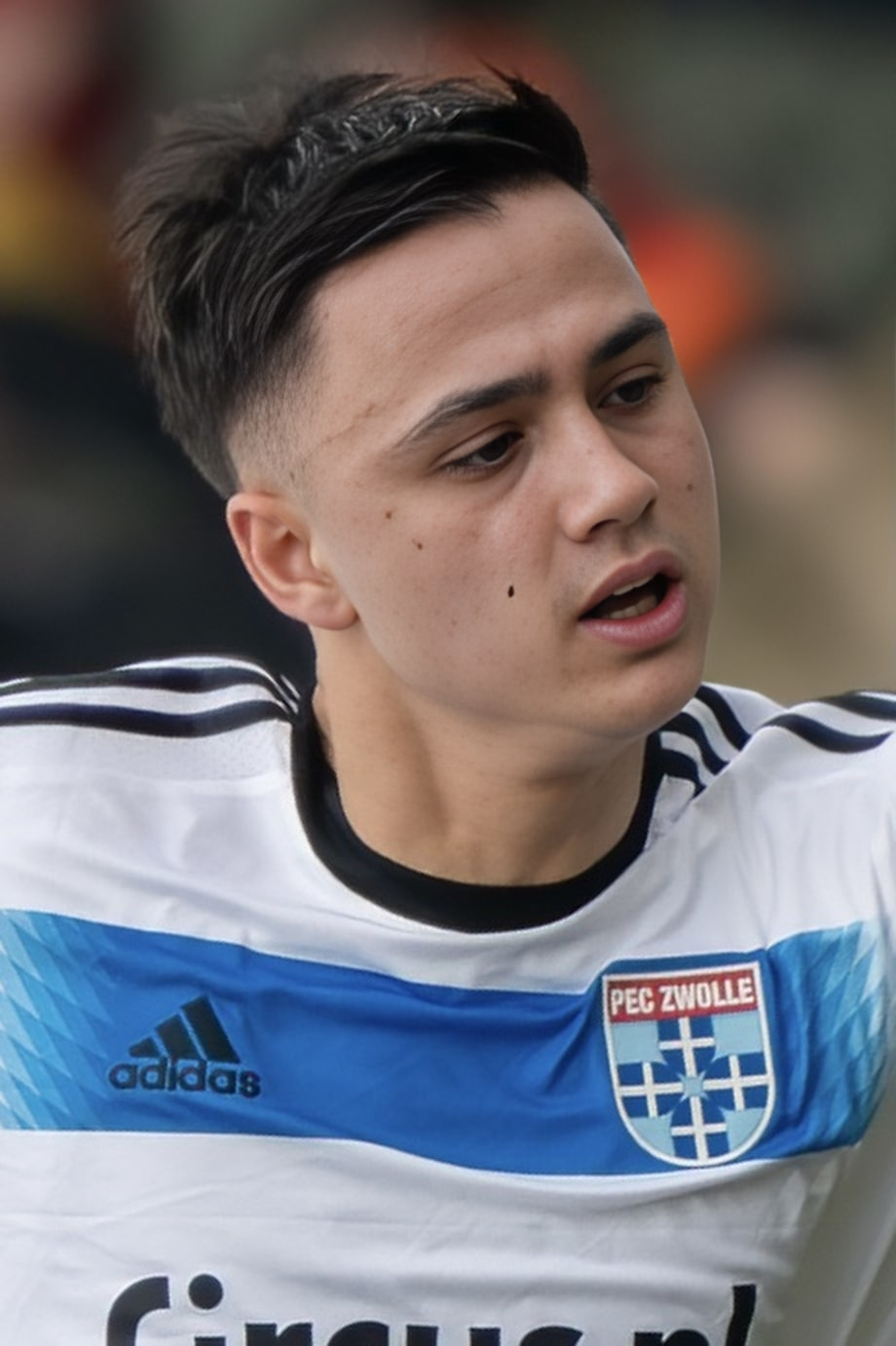
- Reijnders playing for PEC Zwolle in 2024

Personal information
- Full name: Eliano Johannes Reijnders
- Date of birth: 23 October 2000 (age 26)
- Place of birth: Tampere, Finland
- Height: 1.68 m (5 ft 6 in)
- Positions: Winger; full-back

Team information
- Current team: Persib Bandung
- Number: 2

Youth career
- PEC Zwolle

Senior career*
Years	Team	Apps	(Gls)
2018–2025	PEC Zwolle	107	(7)
2022–2023	→ Jong Utrecht (loan)	35	(0)
2025–	Persib Bandung	34	(0)

International career^{‡}
2024–	Indonesia	13	(1)
Medal record
Men's football
Representing Indonesia
FIFA Series
Runner-up	2026 Indonesia
- * Club domestic league appearances and goals as of 25 October 2026 ‡ National team caps and goals as of 15:20, 7 August 2026 (UTC)

Eliano Johannes Reijnders (born 23 October 2000) is a professional footballer who plays as a winger or a full-back for Super League club Persib Bandung. Born in Finland and raised in the Netherlands, he represents the Indonesia national team.

== Club career ==
Reijnders is a product of PEC Zwolle and made his senior debut in 2018. On 24 August 2022, Reijnders joined Jong Utrecht on a season-long loan with an option to buy.

On 31 August 2025, PEC Zwolle announced his departure from the club. He joined Persib Bandung, from the country he plays his international games for, on a permanent transfer.

== International career ==
In September 2024, Reijnders confirmed that he had decided to represent Indonesia at international level. On 1 October 2024, he was called up to the national team for the 2026 FIFA World Cup qualifiers matches against Bahrain and China. On 10 October 2024, he made his debut against Bahrain in a 2–2 draw. He scored his first goal for Indonesia on 5 September 2025, in a 6–0 home win over Chinese Taipei.

== Personal life ==
Reijnders is the son of Martin Reijnders and the brother of Tijjani Reijnders, who is a professional footballer playing for Al-Qadsiah. He was born in Finland while his father played for Haka. Reijnders is of Indonesian descent through his Moluccan mother.

On 30 September 2024, Eliano Reijnders officially obtained Indonesian citizenship after being sworn in as a citizen of Indonesia during a ceremony at the Indonesian Embassy alongside Mees Hilgers.

== Career statistics ==
=== Club ===
As of match played 25 October 2026

Appearances and goals by club, season and competition
Club	Season	League			Cup		Continental		Other		Total	
Club	Season	Division	Apps	Goals	Apps	Goals	Apps	Goals	Apps	Goals	Apps	Goals
PEC Zwolle	2020–21	Eredivisie	29	3	1	0	—		—		30	3
PEC Zwolle	2021–22	Eredivisie	23	0	3	0	—		—		26	0
PEC Zwolle	2023–24	Eredivisie	32	3	1	0	—		—		34	3
PEC Zwolle	2024–25	Eredivisie	21	1	1	0	—		—		22	1
PEC Zwolle	2025–26	Eredivisie	2	0	0	0	—		—		2	0
PEC Zwolle	Total		107	7	6	0	0	0	0	0	113	7
Jong Utrecht (loan)	2022–23	Eerste Divisie	35	0	—		—		—		35	0
Persib Bandung	2025–26	Super League	28	0	—		8 (Note: Appearance(s) in AFC Champions League Two)	0	—		35	0
Persib Bandung	2026–27	Super League	6	0	—		4	0	1 (Note: Appearance(s) in ASEAN Club Championship)	0	11	0
Career total			176	7	6	0	12	0	1	0	195	7

=== International ===
As of match played 7 August 2026

Appearances and goals by national team and year
National team	Year	Apps	Goals
Indonesia	2024	1	0
Indonesia	2025	6	1
Indonesia	2026	6	0
Total		13	1

As of match played 5 September 2025
Indonesia score listed first, score column indicates score after each Reijnders goal

List of international goals scored by Eliano Reijnders
No.	Date	Venue	Cap	Opponent	Score	Result	Competition
1	5 September 2025	Gelora Bung Tomo Stadium, Surabaya, Indonesia	4	Chinese Taipei	4–0	6–0	Friendly

== Honours ==
Persib Bandung

- Super League: 2025–26

Indonesia

- FIFA Series runner-up: 2026

== See also ==
- List of Indonesia international footballers born outside Indonesia
