= Can Bozdoğan =

German footballer (born 2001)

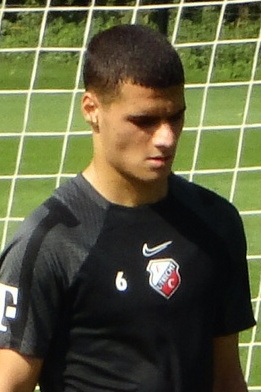
- Bozdoğan with FC Utrecht during training in 2022

Personal information
- Date of birth: 5 April 2001 (age 25)
- Place of birth: Cologne, Germany
- Height: 1.72 m (5 ft 8 in)
- Position: Central midfielder

Team information
- Current team: Çaykur Rizespor
- Number: 70

Youth career
- –2008: 1. JFS Köln
- 2008–2019: 1. FC Köln
- 2019–2020: Schalke 04

Senior career*
Years	Team	Apps	(Gls)
2020–2023	Schalke 04	17	(0)
2020–2021	Schalke 04 II	3	(0)
2021–2022	→ Beşiktaş (loan)	23	(1)
2022–2023	→ Utrecht (loan)	24	(1)
2023–2026	Utrecht	58	(5)
2026–	Çaykur Rizespor	2	(0)

International career
2016	Germany U15	2	(0)
2016–2017	Germany U16	4	(1)
2017–2018	Germany U17	9	(3)
2018	Germany U18	2	(0)
2020	Germany U20	1	(0)
- * Club domestic league appearances and goals as of 16 October 2026

Can Bozdoğan (born 5 April 2001) is a German professional footballer who plays as a central midfielder for Turkish Süper Lig club Çaykur Rizespor.

== Career ==
=== Schalke 04 ===
Bozdoğan made his debut for Schalke 04 in the Bundesliga on 14 June 2020, starting in the home match against Bayer Leverkusen.

==== Beşiktaş (loan) ====
On 27 August 2021, he agreed to join Süper Lig club Beşiktaş on a season-long loan with an option to make the move permanent.

=== Utrecht ===
On 26 July 2022, he joined Eredivisie club Utrecht, again on a season-long loan with an option to make the move permanent. On 30 May 2023, he completed the permanent move.

== Personal life ==
Born in Germany, Bozdoğan is of Turkish descent.

== Career statistics ==
As of match played 2 May 2026

Appearances and goals by club, season and competition
Club	Season	League			National cup (Note: Includes DFB-Pokal, KNVB Cup)		Europe		Other		Total	
Club	Season	Division	Apps	Goals	Apps	Goals	Apps	Goals	Apps	Goals	Apps	Goals
Schalke 04	2019–20	Bundesliga	3	0	0	0	—		—		3	0
Schalke 04	2020–21	Bundesliga	14	0	1	0	—		—		15	0
Schalke 04	Total		17	0	1	0	—		—		18	0
Beşiktaş (loan)	2021–22	Süper Lig	23	1	0	0	4 (Note: Appearances in UEFA Champions League)	0	—		27	1
Utrecht (loan)	2022–23	Eredivisie	24	1	3	0	—		2 (Note: Appearances in Eredivisie European competition play-offs)	0	29	1
Utrecht	2023–24	Eredivisie	31	3	1	0	—		2	0	34	3
Utrecht	2024–25	Eredivisie	9	1	1	1	—		—		10	2
Utrecht	2025–26	Eredivisie	18	1	2	0	6 (Note: Appearances in UEFA Europa League)	0	0	0	26	1
Utrecht	Total		58	5	4	1	6	0	2	0	70	6
Career total			122	4	8	1	10	0	4	0	144	8
