= Younes Namli =

Danish footballer (born 1994)

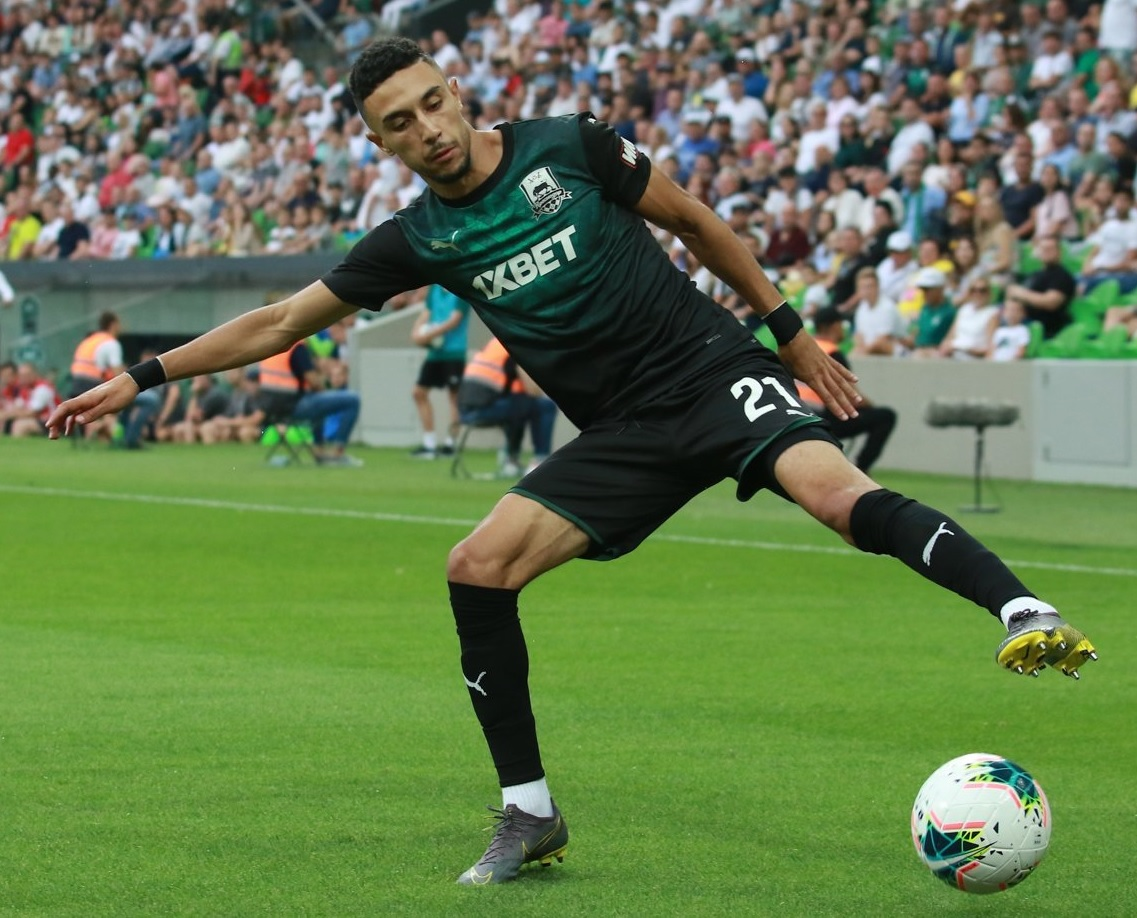
- Namli with Krasnodar in 2019

Personal information
- Date of birth: 20 June 1994 (age 32)
- Place of birth: Copenhagen, Denmark
- Height: 1.80 m (5 ft 11 in)
- Position: Winger

Team information
- Current team: PEC Zwolle
- Number: 9

Senior career*
| Years | Team | Apps | (Gls) |
| 2012–2015 | AB | 47 | (6) |
| 2015–2017 | Heerenveen | 33 | (0) |
| 2017–2019 | PEC Zwolle | 65 | (9) |
| 2019–2022 | Krasnodar | 10 | (1) |
| 2020–2021 | → Colorado Rapids (loan) | 28 | (3) |
| 2022 | → Sparta Rotterdam (loan) | 14 | (1) |
| 2022–2023 | Sparta Rotterdam | 26 | (1) |
| 2023–2025 | PEC Zwolle | 48 | (8) |
| 2025–2026 | Le Havre | 13 | (0) |
| 2026– | PEC Zwolle | 13 | (2) |
- * Club domestic league appearances and goals as of 21 May 2026

Younes Namli (born 20 June 1994) is a Danish professional footballer who plays as a winger for Eredivisie club PEC Zwolle.

== Career ==
After spending three seasons in the Danish 1st Division with AB, Namli signed a two-and-a-half-year contract with Dutch club Heerenveen in January 2015 following a successful trial. There was little interest, and no bids, from any other Danish clubs, something which surprised Thomas Nørgaard, his manager at AB, who praised Namli's talent. He was previously listed in September 2014 as a star for the future by Danish magazine BT.

After two seasons in Heerenveen, it was reported in June 2017 that Namli had signed a contract with another Dutch team, PEC Zwolle.

On 22 May 2019, he signed a four-year contract with Russian Premier League club FC Krasnodar.

On 15 January 2020, the Colorado Rapids acquired Namli on a two-year loan from FC Krasnodar. Namli appeared in 18 matches, including MLS Cup Playoffs, and adding two goals and four assists, and he also completed 66 dribbles, which was the second-highest in MLS that season. Namli was named to the MLS Team of the Week in Week 11 for his two-assist performance to help Colorado defeat Real Salt Lake, and reclaim the Rocky Mountain Cup. Following the 2021 season, Colorado declined their purchase option on Namli.

On 11 January 2022, he joined Sparta Rotterdam back in the Netherlands on loan until 30 June 2022. On 2 July 2022, Namli's agent stated that his contract with Krasnodar had been terminated.

On 11 July 2022, Namli returned to Sparta Rotterdam on a one-year contract.

On 21 July 2023, Namli returned to PEC Zwolle on a one-year deal. After leaving the club at the end of the 2023–24 season, on 9 September 2024 Namli returned to Zwolle once again, on a contract until 30 June 2025.

On 6 August 2025, Namli joined Le Havre on a free transfer, signing a one-year contract.

On 6 January 2026, Le Havre announced that Namli's contract was terminated, stating personal reasons. He subsequently rejoined his old club PEC Zwolle, and signed a contract until the summer of 2028.

== Personal life ==
Namli is of Moroccan origin.

== Career statistics ==
As of match played 21 December 2025

Appearances and goals by club, season and competition
| Club | Season | League | | | Domestic Cup (Note: Includes the KNVB Cup, Russian Cup, U.S. Open Cup and Coupe de France.) | | League Cup | | Continental | | Other | | Total | |
| Club | Season | Division | Apps | Goals | Apps | Goals | Apps | Goals | Apps | Goals | Apps | Goals | Apps | Goals |
|---|---|---|---|---|---|---|---|---|---|---|---|---|---|---|
| AB | 2013–14 | 1. Division | 30 | 2 | 0 | 0 | – | | – | | – | | 30 | 2 |
| AB | 2014–15 | 1. Division | 17 | 4 | 0 | 0 | – | | – | | – | | 17 | 4 |
| AB | Total | | 47 | 6 | 0 | 0 | 0 | 0 | 0 | 0 | 0 | 0 | 47 | 6 |
| Heerenveen | 2014–15 | Eredivisie | 12 | 0 | 0 | 0 | – | | – | | – | | 12 | 0 |
| Heerenveen | 2015–16 | Eredivisie | 3 | 0 | 0 | 0 | – | | – | | – | | 3 | 0 |
| Heerenveen | 2016–17 | Eredivisie | 18 | 0 | 3 | 2 | – | | – | | – | | 21 | 2 |
| Heerenveen | Total | | 33 | 0 | 3 | 2 | 0 | 0 | 0 | 0 | 0 | 0 | 36 | 2 |
| PEC Zwolle | 2017–18 | Eredivisie | 32 | 5 | 4 | 2 | – | | – | | – | | 36 | 7 |
| PEC Zwolle | 2018–19 | Eredivisie | 33 | 4 | 3 | 0 | – | | – | | – | | 36 | 4 |
| PEC Zwolle | Total | | 65 | 9 | 7 | 2 | 0 | 0 | 0 | 0 | 0 | 0 | 72 | 11 |
| FC Krasnodar | 2019–20 | Russian Premier League | 10 | 1 | 1 | 0 | – | | 7 (Note: Appearances in UEFA Champions League and UEFA Europa League) | 0 | – | | 18 | 1 |
| Colorado Rapids (loan) | 2020 | Major League Soccer | 17 | 2 | – | | – | | – | | 1 (Note: Appearances in the MLS Cup Playoffs) | 0 | 18 | 2 |
| Colorado Rapids (loan) | 2021 | Major League Soccer | 11 | 1 | – | | – | | – | | 1 (Note: MLSP) | 0 | 12 | 1 |
| Colorado Rapids (loan) | Total | | 28 | 3 | 0 | 0 | 0 | 0 | 0 | 0 | 2 | 0 | 30 | 3 |
| Sparta Rotterdam (loan) | 2021–22 | Eredivisie | 14 | 1 | – | | – | | – | | – | | 14 | 1 |
| Sparta Rotterdam | 2022–23 | Eredivisie | 26 | 1 | – | | – | | – | | 4 (Note: Appearances in Conference League play-offs) | 0 | 30 | 1 |
| PEC Zwolle | 2023–24 | Eredivisie | 30 | 4 | 1 | 0 | – | | – | | – | | 31 | 4 |
| PEC Zwolle | 2024–25 | Eredivisie | 18 | 4 | 0 | 0 | – | | – | | – | | 18 | 4 |
| PEC Zwolle | Total | | 48 | 8 | 1 | 0 | – | | – | | – | | 49 | 8 |
| Le Havre | 2025–26 | Ligue 1 | 12 | 0 | 1 | 0 | – | | – | | – | | 12 | 0 |
| PEC Zwolle | 2025–26 | Eredivisie | 0 | 0 | – | | – | | – | | – | | 0 | 0 |
| Career total | | | 283 | 30 | 13 | 4 | 0 | 0 | 7 | 0 | 6 | 0 | 308 | 34 |

== Honours ==
Individual

- Eredivisie Team of the Month: May 2025,
