= Nick Fichtinger =

Dutch footballer (born 2004)

Personal information
- Full name: Nick Fichtinger
- Date of birth: 6 April 2004 (age 22)
- Place of birth: Zeist, Netherlands
- Position: Midfielder

Team information
- Current team: PEC Zwolle
- Number: 34

Youth career
- SV Saestum
- 2019–: PEC Zwolle

Senior career*
Years	Team	Apps	(Gls)
2023–	PEC Zwolle	48	(0)
- * Club domestic league appearances and goals as of 1 July 2026

Nick Fichtinger (born 6 April 2004) is a Dutch professional footballer who plays as a midfielder for PEC Zwolle.

== Club career ==
Fichtinger started playing football at the age of four with SV Saestum. In early 2019, he was scouted by three professional clubs and went on trial with PSV, PEC Zwolle and N.E.C.. He subsequently joined the youth academy of PEC Zwolle.

In 2023, Fichtinger joined the first-team squad during the club's pre-season training camp. He was named on the bench for the opening match of the season against Sparta Rotterdam. He made his professional debut in the second league match against FC Twente, coming on in the 68th minute as a substitute for Thomas Lam.

== Career statistics ==
As of 9 July 2026

Appearances and goals by club, season and competition
Club	Season	League			KNVB Beker		Other		Total	
Club	Season	Division	Apps	Goals	Apps	Goals	Apps	Goals	Apps	Goals
PEC Zwolle	2023–24	Eredivisie	6	0	0	0	0	0	6	0
PEC Zwolle	2024–25	Eredivisie	22	0	1	0	0	0	22	0
PEC Zwolle	2025–26	Eredivisie	20	0	2	0	0	0	12	0
Career total			48	0	3	0	0	0	40	0
