= Oscar Fraulo =

Danish footballer (born 2003)

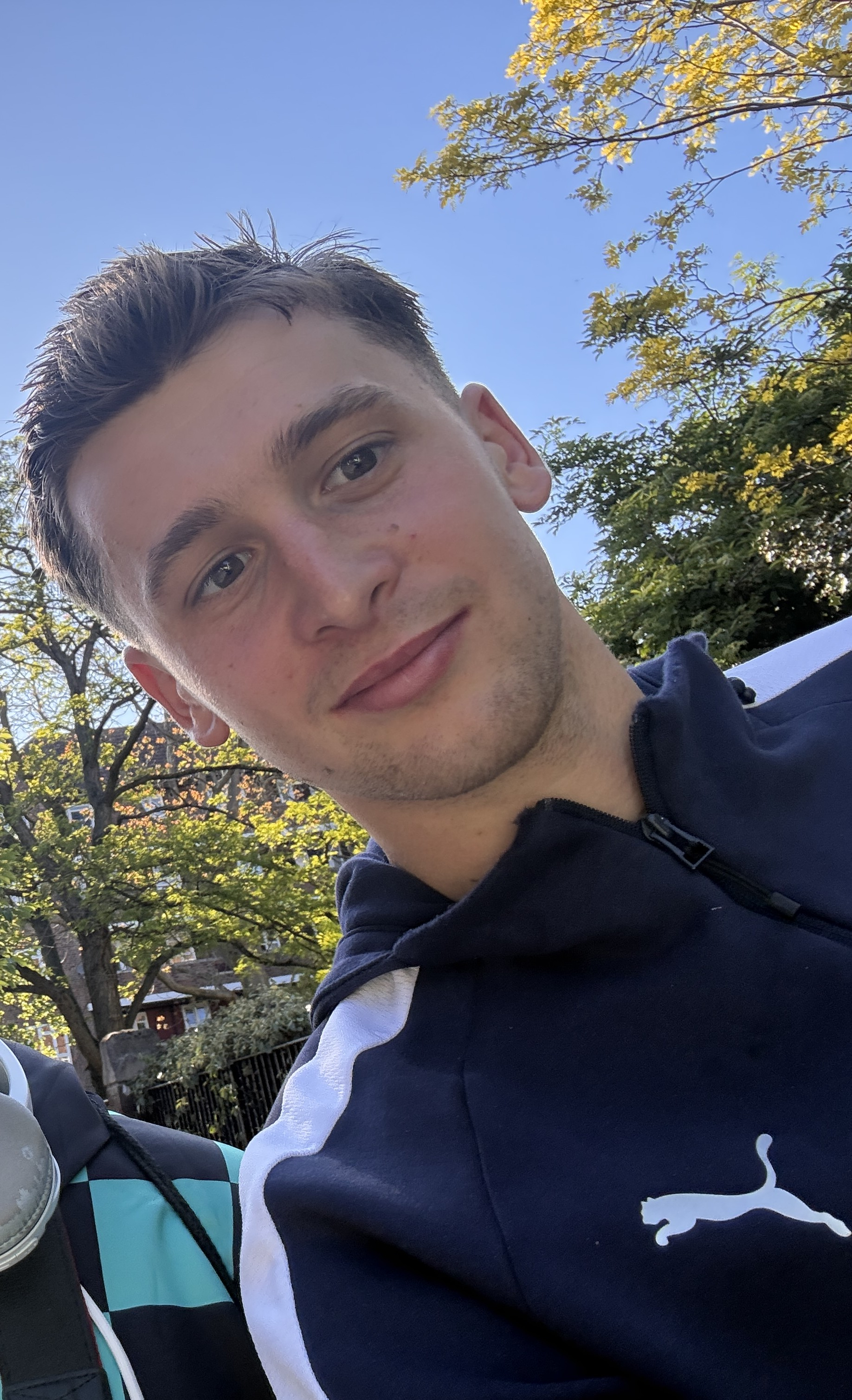
- Fraulo in 2026

Personal information
- Full name: Oscar Luigi Fraulo
- Date of birth: 6 December 2003 (age 22)
- Place of birth: Odense, Denmark
- Height: 1.80 m (5 ft 11 in)
- Position: Midfielder

Team information
- Current team: Derby County
- Number: 29

Youth career
- 2010–2017: OKS
- 2017–2021: Midtjylland

Senior career*
Years	Team	Apps	(Gls)
2021–2022	Midtjylland	1	(0)
2022–2023	Borussia Mönchengladbach II	18	(1)
2022–2026	Borussia Mönchengladbach	6	(1)
2023–2025	→ Utrecht (loan)	59	(5)
2026–	Derby County	30	(1)

International career^{‡}
2019	Denmark U16	4	(1)
2019–2020	Denmark U17	4	(0)
2021–2022	Denmark U19	5	(2)
2022	Denmark U20	2	(0)
2023–2025	Denmark U21	20	(0)
- * Club domestic league appearances and goals as of 22:33, 6 November 2026 (UTC) ‡ National team caps and goals as of 22 June 2025

Oscar Luigi Fraulo (born 6 December 2003) is a Danish professional footballer who plays as a midfielder for EFL Championship club Derby County.

== Early life ==
Fraulo was born in Odense, Denmark, to a Danish mother and an Italian father. He had begun playing football at an early age for OKS before moving to the Midtjylland academy at age 13.

== Club career ==
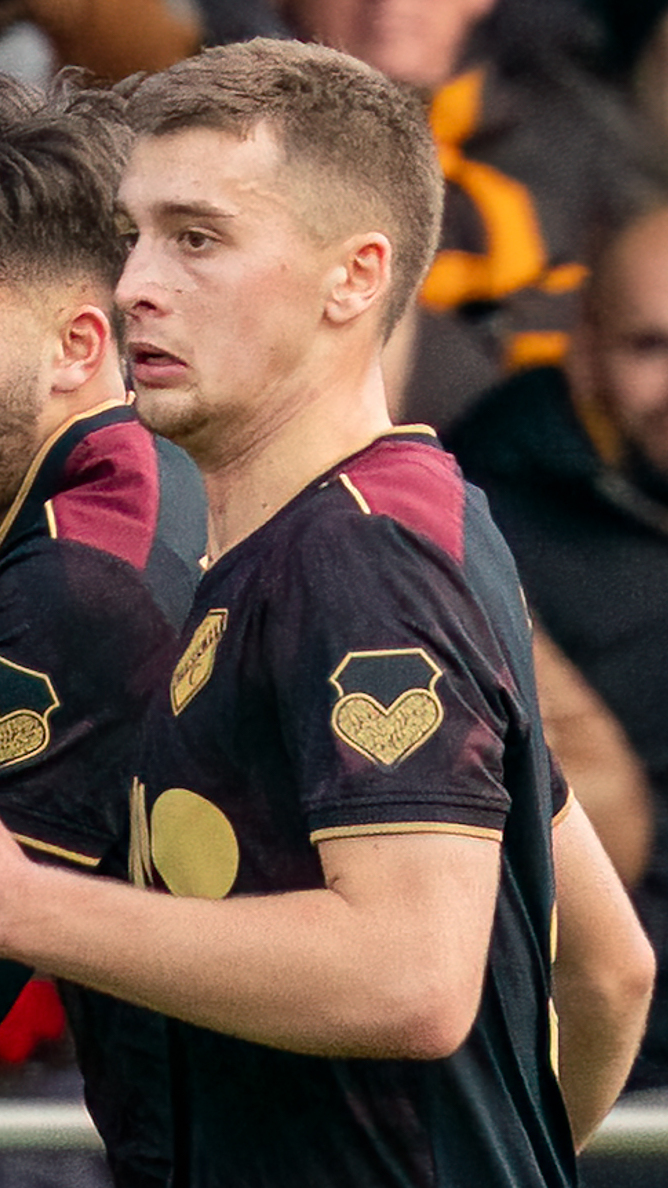
Fraulo with FC Utrecht in 2023

Fraulo made his professional debut for Midtjylland on 10 August 2021, coming on as a substitute during the Champions League qualifying 1–0 home defeat against PSV Eindhoven, that saw the Danish club losing on aggregate, and therefore entering the Europa League.

=== Borussia Mönchengladbach ===
On 24 June 2022, Fraulo signed a four-year contract with Bundesliga club Borussia Mönchengladbach.

On 23 August 2023, Fraulo joined Eredivisie side Utrecht on a season-long loan deal. He scored his first goal for the club on 22 October, helping Utrecht to a late 4–3 victory against Ajax by chipping opposing goalkeeper Diant Ramaj in the 90th minute.

=== Derby County ===
On 2 January 2026, Fraulo signed for EFL Championship club Derby County on a three-and-a-half year deal for an undisclosed compensation fee, reported to be between £250,000 and £350,000. Fraulo made his Derby debut on 11 January 2026, starting and playing the first of an FA Cup tie against Leeds United. On 17 January 2026, he made his league debut in a 1–0 win at Preston North End as a 72nd-minute substitute for Rhian Brewster. After five appearances from the bench, Fraulo made his first league start for Derby County in a 2–0 win over Swansea City, playing 72 minutes. On 25 April 2026, Fraulo scored his first goal for Derby County in the 25th minute of a 3–2 victory at Queens Park Rangers. Fraulo played 20 times during the 2025–26 season for Derby County.

== Career statistics ==
As of match played 6 November 2026

Appearances and goals by club, season and competition
Club	Season	League			Cup		League cup		Europe		Other		Total	
Club	Season	Division	Apps	Goals	Apps	Goals	Apps	Goals	Apps	Goals	Apps	Goals	Apps	Goals
Midtjylland	2021–22	Danish Superliga	1	0	2	0	—		1 (Note: Appearances in UEFA Champions League)	0	—		4	0
Borussia Mönchengladbach II	2022–23	Regionalliga West	17	1	—		—		—		—		17	1
Borussia Mönchengladbach II	2023–24	Regionalliga West	1	0	—		—		—		—		1	0
Borussia Mönchengladbach II	Total		18	1	—		—		—		—		18	1
Borussia Mönchengladbach	2022–23	Bundesliga	2	0	0	0	—		—		—		2	0
Borussia Mönchengladbach	2025–26	Bundesliga	4	1	1	0	—		—		—		5	1
Borussia Mönchengladbach	Total		6	1	1	0	—		—		—		7	1
Utrecht (loan)	2023–24	Eredivisie	32	2	2	1	—		—		1 (Note: Appearances in European play-offs)	0	35	3
Utrecht (loan)	2024–25	Eredivisie	27	3	2	0	—		—		—		29	3
Utrecht (loan)	Total		59	5	4	1	—		—		1	0	64	6
Derby County	2025–26	Championship	19	1	1	0	—		—		—		20	1
Derby County	2026–27	Championship	11	0	0	0	1	0	—		—		13	0
Derby County	Total		30	1	1	0	1	0	—		0	0	32	1
Career total			114	8	8	1	1	0	1	0	1	0	125	9

== Honours ==
Individual

- Eredivisie Talent of the Month: October 2024
