= Davy van den Berg =

Dutch footballer (born 2000)

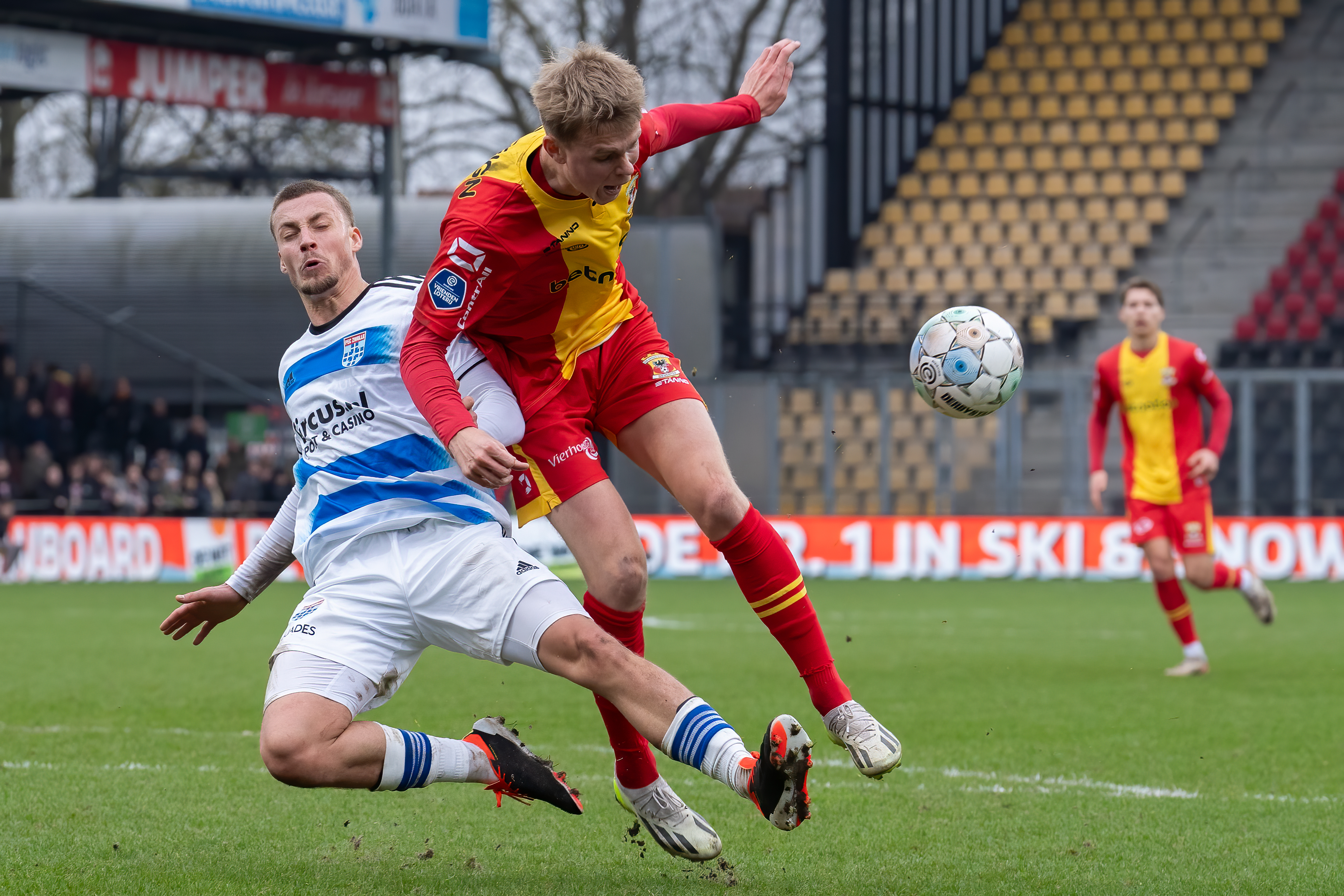

Personal information
- Full name: Dave Johannes Andreas van den Berg
- Date of birth: 4 February 2000 (age 26)
- Place of birth: Uden, Netherlands
- Height: 1.90 m (6 ft 3 in)
- Position: Midfielder

Team information
- Current team: Utrecht
- Number: 34

Youth career
- UDI '19
- 2008–2018: PSV
- 2019–2021: Utrecht

Senior career*
Years	Team	Apps	(Gls)
2019–2022	Jong Utrecht	40	(1)
2020–2022	Utrecht	1	(0)
2022	→ Roda JC Kerkrade (loan)	15	(1)
2022–2025	PEC Zwolle	95	(12)
2025–	Utrecht	14	(1)
2026	→ Luton Town (loan)	15	(0)

International career^{‡}
2014–2015	Netherlands U15	6	(0)
2015–2016	Netherlands U16	4	(0)
2018	Netherlands U19	2	(0)
- * Club domestic league appearances and goals as of 22:03, 18 October 2026 (UTC) ‡ National team caps and goals as of 13:17, 1 June 2020 (UTC)

Dave Johannes Andreas van den Berg (born 4 February 2000) is a Dutch professional footballer who plays as a midfielder for Eredivisie club Utrecht.

== Club career ==
=== Early years ===
Van den Berg played youth football for his hometown club UDI '19, before joining the PSV Eindhoven youth academy in 2008.

On 3 October 2018, Van den Berg was a part of the PSV under-19 side competing in the UEFA Youth League, under head coach Ruud van Nistelrooy. He made his debut in the competition against Inter Milan's under-19s, coming on as a late substitute for Rico Zeegers in a 2–1 win. At the end of 2018, Van den Berg disagreed with his coach Van Nistelrooy, and his contract was terminated by mutual consent.

=== Utrecht ===
Van den Berg joined FC Utrecht on 13 February 2019 on a free transfer, signing a contract until 2021 with an option for an additional year. He made his debut for the reserve team Jong FC Utrecht, competing in the second-tier Eerste Divisie, on 18 October 2019 in a 2–2 home draw against De Graafschap, coming on as a substitute for Hicham Acheffay.

On 9 September 2020, his contract was extended until 2023 including an option for an additional year.

He made his Eredivisie debut for Utrecht on 29 August 2021 as a late substitute in a game against Feyenoord.

On 31 January 2022, van den Berg was loaned to Roda JC Kerkrade.

=== PEC Zwolle ===
Van den Berg joined PEC Zwolle on 4 August 2022, signing a two-year contract with an option for an additional year. He made his debut for the club on 7 August, coming off the bench for Tomislav Mrkonjić in the second half of a 2–1 league win over De Graafschap.

=== Return to Utrecht ===
On 9 May 2025, Van den Berg agreed to return to Utrecht with a three-year contract.

On 3 February 2026, Van den Berg joined EFL League One side Luton Town, with an obligation to buy.

== Personal life ==
Van den Berg announced in 2023 that he had converted to Islam. He became interested in the religion following the death of his mother when he was 15.

== Career statistics ==
As of match played 18 October 2026

Appearances and goals by club, season and competition
Club	Season	League			Cup		Continental		Other		Total	
Club	Season	Division	Apps	Goals	Apps	Goals	Apps	Goals	Apps	Goals	Apps	Goals
Jong Utrecht	2019–20	Eerste Divisie	14	0	—		—		—		14	0
Jong Utrecht	2020–21	Eerste Divisie	14	0	—		—		—		14	0
Jong Utrecht	2021–22	Eerste Divisie	12	1	—		—		—		12	0
Jong Utrecht	Total		40	1	—		—		—		40	1
Utrecht	2020–21	Eredivisie	0	0	1	0	—		—		1	0
Utrecht	2021–22	Eredivisie	1	0	1	0	—		—		2	0
Utrecht	Total		1	0	2	0	—		—		3	0
Roda JC Kerkrade (loan)	2021–22	Eerste Divisie	15	1	0	0	—		2 (Note: Appearances in the 2021–22 Eerste Divisie promotion play-offs)	0	17	1
PEC Zwolle	2022–23	Eerste Divisie	33	3	2	0	—		—		35	3
PEC Zwolle	2023–24	Eredivisie	30	5	1	0	—		—		31	5
PEC Zwolle	2024–25	Eredivisie	32	4	1	0	—		—		33	4
PEC Zwolle	Total		95	12	4	0	—		—		99	12
Utrecht	2025–26	Eredivisie	5	1	0	0	4 (Note: Appearances in UEFA Europa League)	0	—		9	1
Utrecht	2026–27	Eredivisie	9	0	0	0	—		—		9	0
Utrecht	Total		14	1	0	0	4	0	—		18	1
Luton Town (loan)	2025–26	EFL League One	15	0	0	0	—		2 (Note: Appearance(s) in EFL Trophy)	0	17	0
Career total			180	15	6	0	4	0	4	0	194	15
