= Isac Lidberg =

Swedish footballer (born 1998)

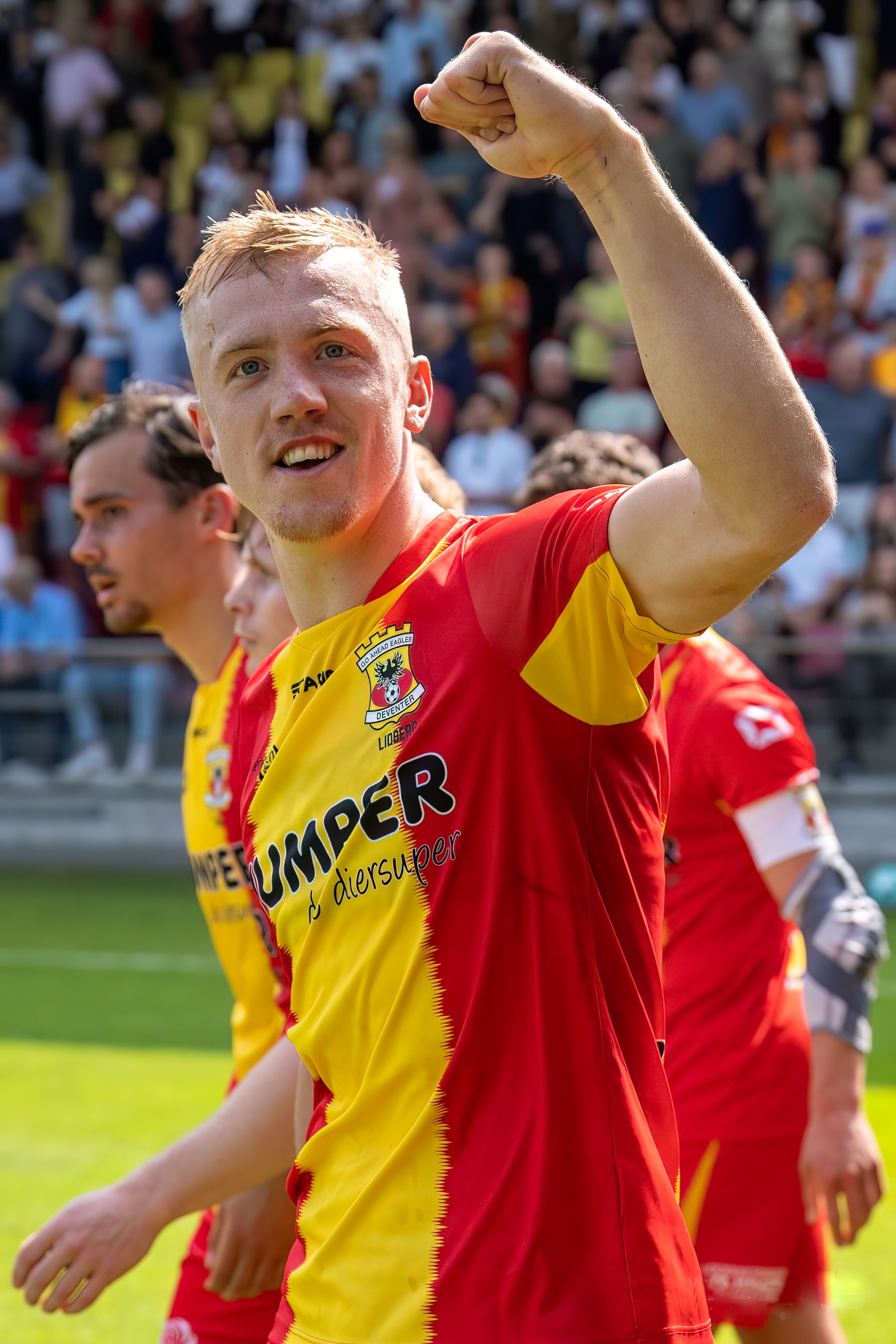
- Lidberg with Go Ahead Eagles in 2023

Personal information
- Full name: Isac Alexi Sivert Lidberg
- Date of birth: 8 September 1998 (age 28)
- Place of birth: Stockholm, Sweden
- Height: 1.85 m (6 ft 1 in)
- Position: Forward

Team information
- Current team: Borussia Mönchengladbach
- Number: 3

Youth career
- –2010: Hägerstens SK
- 2010–2014: Hammarby IF

Senior career*
Years	Team	Apps	(Gls)
2015–2017	Hammarby IF	7	(0)
2016	→ Enskede IK (loan)	14	(6)
2017	Åtvidabergs FF	22	(5)
2018–2020	Start	0	(0)
2018	→ Jerv (loan)	11	(0)
2018	→ HamKam (loan)	5	(0)
2019	→ Brommapojkarna (loan)	18	(3)
2020–2021	Gefle	37	(22)
2021–2023	Go Ahead Eagles	65	(11)
2023–2024	Utrecht	20	(4)
2024–2026	Darmstadt 98	58	(31)
2026–	Borussia Mönchengladbach	7	(1)

International career^{‡}
2014–2015	Sweden U17	14	(7)
2015–2017	Sweden U19	17	(10)
2024–	Sweden	3	(0)
- * Club domestic league appearances and goals as of 31 October 2026 ‡ National team caps and goals as of 19:42, 20 November 2025 (UTC)

Isac Alexi Sivert Lidberg (born 8 September 1998) is a Swedish professional footballer who plays as a forward for German Bundesliga club Borussia Mönchengladbach and the Sweden national team.

== Club career ==
=== Hammarby IF ===
Lidberg started out his football career with local side Hägerstens SK, but moved to Hammarby Sjöstad and began to play for Hammarby IF as an eleven-year-old. Advancing through the youth teams, Lidberg played his first game for Hammarby's under 21-team against GIF Sundsvall 2014 as a substitute, and scored a 2–1 goal within a minute. In March 2015, Hammarby offered him a 3-year senior contract, which he signed.

The senior debut came the same year in Allsvenskan, when Lidberg got substituted with Linus Hallenius in a game against Falkenbergs FF on 13 July. The 16-year-old Lidberg became the youngest player ever to represent Hammarby in Allsvenskan. He played his second game in Allsvenskan on the last game day of the 2015 season in Hammarby's 2–1 loss away against Halmstads BK.

Lidberg made another five appearances in Allsvenskan for the club during the 2016 season.

==== Loan to Enskede IK ====
On 8 April 2016 it was announced that Lidberg was going to be on loan to newly promoted Division 1 club Enskede IK for the whole season. With Enskede being Hammarby's partner club, an agreement was made that the player was allowed to represent both clubs during the loan period.

In his first start for the club, he scored two goals in Enskede's 3–1 win against Piteå IF on 1 May. Lidberg would later move on to make another 14 appearances for the side during the season, scoring 6 goals in the league play.

=== Åtvidabergs FF ===
On 30 March 2017, he signed a permanent deal with Åtvidabergs FF in Superettan, the Swedish second tier. He signed a three-year contract with his new club. Hammarby reportedly sold Lidberg after the two parties could not agree on a new contract.

Isac Lidberg made his debut for Åtvidaberg on match day one of the 2017 Superettan against IFK Värnamo on away turf. His new team lost 4–0 with Lidberg getting sent off in the last few minutes of the game, after coming on as a substitute.

=== Start ===
On 11 January 2018, Lidberg signed a three-year contract with Norwegian Eliteserien club Start. On 4 March, he moved to Jerv on loan, on a deal until 1 August. On 8 April, he made his debut for Jerv, coming on as a substitute for Aram Khalili in the 1–1 home draw against Ull/Kisa. On 17 June, he scored his first goal, in a 3–2 defeat to Florø.

Initially returning to Start, on 15 August 2018 he moved – again on loan – to HamKam. On 19 August, he made his debut for the club in a 1–0 defeat to Nest-Sotra.

In February 2019, Lidberg was loaned out to IF Brommapojkarna on a loan agreement for the 2019 season.

=== Gefle IF ===
In February 2020, Lidberg signed a two-year contract with Gefle IF competing in the Swedish third tier, Ettan. In the third division, he had a successful spell, making 25 appearances in which he scored 19 goals in his first season at the club.

=== Go Ahead Eagles ===
On 1 May 2021, Lidberg signed a two-year contract with an option of an additional year with newly promoted Dutch Eredivisie club Go Ahead Eagles. He made his debut in the Eredivisie on 13 August 2021 in a 1–0 loss to Heerenveen.

=== Utrecht ===
On 18 July 2023, Lidberg signed a four-year contract with Utrecht. He made his debut for the club on 20 August, replacing Victor Jensen in the 79th minute of a 2–0 league loss to Heerenveen. He scored his debut goal for Utrecht from a penalty kick on 31 October, contributing to a 3–0 lead in their 3–2 triumph against RKC Waalwijk in the KNVB Cup. On 26 November, he netted his first league goal for Utrecht, securing the winning goal as the Domstedelingen triumphed 2–1 against Sparta Rotterdam at Het Kasteel. Following a mild achilles injury, he was substituted early during a draw against AZ on 3 December due to a knock. This sidelined him for the remainder of the year.

=== Darmstadt ===
On 16 August 2024, Lidberg signed with Darmstadt 98 in German 2. Bundesliga.

=== Borussia Mönchengladbach ===
On 9 June 2026, Lidberg signed a four-year contract with Borussia Mönchengladbach.

== International career ==
Isac Lidberg played 14 games for Sweden U17, in which he scored nine goals, between 2014 and 2015.

As of the end of 2016, he has won 11 caps for Sweden U19 and scored 10 goals in total.

Lidberg made his debut for Sweden national team on 19 November 2024 in a Nations League game against Azerbaijan at the Strawberry Arena. He substituted Viktor Gyökeres (who scored 4 goals) in the 89th minute, as Sweden won 6–0.

== Style of play ==
Lidberg has described himself as a "powerful forward that can score on anything", which is something then manager Nanne Bergstrand agreed upon, stating that he's strong for his age due to training from an early age. Hammarby's former sporting director Mats Jingblad added that Lidberg is a modern forward that often make runs behind the defenders.

== Personal life ==
Lidberg grew up mainly in Stockholm and is the second born child to Swedish reality television star and wrestling world champion Martin Lidberg. His uncle is Jimmy Lidberg, a fellow Olympic medalist wrestler. He practiced wrestling as well for several years and was a big talent, but quit to focus on his football instead. Lidberg dreams of playing for Bayern Munich one day and his idol footballer is the German striker Mario Gomez.

== Career statistics ==
=== Club ===
As of match played 31 October 2026

Appearances and goals by club, season and competition
Club	Season	League			Cup		Europe		Other		Total	
Club	Season	Division	Apps	Goals	Apps	Goals	Apps	Goals	Apps	Goals	Apps	Goals
Hammarby IF	2015	Allsvenskan	2	0	0	0	—		—		2	0
Hammarby IF	2016	Allsvenskan	5	0	0	0	—		—		5	0
Hammarby IF	Total		7	0	0	0	0	0	0	0	7	0
Enskede IK (on loan)	2016	Ettan	14	6	0	0	—		—		14	6
Åtvidabergs FF	2017	Superettan	22	5	0	0	—		—		22	5
Start	2018	Eliteserien	0	0	0	0	—		—		0	0
Jerv (loan)	2018	OBOS-ligaen	11	0	1	0	—		—		12	0
HamKam (loan)	2018	OBOS-ligaen	5	0	0	0	—		—		5	0
Brommapojkarna (loan)	2019	Superettan	18	3	0	0	—		—		18	3
Gefle	2020	Ettan	25	19	0	0	—		—		25	19
Gefle	2021	Ettan	12	3	0	0	—		—		12	3
Gefle	Total		37	22	0	0	0	0	0	0	37	22
Go Ahead Eagles	2021–22	Eredivisie	32	4	4	2	—		—		36	6
Go Ahead Eagles	2022–23	Eredivisie	33	7	3	1	—		—		36	8
Go Ahead Eagles	Total		65	11	7	3	0	0	0	0	72	14
Utrecht	2023–24	Eredivisie	20	4	1	1	—		1	0	22	5
Darmstadt 98	2024–25	2. Bundesliga	28	14	3	1	—		—		31	15
Darmstadt 98	2025–26	2. Bundesliga	30	17	3	0	—		—		33	17
Darmstadt 98	Total		58	31	6	1	0	0	0	0	64	32
Borussia Mönchengladbach	2026–27	Bundesliga	7	1	1	0	—		—		8	1
Career total			264	83	16	5	0	0	1	0	281	88

=== International ===
As of match played 18 November 2025

Appearances and goals by national team and year
National team	Year	Apps	Goals
Sweden	2024	1	0
Sweden	2025	2	0
Total		3	0
