= 2024–25 PEC Zwolle season =

PEC Zwolle
2024–25 season
- Manager: Johnny Jansen
- Eredivisie: 10th
- KNVB Cup: First round
- Top goalscorer: League: Dylan Vente (13); All: Dylan Vente (13)
- Average home league attendance: 13,615
- Biggest win: PEC Zwolle 3–0 Heracles Almelo
- Biggest defeat: PSV 6–0 PEC Zwolle
Home colours

The 2024–25 season was the 115th season in the history of PEC Zwolle and the second consecutive season in the Eredivisie. The club also competed in the KNVB Cup, exiting the tournament in the first round.

== Transfers ==
=== In ===
Pos.	Player	Transferred from	Fee	Date	Source
DF	(Netherlands) Olivier Aertssen	(Netherlands) Jong Ajax	€150,000	26 August 2024	
MF	(Cape Verde) Jamiro Monteiro	Unattached	Free	30 August 2024	
MF	(Denmark) Younes Namli		Free	9 September 2024	

=== Out ===
Pos.	Player	Transferred to	Fee	Date	Source
MF	(United States) Anthony Fontana		Contract terminated	2 January 2025	

== Competitions ==
=== Overall record ===
Competition	First match	Last match	Starting round	Record							
Competition	First match	Last match	Starting round	Pld	W	D	L	GF	GA	GD	Win %
Eredivisie	11 August 2024		Matchday 1	17	4	5	8	16	26	−10	23.53
KNVB Cup	29 October 2024		First round	1	0	0	1	3	4	−1	0.00
Total				18	4	5	9	19	30	−11	22.22

Last updated: 20 December 2024
Source: Competitions

=== Eredivisie ===
==== League table ====
Pos	Team	Pld	W	D	L	GF	GA	GD	Pts	Qualification or relegation
8	NEC	34	12	7	15	51	46	+5	43	Qualification for the European competition play-offs
9	Heerenveen	34	12	7	15	42	57	−15	43	Qualification for the European competition play-offs
10	PEC Zwolle	34	10	11	13	43	51	−8	41	
11	Fortuna Sittard	34	11	8	15	37	54	−17	41	
12	Sparta Rotterdam	34	9	12	13	39	43	−4	39	

Source: Eredivisie
Rules for classification: 1) Points; 2) Goal difference; 3) Goals scored; 4) Head-to-head points; 5) Head-to-head goal difference; 6) Head-to-head away goals scored; 7) Play-off if relevant for deciding champion, relegation or participating in a European league, otherwise by draw. 8) Penalty shoot-out (only after a play-off)

==== Results summary ====
Overall								Home						Away					
Pld	W	D	L	GF	GA	GD	Pts	W	D	L	GF	GA	GD	W	D	L	GF	GA	GD
0	0	0	0	0	0	0	0	0	0	0	0	0	0	0	0	0	0	0	0

Last updated: 20 December 2024.

==== Results by round ====
Round	1
Ground	
Result	
Position	

Updated to match(es) played on 20 December 2024. Source:
A = Away; H = Home; W = Win; D = Draw; L = Loss

==== Matches ====
11 August 2024 1	FC Utrecht	1–0	PEC Zwolle	Utrecht

18 August 2024 2	PEC Zwolle	1–5	Feyenoord	Zwolle
				Stadium: MAC³PARK Stadion

24 August 2024 3	NEC	1–0	PEC Zwolle	Nijmegen

1 September 2024 4	PEC Zwolle	3–0	Heracles Almelo	Zwolle
				Stadium: MAC³PARK Stadion

14 September 2024 5	FC Twente	1–1	PEC Zwolle	Enschede

20 September 2024 6	PEC Zwolle	1–2	AZ	Zwolle
				Stadium: MAC³PARK Stadion

29 September 2024 7	PEC Zwolle	1–0	Almere City	Zwolle
				Stadium: MAC³PARK Stadion

6 October 2024 8	sc Heerenveen	1–1	PEC Zwolle	Heerenveen
				Stadium: Abe Lenstra Stadion

20 October 2024 9	PEC Zwolle	1–2	NAC Breda	Zwolle
				Stadium: MAC³PARK Stadion

26 October 2024 10	PSV	6–0	PEC Zwolle	Eindhoven

3 November 2024 11	Go Ahead Eagles	2–2	PEC Zwolle	Deventer
				Stadium: De Adelaarshorst

9 November 2024 12	PEC Zwolle	3–1	Fortuna Sittard	Zwolle
				Stadium: MAC³PARK Stadion

24 November 2024 13	Ajax	2–0	PEC Zwolle	Amsterdam
				Stadium: Johan Cruyff Arena

30 November 2024 14	PEC Zwolle	1–0	Sparta Rotterdam	Zwolle
	Monteiro 57'			Stadium: MAC³PARK Stadion

8 December 2024 15	Groningen	0–0	PEC Zwolle	Groningen
				Stadium: Euroborg

13 December 2024 16	PEC Zwolle	0–1	Willem II	Zwolle
			Meerveld 11'	Stadium: MAC³PARK Stadion

20 December 2024 17	RKC Waalwijk	1–1	PEC Zwolle	Waalwijk
20:00	Zawada 10'		Vente 41' (pen.)	Stadium: Mandemakers Stadion

11 January 2025 18	PEC Zwolle	v	NEC	Zwolle
20:00				Stadium: MAC³PARK Stadion

=== KNVB Cup ===
29 October 2024 First round	NEC	4–3 (a.e.t.)	PEC Zwolle	Nijmegen
				Stadium: Goffertstadion
