= 2021–22 Jong FC Utrecht season =

Jong FC Utrecht
2021–22 season
- Owner: Frans van Seumeren Holding B.V. (99%); Stichting Beheer Aandelen FC Utrecht (1%)
- Chairman: Pieter Leyssius
- Head coach: Darije Kalezic
- Stadium: Sportcomplex Zoudenbalch; Stadion Galgenwaard
- Eerste Divisie: 18th
- Top goalscorer: League: Nick Venema (Note: Sold, loaned out or contract terminated during the season.) (8); All: Nick Venema (8)
- Highest home attendance: 583 (vs. NAC Breda, 4 April 2022)
- Lowest home attendance: 0 (vs. FC Volendam, 22 November 2021) (vs. ADO Den Haag, 6 December 2021) (vs. De Graafschap, 20 December 2021) (vs. Jong Ajax, 10 January 2022) (vs. FC Dordrecht, 21 January 2022)
- Average home league attendance: 336
- Biggest win: 3–0, 0–3 (vs. SC Telstar, 27 August 2021) (vs. Helmond Sport, 17 September 2021)
- Biggest defeat: 0–6 (vs. FC Eindhoven, 5 November 2021)
Home colours	Away colours	Third colours

The 2021–22 season was the 6th season of Jong FC Utrecht at the second level of Dutch football. Before that, they played in the Beloften Eredivisie.

== Players ==
=== U23-team squad ===
As of 30 April 2022

Note: Flags indicate national team as defined under FIFA eligibility rules; some limited exceptions apply. Players may hold more than one non-FIFA nationality.

No.	Pos.	Nation	Player
—	GK	NED	Kevin Gadellaa
—	GK	NED	Sep van der Heijden
—	GK	NED	Joey Houweling
—	GK	NED	Fabian de Keijzer
—	GK	NED	Thijmen Nijhuis
—	GK	GER	Eric Oelschlägel
—	GK	NED	Jord Ruijgrok
—	DF	NED	Reda Akmum
—	DF	NED	Gabriël Culhaci
—	DF	NED	Julliani Eersteling
—	DF	NED	Deveron Fonville
—	DF	NED	Kjeld van den Hoek
—	DF	NED	Ruben Kluivert
—	DF	NED	Wessel Kooy
—	DF	NED	Djevencio van der Kust
—	DF	NED	Christopher Mamengi
—	DF	NED	Rick Meissen
—	DF	NED	Sylian Mokono
—	DF	NED	Joshua Mukeh
—	DF	NED	Tommy St. Jago
—	DF	NED	Dylan Timber
—	DF	FRA	Arthur Zagre
—	MF	NED	Oussama Alou
—	MF	NED	Rafik El Arguioui
—	MF	NED	~~Rayan El Azrak~~
—	MF	NED	Rida El Barjiji

No.	Pos.	Nation	Player
—	MF	NED	~~Davy van den Berg~~
—	MF	NED	Imanuel Bonsu
—	MF	BEL	Othmane Boussaid
—	MF	NED	Raymond Huizing
—	MF	JPN	Yuya Ikeshita
—	MF	NED	Ivar Jenner
—	MF	FRA	Albert Lottin
—	MF	EST	Rocco Robert Shein
—	FW	MAR	Mohamed Akharaz
—	FW	SWE	Pontus Almqvist
—	FW	NED	Remco Balk
—	FW	CUW	Juruël Bernadina
—	FW	NED	~~Djenairo Daniels~~
—	FW	IDN	Bagus Kahfi
—	FW	NED	Eros Maddy
—	FW	NED	Mohamed Mallahi
—	FW	NED	Aurelio Oehlers
—	FW	NED	Mees Rijks
—	FW	NED	Danilio Ruperti
—	FW	NED	Derensili Sanches Fernandes
—	FW	NED	Ayman Sellouf
—	FW	FRA	Moussa Sylla
—	FW	NED	~~Yassine Tekfaoui~~
—	FW	NED	Elijah Velland
—	FW	NED	~~Nick Venema~~

== Transfers ==
=== Summer ===
==== Transfers in 2021/22 ====
Nat.	Pos.	Player	Transferred from	Particularities
(Netherlands) NED	DF	Julliani Eersteling	(Netherlands) Go Ahead Eagles	
(Netherlands) NED	FW	Danilio Ruperti	(Netherlands) FC Twente/Heracles Academy	
(Netherlands) NED	FW	Ayman Sellouf	(Netherlands) N.E.C. Nijmegen	
(Netherlands) NED	DF	Dylan Timber	(Netherlands) Sparta Nijkerk	
(Netherlands) NED	FW	Nick Venema	(Netherlands) FC Utrecht	
(Netherlands) NED	GK	Kevin Gadellaa	(Netherlands) FC Utrecht O18	
(Netherlands) NED	MF	Oussama Alou	(Netherlands) FC Utrecht O18	
(Curaçao) CUW	FW	Juruël Bernadina	(Netherlands) FC Utrecht O18	
(Netherlands) NED	MF	Imanuel Bonsu	(Netherlands) FC Utrecht O18	
(Netherlands) NED	DF	Kjeld van den Hoek	(Netherlands) FC Utrecht O18	
(Netherlands) NED	MF	Yuya Ikeshita	(Netherlands) FC Utrecht O18	
(Indonesia) IDN	FW	Bagus Kahfi	(Netherlands) FC Utrecht O18	
(Netherlands) NED	DF	Rick Meissen	(Netherlands) FC Utrecht O18	
(Netherlands) NED	DF	Joshua Mukeh	(Netherlands) FC Utrecht O18	
(Netherlands) NED	FW	Aurelio Oehlers	(Netherlands) FC Utrecht O18	
(Netherlands) NED	FW	Mees Rijks	(Netherlands) FC Utrecht O18	
(Netherlands) NED	FW	Elijah Velland	(Netherlands) FC Utrecht O18	

==== Transfers out 2021/22 ====
Nat.	Pos.	Player	Transferred to	Particularities
(Netherlands) NED	DF	Niciano Grootfaam	(Netherlands) Almere City U21	
(Netherlands) NED	FW	Jeredy Hilterman	(Netherlands) FC Emmen	
(Netherlands) NED	DF	Mark Pabai	(Netherlands) PEC Zwolle	
(Netherlands) NED	MF	Davy van den Berg	(Netherlands) FC Utrecht	
(Netherlands) NED	DF	Christopher Mamengi	(Netherlands) FC Utrecht	
(Netherlands) NED	DF	Sylian Mokono	(Netherlands) FC Utrecht	
(Netherlands) NED	FW	Yassine Tekfaoui	(Netherlands) IJsselmeervogels	Contract terminated
(Netherlands) NED	FW	Tim Pieters	(Netherlands) USV Hercules	Chosen for study
(Netherlands) NED	FW	Djenairo Daniels	(Italy) US Sassuolo	On loan (+option to buy)
(Netherlands) NED	DF	Denso Kasius	(Netherlands) FC Volendam	On loan
(Belgium) BEL	DF	Héritier Deyonge	(France) Olympique Lyon	Back from loan
(Netherlands) NED	FW	Yassin Nasser	(North Macedonia) FK Skopje	End of contract
(Netherlands) NED	MF	Giovanni de la Vega	(Netherlands) OFC	End of contract

=== Winter ===
==== Transfers in 2021/22 ====
Nat.	Pos.	Player	Transferred from	Particularities
(Netherlands) NED	GK	Thijmen Nijhuis	(Netherlands) FC Utrecht	
(Estonia) EST	MF	Rocco Robert Shein	(Estonia) FC Flora	On loan (+option to buy, if lifted contract till 2025)
(Netherlands) NED	FW	Djenairo Daniels	(Italy) US Sassuolo	Back from loan
(Netherlands) NED	DF	Denso Kasius	(Netherlands) FC Volendam	Back from loan

==== Transfers out 2021/22 ====
Nat.	Pos.	Player	Transferred to	Particularities
(Netherlands) NED	DF	Denso Kasius	(Italy) Bologna FC	
(Netherlands) NED	FW	Djenairo Daniels	(Canada) Pacific FC	Contract terminated
(Netherlands) NED	MF	Rayan El Azrak	(Netherlands) VVV-Venlo	On loan
(Netherlands) NED	FW	Nick Venema	(Netherlands) VVV-Venlo	On loan

== Pre-season and friendlies ==
Win Draw Loss Fixtures

26 June 2021 Friendly	Jong FC Utrecht (Netherlands)	1–1	(Netherlands) Jong AZ	Utrecht, Netherlands
14:00 CEST (UTC+2)	Kluivert (yellow card); Omgba 79'	Report	Van Aken (yellow card); Gemmel (yellow card) , (goal) 77'	Stadium: Sportcomplex Zoudenbalch; Attendance: 0
Note: Behind closed doors.

3 July 2021 Friendly	sc Heerenveen (Netherlands)	3–1	(Netherlands) Jong FC Utrecht	Langezwaag, Netherlands
14:00 CEST (UTC+2)	J. Veerman 8'; Van der Heide 66'; Nygren 78'	Report	Hilterman 55'	Stadium: Sportpark 't Paradyske; Attendance: Unknown

9 July 2021 Friendly	Jong FC Utrecht (Netherlands)	3–0	(Netherlands) Almere City FC	Utrecht, Netherlands
16:00 CEST (UTC+2)	Mallahi 50'; Alou 58'; Sellouf 76'	Report		Stadium: Sportcomplex Zoudenbalch; Attendance: 0
Note: Behind closed doors.

16 July 2021 Friendly	SV TEC (Netherlands)	3–0	(Netherlands) Jong FC Utrecht	Tiel, Netherlands
19:30 CEST (UTC+2)	Sterling 3', 11'; Ebobo 45'	Report		Stadium: Sportpark De Lok; Attendance: 0
Note: Behind closed doors and the match was played in two periods of 35 minutes each.

17 July 2021 Friendly	Jong FC Utrecht (Netherlands)	2–1	(France) Lille OSC B	Utrecht, Netherlands
	Agouzoul (o.g.); Huizing	Report	Diedhiou	Stadium: Sportcomplex Zoudenbalch; Attendance: 0
Note: Behind closed doors.

24 July 2021 Friendly	Jong FC Utrecht (Netherlands)	2–2	(Netherlands) Excelsior	Utrecht, Netherlands
13:00 CEST (UTC+2)	Sanches Fernandes 47'; El Yaakoubi 84' (o.g.)	Report	Ormonde-Ottewill 73'; Gouda 82'	Stadium: Sportcomplex Zoudenbalch; Attendance: 0
Note: Behind closed doors.

29 July 2021 Friendly	Jong FC Utrecht (Netherlands)	1–3	(Netherlands) TOP Oss	Zeist, Netherlands
16:45 CEST (UTC+2)	Huizing	Report	Noslin; Tejan; Margaritha	Stadium: KNVB Campus; Attendance: 0
Note: Behind closed doors.

3 August 2021 Friendly	Jong FC Utrecht (Netherlands)	4–1	(Netherlands) Jong sc Heerenveen	Utrecht, Netherlands
13:00 CEST (UTC+2)	Venema 2'; Meissen 14'; Velland 76'; Mallahi 78'	Report	Talan 78'	Stadium: Sportcomplex Zoudenbalch; Attendance: 0
Note: Behind closed doors.

3 September 2021 Friendly	Jong FC Utrecht (Netherlands)	5–2	(Belgium) La Louvière Centre	Utrecht, Netherlands
15:00 CEST (UTC+2)	Kahfi (pen.); Kahfi; Rijks; Rijks; Bernadina	Report	Bentayeb; Ba (pen.)	Stadium: Sportcomplex Zoudenbalch; Attendance: 0
Note: Behind closed doors.

6 October 2021 Friendly	SC Cambuur (Netherlands)	3–1	(Netherlands) Jong FC Utrecht	Leeuwarden, Netherlands
14:00 CEST (UTC+2)	Doodeman 28', 37'; Paulissen 74'	Report	Mukeh 76'	Stadium: Cambuur Stadion; Attendance: 0
Note: Behind closed doors.

27 January 2022 Friendly	Jong FC Utrecht (Netherlands)	1–2	(Netherlands) Jong FC Volendam	Utrecht, Netherlands
	Sanches Fernandes	Report	Kaars; Wouter	Stadium: Sportcomplex Zoudenbalch; Attendance: 0
Note: Behind closed doors.

23 March 2022 Friendly	Jong FC Utrecht (Netherlands)	1–0	Australia U23	Utrecht, Netherlands
13:00 CET (UTC+1)	Huizing 49'	Report		Stadium: Sportcomplex Zoudenbalch
Note: Match of 3 times 30 minutes

== Competition ==
=== Overall record ===
Competition	First match	Last match	Starting round	Final position	Record							
Competition	First match	Last match	Starting round	Final position	Pld	W	D	L	GF	GA	GD	Win %
Eerste Divisie	9 August 2021	6 May 2022	Matchday 1	18th	38	11	5	22	43	67	−24	28.95
Total					38	11	5	22	43	67	−24	28.95

Last updated: 11 May 2022
Source: Soccerway

=== Eerste Divisie ===
==== League table ====
Pos	Team	Pld	W	D	L	GF	GA	GD	Pts	Promotion or qualification
16	MVV Maastricht	38	12	4	22	43	75	−32	40	
17	FC Dordrecht	38	10	9	19	53	77	−24	39	
18	Jong FC Utrecht	38	11	5	22	43	67	−24	38	Reserve teams are not eligible to be promoted to the Eredivisie
19	Telstar	38	8	11	19	47	74	−27	35	
20	Helmond Sport	38	8	7	23	39	72	−33	28 (Note: Helmond Sport were deducted a total of three points for failing to participate in the FC Emmen – Helmond Sport match, which was set on 14 January 2022.)	

Updated to match(es) played on 6 May 2022. Source: Soccerway, Keuken Kampioen Divisie (in Dutch)
Rules for classification: Season in progress: 1) Most points won; 2) Less points lost; 3) Goal difference; 4) Goals scored; 5) Alphabetical order; End of season: 1) Points; 2) Goal difference; 3) Goals scored; 4) Head-to-head points; 5) Head-to-head goal difference; 6) Head-to-head away goals scored; 7) Play-off if relevant for deciding champion, relegation or participating in a European league, otherwise by draw. 8) Penalty shoot-out (only after a play-off)

===== Period 1 =====
Pos	Team	Pld	W	D	L	GF	GA	GD	Pts	Qualification
5	Excelsior	9	5	1	3	18	12	+6	16	
6	De Graafschap	9	5	1	3	16	12	+4	16	
7	Jong FC Utrecht	9	4	3	2	14	8	+6	15	Reserves teams cannot participate in the promotion play-offs
8	Roda JC Kerkrade	9	4	2	3	17	13	+4	14	
9	VVV-Venlo	9	4	1	4	11	11	0	13	

Source: Keuken Kampioen Divisie (in Dutch)
Rules for classification: 1) points; 2) goal difference; 3) number of goals scored

===== Period 2 =====
Pos	Team	Pld	W	D	L	GF	GA	GD	Pts	Qualification
15	Almere City FC	10	2	2	6	14	22	−8	8	
16	Telstar	10	1	4	5	12	25	−13	7	
17	Jong FC Utrecht	10	2	1	7	10	23	−13	7	Reserves teams cannot participate in the promotion play-offs
18	TOP Oss	10	0	5	5	9	15	−6	5	
19	FC Dordrecht	10	1	1	8	13	32	−19	4	

Source: Keuken Kampioen Divisie (in Dutch)
Rules for classification: 1) points; 2) goal difference; 3) number of goals scored

===== Period 3 =====
Pos	Team	Pld	W	D	L	GF	GA	GD	Pts	Qualification
15	Jong AZ	9	2	1	6	11	17	−6	7	Reserves teams cannot participate in the promotion play-offs
16	Almere City FC	9	1	3	5	8	17	−9	6	
17	Jong FC Utrecht	9	2	0	7	6	21	−15	6	Reserves teams cannot participate in the promotion play-offs
18	FC Den Bosch	9	1	2	6	8	16	−8	5	
19	MVV Maastricht	9	1	0	8	7	19	−12	3	

Source: Keuken Kampioen Divisie (in Dutch)
Rules for classification: 1) points; 2) goal difference; 3) number of goals scored

===== Period 4 =====
Pos	Team	Pld	W	D	L	GF	GA	GD	Pts	Qualification
13	TOP Oss	10	3	2	5	13	18	−5	11	
14	FC Dordrecht	10	3	2	5	12	18	−6	11	
15	Jong FC Utrecht	10	3	1	6	13	15	−2	10	Reserves teams cannot participate in the promotion play-offs
16	De Graafschap	10	2	4	4	12	14	−2	10	
17	Jong PSV	10	1	6	3	15	19	−4	9	Reserves teams cannot participate in the promotion play-offs

Source: Keuken Kampioen Divisie (in Dutch)
Rules for classification: 1) points; 2) goal difference; 3) number of goals scored

==== Results summary ====
Overall								Home						Away					
Pld	W	D	L	GF	GA	GD	Pts	W	D	L	GF	GA	GD	W	D	L	GF	GA	GD
38	11	5	22	43	67	−24	38	5	0	14	16	35	−19	6	5	8	27	32	−5

Last updated: 11 May 2022.
Source: Eerste divisie

==== Results by round ====
Round	1	2	3	4	5	6	7	8	9	10	11	12	13	14	15	16	17	18	19	20	21	22	23	24	25	26	27	28	29	30	31	32	33	34	35	36	37	38
Ground	H	A	A	H	H	A	A	A	H	H	A	H	A	H	H	A	A	H	A	H	H	A	H	H	A	A	H	A	H	A	H	H	A	A	H	A	A	H
Result	L	D	D	W	W	W	W	D	L	L	L	W	L	L	L	D	L	L	W	L	L	L	L	W	L	W	L	L	L	L	L	W	L	W	L	D	W	L
Position	15	14	15	10	6	3	2	3	6	10	11	8	10	14	14	14	15	15	14	15	15	16	16	16	16	12	13	14	15	17	19	18	19	17	17	18	16	18

Updated to match(es) played on 11 May 2022. Source: Eerste divisie
A = Away; H = Home; W = Win; D = Draw; L = Loss

==== Matches ====
The league fixtures were announced on 11 June 2021.

9 August 2021 1	Jong FC Utrecht	0–1	MVV Maastricht	Utrecht
20:00 CEST (UTC+2)		Report	Dzepar 37'; Waem (yellow card) 90+2'; Mami (yellow card) 90+4'	Stadium: Stadion Galgenwaard; Attendance: 541; Referee: Erwin Blank

13 August 2021 2	Almere City FC	1–1	Jong FC Utrecht	Almere
20:00 CEST (UTC+2)	Alhaft 15'	Report	Meissen (yellow card) 19'; Sellouf (yellow card) 47'; Culhaci (yellow card) 65'; Rijks 89'; Venema (yellow card) 90+5'	Stadium: Yanmar Stadion; Attendance: 1,786; Referee: Robin Gansner

20 August 2021 3	FC Dordrecht	2–2	Jong FC Utrecht	Dordrecht
20:00 CEST (UTC+2)	Meijer 24'; N'Diaye 32'; Miceli (yellow card) 45+1'	Report	Venema 28', 50'; Mukeh (yellow card) 55' (yellow-red card) 90+4'	Stadium: Riwal Hoogwerkers Stadion; Attendance: 1,158; Referee: Nick Smit

27 August 2021 4	Jong FC Utrecht	3–0	SC Telstar	Utrecht
20:00 CEST (UTC+2)	Mallahi 29'; Kluivert 40'; Huizing (yellow card) 47'; Venema 54', (yellow card) 66'; Ikeshita (yellow card) 76'	Report	Liesdek (yellow card) 39'	Stadium: Sportcomplex Zoudenbalch; Attendance: 294; Referee: Robin Hensgens

10 September 2021 6	Jong AZ	0–1	Jong FC Utrecht	Wijdewormer
20:00 CEST (UTC+2)	Franken (yellow card) 38'	Report	Huizing (yellow card) 25'; Lottin (yellow card) 37'; Venema 57'; Van der Kust (yellow card) 81'; Maddy (yellow card) 90+6'	Stadium: AFAS Trainingscomplex; Attendance: 270; Referee: Sam Dröge

13 September 2021 5	Jong FC Utrecht	2–1	Jong PSV	Utrecht
20:00 CEST (UTC+2)	Venema 14'; Van den Hoek (yellow card) 36'; Van den Berg 52'	Report	Touré 37' (pen.); Vos (yellow card) 82'	Stadium: Sportcomplex Zoudenbalch; Attendance: 294; Referee: Luca Cantineau

17 September 2021 7	Helmond Sport	0–3	Jong FC Utrecht	Helmond
20:00 CEST (UTC+2)		Report	Mokono 44'; El Azrak 50'; Van der Kust 90+1'; Ikeshita (yellow card) 90+3'	Stadium: SolarUnie Stadion; Attendance: 1,687; Referee: Robin Gansner

24 September 2021 8	De Graafschap	2–2	Jong FC Utrecht	Doetinchem
20:00 CEST (UTC+2)	Dekker 39', (yellow card) 74'; Brittijn 90+5'	Report	Van den Berg (yellow card) 25'; Fortes 51' (o.g.); Sanches Fernandes 87'; Van der Kust (yellow card) 90+1'	Stadium: De Vijverberg; Attendance: 7,698; Referee: Jannick van der Laan

1 October 2021 9	Jong FC Utrecht	0–1	FC Emmen	Utrecht
20:00 CEST (UTC+2)		Report	Toufiqui (yellow card) 14'; Araujo 43'; El Azzouzi (yellow card) 72'	Stadium: Sportcomplex Zoudenbalch; Attendance: 391; Referee: Jesse Rozendal

15 October 2021 11	Jong Ajax	3–1	Jong FC Utrecht	Duivendrecht
20:00 CEST (UTC+2)	Ünüvar 25', 77', (yellow card) 34'; Warmerdam (yellow card) 66'; Llansana (yellow card) 71'; Douglas (yellow card) 82', (goal) 88'	Report	Balk 12'	Stadium: De Toekomst; Attendance: 592; Referee: Martijn Vos

18 October 2021 10	Jong FC Utrecht	1–2	Roda JC Kerkrade	Utrecht
20:00 CEST (UTC+2)	Zagre 59'; Eersteling (yellow card) 71'; Ikeshita (yellow card) 89'; Mallahi (yellow card) 90+1'	Report	Pflücke 4'; Emmers 20'; Marzo (yellow card) 56'; De Boer (yellow card) 75'; Vossebelt (yellow card) 88'	Stadium: Sportcomplex Zoudenbalch; Attendance: 396; Referee: Luca Cantineau

22 October 2021 12	Jong FC Utrecht	2–1	TOP Oss	Utrecht
20:00 CEST (UTC+2)	El Azrak 21'; Venema 85'	Report	Mathieu (penalty missed) 64'; Tejan 64'; Dogan (yellow card) 80'; Kaak (yellow card) 84'	Stadium: Sportcomplex Zoudenbalch; Attendance: 194; Referee: Robin Hensgens

29 October 2021 13	FC Den Bosch	2–1	Jong FC Utrecht	's-Hertogenbosch
20:00 CEST (UTC+2)	Kuijpers 19'; Van der Winden (yellow card) 32'; Berte 45+1'; Felida (yellow card) 90+3'	Report	Sellouf 77'	Stadium: Stadion De Vliert; Attendance: 2,700; Referee: Marc Nagtegaal

5 November 2021 14	Jong FC Utrecht	0–6	FC Eindhoven	Utrecht
20:00 CET (UTC+1)	Venema (yellow card) 16'	Report	Amevor 8'; Van der Sande 15', 30'; De Keersmaecker 24'; Dahlhaus 65'; Vermeulen 84'	Stadium: Sportcomplex Zoudenbalch; Attendance: 325; Referee: Jesse Rozendal

19 November 2021 16	NAC Breda	1–1	Jong FC Utrecht	Breda
20:00 CET (UTC+1)	Eersteling 46' (o.g.)	Report	Huizing 57'	Stadium: Rat Verlegh Stadion; Attendance: 0 Referee: Rob Dieperink

22 November 2021 15	Jong FC Utrecht	0–1	FC Volendam	Utrecht
20:00 CET (UTC+1)	Ikeshita (yellow card) 67'	Report	Douiri 82'	Stadium: Sportcomplex Zoudenbalch; Attendance: 0 Referee: Joey Kooij

26 November 2021 17	Excelsior	2–1	Jong FC Utrecht	Rotterdam
20:00 CET (UTC+1)	Dallinga 48'; Azarkan 81'	Report	Maddy 19', (yellow card) 28'	Stadium: Van Donge & De Roo Stadion; Attendance: 0 Referee: Martin Pérez

6 December 2021 18	Jong FC Utrecht	1–4	ADO Den Haag	Utrecht
20:00 CET (UTC+1)	Maddy (yellow card) 56'; Mallahi 79'	Report	Culhaci 7' (o.g.); Ikeshita 15' (o.g.); Steijn (yellow card) 35'; Verheydt 51'; Catic 77'	Stadium: Stadion Galgenwaard; Attendance: 0 Referee: Clay Ruperti

10 December 2021 19	VVV-Venlo	1–2	Jong FC Utrecht	Venlo
20:00 CET (UTC+1)	Braken 24' (pen.); Koglin (yellow card) 90+2'	Report	Culhaci (yellow card) 24'; Venema 76', 87'	Stadium: Covebo Stadion - De Koel; Attendance: 0 Referee: Michael Eijgelsheim

20 December 2021 20	Jong FC Utrecht	0–2	De Graafschap	Utrecht
20:00 CET (UTC+1)	Ikeshita (yellow card) 39'	Report	Korte 34'; Gravenberch (yellow card) 78', (goal) 89'; Acheffay (yellow card) 84'	Stadium: Sportcomplex Zoudenbalch; Attendance: 0 Referee: Luca Cantineau

10 January 2022 21	Jong FC Utrecht	0–2	Jong Ajax	Utrecht
20:00 CET (UTC+1)	Musampa (yellow card) 9'; Regeer 16'; Van der Sloot (yellow card) 81'; Rasmussen 90+1'	Report	Bonsu (yellow card) 10'; Huizing (yellow card) 42'	Stadium: Sportcomplex Zoudenbalch; Attendance: 0 Referee: Laurens Gerrets

14 January 2022 22	FC Eindhoven	4–0	Jong FC Utrecht	Eindhoven
20:00 CET (UTC+1)	Seedorf (yellow card) 18'; Vermeulen (yellow card) 30'; Van der Sande 50'; Brym 67', 74'; Dahlhaus (yellow card) 85'; Sleegers 90'	Report	Van den Hoek (yellow card) 39'; Akharaz (yellow card) 73'	Stadium: Jan Louwers Stadion; Attendance: 0 Referee: Sam Dröge

21 January 2022 23	Jong FC Utrecht	0–4	FC Dordrecht	Utrecht
20:00 CET (UTC+1)	Van der Kust (yellow card) 49'; Mukeh (yellow card) 52'; Jenner (yellow card) 58'	Report	Van Huizen 5'; Meijer 14'; Zehir 37'; Suray (yellow card) 44'; Conteh 90+2'	Stadium: Sportcomplex Zoudenbalch; Attendance: 0 Referee: Robin Gansner

4 February 2022 25	FC Volendam	2–0	Jong FC Utrecht	Volendam
20:00 CET (UTC+1)	Oristanio 12'; B. Ould-Chikh 35', (yellow card) 60'	Report		Stadium: Kras Stadion; Attendance: 1,600; Referee: Clay Ruperti

7 February 2022 24	Jong FC Utrecht	3–2	Helmond Sport	Utrecht
20:00 CET (UTC+1)	Rijks 21'; Shein 50'; Sellouf 87' (pen.)	Report	Beekman 26'; Goselink 72'	Stadium: Sportcomplex Zoudenbalch; Attendance: 140; Referee: Luuk Timmer

14 February 2022 26	Jong PSV	0–2	Jong FC Utrecht	Eindhoven
20:00 CET (UTC+1)	Markelo (yellow card) 67'	Report	Rijks 38'; Balk (yellow card) 50'; Culhaci (yellow card) 71'; Mokono 82'; Mukeh (yellow card) 84'	Stadium: PSV Campus De Herdgang; Attendance: 314; Referee: Robin Vereijken

21 February 2022 27	Jong FC Utrecht	0–1	Excelsior	Utrecht
20:00 CET (UTC+1)	Ikeshita (yellow card) 17'	Report	Niemeijer 18'	Stadium: Sportcomplex Zoudenbalch; Attendance: 263; Referee: Jesse Rozendal

25 February 2022 28	TOP Oss	4–1	Jong FC Utrecht	Oss
20:00 CET (UTC+1)	Büttner 13'; Stuy van den Herik 31'; Tejan 37'; Margaritha 39'	Report	Rijks 70'; Ikeshita (yellow card) 71'	Stadium: Frans Heesen Stadion; Attendance: 1,226; Referee: Martijn Vos

7 March 2022 29	Jong FC Utrecht	1–2	Almere City FC	Utrecht
20:00 CET (UTC+1)	St. Jago (yellow card) 43'; Ikeshita 69'; Balk (yellow card) 74'	Report	Wildeboer 5'; Leeuwin (yellow card) 27'; Pouwels 87'	Stadium: Sportcomplex Zoudenbalch; Attendance: 277; Referee: Sam Dröge

11 March 2022 30	FC Emmen	2–0	Jong FC Utrecht	Emmen
20:00 CET (UTC+1)	Mendes 19'; Assehnoun 27'; Bernadou (yellow card) 80'	Report		Stadium: De Oude Meerdijk; Attendance: 7,085; Referee: Rob Dieperink

18 March 2022 31	Jong FC Utrecht	0–1	Jong AZ	Utrecht
20:00 CET (UTC+1)		Report	Lathouwers 26'	Stadium: Sportcomplex Zoudenbalch; Attendance: 192; Referee: Nick Smit

1 April 2022 33	Roda JC Kerkrade	2–1	Jong FC Utrecht	Kerkrade
20:00 CEST (UTC+2)	Van den Berg 45+1', (yellow card) 47'; Klaasen 74'	Report	Lottin (yellow card) 18'; Shein (yellow card) 43'; Sanches Fernandes 58'	Stadium: Parkstad Limburg Stadion; Attendance: 4,523; Referee: Jannick van der Laan

4 April 2022 32	Jong FC Utrecht	1–0	NAC Breda	Utrecht
20:00 CEST (UTC+2)	Almqvist 90'	Report	Azzagari (yellow card) 40'; Hilterman (yellow card) 58'; Cagro (yellow card) 61'; De Rooij (yellow card) 76'	Stadium: Stadion Galgenwaard; Attendance: 583; Referee: Robin Hensgens

8 April 2022 34	MVV Maastricht	2–4	Jong FC Utrecht	Maastricht
20:00 CEST (UTC+2)	Ntelo 1', 23'; Blummel (yellow card) 53', (penalty missed) 81'; Dzepar (yellow card) 84'; Souren (yellow card) 90+2'	Report	Mallahi 32', (yellow card) 71'; Rijks 39'; Waem 47' (o.g.); Sanches Fernandes (yellow card) 53'; Kluivert (yellow card) 53'; Ikeshita (yellow card) 75'; Meissen (yellow card) 80'; Maddy 87'	Stadium: Stadion de Geusselt; Attendance: 3,000; Referee: Sam Dröge

18 April 2022 35	Jong FC Utrecht	0–1	FC Den Bosch	Utrecht
20:00 CEST (UTC+2)	Zagre (yellow card) 39'; Balk (yellow card) 54'	Report	Cijntje 1'; Mulders (yellow card) 39'	Stadium: Stadion Galgenwaard; Attendance: 406; Referee: Luuk Timmer

24 April 2022 36	ADO Den Haag	1–1	Jong FC Utrecht	The Hague
12:15 CEST (UTC+2)	Klas 13'; Matthys (yellow card) 47'; Rodriguez (yellow card) 89'	Report	Ikeshita (yellow card) 49'; Akharaz 90+2'; Kahfi (yellow card) 90+8'	Stadium: Cars Jeans Stadion; Attendance: 6,338; Referee: Ingmar Oostrom

29 April 2022 37	SC Telstar	1–3	Jong FC Utrecht	Velsen
12:15 CEST (UTC+2)	Fernandes 80'; Aktas (yellow card) 89'	Report	Sanches Fernandes 7'; Mallahi 84'; Alou 87'	Stadium: BUKO Stadion; Attendance: 2,278; Referee: Jesse Rozendal

6 May 2022 38	Jong FC Utrecht	2–3	VVV-Venlo	Utrecht
20:00 CEST (UTC+2)	Rijks 23'; Mallahi 51'; Timber (yellow card) 78'	Report	Venema 19'; Johansson (yellow card) 21'; El Azrak (yellow card) 30'; Van Rooijen 33', (yellow card) 64'; Braken 62'	Stadium: Sportcomplex Zoudenbalch; Attendance: 402; Referee: Laurens Gerrets

== Statistics ==
=== Goalscorers ===
Friendlies

No.	Name	Goal
1.	(Netherlands) Raymond Huizing	3
2.	(Indonesia) Bagus Kahfi	2
2.	(Netherlands) Mohamed Mallahi	2
2.	(Netherlands) Mees Rijks	2
2.	(Netherlands) Derensili Sanches Fernandes	2
6.	(Netherlands) Oussama Alou	1
6.	(Curaçao) Juruël Bernadina	1
6.	(Netherlands) Jeredy Hilterman	1
6.	(Netherlands) Rick Meissen	1
6.	(Netherlands) Joshua Mukeh	1
6.	(Netherlands) Aime Omgba	1
6.	(Netherlands) Ayman Sellouf	1
6.	(Netherlands) Elijah Velland	1
6.	(Netherlands) Nick Venema (Note: Sold, loaned out or contract terminated during the season.)	1
Own goals opponent		2
Totals		22

(Netherlands) Eerste divisie

No.	Name	Goal
1.	(Netherlands) Nick Venema (Note: Sold, loaned out or contract terminated during the season.)	8
2.	(Netherlands) Mees Rijks	6
3.	(Netherlands) Mohamed Mallahi	5
4.	(Netherlands) Derensili Sanches Fernandes	3
5.	(Netherlands) Rayan El Azrak	2
5.	(Netherlands) Eros Maddy	2
5.	(Netherlands) Sylian Mokono	2
5.	(Netherlands) Ayman Sellouf	2
9.	(Morocco) Mohamed Akharaz	1
9.	(Sweden) Pontus Almqvist	1
9.	(Netherlands) Oussama Alou	1
9.	(Netherlands) Remco Balk	1
9.	(Netherlands) Davy van den Berg	1
9.	(Netherlands) Raymond Huizing	1
9.	(Netherlands) Yuya Ikeshita	1
9.	(Netherlands) Ruben Kluivert	1
9.	(Netherlands) Djevencio van der Kust	1
9.	(Estonia) Rocco Robert Shein	1
9.	(France) Arthur Zagre	1
Own goals opponent		2
Totals		43

=== Assists ===
(Netherlands) Eerste divisie

No.	Name	
1.	(Netherlands) Remco Balk	3
1.	(Netherlands) Gabriël Culhaci	3
1.	(France) Albert Lottin	3
1.	(Netherlands) Mees Rijks	3
5.	(Netherlands) Oussama Alou	2
5.	(Netherlands) Rayan El Azrak (Note: Sold, loaned out or contract terminated during the season.)	2
5.	(Netherlands) Julliani Eersteling	2
5.	(Netherlands) Mohamed Mallahi	2
5.	(Netherlands) Joshua Mukeh	2
5.	(Estonia) Rocco Robert Shein	2
11.	(Belgium) Othmane Boussaid	1
11.	(Netherlands) Yuya Ikeshita	1
11.	(Netherlands) Djevencio van der Kust	1
11.	(Netherlands) Eros Maddy	1
11.	(Netherlands) Derensili Sanches Fernandes	1
11.	(Netherlands) Nick Venema	1
Totaal		30

== Attendance Stadion Galgenwaard ==
Round	Opponent	Attendance	Total attendance	Average
Eerste divisie
1	MVV	541	541	541
18	ADO Den Haag	0	541	541
32	NAC Breda	583	1,124	562
35	FC Den Bosch	406	1,530	510

== Attendance Sportcomplex Zoudenbalch ==
Round	Opponent	Attendance	Total attendance	Average
Friendlies
N/A	(Netherlands) Jong AZ	0	0	0
N/A	(Netherlands) Almere City FC	0	0	0
N/A	(France) Lille OSC B	0	0	0
N/A	(Netherlands) Excelsior	0	0	0
N/A	(Netherlands) Jong sc Heerenveen	0	0	0
N/A	(Belgium) La Louvière Centre	0	0	0
N/A	(Netherlands) Jong FC Volendam	0	0	0
Eerste divisie
4	SC Telstar	294	294	294
5	Jong PSV	294	588	294
9	FC Emmen	391	979	326
10	Roda JC	396	1,375	344
12	TOP Oss	194	1,569	314
14	FC Eindhoven	325	1,894	316
15	FC Volendam	0	1,894	316
20	De Graafschap	0	1,894	316
21	Jong Ajax	0	1,894	316
23	FC Dordrecht	0	1,894	316
24	Helmond Sport	140	2,034	291
27	Excelsior	263	2,297	287
29	Almere City FC	277	2,574	286
31	Jong AZ	192	2,766	277
38	VVV-Venlo	402	3,168	288
