= 2022–23 FC Eindhoven season =

FC Eindhoven
2022–23 season
- Chairman: Ronald Onink
- Manager: Rob Penders
- Stadium: Jan Louwers Stadion
- Eerste Divisie: 8th
- KNVB Cup: Second round
- Top goalscorer: League: Charles-Andreas Brym (11); All: Charles-Andreas Brym (12)
- All statistics correct as of 18 November 2022.

The 2022–23 season was the 113th season in the history of FC Eindhoven and their 46th consecutive season in the second tier of Dutch football. The club competed in the Eerste Divisie and the KNVB Cup. The season covered the period from 1 July 2022 to 30 June 2023.

== Players ==
As of 29 August 2022

Note: Flags indicate national team as defined under FIFA eligibility rules; some limited exceptions apply. Players may hold more than one non-FIFA nationality.

No.	Pos.	Nation	Player
1	GK	NED	Nigel Bertrams
2	DF	CUW	Justin Ogenia
3	DF	TOG	Mawouna Amevor (captain)
4	DF	NED	Maarten Peijnenburg
5	DF	NED	Pieter Bogaers
7	DF	NED	Jasper Dahlhaus
8	MF	BEL	Sven van Doorm
9	FW	FRA	Lamine Diaby-Fadiga (on loan from Paris FC)
10	FW	NED	Naoufal Bannis (on loan from Feyenoord)
12	GK	NED	Jort Borgmans
14	FW	BEL	Pjotr Kestens
17	MF	BEL	Brian De Keersmaecker
20	MF	AZE	Ozan Kökçü

No.	Pos.	Nation	Player
21	MF	NED	Cas Faber
23	MF	NED	Koen Oostenbrink
24	MF	NED	Jordy Huybers
25	FW	CAN	Charles-Andreas Brym (on loan from Sparta Rotterdam)
26	FW	NED	Evan Rottier
28	DF	NED	Jarno Janssen
29	DF	NED	Miano van den Bos
31	GK	NED	TJ Odunze
32	DF	POR	Rodrigo Rêgo
33	DF	NED	Collin Seedorf
45	MF	NED	Yassine Azzagari
77	FW	LBR	Moussa Sanoh
99	MF	BEL	Tibo Persyn (on loan from Inter Milan)

=== Out on loan ===
Note: Flags indicate national team as defined under FIFA eligibility rules; some limited exceptions apply. Players may hold more than one non-FIFA nationality.

No.	Pos.	Nation	Player
—	MF	NED	Mitchel van Rosmalen (at VV UNA until 30 June 2023)

== Pre-season and friendlies ==
Win Draw Loss Fixtures

19 July 2022 Friendly	PSV (Netherlands)	5–0	(Netherlands) FC Eindhoven	Eindhoven
19:00 CEST (UTC+2)	Vertessen 12'; Saibari 24', 48'; Van Ginkel 32' (pen.); Antonisse 90'; Simons (yellow card) 90+2'	Report	Faber (yellow card) 78'	Stadium: Philips Stadion; Referee: Rob van de Ven

23 July 2022 Friendly	NAC Breda (Netherlands)	1–0	(Netherlands) FC Eindhoven	Sint Willebrord
17:00 CEST (UTC+2)				Stadium: Sportpark De Gagelrijzen

30 July 2022 Memorial Marc Steenackers	Beerschot (Belgium)	2–2 (4–2 p)	(Netherlands) FC Eindhoven	Antwerp, Belgium
16:00 CEST (UTC+2)	Vaca 83'; Sebaoui 86' (pen.)	Report	Amevor 14'; Bannis 42'	Stadium: Olympisch Stadion

== Competitions ==
=== Overall record ===
Competition	First match	Last match	Starting round	Record							
Competition	First match	Last match	Starting round	Pld	W	D	L	GF	GA	GD	Win %
Eerste Divisie	August 2022	May 2023	Matchday 1	19	9	6	4	31	24	+7	47.37
KNVB Cup	18 October 2022		First round	1	1	0	0	1	0	+1	100.00
Total				20	10	6	4	32	24	+8	50.00

Last updated: 6 January 2023
Source: Soccerway

=== Eerste Divisie ===
==== League table ====
Pos	Team	Pld	W	D	L	GF	GA	GD	Pts	Promotion or qualification
6	NAC Breda	38	18	5	15	64	64	0	59	Qualification for promotion play-offs
7	VVV-Venlo	38	16	10	12	56	51	+5	58	Qualification for promotion play-offs
8	Eindhoven	38	16	10	12	58	54	+4	58	Qualification for promotion play-offs
9	Telstar	38	14	11	13	39	52	−13	53	
10	De Graafschap	38	15	7	16	64	54	+10	52	

Source: Soccerway, Keuken Kampioen Divisie (in Dutch)
Rules for classification: Season in progress: 1) Most points won; 2) Less points lost; 3) Goal difference; 4) Goals scored; 5) Alphabetical order; End of season: 1) Points; 2) Goal difference; 3) Goals scored; 4) Head-to-head points; 5) Head-to-head goal difference; 6) Head-to-head away goals scored; 7) Play-off if relevant for deciding champion, relegation or participating in a European league, otherwise by draw. 8) Penalty shoot-out (only after a play-off)

==== Results summary ====
Overall								Home						Away					
Pld	W	D	L	GF	GA	GD	Pts	W	D	L	GF	GA	GD	W	D	L	GF	GA	GD
0	0	0	0	0	0	0	0	0	0	0	0	0	0	0	0	0	0	0	0

Last updated: 6 January 2023.
Source: Keuken Kampioen Divisie

==== Results by round ====
Round	1	2	3	4	5
Ground	A	H	A	H	A
Result	W	W	W	W	
Position					

Updated to match(es) played on 6 January 2023. Source: Keuken Kampioen Divisie
A = Away; H = Home; W = Win; D = Draw; L = Loss

==== Matches ====
The league fixtures were announced on 17 June 2022.
