= 2023–24 FC Eindhoven season =

FC Eindhoven
2023–24 season
- Manager: Willem Weijs
- Stadium: Jan Louwers Stadion
- Eerste Divisie: 14th
- KNVB Cup: Second round
- Top goalscorer: League: Ozan Kökçü (12); All: Ozan Kökçü (12)
- Average home league attendance: 2,782
- All statistics correct as of 10 May 2023.

The 2023–24 season was FC Eindhoven's 114th season in existence and 47th consecutive in the Eerste Divisie. They also competed in the KNVB Cup.

== Players ==
=== First-team squad ===
As of 10 May 2024

Note: Flags indicate national team as defined under FIFA eligibility rules; some limited exceptions apply. Players may hold more than one non-FIFA nationality.

No.	Pos.	Nation	Player
2	DF	CUW	Justin Ogenia
3	DF	TOG	Mawouna Amevor (captain)
4	DF	NED	Maarten Peijnenburg
5	MF	BEL	Maarten Swerts
6	MF	NED	Dyon Dorenbosch
7	DF	NED	Jasper Dahlhaus
8	MF	NED	Sven van Doorm
9	FW	DEN	August Priske (on loan from Midtjylland)
10	FW	AZE	Ozan Kökçü
11	FW	NED	Joey Sleegers
12	GK	NED	Jort Borgmans
14	FW	BEL	Pjotr Kestens
15	DF	NED	Luuk Wouters (on loan from RKC Waalwijk)

No.	Pos.	Nation	Player
18	DF	NED	Farouq Limouri
19	FW	NED	David Garden
20	FW	NED	Mart Lieder
22	FW	NED	Evan Rottier
23	MF	NED	Sven Simons
25	DF	NED	Tom Sas
26	GK	BEL	Jorn Brondeel
27	MF	NED	Achraf El Bouchataoui
30	GK	CUW	Nino Fancito
32	DF	POR	Rodrigo Rêgo
33	DF	NED	Collin Seedorf
99	MF	BEL	Tibo Persyn

== Transfers ==
=== In ===
Pos.	Player	Transferred from	Fee	Date	Source

=== Out ===
Pos.	Player	Transferred to	Fee	Date	Source

== Pre-season and friendlies ==
Win Draw Loss Fixtures

8 July 2023 Friendly	Fortuna Sittard (Netherlands)	1–1	(Netherlands) Eindhoven
12:00 CEST (UTC+2)

12 July 2023 Friendly	Eindhoven (Netherlands)	1–3	(Belgium) Lierse Kempenzonen
19:00 CEST (UTC+2)

15 July 2023 Friendly	Willem II (Netherlands)	4–0	(Netherlands) Eindhoven
13:00 CEST (UTC+2)

21 July 2023 Friendly	Eindhoven (Netherlands)	v	(Belgium) Beerschot
19:00 CEST (UTC+2)
Note: The match was cancelled due to safety measures.

26 July 2023 Friendly	PSV (Netherlands)	3–1	(Netherlands) Eindhoven
20:00 CEST (UTC+2)

29 July 2023 Friendly	Eindhoven (Netherlands)	2–2	(Belgium) RSCA Futures
16:00 CEST (UTC+2)

5 August 2023 Friendly	Lommel (Belgium)	1–1	(Netherlands) Eindhoven
15:00 CEST (UTC+2)

8 January 2024 Friendly	MSV Duisburg (Germany)	6–1	(Netherlands) Eindhoven
12:00 CET (UTC+1)

== Competitions ==
=== Overall record ===
Competition	First match	Last match	Starting round	Final position	Record							
Competition	First match	Last match	Starting round	Final position	Pld	W	D	L	GF	GA	GD	Win %
Eerste Divisie	13 August 2023	10 May 2024	Matchday 1	14th	38	9	16	13	45	57	−12	23.68
KNVB Cup	2 November 2023	19 December 2023	First round	Second round	2	1	0	1	1	2	−1	50.00
Total					40	10	16	14	46	59	−13	25.00

Last updated: 10 May 2024
Source: Soccerway

=== Eerste Divisie ===
==== League table ====
Pos	Team	Pld	W	D	L	GF	GA	GD	Pts	Promotion or qualification
12	VVV-Venlo	38	13	9	16	53	58	−5	48	
13	Cambuur	38	13	8	17	71	74	−3	47	
14	Eindhoven	38	9	16	13	45	57	−12	43	
15	Jong Ajax	38	10	10	18	54	69	−15	40	Reserve teams are not eligible to be promoted to the Eredivisie
16	Jong PSV	38	11	7	20	63	81	−18	40	Reserve teams are not eligible to be promoted to the Eredivisie

Source: Flashscore, Keuken Kampioen Divisie (in Dutch)
Rules for classification: Season in progress: 1) Most points won; 2) Less points lost; 3) Goal difference; 4) Goals scored; 5) Alphabetical order; End of season: 1) Points; 2) Goal difference; 3) Goals scored; 4) Head-to-head points; 5) Head-to-head goal difference; 6) Head-to-head away goals scored; 7) Play-off if relevant for deciding champion, relegation or participating in a European league, otherwise by draw. 8) Penalty shoot-out (only after a play-off)

==== Results summary ====
Overall								Home						Away					
Pld	W	D	L	GF	GA	GD	Pts	W	D	L	GF	GA	GD	W	D	L	GF	GA	GD
38	9	16	13	45	57	−12	43	4	8	7	21	29	−8	5	8	6	24	28	−4

Last updated: 10 May 2024.

==== Results by round ====
Round	1	2	3	4	5	6	7	8	9	10	11	12	13	14	15	16	17	18	19	20	21	22	23	24	25	26	27	28	29	30	31	32	33	34	35	36	37	38
Ground	H	A	H	A	H	A	A	H	A	A	H	A	H	H	H	A	A	H	A	H	A	H	H	A	A	H	A	H	A	A	H	H	A	H	A	H	A	H
Result	D	W	W	W	D	D	D	D	W	W	L	L	D	L	D	L	D	W	W	D	L	L	L	D	D	L	D	D	L	D	W	L	L	L	D	D	L	W
Position	11	5	3	1	2	4	5	4	4	3	4	6	8	11	10	12	12	10	10	10	10	12	13	13	13	14	14	14	14	14	14	14	14	15	15	15	15	14

Updated to match(es) played on 10 May 2024. Source:
A = Away; H = Home; W = Win; D = Draw; L = Loss

==== Matches ====
The league fixtures were unveiled on 30 June 2023.

13 August 2023 1	Eindhoven	1–1	Willem II	Eindhoven
12:15 CEST (UTC+2)		Report		Stadium: Jan Louwers Stadion; Referee: Erwin Blank

25 August 2023 3	Eindhoven	2–0	NAC Breda	Eindhoven
20:00 CEST (UTC+2)	Rottier 23'; Priske 90+1'	Report		Stadium: Jan Louwers Stadion; Attendance: 2,958; Referee: Rob Dieperink

1 September 2023 4	Telstar	0–1	Eindhoven	Velsen-Zuid
20:00 CEST (UTC+2)		Report	Oude Kotte 56' (o.g.)	Stadium: Sportpark Schoonenberg; Referee: Martin Perez

18 September 2023 5	Eindhoven	1–1	ADO Den Haag	Eindhoven
20:00 CEST (UTC+2)	Rottier 23'	Report	Veerman 37'	Stadium: Jan Louwers Stadion; Referee: Ingmar Oostrom

15 September 2023 6	Jong AZ	0–0	Eindhoven	Alkmaar
20:00 CEST (UTC+2)		Report		Stadium: Kalverhoek; Referee: Robin Vereijken

25 September 2023 7	Jong Ajax	1–1	Eindhoven	Ouder-Amstel
20:00 CEST (UTC+2)	Banel 38'	Report	Kökçü 90+2'	Stadium: Sportpark De Toekomst; Referee: Boyd van Kommer

29 September 2023 8	Eindhoven	1–1	Dordrecht	Eindhoven
20:00 CEST (UTC+2)	Amevor 90+4' (pen.)	Report	Kriwak 29'	Stadium: Jan Louwers Stadion; Referee: Laurens Gerrets

2 October 2023 2	MVV Maastricht	0–1	Eindhoven	Maastricht
20:00 CEST (UTC+2)		Report	Garden 69'	Stadium: De Geusselt; Referee: Nick Smit

6 October 2023 9	Den Bosch	0–1	Eindhoven	's-Hertogenbosch
20:00 CEST (UTC+2)		Report	Kökçü 55'	Stadium: De Vliert; Referee: Robin Hensgens

20 October 2023 11	Eindhoven	1–2	Helmond Sport	Eindhoven
20:00 CEST (UTC+2)	Rottier 28'	Report	Kaars 24'; Botos 56'	Stadium: Jan Louwers Stadion; Referee: Jesse Rozendal

23 October 2023 10	Jong PSV	3–4	Eindhoven	Eindhoven
20:00 CEST (UTC+2)	Uneken 45+1', 52', 70'	Report	Limouri 31'; Persyn 76'; Simons 80'; Kökçü 81'	Stadium: De Herdgang; Referee: Michael Eijgelsheim

27 October 2023 12	De Graafschap	2–1	Eindhoven	Doetinchem
20:00 CEST (UTC+2)	Warmerdam 40'; Colyn 54'	Report	Rottier 35'	Stadium: De Vijverberg; Referee: Richard Martens

6 November 2023 13	Eindhoven	1–1	Roda JC Kerkrade	Eindhoven
20:00 CET (UTC+1)	Amevor 12' (pen.)	Report	Spieringhs 59'	Stadium: Jan Louwers Stadion; Referee: Jeroen Manschot

10 November 2023 14	Eindhoven	0–2	VVV-Venlo	Eindhoven
20:00 CET (UTC+1)		Report	Kaastrup 7', 76'	Stadium: Jan Louwers Stadion; Referee: Dunken Van De Velde

24 November 2023 16	Groningen	2–1	Eindhoven	Groningen
20:00 CET (UTC+1)	Balker 18'; Duarte 82'	Report	Balker 36' (o.g.)	Stadium: Euroborg; Referee: Erwin Blank

27 November 2023 15	Eindhoven	0–0	TOP Oss	Eindhoven
20:00 CET (UTC+1)		Report		Stadium: Jan Louwers Stadion; Referee: Ingmar Oostrom

1 December 2023 17	Cambuur	2–2	Eindhoven	Leeuwarden
20:00 CET (UTC+1)	Smit 35' (pen.); Breij 69'	Report	Rottier 30'; Sleegers 83'	Stadium: Cambuur Stadion; Referee: Martin van den Kerkhof

8 December 2023 18	Eindhoven	3–2	Emmen	Eindhoven
20:00 CET (UTC+1)	Kökçü 20', 90+3'; Amevor 88'	Report	Paryzszek 7'; El Messaoudi 31'	Stadium: Jan Louwers Stadion; Referee: Martijn Vos

15 December 2023 19	Jong FC Utrecht	2–5	Eindhoven	Utrecht
20:00 CET (UTC+1)	Rijks 6', 90'	Report	Dorenbosch 33'; Rottier 71'; Sleegers 75'; Amevor 86'; Kökçü 90+3'	Stadium: Sportcomplex Zoudenbalch; Referee: Robin Vereijken

23 December 2023 20	Eindhoven	2–2	Jong Ajax	Eindhoven
21:00 CET (UTC+1)	Dorenbosch 12'; Kökçü 69'	Report	Sarfo 4'; Misehouy 56'	Stadium: Jan Louwers Stadion; Referee: Luuk Timmer

19 January 2024 22	Eindhoven	0–1	De Graafschap	Eindhoven
20:00 CET (UTC+1)		Report	Seuntjens 66'	Stadium: Jan Louwers Stadion; Referee: Wouter Wiersma

22 January 2024 21	Roda JC Kerkrade	3–0	Eindhoven	Kerkrade
20:00 CET (UTC+1)	Didden 16'; Peña Zauner 26'; Ould-Chikh 45'	Report		Stadium: Parkstad Limburg Stadion; Referee: Martin Perez

26 January 2024 23	Eindhoven	0–3	MVV Maastricht	Eindhoven
20:00 CET (UTC+1)		Report	Souren 51'; Smeets 86'; Dorenbosch 88' (o.g.)	Stadium: Jan Louwers Stadion; Referee: Martijn Vos

2 February 2024 24	Emmen	1–1	Eindhoven	Emmen
20:00 CET (UTC+1)	Paryzszek 52'	Report	Rottier 33'	Stadium: De Oude Meerdijk; Referee: Stan Teuben

9 February 2024 25	NAC Breda	2–2	Eindhoven	Breda
20:00 CET (UTC+1)	Janošek 5', 44'	Report	Priske 76', 84'	Stadium: Rat Verlegh Stadion; Referee: Edwin van de Graaf

18 February 2024 26	Eindhoven	0–3	Groningen	Eindhoven
16:45 CET (UTC+1)		Report	Valente 20'; Duarte 64', 70'	Stadium: Jan Louwers Stadion; Referee: Clay Ruperti

23 February 2024 27	VVV-Venlo	2–2	Eindhoven	Venlo
20:00 CET (UTC+1)	Smans 17'; Kosidis 89'	Report	Dahlhaus 50'; Kökçü 55'	Stadium: De Koel; Referee: Erwin Blank

1 March 2024 28	Eindhoven	1–1	Jong AZ	Eindhoven
20:00 CET (UTC+1)	Kökçü 64'	Report	Kewal 57'	Stadium: Jan Louwers Stadion; Referee: Boyd van Kommer

8 March 2024 29	Willem II	3–0	Eindhoven	Tilburg
20:00 CET (UTC+1)	Oosting 7'; St. Jago 52'; Bokila 74'	Report		Stadium: Koning Willem II Stadion; Referee: Marc Nagtegaal

11 March 2024 31	Eindhoven	3–0	Jong FC Utrecht	Eindhoven
20:00 CET (UTC+1)	Kökçü 11'; Viereck 37' (o.g.); Limouri 63'	Report		Stadium: Jan Louwers Stadion; Referee: Robin Vereijken

15 March 2024 30	Dordrecht	0–0	Eindhoven	Dordrecht
20:00 CET (UTC+1)		Report		Stadium: M-Scores Stadion; Referee: Alex Bos

29 March 2024 32	Eindhoven	0–3	Cambuur	Eindhoven
20:00 CET (UTC+1)		Report	Smit 26'; Balk 42'; van Kaam 72'	Stadium: Jan Louwers Stadion; Referee: Laurens Gerrets

5 April 2024 33	TOP Oss	2–1	Eindhoven	Oss
20:00 CEST (UTC+2)	Stensrud 58'; Allemeersch 72'	Report	Kökçü 11'	Stadium: Frans Heesen Stadion; Referee: Tom Stevens

12 April 2024 34	Eindhoven	2–5	Jong PSV	Eindhoven
20:00 CEST (UTC+2)	Lieder 47'; Rottier 56'	Report	Simons 22'; Nassoh 27', 90+3'; Abed 50'; van de Blaak 64' (pen.)	Stadium: Jan Louwers Stadion; Referee: Martin Perez

20 April 2024 35	ADO Den Haag	1–1	Eindhoven	The Hague
16:30 CEST (UTC+2)	van Wolfgang 24'	Report	Limouri 56'	Stadium: Bingoal Stadion; Referee: Alex Bos

28 April 2024 36	Eindhoven	1–1	Telstar	Eindhoven
12:15 CEST (UTC+2)	Rottier 3'	Report	Eddahchouri 55'	Stadium: Jan Louwers Stadion; Referee: Clay Ruperti

3 May 2024 37	Helmond Sport	2–0	Eindhoven	Helmond
20:00 CEST (UTC+2)	van den Hurk 7'; Van Keilegom 79'	Report		Stadium: GS Staalwerken Stadion; Referee: Erwin Blank

10 May 2024 38	Eindhoven	2–0	Den Bosch	Eindhoven
20:00 CEST (UTC+2)	Sleegers 52'; Kökçü 88'	Report		Stadium: Jan Louwers Stadion; Referee: Wouter Wiersma

=== KNVB Cup ===
2 November 2023 First round	TOP Oss	0–1	Eindhoven	Oss
20:00 CET (UTC+1)		Report	61' (pen.) Amevor	Stadium: Frans Heesen Stadion

19 December 2023 Second round	Eindhoven	0–2	Fortuna Sittard	Eindhoven
20:00 CET (UTC+1)		Report	30' Noslin; 49' Sierhuis	Stadium: Jan Louwers Stadion
