= Evan Rottier =

Dutch footballer (born 2002)

Personal information
- Full name: Evan Rottier
- Date of birth: 11 February 2002 (age 24)
- Place of birth: Maassluis, Netherlands
- Height: 1.73 m (5 ft 8 in)
- Position: Centre-forward

Team information
- Current team: ADO Den Haag
- Number: 11

Youth career
- –2012: MSV '71
- 2012–2015: Excelsior Maassluis
- 2015–2020: ADO Den Haag

Senior career*
Years	Team	Apps	(Gls)
2019–2020	Jong ADO Den Haag	3	(0)
2020–2022	ADO Den Haag	10	(0)
2021–2022	→ TOP Oss	1	(0)
2022–2025	Eindhoven	87	(25)
2025–	ADO Den Haag	59	(13)

International career
2017–2018	Netherlands U16	4	(0)
- * Club domestic league appearances and goals as of 24 October 2026

Evan Rottier (born 11 February 2002) is a Dutch professional footballer who plays as a centre-forward for Eredivisie club ADO Den Haag. He rejoined the club in 2025 from FC Eindhoven.

== Career ==
=== ADO Den Haag ===
Rottier played in the youth academies of MSV '71, Excelsior Maassluis, and ADO Den Haag, where he signed his first professional contract in 2020. During the 2019–20 season, he made three appearances for Jong ADO Den Haag in the Derde Divisie. In the 2020–21 season, he was included in the first-team squad for the opening match of the season, a 2–0 away defeat against Heracles Almelo.

==== Loan to TOP Oss ====
Afterwards, Rottier was no longer part of the first-team squad and was loaned to TOP Oss during the winter break. He made his professional debut for TOP Oss on 16 February 2021 in a 3–0 away defeat against SC Cambuur. He came on in the 75th minute as a substitute for Livio Milts. It remained his only appearance for the club.

==== Return to ADO ====
For the 2021–22 season, Rottier returned to ADO Den Haag, which had meanwhile been relegated to the Eerste Divisie. He made his debut for ADO on 8 August 2021 against Jong Ajax in a 2–0 victory, replacing Amar Ćatić in the 78th minute. He made 12 appearances for the club that season.

=== FC Eindhoven ===
In mid-2022, Rottier joined FC Eindhoven on a free transfer. He made his debut on 5 August 2022 against FC Den Bosch in a 3–1 victory. In the following match against Willem II, he scored his first goal for the club in a 2–1 win.

Rottier scored eight goals during the 2022–23 season, helping Eindhoven reach the promotion play-offs, where the club lost to Almere City FC after extra time. In the summer of 2023, he extended his contract until mid-2025.

During the 2023–24 season, he continued scoring regularly and finished with nine goals in 37 matches. In the opening match of the 2024–25 season, Rottier scored against FC Den Bosch in a 2–0 win. After another victory over Telstar (3–0), Eindhoven moved to the top of the table, although Rottier suffered an injury shortly afterwards. After returning from injury, he continued scoring, including twice in a 4–2 victory over SC Cambuur. He scored 25 goals in 95 appearances during his two-and-a-half years with the club.

=== Return to ADO Den Haag ===
During the winter break of the 2024–25 season, Rottier returned to ADO Den Haag. He made his return debut on 14 February 2025 against Jong Ajax in a 1–0 victory, replacing Luka Reischl in the 78th minute. Three weeks later, he scored his first goal after returning to the club against FC Emmen in a 1–0 win. He scored the only goal of the match in the 13th minute from an assist by Daryl van Mieghem.

== Career statistics ==
As of match played 24 October 2026

Appearances and goals by club, season and competition
Club	Season	League			Cup		Other		Total	
Club	Season	Division	Apps	Goals	Apps	Goals	Apps	Goals	Apps	Goals
Jong ADO Den Haag	2019–20	Derde Divisie	3	0	–		–		3	0
ADO Den Haag	2020–21	Eredivisie	0	0	0	0	–		0	0
TOP Oss	2020–21	Eerste Divisie	1	0	0	0	–		1	0
ADO Den Haag	2021–22	Eerste Divisie	10	0	2	1	–		12	1
FC Eindhoven	2022–23	Eerste Divisie	35	8	2	0	2	0	39	8
FC Eindhoven	2023–24	Eerste Divisie	37	9	2	0	0	0	39	9
FC Eindhoven	2024–25	Eerste Divisie	15	8	2	0	–		17	8
FC Eindhoven	Total		87	25	6	0	2	0	95	25
ADO Den Haag	2024–25	Eerste Divisie	13	3	0	0	2	0	15	3
ADO Den Haag	2025–26	Eerste Divisie	36	8	1	0	–		37	8
ADO Den Haag	2026–27	Eredivisie	10	2	1	0	—		11	2
ADO Den Haag	Total		59	13	2	0	2	0	63	13
Career total			124	30	9	1	4	0	137	39
