= Dahlhaus (surname) =

Dahlhaus is a German surname. Notable people with the surname include:

- Carl Dahlhaus (1928–1989), German musicologist
- Jasper Dahlhaus (born 2001), Dutch footballer
- Luke Dahlhaus (born 1992), Australian rules footballer
