= Boris van Schuppen =

Dutch footballer (born 2001)

Personal information
- Date of birth: 22 November 2001 (age 24)
- Place of birth: Breda, Netherlands
- Height: 1.75 m (5 ft 9 in)
- Position: Midfielder

Youth career
- Irene '58
- JEKA
- 2012–2021: NAC Breda

Senior career*
Years	Team	Apps	(Gls)
2021–2024	NAC Breda	50	(6)
2024–2026	Eindhoven	52	(11)
- * Club domestic league appearances and goals as of 28 April 2026

Boris van Schuppen (born 22 November 2001) is a Dutch professional footballer who plays as a midfielder.

== Career ==
=== NAC Breda ===
Born in Breda, North Brabant, Van Schuppen played for the local clubs Irene '58 and JEKA before joining the NAC Breda academy in 2012, and signed his first professional contract in February 2021.

He marked his debut, on the opening day of the 2021–22 Eerste Divisie season, by equalising in stoppage time away to VVV-Venlo, eleven minutes after replacing Pjotr Kestens. He went on to score six goals in 41 appearances in a season that ended in the promotion play-offs, where NAC were beaten by ADO Den Haag.

He started fewer matches over the following two seasons, and in April 2023 suffered a serious knee injury in training that kept him out for the rest of the year. With his contract expiring, NAC extended it by a year while he was still recovering, taking an option on a further season. He returned on 1 March 2024, as a late substitute against Jong Utrecht ten months after the injury, and made two further substitute appearances as NAC won promotion to the Eredivisie. The club did not exercise its option, and he left at the end of the season after twelve years and 58 league matches.

=== FC Eindhoven ===
Van Schuppen joined FC Eindhoven in July 2024 on a one-year contract with the option of another. It was the first season in which he was a regular starter, and he took to it immediately, scoring 11 goals and setting up 12 more; the club took up its option in the spring, by which point he had nine goals and ten assists from 27 matches.

Injury stopped him repeating it. He finished the next season without a goal and with a single assist, and on 31 March 2026 FC Eindhoven announced that his contract, one of six, would not be renewed. He spent part of the following summer on trial with De Graafschap without earning a contract, and as of October 2026 remained without a club, training with FC Den Bosch to keep fit.

== Career statistics ==
As of match played 24 April 2026

Appearances and goals by club, season and competition
Club	Season	League			Cup		Other		Total	
Club	Season	Division	Apps	Goals	Apps	Goals	Apps	Goals	Apps	Goals
NAC Breda	2021–22	Eerste Divisie	35	6	4	0	2 (Note: Appearances in Eerste Divisie promotion play-offs)	0	41	6
NAC Breda	2022–23	Eerste Divisie	12	0	2	0	—		14	0
NAC Breda	2023–24	Eerste Divisie	3	0	0	0	0	0	3	0
NAC Breda	Total		50	6	6	0	2	0	58	6
Eindhoven	2024–25	Eerste Divisie	33	11	1	0	—		34	11
Eindhoven	2025–26	Eerste Divisie	19	0	1	0	—		20	0
Eindhoven	Total		52	11	2	0	—		54	11
Career total			102	17	8	0	2	0	112	17
