= Jan Louwers =

Dutch footballer and businessman

Personal information
- Date of birth: 3 July 1930
- Place of birth: Eindhoven, Netherlands
- Date of death: 1 November 2012 (aged 82)
- Place of death: Eindhoven, Netherlands

Senior career*
Years	Team	Apps	(Gls)
1949–1960	FC Eindhoven		
1960–1963	PSV		
1963–1966	Roda JC		
1966–1967	FC Eindhoven		
- * Club domestic league appearances and goals

Jan Louwers (3 July 1930 – 1 November 2012) was a Dutch professional footballer and millionaire businessman.

== Career ==
Louwers played football for FC Eindhoven, PSV and Roda JC. The Jan Louwers Stadion is named after him.

After retiring in 1967 he became a wholesaler; in 1988 his company had a turnover of €80 million.
