= 2024–25 FC Eindhoven season =

FC Eindhoven
2024–25 season
- Manager: Maurice Verberne
- Stadium: Jan Louwers Stadion
- Eerste Divisie: 12th
- KNVB Cup: Second round
- Top goalscorer: League: Boris van Schuppen (6); All: Boris van Schuppen (6)

The 2024–25 season is FC Eindhoven's 115th season and their 48th consecutive season in the Eerste Divisie. In addition to the domestic league, the club also competed in the KNVB Cup.

== Transfers ==
=== In ===
Pos.	Player	Transferred from	Fee	Date	Source
MF	(Netherlands) Daan Huisman	Unattached	Undisclosed	10 August 2024	
FW	(Curaçao) Rangelo Janga	Unattached	Free	22 August 2024	
DF	(Netherlands) Terrence Douglas	(Croatia) Istra 1961	Undisclosed	29 August 2024	
DF	(Belgium) Matteo Vandendaele	(Belgium) RWD Molenbeek	Loan	2 September 2024	

== Pre-season and friendlies ==
13 July 2024 Friendly	Eindhoven (Netherlands)	0–1	(Qatar) Rayyan SC
16:00

17 July 2024 Friendly	NAC Breda (Netherlands)	3–0	(Netherlands) Eindhoven
19:30

24 July 2024 Friendly	PSV (Netherlands)	3–2	(Netherlands) Eindhoven
20:00

27 July 2024 Friendly	Blauw Geel '38 (Netherlands)	0–0	(Netherlands) Eindhoven
13:00

2 August 2024 Friendly	K. Lierse S.K. (Belgium)	4–1	(Netherlands) Eindhoven
19:00

3 August 2024 Friendly	SV Venray (Netherlands)	0–4	(Netherlands) Eindhoven
14:00

== Competitions ==
=== Overall record ===
Competition	First match	Last match	Starting round	Final position	Record							
Competition	First match	Last match	Starting round	Final position	Pld	W	D	L	GF	GA	GD	Win %
Eerste Divisie	9 August 2024	9 May 2025	Matchday 1		20	7	5	8	28	33	−5	35.00
KNVB Cup	29 October 2024	17 December 2024	First round	Second round	2	1	0	1	8	3	+5	50.00
Total					22	8	5	9	36	36	+0	36.36

Last updated: 20 December 2024
Source: Competitions

=== Eerste Divisie ===
==== League table ====
Pos	Team	Pld	W	D	L	GF	GA	GD	Pts	Promotion or qualification
9	Den Bosch (Note: Winner of the First Period (Rounds 1–9))	38	15	10	13	53	48	+5	55	Qualification for promotion play-offs
10	Jong AZ	38	14	10	14	69	63	+6	52	Reserve teams are not eligible to be promoted to the Eredivisie
11	Eindhoven	38	14	9	15	58	64	−6	51	
12	Roda JC Kerkrade	38	13	10	15	49	57	−8	49	
13	Helmond Sport	38	12	10	16	52	60	−8	46	

Source: Flashscore, Keuken Kampioen Divisie (in Dutch)
Rules for classification: Season in progress: 1) Most points won; 2) Less points lost; 3) Goal difference; 4) Goals scored; 5) Alphabetical order; End of season: 1) Points; 2) Goal difference; 3) Goals scored; 4) Head-to-head points; 5) Head-to-head goal difference; 6) Head-to-head away goals scored; 7) Play-off if relevant for deciding champion, relegation or participating in a European league, otherwise by draw. 8) Penalty shoot-out (only after a play-off)

==== Results summary ====
Overall								Home						Away					
Pld	W	D	L	GF	GA	GD	Pts	W	D	L	GF	GA	GD	W	D	L	GF	GA	GD
20	7	5	8	28	33	−5	26	2	3	4	5	14	−9	5	2	4	23	19	+4

Last updated: 20 December 2024.

==== Results by round ====
Round	1	2	3	4	5	6	7	8	9	10	11	12	13	14	15	16	17	18	19	20
Ground	H	A	H	A	A	H	A	H	A	A	H	A	H	A	H	A	H	A	H	A
Result	W	W	L	D	L	D	W	D	W	L	L	L	L	L	D	W	W	W	L	D
Position																				

Updated to match(es) played on 20 December 2024. Source:
A = Away; H = Home; W = Win; D = Draw; L = Loss

==== Matches ====
The league schedule was released on 24 June 2024.

9 August 2024 1	Eindhoven	2–0	FC Den Bosch	Eindhoven
				Stadium: Jan Louwers Stadion

16 August 2024 2	SC Telstar	0–3	Eindhoven

24 August 2024 3	Eindhoven	0–3	Jong Ajax	Eindhoven
				Stadium: Jan Louwers Stadion

30 August 2024 4	SBV Vitesse	1–1	Eindhoven	Arnhem

6 September 2024 5	De Graafschap	2–0	Eindhoven

13 September 2024 6	Eindhoven	0–0	FC Dordrecht	Eindhoven
				Stadium: Jan Louwers Stadion

22 September 2024 7	TOP Oss	0–4	Eindhoven

27 September 2024 8	Eindhoven	0–0	Roda JC Kerkrade	Eindhoven
				Stadium: Jan Louwers Stadion

4 October 2024 9	Jong AZ	2–3	Eindhoven	Alkmaar

18 October 2024 11	Eindhoven	0–3	FC Emmen	Eindhoven
				Stadium: Jan Louwers Stadion

21 October 2024 10	SC Cambuur	2–0	Eindhoven

25 October 2024 12	FC Volendam	4–1	Eindhoven	Volendam

1 November 2024 13	Eindhoven	0–4	ADO Den Haag	Eindhoven
				Stadium: Jan Louwers Stadion

8 November 2024 14	Excelsior	2–0	Eindhoven	Rotterdam

17 November 2024 15	Eindhoven	1–1	MVV Maastricht	Eindhoven
				Stadium: Jan Louwers Stadion

22 November 2024 16	Helmond Sport	3–4	Eindhoven	Helmond
20:00				Stadium: GS Staalwerken Stadion

29 November 2024 17	Eindhoven	1–0	Jong PSV	Eindhoven
20:00				Stadium: Jan Louwers Stadion

9 December 2024 18	Jong Utrecht	0–4	Eindhoven	Utrecht
20:00				Stadium: Sportcomplex Zoudenbalch; Attendance: 281; Referee: Robin Vereijken

13 December 2024 19	Eindhoven	1–3	VVV-Venlo	Eindhoven
20:00	Rottier 31'; Seedorf (red card) 86'		Wehmeyer 13'; Janssen 88'; Verheijen 90+3'	Stadium: Jan Louwers Stadion; Attendance: 2,313; Referee: Kevin Puts

20 December 2024 20	Dordrecht	3–3	Eindhoven	Dordrecht
20:00	Van Vianen 45+2'; Van der Avert 77'; Zandbergen 88'		Van Schuppen 16'; Dorenbosch 60'; El Bouchataoui 79'	Stadium: Stadion Krommedijk

=== KNVB Cup ===
29 October 2024 First round	Rijnvogels	0–7	Eindhoven	Katwijk aan Zee
21:00		Report		Stadium: Sportpark De Kooltuin; Referee: Rick Sturm

17 December 2024 Second round	Eindhoven	1–3	Excelsior	Eindhoven
20:00				Stadium: Jan Louwers Stadion
