= Koen Oostenbrink =

Dutch footballer (born 2000)

Personal information
- Date of birth: 26 January 2000 (age 26)
- Place of birth: Veldhoven, Netherlands
- Height: 6 ft 3 in (1.90 m)
- Position: Midfielder

Team information
- Current team: Nõmme United
- Number: 26

Youth career
- 2009: VV UNA
- 2009–2019: PSV

Senior career*
Years	Team	Apps	(Gls)
2019–2021	Jong PSV	5	(0)
2021–2023	Eindhoven	32	(2)
2024	Dundalk	14	(0)
2025	Dainava	23	(0)
2026–	Nõmme United	31	(3)

International career
2016	Netherlands U17	1	(0)
- * Club domestic league appearances and goals as of 17 November 2026

Koen Oostenbrink (born 26 January 2000) is a Dutch professional footballer who currently plays as a midfielder for Meistriliiga club Nõmme United.

== Club career ==
Born in Veldhoven, Oostenbrink began his career at the PSV youth academy in 2009. He eventually rose through the club's ranks and made his professional debut for their reserve side, Jong PSV, in the Eerste Divisie on 18 October 2019 against NEC Nijmegen. He came on as an 83rd-minute substitute for Sekou Sidibe as Jong PSV were defeated 0–1.

=== Eindhoven ===
On 4 August 2021, he joined Eindhoven as an amateur.

=== Dundalk ===
On 3 January 2024, Oostenbrink signed for League of Ireland Premier Division club Dundalk.

=== DFK Dainava ===
On 20 February 2025 Oostenbrink signed with Lithuanian Dainava Club.

== International career ==
Oostenbrink made his international debut for the Netherlands at the under-17 level on 30 September 2016 against Liechtenstein U17. He started as the Netherlands won 9–0.

== Career statistics ==
As of match played 13 September 2024

Appearances and goals by club, season and competition
Club	Season	League			Cup		Other		Total	
Club	Season	Division	Apps	Goals	Apps	Goals	Apps	Goals	Apps	Goals
Jong PSV	2019–20	Eerste Divisie	2	0	—		—		2	0
Jong PSV	2020–21	Eerste Divisie	3	0	—		—		3	0
Jong PSV	Total		5	0	—		—		5	0
Eindhoven	2021–22	Eerste Divisie	13	0	1	0	1 (Note: Appearance in the 2022 Eerste Divisie Play-offs)	0	15	0
Eindhoven	2022–23	Eerste Divisie	19	2	1	0	1 (Note: Appearance in the 2023 Eerste Divisie Play-offs)	0	21	2
Eindhoven	Total		32	2	2	0	2	0	36	2
Dundalk	2024	League of Ireland Premier Division	14	0	0	0	2 (Note: Appearances in the Leinster Senior Cup)	0	16	0
Career total			51	2	2	0	4	0	57	2
