= Djevencio van der Kust =

Surinamese footballer (born 2001)

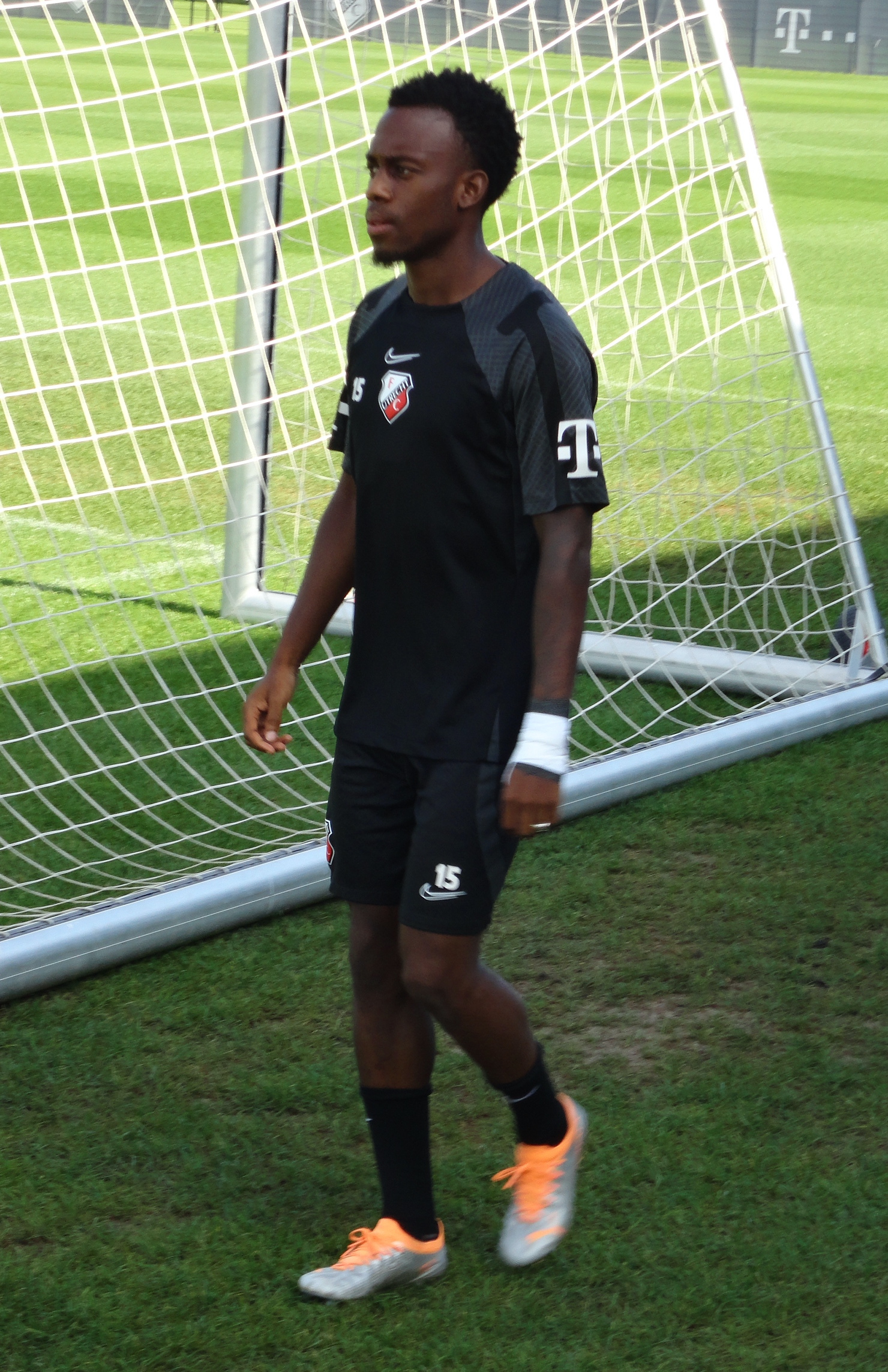
- Van der Kust with Utrecht in 2022

Personal information
- Full name: Djevencio Djovairo van der Kust
- Date of birth: 30 April 2001 (age 25)
- Place of birth: Netherlands
- Height: 1.78 m (5 ft 10 in)
- Position: Left-back

Team information
- Current team: Heracles Almelo
- Number: 15

Youth career
- –2012: AVV Zeeburgia
- 2012–2020: FC Utrecht

Senior career*
Years	Team	Apps	(Gls)
2020–2023	Jong Utrecht	48	(2)
2021–2023	FC Utrecht	20	(0)
2023	→ Houston Dynamo (loan)	0	(0)
2023	→ Houston Dynamo 2 (loan)	5	(1)
2023–2025	Sparta Rotterdam	43	(1)
2025	→ Beershot (loan)	6	(0)
2025–	Heracles Almelo	21	(0)

International career^{‡}
2023–	Suriname	16	(2)
- * Club domestic league appearances and goals as of 21 May 2026 ‡ National team caps and goals as of 4 November 2025

Djevencio Djovairo van der Kust (born 30 April 2001) is a professional footballer who plays as a defender for Eerste Divisie club Heracles Almelo. Born in the Netherlands, he plays for the Suriname national team.

== Club career ==
=== Utrecht ===
After playing youth football for AVV Zeeburgia, Van der Kust joined FC Utrecht's academy in 2012. He signed his first professional contract with Utrecht in December 2019, with the deal valid until mid-2022 with the option of a year's extension. Van der Kust made his debut for Jong Utrecht on 10 January 2020 in a 2–1 defeat to De Graafschap. He ended the season with 2 appearances for Jong Utrecht, playing primarily with the U-19 side. He scored his first career goal on 24 November 2020 in a 1–1 draw with Jong PSV. During the 2020–21 season he established himself as a regular for Jong Utrecht, making 26 appearances and scoring 1 goal.

On 15 August 2021, he made his Eredivisie debut for Utrecht in matchweek 1 of the 2021–22 season, coming on as a substitute in a 4–0 win over Sparta Rotterdam. On 9 November van der Kust signed a new contract lasting until 2025. He made his first start for Utrecht on 5 February 2022 in a 3–2 win over SC Cambuur. Van der Kust started 11 of Utrechts final 14 Eredivisie matches, helping them to a 7th-place finish. He also started both of Utrecht's European playoff matches, a 4–3 aggregate loss to Vitesse. He made 17 appearances and scored 1 goal for Jong Utrecht during the season.

Van der Kust started the 2022–23 season as the first choice leftback, appearing in 8 of the first 10 Eredivisie games with 7 starts and starting a KNVB Cup game. He then lost his spot in the first team, appearing in just 1 of the next 12 matches, his 1 appearance being a substitute in a cup match, and playing in 3 matches for Jong Utrecht.

=== Houston Dynamo ===
On 9 February 2023, Van der Kust signed for Major League Soccer side Houston Dynamo on loan with an option to buy.

=== Sparta Rotterdam ===
On 10 August 2023, van der Kust signed a three-year contract with Sparta Rotterdam.

On 3 February 2025, Van der Kust moved on loan to Beerschot in Belgium.

=== Heracles Almelo ===
On 18 July 2025, van der Kust moved to Heracles Almelo on a three-season contract.

== International career ==
Born in the Netherlands, Van der Kust is of Surinamese descent. He was called up to the Suriname national team for a set of 2023–24 CONCACAF Nations League matches in October 2023.

== Career statistics ==
=== Club ===
As of match played 11 January 2025

Club	Season	League			National Cup (Note: Includes KNVB Cup and U.S. Open Cup)		Continental		Other		Total	
Club	Season	Division	Apps	Goals	Apps	Goals	Apps	Goals	Apps	Goals	Apps	Goals
Jong Utrecht	2019–20	Eerste Divisie	2	0	—		—		—		2	0
Jong Utrecht	2020–21	Eerste Divisie	26	1	—		—		—		26	1
Jong Utrecht	2021–22	Eerste Divisie	17	1	—		—		—		17	1
Jong Utrecht	2022–23	Eerste Divisie	3	0	—		—		—		3	0
Jong Utrecht	Total		48	2	0	0	0	0	0	0	48	2
Utrecht	2021–22	Eredivisie	12	0	0	0	—		2 (Note: Appearances in the Eredivisie European play-offs)	0	14	0
Utrecht	2022–23	Eredivisie	8	0	2	0	—		—		10	0
Utrecht	Total		20	0	2	0	0	0	2	0	24	0
Houston Dynamo (loan)	2023	MLS	0	0	0	0	0	0	—		0	0
Sparta Rotterdam	2023–24	Eredivisie	30	1	2	0	—		1	0	33	1
Sparta Rotterdam	2024–25	Eredivisie	13	0	2	0	—		0	0	15	0
Sparta Rotterdam	Total		43	1	4	0	—		1	0	48	1
Career total			111	3	6	0	0	0	3	0	120	3
