= Yassine Tekfaoui =

Dutch footballer

Personal information
- Date of birth: 17 October 2001 (age 25)
- Place of birth: Amersfoort, Netherlands
- Position: Winger

Team information
- Current team: Hoogland

Youth career
- –2016: CJVV Amersfoort
- 2016–2018: IJsselmeervogels
- 2018–2021: Utrecht

Senior career*
Years	Team	Apps	(Gls)
2019–2021	Jong Utrecht	2	(0)
2021–2022	IJsselmeervogels	4	(0)
2022–2023	DHSC		
2023–	Hoogland		
- * Club domestic league appearances and goals as of 22 November 2024

Yassine Tekfaoui (born 17 October 2001) is a Dutch footballer who plays as a winger for Hoogland. He also holds Moroccan citizenship.

== Playing career ==
After being named talent of the year at his hometown club CJVV Amersfoort in 2016, Tekfaoui joined the IJsselmeervogels academy later that year. He regularly trained with the first team and even made his unofficial debut at the age of 15 in September 2017, appearing as a member of the starting lineup during a friendly against Magreb '90.

He made the switch to Utrecht in the summer of 2018, initially joining their under-19 team. After playing limited minutes off the bench in his first season, he had a breakout start to the 2019–20 season. He made his professional debut with Utrecht's reserve team Jong Utrecht on 6 December 2019, coming on for Hicham Acheffay in the final minutes of a 1–1 draw with MVV Maastricht. A few weeks later he signed his first professional deal with Utrecht.

On 31 August 2021, he terminated his contract with Utrecht by mutual consent and returned to IJsselmeervogels for the 2021–22 season.

== Career statistics ==
=== Club ===
As of 1 June 2020.

Club	Season	League			Cup		Continental		Other		Total	
Club	Season	Division	Apps	Goals	Apps	Goals	Apps	Goals	Apps	Goals	Apps	Goals
Jong Utrecht	2019–20	Eerste Divisie	1	0	–		–		0	0	1	0
Career total			1	0	0	0	0	0	0	0	1	0
