= Tibo Persyn =

Belgian footballer (born 2002)

Personal information
- Date of birth: 13 March 2002 (age 24)
- Place of birth: Kortrijk, Belgium
- Height: 1.79 m (5 ft 10 in)
- Position: Right midfielder

Team information
- Current team: RWDM Brussels
- Number: 99

Youth career
- 2012–2018: Club Brugge
- 2018–2021: Inter Milan

Senior career*
Years	Team	Apps	(Gls)
2021–2023	Inter Milan	0	(0)
2021–2022	→ Club Brugge (loan)	2	(1)
2022	→ Westerlo (loan)	4	(1)
2022–2023	→ Eindhoven (loan)	30	(0)
2023–2025	Eindhoven	44	(1)
2025–	RWDM Brussels	26	(1)

International career
2017	Belgium U15	2	(0)
2018–2019	Belgium U17	19	(0)
2019	Belgium U18	4	(1)
2020	Belgium U19	1	(1)
- * Club domestic league appearances and goals as of 20 April 2026

Tibo Persyn (born 13 March 2002) is a Belgian professional footballer who plays as a right midfielder for Challenger Pro League club RWDM Brussels.

== Club career ==
=== Inter Milan ===
Having joined the youth academy of Club Brugge in 2012, Persyn signed for Inter Milan in summer 2018, aged 16.

==== Loans to Club Brugge and Westerlo ====
In July 2021, he returned to Club Brugge of the Belgian First Division A on a season-long loan with the option to make the loan permanent. He made his professional debut on 15 August 2021, coming on as an 87th-minute substitute for Clinton Mata in a 4–0 league win against Zulte Waregem. Persyn's first goal for the club came on 22 August 2021 in the 55th minute of a 3–2 win against Beerschot.

On 27 January 2022, Brugge and Westerlo agreed that Persyn will join Westerlo until the end of the season.

=== Eindhoven ===
On 22 July 2022, Persyn joined Eerste Divisie club FC Eindhoven on a season-long loan.

On 15 July 2023, Persyn rejoined Eindhoven, this time on a permanent transfer.

=== RWDM Brussels ===
On 11 July 2025, Persyn signed for Challenger Pro League club RWDM Brussels, returning to Belgium. He debuted on the opening matchday of the season, starting in a 3–3 home draw against Lommel.

== International career ==
Persyn has represented Belgium at under-15, under-17, under-18 and under-19 levels. He made 3 appearances for Belgium at the 2018 UEFA European Under-17 Championship and 4 appearances at the 2019 UEFA European Under-17 Championship.

== Career statistics ==
As of match played 18 October 2025

Appearances and goals by club, season and competition
Club	Season	League			Cup		Other		Total	
Club	Season	Division	Apps	Goals	Apps	Goals	Apps	Goals	Apps	Goals
Club Brugge (loan)	2021–22	Belgian First Division A	2	1	0	0	0	0	2	1
Westerlo (loan)	2021–22	Belgian First Division B	4	1	0	0	—		4	1
Eindhoven (loan)	2022–23	Eerste Divisie	30	0	2	0	2 (Note: Appearance(s) in the promotion/relegation play-offs)	0	34	0
Eindhoven	2023–24	Eerste Divisie	14	1	1	0	—		15	1
Eindhoven	2024–25	Eerste Divisie	30	0	2	0	—		32	0
Eindhoven	Total		74	1	5	0	2	0	81	1
RWDM Brussels	2025–26	Challenger Pro League	9	0	1	0	—		10	0
Career total			89	3	6	0	2	0	97	3

== Honours ==
Westerlo

- Belgian First Division B: 2021–22
