= Ernest Faber =

Dutch footballer and manager (born 1971)

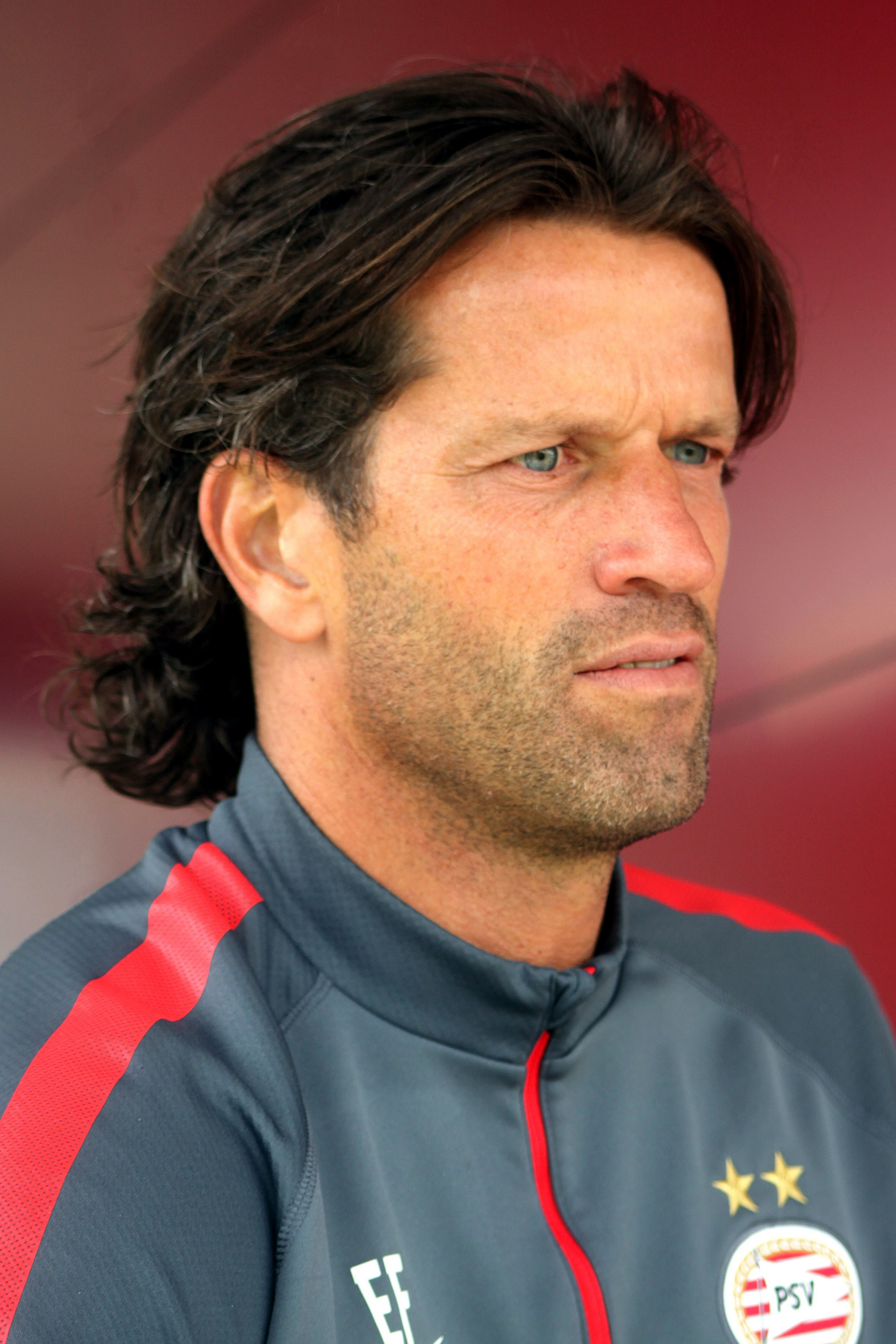
- Faber with PSV in 2014

Personal information
- Full name: Ernest Anthonius Jacobus Faber
- Date of birth: 27 August 1971 (age 55)
- Place of birth: Geldrop, Netherlands
- Height: 1.84 m (6 ft 0 in)
- Position: Centre-back

Team information
- Current team: Heracles Almelo (technical director)

Youth career
- 1977–1984: DBS
- 1984–1990: PSV

Senior career*
Years	Team	Apps	(Gls)
1990–2004	PSV	175	(6)
1990–1991	→ NEC (loan)	30	(0)
1991–1992	→ Sparta (loan)	32	(0)
1994	→ Groningen (loan)	11	(0)
Total		248	(6)

International career
1988-1990	Netherlands U19	12	(0)
1992-1993	Netherlands U21	7	(0)
1998	Netherlands	1	(0)

Managerial career
- 2005–2006: Jong PSV
- 2007: FC Eindhoven (caretaker)
- 2008: FC Eindhoven (caretaker)
- 2010–2012: FC Eindhoven
- 2012–2015: PSV (assistant)
- 2015–2016: NEC
- 2016–2018: Groningen
- 2018–2019: PSV (head of youth academy)
- 2019–2020: PSV (caretaker)
- 2024–2025: Adelaide United (technical director)
- 2025–2026: Heracles Almelo
- 2025–: Heracles Almelo (technical director)
- * Club domestic league appearances and goals

Ernest Anthonius Jacobus Faber (born 27 August 1971) is a Dutch professional football manager and former player who is the technical director of Eerste Divisie club Heracles Almelo.

Faber grew up in Eindhoven and played youth football at local club DBS until he joined PSV Eindhoven aged 13. Besides loan spells at NEC, Sparta and Groningen, Faber was part of PSV for 12 seasons and won four Eredivisie titles, a KNVB Cup and four Johan Cruyff Shields. He also played one match for the Netherlands national team in 1998. Injuries plagued Faber throughout his career and forced him to retire at age 32.

After his playing career, Faber worked at the PSV youth academy and at FC Eindhoven as assistant coach and manager. From 2011 until UEFA Euro 2012, he also served as assistant manager for the Netherlands national team. From March 2012, Faber worked as assistant manager at PSV. On 4 June 2015, he was appointed manager of Eredivisie side NEC. Faber then moved to fellow top division club Groningen in 2016.

== Early career ==
Born in Geldrop, Faber grew up in the Strijp neighbourhood in Eindhoven, which also included PSV's home ground, the Philips Stadion. At five, he started playing youth football at local amateur club DBS. Faber's performances led to interest from PSV and EVV, with PSV scout Gerrit van Tilburg having discovered him at DBS. He chose to join PSV at 13. Faber's original position was right winger, but at PSV, he moved to the central defense position under the guidance of former defender and youth coach Huub Stevens.

== Club career ==
=== Loan spells and first PSV years ===
To gain first-team experience, PSV loaned Faber out to NEC in 1990. He made his professional debut on 25 August in a 2–1 away win against MVV. In October, Faber was sent-off during a 7–0 loss to Ajax. NEC's season ended in 18th place and relegation; Faber appeared in 30 league fixtures and three cup games. For the 1991–92 season, Faber was loaned out to Sparta. He played 32 Eredivisie matches. Sparta finished eighth in the league and also reached the semi-finals of the KNVB Cup in which Faber played five games.

In 1992, Faber returned to PSV. In his debut match, he won the Dutch Super Cup after beating Feyenoord with 1–0. Faber appeared in 18 Eredivisie matches in his first season. He played his first UEFA Champions League match as a substitute against FC Porto. Faber's debut in the starting line-up followed in the home fixture over A.C. Milan, after the PSV squad was struggling with injuries. Coach Hans Westerhof assigned him to Milan's Marco van Basten, whom Faber managed to prevent from scoring. In the 1993–94 season, Faber played five league games for PSV before being loaned out to Groningen for the second half of the season. At Groningen, Faber played 11 matches. After finishing third in the 1994–95 season, PSV and Faber reached the second place a year later and also won the KNVB Cup.

=== Injury trouble ===
In 1996, Faber won his second Super Cup after defeating Ajax with 3–0. But in September, Faber tore his ankle ligaments after attempting a headed duel with Utrecht’s John van Loen. It turned out to be the first of a long line of injuries that would dominate Faber’s career. Cartilage was removed from Faber’s ankle, sidelining him for a long period. He would play only nine Eredivisie matches in the 1996–97 season, the year that PSV won the league. In the 1997–98 season, Faber played three matches before suffering an achilles tendon injury. He recovered in time for a training camp in Spain, but it was there when he noticed the injury did not completely heal yet. That year, Faber appeared in 21 league games and scored twice. In February, he was sent off in a match against Ajax. In May, Faber tore his right Achilles tendon in a match against Groningen. The injury was called "career threatening" by the PSV club doctor and forced Faber to recover for months, therefore missing out on a possible World Cup participation.

In the 1999–2000 season, Faber suffered new injuries on his hamstring, Achilles tendon and ankle. In February, he underwent an operation on his ankle, which had to be put in a cast. PSV won the Eredivisie that year, but Faber only appeared in three league matches. In the build-up to the 2000–01 season, PSV won the Johan Cruyff Shield after beating Roda JC with 2–0. Faber scored the second goal in the match. After the match, Faber ended up with an injured left knee. When a few weeks of rest did not solve the troubles, an operation followed in September. PSV clinched the league title again and this time Faber had a bigger contribution with 17 matches. In June 2001, Faber extended his contract with PSV for another two years. In the following two seasons, Faber played 42 Eredivisie matches and won his fourth league title in 2003, but was still struggling with his injuries. In the 2001–02 season, Faber received a head wound in the match against Heerenveen and suffered a minor knee injury. Newcastle United showed interest in signing him in early 2002, but after the new injury a possible deal was cancelled.

In February 2003, Faber signed a new one-year contract extension with PSV. A month later, he had to rest for a few matches to rest his hamstring. In April, Faber broke his metacarpus in a match against De Graafschap. In May 2003, while playing with a cast due to his metacarpus injury, Faber suffered an inflammation of a bursa near his Achilles tendon. The injury required surgery and continued to provide problems in the 2003–04 season. He finally returned in the Champions League match against AS Monaco in November 2003, but received a hamstring injury during that game. He returned in an exhibition match against Trabzonspor in January 2004, but Faber suffered a new hamstring injury. He was sidelined for another month. On 22 April, the verdict from independent medical staff was that Faber could not continue his career. He announced his retirement, effective on that day. During his career, Faber underwent 13 surgeries for his injuries. In May, Faber was granted a fan farewell during the season's last home game.

== International career ==
Faber played 12 games for the Netherlands national under-19 football team and 7 matches for the Netherlands under-21 team. In February 1998, his good performances with PSV were rewarded with a call-up by coach Guus Hiddink for the senior team trip to the United States. The Netherlands were scheduled to play exhibition matches against the United States and Mexico. After being an unused substitute in the United States match, Faber made a 58th minute appearance in the game against Mexico on 24 February 1998. The match was played in Miami. He replaced Winston Bogarde when the Netherlands were leading 3–0. Eventually, the game finished 3–2, with Faber causing a penalty in favour of Mexico. Faber was one of the players considered by Hiddink to be selected for the 1998 FIFA World Cup but after he injured himself before the start of the tournament, he was unable to appear.

== Managerial career ==
In the summer of 2005, Faber became coach of PSV's reserve team Jong PSV. In the 2005–06 season of the Beloften Eredivisie, Faber's team narrowly escaped relegation. But in September 2006, Faber left Jong PSV. He claimed that the team was neglected by PSV and not strengthened as promised. Faber's desire was to remain at the club, but the board did not offer him another position. Faber proceeded to join FC Eindhoven as their assistant manager in December 2006. In October 2007, FC Eindhoven sacked their manager Louis Coolen. Faber stepped up as caretaker manager for two months. He went back to his position as assistant when Gerald Vanenburg was appointed as the new manager in December. Seeking a new challenge, Faber announced in February 2008 he would leave FC Eindhoven at the end of the season. Before his departure, Faber had to become FC Eindhoven's caretaker manager again after Vanenburg resigned in April. He coached the team in the remaining three matches.

In 2008, Faber returned to PSV to coach the under-19 squad. He signed a two-year contract. In November 2009, Faber showed interest in becoming the PSV academy director. The other youth coaches favoured Faber as well, but the PSV board decided to appoint Jelle Goes. He decided to leave the club again after the 2009–10 season, even though PSV offered him the position of Jong PSV coach. In February 2010, he passed his coaching exam, enabling him to be a manager in the Netherlands. Faber simultaneously agreed on a two-year contract as manager of MVV Maastricht. But in June, he retracted his decision after he was unsure about the club's financial perspectives. MVV accepted Faber's decision. Faber subsequently became the manager of FC Eindhoven after signing a two-year contract. The team performed well in the Eerste Divisie, with a fifth place at the winter break period. In December, Faber was approached by VVV-Venlo to become their manager, but he rejected the offer.

In February 2011, Faber was appointed as assistant manager of Bert van Marwijk at the Netherlands national team. After Faber accepted the national team job, his performances with FC Eindhoven went downhill. With four points from the following eleven matches, FC Eindhoven missed out on a play-off spot. In the 2011–12 season, the FC Eindhoven performances were again above expectations. The team were third in the Eerste Divisie at the time Faber left the club. In March 2012, Faber returned to PSV as assistant manager after Fred Rutten was sacked as manager. Phillip Cocu was chosen as caretaker. Unlike Cocu, Faber's role was permanent after agreeing on a two-and-a-half-year contract. Faber was present at UEFA Euro 2012 when the Dutch team were knocked out in the group stage. Van Marwijk resigned following the elimination, while Faber also quit to fully concentrate on his job at PSV. Despite receiving several management offers in 2013, Faber signed a new two-year contract and continued to work as assistant manager after the appointment of Cocu as PSV manager. After three seasons as PSV assistant, including a brief stint as interim manager due to Cocu having an emergency surgery, Faber left to manage newly promoted NEC, where he remained for a season and impressed many rivals by leading the Nijmegen side to a top half finish in the league. In doing so he proved many pundits wrong. His performances caught the eye of FC Groningen, who appointed him manager in the pre-season of the 2016–17 season. Faber remained in Groningen for two seasons, before being sacked due to inconsistency of results and a failure to qualify for the European play-offs. In June 2018, Faber was appointed head of academy under new manager Mark van Bommel. In November 2019, following the unexpected sacking of Mark van Bommel, Faber was appointed interim manager for the remainder of the 2019–20 season. After a decent 6 from 11 games, the season was cancelled due to the global Covid-19 pandemic. PSV automatically qualified for the 2020-21 Europa League. Faber left PSV Eindhoven in July 2022, following the appointment of Roger Schmidt as head coach. Faber was also relieved of his duties as head of the PSV Academy, despite being the mastermind behind the first team breakthrough's of stars Donyell Malen and Mohamed Ihattaren.

In May 2024, he was appointed as the technical director at A-League Men side Adelaide United, subject to his visa.

On 28 November 2025, Faber signed a one-and-a-half-year contract as the head coach and technical director of Heracles Almelo in Eredivisie. On 20 May 2026, Faber was replaced as the head coach, while keeping the technical director position.

== Personal life ==
His son, Cas Faber, has played as a midfielder for FC Eindhoven.

== Career statistics ==
=== Club ===
Appearances and goals by club, season and competition
Club	Season	League		Cup (Note: Includes the KNVB Cup and the Johan Cruyff Shield)		Continental (Note: Includes the UEFA Champions League and the UEFA Cup)		Total	
Club	Season	Apps	Goals	Apps	Goals	Apps	Goals	Apps	Goals
NEC (loan)	1990–91	30	0	3	0	—	—	33	0
Sparta (loan)	1991–92	32	0	5	0	—	—	37	0
PSV	1992–93	18	0			8	0	26	0
PSV	1993–94	5	0			0	0	5	0
Groningen (loan)	1993–94	11	0	0	0	—	—	11	0
PSV	1994–95	21	1			0	0	21	1
PSV	1995–96	23	2			7	0	30	2
PSV	1996–97	9	0	2	0	0	0	11	0
PSV	1997–98	21	2	1	0	5	0	27	2
PSV	1998–99	3	0	0	0	1	0	4	0
PSV	1999–2000	17	1	1	0	7	0	25	1
PSV	2000–01	14	0	4	1	4	0	22	1
PSV	2001–02	20	0	3	0	8	1	31	1
PSV	2002–03	22	0	2	0	3	0	27	0
PSV	2003–04	2	0	0	0	2	0	4	0
Career total		248	6	21	1	45	1	314	8

=== International ===
Appearances and goals by national team and year
National team	Year	Apps	Goals
Netherlands
Netherlands	1998	1	0
Total		1	0

== Managerial statistics ==
As of match played 17 May 2026

Managerial record by team and tenure
Team	From	To	Record								Ref.
Team	From	To	P	W	D	L	GF	GA	GD	Win %	Ref.
FC Eindhoven (caretaker)	25 October 2007	20 December 2007	10	5	0	5	15	18	−3	50.00	
FC Eindhoven (caretaker)	1 April 2008	30 June 2008	3	1	0	2	6	8	−2	33.33	
FC Eindhoven	1 July 2010	13 March 2012	65	28	16	21	94	82	+12	43.08	
NEC	1 July 2015	1 July 2016	37	15	7	15	44	44	+0	40.54	
Groningen	1 July 2016	1 July 2018	74	20	27	27	116	115	+1	27.03	
PSV (caretaker)	16 December 2019	28 April 2020	11	6	3	2	18	9	+9	54.55	
Heracles Almelo	28 November 2025	Present	22	2	4	16	19	52	−33	9.09	
Total			222	77	57	88	312	328	−16	34.68	—

== Honours ==
=== Player ===
PSV

- Eredivisie: 1996–97, 1999–2000, 2000–01, 2002–03
- KNVB Cup: 1995–96
- Johan Cruyff Shield: 1992, 1996, 1998, 2000
