= Rayan El Azrak =

Dutch footballer (born 1999)

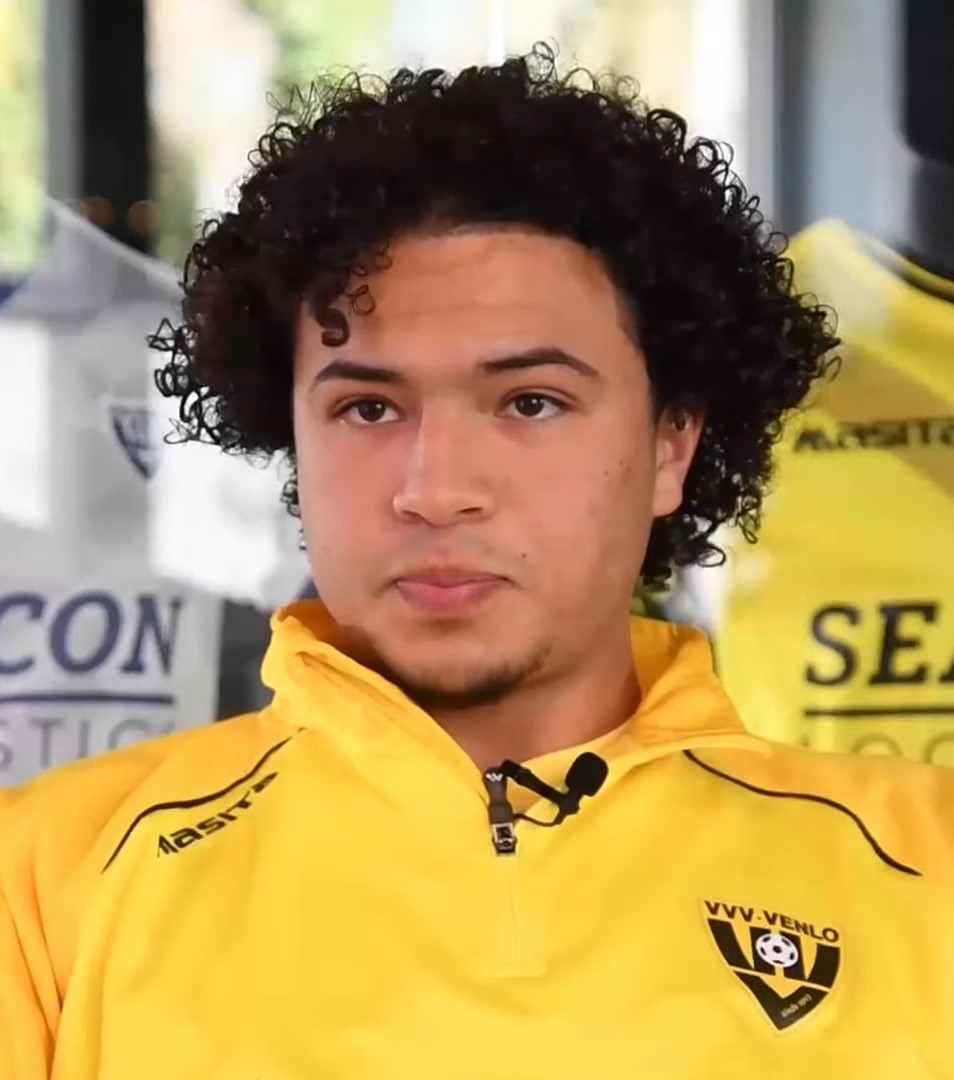
- El Azrak in 2022

Personal information
- Date of birth: 14 July 1999 (age 27)
- Place of birth: Amsterdam, Netherlands
- Height: 1.70 m (5 ft 7 in)
- Position: Midfielder

Team information
- Current team: Shaanxi Union
- Number: 10

Youth career
- –2008: Zeeburgia
- 2008–2016: Ajax
- 2016–2018: Utrecht

Senior career*
Years	Team	Apps	(Gls)
2018–2022	Jong Utrecht	50	(5)
2022	→ VVV-Venlo (loan)	14	(4)
2023	MVV	12	(1)
2023–2025	Triestina	54	(5)
2025	→ Shaanxi Union (loan)	11	(1)
2025–	Shaanxi Union	0	(0)
- * Club domestic league appearances and goals as of 5 July 2025

Rayan El Azrak (born 14 July 1999) is a Dutch professional footballer who plays as a midfielder for China League One club Shaanxi Union.

== Club career ==
=== Jong Utrecht ===
He made his Eerste Divisie debut for Jong FC Utrecht on 17 August 2018 in a game against Go Ahead Eagles, as a starter.

On 26 January 2022, El Azrak was loaned to VVV-Venlo.

El Azrak had his contract with Jong Utrecht terminated by mutual consent on 1 September 2022, making him a free agent.

=== MVV ===
On 2 February 2023, El Azrak signed a five-month contract with MVV, who picked him up on a free. He made his debut for the club on 10 February, replacing double goalscorer Ruben van Bommel in the 81st minute of a 5–1 Eerste Divisie win over TOP Oss. On 27 February, he scored his first goal for MVV, completing a comeback in 95th minute as his team secured a 3–2 upset win against league leaders PEC Zwolle.

=== Triestina ===
On 8 August 2023, El Azrak signed a two-year contract with Triestina in the Italian third-tier Serie C.

=== Shaanxi Union ===
On 3 February 2025, Triestina announced that El Azrak was loaned out to newly promoted China League One club Shaanxi Union, with an option from the Chinese club to buy El Azrak on a permanent basis.

== Personal life ==
Born in the Netherlands, El Azrak is of Moroccan descent.

== Career statistics ==
As of match played 26 January 2025

Appearances and goals by club, season and competition
Club	Season	League			KNVB Cup		Other		Total	
Club	Season	Division	Apps	Goals	Apps	Goals	Apps	Goals	Apps	Goals
Jong Utrecht	2018–19	Eerste Divisie	21	2	—		—		21	2
Jong Utrecht	2019–20	Eerste Divisie	10	1	—		—		10	1
Jong Utrecht	2020–21	Eerste Divisie	1	0	—		—		1	0
Jong Utrecht	2021–22	Eerste Divisie	18	2	—		—		18	2
Jong Utrecht	Total		50	5	—		—		50	5
VVV-Venlo (loan)	2021–22	Eerste Divisie	14	4	—		—		14	4
MVV	2022–23	Eerste Divisie	12	1	0	0	0	0	12	1
Triestina	2023–24	Serie C	37	3	—		—		37	3
Triestina	2024–25	Serie C	18	2	—		—		18	2
Triestina	Total		55	5	—		—		55	5
Career total			131	15	0	0	0	0	131	15
