= Gabriël Çulhacı =

Dutch footballer (born 1999)

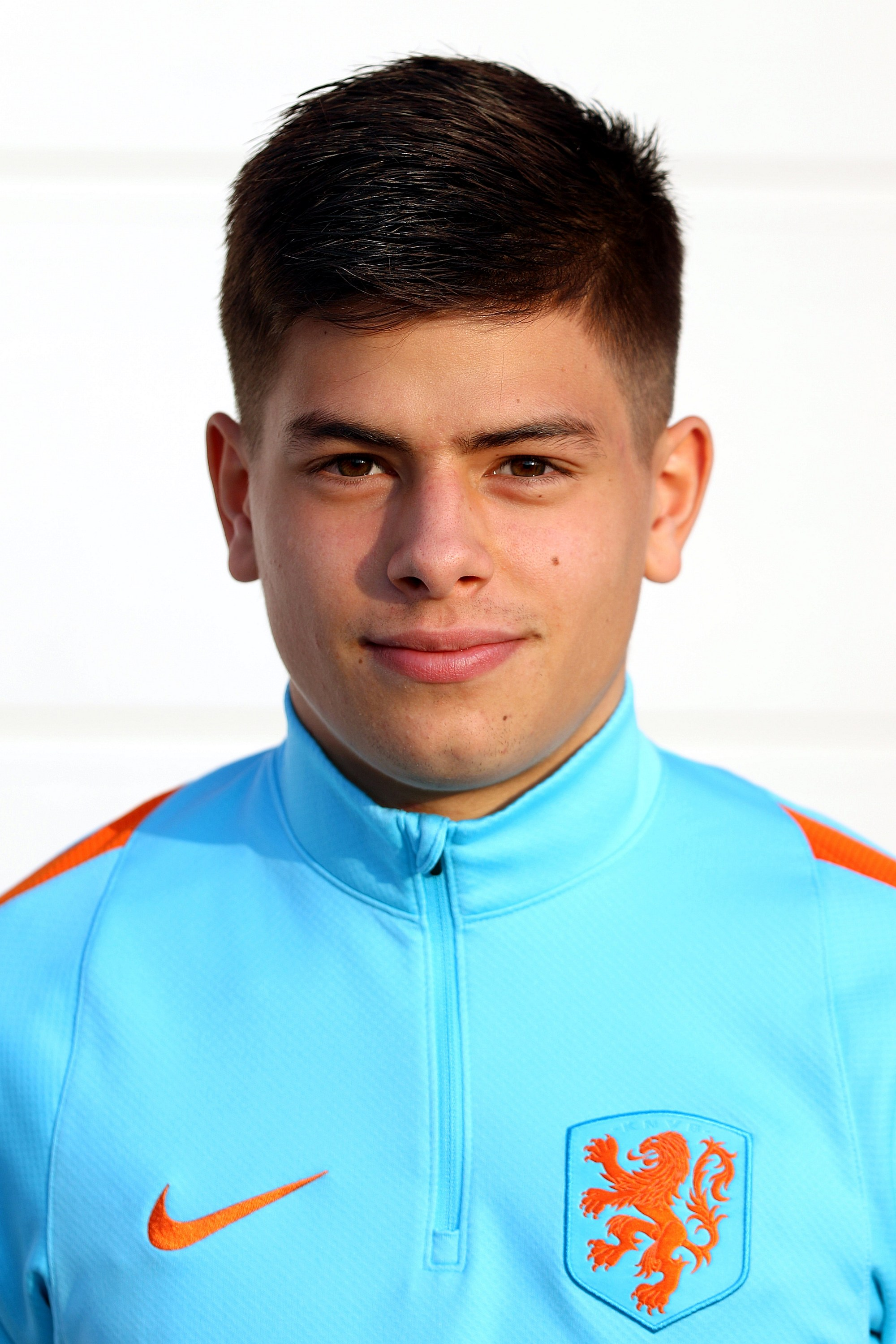
- Culhaci in 2017

Personal information
- Date of birth: 30 December 1999 (age 26)
- Place of birth: Amsterdam, Netherlands
- Height: 1.80 m (5 ft 11 in)
- Position: Left-back

Team information
- Current team: HB Køge
- Number: 5

Youth career
- –2012: Zeeburgia
- 2012–2018: Utrecht

Senior career*
| Years | Team | Apps | (Gls) |
| 2018–2022 | Jong Utrecht | 95 | (0) |
| 2020–2022 | Utrecht | 0 | (0) |
| 2020–2021 | → NEC (loan) | 3 | (0) |
| 2022–2024 | Helmond Sport | 30 | (0) |
| 2024– | HB Køge | 45 | (4) |

International career
| 2016–2017 | Netherlands U18 | 5 | (0) |
- * Club domestic league appearances and goals as of 7 December 2025

Gabriël Çulhacı (born 30 December 1999) is a Dutch professional footballer who plays as a left-back for Danish 1st Division side HB Køge.

== Club career ==
=== Utrecht ===
Çulhacı started his youth career with the academy of AVV Zeeburgia and later moved to the academy of FC Utrecht in 2012. On 30 December 2017, he signed his first professional contract with the club, penning a deal till the mid of 2020. On 17 August 2018, he made his debut for Jong FC Utrecht in a 5–0 defeat against Go Ahead Eagles. In the 2019–20 season, he sat on the bench for the first team for two games, but he did not play yet.

For the season 2020–21 he was loaned out to NEC Nijmegen. This loan period was prematurely ended on 28 January 2021.

=== Helmond Sport ===
On 21 April 2022, Çulhacı signed a two-year contract with Helmond Sport, with an option for an additional year. He made his Helmond debut on 23 September in a 2–0 away loss at Erve Asito to Heracles Almelo, coming on in the 62nd minute in place of Gaétan Bosiers.

=== HB Køge ===
On 31 January 2024, Çulhacı joined Danish 1st Division side HB Køge on a deal until the end of the season.

== International career ==
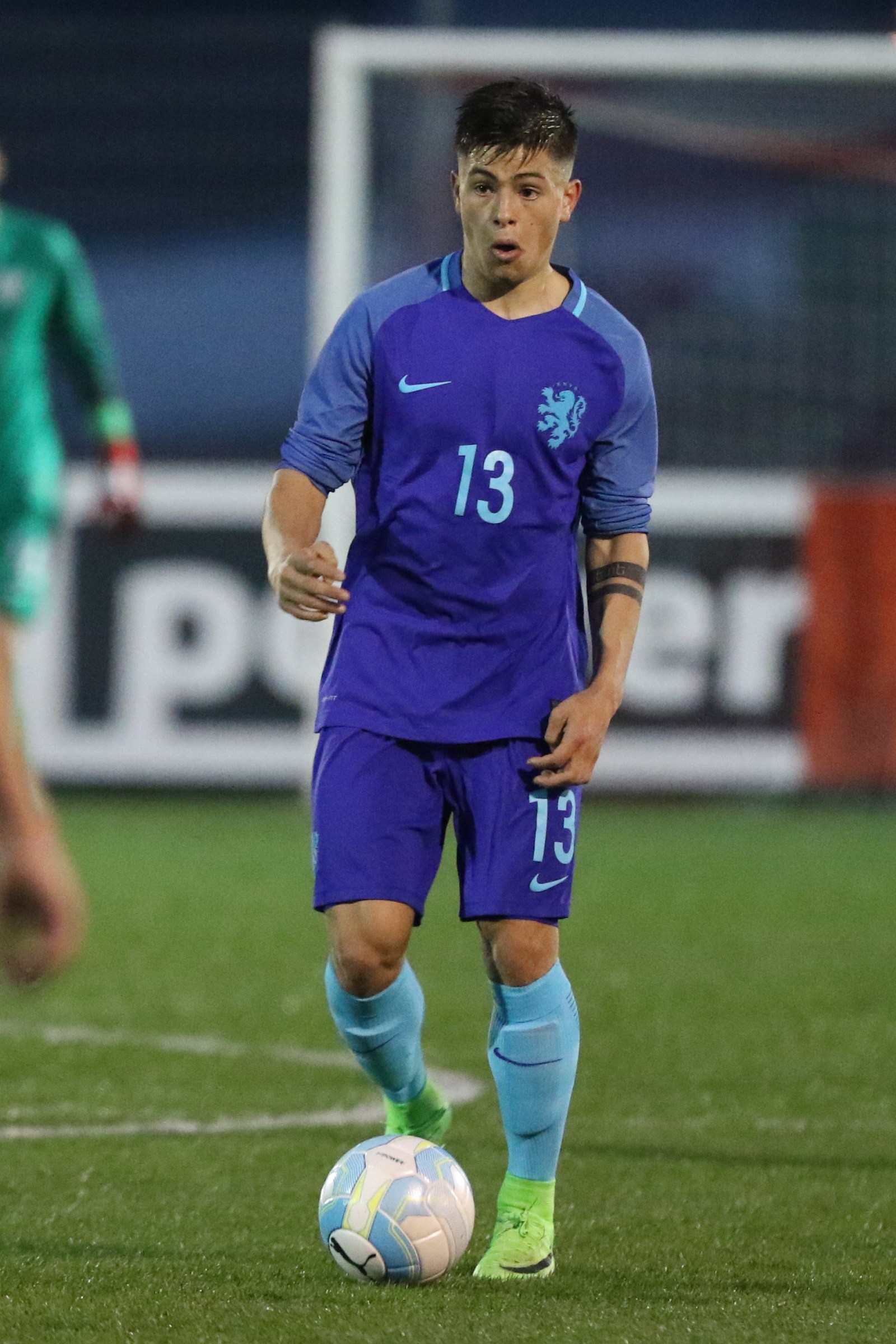
Culhaci playing for Netherlands under-18 against Austria

On 21 March 2017, Çulhacı was called to under-18 national team as a replacement for Tyrell Malacia for a friendly match against Austria.

== Style of play ==
Jordy Zuidam, the football director of FC Utrecht has described Çulhacı as a "fast, agile defender with a healthy urge forward". Zuidam also said that Çulhacı knows "how to combine his defensive qualities with his attacking drive".

== Career statistics ==
As of match played 4 November 2022

| Club | Season | League | | | Cup | | Continental | | Other | | Total | |
| Club | Season | Division | Apps | Goals | Apps | Goals | Apps | Goals | Apps | Goals | Apps | Goals |
|---|---|---|---|---|---|---|---|---|---|---|---|---|
| Jong Utrecht | 2018–19 | Eerste Divisie | 28 | 0 | — | | — | | — | | 28 | 0 |
| Jong Utrecht | 2019–20 | Eerste Divisie | 25 | 0 | — | | — | | — | | 25 | 0 |
| Jong Utrecht | 2020–21 | Eerste Divisie | 12 | 0 | — | | — | | — | | 12 | 0 |
| Jong Utrecht | 2021–22 | Eerste Divisie | 30 | 0 | — | | — | | — | | 30 | 0 |
| Jong Utrecht | Total | | 95 | 0 | — | | — | | — | | 95 | 0 |
| NEC (loan) | 2020–21 | Eerste Divisie | 3 | 0 | 0 | 0 | — | | — | | 3 | 0 |
| Helmond Sport | 2022–23 | Eerste Divisie | 4 | 0 | 1 | 0 | — | | — | | 5 | 0 |
| Career total | | | 102 | 0 | 1 | 0 | — | | — | | 103 | 0 |
