= Yuya Ikeshita =

Dutch association football player (born 2002)

Personal information
- Date of birth: 8 May 2002 (age 24)
- Place of birth: Utrecht, Netherlands
- Height: 1.83 m (6 ft 0 in)
- Position: Midfielder

Youth career
- Utrecht

Senior career*
Years	Team	Apps	(Gls)
2021–2023	Jong Utrecht	77	(2)
2023–2025	Den Bosch	30	(1)
- * Club domestic league appearances and goals as of 9 May 2025

Yuya Ikeshita (born 8 May 2002) is a Dutch professional footballer who plays as a midfielder.

== Career ==
Ikeshita began his career with Utrecht, making his debut for Jong Utrecht in March 2021. Ikeshita signed for FC Den Bosch in summer 2023. He was one of six players to make their debut for the club in a match in August 2023.

== Personal life ==
Ikeshita is of Japanese descent.

== Career statistics ==
As of 16 March 2025

Appearances and goals by club, season and competition
Club	Season	League			KNVB Cup		Other		Total	
Club	Season	Division	Apps	Goals	Apps	Goals	Apps	Goals	Apps	Goals
Jong Utrecht	2020–21	Eerste Divisie	8	0	–		–		8	0
Jong Utrecht	2021–22	Eerste Divisie	37	1	–		–		37	1
Jong Utrecht	2022–23	Eerste Divisie	32	1	–		–		32	1
Jong Utrecht	Total		77	2	0	0	0	0	77	2
Den Bosch	2023–24	Eerste Divisie	29	1	1	0	–		30	1
Den Bosch	2024–25	Eerste Divisie	1	0	0	0	–		1	0
Den Bosch	Total		30	1	1	0	0	0	31	1
Career total			107	3	1	0	0	0	108	3
