= Hicham Acheffay =

Dutch footballer (born 2000)

Personal information
- Date of birth: 10 August 2000 (age 26)
- Place of birth: Amsterdam-Oost, Netherlands
- Height: 1.69 m (5 ft 7 in)
- Position: Forward

Youth career
- 2006–2008: Zeeburgia
- 2008–2010: Ajax
- 2010–2014: Zeeburgia
- 2014–2016: Volendam
- 2016–2018: Vitesse

Senior career*
| Years | Team | Apps | (Gls) |
| 2017–2019 | Jong Vitesse | 39 | (12) |
| 2019–2021 | Jong FC Utrecht | 46 | (10) |
| 2021 | Grasshoppers | 2 | (0) |
| 2021 | Grasshoppers II | 2 | (0) |
| 2021–2023 | De Graafschap | 34 | (2) |
| 2023 | PEC Zwolle | 5 | (0) |
| 2024–2026 | Den Bosch | 36 | (2) |
- * Club domestic league appearances and goals as of 24 April 2026

Hicham Acheffay (born 10 August 2000) is a Dutch professional footballer who plays as a forward.

Acheffay began his youth career in Amsterdam, playing for various clubs including Zeeburgia and Ajax, before joining Vitesse's youth academy. He made his professional debut with Jong Utrecht in 2019 before signing with Grasshoppers in 2021. After stints with De Graafschap and PEC Zwolle, he joined Den Bosch in 2024.

== Career ==
=== Early career ===
Growing up in Amsterdam-Oost, Acheffay played youth football for Zeeburgia, Ajax, Zeeburgia again, FC Volendam and Vitesse. From 2017 to 2019, he was part of Jong Vitesse, the second team of the Vitesse. In the 2016–17 season, he suffered relegation with the team from the Tweede Divisie to the Derde Divisie, only to win promotion as champions again the following season.

After the 2018–19 season, Jong Vitesse withdrew from the league system and in the summer of 2019, free agent Acheffay signed with Jong Utrecht on a deal until July 2022, with an option for an extra year. He made his professional debut with the second team 10 August 2019 in a 2–0 loss in the Eerste Divisie against Excelsior. He came on as a substitute for Eros Maddy in the 77th minute.

=== Grasshoppers ===
On 20 January 2021, Acheffay signed a one-and-a-half-year contract with Grasshoppers, the most successful club in Swiss football history who had suffered relegated to the second-tier Challenge League in 2019. Although he became part of the title-winning team, his contribution on the pitch was very limited with two short substitutions. Acheffay's contract was terminated prematurely and he appeared at a trial with VVV-Venlo on 28 June 2021 at VVV-Venlo, but this did not result in a permanent deal.

=== De Graafschap ===
In July 2021, Acheffay signed a two-year contract with an option for an additional year with De Graafschap. He made his debut on 7 August in a 3–0 home loss to Roda JC Kerkrade, coming on as a substitute for Giovanni Korte in the 72nd minute. Mostly coming on from the bench during the start of the season, Acheffay quickly developed into a starter during the fall of the 2021–22 season.

Acheffay scored his first goal for De Graafschap on 28 October 2022, slotting home a pass from Siem de Jong through the legs of goalkeeper Thijs Jansen to secure a 2–0 home victory.

On 20 January 2023, Acheffay's contract with De Graafschap was dissolved by mutual consent.

=== PEC Zwolle ===
On 26 January 2023, Acheffay joined PEC Zwolle until the end of the 2022–23 season. He made his debut for the club on 6 February, replacing Lennart Thy in the 87th minute of a 0–0 draw against Jong Ajax. On 27 February, he made his first start for PEC, playing 68 minutes in a league game against MVV. Following his first start for the club, Acheffay talked about his first months at PEC saying, "Coaches here love football more than at De Graafschap," and elaborated on his refound joy in playing football stating, "I just have to be free in my mind."

=== Den Bosch ===
On 13 June 2024, Acheffay signed a two-season contract with Den Bosch, after one year without a club. He made his debut for the club on 9 August, the first matchday of the season, starting in a 2–0 away loss to Eindhoven.

== Career statistics ==
As of match played 13 December 2024

Appearances and goals by club, season and competition
| Club | Season | League | | | National cup (Note: Includes Swiss Cup, KNVB Cup) | | Other | | Total | |
| Club | Season | Division | Apps | Goals | Apps | Goals | Apps | Goals | Apps | Goals |
|---|---|---|---|---|---|---|---|---|---|---|
| Jong Vitesse | 2016–17 | Tweede Divisie | 6 | 2 | — | | — | | 6 | 2 |
| Jong Vitesse | 2017–18 | Derde Divisie | 1 | 0 | — | | — | | 1 | 0 |
| Jong Vitesse | 2018–19 | Tweede Divisie | 32 | 10 | — | | — | | 32 | 10 |
| Jong Vitesse | Total | | 39 | 12 | — | | — | | 39 | 12 |
| Jong Utrecht | 2019–20 | Eerste Divisie | 27 | 6 | — | | — | | 27 | 6 |
| Jong Utrecht | 2020–21 | Eerste Divisie | 19 | 4 | — | | — | | 19 | 4 |
| Jong Utrecht | Total | | 46 | 10 | — | | — | | 46 | 10 |
| Grasshoppers | 2020–21 | Challenge League | 2 | 0 | 1 | 0 | — | | 3 | 0 |
| Grasshoppers II | 2020–21 | 1. Liga | 2 | 0 | — | | — | | 2 | 0 |
| De Graafschap | 2021–22 | Eerste Divisie | 25 | 0 | 1 | 0 | 0 | 0 | 26 | 0 |
| De Graafschap | 2022–23 | Eerste Divisie | 9 | 2 | 1 | 0 | — | | 10 | 2 |
| De Graafschap | Total | | 34 | 2 | 2 | 0 | — | | 36 | 2 |
| PEC Zwolle | 2022–23 | Eerste Divisie | 5 | 0 | 0 | 0 | — | | 5 | 0 |
| Den Bosch | 2024–25 | Eerste Divisie | 19 | 2 | 1 | 0 | — | | 20 | 2 |
| Career total | | | 147 | 26 | 4 | 0 | 0 | 0 | 151 | 26 |

== Honours ==
Jong Vitesse

- Derde Divisie – Sunday: 2017–18

Grasshoppers

- Swiss Challenge League: 2020–21
