= Cas Faber =

Dutch footballer

Personal information
- Date of birth: 18 June 1999 (age 27)
- Place of birth: Geldrop, Netherlands
- Height: 1.84 m (6 ft 1/2 in)
- Position: Midfielder

Team information
- Current team: De Valk

Youth career
- –2018: FC Groningen

Senior career*
Years	Team	Apps	(Gls)
2018	Jong Groningen	1	(0)
2018–2023	FC Eindhoven	17	(1)
2023–2024	UNA	0	(0)
- * Club domestic league appearances and goals as of 19 May 2023

Cas Faber (born 18 June 1999) is a Dutch professional footballer who plays as a midfielder for amateur side De Valk.

== Club career ==
Having previously played in the Derde Divisie with Jong Groningen, he made his professional debut for FC Eindhoven on 4 October 2019 in a 6–0 defeat away at Jong Ajax.

On 23 May 2023, Faber agreed to join UNA for the 2023–24 season. He quit football in 2024 after an injury-hit season but came out of retirement to join De Valk in summer 2026.

== Personal life ==
He is the son of Ernest Faber.

== Career statistics ==
As of 1 June 2020

Appearances and goals by club, season and competition
Club	Season	League			KNVB Cup		Other		Total	
Club	Season	Division	Apps	Goals	Apps	Goals	Apps	Goals	Apps	Goals
Jong Groningen	2017–18	Derde Divisie	1	0	—		0	0	1	0
FC Eindhoven	2019–20	Eerste Divisie	5	0	1	0	0	0	6	0
Career total			6	0	0	0	0	0	7	0
