= Rick Meissen =

Dutch footballer (born 2002)

Personal information
- Date of birth: 24 February 2002 (age 24)
- Place of birth: Amsterdam, Netherlands
- Height: 1.93 m (6 ft 4 in)
- Position: Centre-back

Team information
- Current team: Excelsior
- Number: 3

Youth career
- 2014–2016: AVV Zeeburgia
- 2016–2020: FC Utrecht

Senior career*
Years	Team	Apps	(Gls)
2020–2023	Utrecht	1	(0)
2020–2023	Jong Utrecht	58	(0)
2023	Jong Sparta	3	(0)
2023–2025	Sparta Rotterdam	45	(0)
2025–	Excelsior	33	(0)
- * Club domestic league appearances and goals as of 17 May 2026

Rick Meissen (born 24 February 2002) is a Dutch professional footballer who plays as a centre-back for Eredivisie club Excelsior.

== Career ==
Meissen moved from AVV Zeeburgia to FC Utrecht in the summer of 2016. On 25 February 2020 he signed his first professional contract with Utrecht signing until the summer of 2023, with the option of an extra year. He made his Eerste Divisie debut on 19 March 2021 against Helmond Sport. Meissen made his Eredivisie debut on 13 March 2022 at home against PSV Eindhoven in a 1–0 defeat.

On 30 January 2023, Meissen signed for Sparta Rotterdam on a three-and-a-half-year deal.

On 4 August 2025, Meissen moved to Excelsior on a two-year contract.

== Career statistics ==
As of match played 11 May 2025

Appearances and goals by club, season and competition
Club	Season	League			National cup		Europe		Other		Total	
Club	Season	Division	Apps	Goals	Apps	Goals	Apps	Goals	Apps	Goals	Apps	Goals
Jong Utrecht	2020–21	Eerste Divisie	9	0	—		—		—		9	0
Jong Utrecht	2021–22	Eerste Divisie	30	0	—		—		—		30	0
Jong Utrecht	2022–23	Eerste Divisie	19	0	—		—		—		19	0
Jong Utrecht	Total		58	0	—		—		—		58	0
Utrecht	2021–22	Eredivisie	1	0	0	0	—		—		1	0
Jong Sparta Rotterdam	2023–24	Tweede Divisie	3	0	—		—		—		3	0
Sparta Rotterdam	2022–23	Eredivisie	4	0	0	0	—		—		4	0
Sparta Rotterdam	2023–24	Eredivisie	21	0	1	0	—		1 (Note: Appearance in Eredivisie European Play-offs)	0	23	0
Sparta Rotterdam	2024–25	Eredivisie	20	0	2	0	—		0	0	22	0
Sparta Rotterdam	Total		45	0	3	0	—		1	0	49	0
Career total			107	0	3	0	0	0	1	0	111	0
