= Jurre van Aken =

Dutch football player (born 2003)

Personal information
- Full name: George Jurre van Aken
- Date of birth: 23 March 2003 (age 23)
- Place of birth: Obdam, Netherlands
- Height: 1.80 m (5 ft 11 in)
- Position: Defender

Team information
- Current team: Dordrecht
- Number: 22

Youth career
- -2014: Victoria Obdam
- 2014-2022: AZ Alkmaar

Senior career*
Years	Team	Apps	(Gls)
2022–2025	Jong AZ	82	(4)
2025–	Dordrecht	25	(2)

International career
2021	Netherlands U19		
- * Club domestic league appearances and goals as of 27 May 2026

Jurre van Aken (born 23 March 2003) is a Dutch footballer who plays as a defender for FC Dordrecht in the Eerste Divisie.

== Club career ==
=== AZ Alkmaar ===
Van Aken joined the academy at AZ Alkmaar in 2014 from amateur side Victoria Obdam. By following the route from Victoria Ondam to AZ van Aken was hoping to follow in the footsteps of former Cameroon international Willie Overtoom who also took that pathway. He signed a pro contract with AZ in June 2021 up to the summer of 2023, with the option of an extra season. He made his debut in the Eerste Divisie on 15 April 2022 against ADO Den Haag appearing as a substitute in a 1–0 home defeat. He scored his first league goal on 27 January 2023 away at NAC Breda. In April 2023 he played in the 2022-23 UEFA Youth League final against Hajduk Split as AZ ran out 5–0 winners.

=== FC Dordrecht ===
After joining FC Dordrecht under manager Dirk Kuyt in 2025, he made his debut in a 1–0 win over SC Cambuur on 8 August 2025.

== International career ==
Van Aken was called up to the Netherlands U19 squad in October 2021.
