= Eros Maddy =

Dutch footballer (born 2001)

Personal information
- Full name: Eros Horatio Emmanuel Maddy
- Date of birth: 5 February 2001 (age 25)
- Place of birth: Woerden, Netherlands
- Height: 1.77 m (5 ft 10 in)
- Position: Right winger

Team information
- Current team: Auxerre

Youth career
- –2014: Sparta Rotterdam
- 2014–2019: Ajax

Senior career*
Years	Team	Apps	(Gls)
2018–2019	Jong Ajax	2	(0)
2019–2022	Jong Utrecht	50	(3)
2020–2022	Utrecht	1	(0)
2022–2023	Helmond Sport	30	(1)
2023–2026	Auxerre	16	(0)
2023–2026	Auxerre II	9	(0)
2025–2026	→ Laval (loan)	12	(0)

International career
2015–2016	Netherlands U15	8	(2)
2019	Netherlands U19	2	(0)
- * Club domestic league appearances and goals as of 12 May 2026

Eros Horatio Emmanuel Maddy (born 5 February 2001) is a Dutch professional footballer who plays as a right winger. He is currently a free agent.

== Club career ==
He made his Eerste Divisie debut for Jong Ajax on 20 November 2018 in a game against Jong FC Utrecht as a 60th-minute substitute for Sebastian Pasquali.

On 13 July 2022, Maddy signed a two-year contract with an option for an additional season with Helmond Sport. He made his competitive debut for the club on 5 August, the opening matchday of the 2022–23 Eerste Divisie season, replacing Peter van Ooijen in the 74th minute of a 1–0 away loss.

On 25 July 2023, Maddy moved to Auxerre in France on a three-year deal, with an optional fourth year.

On 1 September 2025, Maddy was loaned by Laval in Ligue 2.

== Personal life ==
Born in the Netherlands, Maddy is of Surinamese and Sierra Leonian descent.

== Honours ==
Auxerre

- Ligue 2: 2023–24
