= Mawouna Amevor =

Togolese footballer (born 1991)

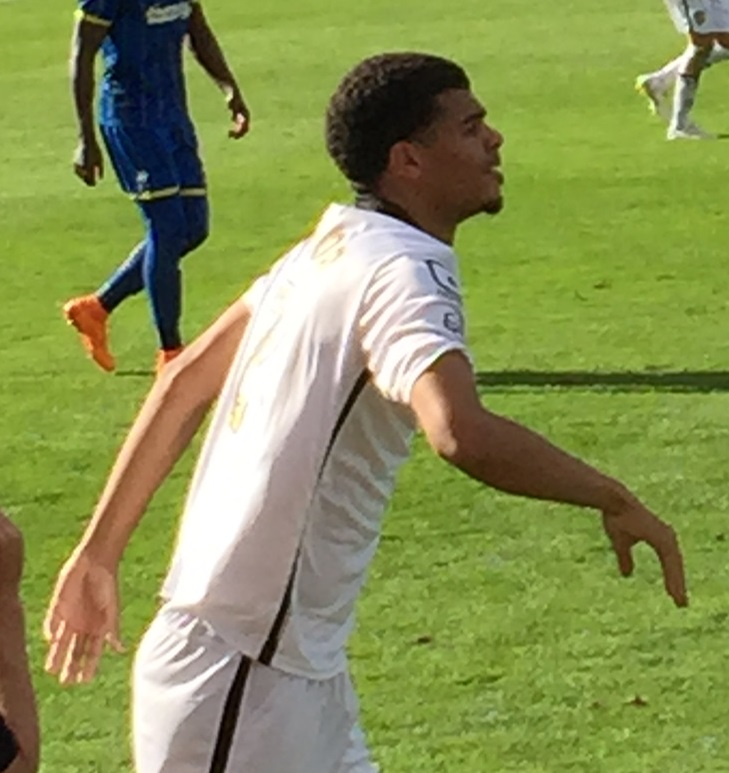
- Amevor with Notts County in 2015

Personal information
- Full name: Mawouna Kodjo Amevor
- Date of birth: 16 December 1991 (age 34)
- Place of birth: Rotterdam, Netherlands
- Height: 1.91 m (6 ft 3 in)
- Position: Centre-back

Team information
- Current team: Volendam
- Number: 3

Youth career
- ASV-DWV
- EDS
- RKSV Leonidas
- SC Feijenoord
- Dordrecht

Senior career*
Years	Team	Apps	(Gls)
2010–2013	Dordrecht	71	(4)
2013–2015	Go Ahead Eagles	35	(2)
2015–2016	Notts County	11	(1)
2016–2018	Dordrecht	56	(0)
2018	Chabab Rif Al Hoceima	0	(0)
2019	Chonburi	0	(0)
2019	Persela Lamongan	12	(0)
2020–2024	Eindhoven	146	(15)
2024–	Volendam	66	(3)

International career^{‡}
2014–	Togo	13	(0)
- * Club domestic league appearances and goals as of 19 May 2026 ‡ National team caps and goals as of 17 November 2024

Mawouna Kodjo Amevor (born 16 December 1991) is a professional footballer who plays as a centre-back for Eerste Divisie club Volendam. Born in the Netherlands, he represents the Togo national team.

== Club career ==
He made his league debut for FC Dordrecht during the 2010–2011 season and has also played for Go Ahead Eagles, before moving abroad to join English League 2 side Notts County in 2015. He returned to Dordrecht in summer 2016.

In 2018, Amevor signed with Moroccan club Chabab Rif Al Hoceima. He soon left that club and moved to Chonburi in Thailand in November 2018 for the 2019 season. Making no appearances for that club, he signed with Indonesian club Persela Lamongan in late April 2019. Amevor left there in the summer of 2019.

On 20 January 2020, Amevor signed a contract with FC Eindhoven after a successful trial period and made his debut a day later against FC Utrecht in a KNVB Cup match.

On 21 June 2024, Amevor signed a two-year contract with recently relegated Eerste Divisie club Volendam.

== International career ==
He received his first international call with Togo in October 2014.
