= Jan Louwers Stadion =

Football stadium in Eindhoven, Netherlands

Coordinates: 51°24′42″N 5°28′46″E

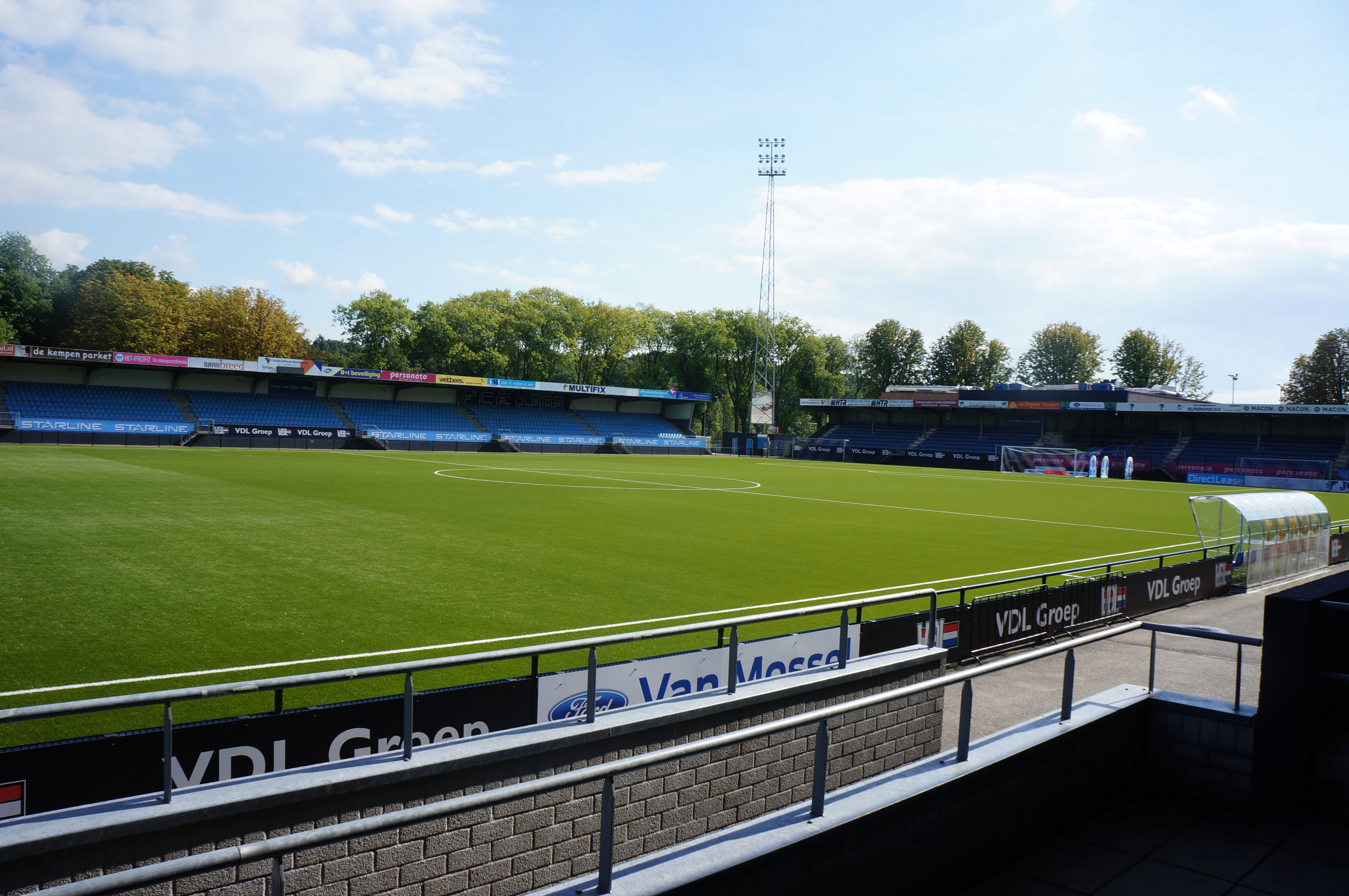
Jan Louwers Stadion

Jan Louwers Stadion (Dutch pronunciation: [jɑn ˈlʌu.ərˌstaːdijɔn]) is a multi-use stadium in the Eindhoven borough of Stratum, Netherlands.

Previously the stadium had a cinder track, with curved, earthen and walled standing grandstands on the north and south sides, so that attendances could still reach up to 18,000 visitors in the 1970s.

It is currently used mostly for football matches and is the home stadium of FC Eindhoven. The stadium is able to hold 4,200 people. The stadium is named after Jan Louwers.

Jong PSV used to use it as their backup stadium.
