= Jasper Dahlhaus =

Dutch footballer (born 2001)

Personal information
- Date of birth: 27 November 2001 (age 24)
- Place of birth: Doetinchem, Netherlands
- Height: 1.76 m (5 ft 9 in)
- Position: Winger

Team information
- Current team: Fortuna Sittard
- Number: 8

Youth career
- 2007–2011: VIOD
- 2011–2020: Vitesse

Senior career*
Years	Team	Apps	(Gls)
2020–2021	Willem II	2	(0)
2020–2021	→ Eindhoven (loan)	13	(1)
2021–2024	Eindhoven	97	(14)
2024–	Fortuna Sittard	57	(2)

International career^{‡}
2019	Netherlands U18	1	(1)
2019	Netherlands U19	1	(0)
- * Club domestic league appearances and goals as of 21 May 2026 ‡ National team caps and goals as of 15 September 2020

Jasper Dahlhaus (born 27 November 2001) is a Dutch professional footballer who plays as a winger for Eredivisie club Fortuna Sittard.

== Club career ==
On 1 February 2021, he joined Eindhoven on loan until the end of the season. On 16 July 2021, he returned to Eindhoven on a permanent basis and signed a two-year contract.

On 30 May 2024, Dahlhaus signed a two-year contract with Fortuna Sittard.

== International career ==
Dahlhaus played once for the Netherlands national under-18 football team and once for the U19s.

== Career statistics ==
=== Club ===
As of 22 December 2024.

Season	Club	League			Cup		Other		Total	
Season	Club	Division	Apps	Goals	Apps	Goals	Apps	Goals	Apps	Goals
2020–21	Willem II	Eredivisie	2	0	0	0	–		2	0
2020–21	Eindhoven	Eerste Divisie	13	1	0	0	–		13	1
2021–22	Eindhoven	Eerste Divisie	34	8	1	1	3	0	38	9
2022–23	Eindhoven	Eerste Divisie	34	5	2	0	2	0	38	5
2023–24	Eindhoven	Eerste Divisie	29	1	0	0	–		29	1
2024–25	Fortuna Sittard	Eredivisie	14	1	2	0	–		16	1
Career total			126	16	5	1	5	0	136	17
