= 2022–23 NAC Breda season =

NAC Breda
2022–23 season
- Owner: City Football Group
- Chairman: Joost Gielen
- Manager: Robert Molenaar (until 27 December); Ton Lokhoff (from 27 December)
- Stadium: Rat Verlegh Stadion
- Eerste Divisie: 11th
- KNVB Cup: Second round

The 2022–23 season is the 110th season in the history of NAC Breda and their fourth consecutive season in the second division of Dutch football. The club are participating in the Eerste Divisie and the KNVB Cup. The season covers the period from 1 July 2022 to 30 June 2023.

== Players ==
As of 12 August 2022

Note: Flags indicate national team as defined under FIFA eligibility rules; some limited exceptions apply. Players may hold more than one non-FIFA nationality.

No.	Pos.	Nation	Player
1	GK	NED	Roy Kortsmit
2	DF	NED	Boyd Lucassen
3	DF	IRL	Anselmo García MacNulty (on loan from VfL Wolfsburg)
4	DF	NED	Danny Bakker
5	DF	GER	Fabio Di Michele Sanchez (on loan from VfL Wolfsburg)
6	MF	NED	Alex Plat
7	FW	CUW	Jarchinio Antonia
8	MF	NED	Ezechiel Banzuzi
9	FW	NED	Jort van der Sande
10	MF	NED	Odysseus Velanas
11	FW	NED	Kaj de Rooij
12	DF	NED	Luc Marijnissen
14	MF	NED	Boris van Schuppen
15	DF	NED	Jethro Mashart
16	MF	NED	Javier Vet
17	FW	NED	Vieiri Kotzebue

No.	Pos.	Nation	Player
18	MF	NED	Sabir Agougil
19	FW	GER	Jesaja Herrmann (on loan from Kortrijk)
20	MF	BEL	Welat Cagro
21	DF	NED	Moreno Rutten
22	DF	NED	Ruben Ligeon
23	DF	NED	Rowan Besselink
24	DF	NED	Tijs Velthuis (on loan from Jong AZ)
25	DF	NED	Stef de Wijs
26	MF	NED	Martijn Brandt
27	FW	NED	Thomas Marijnissen
28	MF	CUW	Michaël Maria
29	FW	LBR	Ayouba Kosiah
30	DF	NED	Omar Mekkaoui
36	GK	NED	Pepijn van de Merbel
37	GK	NED	Aron van Lare

== Transfers ==
=== In ===
No.	Pos	Player	Transferred to	Fee	Date	Source
18	DF	(Republic of Ireland) Anselmo Garcia MacNulty	(Germany) VfL Wolfsburg	Loan	19 July 2022	
49	MF	(Spain) Fabio Di Michele Sanchez	(Germany) VfL Wolfsburg	Loan	19 July 2022	

== Pre-season and friendlies ==
Win Draw Loss Fixtures

15 July 2022 Friendly	NAC Breda (Netherlands)	0–0	(Netherlands) Volendam	Breda
19:00 CEST (UTC+2)				Stadium: Sportpark Tussen de Leyen Veld 2

23 July 2022 Friendly	NAC Breda (Netherlands)	1–0	(Netherlands) FC Eindhoven	Sint Willebrord
17:00 CEST (UTC+2)				Stadium: Sportpark De Gagelrijzen

27 July 2022 Friendly	Feyenoord (Netherlands)	6–1	(Netherlands) NAC Breda	Rotterdam
13:00 CEST (UTC+2)	Wålemark 25'; De Wijs 32' (o.g.); Jahanbakhsh 41'; Bassett 51'; Hartjes 70'; Taabouni 72'		Agougil 81'	Stadium: Sportcomplex Varkenoord

30 July 2022 Friendly	NAC Breda (Netherlands)	2–1	(Belgium) Virton	Breda
19:30 CEST (UTC+2)				Stadium: Rat Verlegh Stadion

== Competitions ==
=== Overall record ===
Competition	First match	Last match	Starting round	Final position	Record							
Competition	First match	Last match	Starting round	Final position	Pld	W	D	L	GF	GA	GD	Win %
Eerste Divisie	5 August 2022	19 May 2023	Matchday 1		36	18	5	13	63	59	+4	50.00
KNVB Cup	19 October 2022	7 February 2023	First round	Round of 16	3	2	0	1	4	3	+1	66.67
Total					39	20	5	14	67	62	+5	51.28

Last updated: 7 May 2023
Source: Soccerway

=== Eerste Divisie ===
==== League table ====
Pos	Team	Pld	W	D	L	GF	GA	GD	Pts	Promotion or qualification
4	Willem II	38	19	11	8	68	40	+28	68	Qualification for promotion play-offs
5	MVV Maastricht	38	18	5	15	65	65	0	59	Qualification for promotion play-offs
6	NAC Breda	38	18	5	15	64	64	0	59	Qualification for promotion play-offs
7	VVV-Venlo	38	16	10	12	56	51	+5	58	Qualification for promotion play-offs
8	Eindhoven	38	16	10	12	58	54	+4	58	Qualification for promotion play-offs

Source: Soccerway, Keuken Kampioen Divisie (in Dutch)
Rules for classification: Season in progress: 1) Most points won; 2) Less points lost; 3) Goal difference; 4) Goals scored; 5) Alphabetical order; End of season: 1) Points; 2) Goal difference; 3) Goals scored; 4) Head-to-head points; 5) Head-to-head goal difference; 6) Head-to-head away goals scored; 7) Play-off if relevant for deciding champion, relegation or participating in a European league, otherwise by draw. 8) Penalty shoot-out (only after a play-off)

==== Results summary ====
Overall								Home						Away					
Pld	W	D	L	GF	GA	GD	Pts	W	D	L	GF	GA	GD	W	D	L	GF	GA	GD
35	17	5	13	61	59	+2	56	10	3	5	34	24	+10	7	2	8	27	35	−8

Last updated: 29 April 2023.
Source: Keuken Kampioen Divisie

==== Results by round ====
Round	1	2	3	4	5	6	7	8	9	10	11	12	13	14	15	16	17	18	19	20	21	22	23	24	25	26	27	28	29	30	31	32	33	34	35	36	37	38
Ground	H	A	H	A	H	A	A	H	H	A	H	A	A	H	A	H	A	H	H	A	A	H	A	H	A	H	A	H	A	H	A	H	A	H	H	A	H	A
Result	W	L	W	W	D	D	L	W	L	L	L	W	L	D	L	L	W	L	W	D	W	W	L	W	L	W	W	W	L	L	W	W	W	D	W			
Position	8	12	8	7	7	7	4	4	8	10	14	10	12	13	14	15	14	14	12	12	11	10	11	11	12	9	9	7	8	8	8	8	8	7	5			

Updated to match(es) played on 29 April 2023. Source: Keuken Kampioen Divisie
A = Away; H = Home; W = Win; D = Draw; L = Loss

==== Matches ====
The league fixtures were announced on 17 June 2022.

5 August 2022 1	NAC Breda	1–0	Helmond Sport	Breda
20:00 CEST	de Rooij (yellow card) 8' (yellow-red card) 83'; Velthuis (yellow card) 41'; Velanas 53'	Report	Goselink (yellow card) 24'; van Ooijen (yellow card) 37'	Stadium: Rat Verlegh Stadion; Attendance: 14,824; Referee: (Netherlands) Erwin Blank

15 August 2022 2	MVV	3–1	NAC Breda	Maastricht
20:00 CEST	Kostons 9' (yellow card) 45'; Remans 12' (pen.); Zeegers (yellow card) 47'; van Bommel 66'	Report	Velthuis (yellow card) 11'; Plat (yellow card) 30'; van der Sande 71'	Stadium: De Geusselt; Attendance: 4,007; Referee: (Netherlands) Martijn Vos

19 August 2022 3	NAC Breda	1–0	TOP Oss	Breda
20:00 CEST	Velanas 28'	Report	Piqué (yellow card) 84'; Mathieu (yellow card) 86'	Stadium: Rat Verlegh Stadion; Attendance: 15,021; Referee: (Netherlands) Sander van der Eijk

26 August 2022 4	Roda JC	1–3	NAC Breda	Kerkrade
20:00 CEST	Douglas (yellow card) 21'; Vossebelt (yellow card) 76'; Limbombe (yellow card) 85'; Joppen 90+2'	Report	de Rooij 26'; Kortsmit (yellow card) 39'; Banzuzi (yellow card) 45+1'; van der Sande 48'; MacNulty (yellow card) 56'; Velanas (yellow card) 72' (goal) 90+3'; Agougil (yellow card) 85'	Stadium: Parkstad Limburg Stadion; Attendance: 8,583; Referee: (Netherlands) Serdar Gözübüyük

2 September 2022 5	NAC Breda	1–1	FC Eindhoven	Breda
20:00 CEST	Velanas 4'; Di Michele Sanchez (yellow card) 79'	Report	van Doorm (yellow card) 37'; Kökçü 42' (yellow card) 55'; Bannis (yellow card) 54'; Pieter Bogaers (yellow card) 69'; Oostenbrink (yellow card) 82'	Stadium: Rat Verlegh Stadion; Attendance: 17,824; Referee: (Netherlands) Ingmar Oostrom

9 September 2022 6	De Graafschap	1–1	NAC Breda	Doetinchem
20:00 CEST	Gravenberch 87'	Report	de Rooij 38' (yellow card) 85'; Lucassen (yellow card) 78'	Stadium: De Vijverberg; Attendance: 10,154; Referee: (Netherlands) Allard Lindhout

12 September 2022 8	Jong Ajax	3–1	NAC Breda	Amsterdam
20:00 CEST	Kik Pierie 48' (yellow card) 83'; Misehouy 59'; Milovanović (yellow card) 69'; Hansen (red card) 74'; Giovanni Manson 81'	Report	van der Sande 23'; Banzuzi (yellow card) 73'; Agougil (red card) 74'; Vet (yellow card) 90+6'	Stadium: Sportpark De Toekomst; Attendance: 1,422; Referee: (Netherlands) Jannick van der Laan

16 September 2022 7	NAC Breda	3–1	Jong FC Utrecht	Breda
20:00 CEST	Vet 13' (yellow card) 33'; Lucassen 56'; Velanas 58' (yellow card) 63'	Report	Albert Lottin 7'; Mamengi (yellow card) 17'; Sanches Fernandes (yellow card) 19'; Arthur Zagré (yellow card) 26'	Stadium: Rat Verlegh Stadion; Attendance: 15,624; Referee: (Netherlands) Laurens Gerrets

30 September 2022 9	NAC Breda	1–2	VVV	Breda
20:00 CEST	Di Michele Sanchez (yellow card) 38'; Lucassen (yellow card) 40' (goal) 69'	Report	Ketting (yellow card) 50'; Huisman 52'; Johansson 78'; van Rooijen (yellow card) 90'	Stadium: Rat Verlegh Stadion; Attendance: 18,297; Referee: (Netherlands) Jochem Kamphuis

7 October 2022 10	Jong AZ	4–0	NAC Breda	Zaandam
20:00 CEST	Yusuf Barasi 18'; Stam (yellow card) 36'; Soulyman Allouch 51'; Goes (yellow card) 52'; Griffith 60'; Meerdink 87'	Report	van der Sande (yellow card) 52'; Herrmann (yellow card) 63'; Velanas (yellow card) 78'	Stadium: Sportcomplex Kalverhoek; Attendance: 550; Referee: (Netherlands) Jesse Rozendal

14 October 2022 11	NAC Breda	1–2	ADO Den Haag	Breda
20:00 CEST	van der Sande 3' (yellow card) 36'; MacNulty (yellow card) 9'; Banzuzi (yellow card) 89'	Report	Verheydt 13' 32'; Ćatić (yellow card) 33'; Hall (yellow card) 55'; Siereveld (yellow card) 61'; Absalem (yellow card) 67'; Esajas (yellow card) 71'	Stadium: Rat Verlegh Stadion; Attendance: 17,832; Referee: (Netherlands) Edwin van de Graaf

22 October 2022 12	Dordrecht	0–3	NAC Breda	Dordrecht
20:00 CEST	Bossin (yellow card) 68'	Report	Kortsmit (yellow card) 33'; de Wijs (yellow card) 34'; Banzuzi 45+1'; van der Sande 67' 78'	Stadium: Matchoholic Stadion; Attendance: 2,082; Referee: (Netherlands) Stan Teuben

28 October 2022 13	Den Bosch	3–2	NAC Breda	's-Hertogenbosch
20:00 CEST	Hammouti 10'; Verbeek 57' (yellow card) 85'; Konings 73'	Report	Marijnissen 74'; van der Sande 84'	Stadium: De Vliert; Attendance: 4,953; Referee: (Netherlands) Bas Nijhuis

4 November 2022 14	NAC Breda	1–1	Telstar	Breda
20:00 CET	Vieiri Kotzebue 21'; Marijnissen (yellow card) 55'; Plat (yellow card) 58'; Agougil (yellow card) 82'	Report	Apau 23'; Aktaş (yellow card) 30'; Blackson (yellow card) 90+2'	Stadium: Rat Verlegh Stadion; Attendance: 16,058; Referee: (Netherlands) Laurens Gerrets

11 November 2022 15	Heracles Almelo	5–1	NAC Breda	Almelo
20:00 CET	Bruns 16'; Roosken 30'; Laursen 42' 70'; Sonnenberg (yellow card) 64'; Hansson 74'	Report	Velanas 9'	Stadium: Erve Asito; Attendance: 11,102; Referee: (Netherlands) Dennis Higler

19 November 2022 16	NAC Breda	0–2	PEC Zwolle	Breda
21:00 CET	MacNulty (yellow card) 90+1'	Report	Taha 32' 45'; Kersten (yellow card) 61'	Stadium: Rat Verlegh Stadion; Attendance: 15,251; Referee: (Netherlands) Erwin Blank

11 December 2022 17	Willem II	1–2	NAC Breda	Tilburg
12:15 CET	Bokila 9' (pen.); Svensson (yellow card) 41'; Verreth (yellow card) 56'; Hornkamp (yellow card) 86'	Report	Ligeon 47'; Antonia 52'; Velanas (yellow card) 86'	Stadium: Koning Willem II Stadion; Attendance: 14,300; Referee: (Netherlands) Serdar Gözübüyük

16 December 2022 18	NAC Breda	0–1	Almere City	Breda
20:00 CET		Report	Hilterman 22'; Post (yellow card) 40'; Poll (yellow card) 56'; Barbet (yellow card) 83'; Pouwels (yellow card) 90+3'	Stadium: Rat Verlegh Stadion; Attendance: 15,272; Referee: (Netherlands) Rob Dieperink

6 January 2023 19	NAC Breda	2–1	Jong PSV	Breda
20:00 CET	Velanas 4'; van der Sande 32'; Kortsmit (yellow card) 90+2'	Report	Jason van Duiven 2'; Nassoh (yellow card) 71'; Antonisse (yellow card) 90+2'	Stadium: Rat Verlegh Stadion; Attendance: 16,282; Referee: (Netherlands) Stan Teuben

13 January 2023 20	Helmond Sport	2–2	NAC Breda	Helmond
20:00 CET	Maddy 28'; Kaars 55'	Report	van der Sande 16'; Velanas 56'	Stadium: GS Staalwerken Stadion; Attendance: 1,733; Referee: (Netherlands) Richard Wilhelmus Martens

=== KNVB Cup ===
19 October 2022 First Round	USV Hercules	0–1	NAC Breda	Utrecht
20:00	Tim Waterink (yellow card) 86'	Report	Velthuis (yellow card) 59'; Velanas 90+4'	Stadium: Sportpark Voordorp; Referee: (Netherlands) Clay Ruperti
