= 2022–23 Eerste Divisie =

67th season of the second-tier football league in Netherlands

Eerste Divisie
- Season: 2022 – 2023
- Dates: August 2022 – May 2023
- Champions: Heracles Almelo
- Promoted: Heracles Almelo; PEC Zwolle; Almere City
- Matches: 380
- Goals: 1,166 (3.07 per match)
- Top goalscorer: Lennart Thy (23 goals)
- Biggest home win: PEC Zwolle 13–0 Den Bosch (3 March 2023)
- Biggest away win: Telstar 0–5 PEC Zwolle (12 August 2022); TOP Oss 0–5 PEC Zwolle (4 November 2022); TOP Oss 0–5 Almere City (28 April 2023)
- Highest scoring: PEC Zwolle 13–0 Den Bosch (3 March 2023)
- Longest winning run: 9 matches PEC Zwolle
- Longest unbeaten run: 11 matches PEC Zwolle
- Longest winless run: 10 matches Jong Ajax
- Longest losing run: 6 matches Dordrecht; Jong FC Utrecht

The 2022–23 Eerste Divisie, known as Keuken Kampioen Divisie for sponsorship reasons, is the 67th season of Eerste Divisie since its establishment in 1956.

== Teams ==
A total of 20 teams will take part in the league: 17 teams from the 2021–22 Eerste Divisie and 3 teams relegated from the 2021–22 Eredivisie.

Location of teams in the Eerste Divisie 2022–23

=== Stadiums and locations ===
Club	Location	Venue	Capacity
ADO Den Haag	The Hague	Bingoal Stadion	15,000
Almere City	Almere	Yanmar Stadion	4,501
Den Bosch	's-Hertogenbosch	Stadion De Vliert	8,713
Dordrecht	Dordrecht	Matchoholic Stadion	4,235
Eindhoven	Eindhoven	Jan Louwers Stadion	4,600
De Graafschap	Doetinchem	Stadion De Vijverberg	12,600
Helmond Sport	Helmond	GS Staalwerken Stadion	4,100
Heracles Almelo	Almelo	Erve Asito	12,080
Jong Ajax	Amsterdam	Sportpark De Toekomst	2,050
Jong AZ	Wijdewormer	AFAS Trainingscomplex	1,000
Jong PSV	Eindhoven	PSV Campus De Herdgang	2,500
Jong FC Utrecht	Utrecht	Sportcomplex Zoudenbalch	550
MVV Maastricht	Maastricht	Stadion De Geusselt	10,000
NAC Breda	Breda	Rat Verlegh Stadion	19,000
PEC Zwolle	Zwolle	MAC³PARK stadion	14,000
Roda JC Kerkrade	Kerkrade	Parkstad Limburg Stadion	19,979
Telstar	Velsen	BUKO Stadion	3,060
TOP Oss	Oss	Frans Heesenstadion	4,560
VVV-Venlo	Venlo	Covebo Stadion - De Koel	8,000
Willem II	Tilburg	Koning Willem II Stadion	14,500

=== Number of teams by provinces ===
Number of teams	Province	Team(s)
7	North Brabant	Den Bosch, Eindhoven, Helmond Sport, Jong PSV, NAC Breda, TOP Oss, Willem II
3	Limburg	MVV Maastricht, Roda JC Kerkrade, VVV-Venlo
3	North Holland	Jong Ajax, Jong AZ, Telstar
2	Overijssel	Heracles Almelo, PEC Zwolle
2	South Holland	ADO Den Haag, Dordrecht
1	Flevoland	Almere City
1	Gelderland	De Graafschap
1	Utrecht	Jong FC Utrecht

=== Personnel ===
Note: Flags indicate national team as has been defined under FIFA eligibility rules. Players and Managers may hold more than one non-FIFA nationality.

Team	Manager	Captain	Shirt sponsor
ADO Den Haag	(Netherlands) Dick Advocaat	(Netherlands) Boy Kemper	Hommerson Casino
Almere City	(Netherlands) Alex Pastoor	(Netherlands) Tim Receveur	SenS Online Solutions
Den Bosch	(Poland) Tomasz Kaczmarek	(Netherlands) Wouter van der Steen	D-Reizen
Dordrecht	(Italy) Michele Santoni	(Netherlands) Jari Schuurman	Keukenwarenhuis.nl
Eindhoven	(Netherlands) Rob Penders	(Togo) Mawouna Amevor	VDL Groep
De Graafschap	(Netherlands) Richard Roelofsen (a.i.)	(Netherlands) Ted van de Pavert	AgriBioSource
Helmond Sport	(Belgium) Bob Peeters	(Netherlands) Robin van der Meer	Vescom
Heracles Almelo	(Netherlands) John Lammers	(Netherlands) Justin Hoogma	Asito
Jong Ajax	(Netherlands) Dave Vos	(Netherlands) Youri Regeer	Ziggo
Jong AZ	(Belgium) Maarten Martens	(Netherlands) Joey Jacobs	Kansino
Jong PSV	(Morocco) Adil Ramzi	(Curaçao) Shurandy Sambo	Metropoolregio Brainport Eindhoven
Jong FC Utrecht	(Bosnia and Herzegovina) Darije Kalezić	(Netherlands) Yuya Ikeshita	T-Mobile
MVV Maastricht	(Netherlands) Maurice Verberne	(Netherlands) Sven Blummel	SuperGame
NAC Breda	(Germany) Peter Hyballa	(Netherlands) Alex Plat	OK tankstations
PEC Zwolle	(Netherlands) Dick Schreuder	(Netherlands) Bram van Polen	VDK Groep
Roda JC Kerkrade	(Netherlands) Remond Strijbosch (a.i.)	(Finland) Richard Jensen	Flow Traders Foundation
Telstar	(Netherlands) Mike Snoei	(Netherlands) Glynor Plet	BUKO
TOP Oss	(Netherlands) Klaas Wels	(Netherlands) Rick Stuy van den Herik	Hendriks Bouw en Ontwikkeling
VVV-Venlo	(Netherlands) Rick Kruys	(Netherlands) Sven Braken	Seacon
Willem II	(Netherlands) Reinier Robbemond	(Spain) Pol Llonch	DESTIL

=== Managerial changes ===
Team	Outgoing manager	Manner of departure	Date of vacancy	Position in table	Replaced by	Date of appointment	Ref.
ADO Den Haag	(Netherlands) Giovanni Franken	End of contract	30 June 2022	Pre-season	(Netherlands) Dirk Kuyt	1 July 2022	
De Graafschap	(Netherlands) Jan Vreman	End of interim spell	30 June 2022	Pre-season	(Netherlands) Adrie Poldervaart	1 July 2022	
Heracles Almelo	(Netherlands) René Kolmschot	End of interim spell	30 June 2022	Pre-season	(Netherlands) John Lammers	1 July 2022	
Jong PSV	(Netherlands) Ruud van Nistelrooy	Signed by PSV Eindhoven	30 June 2022	Pre-season	(Morocco) Adil Ramzi	1 July 2022	
NAC Breda	(Netherlands) Edwin de Graaf	End of contract	30 June 2022	Pre-season	(Netherlands) Robert Molenaar	1 July 2022	
Telstar	(Netherlands) Andries Jonker	End of contract	30 June 2022	Pre-season	(Netherlands) Mike Snoei	1 July 2022	
TOP Oss	(Belgium) Bob Peeters	End of contract	30 June 2022	Pre-season	(Belgium) Kristof Aelbrecht	1 July 2022	
VVV-Venlo	(Netherlands) Jos Luhukay	Mutual consent	30 June 2022	Pre-season	(Netherlands) Rick Kruys	1 July 2022	
Helmond Sport	(Belgium) Sven Swinnen	Mutual consent	25 October 2022	19th	(Netherlands) Tim Bakens (a.i.)	25 October 2022	
ADO Den Haag	(Netherlands) Dirk Kuyt	Sacked	24 November 2022	17th	(Netherlands) Dick Advocaat	28 November 2022	
Willem II	(Netherlands) Kevin Hofland	Sacked	12 December 2022	8th	(Netherlands) Reinier Robbemond	12 December 2022	
Roda JC Kerkrade	(Netherlands) Jurgen Streppel	Signed by Helmond Sport	15 December 2022	9th	(Netherlands) Remond Strijbosch (a.i.)	16 December 2022	
Helmond Sport	(Netherlands) Tim Bakens (a.i.)	End of interim spell	23 December 2022	17th	(Belgium) Bob Peeters	23 December 2022	
TOP Oss	(Belgium) Kristof Aelbrecht	Sacked	23 December 2022	19th	(Netherlands) Marcel van der Sloot (a.i.)	23 December 2022	
NAC Breda	(Netherlands) Robert Molenaar	Sacked	27 December 2022	14th	(Netherlands) Ton Lokhoff (a.i.)	27 December 2022	
Jong Ajax	(Netherlands) John Heitinga	Signed by Ajax	27 January 2023	15th	(Netherlands) Dave Vos	15 February 2023	
NAC Breda	(Netherlands) Ton Lokhoff (a.i.)	End of interim spell	18 January 2023	12th	(Germany) Peter Hyballa	21 January 2023	
De Graafschap	(Netherlands) Adrie Poldervaart	Health issues	6 February 2023	14th	(Netherlands) Richard Roelofsen (a.i.)	6 February 2023	
TOP Oss	(Netherlands) Marcel van der Sloot (a.i.)	End of interim spell	8 February 2023	19th	(Netherlands) Klaas Wels	8 February 2023	
Den Bosch	(Netherlands) Jack de Gier	Sacked	6 March 2023	18th	(Netherlands) William van Overbeek (a.i.)	6 March 2023	
Den Bosch	(Netherlands) William van Overbeek (a.i.)	End of interim spell	10 April 2023	19th	(Poland) Tomasz Kaczmarek	10 April 2023	

== Standings ==
=== League table ===
Pos	Team	Pld	W	D	L	GF	GA	GD	Pts	Promotion or qualification
1	Heracles Almelo (Note: Winner of the First and Fourth Period (Rounds 1–10 and 29–38)) (C, P)	38	27	4	7	103	42	+61	85	Promotion to the Eredivisie
2	PEC Zwolle (Note: Winner of the Second Period (Rounds 11–19)) (P)	38	27	4	7	99	43	+56	85	Promotion to the Eredivisie
3	Almere City (Note: Winner of the Third Period (Rounds 20–28)) (O, P)	38	21	7	10	58	41	+17	70	Qualification for promotion play-offs
4	Willem II	38	19	11	8	68	40	+28	68	Qualification for promotion play-offs
5	MVV Maastricht	38	18	5	15	65	65	0	59	Qualification for promotion play-offs
6	NAC Breda	38	18	5	15	64	64	0	59	Qualification for promotion play-offs
7	VVV-Venlo	38	16	10	12	56	51	+5	58	Qualification for promotion play-offs
8	Eindhoven	38	16	10	12	58	54	+4	58	Qualification for promotion play-offs
9	Telstar	38	14	11	13	39	52	−13	53	
10	De Graafschap	38	15	7	16	64	54	+10	52	
11	Jong AZ	38	14	9	15	60	58	+2	51	Reserve teams are not eligible to be promoted to the Eredivisie
12	ADO Den Haag	38	13	12	13	51	57	−6	51	
13	Jong Ajax	38	12	10	16	69	72	−3	46	Reserve teams are not eligible to be promoted to the Eredivisie
14	Jong PSV	38	12	9	17	59	63	−4	45	Reserve teams are not eligible to be promoted to the Eredivisie
15	Roda JC Kerkrade	38	12	7	19	49	59	−10	43	
16	Helmond Sport	38	11	10	17	39	57	−18	43	
17	TOP Oss	38	10	7	21	45	76	−31	37	
18	Dordrecht	38	9	8	21	41	68	−27	35	
19	Den Bosch	38	10	5	23	46	85	−39	35	
20	Jong FC Utrecht	38	7	7	24	33	65	−32	28	Reserve teams are not eligible to be promoted to the Eredivisie

Source: Soccerway, Keuken Kampioen Divisie (in Dutch)
Rules for classification: Season in progress: 1) Most points won; 2) Less points lost; 3) Goal difference; 4) Goals scored; 5) Alphabetical order; End of season: 1) Points; 2) Goal difference; 3) Goals scored; 4) Head-to-head points; 5) Head-to-head goal difference; 6) Head-to-head away goals scored; 7) Play-off if relevant for deciding champion, relegation or participating in a European league, otherwise by draw. 8) Penalty shoot-out (only after a play-off)
(C) Champions; (O) Play-off winners; (P) Promoted

== Period tables ==
=== Period 1 ===
Pos	Team	Pld	W	D	L	GF	GA	GD	Pts	Qualification
1	Heracles Almelo	10	8	1	1	27	12	+15	25	Qualification for promotion play-offs
2	PEC Zwolle	10	6	2	2	24	14	+10	20	
3	MVV Maastricht	10	6	2	2	20	17	+3	20	
4	Eindhoven	10	5	4	1	18	9	+9	19	
5	Roda JC Kerkrade	10	5	3	2	20	13	+7	18	
6	VVV-Venlo	10	5	2	3	17	19	−2	17	
7	Jong AZ	10	5	1	4	20	14	+6	16	Reserves teams cannot participate in the promotion play-offs
8	Almere City	10	5	1	4	14	13	+1	16	
9	Willem II	10	4	3	3	14	12	+2	15	
10	NAC Breda	10	4	2	4	13	16	−3	14	
11	Jong Ajax	10	3	3	4	16	15	+1	12	Reserves teams cannot participate in the promotion play-offs
12	Jong PSV	10	3	3	4	12	17	−5	12	Reserves teams cannot participate in the promotion play-offs
13	Telstar	10	3	3	4	10	16	−6	12	
14	Dordrecht	10	3	2	5	12	14	−2	11	
15	ADO Den Haag	10	3	2	5	12	17	−5	11	
16	TOP Oss	10	3	1	6	12	16	−4	10	
17	Helmond Sport	10	3	0	7	9	14	−5	9	
18	Den Bosch	10	3	0	7	13	19	−6	9	
19	De Graafschap	10	2	2	6	13	19	−6	8	
20	Jong FC Utrecht	10	1	3	6	8	18	−10	6	Reserves teams cannot participate in the promotion play-offs

Source: Keuken Kampioen Divisie (in Dutch)
Rules for classification: 1) points; 2) goal difference; 3) number of goals scored

=== Period 2 ===
Pos	Team	Pld	W	D	L	GF	GA	GD	Pts	Qualification
1	PEC Zwolle	9	8	0	1	22	8	+14	24	Qualification for promotion play-offs
2	Heracles Almelo	9	6	1	2	29	11	+18	19	Period 1 winner
3	Almere City	9	5	1	3	16	12	+4	16	
4	Willem II	9	4	3	2	14	9	+5	15	
5	VVV-Venlo	9	4	3	2	12	8	+4	15	
6	Jong AZ	9	4	3	2	13	10	+3	15	Reserves teams cannot participate in the promotion play-offs
7	MVV Maastricht	9	4	2	3	16	14	+2	14	
8	De Graafschap	9	4	2	3	15	13	+2	14	
9	Eindhoven	9	4	2	3	13	15	−2	14	
10	Telstar	9	3	4	2	12	12	0	13	
11	Jong PSV	9	3	3	3	19	14	+5	12	Reserves teams cannot participate in the promotion play-offs
12	Jong Ajax	9	2	5	2	18	18	0	11	Reserves teams cannot participate in the promotion play-offs
13	Den Bosch	9	3	1	5	14	18	−4	10	
14	NAC Breda	9	3	1	5	12	16	−4	10	
15	Helmond Sport	9	3	1	5	6	18	−12	10	
16	Jong FC Utrecht	9	3	0	6	11	14	−3	9	Reserves teams cannot participate in the promotion play-offs
17	ADO Den Haag	9	2	3	4	9	13	−4	9	
18	Dordrecht	9	2	2	5	11	22	−11	8	
19	TOP Oss	9	2	1	6	7	17	−10	7	
20	Roda JC Kerkrade	9	2	0	7	8	15	−7	6	

Source: Keuken Kampioen Divisie (in Dutch)
Rules for classification: 1) points; 2) goal difference; 3) number of goals scored

=== Period 3 ===
Pos	Team	Pld	W	D	L	GF	GA	GD	Pts	Qualification
1	Almere City	9	6	2	1	10	4	+6	20	Qualification for promotion play-offs
2	PEC Zwolle	9	6	1	2	32	10	+22	19	Period 2 winner
3	NAC Breda	9	6	1	2	22	14	+8	19	
4	ADO Den Haag	9	5	3	1	13	10	+3	18	
5	De Graafschap	9	5	2	2	18	6	+12	17	
6	Heracles Almelo	9	5	1	3	22	9	+13	16	Period 1 winner
7	VVV-Venlo	9	5	1	3	15	10	+5	16	
8	Willem II	9	4	2	3	18	12	+6	14	
9	Telstar	9	4	2	3	6	11	−5	14	
10	Helmond Sport	9	3	4	2	11	11	0	13	
11	Roda JC Kerkrade	9	4	1	4	10	11	−1	13	
12	TOP Oss	9	4	1	4	14	16	−2	13	
13	Eindhoven	9	4	0	5	11	16	−5	12	
14	Jong AZ	9	2	3	4	15	22	−7	9	Reserves teams cannot participate in the promotion play-offs
15	Jong PSV	9	2	2	5	12	17	−5	8	Reserves teams cannot participate in the promotion play-offs
16	Den Bosch	9	2	2	5	10	32	−22	8	
17	Dordrecht	9	2	1	6	8	12	−4	7	
18	MVV Maastricht	9	2	1	6	16	21	−5	7	
19	Jong FC Utrecht	9	1	2	6	8	17	−9	5	Reserves teams cannot participate in the promotion play-offs
20	Jong Ajax	9	1	2	6	11	21	−10	5	Reserves teams cannot participate in the promotion play-offs

Source: Keuken Kampioen Divisie (in Dutch)
Rules for classification: 1) points; 2) goal difference; 3) number of goals scored

=== Period 4 ===
Pos	Team	Pld	W	D	L	GF	GA	GD	Pts	Qualification
1	Heracles Almelo	10	8	1	1	25	10	+15	25	Period 1 winner
2	Willem II	10	7	3	0	22	7	+15	24	Qualification for promotion play-offs
3	PEC Zwolle	10	7	1	2	21	11	+10	22	Period 2 winner
4	Jong Ajax	10	6	0	4	24	18	+6	18	Reserves teams cannot participate in the promotion play-offs
5	Almere City	10	5	3	2	18	12	+6	18	Period 3 winner
6	MVV Maastricht	10	6	0	4	13	13	0	18	
7	NAC Breda	10	5	1	4	17	18	−1	16	
8	Telstar	10	4	2	4	11	13	−2	14	
9	De Graafschap	10	4	1	5	18	16	+2	13	
10	Eindhoven	10	3	4	3	16	14	+2	13	
11	Jong PSV	10	4	1	5	16	15	+1	13	Reserves teams cannot participate in the promotion play-offs
12	ADO Den Haag	10	3	4	3	17	17	0	13	
13	Jong AZ	10	3	2	5	12	12	0	11	Reserves teams cannot participate in the promotion play-offs
14	Helmond Sport	10	2	5	3	13	14	−1	11	
15	VVV-Venlo	10	2	4	4	12	14	−2	10	
16	Dordrecht	10	2	3	5	10	20	−10	9	
17	Den Bosch	10	2	2	6	9	16	−7	8	
18	Jong FC Utrecht	10	2	2	6	6	16	−10	8	Reserves teams cannot participate in the promotion play-offs
19	TOP Oss	10	1	4	5	12	27	−15	7	
20	Roda JC Kerkrade	10	1	3	6	11	20	−9	6	

Source: Keuken Kampioen Divisie (in Dutch)
Rules for classification: 1) points; 2) goal difference; 3) number of goals scored

== Results ==
=== Fixtures and results ===
Home \ Away	ADO	ALM	DBO	DOR	EIN	GRA	HEL	HER	JAJ	JAZ	JPS	JUT	MVV	NAC	PEC	RJC	TEL	TOP	VVV	WIL
ADO Den Haag		2–3	0–2	2–2	1–0	2–2	2–2	0–3	4–0	2–2	1–3	1–1	2–1	2–1	3–1	0–1	3–1	0–0	2–3	1–3
Almere City	4–1		2–0	2–1	1–1	2–2	0–0	3–2	2–3	2–1	1–2	1–0	1–0	0–2	1–1	2–1	0–1	3–0	1–3	1–0
Den Bosch	0–0	2–2		3–1	1–3	2–1	1–2	1–2	4–2	3–0	1–0	1–4	3–3	3–2	1–2	0–3	0–1	4–1	0–2	0–2
Dordrecht	0–1	0–1	2–1		4–0	0–4	0–0	1–3	3–4	1–0	1–0	2–1	1–2	0–3	3–0	0–2	0–0	2–2	1–2	2–2
Eindhoven	1–1	0–1	4–1	1–1		0–4	0–1	1–0	5–1	1–0	2–2	2–0	5–0	1–2	4–2	3–3	3–0	2–1	0–2	2–1
De Graafschap	0–1	1–2	3–0	1–1	1–2		2–0	5–3	3–0	2–0	3–2	2–0	2–1	1–1	0–1	2–0	0–1	2–0	1–2	0–3
Helmond Sport	2–1	3–0	1–0	2–1	0–1	0–2		0–1	1–1	1–3	3–0	2–0	1–2	2–2	2–3	1–0	2–2	1–2	1–1	1–3
Heracles Almelo	4–0	1–1	3–2	8–1	3–0	3–2	2–0		2–0	2–0	3–0	6–1	2–2	5–1	0–3	1–0	7–0	3–0	5–3	1–1
Jong Ajax	4–2	0–2	4–4	4–1	1–1	5–1	0–1	4–0		1–2	5–4	1–2	4–2	3–1	0–0	1–2	1–1	1–2	1–1	1–2
Jong AZ	0–2	3–2	3–1	3–1	1–1	0–1	1–1	1–1	1–1		2–3	4–0	3–1	4–0	2–3	2–0	0–0	1–1	4–3	2–2
Jong PSV	1–2	0–1	3–1	1–0	1–1	2–1	6–0	0–3	2–2	3–3		2–1	0–1	1–2	3–1	5–1	0–2	0–3	1–2	3–2
Jong FC Utrecht	1–1	0–2	0–0	0–1	0–1	1–1	2–0	0–3	1–0	0–2	0–1		3–0	4–1	0–1	1–3	0–1	4–2	1–1	0–0
MVV Maastricht	3–1	1–0	3–1	2–1	3–2	2–2	4–0	0–2	4–1	1–3	1–1	1–0		3–1	3–2	1–1	2–1	5–1	0–1	3–2
NAC Breda	1–2	0–1	2–0	3–2	1–1	2–0	1–0	0–3	2–6	5–1	2–1	3–1	4–1		0–2	4–2	1–1	1–0	1–2	1–1
PEC Zwolle	1–2	3–2	13–0	4–0	5–2	2–1	1–0	3–2	1–1	4–1	4–2	2–0	0–1	2–0		3–1	2–0	4–1	2–0	2–2
Roda JC Kerkrade	1–1	0–2	0–1	1–0	1–2	3–2	0–1	1–3	1–0	2–0	1–1	4–1	2–1	1–3	1–2		1–2	1–1	4–1	2–2
Telstar	0–0	0–1	1–0	2–2	0–1	0–1	2–1	0–3	2–3	1–0	1–1	2–2	5–3	2–1	0–5	2–1		1–0	1–0	0–0
TOP Oss	2–3	0–5	3–0	0–1	2–0	3–3	2–2	1–5	1–1	1–3	1–0	3–0	0–1	1–2	0–5	3–0	2–1		1–2	1–3
VVV-Venlo	0–0	3–0	4–0	0–1	2–2	2–1	1–1	3–1	0–1	1–2	1–1	2–1	2–1	1–3	0–4	1–1	1–1	0–1		0–0
Willem II	1–0	1–1	1–2	1–0	3–0	3–2	5–1	1–2	2–1	1–0	1–1	3–0	2–0	1–2	2–3	1–0	2–1	4–0	2–1	

Source: Soccerway, Keuken Kampioen Divisie (in Dutch)
Legend: Blue = home team win; Yellow = draw; Red = away team win.

=== Results by round ===
Team ╲ Round	1	2	3	4	5	6	7	8	9	10	11	12	13	14	15	16	17	18	19	20	21	22	23	24	25	26	27	28	29	30	31	32	33	34	35	36	37	38
ADO Den Haag	L	L	L	W	L	D	D	W	L	W	W	D	L	L	D	L	L	D	W	W	D	D	W	W	W	D	L	W	L	D	W	D	L	W	D	L	D	W
Almere City	L	W	L	W	L	L	D	W	W	W	L	D	W	W	W	L	W	W	L	W	D	W	L	W	D	W	W	W	W	L	D	W	W	D	W	L	D	W
Den Bosch	L	W	L	L	L	L	L	W	L	W	W	L	W	W	D	L	L	L	L	L	W	D	L	W	L	D	L	L	W	L	L	L	L	W	L	D	D	L
Dordrecht	L	L	W	D	L	W	L	L	D	W	W	L	D	L	L	D	W	L	L	W	D	L	W	L	L	L	L	L	L	D	L	W	L	W	L	L	D	D
Eindhoven	W	W	W	W	D	W	D	D	D	L	W	L	D	W	L	W	W	L	D	W	L	W	L	L	L	L	W	W	D	D	L	W	D	L	W	W	L	D
De Graafschap	L	L	L	D	W	D	L	L	W	L	W	D	W	L	W	W	L	L	D	W	D	D	L	L	W	W	W	W	L	L	W	W	D	L	L	W	L	W
Helmond Sport	L	L	L	L	W	L	L	W	L	W	L	L	W	L	W	L	L	W	D	D	D	D	L	W	D	W	L	W	D	D	D	L	W	L	D	D	W	L
Heracles Almelo	W	W	W	D	L	W	W	W	W	W	L	W	L	W	W	W	W	W	D	L	W	L	W	L	D	W	W	W	W	W	D	L	W	W	W	W	W	W
Jong Ajax	D	L	W	L	W	D	W	L	D	L	W	D	L	W	D	D	L	D	D	L	L	D	D	L	W	L	L	L	L	W	W	W	W	L	W	W	L	L
Jong AZ	W	W	W	L	W	D	L	L	L	W	L	D	W	W	W	D	L	W	D	L	D	L	W	L	W	D	D	L	D	L	L	L	W	L	W	D	W	L
Jong PSV	D	W	L	L	L	D	W	D	W	L	D	W	D	L	L	W	W	D	L	L	L	W	W	L	D	D	L	L	W	W	W	L	L	L	L	W	L	D
Jong FC Utrecht	L	L	L	D	L	W	D	L	D	L	L	L	L	L	W	L	W	L	W	L	D	D	L	L	W	L	L	L	L	L	L	W	L	W	L	D	L	D
MVV Maastricht	L	W	W	D	D	L	W	W	W	W	D	W	W	W	L	W	L	L	D	L	L	D	L	W	L	W	L	L	W	L	W	W	W	W	L	L	W	L
NAC Breda	W	L	W	W	D	D	L	W	L	L	L	W	L	D	L	L	W	L	W	D	W	W	L	W	L	W	W	W	L	L	W	W	D	W	W	W	L	L
PEC Zwolle	W	W	W	W	W	D	W	L	D	L	W	W	L	W	W	W	W	W	W	W	W	W	D	W	L	L	W	W	W	W	W	L	W	D	W	L	W	W
Roda JC Kerkrade	W	W	W	L	D	D	W	D	L	W	L	L	W	L	L	W	L	L	L	D	W	W	W	L	L	L	W	L	D	W	L	D	L	L	L	L	L	D
Telstar	D	L	L	W	L	W	D	L	D	W	W	D	D	D	D	L	W	W	L	W	D	L	W	W	D	L	L	W	D	W	L	L	L	W	W	D	L	W
TOP Oss	W	L	L	L	W	D	L	L	W	L	L	W	L	L	L	L	L	D	W	D	L	L	W	L	W	W	W	L	L	L	D	L	D	L	L	D	W	D
VVV-Venlo	W	W	L	W	W	L	D	D	W	L	L	D	L	W	D	W	W	W	D	W	L	D	L	W	W	L	W	W	D	W	L	L	D	L	L	D	W	D
Willem II	D	L	W	D	W	D	W	W	L	L	W	D	W	L	D	D	L	W	W	L	W	L	W	W	D	W	D	L	W	W	W	W	D	W	W	D	W	D

Source: Flashscore

== Play-offs ==
=== Promotion/relegation play-offs ===
==== Bracket ====
First round
MVV Maastricht	0	1	1
NAC Breda	1	4	5
Willem II	2	2	4
VVV-Venlo (a.e.t.)	3	2	5
Almere City (a.e.t.)	0	3	3
Eindhoven	1	1	2

Semifinals
Emmen	2	2	4
NAC Breda	1	0	1
VVV-Venlo	1	1	2
Almere City (p)	1	1	2

Final
Emmen	0	1	1
Almere City	2	2	4

==== First round ====
22 May 2023
20:00

Eindhoven	1–0	Almere City
Dorenbosch 76'	Report

Jan Louwers Stadion, Eindhoven
Attendance: 3,518
Referee: Jannick van der Laan
26 May 2023
20:00

Almere City	3–1 (a.e.t.)	Eindhoven
Hilterman 80'; Limbombe 90+4'; Van La Parra 109'	Report	84' (pen.) Amevor

Yanmar Stadion, Almere
Attendance: 3,622
Referee: Marc Nagtegaal

Almere City won 3–2 on aggregate.

23 May 2023
18:45

VVV-Venlo	3–2	Willem II
Braken 41', 45+3' (pen.); Venema 65'	Report	13', 36' Hornkamp

De Koel, Venlo
Attendance: 5,392
Referee: Rob Dieperink
27 May 2023
16:30

Willem II	2–2 (a.e.t.)	VVV-Venlo
Kabangu 7'; Bosch 22'	Report	74' Venema; 120+1' Yasar

Koning Willem II Stadion, Tilburg
Attendance: 13,326
Referee: Ingmar Oostrom

VVV-Venlo won 5–4 on aggregate.

23 May 2023
21:00

NAC Breda	1–0	MVV Maastricht
Velanas 40' (pen.)	Report

Rat Verlegh Stadion, Breda
Attendance: 14,361
Referee: Alex Bos
27 May 2023
20:00

MVV Maastricht	1–4	NAC Breda
Livramento 67'	Report	20' Ómarsson; 29' Agougil; 38' Banzuzi; 90+3' Herrmann

De Geusselt, Maastricht
Attendance: 8,223
Referee: Erwin Blank

NAC Breda won 5–1 on aggregate.

==== Semifinals ====
30 May 2023
20:00

VVV-Venlo	1–1	Almere City
Van Rooijen 7'	Report	29' Limbombe

De Koel, Venlo
Attendance: 7,201
Referee: Martin van den Kerkhof
3 June 2023
16:30

Almere City	1–1 (a.e.t.)	VVV-Venlo
Duijvestijn 50'	Report	62' Allouch
Penalties
Van La Parra (penalty missed); Alhaft (penalty missed); Duijvestijn (penalty scored); Peña (penalty scored)	2–0	(penalty missed) Venema; (penalty missed) Allouch; (penalty missed) Koglin; (penalty missed) De Boer

Yanmar Stadion, Almere
Attendance: 4,019
Referee: Edwin van de Graaf

2–2 on aggregate. Almere City won 2–0 on penalties.

31 May 2023
18:45

NAC Breda	1–2	Emmen
Omgba 90+4'	Report	24' Burnet; 39' Romeny

Rat Verlegh Stadion, Breda
Attendance: 18,596
Referee: Joey Kooij
3 June 2023
20:00

Emmen	2–0	NAC Breda
Živković 62'; Assehnoun 90+4'	Report

De Oude Meerdijk, Emmen
Attendance: 8,309
Referee: Bas Nijhuis

Emmen won 4–1 on aggregate.

==== Final ====
6 June 2023
20:00

Almere City	2–0	Emmen
Duijvestijn 65' (pen.), 77'	Report

Yanmar Stadion, Almere
Attendance: 4,121
Referee: Danny Makkelie
11 June 2023
18:00

Emmen	1–2	Almere City
Vlak 58'	Report	50' Van La Parra; 53' Smeets

De Oude Meerdijk, Emmen
Referee: Allard Lindhout

Almere City won 4–1 on aggregate.

== Statistics ==
=== Top scorers ===
As of 19 May 2023

Rank	Player	Club	Goals
1	(Germany) Lennart Thy	PEC Zwolle	23
2	(Netherlands) Dylan Vente	Roda JC Kerkrade	21
3	(Sweden) Samuel Armenteros	Heracles Almelo	17
4	(Sweden) Emil Hansson	Heracles Almelo	16
4	(Denmark) Nikolai Laursen	Heracles Almelo	16
4	(Netherlands) Thomas van den Belt	PEC Zwolle	16
7	(Netherlands) Ruben van Bommel	MVV Maastricht	15
7	(Netherlands) Jason van Duiven	Jong PSV	15
9	(Netherlands) Odysseus Velanas	NAC Breda	14
9	(Netherlands) Martijn Kaars	Helmond Sport	14
9	(Netherlands) Thomas Verheydt	ADO Den Haag	14
9	(Suriname) Jeredy Hilterman	Almere City	14
9	(Morocco) Younes Taha	PEC Zwolle	14

=== Top assists ===
As of 12 May 2023

Rank	Player	Club	Assists
1	(Sweden) Emil Hansson	Heracles Almelo	19
1	(Netherlands) Koen Kostons	MVV Maastricht	19
3	(Netherlands) Jort van der Sande	NAC Breda	10
3	(Netherlands) Bart van Hintum	PEC Zwolle	10
5	(Canada) Charles-Andreas Brym	Eindhoven	9
5	(Netherlands) Danny Verbeek	Den Bosch	9
5	(Greece) Christos Giousis	Telstar	9
5	(Netherlands) Alexander Büttner	De Graafschap	9
5	(Belgium) Jarne Steuckers	MVV Maastricht	9
5	(Iceland) Kristian Hlynsson	Jong Ajax	9

=== Clean sheets ===
As of 12 May 2023

Rank	Player	Club	Clean sheets
1	(Netherlands) Jasper Schendelaar	PEC Zwolle	15
1	(Netherlands) Michael Brouwer	Heracles Almelo	15
3	(Netherlands) Nordin Bakker	Almere City	13
4	(Netherlands) Hidde Jurjus	De Graafschap	11
5	(Greece) Kostas Lamprou	Willem II	10
5	(Netherlands) Ronald Koeman Jr.	Telstar	10
5	(Netherlands) Mike Havekotte	Helmond Sport	10
8	(Republic of Ireland) Liam Bossin	Dordrecht	9
9	(Netherlands) Nigel Bertrams	Eindhoven	8
10	(Netherlands) Thijs Jansen	TOP Oss	7

=== Discipline ===
As of 12 May 2023

==== Player ====
- Most yellow cards: 10
  - (Netherlands) Niek Vossebelt (Roda JC Kerkrade)
- Most red cards: 2
  - (Netherlands) Collin Seedorf (Eindhoven)
  - (Canada) Charles-Andreas Brym (Eindhoven)
  - (Netherlands) Jari Schuurman (Dordrecht)

==== Club ====
- Most yellow cards: 73
  - Dordrecht
- Most red cards: 7
  - Eindhoven
  - ADO Den Haag

== Attendances ==
Rank	Club	Average	Highest
1	NAC Breda	16,834	18,623
2	PEC Zwolle	13,379	14,000
3	Willem II	13,252	14,300
4	Heracles Almelo	10,973	12,080
5	De Graafschap	9,578	11,021
6	Roda JC	7,040	9,132
7	MVV Maastricht	5,886	7,429
8	VVV-Venlo	5,394	7,346
9	ADO Den Haag	5,018	8,322
10	FC Den Bosch	4,164	5,003
11	FC Eindhoven	2,897	4,044
12	Almere City	2,299	3,183
13	SC Telstar	2,229	3,571
14	Helmond Sport	1,938	3,268
15	TOP Oss	1,903	2,293
16	FC Dordrecht	1,901	3,718
17	Jong PSV	1,190	8,860
18	Jong Ajax	1,095	1,761
19	Jong AZ	577	1,223
20	Jong FC Utrecht	477	1,138
