= Pepijn van de Merbel =

Dutch association footballer (born 2002)

Personal information
- Date of birth: 18 March 2002 (age 24)
- Place of birth: Oud Gastel, Netherlands
- Height: 1.86 m (6 ft 1 in)
- Position: Goalkeeper

Team information
- Current team: Den Bosch
- Number: 1

Youth career
- –2012: SC Gastel
- 2012–2014: Willem II
- 2014–2017: Brabant United
- 2017–2018: Den Bosch
- 2018–2021: NAC Breda

Senior career*
Years	Team	Apps	(Gls)
2022–2024	NAC Breda	7	(0)
2024–	Den Bosch	74	(0)
- * Club domestic league appearances and goals as of 12:26, 1 November 2026 (UTC)

Pepijn van de Merbel (born 18 March 2002) is a Dutch professional footballer who plays as a goalkeeper for Eerste Divisie club Den Bosch.

Van de Merbel came through the youth systems of Willem II, Den Bosch and NAC Breda. He made his professional debut for NAC in 2022 and was in goal when the club won promotion to the Eredivisie through the 2024 play-offs. He then rejoined Den Bosch, where he became first-choice goalkeeper.

== Early life and career ==
Van de Merbel was born in Oud Gastel, North Brabant. He began playing football at his hometown club, SC Gastel. He then joined the youth academy of Willem II. In 2014, he moved to the Den Bosch academy, where he spent four seasons. He joined NAC Breda's youth setup in 2018.

== Club career ==
=== NAC Breda ===
Van de Merbel signed his first professional contract with NAC in January 2021, a three-year deal. He continued to play for the under-21 side and said his aim was to learn as much as possible from the first team. He made his senior debut on 16 December 2022 in a 1–0 home defeat to Almere City in the Eerste Divisie. With other goalkeepers unavailable, 48-year-old goalkeeping coach Gábor Babos was named on the bench as his backup.

Van de Merbel was third choice for much of the 2023–24 season. Injuries to Roy Kortsmit and Tein Troost gave him his chance late in the campaign. He kept his place after Kortsmit returned to fitness. He became one of NAC's key players in the promotion play-offs, where NAC beat Roda JC and FC Emmen to reach the final. There they beat Excelsior 7–6 on aggregate to win promotion to the Eredivisie.

NAC offered Van de Merbel a new contract, but he chose to join Den Bosch, where his prospects of regular first-team football were better. He called promotion the best possible farewell after six years at the club.

=== Den Bosch ===
On 4 June 2024, Van de Merbel rejoined Den Bosch on a free transfer. He signed a two-year contract with an option for a third year. Technical director Bernard Schuiteman said he had made big strides over the previous year. Schuiteman added that his familiarity with the club would help his communication with the defenders.

An injury kept Van de Merbel out in September 2024, and Mees Bakker made his debut in his place. He returned on 13 December 2024 in a 1–1 home draw with Jong PSV after Bakker injured his knee. Den Bosch won a period title that season, and qualified for the promotion play-offs, a year after Van de Merbel had won promotion with NAC.

On 6 March 2026, Den Bosch took up the option in his contract, keeping him at the club until the summer of 2027.

On 23 October 2026, Van de Merbel was sent off in the 81st minute of a 2–2 home draw with MVV. The referee ruled that he had handled the ball outside his area. Van de Merbel said he had played the ball with his head. The KNVB rescinded the red card, which allowed him to play in the KNVB Cup tie against Rijnsburgse Boys.

== Career statistics ==
As of match played 27 October 2026

Appearances and goals by club, season and competition
Club	Season	League			KNVB Cup		Other		Total	
Club	Season	Division	Apps	Goals	Apps	Goals	Apps	Goals	Apps	Goals
NAC Breda	2022–23	Eerste Divisie	2	0	0	0	1 (Note: Appearance(s) in Eredivisie play-offs)	0	3	0
NAC Breda	2023–24	Eerste Divisie	6	0	0	0	5	0	11	0
NAC Breda	Total		8	0	0	0	6	0	14	0
Den Bosch	2024–25	Eerste Divisie	24	0	0	0	4	0	28	0
Den Bosch	2025–26	Eerste Divisie	38	0	3	0	2	0	43	0
Den Bosch	2026–27	Eerste Divisie	12	0	1	0	—		13	0
Den Bosch	Total		74	0	4	0	6	0	84	0
Career total			82	0	4	0	12	0	98	0
