= Bernard Schuiteman =

Dutch footballer and football executive (born 1973)

Personal information
- Date of birth: 3 October 1973 (age 53)
- Place of birth: Garderen, Netherlands
- Height: 1.86 m (6 ft 1 in)
- Position: Centre-back

Team information
- Current team: RKC Waalwijk (technical director)

Youth career
- VV De Veluwse Boys
- Twente

Senior career*
Years	Team	Apps	(Gls)
1993–1995	Bayer Leverkusen	6	(0)
1995–1999	Feyenoord	69	(2)
1998–1999	→ Utrecht (loan)	15	(0)
2000	Grazer AK	8	(0)
2001–2002	Mainz 05	8	(0)
2002	SpVgg Unterhaching	8	(0)
2002–2003	Apollon Limassol	19	(0)
2003–2006	Cambuur	54	(1)
2006–2007	Waidhofen/Ybbs	27	(0)
2009	Union Neuhofen/Ybbs	5	(0)
2010	ASK Ybbs	3	(0)
Total		222	(3)

International career
1989–1990	Netherlands U17	3	(0)
1990–1991	Netherlands U18	4	(0)
1994–1995	Netherlands U21	7	(0)
- * Club domestic league appearances and goals

Bernard Schuiteman (Dutch pronunciation: [ˈbɛrnɑrt ˈsxœytəmɑn]; born 3 October 1973) is a Dutch football executive and former professional footballer who played as a centre-back. He is the technical director of Eerste Divisie club RKC Waalwijk and is due to take up the same role at Vitesse on 1 December 2026.

Schuiteman came through the youth system of Twente and began his professional career with Bayer Leverkusen in 1993. He spent the best years of his playing career at Feyenoord, where he won the KNVB Cup in 1995 and formed a central defensive partnership with Ronald Koeman. He later played in Austria, Germany, Cyprus and the Netherlands before leaving professional football in 2006.

After his playing career, Schuiteman settled in Austria, where he worked as a youth coach and then as a scout. He scouted for Twente, Rapid Wien, Manchester United, Wolverhampton Wanderers and Feyenoord. He was sporting director of Grasshoppers from 2020 to 2021 and technical director of Den Bosch from 2024 to 2025.

== Early life ==
Schuiteman was born in Garderen, a village in Gelderland. His father was a baker. He played for local club VV De Veluwse Boys and was in its first team at the age of 15. No professional scouts came to watch him, so he wrote to professional clubs asking how he could become a professional footballer. Vitesse, Twente and FC Zwolle replied, and he chose Twente. He later said his father had taught him that sometimes you have to take the first step yourself.

While at Twente, Schuiteman played for the Netherlands under-17 team. Bayer Leverkusen showed interest in his second year at the club. He had a contract offer from Twente but had not signed it. In the years before the Bosman ruling, signing would have tied him to the club. His father handled the talks and asked Twente for an extra 100 guilders. Twente refused, and Schuiteman joined Leverkusen in the summer of 1993.

== Playing career ==
=== Bayer Leverkusen ===
At Leverkusen, Schuiteman's teammates included Ulf Kirsten, Andreas Thom, Ioan Lupescu, Paulo Sérgio and Bernd Schuster. He later said that Schuster, then in his late thirties, opened his eyes to professional life. Schuster was always first on the training pitch and the last to leave. Head coach Dragoslav Stepanović was not afraid to play young players and gave Schuiteman his chance. Bundesliga clubs could field only three foreign players at the time, however. Schuiteman therefore competed with the club's other foreigners as well as its defenders. He played seven Bundesliga matches for Leverkusen. He also played in the UEFA Cup for the club.

=== Feyenoord ===
In January 1995, Leverkusen sold Schuiteman to Feyenoord for about €750,000. He won the KNVB Cup with the club in his first season. He later called his time in Rotterdam the best period of his career. Feyenoord's supporters warmed to him as a no-nonsense defender, and he scored against Ajax.

Schuiteman was not always sure of his place at De Kuip. Feyenoord had first paired Koeman with the quicker Ulrich van Gobbel, but the defence conceded too many goals. Schuiteman then got his chance alongside Koeman. Some doubted whether two slow centre-backs could play together. Schuiteman later said the pair kept eight or nine clean sheets. He played both legs of Feyenoord's semi-final defeat to Rapid Wien in the 1995–96 UEFA Cup Winners' Cup. He also played in the UEFA Champions League for the club. In all, he made 82 appearances for Feyenoord.

Schuiteman ended his Feyenoord career on loan at Utrecht. Feyenoord won the 1998–99 Eredivisie while he was away. He has said he does not regard himself as a Dutch champion.

=== Later career ===
After his loan at Utrecht, Schuiteman moved to Austria and joined Grazer AK in 2000. He won the Austrian Cup with the club that season. Grazer AK were in financial difficulty and stopped paying his wages, and he left before his contract ended.

After several months without a club, Schuiteman joined 2. Bundesliga side Mainz 05 on a free transfer in early 2001. He arrived in mid-season and never established himself in the team. Brief spells followed with SpVgg Unterhaching in Germany and Apollon Limassol in Cyprus.

In 2003, Schuiteman returned to the Netherlands to join Eerste Divisie club Cambuur. He spent three seasons in Leeuwarden, where he rediscovered his enjoyment of the game. He left Cambuur in 2006 and moved back to Austria, where he played for amateur clubs, including FC Waidhofen/Ybbs.

=== International career ===
Schuiteman represented the Netherlands at youth level, including the under-16 team. He never played for the senior national team.

== Post-playing career ==
=== Coaching and scouting ===
Schuiteman gained his UEFA B licence in 2007 and his UEFA A licence in 2008. From 2006 to 2010, he ran an education centre for football and business in Waidhofen an der Ybbs. He also coached the local club's youth team and spent four months as interim manager of its first team. From 2010 to 2012, he was an academy coach in Linz, in charge of the under-15 side. He then worked as an international scout for Twente, covering south-eastern Europe.

In June 2014, Rapid Wien appointed Schuiteman as chief scout. He signed a contract until the end of the 2015–16 season. He left the club early, in March 2016, after a difference of views on scouting. In November 2016, he joined Manchester United as an academy scout for Central and Eastern Europe. He later became chief European scout at Wolverhampton Wanderers.

=== Grasshoppers ===
In April 2020, Grasshoppers were bought by Champion Union HK Holdings. The Hong Kong company was headed by the wife of Wolves owner Guo Guangchang. Schuiteman became sporting director of the club, which was then in the second-tier Swiss Challenge League. It was his first job as a sporting director. Because of the COVID-19 pandemic, he started work from home in Austria. He signed 18 players before and during the 2020–21 season, several of them from Wolves.

On 30 January 2021, Grasshoppers announced that Schuiteman had asked to end his contract. He said the role of sporting director did not suit him and that he preferred to work close to the pitch and the players. He also mentioned that his family lived in Austria. He left on 1 February 2021 with Grasshoppers top of the Challenge League. The club went on to win the league and promotion to the Swiss Super League.

=== Feyenoord and Urawa Red Diamonds ===
In the summer of 2021, Schuiteman returned to Feyenoord as a scout. He worked mainly in Austria. He was part of the scouting team that brought Gernot Trauner, Fredrik Aursnes and Dávid Hancko to the club. He also served as head of European recruitment at Japanese club Urawa Red Diamonds, who won the 2022 AFC Champions League.

=== Den Bosch ===
Den Bosch appointed Schuiteman as technical director on a contract of at least two seasons. He started on 10 April 2024, a day after the club announced investment from a group of Asian investors. On his first day, Den Bosch dismissed head coach Tomasz Kaczmarek. Schuiteman said the decision was about the playing style the club wanted, not Kaczmarek's ability.

In the summer of 2024, Schuiteman signed goalkeepers Pepijn van de Merbel and Mees Bakker. Den Bosch won the first period title of the 2024–25 season. In November 2024, Schuiteman nevertheless dismissed head coach David Nascimento. He said there had been too little attention to the club's development beyond the first team's results.

On 3 April 2025, Den Bosch announced that Schuiteman would leave at the end of the season. The club had planned for him to move into a wider role within the Bridge Football Group, its Asian shareholder. Schuiteman turned this down because he wanted to remain a technical director. The club's strategy did not allow him to stay on in that role. On 9 April 2025, Den Bosch dismissed him with immediate effect after learning that he would join a direct competitor.

=== RKC Waalwijk and Vitesse ===
The same day, RKC Waalwijk named Schuiteman as their technical director from the end of the season. He succeeded Mo Allach, who had joined Groningen. RKC were second from bottom of the Eredivisie at the time. He started work in Waalwijk in June 2025.

In September 2026, it was announced that Schuiteman would become technical director of Vitesse from 1 December 2026. Vitesse played in the same division as RKC. He followed RKC's general director Willem van der Linden, who had moved to Vitesse earlier that summer. RKC's new general director, Rob de Groot, said Schuiteman had put together a squad the club had great faith in. Schuiteman said that, as someone born and raised in Gelderland, he was glad of the chance to work at Vitesse.

== Style of play ==
Schuiteman was a robust centre-back whose first priority was to mark his opponent out of the game. He described himself as a no-nonsense player who was not afraid to kick an opponent to the ground. He lacked pace, and at Feyenoord there were doubts about pairing him with Koeman, who was also slow.

== Personal life ==
Schuiteman lived in Austria for many years. Rapid Wien described him as an adopted Austrian when they appointed him in 2014. His family was still based there when he left Grasshoppers in 2021.

== Honours ==
Feyenoord

- KNVB Cup: 1994–95

Grazer AK

- Austrian Cup: 1999–2000
