= 2024–25 Dundee United F.C. season =

Dundee United
2024–25 season
- Chairman: Mark Ogren
- Manager: Jim Goodwin
- Stadium: Tannadice Park
- Scottish Premiership: 4th
- Scottish Cup: Fourth round
- Scottish League Cup: Quarter-finals
- Top goalscorer: League: Sam Dalby (15); All: Sam Dalby (15)
- Highest home attendance: 14,268 vs. Rangers, Premiership, 15 September 2024
- Lowest home attendance: 1,966 vs. Stenhousemuir, League Cup, 16 July 2024
- Average home league attendance: 10,972
Home colours	Away colours	Third colours

The 2024–25 season was Dundee United's 115th season. It was their first season back in the Scottish Premiership, having been promoted from the Scottish Championship at the end of the 2023–24 season. The club also participated in the Scottish Cup and League Cup.

United finished the league campaign in fourth, guaranteeing entry into Europe for the following season.

== Results and fixtures ==
=== Pre-season and friendlies ===
22 June 2024 Friendly	Brechin City	0–2	Dundee United	Brechin
14:00		Report	Fotheringham 12'; Watt 85'	Stadium: Glebe Park

29 June 2024 Friendly	Dundee United	2–0	Annan Athletic	St Andrews
14:00				Stadium: St Andrews Training Centre

26 July 2024 Friendly	Dundee United	2–2	Luton Town	Dundee
19:45	Babunski 16'; Moult 76' (pen.)	Report	Clark 34' (pen.); Doughty 45+1'	Stadium: Tannadice Park; Attendance: 2,588

=== Scottish Premiership ===
4 August 2024 1	Dundee United	2–2	Dundee	Dundee
13:30	Trapanovski 13'; Thomson 23'	Report	Palmer-Houlden 18'; McCowan 79' (pen.)	Stadium: Tannadice Park; Attendance: 12,616; Referee: David Dickinson

10 August 2024 2	Ross County	1–1	Dundee United	Dingwall
15:00	Hale 90+5'	Report	Babunski 48'	Stadium: Victoria Park; Attendance: 4,169; Referee: Craig Napier

24 August 2024 3	Dundee United	2–0	St Johnstone	Dundee
15:00	Stephenson 54'; Sanders 88' (o.g.)	Report	Sidibeh (red card) 84'	Stadium: Tannadice Park; Attendance: 7,806

1 September 2024 4	Heart of Midlothian	0–1	Dundee United	Edinburgh
15:00		Report	Graham 76'	Stadium: Tynecastle Park; Attendance: 18,648; Referee: Nick Walsh

15 September 2024 5	Dundee United	0–1	Rangers	Dundee
12:00		Report	Lawrence 7'	Stadium: Tannadice Park; Attendance: 14,268; Referee: Don Robertson

28 September 2024 6	Kilmarnock	3–3	Dundee United	Kilmarnock
15:00	Watson 47', 58'; Watkins 64'	Report	Moult 21'; Sibbald 79'; Graham 90+9' (pen.)	Stadium: Rugby Park; Attendance: 6,257; Referee: Craig Napier

5 October 2024 7	St Mirren	0–1	Dundee United	Paisley
15:00		Report	Adegboyega 75'	Stadium: St Mirren Park; Attendance: 7,166; Referee: Ross Hardie

19 October 2024 8	Dundee United	3–2	Hibernian	Dundee
15:00	Dalby 20'; Stephenson 90+3'; Ubochioma 90+9'	Report	O'Hora 43'; Gayle 72'; Newell (red card) 85'	Stadium: Tannadice Park; Attendance: 10,870; Referee: Chris Graham

26 October 2024 9	Aberdeen	1–0	Dundee United	Aberdeen
17:30	Ambrose 84'	Report		Stadium: Pittodrie Stadium; Attendance: 19,274; Referee: Steven McLean

30 October 2024 10	Dundee United	1–2	Motherwell	Dundee
19:45	Sam Dalby 36'	Report	Maswanhise 23', 74'	Stadium: Tannadice Park; Attendance: 8,415; Referee: Lloyd Wilson

3 November 2024 11	Hibernian	1–1	Dundee United	Edinburgh
15:00	Miller 28'; Kukharevych (red card) 89'	Report	Dalby 90' (pen.)	Stadium: Easter Road; Attendance: 15,454; Referee: Colin Steven

9 November 2024 12	Dundee United	3–0	Ross County	Dundee
15:00	Stephenson 57'; Dalby 68'; Stirton 90+2'	Report		Stadium: Tannadice Park; Attendance: 8,349; Referee: John Beaton

23 November 2024 13	Rangers	1–1	Dundee United	Glasgow
15:45	Černý 66'	Report	Dalby 36'	Stadium: Ibrox Stadium; Attendance: 47,714; Referee: Don Robertson

30 November 2024 14	Dundee United	2–0	St Mirren	Dundee
15:00	Holt 79' (pen.); Adegboyega 90+3'	Report	Fraser (red card) 90+1'	Stadium: Tannadice Park; Attendance: 8,868; Referee: Matthew MacDermid

7 December 2024 15	Dundee United	1–1	Kilmarnock	Dundee
15:00	Dalby 79'	Report	Anderson 90+5' (pen.)	Stadium: Tannadice Park; Attendance: 8,402; Referee: Steven McLean

14 December 2024 16	Motherwell	4–3	Dundee United	Motherwell
15:00	Stamatelopoulos 1', 40'; Halliday 33'; Sparrow 67'	Report	Dalby 7' (pen.), 54'; Moult 87'	Stadium: Fir Park; Attendance: 4,473; Referee: Nick Walsh

22 December 2024 17	Dundee United	0–0	Celtic	Dundee
12:00		Report		Stadium: Tannadice Park; Attendance: 13,662; Referee: David Dickinson

26 December 2024 18	St Johnstone	1–2	Dundee United	Perth
15:00	Kirk 44'	Report	Middleton 51'; Dalby 60'; Gallagher (red card) 87'	Stadium: McDiarmid Park; Attendance: 7,306; Referee: Kevin Clancy

29 December 2024 19	Dundee United	1–0	Aberdeen	Dundee
17:15	Holt 90+4'	Report		Stadium: Tannadice Park; Attendance: 13,581; Referee: John Beaton

2 January 2025 20	Dundee	1–2	Dundee United	Dundee
17:30	Murray 61' (pen.)	Report	Ševelj 65'; Dalby 88'	Stadium: Dens Park; Attendance: 11,585; Referee: Steven McLean

5 January 2025 21	Dundee United	0–1	Heart of Midlothian	Dundee
15:00		Report	Penrice 73'	Stadium: Tannadice Park; Attendance: 10,214; Referee: Matthew MacDermid

8 January 2025 22	Celtic	2–0	Dundee United	Glasgow
19:45	Maeda 23'; Hatate 83'	Report		Stadium: Celtic Park; Attendance: 58,460; Referee: Kevin Clancy

11 January 2025 23	St Mirren	0–1	Dundee United	Paisley
15:00		Report	Moult 88'	Stadium: St Mirren Park; Attendance: 7,440; Referee: David Dickinson

26 January 2025 24	Dundee United	1–3	Rangers	Dundee
12:00	Dalby 19'	Report	Diomande 37' (red card) 90+5'; Pröpper 49'; Dessers 86'	Stadium: Tannadice Park; Attendance: 13,653; Referee: Nick Walsh

1 February 2025 25	Kilmarnock	1–0	Dundee United	Kilmarnock
15:00	Watkins 72'	Report		Stadium: Rugby Park; Attendance: 5,661; Referee: David Dickinson

15 February 2025 26	Celtic	3–0	Dundee United	Glasgow
15:00	McGregor 23'; Jota 35'; Idah 84'	Report		Stadium: Celtic Park; Referee: Nick Walsh

22 February 2025 27	Dundee United	1–0	Motherwell	Dundee
15:00	Dalby 31'	Report		Stadium: Tannadice Park; Attendance: 9,044; Referee: Chris Graham

26 February 2025 28	Dundee United	1–3	Hibernian	Dundee
19:45	Graham 6'	Report	Kukharevych 18'; Bowie 90'; Hoilett 90+10'	Stadium: Tannadice Park; Attendance: 10,674; Referee: David Dickinson

2 March 2025 29	Aberdeen	2–2	Dundee United	Aberdeen
15:00	Nisbet 75', 90+1'	Report	Ševelj 20'; Dalby 45+9'	Stadium: Pittodrie Stadium; Attendance: 17,862; Referee: Don Robertson

16 March 2025 30	Dundee United	2–4	Dundee	Dundee
15:00	Middleton 31'; Trapanovski 49'; Adegboyega (red card) 90+5'	Report	McGhee 17', 39'; Tiffoney 23'; Murray 90+7' (pen.)	Stadium: Tannadice Park; Attendance: 13,000; Referee: Nick Walsh

30 March 2025 31	Ross County	0–1	Dundee United	Dingwall
14:30		Report	Graham 74'	Stadium: Victoria Park; Attendance: 4,088; Referee: Steven McLean

6 April 2025 32	Heart of Midlothian	0–1	Dundee United	Edinburgh
14:30	Wilson (red card) 38'	Report	Dalby 67'	Stadium: Tynecastle Park; Attendance: 18,888; Referee: Nick Walsh

12 April 2025 33	Dundee United	1–0	St Johnstone	Dundee
15:00	Adegboyega 25'	Report		Stadium: Tannadice Park; Attendance: 10,160; Referee: Dan McFarlane

26 April 2025 34	Dundee United	0–5	Celtic	Dundee
12:30		Report	Strain 30' (o.g.); Kühn 38', 45+3'; Idah 47', 58'	Stadium: Tannadice Park; Attendance: 13,568; Referee: Don Robertson

3 May 2025 35	Hibernian	3–1	Dundee United	Edinburgh
15:00	Boyle 3'; Kukharevych 14'; Gayle 87'	Report	Trapanovski 50'	Stadium: Easter Road; Attendance: 18,399; Referee: John Beaton

10 May 2025 36	Dundee United	0–2	St Mirren	Dundee
15:00		Report	Mandron 31'; Ayunga 66'	Stadium: Tannadice Park; Attendance: 9,821; Referee: Steven McLean

14 May 2025 37	Rangers	3–1	Dundee United	Glasgow
19:45	Dessers 25', 73' (pen.); Raskin 75'	Report	Cleall-Harding 20'	Stadium: Ibrox Stadium; Attendance: 49,361; Referee: Calum Scott

17 May 2025 38	Dundee United	2–1	Aberdeen	Dundee
12:30	Gallagher 56'; Dalby 63' (pen.)	Report	Okkels 15'	Stadium: Tannadice Park; Attendance: 11,490; Referee: John Beaton

=== Scottish Cup ===
20 January 2025 Fourth round	Dundee	1–0	Dundee United	Dundee
20:00	Murray 1'	Report		Stadium: Dens Park; Attendance: 9,294; Referee: Matthew MacDermid

=== Scottish League Cup ===
==== Group stage ====
13 July 2024 1	Falkirk	2–0	Dundee United	Falkirk
15:00	Tait 62'; MacIver 71'	Report		Stadium: Falkirk Stadium; Attendance: 3,305; Referee: Iain Sneddon

16 July 2024 2	Dundee United	3–0	Stenhousemuir	Dundee
19:45	Moult 25'; Gallagher 34'; Trapanovski 47'	Report		Stadium: Tannadice Park; Attendance: 1,966; Referee: Don Robertson

20 July 2024 3	Dundee United	2–1	Ayr United	Dundee
17:15	Babunski 17'; Forbes 68'	Report	Rus 55'	Stadium: Tannadice Park; Attendance: 2,157; Referee: Kevin Clancy

23 July 2024 4	Buckie Thistle	2–5	Dundee United	Buckie
20:00	McCabe 48'; MacIver 67' (pen.)	Report	Trapanovski 19', 53'; Holt 32' (pen.), 77' (pen.); Babunski 61'	Stadium: Victoria Park; Attendance: 1,220; Referee: Calum Scott

==== Knockout phase ====
18 August 2024 Second round	Dundee United	1–0	St Mirren	Dundee
14:00	Graham 34'	Report		Stadium: Tannadice Park; Attendance: 4,285; Referee: John Beaton

20 September 2024 Quarter-finals	Motherwell	2–1	Dundee United	Motherwell
19:45	Robinson 45+1'; Miller 90+1' (pen.)	Report	Moult 83'	Stadium: Fir Park; Attendance: 8,327; Referee: John Beaton

== Player statistics ==
=== Appearances and goals ===
As of 17 May 2025

No.	Pos	Player	Premiership		League Cup		Scottish Cup		Total	
No.	Pos	Player	Apps	Goals	Apps	Goals	Apps	Goals	Apps	Goals
1	GK	(England) Jack Walton	36+0	0	4+0	0	1+0	0	41	0
2	DF	(Australia) Ryan Strain	26+2	0	2+0	0	1+0	0	31	0
5	MF	(Croatia) Vicko Ševelj	30+2	2	4+0	0	1+0	0	37	2
6	DF	(Scotland) Ross Graham	12+2	4	5+1	1	1+0	0	21	5
7	MF	(North Macedonia) Kristijan Trapanovski	16+12	3	6+0	3	0+1	0	35	6
8	MF	(Scotland) Lewis Fiorini	0+4	0	0+0	0	0+0	0	4	0
9	FW	(England) Louis Moult	4+14	3	4+2	1	1+0	0	25	4
10	MF	(North Macedonia) David Babunski	18+5	1	5+0	2	0+0	0	28	3
11	DF	(Republic of Ireland) Will Ferry	35+0	0	5+0	0	1+0	0	41	0
14	MF	(Scotland) Craig Sibbald	11+4	1	6+0	0	0+0	0	21	1
15	MF	(Scotland) Glenn Middleton	21+6	2	2+4	0	0+1	0	34	2
16	DF	(Republic of Ireland) Emmanuel Adegboyega	28+2	3	2+0	0	1+0	0	33	3
17	MF	(England) Luca Stephenson	25+3	3	2+0	0	1+0	0	31	3
18	FW	(Scotland) Kai Fotheringham	6+9	0	2+2	0	0+0	0	19	0
19	FW	(England) Sam Dalby	31+3	15	0+1	0	1+0	0	36	15
20	FW	(Bonaire) Jort van der Sande	9+23	0	2+0	0	0+1	0	35	0
21	FW	(Republic of Ireland) Ruari Paton	5+6	0	0+0	0	0+1	0	12	0
22	MF	(Scotland) Allan Campbell	8+4	0	0+0	0	0+0	0	12	0
23	MF	(Scotland) Ross Docherty	13+8	0	1+0	0	0+0	0	22	0
25	GK	(Wales) Dave Richards	2+0	0	2+0	0	0+0	0	4	0
31	DF	(Scotland) Declan Gallagher	33+0	1	5+0	1	1+0	0	39	2
37	DF	(Scotland) Samuel Cleall-Harding	4+0	1	0+0	0	0+0	0	4	1
40	MF	(Scotland) Sean Borland	0+0	0	0+0	0	0+0	0	0	0
Players who left the club during the 2024–25 season
4	DF	(Scotland) Kevin Holt	22+1	2	4+1	2	1+0	0	29	4
8	MF	(England) Liam Grimshaw	0+0	0	0+2	0	0+0	0	2	0
12	MF	(Kenya) Richard Odada	3+10	0	0+0	0	0+0	0	13	0
13	GK	(Scotland) Jack Newman	0+0	0	0+0	0	0+0	0	0	0
27	FW	(Scotland) Rory MacLeod	0+0	0	0+1	0	0+0	0	1	0
29	MF	(Scotland) Miller Thomson	5+9	1	1+3	0	0+0	0	18	1
30	MF	(Scotland) Lewis O'Donnell	0+0	0	0+1	0	0+0	0	1	0
32	FW	(Scotland) Tony Watt	0+0	0	0+3	0	0+0	0	3	0
36	MF	(Scotland) Bryan Mwangi	0+0	0	0+0	0	0+0	0	0	0
38	FW	(Scotland) Brandon Forbes	0+0	0	0+2	1	0+0	0	2	1
39	MF	(Scotland) Scott Constable	0+0	0	0+0	0	0+0	0	0	0
41	GK	(Scotland) Ruairidh Adams	0+0	0	0+0	0	0+0	0	0	0
42	FW	(Scotland) Owen Stirton	0+1	1	0+2	0	0+0	0	3	1
43	DF	(Scotland) Adam Carnwath	0+0	0	0+0	0	0+0	0	0	0
70	FW	(Nigeria) Meshack Ubochioma	0+2	1	0+1	0	0+0	0	3	1

== Team statistics ==
=== League table ===
Pos	Team	Pld	W	D	L	GF	GA	GD	Pts	Qualification or relegation (Note: Teams play each other three times (33 matches), before the league is split into two groups (the top six and the bottom six).)
2	Rangers	38	22	9	7	80	41	+39	75	Qualification for the Champions League second qualifying round
3	Hibernian	38	15	13	10	62	50	+12	58	Qualification for the Europa League second qualifying round
4	Dundee United	38	15	8	15	45	54	−9	53	Qualification for the Conference League second qualifying round
5	Aberdeen	38	15	8	15	48	61	−13	53	Qualification for the Europa League play-off round (Note: Aberdeen qualified for the Europa League play-off round as the 2024–25 Scottish Cup winners.)
6	St Mirren	38	14	8	16	53	59	−6	50	

Rules for classification: 1) Points; 2) Goal difference; 3) Goals scored; 4) Head-to-head points; 5) Head-to-head goal difference; 6) Play-off (only if deciding champion, UEFA competitions qualification, second stage group allocation or relegation).

=== League cup table ===
Pos	Team	Pld	W	PW	PL	L	GF	GA	GD	Pts	Qualification	FAL	DUN	AYR	STE	BUC
1	Falkirk	4	3	0	0	1	11	2	+9	9	Qualification for the second round	—	2–0	—	4–0	—
2	Dundee United	4	3	0	0	1	10	5	+5	9	Qualification for the second round	—	—	2–1	3–0	—
3	Ayr United	4	3	0	0	1	9	5	+4	9		1–0	—	—	—	3–2
4	Stenhousemuir	4	1	0	0	3	5	11	−6	3		—	—	1–4	—	4–0
5	Buckie Thistle	4	0	0	0	4	5	17	−12	0		1–5	2–5	—	—	—

Rules for classification: 1) goal difference, 2) goals scored, 3) away goals scored, 4) matches won, 5) away matches won, 6) drawing of lots.

== Transfers ==
=== Players in ===
Player	From	Fee
(Republic of Ireland) Will Ferry	(England) Cheltenham Town	Free
(Wales) Dave Richards	(England) Crewe Alexandra	Free
(Croatia) Vicko Ševelj	(Slovenia) NK Radomlje	Free
(Australia) Ryan Strain	(Scotland) St Mirren	Free
(North Macedonia) Kristijan Trapanovski	(North Macedonia) KF Shkupi	Free
(North Macedonia) David Babunski	(Hungary) Mezőkövesdi SE	Free
(Bonaire) Jort van der Sande	(Netherlands) ADO Den Haag	Undisclosed
(Kenya) Richard Odada	(United States) Philadelphia Union	Undisclosed
(Nigeria) Meshack Ubochioma	(Hungary) Zalaegerszegi TE	Free
(Scotland) Allan Campbell	(England) Luton Town	Free

=== Players out ===
Player	To	Fee
(Uganda) Sadat Anaku	(Uganda) Kampala CC	Free
(Australia) Mark Birighitti		Free
(Scotland) Layton Bisland	(Scotland) Arbroath	Free
(Scotland) Logan Chalmers	(Scotland) Partick Thistle	Free
(Ghana) Mathew Cudjoe	(Israel) Bnei Sakhnin	Free
(Scotland) Flynn Duffy	(Scotland) Inverness CT	Free
(Scotland) Declan Glass	(Scotland) Cove Rangers	Free
(Scotland) Scott McMann	(Scotland) Ayr United	Free
(Scotland) Archie Meekison	(Republic of Ireland) Bohemian	Free
(Scotland) Chris Mochrie	(Scotland) Airdrieonians	Free
(Scotland) Craig Moore		Free
(Canada) David Wotherspoon	(Scotland) Dunfermline Athletic	Free
(Scotland) Brandon Forbes	(England) Norwich City	Undisclosed
(England) Liam Grimshaw		Free
(Scotland) Alan Domeracki	(England) Norwich City	Undisclosed
(Scotland) Kevin Holt	(Republic of Ireland) Derry City	Undisclosed

=== Loans in ===
Player	From	Fee
(England) Jack Walton	(England) Luton Town	Loan
(Republic of Ireland) Emmanuel Adegboyega	(England) Norwich City	Loan
(England) Luca Stephenson	(England) Liverpool	Loan
(England) Sam Dalby	(Wales) Wrexham	Loan
(Republic of Ireland) Ruari Paton	(England) Port Vale	Loan
(Scotland) Lewis Fiorini	(England) Stockport County	Loan

=== Loans out ===
Player	To	Fee
(Scotland) Jack Newman	(Scotland) Inverness CT	Loan
(Scotland) Ruairidh Adams	(Scotland) Kelty Hearts	Loan
(Scotland) Bryan Mwangi	(Scotland) Broxburn Athletic	Loan
(Scotland) Tony Watt	(Scotland) Motherwell	Loan
(Scotland) Lewis O'Donnell	(Scotland) Queen of the South	Loan
(Scotland) Sean Borland	(Scotland) Cumbernauld Colts	Loan
(Scotland) Rory MacLeod	(England) Southampton	Loan
(Scotland) Samuel Cleall-Harding	(Scotland) Kelty Hearts	Loan
(Scotland) Adam Carnwath	(Scotland) Cumbernauld Colts	Loan
(Scotland) Jack Newman	(Scotland) Livingston	Loan
(Scotland) Adam Carnwath	(Scotland) Peterhead	Loan
(Nigeria) Meshack Ubochioma	(Scotland) Livingston	Loan
(Scotland) Zeke Cameron	(Scotland) Cowdenbeath	Loan
(Scotland) Owen Stirton	(Scotland) Montrose	Loan
(England) Charlie Dewar	(Scotland) Alloa Athletic	Loan
(Scotland) Scott Constable	(Scotland) Stirling Albion	Loan
(Scotland) Miller Thomson	(Scotland) Falkirk	Loan
(Kenya) Richard Odada	(Serbia) OFK Beograd	Loan
