= Jort van der Sande =

Bonairean footballer (born 1996)

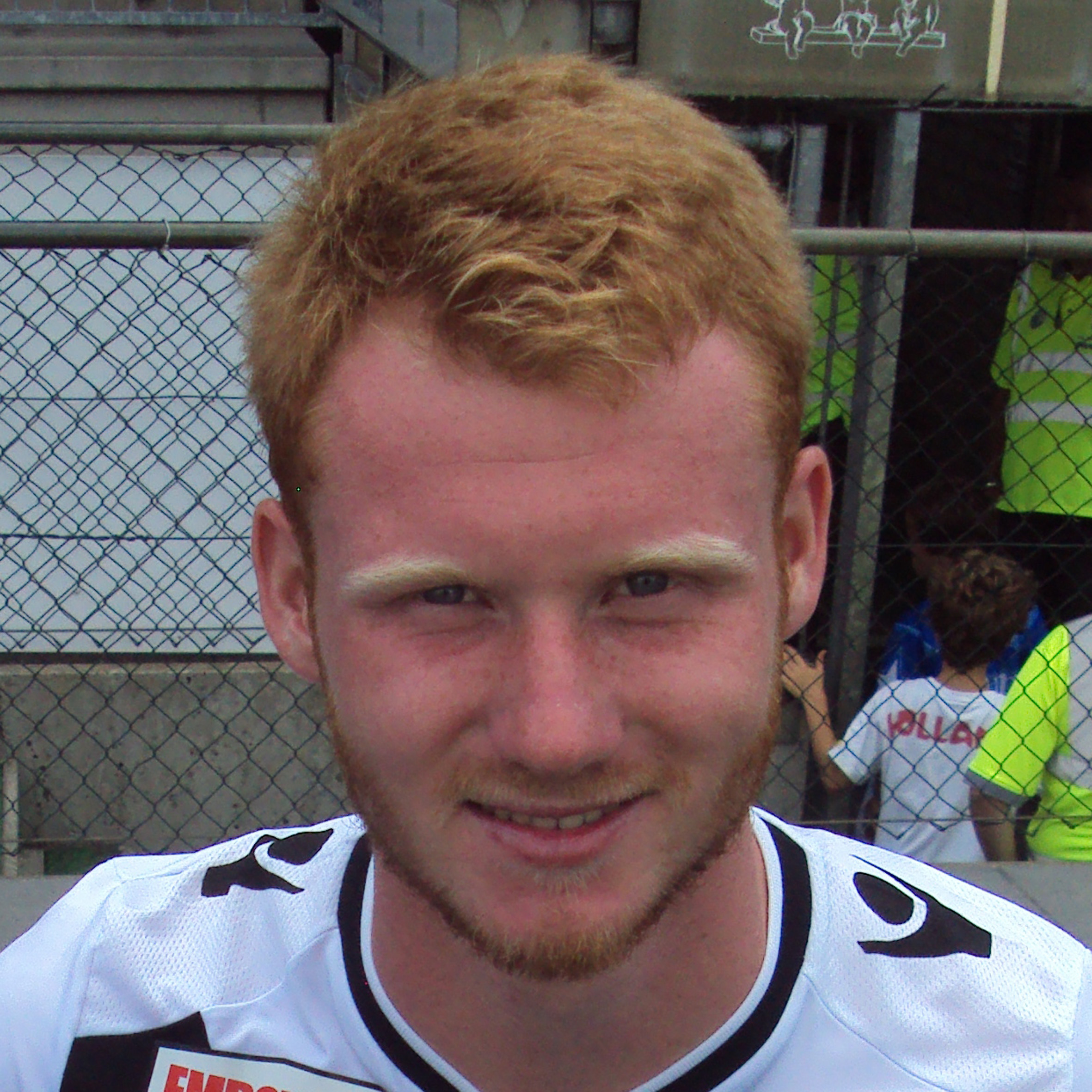
- Van der Sande in 2015

Personal information
- Date of birth: 25 January 1996 (age 30)
- Place of birth: 's-Hertogenbosch, Netherlands
- Height: 1.83 m (6 ft 0 in)
- Position: Forward

Team information
- Current team: Bali United
- Number: 20

Youth career
- SV Audacia
- –2006: VV Heeswijk
- 2006–2014: Den Bosch

Senior career*
Years	Team	Apps	(Gls)
2014–2019	Den Bosch	103	(20)
2019–2022	Eindhoven	81	(21)
2022–2023	NAC Breda	36	(13)
2023–2024	ADO Den Haag	31	(11)
2024–2025	Dundee United	32	(0)
2025–2026	Cambuur	34	(9)
2026–	Bali United	4	(3)

International career^{‡}
2023–	Bonaire	9	(1)
- * Club domestic league appearances and goals as of 10 October 2026 ‡ National team caps and goals as of 17 November 2024

Jort van der Sande (born 25 January 1996) is a professional footballer who plays as a forward for Super League club Bali United. Born in the Netherlands, he represents the Bonaire national team.

== Club career ==
=== FC Den Bosch ===
Van der Sande joined the youth academy of FC Den Bosch at age 10. He made his professional debut in the Eerste Divisie for the club on 15 August 2014 in a match against VVV-Venlo. He scored his first goal for the club on 6 February 2015 away against RKC Waalwijk, which ended in a 3–0 away win. Van der Sande scored the final goal in the match, after an assist from Alexander Mols. Van der Sande signed a contract extension with FC Den Bosch in March 2017, which would keep him at the club until 30 June 2019. He finished his stint with FC Den Bosch with 104 league appearances in which he scored 21 goals and made 11 assists. He also appeared for the reserve team, Jong FC Den Bosch, playing in the Derde Divisie and Hoofdklasse.

=== FC Eindhoven ===
On 17 June 2019, Van der Sande moved to FC Eindhoven as a free agent, signing a three-year contract with the Eerste Divisie side. He made his debut on 9 August in a 2–1 away win over NEC. Shortly after arriving, on 21 August 2019, he suffered a metatarsal fracture, sidelining him for at least three months. Van der Sande scored his first goal for the club on 17 December 2019 in a 2–0 away win over Excelsior in the KNVB Cup.

Van der Sande had a strong 2021–22 season, scoring 13 goals in 39 appearances. He contributed as Eindhoven qualified for promotion play-offs, where they were, however, knocked out by ADO Den Haag in the semi-finals.

=== NAC Breda ===
On 25 April 2022, Van der Sande signed a two-year contract with NAC Breda with an option for an additional year. He scored on his competitive debut for the club on 15 August 2023, less than ten minutes after coming on as a 62nd-minute substitute Boyd Lucassen, as NAC lost 3–1 to MVV. Van der Sande would go on to score 13 goals in 42 appearances for the club, leaving NAC in August 2023.

=== ADO Den Haag ===
On 29 August 2023, Van der Sande signed a three-year contract with ADO Den Haag. He made his debut on 3 September, scoring twice in a 4–1 league win over Jong AZ. On 27 November he registered a first-half hat-trick in a 6–0 victory against Jong Utrecht.

Van der Sande finished the 2023–24 Eerste Divisie campaign as ADO's second-highest league scorer with 11 goals, and also ranked second at the club for league assists with seven, behind Henk Veerman (23 league goals) and Daryl van Mieghem (16 league assists). ADO reached the promotion play-offs before being eliminated by Excelsior in the semi-final.

=== Dundee United ===
On 25 July 2024, Van der Sande joined Dundee United on a two-year contract. He made his Scottish Premiership debut on 4 August in the Dundee derby, a 2–2 draw at Tannadice. Used across the forward line during 2024–25, he was unable to score in the league; by early February he had made 27 Premiership appearances without a goal, a sequence he acknowledged publicly while stressing his contribution off the ball.

=== Cambuur ===
On 6 August 2025, Van der Sande returned to the Netherlands to sign for Cambuur on a two-year contract with an option for a further season. He made his debut on 25 August, coming on for Yoram van der Veen in the 78th minute of a 1–0 away victory over Jong AZ. A month later, he made his first start and scored twice in the first half, helping Cambuur to a 5–3 win over Jong PSV.

== International career ==
On 5 October 2023, Van der Sande was named by Bonaire national team coach Rilove Janga in the squad to face Anguilla in a 2023–24 CONCACAF Nations League match on 12 October. Van der Sande was eligible due to him living on the Caribbean island for five years during his youth. He made his international debut in the match, an eventual 2–0 victory.

== Career statistics ==
=== Club ===
As of match played 11 October 2025

Appearances and goals by club, season and competition
Club	Season	League			National cup (Note: Includes KNVB Cup, Scottish Cup)		League cup (Note: Includes Scottish League Cup)		Other		Total	
Club	Season	Division	Apps	Goals	Apps	Goals	Apps	Goals	Apps	Goals	Apps	Goals
FC Den Bosch	2014–15	Eerste Divisie	20	4	0	0	—		—		20	4
FC Den Bosch	2015–16	Eerste Divisie	5	1	0	0	—		—		5	1
FC Den Bosch	2016–17	Eerste Divisie	22	4	0	0	—		—		22	4
FC Den Bosch	2017–18	Eerste Divisie	35	8	2	0	—		—		37	8
FC Den Bosch	2018–19	Eerste Divisie	21	1	0	0	—		2 (Note: Appearance(s) in Eerste Divisie promotion play-offs)	1	23	2
FC Den Bosch	Total		103	20	2	0	—		2	1	107	21
FC Eindhoven	2019–20	Eerste Divisie	10	0	2	1	—		—		12	1
FC Eindhoven	2020–21	Eerste Divisie	37	8	1	0	—		—		38	8
FC Eindhoven	2021–22	Eerste Divisie	34	13	1	0	—		4	0	39	13
FC Eindhoven	Total		81	21	4	1	—		4	0	89	22
NAC Breda	2022–23	Eerste Divisie	33	13	2	0	—		4	0	39	13
NAC Breda	2023–24	Eerste Divisie	3	0	0	0	—		—		3	0
NAC Breda	Total		36	13	2	0	—		4	0	42	13
ADO Den Haag	2023–24	Eerste Divisie	31	11	4	2	—		4	0	39	13
Dundee United	2024–25	Scottish Premiership	32	0	1	0	2	0	—		35	0
Cambuur	2025–26	Eerste Divisie	9	2	0	0	—		—		9	2
Career total			292	67	13	3	2	0	14	1	319	71

=== International ===
As of match played 17 November 2024

Appearances and goals by national team and year
National team	Year	Apps	Goals
Bonaire	2023	3	0
Bonaire	2024	6	1
Total		9	1

Scores and results list Bonaire's goal tally first, score column indicates score after each Sande goal.

List of international goals scored by Jort van der Sande
No.	Date	Venue	Opponent	Score	Result	Competition	Ref.
1	8 September 2024	Stadion Antonio Trenidat, Rincon, Bonaire	El Salvador	1–2	1–2	2024–25 CONCACAF Nations League B	
