= Mees Bakker =

Dutch footballer (born 2001)

Personal information
- Date of birth: 11 March 2001 (age 25)
- Place of birth: Heiloo, Netherlands
- Height: 1.90 m (6 ft 3 in)
- Position: Goalkeeper

Youth career
- –2011: HSV Heiloo
- 2011–2019: AZ

Senior career*
Years	Team	Apps	(Gls)
2018–2023	Jong AZ	13	(0)
2020–2023	AZ	0	(0)
2022–2023	→ De Graafschap (loan)	1	(0)
2023–2024	De Graafschap	17	(0)
2024–2026	Den Bosch	14	(0)
Total		45	(0)

International career
2016	Netherlands U15	2	(0)
2016–2017	Netherlands U16	6	(0)
2017–2018	Netherlands U17	4	(0)
2018	Netherlands U18	3	(0)
2019	Netherlands U19	5	(0)
Medal record
Representing Netherlands
UEFA European Under-17 Championship
Winner	England 2018	U-17 Team
- * Club domestic league appearances and goals

Mees Bakker (born 11 March 2001) is a Dutch former professional footballer who played as a goalkeeper.

Bakker came through the academy of AZ and made his professional debut for Jong AZ in 2018. He was part of the Netherlands squad that won the 2018 UEFA European Under-17 Championship. He later played for De Graafschap and Den Bosch in the Eerste Divisie. He retired from professional football in 2026 at the age of 25.

== Early life ==
Bakker was born in Heiloo, North Holland. He played tennis to a good standard as a boy before choosing football. He supported AZ from childhood. He began playing at hometown club HSV Heiloo and joined the AZ academy at the age of 11.

== Club career ==
=== AZ ===
Bakker made his professional debut for reserve team Jong AZ on the opening day of the 2018–19 season. Coach Michel Vonk started him at home against Almere City on 20 August 2018, and he played the full match. Almere scored three times in the first half hour. Tijjani Reijnders and Ferdy Druijf replied for Jong AZ, and the match ended 3–2 to Almere.

Before the 2020–21 season, Bakker was promoted to the first-team squad as third-choice goalkeeper behind Marco Bizot and Hobie Verhulst. He continued to play for the reserves. By the summer of 2022, AZ had four other goalkeepers in the first-team squad, and Bakker could expect little playing time.

=== De Graafschap ===
On 7 July 2022, Bakker joined Eerste Divisie club De Graafschap on a season-long loan with an option to buy. He made his debut for the club on the final day of the season, 19 May 2023, in a 3–0 home win against Den Bosch.

De Graafschap took up the option on 1 June 2023. Bakker signed a one-year contract with an option for a further season. He started the 2023–24 season as first choice after Hidde Jurjus left for Groningen. He lost his place to Thijs Jansen in December 2023 after a run of weaker performances.

=== Den Bosch ===
On 6 June 2024, Bakker signed a three-year contract with Den Bosch. Technical director Bernard Schuiteman said Bakker had proved himself at De Graafschap and had the modern profile the club wanted in a goalkeeper.

Bakker began the 2024–25 season as understudy to Pepijn van de Merbel. An injury to Van de Merbel gave him his debut on 13 September 2024 in a 2–0 home win against ADO Den Haag. He went off with cramp after 70 minutes and was replaced by debutant Tjemme Bijlsma. Three days later, he saved a penalty from Georgios Charalampoglou in a 3–0 away win against Jong FC Utrecht. He suffered cramp again in a 1–0 home win against Emmen on 20 September and was substituted after 82 minutes. Bakker said he believed the cramp had a psychological cause and spoke to a psychologist about it.

Bakker kept his place for 14 matches until he injured his knee against Helmond Sport on 6 December 2024. Den Bosch won a period title that season, which Bakker later called the best memory of his career.

On 6 March 2026, Den Bosch announced that Bakker's contract would be terminated by mutual consent from 1 July 2026. He was retiring from professional football at the age of 25. In a statement on social media, he said the football world had become less enjoyable for him each year. He also said he wanted to be a good father to his daughter and to enjoy life again. In a later interview, he described years of setbacks and inner struggles during his career.

== International career ==
Bakker was part of the Netherlands under-17 squad that won the 2018 UEFA European Under-17 Championship in England. He played one group match, against Serbia, and was the backup goalkeeper for the rest of the tournament.

== Career statistics ==
Appearances and goals by club, season and competition
Club	Season	League			KNVB Cup		Europe		Other		Total	
Club	Season	Division	Apps	Goals	Apps	Goals	Apps	Goals	Apps	Goals	Apps	Goals
Jong AZ	2018–19	Eerste Divisie	1	0	—		—		—		1	0
Jong AZ	2019–20	Eerste Divisie	2	0	—		—		—		2	0
Jong AZ	2020–21	Eerste Divisie	10	0	—		—		—		10	0
Jong AZ	Total		13	0	—		—		—		13	0
De Graafschap (loan)	2022–23	Eerste Divisie	1	0	2	0	—		0	0	3	0
De Graafschap	2023–24	Eerste Divisie	17	0	0	0	—		0	0	17	0
De Graafschap	Total		18	0	2	0	—		0	0	20	0
Den Bosch	2024–25	Eerste Divisie	14	0	1	0	—		—		15	0
Career total			45	0	3	0	0	0	0	0	48	0

== Honours ==
Netherlands U17

- UEFA European Under-17 Championship: 2018
