= Rico Zeegers =

Dutch footballer (born 2000)

Personal information
- Full name: Rico Theodorus Johannes Zeegers
- Date of birth: 19 January 2000 (age 26)
- Place of birth: Sittard, Netherlands
- Height: 1.81 m (5 ft 11 in)
- Position: Right-back

Team information
- Current team: EVV

Youth career
- 2007–2009: Slekker Boys
- 2009–2012: PSV
- 2012–2013: Slekker Boys
- 2013–2015: Fortuna Sittard
- 2015–2019: PSV

Senior career*
Years	Team	Apps	(Gls)
2019–2021	Jong PSV	17	(0)
2021	→ MVV (loan)	15	(0)
2021–2023	MVV	54	(0)
2023–2024	Wezel Sport	32	(2)
2024–	EVV		
- * Club domestic league appearances and goals as of 12:57, 9 November 2024 (UTC)

Rico Theodorus Johannes Zeegers (born 19 January 2000) is a Dutch footballer who plays as a right-back for Vierde Divisie club EVV.

== Career ==
=== Early years ===
Zeegers played youth football for Slekker Boys, Fortuna Sittard and PSV, eventually signing his first professional contract with the latter in 2019; a two-year deal.

He made his senior debut for Jong PSV in the Eerste Divisie on 16 August 2019, starting at centre-back in a 3–2 away loss to Almere City.

=== MVV ===
He joined MVV on a six-month loan on 12 January 2021. He made his debut for the club on 15 January 2021, starting at right-back in a 3–0 away loss to Go Ahead Eagles. He provided his first assist on 12 April, a cutback pass to Jérôme Déom who slotted home for the 1–0 lead in an eventual 4–2 home loss to rivals Roda JC Kerkrade.

On 4 June 2021, the deal was made permanent and Zeegers signed a two-year contract with MVV. He suffered a foot injury during practice in November 2022, which required surgery. The injury ruled him out for several months.

== Career statistics ==
As of match played 23 May 2023

Appearances and goals by club, season and competition
Club	Season	League			National Cup		Other		Total	
Club	Season	Division	Apps	Goals	Apps	Goals	Apps	Goals	Apps	Goals
Jong PSV	2019–20	Eerste Divisie	14	0	—		—		14	0
Jong PSV	2020–21	Eerste Divisie	3	0	—		—		3	0
Jong PSV	Total		17	0	—		—		17	0
MVV (loan)	2020–21	Eerste Divisie	15	0	1	0	—		16	0
MVV	2021–22	Eerste Divisie	33	0	2	0	—		35	0
MVV	2022–23	Eerste Divisie	21	0	1	0	1 (Note: Appearances in Eredivisie promotion/relegation playoffs)	0	23	0
MVV	Total		69	0	4	0	1	0	74	0
Career total			86	0	4	0	1	0	91	0
