= Richard Odada =

Kenyan footballer (born 2000)

Personal information
- Date of birth: 25 November 2000 (age 25)
- Place of birth: Nairobi, Kenya
- Height: 1.90 m (6 ft 3 in)
- Position: Defensive midfielder

Team information
- Current team: UTA Arad
- Number: 16

Youth career
- –2018: Lasier Hill Academy
- 2018: Leopards
- 2019–2020: Red Star Belgrade

Senior career*
Years	Team	Apps	(Gls)
2018–2019	Leopards	0	(0)
2020–2022	Red Star Belgrade	2	(0)
2020	→ Grafičar Beograd (loan)	24	(0)
2021–2022	→ Metalac Gornji Milanovac (loan)	27	(0)
2022–2024	Philadelphia Union	0	(0)
2022–2023	Philadelphia Union II	8	(0)
2023–2024	→ AaB (loan)	21	(4)
2024–2025	Dundee United	13	(0)
2025	→ OFK Beograd (loan)	6	(0)
2025–	UTA Arad	26	(2)

International career^{‡}
2018	Kenya U20	2	(1)
2021–	Kenya	29	(1)
- * Club domestic league appearances and goals as of 22 August 2026 ‡ National team caps and goals as of 7 June 2026

Richard Odada (born November 25, 2000) is a Kenyan professional footballer who plays as a defensive midfielder for Liga I club UTA Arad and the Kenya national team.

== Club career ==
=== Early career ===
Odada played with Lasier Hill Academy as a youth player before joining Kenyan Premier League club Leopards in July 2018. While he made the first team game day roster 11 times in the 2018–19 season, he made no appearances. Later that year, his performances earned him training and trial stints in Serbia with Red Star Belgrade and Voždovac, in Switzerland, and in Italy with Juventus and Inter Milan.

=== Red Star Belgrade ===
On 30 January 2019 after a successful trial, Odada joined Serbian SuperLiga club Red Star Belgrade. He was initially assigned to the club's under-19 side. To later get playing time at the senior level, Odada was initially loaned to Grafičar Beograd, an affiliate club of Red Star often used for development of its younger players.

On 30 January 2020, Odada was sent on loan to Serbian First League club Grafičar Beograd. He made his debut on 29 February 2020 in a 3–0 victory against Radnički Pirot, where he played all 90 minutes. In the 2019–20 season, he played 7 matches, recording one assist in a 5–0 victory over Sinđelić Beograd on 20 June 2020. In the 2020–21 season, while remaining on loan with Grafičar Beograd through January 2021, Odada played 14 matches in the First League, during which he recorded an assist against Radnički Pirot on 30 August 2020. He also played one game in the Serbian Cup against Voždovac.

Odada returned to Red Star in January 2021, and remained there through the end of the 2020–21 season. He made his SuperLiga debut as a substitute on 28 February 2021 in a 4–0 victory over Proleter Novi Sad. On 2 March 2021, he also made a substitute appearance in a 4–1 victory over Mladost Lučani.

During the 2021–22 season, Odada was loaned to Metalac Gornji Milanovac in the SuperLiga. He made his debut as a starter on 19 July 2021 in a 0–0 draw against Radnik Surdulica. He went on to play 27 games, including 17 starts, during the season, in addition to one game in the Serbian Cup. After the conclusion of his loan to Metalac Gornji Milanovac, Red Star had planned to loan Odada again to Grafičar Beograd for the 2022–23 season, with his contract set to expire on 31 December 2022. Instead of starting the season with a return to Grafičar Beograd, Odada switched player agencies on 9 July 2022 to help explore transfer opportunities.

=== Philadelphia Union ===
On August 8, 2022, Odada joined Philadelphia Union in a transfer from Red Star on 2.5 years contract, with an optional 2 years. He will occupy an international roster slot.

On 15 August 2023, Odada joined newly relegated Danish 1st Division club AaB on a one-year loan deal with a purchase option.

== International career ==
=== Youth ===
On 17 January 2016, Odada was called into a provisional under-17 camp for Inter Government Agency Development games in advance of qualifiers for the 2017 Africa U-17 Cup of Nations.

On 1 April 2018, Odada scored the lone goal in his debut for the Kenya under-20 national team in a 2019 Africa U-20 Cup of Nations first round qualifier match against Rwanda that ended in a 1–1 draw. He also served as the team captain. Odada was a substitute in the return leg in Rwanda, a 0–0 tie which eliminated Kenya on the away goals rule.

=== Senior ===
Odada made his debut for the Kenya national football team on 2 September 2021 in a World Cup qualifier against Uganda. He started and played the full match in a 0–0 home draw. His national team coach, Jacob Mulee, praised Odada's debut, saying "we have had different players coming in, and new players who were making their debut. I was impressed with Odada, meaning he has solved our problem in the midfield department. He is just 20 and has a lot to offer.". His performance neutralizing the Uganda attack and replacing Victor Wanyama as Kenya's defensive midfielder also earned him accolades in the press. Odada also played World Cup qualifiers against Rwanda (a 1–1 away tie) and Mali (a 5–0 away loss and 1–0 home loss). In his 5th international game, Odada scored his first national team goal, a game-winning penalty kick, for Kenya in its November 15, 2021 World Cup qualifier 2–1 win over Rwanda.

== Career statistics ==
=== Club ===
As of match played 22 August 2026

Appearances and goals by club, season and competition
Club	Season	League			National cup (Note: Includes Serbian Cup, Danish Cup)		Continental		Other		Total	
Club	Season	Division	Apps	Goals	Apps	Goals	Apps	Goals	Apps	Goals	Apps	Goals
Grafičar Beograd (loan)	2019–20	Serbian First League	7	0	—		—		—		7	0
Grafičar Beograd (loan)	2020–21	Serbian First League	17	0	1	0	—		—		18	0
Grafičar Beograd (loan)	Total		24	0	1	0	—		—		25	0
Red Star Belgrade	2020–21	Serbian SuperLiga	2	0	0	0	0	0	—		2	0
Metalac Gornji Milanovac (loan)	2021–22	Serbian SuperLiga	27	0	1	0	—		—		28	0
Philadelphia Union	2022	Major League Soccer	0	0	0	0	—		—		0	0
AaB (loan)	2023–24	Danish 1st Division	21	4	1	0	—		—		22	4
Dundee United	2024–25	Scottish Premiership	13	0	0	0	—		1 (Note: Appearance in Scottish Challenge Cup)	0	14	0
OFK Beograd (loan)	2024–25	Serbian SuperLiga	6	0	0	0	—		—		6	0
UTA Arad	2025–26	Liga I	20	2	2	0	—		—		22	2
UTA Arad	2026–27	Liga I	6	0	0	0	—		—		6	0
UTA Arad	Total		26	2	2	0	—		—		28	2
Career total			121	6	5	0	0	0	1	0	127	6

=== International ===
As of match played 7 June 2026

Appearances and goals by national team and year
National team	Year	Apps	Goals
Kenya
Kenya	2021	5	1
Kenya	2022	0	0
Kenya	2023	8	0
Kenya	2024	9	0
Kenya	2025	3	0
Kenya	2026	4	0
Total		29	1

Scores and results list Romania's goal tally first, score column indicates score after each Odada goal.

List of international goals scored by Richard Odada
No.	Date	Venue	Opponent	Score	Result	Competition
1	15 November 2021	Nyayo National Stadium, Nairobi, Kenya	Rwanda	2–0	2–1	2022 FIFA World Cup qualification

== Honours ==
Red Star Belgrade

- Serbian SuperLiga: 2020–21
- Serbian Cup: 2020–21
