= Roy Kortsmit =

Dutch footballer (born 1992)

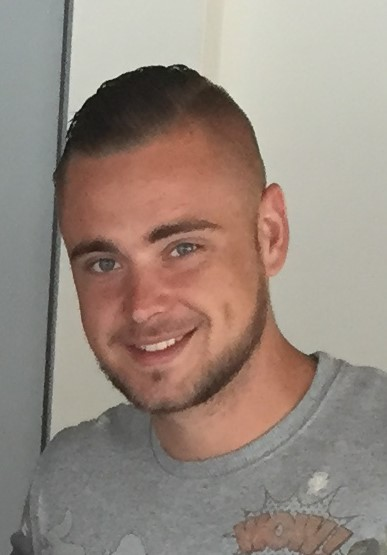

Personal information
- Full name: Roy Kortsmit
- Date of birth: 26 August 1992 (age 34)
- Place of birth: Hook of Holland, Netherlands
- Height: 1.90 m (6 ft 3 in)
- Position: Goalkeeper

Team information
- Current team: NAC Breda
- Number: 23

Youth career
- –2007: Feyenoord
- 2007–2008: Westlandia
- 2008–2011: Sparta Rotterdam

Senior career*
Years	Team	Apps	(Gls)
2011–2013	Jong Sparta	20	(0)
2011–2019	Sparta Rotterdam	156	(0)
2020	Almere City	0	(0)
2020–	NAC Breda	65	(0)
- * Club domestic league appearances and goals as of 07:28, 8 June 2025 (UTC)

Roy Kortsmit (born 26 August 1992) is a Dutch professional footballer who plays as a goalkeeper for Eerste Divisie club NAC Breda.

== Career ==
Born just outside Rotterdam at Hook of Holland, Kortsmit began his youth career at Feyenoord, until he was 15 years old. He left the then KNVB Cup champions in 2007, but didn't move far as he joined local side Westlandia. He spent a year with them and, in 2008, joined Feyenoord's rivals Sparta. The goalkeeper made his first appearance at under-19 level in a 3–1 defeat to sc Heerenveen. The following year, Kortsmit played in Sparta's reserve squad for two seasons and played 20 games, during which they were relegated from the Beloften Eredivisie.

Finally, on 11 April 2014, aged 22, he made his professional debut against SC Telstar. He was a half-time substitution for Khalid Sinouh and conceded an 87th-minute winner in a 2–1 home loss. He also made a second-half appearance in a 3–1 away defeat in a relegation/promotion play-off game, at the hands of FC Dordrecht. Kortsmit has now made more than 100 professional appearances for Sparta, he was heavily involved in the successful promotion battle in 2015–16. He made international headlines in 2017 by pulling off four consecutive saves in just six seconds in a 1–0 away defeat to Den Haag.

== Career statistics ==
As of match played 8 March 2024.

Club	Season	League			National cup		Continental		Other		Total	
Club	Season	Division	Apps	Goals	Apps	Goals	Apps	Goals	Apps	Goals	Apps	Goals
Sparta Rotterdam	2011–12	Eerste Divisie	0	0	0	0	—		0	0	0	0
Sparta Rotterdam	2012–13	Eerste Divisie	0	0	0	0	—		0	0	0	0
Sparta Rotterdam	2013–14	Eerste Divisie	1	0	0	0	—		1	0	2	0
Sparta Rotterdam	2014–15	Eerste Divisie	37	0	2	0	—		—		39	0
Sparta Rotterdam	2015–16	Eerste Divisie	35	0	2	0	—		—		37	0
Sparta Rotterdam	2016–17	Eredivisie	33	0	5	0	—		—		38	0
Sparta Rotterdam	2017–18	Eredivisie	19	0	1	0	—		1	0	21	0
Sparta Rotterdam	2018–19	Eerste Divisie	31	0	1	0	—		0	0	32	0
Sparta Rotterdam	Total		156	0	11	0	—		2	0	169	0
Almere City	2019–20	Eerste Divisie	0	0	—		—		—		0	0
NAC Breda	2020–21	Eerste Divisie	4	0	0	0	—		0	0	4	0
NAC Breda	2021–22	Eerste Divisie	0	0	0	0	—		0	0	0	0
NAC Breda	2022–23	Eerste Divisie	37	0	3	0	—		3	0	43	0
NAC Breda	2023–24	Eerste Divisie	23	0	0	0	—		0	0	23	0
NAC Breda	2024-25	Eredivisie	1	0	0	0	—		0	0	1	0
NAC Breda	2025-26	Eredivisie	0	0	0	0	—		0	0	0	0
NAC Breda	Total		65	0	3	0	—		3	0	71	0
Career total			220	0	14	0	0	0	5	0	239	0

== Honours ==
Sparta Rotterdam

- Eerste Divisie: 2015–16
