= Alex Plat =

Dutch footballer (born 1998)

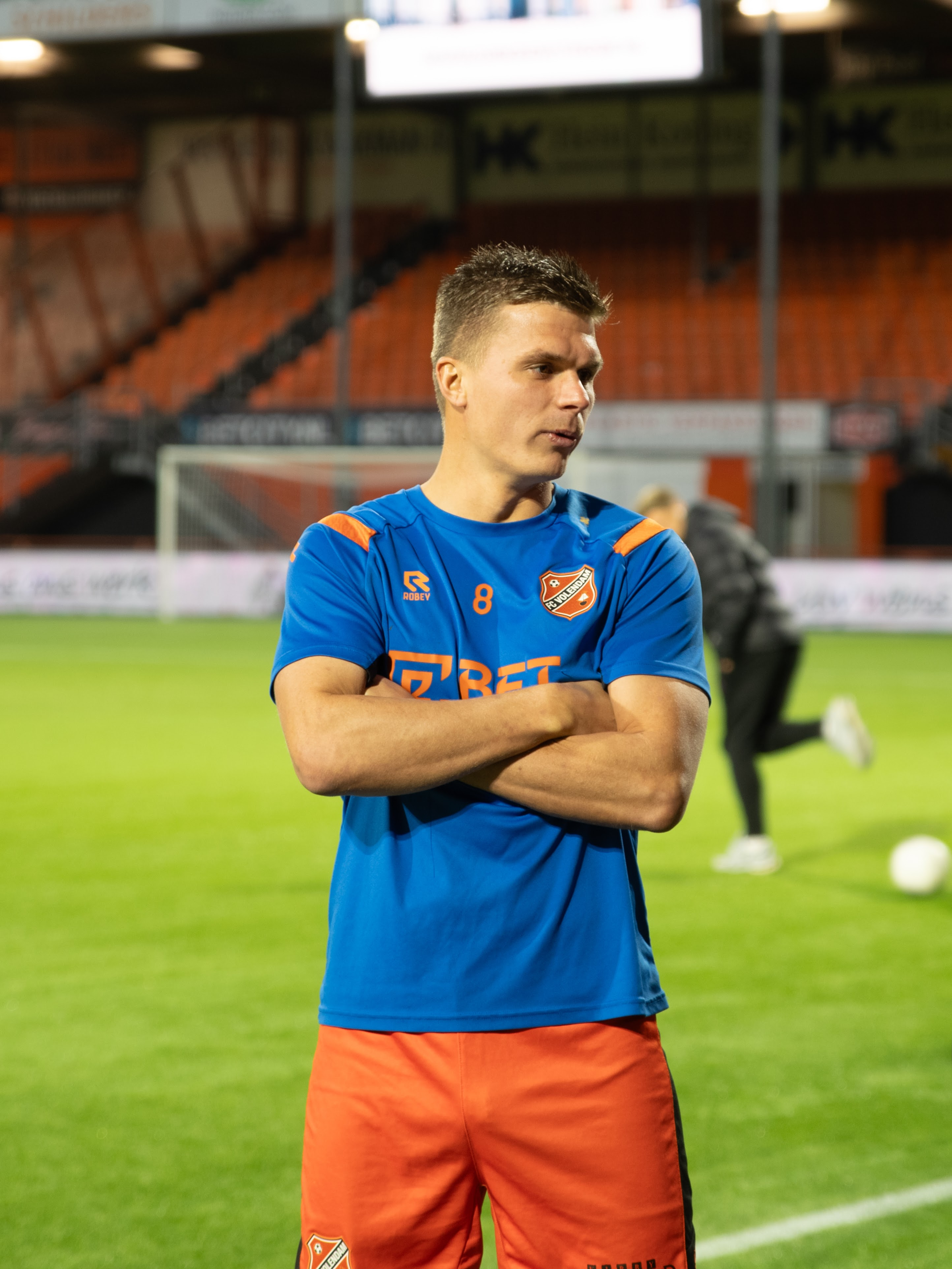
- Plat in 2025

Personal information
- Date of birth: 4 February 1998 (age 28)
- Place of birth: Volendam, Netherlands
- Height: 1.78 m (5 ft 10 in)
- Position: Defensive midfielder

Team information
- Current team: Volendam
- Number: 6

Youth career
- RKAV Volendam
- –2017: Volendam

Senior career*
Years	Team	Apps	(Gls)
2016–2019	Jong Volendam	62	(2)
2017–2022	Volendam	105	(0)
2022–2023	NAC Breda	21	(0)
2023–2024	Telstar	34	(1)
2024–	Volendam	52	(7)
- * Club domestic league appearances and goals as of 19 May 2026

Alex Plat (born 4 February 1998) is a Dutch footballer who plays as a midfielder for Eerste Divisie club Volendam.

== Career ==
=== Volendam ===
Plat started playing football at RKAV Volendam, after which he moved to the youth academy of FC Volendam. He signed his first contract on 30 March 2015, on a deal until 2017 with an option for an additional season. At the end of the 2016–17 season, the option in his contract was triggered and he was extended for one year.

He made his Eerste Divisie debut for Volendam on 20 October 2017 in a game against NEC as a 71st-minute substitute for Luís Pedro. He mainly played for the reserve team, Jong Volendam in the Derde Divisie that season, winning promotion to the third-tier Tweede Divisie in May 2019.

On 8 March 2019, Plat signed a new contract with Volendam until 2020. He mainly featured as a starter the following season, making 23 appearances as a starter before the season was abandoned due to the COVID-19 pandemic. On 10 October 2019, he had signed another contract extension keeping him at Volendam until 2022.

=== NAC Breda ===
Plat joined NAC Breda on 1 July 2022 as his contract with Volendam had expired, signing a two-year contract with an option for an additional year. Plat was revealed as captain during the open day of the new season.

=== Telstar ===
On 31 August 2023, Plat signed a one-year contract with Eerste Divisie club Telstar, after his contract with NAC had been terminated by mutual consent earlier that day. He made his debut for the club the following day, replacing Lassana Faye in the 71st minute of a 1–0 league loss to FC Eindhoven. In the subsequent match, a 2–1 defeat at home against VVV-Venlo on 9 September, Plat earned his first start for Telstar, solidifying his position as a regular starter since then.

=== Return to Volendam ===
On 6 June 2024, Plat returned to Volendam on a three-year contract.

== Career statistics ==
As of match played 10 May 2024

Appearances and goals by club, season and competition
Club	Season	League			KNVB Cup		Other		Total	
Club	Season	Division	Apps	Goals	Apps	Goals	Apps	Goals	Apps	Goals
Jong Volendam	2015–16	Beloften Eredivisie	2	0	—		—		2	0
Jong Volendam	2016–17	Derde Divisie	20	1	—		—		20	1
Jong Volendam	2017–18	Derde Divisie	24	1	—		—		24	1
Jong Volendam	2018–19	Derde Divisie	16	0	—		—		16	0
Jong Volendam	Total		62	2	—		—		62	2
Volendam	2017–18	Eerste Divisie	13	0	0	0	—		13	0
Volendam	2018–19	Eerste Divisie	7	0	0	0	—		7	0
Volendam	2019–20	Eerste Divisie	23	0	0	0	—		23	0
Volendam	2020–21	Eerste Divisie	35	0	1	0	1 (Note: Appearance(s) in Eerste Divisie promotion play-offs)	0	37	0
Volendam	2021–22	Eerste Divisie	27	0	1	0	—		28	0
Volendam	Total		105	0	2	0	1	0	108	0
NAC Breda	2022–23	Eerste Divisie	21	1	1	0	—		22	1
Telstar	2023–24	Eerste Divisie	34	1	1	0	—		35	1
Career total			160	4	4	0	1	0	165	4

== Honours ==
Jong Volendam

- Derde Divisie – Sunday: 2018–19
