= Kristijan Trapanovski =

Macedonian footballer

Personal information
- Date of birth: 14 August 1999 (age 27)
- Place of birth: Bitola, Macedonia
- Height: 1.80 m (5 ft 11 in)
- Position: Left winger

Team information
- Current team: Dundee United
- Number: 7

Youth career
- 2013–2015: Akademija Pandev

Senior career*
Years	Team	Apps	(Gls)
2015–2017	Akademija Pandev		
2017–2020	Slavia Prague B	9	(0)
2018	→ Tatran Prešov (loan)	4	(0)
2018–2019	→ Viktoria Žižkov (loan)	9	(0)
2019–2020	→ Podbrezová (loan)	10	(2)
2020	Akademija Pandev	15	(1)
2020–2024	Shkupi	101	(15)
2024–	Dundee United	47	(5)

International career^{‡}
	North Macedonia U17	9	(0)
2017–2018	North Macedonia U19	20	(1)
2018–2020	North Macedonia U21	13	(0)
2022–2025	North Macedonia	2	(0)
- * Club domestic league appearances and goals as of 20 May 2026 ‡ National team caps and goals as of 7 October 2025

Kristijan Trapanovski (Macedonian: Кристијан Трапановски; born 14 August 1999) is a Macedonian professional footballer who currently plays for Scottish Premiership club Dundee United as a left winger.

== Club career ==
Born in Bitola, Trapanovski started playing football for the youth team of Akademija Pandev until the summer in 2015, when he got promoted to the senior team of the club, competing in the Macedonian Third League. He performed at Akademija Pandev for two consecutive seasons and helped the team advance from the third to the first division within only two years. Then, in the summer of 2017, after reaching the top Macedonian tier he decided to continue his career abroad by signing for SK Slavia Prague. Four months later, on 28 February 2018, he got loaned to Slovak side FC Tatran Prešov to get some playing experience on senior level playing in the first Slovak division. During the six-month loan he made four appearances for the club, in all of them coming in as a substitute from the bench. Kristijan joined Dundee United in June 2024 after a lengthy wait for a work permit.

== International career ==
Trapanovski has been a regular member of Macedonian U-17 and U-19 national teams. On 24 May 2018 he also made his debut for Macedonia U-21 in a friendly match against Azerbaijan.
