= Kaj de Rooij =

Dutch footballer

Personal information
- Date of birth: 25 November 2000 (age 25)
- Place of birth: Best, Netherlands
- Height: 1.84 m (6 ft 0 in)
- Position: Forward

Team information
- Current team: Valladolid
- Number: 22

Youth career
- 2005–2009: Wilhelmina Boys
- 2009–2010: FC Eindhoven
- 2010–2016: Willem II
- 2016–2017: FC Eindhoven

Senior career*
Years	Team	Apps	(Gls)
2018–2020	FC Eindhoven	40	(10)
2020–2023	NAC Breda	73	(10)
2024–2026	PEC Zwolle	58	(8)
2026–	Valladolid	0	(0)
- * Club domestic league appearances and goals as of 21 May 2026

Kaj de Rooij (born 25 November 2000) is a Dutch professional footballer who plays as a forward for Segunda División club Real Valladolid.

== Club career ==
He made his Eerste Divisie debut for FC Eindhoven on 17 August 2018 in a game against Jong PSV, as an 85th-minute substitute for Alessio Carlone.

On 4 October 2020, he signed a three-year contract with NAC Breda.

On 30 January 2024, de Rooij joined PEC Zwolle until the end of the season on an amateur basis. After the season, he signed a two-year professional deal.

At the end of the 2025–26 season, his contract with PEC Zwolle was not renewed. De Rooij subsequently signed a four-year deal with Spanish club Real Valladolid.
