= Sven Swinnen =

Belgian football manager (born 1974)

Personal information
- Date of birth: 5 December 1974 (age 51)

Team information
- Current team: KV Mechelen youth (manager)

Managerial career
- Years: Team
- 2000–2010: KV Mechelen U19
- 2010–2012: Katelijne Waver (assistant)
- 2012: Katelijne Waver (assistant)
- 2012–2020: KV Mechelen (assistant)
- 2020–2021: KV Mechelen U21 (assistant)
- 2022: Helmond Sport
- 2022–2023: OH Leuven (assistant)
- 2023: OH Leuven (caretaker)
- 2023: OH Leuven (assistant)
- 2023–: KV Mechelen youth

Sven Swinnen (born 5 December 1974) is a Belgian professional football manager who is currently managing KV Mechelen youth.

== Managerial career ==
Swinnen had to stop playing football at the age of seventeen due to injuries, but several years later he started his first managerial job at KV Mechelen where had played for over ten years. He became the coach of several players that later became professional footballers, including Steven Defour and Joren Dom. After a short stint at lower-level team Katelijne Waver, Swinnen returned to KV Mechelen and became assistant in 2012. He held this position until 2020 but then was appointed the new role of Head of Performance, in which he set up an intensive collaboration between KV Mechelen and Dutch club Helmond Sport. When Helmond Sport sacked Wil Boessen in February 2022, Swinnen took over as manager but was unable to improve the clubs position in the standings causing the team to end dead-last, despite a notable win against Emmen. At the end of the season his contract was prolonged for two more seasons, but in October 2022 he was sacked following disappointing results.

Swinnen then moved to Oud-Heverlee Leuven where he became the assistant of Marc Brys following the departure of his assistant Issame Charaï. Swinnen also took over for one match due to Marc Brys being absent for personal reasons in February 2023, but the left at the end of the 2022–23 season to rejoin KV Mechelen as manager of the youth squad.
