= Thomas Marijnissen =

Dutch footballer (born 1998)

Personal information
- Date of birth: 29 December 1998 (age 27)
- Place of birth: Breda, Netherlands
- Height: 1.80 m (5 ft 11 in)
- Position: Left winger

Youth career
- –2010: BSV Boeimeer
- 2010–2017: NAC Breda

Senior career*
| Years | Team | Apps | (Gls) |
| 2016–2017 | NAC Breda | 1 | (0) |
| 2018 | Rood-Wit Willebrord | | |
| 2019 | Zwarte Leeuw | | |
| 2019–2020 | RKSV Halsteren | 18 | (10) |
| 2020–2022 | Kozakken Boys | 40 | (15) |
| 2022–2024 | NAC Breda | 26 | (2) |
| 2024–2025 | Lokeren-Temse | 16 | (0) |
- * Club domestic league appearances and goals as of 18 April 2025

Thomas Marijnissen (born 29 December 1998) is a Dutch professional footballer who plays as a left winger.

== Club career ==
He made his professional debut in the Eerste Divisie for NAC Breda on 25 November 2016 in a 3–1 defeat away against SC Cambuur.

Marijnissen took a career break at the age of 18, because of his personal circumstances, he no longer felt the happiness about playing football, especially after his father's death.

In mid-2018, he resumed his career, in the Eerste Klasse for RKSV Rood-Wit Willebrord. From early 2019 until the summer break, he played for the Belgian Zwarte Leeuw in the fifth-tier Belgian Division 3. Afterwards, he returned to the Netherlands to play for RKSV Halsteren, before moving to third-tier Tweede Divisie club Kozakken Boys in August 2020, where he would go on to score 15 goals in 40 appearances.

Marijnissen returned to NAC Breda on 25 July 2022 after having left the club five years earlier. He signed a two-year contract.

On 29 October 2024, Marijnissen signed with Belgian Challenger Pro League club Lokeren-Temse, on a contract for the rest of the season.

== Personal life ==
Raised in Roosendaal, in North Brabant, Netherlands with his brother Luc Marijnissen, who is also a professional footballer. They were both playing in the Belgian leagues in the 2024–25 season, with Luc playing his trade at Lierse.
