= Luc Marijnissen =

Dutch footballer

Personal information
- Date of birth: 9 January 2003 (age 23)
- Place of birth: Roosendaal, Netherlands
- Height: 1.82 m (6 ft 0 in)
- Position: Defender

Team information
- Current team: Mechelen
- Number: 2

Youth career
- 2013–2022: NAC Breda

Senior career*
Years	Team	Apps	(Gls)
2022–2023	NAC Breda	12	(0)
2023–2025	Lierse	47	(3)
2025–2026	Dender EH	35	(1)
2026–	Mechelen	1	(0)
- * Club domestic league appearances and goals as of 16 August 2026

Luc Marijnissen (born 9 January 2003) is a Dutch professional footballer who plays as a defender for Belgian Pro League club Mechelen.

== Career ==
=== NAC Breda ===
From Roosendaal, Marijinissen played as a youngster for BSC Roosendaal before he started playing at the youth academy of NAC Breda, when he was just 10 years-old. He progressed through the entire youth academy to the first-team, making his professional debut as a substitute in the Eerste Divisie against MVV on 4 March 2022. He then proceeding to make his full debut a week later, having his first league start for the club at his home ground in a 2–0 win against De Graafschap in the Eerie Divisie. At the end of the season, he signed his first professional contract with NAC Breda, in August 2021.

=== Lierse ===
In July 2023, he signed for Belgian side Lierse agreeing a one-year contract with the option for another. He made his league debut for the club in the Challenger Pro League in a 3–2 away defeat to Club Brugge II on 12 August 2023. He scored his first league goal on 12 November 2023, in a 4–2 away win against RFC Liege in the Challenger Pro League.

=== Dender EH ===
On 12 May 2025, Marijnissen signed a contract with Dender EH for three years, with an option for fourth.

=== Mechelen ===
Following the relegation of Dender EH, on 15 August 2026 Marijnissen signed a four-year contract with Mechelen.

== Personal life ==
Marijnissen was born in Roosendaal, in North Brabant, Netherlands. His brother, Thomas, is also a professional footballer, and they were both playing in the Belgian leagues in the 2024–25 season, with Thomas playing his trade at K.S.C. Lokeren-Temse.
