= Sabir Agougil =

Moroccan footballer

Personal information
- Date of birth: 18 January 2002 (age 24)
- Place of birth: Rotterdam, Netherlands
- Height: 1.82 m (6 ft 0 in)
- Position: Midfielder

Team information
- Current team: FC Paradiso
- Number: 21

Youth career
- Unitas '30
- 2012–2021: NAC Breda

Senior career*
Years	Team	Apps	(Gls)
2021–2024	NAC Breda	59	(2)
2025–	FC Paradiso	9	(1)
- * Club domestic league appearances and goals as of 26 June 2026

Sabir Agougil (Arabic: صابر عقوجيل; born 18 January 2002) is a footballer who plays as a midfielder for FC Paradiso.

== Club career ==
Agougil joined NAC Breda at the age of ten, having previously played for Unitas '30. He made his debut in a 2–0 Eerste Divisie win against ADO Den Haag.

== International career ==
Agougil is eligible to represent both the Netherlands and Morocco at international level. He has trained with the under-17 and under-23 teams of Morocco.

== Personal life ==
Sabir's brother, Oualid Agougil, is also a footballer and currently plays for Ajax. Their father Ahmed Agougil works as a hairdresser in Etten-Leur.

== Career statistics ==
=== Club ===
As of 16 May 2022

Appearances and goals by club, season and competition
Club	Season	League			Cup		Other		Total	
Club	Season	Division	Apps	Goals	Apps	Goals	Apps	Goals	Apps	Goals
NAC Breda	2021–22	Eerste Divisie	16	0	4 (Note: Appearances in the KNVB Cup)	0	0	0	20	0
Career total			16	0	4	0	0	0	20	0
