= Odysseus Velanas =

Dutch footballer (born 1998)

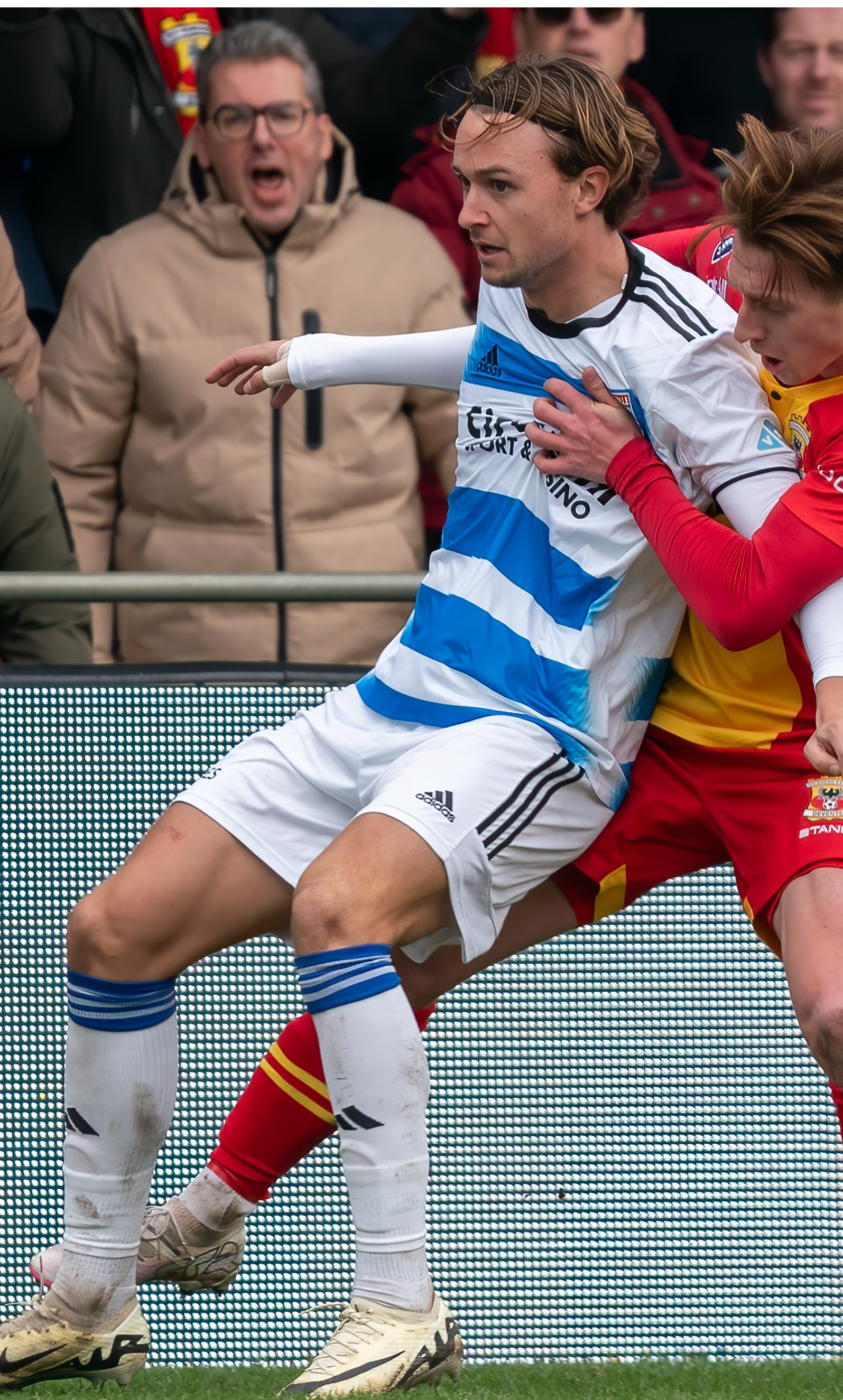
- 2024

Personal information
- Date of birth: 5 June 1998 (age 28)
- Place of birth: Samos, Greece
- Height: 1.80 m (5 ft 11 in)
- Position: Midfielder

Team information
- Current team: PEC Zwolle
- Number: 18

Youth career
- VV Jonathan
- 2013–2016: Utrecht

Senior career*
Years	Team	Apps	(Gls)
2016–2021	Jong Utrecht	113	(17)
2017–2021	Utrecht	4	(0)
2019	→ Helmond Sport (loan)	6	(0)
2021–2023	NAC Breda	60	(24)
2023–	PEC Zwolle	73	(8)

International career^{‡}
2015	Netherlands U17	1	(0)
2015–2016	Netherlands U18	4	(0)
2016–2017	Netherlands U19	7	(1)
- * Club domestic league appearances and goals as of 21 May 2026 ‡ National team caps and goals as of 28 March 2017

Odysseus Velanas (Greek: Ὀδυσσεύς Βελανάς; born 5 June 1998) is a professional footballer who plays as a midfielder for Eredivisie club PEC Zwolle. Born in Greece, he has represented the Netherlands at youth level.

== Club career ==
Born in Samos, Greece, Velanas subsequently joined the youth system of VV Jonathan after moving to the Netherlands at a young age, before he was later picked up by Utrecht in July 2013. Velanas made his professional debut in the second-tier Eerste Divisie for Jong FC Utrecht on 5 August 2016 in a game against NAC Breda. He played two matches for the first team in the 2017–18 season and otherwise played for Jong Utrecht.

After having had not played for the professional team in the first half of the 2018–19 season, he was sent on a six-month loan to second-tier Helmond Sport at the end of January 2019. Velanas suffered a thigh injury in his fourth league appearance in February 2019 and was sidelined for large parts of the spring. By the end of the season he made six appearances. On 1 July 2019, Utrecht announced their intention to extend his contract, an agreement which ran until the summer of 2022.

On 22 July 2021, he signed contract with NAC Breda for one year with an option for the second year.

On 7 July 2023, Velanas moved to PEC Zwolle on a three-year contract.

== International career ==
Holding both Dutch and Greek citizenship, Velanas has played for the Netherlands at under-17, under-18, and under-19 level.
