= Tomasz Kaczmarek =

Polish football manager (born 1984)

Personal information
- Date of birth: 20 September 1984 (age 42)
- Place of birth: Wrocław, Poland
- Position: Forward

Senior career*
Years	Team	Apps	(Gls)
- SpVg Porz
2006–2008	FC Junkersdorf		

Managerial career
- 2011: Bonner SC (U19)
- 2011: Bonner SC
- 2015–2016: Viktoria Köln
- 2017: Stuttgarter Kickers
- 2018–2019: Fortuna Köln
- 2021–2022: Lechia Gdańsk
- 2023–2024: Den Bosch
- 2026: Radomiak Radom
- 2026: Raków Częstochowa
- * Club domestic league appearances and goals

Tomasz Kaczmarek (born 20 September 1984) is a Polish professional football manager and former player who was most recently the manager of Ekstraklasa club Raków Częstochowa.

== Coaching career ==
Kaczmarek moved from Poland to Germany at the age of 9 and only played on amateur level as an active footballer.

He started his coaching career in 2009 as a part of the coaching staff at Bonner SC. From January 2011, he took charge of the U19's at the club and later a half year for the first team, which he was in charge of until the end of 2011, where he was hired as assistant manager for the Egyptian national team under manager Bob Bradley. Bradley and his coaching staff, including Kaczmarek, left in November 2013. On 30 March 2014, Kaczmarek followed Bradley to Norwegian club Stabæk IF, still as his assistant.

On 8 January 2020, Kaczmarek was appointed assistant coach of head coach Kosta Runjaić at Pogoń Szczecin.

On 1 September 2021, he was announced as the manager of Lechia Gdańsk. In his first season in charge, he led Lechia to a 4th-place finish in Ekstraklasa. Exactly a year after his appointment, he was relieved of his duties following a poor start to the campaign, with Lechia crashing out of the UEFA Europa Conference League second qualifying round and at the bottom of the league table, with just one point following six games.

On 10 April 2023, Kaczmarek was appointed manager of Eerste Divisie side Den Bosch on a two-year contract. He was sacked on 11 April 2024, with a record of 7 wins, 10 draws and 23 losses across all competitions.

On 11 June 2024, he joined NAC Breda's coaching staff as an assistant under manager Carl Hoefkens.

On 22 June 2026, Ekstraklasa club Radomiak Radom appointed Kaczmarek as their new manager on a three-year contract. He led the team in seven matches, with a record of three wins, two draws and three losses.

On 8 September 2026, Raków Częstochowa appointed Kaczmarek as head coach on a three-year deal. Raków reportedly paid a fee of €250,000 to release him from his Radomiak contract. At the time of his appointment, Raków were placed at bottom of the league table, with no points after six games played. Kaczmarek started his stint with a 2–1 home victory over Motor Lublin on 11 September. Raków lost the following three games before breaking the streak with a 2–1 away win against Wieczysta Kraków on 16 October. On 19 October, Kaczmarek was dismissed.

== Managerial statistics ==
As of match played 16 October 2026

Managerial record by team and tenure
Team	From	To	Record							
Team	From	To	G	W	D	L	GF	GA	GD	Win %
Viktoria Köln	6 January 2015	30 June 2016	61	35	17	9	124	57	+67	57.38
Stuttgarter Kickers	1 January 2017	17 October 2017	34	14	6	14	58	58	+0	41.18
Fortuna Köln	30 October 2018	22 April 2019	23	5	10	8	21	40	−19	21.74
Lechia Gdańsk	1 September 2021	31 August 2022	40	18	7	15	60	55	+5	45.00
Den Bosch	10 April 2023	11 April 2024	38	6	10	22	33	69	−36	15.79
Radomiak Radom	22 June 2026	8 September 2026	8	3	2	3	7	13	−6	37.50
Raków Częstochowa	8 September 2026	19 October 2026	5	2	0	3	9	12	−3	40.00
Total			209	83	52	74	312	304	+8	39.71

== Honours ==
Viktoria Köln

- Middle Rhine Cup: 2014–15, 2015–16

Individual

- Ekstraklasa Coach of the Month: September 2021
