= Jesaja Herrmann =

German footballer

Personal information
- Full name: Charles-Jesaja Herrmann
- Date of birth: 8 February 2000 (age 26)
- Place of birth: Kiel, Germany
- Height: 1.90 m (6 ft 3 in)
- Position: Forward

Team information
- Current team: SV Babelsberg
- Number: 24

Youth career
- –2014: Hannover 96
- 2014–2019: VfL Wolfsburg

Senior career*
Years	Team	Apps	(Gls)
2019–2021	VfL Wolfsburg II	20	(3)
2021–2023	Kortrijk	13	(0)
2022–2023	→ NAC Breda (loan)	25	(2)
2023–2024	Waldhof Mannheim	21	(3)
2024–2025	SKU Amstetten	26	(6)
2025	Racing Union	10	(3)
2026	1. FC Bocholt	13	(1)
2026–	SV Babelsberg	7	(0)

International career
2015	Germany U15	1	(0)
2015–2016	Germany U16	5	(2)
2016–2017	Germany U17	9	(2)
2017–2018	Germany U18	5	(4)
2018–2019	Germany U19	7	(3)
- * Club domestic league appearances and goals as of 23 September 2026

Charles-Jesaja Herrmann (born 8 February 2000) is a German professional footballer who plays as a forward for SV Babelsberg.

== Career ==
In 2021, Herrmann moved to Belgian side Kortrijk from VfL Wolfsburg in the German Bundesliga, where he said "young players get a lot of opportunities here to develop themselves. I also had proposals from the 2. Bundesliga, but I absolutely wanted to go to Belgium. I immediately noticed how more difficult the preparation is here than in Germany." On 24 July 2021, he debuted for Kortrijk in a 2–0 win over Seraing.

On 14 July 2022, Herrmann was loaned to NAC Breda in the Netherlands.

On 9 August 2023, Herrmann moved to 3. Liga club Waldhof Mannheim.

On 30 July 2024, Herrmann joined SKU Amstetten in Austria.

== Personal life ==
Hermann is the son of the Ghanaian former footballer Charles Akonnor.
