= Boyd Lucassen =

Dutch footballer (born 1998)

Personal information
- Date of birth: 1 July 1998 (age 28)
- Place of birth: Doetinchem, Netherlands
- Height: 1.73 m (5 ft 8 in)
- Position: Right-back

Team information
- Current team: NAC Breda
- Number: 2

Youth career
- 2008–2016: Vitesse

Senior career*
Years	Team	Apps	(Gls)
2016–2019	Jong Vitesse	52	(4)
2019–2022	Go Ahead Eagles	66	(2)
2022–	NAC Breda	102	(7)
- * Club domestic league appearances and goals as of 21 May 2026

Boyd Lucassen (born 1 July 1998) is a Dutch professional footballer who plays as a right-back for Eerste Divisie club NAC Breda.

== Club career ==
Born in Doetinchem, Lucassen played for Vitesse at youth level before making his debut for their reserve team in 2016. On 20 June 2019, Lucassen joined Eerste Divisie club Go Ahead Eagles on a two-year contract with the option for a further season. He made his debut for Go Ahead Eagles on 18 October 2019, coming on as an 87th-minute substitute in a 3–0 victory at home to FC Volendam.

On 10 May 2022, Lucassen signed a three-year contract with NAC Breda.

== Honours ==
Jong Vitesse

- Derde Divisie – Sunday: 2017–18
