= 2022–23 Jong FC Utrecht season =

Jong FC Utrecht
2022–23 season
- Owner: Frans van Seumeren Holding B.V. (99%); Stichting Beheer Aandelen FC Utrecht (1%)
- Chairman: Pieter Leyssius
- Head coach: Darije Kalezić
- Stadium: Sportcomplex Zoudenbalch; Stadion Galgenwaard
- Keuken Kampioen Divisie: 20th
- Top goalscorer: League: Mees Rijks; Derensili Sanches Fernandes (both 8); All: Mees Rijks; Derensili Sanches Fernandes (both 8)
- Highest home attendance: 1,138 (vs. Heracles Almelo, 15 August 2022)
- Lowest home attendance: 222 (vs. FC Dordrecht, 16 January 2023)
- Average home league attendance: 483
- Biggest win: 3–0, 1–4, 4–1 (vs. MVV Maastricht, 14 November 2022) (vs. FC Den Bosch, 6 January 2023) (vs. NAC Breda, 20 February 2023)
- Biggest defeat: 6–1 (vs. Heracles Almelo, 3 February 2023)
| Home colours | Away colours | Third colours |

The 2022–23 season was the 7th season of Jong FC Utrecht at the second level of Dutch football. Before that, they played in the Beloften Eredivisie.

== Players ==
=== U23-team squad ===
As of 9 May 2023

Note: Flags indicate national team as defined under FIFA eligibility rules; some limited exceptions apply. Players may hold more than one non-FIFA nationality.

| No. | Pos. | Nation | Player |
|---|---|---|---|
| — | GK | NED | Mees Ekkink |
| — | GK | NED | Kevin Gadellaa |
| — | GK | NED | Sep van der Heijden |
| — | GK | NED | Fabian de Keijzer |
| — | GK | NED | Thijmen Nijhuis |
| — | GK | NED | Kay Notenboom |
| — | GK | NED | Calvin Raatsie |
| — | GK | NED | Yaell Samson |
| — | GK | NED | Jordy Steins |
| — | DF | NED | Reda Akmum |
| — | DF | NED | Achraf Boumenjal |
| — | DF | NED | Julliani Eersteling |
| — | DF | CUW | Nazjir Held |
| — | DF | NED | Ramon Hendriks |
| — | DF | NED | ~~Kjeld van den Hoek~~ (Note: Left during the season.) |
| — | DF | NED | Ruben Kluivert |
| — | DF | NED | Wessel Kooy |
| — | DF | NED | ~~Djevencio van der Kust~~ |
| — | DF | NED | Yannick Leliendal |
| — | DF | NED | Christopher Mamengi |
| — | DF | NED | ~~Rick Meissen~~ |
| — | DF | AUS | Joshua Rawlins |
| — | DF | NED | Tommy St. Jago |
| — | DF | CUW | Dylan Timber |

| No. | Pos. | Nation | Player |
|---|---|---|---|
| — | DF | NED | Jozhua Vertrouwd |
| — | MF | NED | ~~Oussama Alou~~ |
| — | MF | NED | Rafik El Arguioui |
| — | MF | USA | Taylor Booth |
| — | MF | NED | Lynden Edhart |
| — | MF | NED | Olivier van Eldik |
| — | MF | NED | Yuya Ikeshita |
| — | MF | IDN | Ivar Jenner |
| — | MF | FRA | ~~Albert Lottin~~ |
| — | MF | NED | Eliano Reijnders (on loan from PEC Zwolle) |
| — | MF | EST | Rocco Robert Shein |
| — | MF | NED | Gibson Yah |
| — | FW | MAR | ~~Mohamed Akharaz~~ |
| — | FW | DEN | Tobias Augustinus-Jensen |
| — | FW | BEL | Anthony Descotte |
| — | FW | CUW | Gio-Renys Felicia |
| — | FW | NED | Jesse van de Haar |
| — | FW | NED | Aurelio Oehlers |
| — | FW | NED | ~~Daishawn Redan~~ |
| — | FW | NED | Mees Rijks |
| — | FW | NED | Derensili Sanches Fernandes |
| — | FW | NED | Dion Versluis |
| — | FW | FRA | ~~Arthur Zagre~~ |

== Transfers ==
=== Summer ===
==== Transfers in ====
| Nat. | Pos. | Player | Transferred from | Particularities | Ref. |
|---|---|---|---|---|---|
| (Netherlands) NED | MF | Lynden Edhart | (Netherlands) ADO Den Haag U18 | Transfer free | |
| (Curaçao) CUW | FW | Gio-Renys Felicia | (Netherlands) Feyenoord U18 | Transfer free | |
| (Netherlands) NED | DF | Yannick Leliendal | (Netherlands) VVV-Venlo | Transfer free | |
| (Australia) AUS | DF | Joshua Rawlins | (Australia) Perth Glory | Transfer free | |
| (Netherlands) NED | GK | Jordy Steins | (Germany) Alemannia Aachen U17 | Transfer free | |
| (Netherlands) NED | DF | Jozhua Vertrouwd | (Netherlands) FC Volendam | Transfer free | |
| (Netherlands) NED | MF | Gibson Yah | (Netherlands) Jong Ajax | Transfer free | |
| (Netherlands) NED | MF | Eliano Reijnders | (Netherlands) PEC Zwolle | On loan (+option to buy) | |
| (Netherlands) NED | MF | Davy van den Berg | (Netherlands) FC Utrecht | Internal transfer | |
| (Netherlands) NED | DF | Christopher Mamengi | (Netherlands) FC Utrecht | Internal transfer | |
| (Morocco) MAR | FW | Mohamed Akharaz | (Netherlands) FC Utrecht U18 | Internal transfer | |
| (Netherlands) NED | DF | Achraf Boumenjal | (Netherlands) FC Utrecht U18 | Internal transfer | |
| (Netherlands) NED | GK | Sep van der Heijden | (Netherlands) FC Utrecht U18 | Internal transfer | |
| (Indonesia) IDN | MF | Ivar Jenner | (Netherlands) FC Utrecht U18 | Internal transfer | |
| (Netherlands) NED | MF | Olivier van Eldik | (Netherlands) FC Utrecht U18 | Internal transfer | |
| (Netherlands) NED | FW | Dion Versluis | (Netherlands) FC Utrecht U18 | Internal transfer | |
| (Netherlands) NED | MF | Rayan El Azrak | (Netherlands) VVV-Venlo | Back from loan | |
| (Netherlands) NED | FW | Nick Venema | (Netherlands) VVV-Venlo | Back from loan | |

==== Transfers out ====
| Nat. | Pos. | Player | Transferred to | Particularities | Ref. |
|---|---|---|---|---|---|
| (Netherlands) NED | MF | Davy van den Berg | (Netherlands) PEC Zwolle | Sold | |
| (Netherlands) NED | FW | Nick Venema | (Netherlands) VVV-Venlo | Sold | |
| (Netherlands) NED | MF | Rida El Barjiji | Without club | Transfer free | |
| (Curaçao) CUW | FW | Juruël Bernadina | (Netherlands) Go Ahead Eagles U21 | Transfer free | |
| (Netherlands) NED | DF | Gabriël Culhaci | (Netherlands) Helmond Sport | Transfer free | |
| (Netherlands) NED | GK | Joey Houweling | (Netherlands) Telstar | Transfer free | |
| (Indonesia) INA | FW | Bagus Kahfi | (Greece) Asteras Tripolis | Transfer free | |
| (Netherlands) NED | FW | Eros Maddy | (Netherlands) Helmond Sport | Transfer free | |
| (Netherlands) NED | GK | Jord Ruijgrok | (Netherlands) De Graafschap U21 | Transfer free | |
| (Netherlands) NED | FW | Danilio Ruperti | Without club | Transfer free | |
| (Netherlands) NED | FW | Elijah Velland | (Netherlands) ADO Den Haag U21 | Transfer free | |
| (Netherlands) NED | MF | Oussama Alou | Without club | Contract terminated | |
| (Netherlands) NED | MF | Rayan El Azrak | Without club | Contract terminated | |
| (Netherlands) NED | MF | Imanuel Bonsu | Without club | Contract terminated | |
| (Netherlands) NED | DF | Raymond Huizing | (Netherlands) Sparta Nijkerk | Contract terminated | |
| (Netherlands) NED | FW | Ayman Sellouf | Without club | Contract terminated | |
| (Netherlands) NED | DF | Ruben Kluivert | (Netherlands) FC Utrecht | Internal transfer | |
| (Netherlands) NED | DF | Djevencio van der Kust | (Netherlands) FC Utrecht | Internal transfer | |
| (Netherlands) NED | FW | Mohamed Mallahi | (Netherlands) Roda JC Kerkrade | On loan | |
| (Netherlands) NED | DF | Joshua Mukeh | (Netherlands) TOP Oss | On loan | |
| (Estonia) EST | MF | Rocco Robert Shein | (Estonia) FC Flora | Back from loan | |

=== Winter ===
==== Transfers in ====
| Nat. | Pos. | Player | Transferred from | Particularities | Ref. |
|---|---|---|---|---|---|
| (Denmark) DEN | FW | Tobias Augustinus-Jensen | (Denmark) Odense BK | Purchased | |

==== Transfers out ====
| Nat. | Pos. | Player | Transferred to | Particularities | Ref. |
|---|---|---|---|---|---|
| (Netherlands) NED | DF | Kjeld van den Hoek | (Netherlands) Jong Sparta Rotterdam | Sold | |
| (Netherlands) NED | DF | Rick Meissen | (Netherlands) Sparta Rotterdam | Sold | |
| (France) FRA | MF | Albert Lottin | Without club | Contract terminated | |
| (Morocco) MAR | FW | Mohamed Akharaz | (Netherlands) ADO Den Haag U21 | On loan | |

== Pre-season and friendlies ==
Win Draw Loss Fixtures

| 2 July 2022 Friendly | Jong FC Utrecht (Netherlands) | 4–0 | (Germany) Borussia Mönchengladbach II | Utrecht, Netherlands |
| 14:00 CEST (UTC+2) | Rijks 10'; Bourebaba 54'; Akharaz 59'; Sellouf 69' | Report | Beckhoff (yellow card) | Stadium: Sportcomplex Zoudenbalch; Attendance: 400; Referee: Unknown |

| 9 July 2022 Friendly | Jong Zeeland (Netherlands) | 0–6 | (Netherlands) Jong FC Utrecht | Burgh-Haamstede, Netherlands |
| 15:30 CEST (UTC+2) | | Report | Felicia 3', 27'; Van Soest 35'; Versluis 66'; Akharaz 82'; Edhart 90' | Stadium: Sportpark van Zuijen; Attendance: Unknown; Referee: Unknown |

| 13 July 2022 Friendly | Jong FC Utrecht (Netherlands) | 0–3 | (Belgium) KMSK Deinze | Utrecht, Netherlands |
| 14:00 CEST (UTC+2) | | Report | Carcela-Gonzalez 38', 51'; De Belder 49' (pen.) | Stadium: Sportcomplex Zoudenbalch; Attendance: Unknown; Referee: Unknown |

| 17 July 2022 Friendly | Wuppertaler SV (Germany) | 2–2 | (Netherlands) Jong FC Utrecht | Wuppertal, Germany |
| 14:00 CEST (UTC+2) | Stiepermann 11' (pen.); Galle 35' | Report | Leliendal (yellow card); Felicia 6'; Cejas 43' | Stadium: Stadion am Zoo; Attendance: Unknown; Referee: Unknown |

| 23 July 2022 Friendly | Go Ahead Eagles (Netherlands) | 0–2 | (Netherlands) Jong FC Utrecht | Deventer, Netherlands |
| 19:00 CEST (UTC+2) | | Report | Sanches Fernandes 17'; Rijks 33' | Stadium: Unknown; Attendance: Unknown; Referee: Unknown |

| 29 July 2022 Friendly | Jong FC Utrecht (Netherlands) | 1–1 | (Netherlands) SV TEC | Utrecht, Netherlands |
| 19:30 CEST (UTC+2) | Alou 45' | Report | El Idrissi 4' | Stadium: Sportcomplex Zoudenbalch; Attendance: Unknown; Referee: Unknown |

| 30 July 2022 Friendly | LOSC Lille U23 (France) | 1–1 | (Netherlands) Jong FC Utrecht | Lille, France |
| 15:00 CEST (UTC+2) | Unknown | Report | Versluis | Stadium: Unknown; Attendance: Unknown; Referee: Unknown |

| 20 August 2022 Friendly | Excelsior Rotterdam (Netherlands) | 1–2 | (Netherlands) Jong FC Utrecht | Rotterdam, Netherlands |
| Unknown CEST (UTC+2) | Unknown | Report | Maeda; Sellouf | Stadium: Van Donge & De Roo Stadion; Attendance: 0 Referee: Unknown |
Note: Behind closed doors.

| 22 September 2022 Friendly | FC Den Bosch (Netherlands) | 4–2 | (Netherlands) Jong FC Utrecht | 's-Hertogenbosch, Netherlands |
| Unknown CEST (UTC+2) | Halilovic 2', 15'; Van Bakel 10'; Cordoba 74' | Report | Edhart 46'; Rijks 51' | Stadium: Stadion De Vliert; Attendance: 0 Referee: Unknown |
Note: Behind closed doors.

| 1 November 2022 Friendly | Jong FC Utrecht (Netherlands) | 2–1 | (Netherlands) Jong Sparta Rotterdam | Utrecht, Netherlands |
| 13:00 CET (UTC+1) | Akmum 11'; Rijks 54' | Report | Brouwer 1' | Stadium: Sportcomplex Zoudenbalch; Attendance: Unknown; Referee: Unknown |

| 8 November 2022 Friendly | Jong FC Utrecht (Netherlands) | 1–1 | (Netherlands) Excelsior Rotterdam | Utrecht, Netherlands |
| 13:00 CET (UTC+1) | Van Eldik 90' | Report | Agrafiotis 17' | Stadium: Sportcomplex Zoudenbalch; Attendance: Unknown; Referee: Unknown |

| 25 November 2022 Friendly | Viktoria Köln (Germany) | 4–1 | (Netherlands) Jong FC Utrecht | Unknown, Germany |
| Unknown CET (UTC+1) | Becker 42'; Handle 68'; Siebert 86'; Stehle 90' | Report | Sanches Fernandes 38' | Stadium: Unknown; Attendance: Unknown; Referee: Unknown |

| 1 December 2022 Friendly | FC Den Bosch (Netherlands) | 1–1 | (Netherlands) Jong FC Utrecht | 's-Hertogenbosch, Netherlands |
| 13:00 CET (UTC+1) | Hammouti 4' | Report | Edhart 25' | Stadium: De Vliert; Attendance: 0 Referee: Unknown |
Note: Behind closed doors.

| 25 January 2023 Friendly | Willem II (Netherlands) | 1–0 | (Netherlands) Jong FC Utrecht | Rosmalen, Netherlands |
| Unknown CET (UTC+1) | Svensson 83' | Report | | Stadium: Voetbalcomplex De Groote Wielen; Attendance: Unknown; Referee: Unknown |

| 23 March 2023 Friendly | ADO Den Haag (Netherlands) | 1–3 | (Netherlands) FC Utrecht | The Hague, Netherlands |
| 13:30 CET (UTC+1) | Komljenovic 67' | Report | Augustinus-Jensen 64'; Reijnders 70'; Ikeshita 74' | Stadium: Bingoal Stadion; Attendance: 0 Referee: Unknown |
Note: Behind closed doors.

== Competition ==
=== Overall record ===
| Competition | First match | Last match | Starting round | Record | | | | | | | |
| Competition | First match | Last match | Starting round | Pld | W | D | L | GF | GA | GD | Win % |
|---|---|---|---|---|---|---|---|---|---|---|---|
| Keuken Kampioen Divisie | 5 August 2022 | 19 May 2023 | Matchday 1 | 38 | 7 | 7 | 24 | 33 | 65 | −32 | 18.42 |
| Total | | | | 38 | 7 | 7 | 24 | 33 | 65 | −32 | 18.42 |

Last updated: 20 May 2023
Source: Soccerway

=== Keuken Kampioen Divisie ===
==== League table ====
| Pos | Team | Pld | W | D | L | GF | GA | GD | Pts | Promotion or qualification |
|---|---|---|---|---|---|---|---|---|---|---|
| 16 | Helmond Sport | 38 | 11 | 10 | 17 | 39 | 57 | −18 | 43 | |
| 17 | TOP Oss | 38 | 10 | 7 | 21 | 45 | 76 | −31 | 37 | |
| 18 | Dordrecht | 38 | 9 | 8 | 21 | 41 | 68 | −27 | 35 | |
| 19 | Den Bosch | 38 | 10 | 5 | 23 | 46 | 85 | −39 | 35 | |
| 20 | Jong FC Utrecht | 38 | 7 | 7 | 24 | 33 | 65 | −32 | 28 | Reserve teams are not eligible to be promoted to the Eredivisie |

Source: Soccerway, Keuken Kampioen Divisie (in Dutch)
Rules for classification: Season in progress: 1) Most points won; 2) Less points lost; 3) Goal difference; 4) Goals scored; 5) Alphabetical order; End of season: 1) Points; 2) Goal difference; 3) Goals scored; 4) Head-to-head points; 5) Head-to-head goal difference; 6) Head-to-head away goals scored; 7) Play-off if relevant for deciding champion, relegation or participating in a European league, otherwise by draw. 8) Penalty shoot-out (only after a play-off)

===== Period 1 =====
| Pos | Team | Pld | W | D | L | GF | GA | GD | Pts | Qualification |
|---|---|---|---|---|---|---|---|---|---|---|
| 16 | TOP Oss | 10 | 3 | 1 | 6 | 12 | 16 | −4 | 10 | |
| 17 | Helmond Sport | 10 | 3 | 0 | 7 | 9 | 14 | −5 | 9 | |
| 18 | Den Bosch | 10 | 3 | 0 | 7 | 13 | 19 | −6 | 9 | |
| 19 | De Graafschap | 10 | 2 | 2 | 6 | 13 | 19 | −6 | 8 | |
| 20 | Jong FC Utrecht | 10 | 1 | 3 | 6 | 8 | 18 | −10 | 6 | Reserves teams cannot participate in the promotion play-offs |

Source: Keuken Kampioen Divisie (in Dutch)
Rules for classification: 1) points; 2) goal difference; 3) number of goals scored

===== Period 2 =====
| Pos | Team | Pld | W | D | L | GF | GA | GD | Pts | Qualification |
|---|---|---|---|---|---|---|---|---|---|---|
| 14 | NAC Breda | 9 | 3 | 1 | 5 | 12 | 16 | −4 | 10 | |
| 15 | Helmond Sport | 9 | 3 | 1 | 5 | 6 | 18 | −12 | 10 | |
| 16 | Jong FC Utrecht | 9 | 3 | 0 | 6 | 11 | 14 | −3 | 9 | Reserves teams cannot participate in the promotion play-offs |
| 17 | ADO Den Haag | 9 | 2 | 3 | 4 | 9 | 13 | −4 | 9 | |
| 18 | Dordrecht | 9 | 2 | 2 | 5 | 11 | 22 | −11 | 8 | |

Source: Keuken Kampioen Divisie (in Dutch)
Rules for classification: 1) points; 2) goal difference; 3) number of goals scored

===== Period 3 =====
| Pos | Team | Pld | W | D | L | GF | GA | GD | Pts | Qualification |
|---|---|---|---|---|---|---|---|---|---|---|
| 16 | Den Bosch | 9 | 2 | 2 | 5 | 10 | 32 | −22 | 8 | |
| 17 | Dordrecht | 9 | 2 | 1 | 6 | 8 | 12 | −4 | 7 | |
| 18 | MVV Maastricht | 9 | 2 | 1 | 6 | 16 | 21 | −5 | 7 | |
| 19 | Jong FC Utrecht | 9 | 1 | 2 | 6 | 8 | 17 | −9 | 5 | Reserves teams cannot participate in the promotion play-offs |
| 20 | Jong Ajax | 9 | 1 | 2 | 6 | 11 | 21 | −10 | 5 | Reserves teams cannot participate in the promotion play-offs |

Source: Keuken Kampioen Divisie (in Dutch)
Rules for classification: 1) points; 2) goal difference; 3) number of goals scored

===== Period 4 =====
| Pos | Team | Pld | W | D | L | GF | GA | GD | Pts | Qualification |
|---|---|---|---|---|---|---|---|---|---|---|
| 16 | Dordrecht | 10 | 2 | 3 | 5 | 10 | 20 | −10 | 9 | |
| 17 | Den Bosch | 10 | 2 | 2 | 6 | 9 | 16 | −7 | 8 | |
| 18 | Jong FC Utrecht | 10 | 2 | 2 | 6 | 6 | 16 | −10 | 8 | Reserves teams cannot participate in the promotion play-offs |
| 19 | TOP Oss | 10 | 1 | 4 | 5 | 12 | 27 | −15 | 7 | |
| 20 | Roda JC Kerkrade | 10 | 1 | 3 | 6 | 11 | 20 | −9 | 6 | |

Source: Keuken Kampioen Divisie (in Dutch)
Rules for classification: 1) points; 2) goal difference; 3) number of goals scored

==== Results summary ====
| Overall | | | | | | | | Home | | | | | | Away | | | | | |
| Pld | W | D | L | GF | GA | GD | Pts | W | D | L | GF | GA | GD | W | D | L | GF | GA | GD |
|---|---|---|---|---|---|---|---|---|---|---|---|---|---|---|---|---|---|---|---|
| 38 | 7 | 7 | 24 | 33 | 65 | −32 | 28 | 5 | 5 | 9 | 18 | 21 | −3 | 2 | 2 | 15 | 15 | 44 | −29 |

Last updated: 20 May 2023.
Source: Eerste divisie

==== Results by round ====
| Round | 1 | 2 | 3 | 4 | 5 | 6 | 7 | 8 | 9 | 10 | 11 | 12 | 13 | 14 | 15 | 16 | 17 | 18 | 19 | 20 | 21 | 22 | 23 | 24 | 25 | 26 | 27 | 28 | 29 | 30 | 31 | 32 | 33 | 34 | 35 | 36 | 37 | 38 |
|---|---|---|---|---|---|---|---|---|---|---|---|---|---|---|---|---|---|---|---|---|---|---|---|---|---|---|---|---|---|---|---|---|---|---|---|---|---|---|
| Ground | A | H | A | H | A | H | A | H | A | H | A | H | A | H | H | A | A | H | A | H | A | H | A | H | H | A | H | A | A | H | A | H | A | H | A | H | A | H |
| Result | L | L | L | D | L | W | L | D | D | L | L | L | L | L | W | L | W | L | W | L | D | D | L | L | W | L | L | L | L | L | L | W | L | W | L | D | L | D |
| Position | 18 | 19 | 19 | 19 | 20 | 18 | 20 | 20 | 20 | 20 | 20 | 20 | 20 | 20 | 20 | 20 | 20 | 20 | 20 | 20 | 20 | 20 | 20 | 20 | 20 | 20 | 20 | 20 | 20 | 20 | 20 | 20 | 20 | 20 | 20 | 20 | 20 | 20 |

Updated to match(es) played on 20 May 2023. Source: Eerste divisie
A = Away; H = Home; W = Win; D = Draw; L = Loss

==== Matches ====
The league fixtures were announced on 17 June 2022.

| 5 August 2022 1 | TOP Oss | 3–0 | Jong FC Utrecht | Oss |
| 20:00 CEST (UTC+2) | Margaritha 11', (yellow card) 71'; Mathieu 38' (pen.), 84' (pen.); Dekker (yellow card) 81' | Report | Timber (yellow card) 37' | Stadium: Frans Heesen Stadion; Attendance: 1,000; Referee: Jesse Rozendal |

| 15 August 2022 2 | Jong FC Utrecht | 0–3 | Heracles Almelo | Utrecht |
| 20:00 CEST (UTC+2) | Ikeshita (yellow card) 55'; Yah (yellow card) 62'; Edhart (yellow card) 82' | Report | Laursen 9', 41'; Armenteros 36' | Stadium: Stadion Galgenwaard; Attendance: 1,138; Referee: Luuk Timmer |

| 19 August 2022 3 | FC Dordrecht | 2–1 | Jong FC Utrecht | Dordrecht |
| 20:00 CEST (UTC+2) | El Azzouzi 7'; Longo 36'; Van der Avert (yellow card) 45+1'; Tremour (yellow card) 73'; Koswal (yellow card) 90+5' | Report | Versluis 2'; Mamengi (yellow card) 63' | Stadium: Matchoholic Stadion; Attendance: 1,545; Referee: Robin Vereijken |

| 29 August 2022 4 | Jong FC Utrecht | 0–0 | Willem II | Utrecht |
| 20:00 CEST (UTC+2) | Felicia (yellow card) 85' | Report | Woudenberg (yellow card) 49'; Lesquoy (yellow card) 85'; Dammers (yellow card) 85' | Stadium: Stadion Galgenwaard; Attendance: 1,016; Referee: Martin Pérez |

| 2 September 2022 5 | VVV-Venlo | 2–1 | Jong FC Utrecht | Venlo |
| 20:00 CEST (UTC+2) | Braken 24'; Verheijen (yellow card) 36'; Yasar (yellow card) 80'; Roemer (yellow card) 87'; Van Rooijen (yellow card) 90'; Koglin 90+3' | Report | Ikeshita (yellow card) 42'; Eersteling (yellow card) 45'; Mamengi 52'; Leliendal (yellow card) 85' | Stadium: De Koel; Attendance: 3,786; Referee: Michael Eijgelsheim |

| 9 September 2022 6 | Jong FC Utrecht | 2–0 | Helmond Sport | Utrecht |
| 20:00 CEST (UTC+2) | Ikeshita 45+2'; Lottin 86' | Report | Chacon (yellow card) 45+1'; Van Hove (yellow card) 90+3' | Stadium: Sportcomplex Zoudenbalch; Attendance: 301; Referee: Jesse Rozendal |

| 12 September 2022 8 | Jong FC Utrecht | 1–1 | ADO Den Haag | Utrecht |
| 20:00 CEST (UTC+2) | Lottin (yellow card) 57'; Sanches Fernandes 69'; Meissen (yellow card) 88' | Report | Breinburg (yellow card) 39'; Asante (yellow card) 63'; Owusu 89' | Stadium: Stadion Galgenwaard; Attendance: 513; Referee: Clay Ruperti |

| 16 September 2022 7 | NAC Breda | 3–1 | Jong FC Utrecht | Breda |
| 20:00 CEST (UTC+2) | Lucassen 13', 56'; Vet (yellow card) 33'; Velanas 58', (yellow card) 63' | Report | Lottin 7'; Mamengi (yellow card) 17'; Sanches Fernandes (yellow card) 19'; Zagre (yellow card) 26' | Stadium: Rat Verlegh Stadion; Attendance: 15,624; Referee: Laurens Gerrets |

| 30 September 2022 9 | Telstar | 2–2 | Jong FC Utrecht | Velsen-Zuid |
| 20:00 CEST (UTC+2) | Min 20'; Najah (yellow card) 34'; Giousis 65' | Report | Ikeshita (yellow card) 35'; Sanches Fernandes 64' (pen.); Vertrouwd (yellow card) 78'; Edhart 84'; Versluis (yellow card) 87'; Lottin (red card) 90+2' | Stadium: BUKO Stadion; Attendance: 1,644; Referee: Wouter Wiersma |

| 7 October 2022 10 | Jong FC Utrecht | 0–2 | Almere City FC | Utrecht |
| 20:00 CEST (UTC+2) | Sanches Fernandes (yellow card) 44' | Report | Esajas (yellow card) 53'; Van Bruggen (yellow card) 55'; Akujobi 56'; Hilterman 63'; Royo (yellow card) 65' | Stadium: Sportcomplex Zoudenbalch; Attendance: 341; Referee: Luuk Timmer |

| 14 October 2022 11 | De Graafschap | 2–0 | Jong FC Utrecht | Doetinchem |
| 20:00 CEST (UTC+2) | Gravenberch 11'; Büttner 26' | Report | Mamengi (yellow card) 30' | Stadium: De Vijverberg; Attendance: 9,754; Referee: Richard Martens |

| 24 October 2022 12 | Jong FC Utrecht | 0–1 | PEC Zwolle | Utrecht |
| 20:00 CEST (UTC+2) | Van der Kust (yellow card) 66' | Report | Taha (yellow card) 33'; Van den Belt 67' | Stadium: Stadion Galgenwaard; Attendance: 741; Referee: Nick Smit |

| 28 October 2022 13 | Roda JC Kerkrade | 4–1 | Jong FC Utrecht | Kerkrade |
| 20:00 CEST (UTC+2) | Van der Heide 26'; Postema 56'; Limbombe (yellow card) 61'; Vente 63'; Lambrix (yellow card) 64'; Joppen (yellow card) 68'; Sieben 70' | Report | Rijks 5', (yellow card) 35' (yellow-red card) 40'; Ikeshita (yellow card) 50' | Stadium: Parkstad Limburg Stadion; Attendance: 6,420; Referee: Alex Bos |

| 7 November 2022 14 | Jong FC Utrecht | 0–1 | FC Eindhoven | Utrecht |
| 20:00 CET (UTC+1) | Lottin (yellow card) 80'; Meissen (yellow card) 82'; De Keijzer (yellow card) 82' | Report | Seedorf (yellow card) 71' (yellow-red card) 90+3'; De Keersmaecker (yellow card) 76'; Brym 81' | Stadium: Sportcomplex Zoudenbalch; Attendance: 281; Referee: Michael Eijgelsheim |

| 14 November 2022 15 | Jong FC Utrecht | 3–0 | MVV Maastricht | Utrecht |
| 20:00 CET (UTC+1) | Sanches Fernandes 15', (yellow card) 33'; Shein (yellow card) 20'; Rijks 50', 57'; Ikeshita (yellow card) 67' | Report | Remans (yellow card) 76' | Stadium: Sportcomplex Zoudenbalch; Attendance: 556; Referee: Stan Teuben |

| 17 November 2022 16 | Jong PSV | 2–1 | Jong FC Utrecht | Eindhoven |
| 18:45 CET (UTC+1) | Antonisse 72', 90+2', (yellow card) 90+3'; Nassoh (yellow card) 86' | Report | Sanches Fernandes 21'; El Arguioui (yellow card) 34' | Stadium: De Herdgang; Attendance: 327; Referee: Luuk Timmer |

| 11 December 2022 17 | Jong Ajax | 1–2 | Jong FC Utrecht | Amsterdam |
| 14:30 CET (UTC+1) | Hlynsson 41'; Gooijer (yellow card) 45+2' | Report | Reijnders (yellow card) 30'; Mamengi 40'; Ikeshita (yellow card) 54' (yellow-red card) 82'; Rawlins (yellow card) 70'; Rijks 73' | Stadium: Sportpark De Toekomst; Attendance: 1,008; Referee: Wouter Wiersma |

| 6 January 2023 19 | FC Den Bosch | 1–4 | Jong FC Utrecht | 's-Hertogenbosch |
| 20:00 CET (UTC+1) | Van der Heijden (yellow card) 28'; Patoulidis (yellow card) 30'; Hammouti (yellow card) 56'; Konings 67' | Report | Eersteling 25'; Sanches Fernandes 61', 88'; Rijks (yellow card) 73', (goal) 90+3' | Stadium: De Vliert; Attendance: 4,484; Referee: Kevin Puts |

| 9 January 2023 18 | Jong FC Utrecht | 0–2 | Jong AZ | Utrecht |
| 20:00 CET (UTC+1) | Eersteling (yellow card) 54'; Nijhuis (yellow card) 75'; Boumenjal (yellow card) 87' | Report | Barasi 76' (pen.), (yellow card) 76', (goal) 88' (pen.) | Stadium: Sportcomplex Zoudenbalch; Attendance: 271; Referee: Robin Vereijken |

| 16 January 2023 20 | Jong FC Utrecht | 0–1 | FC Dordrecht | Utrecht |
| 20:00 CET (UTC+1) | Redan (yellow card) 90+4' | Report | Balde 4', (yellow card) 69'; Camara (yellow card) 75'; Doesburg (yellow card) 81'; Bossin (yellow card) 90+4'; Tremour (yellow card) 90+5' | Stadium: Sportcomplex Zoudenbalch; Attendance: 222; Referee: Jesse Rozendal |

| 22 January 2023 21 | ADO Den Haag | 1–1 | Jong FC Utrecht | The Hague |
| 12:15 CET (UTC+1) | Verheydt 30'; Absalem (yellow card) 90' | Report | Mamengi (yellow card) 57'; Rijks 66'; Oehlers (yellow card) 81'; Vertrouwd (yellow card) 84'; Felicia (yellow card) 90+5' | Stadium: Bingoal Stadion; Attendance: 4,950; Referee: Wouter Wiersma |

| 30 January 2023 22 | Jong FC Utrecht | 1–1 | De Graafschap | Utrecht |
| 20:00 CET (UTC+1) | Oehlers 25' | Report | Hillen 58' | Stadium: Sportcomplex Zoudenbalch; Attendance: 530; Referee: Martijn Vos |

| 3 February 2023 23 | Heracles Almelo | 6–1 | Jong FC Utrecht | Almelo |
| 20:00 CET (UTC+1) | Laursen 8' (pen.); Hoogma 23'; Ouahim 24', (yellow card) 32'; Hansson 34'; Wehmeyer 64', 73'; Bruns (yellow card) 74' | Report | Mamengi (yellow card) 7'; Rijks 58' | Stadium: [Erve Asito]] Attendance: 9,940; Referee: Jannick van der Laan |

| 13 February 2023 24 | Jong FC Utrecht | 0–1 | Telstar | Utrecht |
| 20:00 CET (UTC+1) | Shein (yellow card) 83' | Report | Overtoom 50' | Stadium: Sportcomplex Zoudenbalch; Attendance: 362; Referee: Luuk Timmer |

| 20 February 2023 25 | Jong FC Utrecht | 4–1 | NAC Breda | Utrecht |
| 20:00 CET (UTC+1) | Sanches Fernandes 13', 68'; Edhart (yellow card) 30'; Leliendal 37'; Descotte 67'; Mamengi (yellow card) 78' | Report | Velthuis 4'; Martina (yellow card) 50' | Stadium: Stadion Galgenwaard; Attendance: 611; Referee: Stan Teuben |

| 24 February 2023 26 | Helmond Sport | 2–0 | Jong FC Utrecht | Helmond |
| 20:00 CET (UTC+1) | Lieftink 35'; Van der Meer (yellow card) 78'; Scholten 84' | Report | | Stadium: GS Staalwerken Stadion; Attendance: 1,211; Referee: Kevin Puts |

| 6 March 2023 27 | Jong FC Utrecht | 1–3 | Roda JC Kerkrade | Utrecht |
| 20:00 CET (UTC+1) | Descotte 62' (pen.); Yah (yellow card) 70'; Shein (yellow card) 82' | Report | Vente 22' (pen.), 63'; Schuurman (yellow card) 53'; Reith (yellow card) 89'; Limbombe 90+4' | Stadium: Sportcomplex Zoudenbalch; Attendance: 233; Referee: Clay Ruperti |

| 13 March 2023 30 | Jong FC Utrecht | 0–1 | Jong PSV | Utrecht |
| 20:00 CET (UTC+1) | Leliendal (yellow card) 26' | Report | Leysen (yellow card) 38'; Van Duiven (penalty missed) 52', (yellow card) 90'; Tielemans (yellow card) 56', (goal) 87' (pen.); Nassoh (yellow card) 76' | Stadium: Sportcomplex Zoudenbalch; Attendance: 351; Referee: Wouter Wiersma |

| 17 March 2023 29 | MVV Maastricht | 1–0 | Jong FC Utrecht | Maastricht |
| 20:00 CET (UTC+1) | Steuckers 77'; Essers (yellow card) 89' | Report | Edhart (yellow card) 69'; Timber (yellow card) 71'; Leliendal (yellow card) 89' | Stadium: Stadion De Geusselt; Attendance: 5,387; Referee: Michael Eijgelsheim |

| 31 March 2023 31 | PEC Zwolle | 2–0 | Jong FC Utrecht | Zwolle |
| 20:00 CEST (UTC+2) | Thy 58', 90+2'; Van den Berg (yellow card) 72' | Report | Vertrouwd (yellow card) 36'; Eersteling (yellow card) 90+4' | Stadium: MAC³PARK Stadion; Attendance: 12,500; Referee: Robin Gansner |

| 3 April 2023 28 | Almere City FC | 1–0 | Jong FC Utrecht | Almere |
| 20:00 CEST (UTC+2) | Limbombe (yellow card) 39'; Van Bruggen 87' | Report | Shein (yellow card) 39' | Stadium: Yanmar Stadion; Attendance: 2,731; Referee: Rob Dieperink |

| 10 April 2023 32 | Jong FC Utrecht | 4–2 | TOP Oss | Utrecht |
| 20:00 CEST (UTC+2) | Kluivert (yellow card) 5'; Rijks 12' (pen.); Hilderink 16' (o.g.); Augustinus-Jensen 31'; Jenner (yellow card) 50'; Van de Haar 90+4' | Report | Mathieu 8', (yellow card) 23'; Margaritha 90+1' | Stadium: Sportcomplex Zoudenbalch; Attendance: 303; Referee: Jesse Rozendal |

| 17 April 2023 33 | Jong AZ | 4–0 | Jong FC Utrecht | Wijdewormer |
| 20:00 CEST (UTC+2) | Meerdink 23', 45'; Stam (yellow card) 58'; De Jong 68'; Esajas (yellow card) 80'; Barasi 82' (pen.) | Report | Boumenjal (yellow card) 19' (yellow-red card) 62'; Jenner (yellow card) 53'; Yah (yellow card) 74' | Stadium: AFAS Trainingscomplex; Attendance: 447; Referee: Kevin Puts |

| 24 April 2023 34 | Jong FC Utrecht | 1–0 | Jong Ajax | Utrecht |
| 20:00 CEST (UTC+2) | Rawlins (yellow card) 30'; Timber (yellow card) 90+5'; Descotte 90+7' (pen.) | Report | Vos (yellow card) 61'; Warmerdam (yellow card) 88'; Baas (yellow card) 90+3'; Banel (red card) 90+6' | Stadium: Sportcomplex Zoudenbalch; Attendance: 345; Referee: Wouter Wiersma |

| 28 April 2023 35 | FC Eindhoven | 2–0 | Jong FC Utrecht | Eindhoven |
| 20:00 CEST (UTC+2) | Bannis 6'; Brym 24'; Van Doorm (yellow card) 74' | Report | Jenner (yellow card) 11'; Reijnders (yellow card) 56' | Stadium: Jan Louwers Stadion; Attendance: 2,381; Referee: Luuk Timmer |

| 8 May 2023 36 | Jong FC Utrecht | 0–0 | FC Den Bosch | Utrecht |
| 20:00 CEST (UTC+2) | St. Jago (yellow card) 50'; Felicia (yellow card) 90' | Report | Hammouti (yellow card) 22' | Stadium: Stadion Galgenwaard; Attendance: 532; Referee: Michael Eijgelsheim |

| 12 May 2023 37 | Willem II | 3–0 | Jong FC Utrecht | Tilburg |
| 20:00 CEST (UTC+2) | Bosch (yellow card) 45'; Hornkamp 77'; Dammers 80'; Bokila 89' | Report | Boumenjal (yellow card) 58' | Stadium: Koning Willem II Stadion; Attendance: 13,278; Referee: Robin Gansner |

| 19 May 2023 38 | Jong FC Utrecht | 1–1 | VVV-Venlo | Utrecht |
| 20:00 CEST (UTC+2) | Jenner (yellow card) 82'; Edhart 89' | Report | Braken 33' (pen.); Klaasen (yellow card) 84'; Allouch (yellow card) 90+5' | Stadium: Sportcomplex Zoudenbalch; Attendance: 525; Referee: Kevin Puts |

== Statistics ==
=== Goalscorers ===
Friendlies

| No. | Name | Goal |
|---|---|---|
| 1. | (Netherlands) Mees Rijks | 4 |
| 2. | (Netherlands) Lynden Edhart | 3 |
| 2. | (Curaçao) Gio-Renys Felicia | 3 |
| 4. | (Morocco) Mohamed Akharaz | 2 |
| 4. | (Netherlands) Derensili Sanches Fernandes | 2 |
| 4. | (Netherlands) Ayman Sellouf | 2 |
| 4. | (Netherlands) Dion Versluis | 2 |
| 8. | (Netherlands) Reda Akmum | 1 |
| 8. | (Netherlands) Oussama Alou | 1 |
| 8. | (Denmark) Tobias Augustinus-Jensen | 1 |
| 8. | (France) Zineddine Bourebaba | 1 |
| 8. | (Argentina) Pedro Cejas | 1 |
| 8. | (Netherlands) Olivier van Eldik | 1 |
| 8. | (Netherlands) Yuya Ikeshita | 1 |
| 8. | (Japan) Naoki Maeda | 1 |
| 8. | (Netherlands) Eliano Reijnders | 1 |
| 8. | (Netherlands) Dani van Soest | 1 |
| Own goals opponent | | – |
| Totals | | 28 |

(Netherlands) Keuken Kampioen Divisie

| No. | Name | Goal |
|---|---|---|
| 1. | (Netherlands) Mees Rijks | 8 |
| 1. | (Netherlands) Derensili Sanches Fernandes | 8 |
| 3. | (Belgium) Anthony Descotte | 3 |
| 4. | (Netherlands) Lynden Edhart | 2 |
| 4. | (France) Albert Lottin | 2 |
| 4. | (Netherlands) Christopher Mamengi | 2 |
| 7. | (Denmark) Tobias Augustinus-Jensen | 1 |
| 7. | (Netherlands) Julliani Eersteling | 1 |
| 7. | (Netherlands) Jesse van de Haar | 1 |
| 7. | (Netherlands) Yuya Ikeshita | 1 |
| 7. | (Netherlands) Yannick Leliendal | 1 |
| 7. | (Netherlands) Aurelio Oehlers | 1 |
| 7. | (Netherlands) Dion Versluis | 1 |
| Own goals opponent | | 1 |
| Totals | | 33 |

=== Assists ===
(Netherlands) Keuken Kampioen Divisie

| No. | Name | Goal |
|---|---|---|
| 1. | (Netherlands) Eliano Reijnders | 5 |
| 2. | (Netherlands) Mees Rijks | 3 |
| 3. | (Netherlands) Lynden Edhart | 2 |
| 3. | (Netherlands) Yuya Ikeshita | 2 |
| 3. | (Netherlands) Derensili Sanches Fernandes | 2 |
| 3. | (Estonia) Rocco Robert Shein | 2 |
| 7. | (Netherlands) Julliani Eersteling | 1 |
| 7. | (Netherlands) Kevin Gadellaa | 1 |
| 7. | (Netherlands) Yannick Leliendal | 1 |
| 7. | (Netherlands) Christopher Mamengi | 1 |
| 7. | (Netherlands) Rick Meissen | 1 |
| 7. | (Netherlands) Aurelio Oehlers | 1 |
| 7. | (Australia) Joshua Rawlins | 1 |
| Totals | | 23 |

== Attendance Stadion Galgenwaard ==
| Round | Opponent | Attendance | Total attendance | Average |
Keuken Kampioen Divisie
| 2 | Heracles Almelo | 1,138 | 1,138 | 1,138 |
| 4 | Willem II | 1,016 | 2,154 | 1,077 |
| 8 | ADO Den Haag | 513 | 2,667 | 889 |
| 12 | PEC Zwolle | 741 | 3,408 | 852 |
| 25 | NAC Breda | 611 | 4,019 | 804 |
| 36 | FC Den Bosch | 532 | 4,551 | 759 |

== Attendance Sportcomplex Zoudenbalch ==
| Round | Opponent | Attendance | Total attendance | Average |
Friendlies
| N/A | (Germany) Borussia Mönchengladbach II | 400 | 400 | 400 |
| N/A | (Belgium) KMSK Deinze | Unknown | 400 | 400 |
| N/A | (Netherlands) SV TEC | Unknown | 400 | 400 |
| N/A | (Netherlands) Jong Sparta Rotterdam | Unknown | 400 | 400 |
| N/A | (Netherlands) Excelsior Rotterdam | Unknown | 400 | 400 |
Keuken Kampioen Divisie
| 6 | Helmond Sport | 301 | 301 | 301 |
| 10 | Almere City FC | 341 | 642 | 321 |
| 14 | FC Eindhoven | 281 | 923 | 308 |
| 15 | MVV Maastricht | 556 | 1,479 | 370 |
| 18 | Jong AZ | 271 | 1,750 | 350 |
| 20 | FC Dordrecht | 222 | 1,972 | 329 |
| 22 | De Graafschap | 530 | 2,502 | 357 |
| 24 | Telstar | 362 | 2,864 | 358 |
| 27 | Roda JC Kerkrade | 233 | 3,097 | 344 |
| 30 | Jong PSV | 351 | 3,448 | 345 |
| 32 | TOP Oss | 303 | 3,751 | 341 |
| 34 | Jong Ajax | 345 | 4,096 | 341 |
| 38 | VVV-Venlo | 525 | 4,621 | 355 |
