= 2021–22 FC Utrecht season =

FC Utrecht
2021–22 season
- Owner: Frans van Seumeren Holding B.V. (99%); Stichting Beheer Aandelen FC Utrecht (1%)
- Chairman: Pieter Leyssius
- Head coach: René Hake (until 22 March 2022); Rick Kruys (interim) (from 22 March 2022)
- Stadium: Stadion Galgenwaard
- Eredivisie: 7th
- KNVB Cup: Second round
- Play-offs: Semi-finals
- Top goalscorer: League: Anastasios Douvikas; Bart Ramselaar (both 9); All: Anastasios Douvikas (10)
- Highest home attendance: 22,269 (vs. PSV, 13 March 2022)
- Lowest home attendance: 0 (vs. Heracles Almelo, 28 November 2021) (vs. Go Ahead Eagles, 11 December 2021) (vs. FC Twente, 22 December 2021) (vs. Ajax, 16 January 2022)
- Average home league attendance: 18,404
- Biggest win: 0–5 (vs. SteDoCo, 26 October 2021)
- Biggest defeat: 5–1 (vs. AZ, 17 October 2021)
Home colours	Away colours	Third colours

The 2021–22 season was the 52nd season in the existence of FC Utrecht and the club's 52nd consecutive season in the top flight of Dutch football. In addition to the domestic league, FC Utrecht participated in this season's editions of the KNVB Cup. In the regular season, they qualified for the play-offs, for a place in the second round of the UEFA Europa Conference League.

== Players ==
=== First-team squad ===
As of 25 March 2022

Note: Flags indicate national team as defined under FIFA eligibility rules; some limited exceptions apply. Players may hold more than one non-FIFA nationality.

No.	Pos.	Nation	Player
~~1~~	GK	NED	~~Maarten Paes~~ (Note: Sold, loaned out or contract terminated during the season.)
2	DF	NED	Mark van der Maarel (vice-captain)
3	DF	NED	Tommy St. Jago
5	DF	NED	Hidde ter Avest
6	MF	NED	Adam Maher
~~7~~	FW	NED	~~Gyrano Kerk~~
7	FW	JPN	Naoki Maeda (on loan from Nagoya Grampus)
8	MF	NED	Joris van Overeem
~~9~~	FW	ESP	~~Adrián Dalmau~~
9	FW	GRE	Anastasios Douvikas
10	MF	SWE	Simon Gustafson
11	FW	MAR	Mimoun Mahi
14	DF	NED	Willem Janssen (captain)
16	GK	NED	Fabian de Keijzer
~~17~~	DF	MAR	~~Benaissa Benamar~~
17	FW	SWE	Pontus Almqvist
18	FW	NED	Henk Veerman
~~19~~	MF	NED	~~Davy van den Berg~~
20	DF	FRA	Arthur Zagre (on loan from AS Monaco)
21	DF	NED	Django Warmerdam
22	MF	NED	Sander van de Streek
23	MF	NED	Bart Ramselaar

No.	Pos.	Nation	Player
24	DF	NED	Christopher Mamengi
25	DF	NED	Sylian Mokono
26	MF	BEL	Othmane Boussaid
27	MF	NED	Quinten Timber
28	MF	NED	Urby Emanuelson
29	FW	FRA	Moussa Sylla
30	FW	NED	Remco Balk
31	GK	NED	Joey Houweling
31	GK	NED	Thijmen Nijhuis
32	GK	GER	Eric Oelschlägel
33	DF	NED	Mike van der Hoorn (on loan from Arminia Bielefeld)
35	DF	NED	Djevencio van der Kust
37	FW	NED	Mohamed Mallahi
38	MF	EST	Rocco Robert Shein
39	FW	NED	Mees Rijks
44	DF	NED	Ruben Kluivert
45	MF	NED	Raymond Huizing
46	DF	NED	Rick Meissen
47	FW	NED	Eros Maddy
61	GK	NED	Kevin Gadellaa
61	GK	NED	Sep van der Heijden

== Transfers ==
=== Summer ===
==== Transfers in ====
Nat.	Pos.	Player	Transferred from	Particularities
(Greece) GRE	FW	Anastasios Douvikas	(Greece) Volos NFC	
(Netherlands) NED	MF	Quinten Timber	(Netherlands) Jong Ajax	Transfer free
(Netherlands) NED	DF	Mike van der Hoorn	(Germany) Arminia Bielefeld	On loan (+purchase obligation)
(France) FRA	DF	Arthur Zagre	(Monaco) AS Monaco	On loan (+option to buy)
(Germany) GER	FW	Jonas Arweiler	(Netherlands) ADO Den Haag	Back from loan
(Czech Republic) CZE	FW	Václav Černý	(Netherlands) FC Twente	Back from loan
(The Gambia) GAM	DF	Leon Guwara	(Netherlands) VVV-Venlo	Back from loan
(Netherlands) NED	MF	Mitchell van Rooijen	(Netherlands) Excelsior	Back from loan
(Netherlands) NED	FW	Nick Venema	(Netherlands) NAC Breda	Back from loan
(Netherlands) NED	MF	Justin Lonwijk	(Denmark) Viborg FF	Back from loan (+option to buy)

==== Transfers out ====
Nat.	Pos.	Player	Transferred to	Particularities
(Netherlands) NED	FW	Gyrano Kerk	(Russia) Lokomotiv Moscow	
(Germany) GER	FW	Jonas Arweiler	(Netherlands) Almere City FC	
(Czech Republic) CZE	FW	Václav Černý	(Netherlands) FC Twente	
(Netherlands) NED	MF	Mitchell van Rooijen	(Netherlands) VVV-Venlo	
(Netherlands) NED	MF	Odysseus Velanas	(Netherlands) NAC Breda	
(Netherlands) NED	FW	Nick Venema	(Netherlands) Jong FC Utrecht	
(Netherlands) NED	FW	Eljero Elia	(Netherlands) ADO Den Haag	Contract terminated
(The Gambia) GAM	DF	Leon Guwara	(Germany) SSV Jahn Regensburg	Transfer free
(Netherlands) NED	MF	Justin Lonwijk	(Denmark) Viborg FF	Buy option lifted
(Sweden) SWE	DF	Emil Bergström	(Netherlands) Willem II	On loan
(Netherlands) NED	GK	Thijmen Nijhuis	(Netherlands) MVV Maastricht	On loan
(Netherlands) NED	DF	Justin Hoogma	(Germany) TSG 1899 Hoffenheim	Back from loan
(Netherlands) NED	DF	Giovanni Troupée	(Netherlands) FC Twente	End of contract

=== Winter ===
==== Transfers in ====
Nat.	Pos.	Player	Transferred from	Particularities
(Netherlands) NED	FW	Henk Veerman	(Netherlands) sc Heerenveen	
(Japan) JPN	FW	Naoki Maeda	(Japan) Nagoya Grampus	On loan (+option to buy, if lifted contract till 2025)
(Netherlands) NED	GK	Thijmen Nijhuis	(Netherlands) MVV Maastricht	Terminated the loan early

==== Transfers out ====
Nat.	Pos.	Player	Transferred to	Particularities
(Spain) ESP	FW	Adrián Dalmau	(Netherlands) Sparta Rotterdam	
(Netherlands) NED	GK	Thijmen Nijhuis	(Netherlands) Jong FC Utrecht	
(Netherlands) NED	MF	Davy van den Berg	(Netherlands) Roda JC Kerkrade	On loan
(Morocco) MAR	DF	Benaissa Benamar	(Netherlands) FC Volendam	On loan (when promotion final transfer)
(Netherlands) NED	GK	Maarten Paes	(United States) FC Dallas	On loan (+option to buy)

=== Outside transfer window ===
==== Transfers in ====
Nat.	Pos.	Player	Transferred from	Particularities
(Sweden) SWE	FW	Pontus Almqvist	(Russia) FK Rostov	Transfer due to special Russia/Ukraine rule

== Pre-season and friendlies ==
Win Draw Loss Fixtures

30 June 2021 Friendly	FC Utrecht (Netherlands)	7–2	(Belgium) KV Mechelen	Utrecht, Netherlands
17:00 CEST (UTC+2)	Sylla 2'; Ramselaar 19'; Dalmau 28', 44'; Balk 57'; Kerk 65'; Cuypers 71' (o.g.)	Report	Hairemans 32'; Cuypers 75'	Stadium: Sportcomplex Zoudenbalch; Attendance: 0
Note: Behind closed doors.

3 July 2021 Friendly	Royal Antwerp FC (Belgium)	2–2	(Netherlands) FC Utrecht	Antwerp, Belgium
14:00 CEST (UTC+2)	De Laet 48'; Mbenza 65' (pen.)	Report	Gustafson (yellow card); Van der Maarel (yellow card); Dalmau (yellow card); Kerk 80'; Boussaid 107'	Attendance: 0
Note: Behind closed doors and the match was played in two periods of 60 minutes each.

9 July 2021 Friendly	KAA Gent (Belgium)	0–3	(Netherlands) FC Utrecht	Scharendijke, Netherlands
14:30 CEST (UTC+2)	Nurio (yellow card)	Report	Douvikas 38'; Van de Streek 61'; Ramselaar 73'	Attendance: 0
Note: Behind closed doors.

10 July 2021 Friendly	RSC Anderlecht (Belgium)	1–1	(Netherlands) FC Utrecht	Alkmaar, Netherlands
14:00 CEST (UTC+2)	Stassin 81'	Report	Dalmau 45'	Stadium: Overdie Sportpark - Alkmaarsche Boys; Attendance: 0
Note: Behind closed doors.

13 July 2021 Friendly	Club Brugge (Belgium)	2–4	(Netherlands) FC Utrecht	Knokke-Heist, Belgium
18:00 CEST (UTC+2)	Rits 51'; Audoor 79'	Report	Balk 32'; Van der Kust 65'; Douvikas 76' (pen.); Gustafson 83'	Stadium: Belfius Basecamp; Attendance: 0 Referee: Christophe Windels
Note: Behind closed doors.

14 July 2021 Friendly	Beerschot (Belgium)	1–2	(Netherlands) FC Utrecht	Antwerp, Belgium
18:00 CEST (UTC+2)	Holzhauser (yellow card); Eleke 81'	Report	Mallahi (yellow card); Maher (yellow card); Boussaid 33'; Van de Streek 76'	Stadium: Olympisch Stadion; Attendance: 2,500

17 July 2021 Friendly	SV Zulte Waregem (Belgium)	0–0	(Netherlands) FC Utrecht	Waregem, Belgium
14:30 CEST (UTC+2)		Report	Warmerdam (yellow card)	Stadium: Elindus Arena; Attendance: 3,000

24 July 2021 Friendly	FC Utrecht (Netherlands)	6–2	(Greece) Volos NFC	Utrecht, Netherlands
18:00 CEST (UTC+2)	Douvikas 29', 33'; Timber 35'; Balk 68', 86'; Van de Streek 90' (pen.)	Report	Van Weert 37'; Ninis 56'	Stadium: Sportcomplex Zoudenbalch; Attendance: 200

28 July 2021 Friendly	Bayer 04 Leverkusen (Germany)	1–5	(Netherlands) FC Utrecht	Leverkusen, Germany
16:00 CEST (UTC+2)	Aourir (yellow card); Bakker 50'	Report	Kerk 55', 71'; Balk 102'; Dalmau 128' (pen.), 133' (pen.)	Stadium: Ulrich-Haberland-Stadion; Attendance: 375; Referee: Niklas Dardenne
Note: The match was played in three periods of 45 minutes each.

31 July 2021 Friendly	VfL Bochum (Germany)	0–2	(Netherlands) FC Utrecht	Bochum, Germany
15:30 CEST (UTC+2)	Soares (yellow card)	Report	Boussaid (yellow card); Ramselaar 44', 69'	Stadium: Vonovia Ruhrstadion; Attendance: 4,000; Referee: Niklas Dardenne

31 July 2021 Friendly	FC Utrecht (Netherlands)	2–3	(Italy) Venezia FC	Utrecht, Netherlands
20:00 CEST (UTC+2)	Van den Berg (yellow card); Benamar (yellow card); Van der Kust (yellow card); Gustafson 7' (pen.), 75' (pen.)	Report	Aramu (yellow card) , (goal) 12'; Forte 20'; Di Mariano 85' (pen.)	Stadium: Stadion Galgenwaard; Attendance: 0 Referee: Thomas Hardeman
Note: Behind closed doors.

7 August 2021 Friendly	FC Utrecht (Netherlands)	2–3	(Netherlands) Fortuna Sittard	Utrecht, Netherlands
13:00 CEST (UTC+2)	Douvikas 15'; Ramselaar 55'	Report	Janssen (yellow card); Douvikas 3' (o.g.); Sambou 44'; Seuntjens 62' (pen.)	Stadium: Sportcomplex Zoudenbalch; Attendance: 200

7 August 2021 Friendly	FC Utrecht (Netherlands)	7–0	(Netherlands) Fortuna Sittard	Utrecht, Netherlands
15:00 CEST (UTC+2)	Balk 20', 26'; Dalmau 32', 44' (pen.), 51'; Sylla 53', 58'	Report		Stadium: Sportcomplex Zoudenbalch; Attendance: 200

2 September 2021 Friendly	FC Utrecht (Netherlands)	3–1	(Belgium) Cercle Brugge	Utrecht, Netherlands
14:00 CEST (UTC+2)	Van den Berg (yellow card); Van der Hoorn 42'; Benamar 63'; Mallahi 69'	Report	Somers 81'	Stadium: Stadion Galgenwaard; Attendance: 501

7 October 2021 Friendly	FC Utrecht (Netherlands)	3–2	(Netherlands) Sparta Rotterdam	Utrecht, Netherlands
14:00 CEST (UTC+2)	Mahi 27'; Dalmau 52'; Benamar 83'	Report	Engels 7' (pen.); Abels 50'	Stadium: Stadion Galgenwaard; Attendance: 251; Referee: Alex Bos

10 November 2021 Friendly	Willen II (Netherlands)	2–1	(Netherlands) FC Utrecht	Tilburg, Netherlands
	Kampetsis 12'; Yeboah 39'	Report	Balk 14'	Attendance: 0 Referee: Luuk Timmer
Note: Behind closed doors.

26 January 2022 Friendly	Ajax (Netherlands)	0–1	(Netherlands) FC Utrecht	Amsterdam, Netherlands
14:00 CET (UTC+1)		Report	Sylla 39'	Stadium: Sportcomplex de Toekomst; Attendance: 0 Referee: Ingmar Oostrom
Note: Behind closed doors.

27 January 2022 Friendly	Go Ahead Eagles (Netherlands)	1–1	(Netherlands) FC Utrecht	Wenum-Wiesel, Netherlands
14:00 CET (UTC+1)	Deijl (yellow card); Lidberg 31'	Report	Douvikas 47'	Stadium: Sportpark Wiesel; Attendance: 0
Note: Behind closed doors.

24 March 2022 Friendly	Schalke 04 (Germany)	1–0	(Netherlands) FC Utrecht	Gelsenkirchen, Germany
	Drexler 12'	Report	Janssen (yellow card)	Attendance: 0 Referee: Waldemar Stor
Note: Behind closed doors.

12 April 2022 Friendly	FC Utrecht (Netherlands)	3–1	(Netherlands) ADO Den Haag	Utrecht, Netherlands
14:00 CEST (UTC+2)	Warmerdam (yellow card); Mahi 49'; Almqvist 53'; Ter Avest 59'	Report	Owusu (yellow card); Bourard 72'	Stadium: Sportcomplex Zoudenbalch; Attendance: 0 Referee: Alex Bos
Note: Behind closed doors.

14 April 2022 Friendly	Go Ahead Eagles (Netherlands)	0–3	(Netherlands) FC Utrecht	Deventer, Netherlands
14:00 CEST (UTC+2)		Report	Timber 9'; Boussaid 14'; Ramselaar 63'	Stadium: De Adelaarshorst; Attendance: 0
Note: Behind closed doors.

== Competitions ==
=== Overall record ===
Competition	First match	Last match	Starting round	Final position	Record							
Competition	First match	Last match	Starting round	Final position	Pld	W	D	L	GF	GA	GD	Win %
Eredivisie	15 August 2021	15 May 2022	Matchday 1	7th	34	12	11	11	51	46	+5	35.29
KNVB Cup	26 October 2021	14 December 2021	First round	Second round	2	1	0	1	7	3	+4	50.00
Play-offs	19 May 2022	22 May 2022	Semi-finals	Semi-finals	2	1	0	1	3	4	−1	50.00
Total					38	14	11	13	61	53	+8	36.84

Last updated: 23 May 2022
Source: Soccerway

=== Eredivisie ===
==== League table ====
Pos	Team	Pld	W	D	L	GF	GA	GD	Pts	Qualification or relegation
5	AZ (O)	34	18	7	9	64	44	+20	61	Qualification for the European competition play-offs
6	Vitesse	34	15	6	13	42	51	−9	51	Qualification for the European competition play-offs
7	Utrecht	34	12	11	11	51	46	+5	47	Qualification for the European competition play-offs
8	Heerenveen	34	11	8	15	37	50	−13	41	Qualification for the European competition play-offs
9	Cambuur	34	11	6	17	53	70	−17	39	

Source: Eredivisie
Rules for classification: Season in progress: 1) Most points won; 2) Less points lost; 3) Goal difference; 4) Goals scored; 5) Alphabetical order; End of season: 1) Points; 2) Goal difference; 3) Goals scored; 4) Head-to-head points; 5) Head-to-head goal difference; 6) Head-to-head away goals scored; 7) Play-off if relevant for deciding champion, relegation or participating in a European league, otherwise by draw. 8) Penalty shoot-out (only after a play-off)
(O) Play-off winners

==== Results summary ====
Overall								Home						Away					
Pld	W	D	L	GF	GA	GD	Pts	W	D	L	GF	GA	GD	W	D	L	GF	GA	GD
34	12	11	11	51	46	+5	47	8	6	3	32	20	+12	4	5	8	19	26	−7

Last updated: 16 May 2022.
Source: Eredivisie

==== Results by round ====
Round	1	2	3	4	5	6	7	8	9	10	11	12	13	14	15	16	17	18	19	20	21	22	23	24	25	26	27	28	29	30	31	32	33	34
Ground	H	A	H	A	H	A	H	A	A	H	H	A	A	H	A	H	A	H	H	A	H	A	H	A	A	H	H	A	H	A	H	A	H	A
Result	W	D	W	L	D	W	W	W	L	W	W	L	L	W	L	D	D	D	L	W	W	L	D	W	D	L	L	D	D	L	W	D	D	L
Position	2	5	3	4	6	5	5	4	4	4	4	4	4	4	4	6	7	7	7	7	7	7	7	7	7	7	7	7	7	7	7	7	7	7

Updated to match(es) played on 16 May 2022. Source: Eredivisie
A = Away; H = Home; W = Win; D = Draw; L = Loss

==== Matches ====
The league fixtures were announced on 11 June 2021.

15 August 2021 1	FC Utrecht	4–0	Sparta Rotterdam	Utrecht
14:30 CEST (UTC+2)	Maher 2'; Van der Maarel (yellow card) 51' (goal) 65'; Douvikas 75'; Gustafson 90+3' (pen.)	Report	Harroui (yellow card) 55'; van Crooij (yellow card) 59'; Vriends (yellow card) 90+2'	Stadium: Stadion Galgenwaard; Attendance: 16,000; Referee: Martin van den Kerkhof

21 August 2021 2	FC Groningen	0–0	FC Utrecht	Groningen
21:00 CEST (UTC+2)	Kasanwirjo (yellow card) 57'; Matusiwa (yellow card) 74'; Suslov (yellow card) 75'	Report	Timber (yellow card) 45'; Ter Avest (yellow card) 57'; Kerk (yellow card) 75'; Janssen (yellow card) 88'	Stadium: Euroborg; Attendance: 14,800; Referee: Danny Makkelie

29 August 2021 3	FC Utrecht	3–1	Feyenoord	Utrecht
12:15 CEST (UTC+2)	Janssen 45+3'; Sylla 48'; Gustafson 51' (pen.); Maher (yellow card) 75'	Report	Malacia (yellow card) 42'; Sinisterra 45'; Til (yellow card) 45+3'; Toornstra (yellow card) 53'; Hendriks (yellow card) 58'	Stadium: Stadion Galgenwaard; Attendance: 16,000; Referee: Dennis Higler

11 September 2021 4	FC Twente	1–0	FC Utrecht	Enschede
16:30 CEST (UTC+2)	Hilgers (yellow card) 12'; Sadílek (yellow card) 81'; Limnios (yellow card) 89'; Ugalde (yellow card) 89'; Pröpper 90+1'	Report	Janssen (yellow card) 51'; Warmerdam (yellow card) 74'; Sylla (yellow card) 82'; Maher (yellow card) 89'	Stadium: De Grolsch Veste; Attendance: 20,000; Referee: Serdar Gözübüyük

18 September 2021 5	FC Utrecht	2–2	RKC Waalwijk	Utrecht
21:00 CEST (UTC+2)	Gustafson 4'; Janssen (yellow card) 27'; Douvikas 52' (pen.)	Report	Odgaard (penalty missed) 8', 20'; Büttner 45'; Kramer (yellow card) 69'; Vaessen (yellow card) 90+4'; Daneels (yellow card) 90+6'	Stadium: Stadion Galgenwaard; Attendance: 16,000; Referee: Richard Martens

22 September 2021 6	N.E.C. Nijmegen	0–3	FC Utrecht	Nijmegen
18:45 CEST (UTC+2)		Report	Ramselaar 7', 79'; Van der Maarel (yellow card) 66'; Douvikas 67'	Stadium: Goffertstadion; Attendance: 8,333; Referee: Marc Nagtegaal

25 September 2021 7	FC Utrecht	5–1	PEC Zwolle	Utrecht
21:00 CEST (UTC+2)	Douvikas 11' (pen.); Sylla 59'; Ramselaar 65' (pen.); Mahi 66'; Janssen 86'	Report	Strieder (yellow card) 64'; Saymak 75'	Stadium: Stadion Galgenwaard; Attendance: 19,451; Referee: Allard Lindhout

3 October 2021 8	Ajax	0–1	FC Utrecht	Amsterdam
14:30 CEST (UTC+2)	Gravenberch (yellow card) 50'	Report	Van der Maarel (yellow card) 38'; Paes (yellow card) 63'; Maher (yellow card) 67'; Warmerdam 77'; Timber (yellow card) 79'	Stadium: Johan Cruijff ArenA; Attendance: 52,621; Referee: Bas Nijhuis

17 October 2021 9	AZ Alkmaar	5–1	FC Utrecht	Alkmaar
12:15 CEST (UTC+2)	Pavlidis 6'; Karlsson 12'; De Wit 39', 56'; Gudmundsson 86' (pen.)	Report	Timber 90'	Stadium: AFAS Stadion; Attendance: 17,037; Referee: Kevin Blom

23 October 2021 10	FC Utrecht	2–1	sc Heerenveen	Utrecht
18:45 CEST (UTC+2)	Sylla 21'; Van der Maarel (yellow card) 48'; Van de Streek 80'	Report	Janssen 23' (o.g.); Kongolo (yellow card) 34'	Stadium: Stadion Galgenwaard; Attendance: 21,875; Referee: Jochem Kamphuis

31 October 2021 11	FC Utrecht	5–1	Willem II	Utrecht
16:45 CET (UTC+1)	Ramselaar 10', 25', 67'; Maher (yellow card) 38'; Van der Maarel (yellow card) 79'; Mallahi 83'; Van Overeem 90+2'	Report	Owusu (yellow card) 6'; Wriedt 35'; Saddiki (yellow card) 72'; Svensson (yellow card) 78'	Stadium: Stadion Galgenwaard; Attendance: 20,469; Referee: Pol van Boekel

7 November 2021 12	Vitesse	2–1	FC Utrecht	Arnhem
16:45 CET (UTC+1)	Frederiksen 7'; Bazoer 45+2'	Report	Janssen (yellow card) 64'; Zagre 77'; Maher (yellow card) 90+1'; Mallahi (yellow card) 90+9'	Stadium: GelreDome; Attendance: 15,867; Referee: Jochem Kamphuis

21 November 2021 13	SC Cambuur	2–1	FC Utrecht	Leeuwarden
20:00 CET (UTC+1)	Uldrikis 21'; Jacobs 54'	Report	Sylla 32'; Warmerdam (yellow card) 47'; Van der Maarel (yellow card) 90+3'	Stadium: Cambuur Stadion; Attendance: 0 Referee: Dennis Higler

28 November 2021 14	FC Utrecht	1–0	Heracles Almelo	Utrecht
14:30 CET (UTC+1)	Gustafson (penalty missed) 40'; Paes (yellow card) 80'; Knoester 90+3' (o.g.)	Report	Rente (yellow card) 83'	Stadium: Stadion Galgenwaard; Attendance: 0 Referee: Martin van den Kerkhof

4 December 2021 15	PSV	4–1	FC Utrecht	Eindhoven
16:30 CET (UTC+1)	Gakpo 27'; Ramalho 35'; Doan 51'; Mwene 70'	Report	Van der Hoorn 12'; Ter Avest (yellow card) 32'	Stadium: Philips Stadion; Attendance: 0 Referee: Danny Makkelie

11 December 2021 16	FC Utrecht	0–0	Go Ahead Eagles	Utrecht
18:45 CET (UTC+1)	Maher (yellow card) 90+3'	Report	Deijl (yellow card) 90+2'	Stadium: Stadion Galgenwaard; Attendance: 0 Referee: Joey Kooij

18 December 2021 17	Fortuna Sittard	2–2	FC Utrecht	Sittard
16:30 CET (UTC+1)	Cox 23' (yellow card) 33'; Flemming 77'	Report	Mahi 21'; Van de Streek (yellow card) 45' (goal) 50'; Maher (yellow card) 70'; Janssen (yellow card) 84'	Stadium: Fortuna Sittard Stadion; Attendance: 0 Referee: Martin Pérez

22 December 2021 18	FC Utrecht	1–1	FC Twente	Utrecht
21:00 CET (UTC+1)	Van der Maarel (yellow card) 77'; Douvikas (yellow card) 82'; Mahi 90+5'; Timber (yellow card) 90+8'	Report	Van Wolfswinkel 17'; Oosterwolde (yellow card) 42'; Sadílek (red card) 51'; Zerrouki (yellow card) 90+7'	Stadium: Stadion Galgenwaard; Attendance: 0 Referee: Richard Martens

16 January 2022 19	FC Utrecht	0–3	Ajax	Utrecht
12:15 CET (UTC+1)	Maher (yellow card) 20'; Boussaid (yellow card) 45+2'	Report	Antony 5'; Brobbey 19', 45+2'; Mazraoui (yellow card) 65'	Stadium: Stadion Galgenwaard; Attendance: 0 Referee: Serdar Gözübüyük

23 January 2022 20	Sparta Rotterdam	0–3	FC Utrecht	Rotterdam
16:45 CET (UTC+1)	Dalmau (yellow card) 28'	Report	Douvikas 12'; Timber (yellow card) 41'; Mahi 47'; Coremans 75' (o.g.)	Stadium: Het Kasteel; Attendance: 0 Referee: Erwin Blank

5 February 2022 21	FC Utrecht	3–2	SC Cambuur	Utrecht
16:30 CET (UTC+1)	Douvikas 33', 38'; Janssen (yellow card) 43'; Van der Maarel (yellow card) 60'; Veerman 64'	Report	Schouten 8', 12'; Maulun (yellow card) 21'; Uldrikis (yellow card) 43'	Stadium: Stadion Galgenwaard; Attendance: 8,000; Referee: Edwin van de Graaf

11 February 2022 22	Heracles Almelo	1–0	FC Utrecht	Almelo
20:00 CET (UTC+1)	Quagliata (yellow card) 71'; Basaçikoglu (yellow card) 72'; Sierhuis 82'	Report	Van der Maarel (yellow card) 52'	Stadium: Erve Asito; Attendance: 4,058; Referee: Rob Dieperink

20 February 2022 23	FC Utrecht	1–1	Vitesse	Utrecht
16:45 CET (UTC+1)	Sylla 14' (yellow card) 62'; Van de Streek (yellow card) 42'; Maher (yellow card) 72'	Report	Tronstad (yellow card) 59'; Wittek (yellow card) 64'; Grbic (red card) 65'; Doekhi 90+2'	Stadium: Stadion Galgenwaard; Attendance: 16,886; Referee: Allard Lindhout

27 February 2022 24	sc Heerenveen	1–2	FC Utrecht	Heerenveen
20:00 CET (UTC+1)	Van Hooijdonk 80' (pen.)	Report	Ramselaar 58'; Van der Hoorn 69' (yellow card) 78'; Van de Streek (yellow card) 90+1'	Stadium: Abe Lenstra Stadion; Attendance: 19,200; Referee: Serdar Gözübüyük

5 March 2022 25	Go Ahead Eagles	1–1	FC Utrecht	Deventer
18:45 CET (UTC+1)	Brouwers 33'; Rommens (yellow card) 59'	Report	Van der Maarel (yellow card) 39'; Sylla 76'	Stadium: De Adelaarshorst; Attendance: 9,924; Referee: Danny Makkelie

13 March 2022 26	FC Utrecht	0–1	PSV	Utrecht
14:30 CET (UTC+1)	Warmerdam (yellow card) 19'; Maher (yellow card) 88'	Report	Zahavi 53'; Teze (yellow card) 86'; Mauro Júnior (yellow card) 90+2'; Carlos Vinícius (yellow card) 90+2'	Stadium: Stadion Galgenwaard; Attendance: 22,269; Referee: Bas Nijhuis

20 March 2022 27	FC Utrecht	1–3	FC Groningen	Utrecht
12:15 CET (UTC+1)	Ramselaar 48'; Van Overeem (yellow card) 63'	Report	El Hankouri 4' (pen.); De Leeuw 10'; Meijer (yellow card) 41'; Te Wierik (yellow card) 41'; Dankerlui (yellow card) 48'; Strand Larsen 89'	Stadium: Stadion Galgenwaard; Attendance: 21,221; Referee: Dennis Higler

2 April 2022 28	RKC Waalwijk	1–1	FC Utrecht	Waalwijk
20:00 CEST (UTC+2)	Kramer 90+2'	Report	Timber 34'	Stadium: Mandemakers Stadion; Attendance: 6,389; Referee: Marc Nagtegaal

9 April 2022 29	FC Utrecht	1–1	Fortuna Sittard	Utrecht
18:45 CEST (UTC+2)	Ramselaar 5'	Report	Duarte (yellow card) 30'; Flemming 61'; Gladon (yellow card) 90+6'	Stadium: Stadion Galgenwaard; Attendance: 21,216; Referee: Sander van der Eijk

24 April 2022 30	Feyenoord	2–1	FC Utrecht	Rotterdam
14:30 CEST (UTC+2)	Van der Hoorn 48' (o.g.); Sinisterra 90+6' (yellow card) 90+7'	Report	Ter Avest (yellow card) 58'; Van de Streek 64'; De Keijzer (yellow card) 81'	Stadium: De Kuip; Attendance: 47,500; Referee: Bas Nijhuis

29 April 2022 31	FC Utrecht	1–0	N.E.C. Nijmegen	Utrecht
20:00 CEST (UTC+2)	Douvikas 77'	Report	Duelund (yellow card) 14'; Bruijn (yellow card) 50'; Proper (yellow card) 73'	Stadium: Stadion Galgenwaard; Attendance: 20,665; Referee: Danny Makkelie

7 May 2022 32	PEC Zwolle	1–1	FC Utrecht	Zwolle
20:00 CEST (UTC+2)	Redan 73'	Report	Ter Avest 29'	Stadium: MAC³PARK Stadion; Attendance: 14,000; Referee: Pol van Boekel

11 May 2022 33	FC Utrecht	2–2	AZ	Utrecht
20:00 CEST (UTC+2)	Van de Streek 37'; Van Overeem (yellow card) 57'; Douvikas 90+4'	Report	Pavlidis 12', 15'; De Wit (yellow card) 69'	Stadium: Stadion Galgenwaard; Attendance: 20,085; Referee: Jochem Kamphuis

15 May 2022 34	Willem II	3–0	FC Utrecht	Tilburg
14:30 CEST (UTC+2)	Hornkamp 8'; Llonch (yellow card) 49'; Saddiki 53'; Van Overeem 73' (o.g.)	Report	Gustafson (yellow card) 56'	Stadium: Koning Willem II Stadion; Attendance: 14,000; Referee: Martin van den Kerkhof

=== KNVB Cup ===
26 October 2021 First round	SteDoCo	0–5	FC Utrecht	Hoornaar
18:45 CEST (UTC+2)		Report	Balk 17'; Boussaid 40'; Maher 54'; Sylla 79'; Van de Streek 90+2'	Stadium: Sportpark SteDoCo; Attendance: 1,980; Referee: Sander van der Eijk

14 December 2021 Second round	NAC Breda	3–2	FC Utrecht	Breda
21:00 CET (UTC+1)	Haye 55', 70'; Seuntjens (yellow card) 89'; Kotzebue 90+2'	Report	Dalmau (penalty missed) 28'; Van der Hoorn 34', (yellow card) 54' (yellow-red card) 81'; Douvikas 86'	Stadium: Rat Verlegh Stadion; Attendance: 0 Referee: Allard Lindhout

=== Play-offs ===
Semi-finals

19 May 2022 First leg	FC Utrecht	3–1	Vitesse	Utrecht
21:00 CEST (UTC+2)	Janssen 3'; Van de Streek 21', (yellow card) 53'; Van der Kust (yellow card) 51'; Gustafson 81' (pen.)	Report	Buitink (yellow card) 51'; Tronstad (yellow card) 60'; Doekhi (yellow card) 74'; Vroegh 85'; Openda (yellow card) 90+3'	Stadium: Stadion Galgenwaard; Attendance: 17,524; Referee: Dennis Higler

22 May 2022 Second leg	Vitesse	3–0 (a.e.t.) (4–3 agg.)	FC Utrecht	Arnhem
18:00 CEST (UTC+2)	Manhoef 39'; Domgjoni (yellow card) 44'; Tronstad 52'; Baden Frederiksen 93', (yellow card) 120+1' (yellow-red card) 120+3'; Hájek (yellow card) 112'; Houwen (yellow card) 117'	Report	Van der Maarel (yellow card) 105+1'	Stadium: GelreDome; Attendance: 13,675; Referee: Allard Lindhout

== Statistics ==
=== Goalscorers ===
Friendlies

No.	Name	Goal
1.	(Spain) Adrián Dalmau (Note: Sold, loaned out or contract terminated during the season.)	9
2.	(Netherlands) Remco Balk	8
3.	(Greece) Anastasios Douvikas	6
3.	(Netherlands) Bart Ramselaar	6
5.	(Netherlands) Gyrano Kerk	4
5.	(France) Moussa Sylla	4
7.	(Belgium) Othmane Boussaid	3
7.	(Sweden) Simon Gustafson	3
7.	(Netherlands) Sander van de Streek	3
10.	(Morocco) Benaissa Benamar	2
10.	(Morocco) Mimoun Mahi	2
10.	(Netherlands) Quinten Timber	2
13.	(Sweden) Pontus Almqvist	1
13.	(Netherlands) Hidde ter Avest	1
13.	(Netherlands) Mike van der Hoorn	1
13.	(Netherlands) Djevencio van der Kust	1
13.	(Netherlands) Mohamed Mallahi	1
Own goals opponent		1
Totals		58

(Netherlands) Eredivisie

No.	Name	Goal
1.	(Greece) Anastasios Douvikas	9
1.	(Netherlands) Bart Ramselaar	9
3.	(France) Moussa Sylla	6
4.	(Morocco) Mimoun Mahi	4
4.	(Netherlands) Sander van de Streek	4
6.	(Sweden) Simon Gustafson	3
7.	(Netherlands) Mike van der Hoorn	2
7.	(Netherlands) Willem Janssen	2
7.	(Netherlands) Quinten Timber	2
10.	(Netherlands) Hidde ter Avest	1
10.	(Netherlands) Mark van der Maarel	1
10.	(Netherlands) Adam Maher	1
10.	(Netherlands) Mohamed Mallahi	1
10.	(Netherlands) Joris van Overeem	1
10.	(Netherlands) Henk Veerman	1
10.	(Netherlands) Django Warmerdam	1
10.	(France) Arthur Zagre	1
Own goals opponent		2
Totals		51

(Netherlands) KNVB Cup

No.	Name	Goal
1.	(Netherlands) Remco Balk	1
1.	(Belgium) Othmane Boussaid	1
1.	(Greece) Anastasios Douvikas	1
1.	(Netherlands) Mike van der Hoorn	1
1.	(Netherlands) Adam Maher	1
1.	(Netherlands) Sander van de Streek	1
1.	(France) Moussa Sylla	1
Own goals opponent		–
Totals		7

(Netherlands) Play-offs

No.	Name	Goal
1.	(Sweden) Simon Gustafson	1
1.	(Netherlands) Willem Janssen	1
1.	(Netherlands) Sander van de Streek	1
Own goals opponent		–
Totals		3

=== Assists ===
(Netherlands) Eredivisie

No.	Name	
1.	(Belgium) Othmane Boussaid	5
2.	(Morocco) Mimoun Mahi	4
2.	(Netherlands) Quinten Timber	4
4.	(Greece) Anastasios Douvikas	3
4.	(Netherlands) Adam Maher	3
4.	(France) Moussa Sylla	3
7.	(Netherlands) Hidde ter Avest	2
7.	(Sweden) Simon Gustafson	2
7.	(Netherlands) Mike van der Hoorn	2
7.	(Netherlands) Django Warmerdam	2
11.	(Netherlands) Remco Balk	1
11.	(Netherlands) Mark van der Maarel	1
11.	(Netherlands) Sylian Mokono	1
11.	(Netherlands) Joris van Overeem	1
11.	(Netherlands) Sander van de Streek	1
Totals		35

(Netherlands) KNVB Cup

No.	Name	
1.	(Netherlands) Hidde ter Avest	1
1.	(Netherlands) Remco Balk	1
1.	(Netherlands) Adam Maher	1
1.	(Netherlands) Joris van Overeem	1
1.	(Netherlands) Bart Ramselaar	1
Totals		5

(Netherlands) Play-offs

No.	Name	
1.	(Belgium) Othmane Boussaid	1
1.	(Sweden) Simon Gustafson	1
Totals		2

== Monthly awards ==
Month	Type of award	Player	Ref.
August	Team of the Month	(Netherlands) Willem Janssen	1
April	Team of the Month	(Netherlands) Fabian de Keijzer	2

== Attendance ==
=== Home games ===
Round	Opponent	Attendance	Total attendance	Average
Friendlies
N/A	(Belgium) KV Mechelen	0 (Note: Match played at Sportcomplex Zoudenbalch.)	0	0
N/A	(Greece) Volos NFC	200	200	200
N/A	(Italy) Venezia FC	0 (Note: Match played in Stadion Galgenwaard.)	200	200
N/A	(Netherlands) Fortuna Sittard	200	400	200
N/A	(Belgium) Cercle Brugge	501	901	300
N/A	(Netherlands) Sparta Rotterdam	251	1,152	288
N/A	(Netherlands) ADO Den Haag	0	1,152	288
Eredivisie
1	Sparta Rotterdam	16,000	16,000	16,000
3	Feyenoord	16,000	32,000	16,000
5	RKC Waalwijk	16,000	48,000	16,000
7	PEC Zwolle	19,451	67,451	16,863
10	sc Heerenveen	21,875	89,326	17,865
11	Willem II	20,469	109,795	18,299
14	Heracles Almelo	0	109,795	18,299
16	Go Ahead Eagles	0	109,795	18,299
18	FC Twente	0	109,795	18,299
19	Ajax	0	109,795	18,299
21	SC Cambuur	8,000	117,795	16,828
23	Vitesse	16,886	134,681	16.835
26	PSV	22,269	156,950	17,439
27	FC Groningen	21,221	178,181	17,817
29	Fortuna Sittard	21,216	199,387	18,126
31	N.E.C. Nijmegen	20,665	220,052	18,338
33	AZ	20,085	240,137	18,472
KNVB Cup
There have been no home games this season.
Play-offs
Semi-finals	Vitesse	17,524	17,524	17,524

=== Away supporters ===
Round	Opponent	Attendance	Total attendance	Average
Eredivisie
2	FC Groningen	503	503	503
4	FC Twente	437	940	470
6	N.E.C. Nijmegen	335	1,275	425
8	Ajax	830	2,105	526
9	AZ	750	2,855	571
12	Vitesse	775	3,630	605
13	SC Cambuur	0	3,630	605
15	PSV	0	3,630	605
17	Fortuna Sittard	0	3,630	605
20	Sparta Rotterdam	0	3,630	605
22	Heracles Almelo	0	3,630	605
24	sc Heerenveen	260	3,890	556
25	Go Ahead Eagles	400	4,290	536
28	RKC Waalwijk	430	4,720	524
30	Feyenoord	531	5,251	525
32	PEC Zwolle	435	5,686	517
34	Vitesse	600	6,286	524
KNVB Cup
First round	SteDoCo	361	361	361
Second round	NAC Breda	0	361	361
Play-offs
Semi-finals	Vitesse	500	500	500
