= Ted van de Pavert =

Dutch footballer (born 1992)

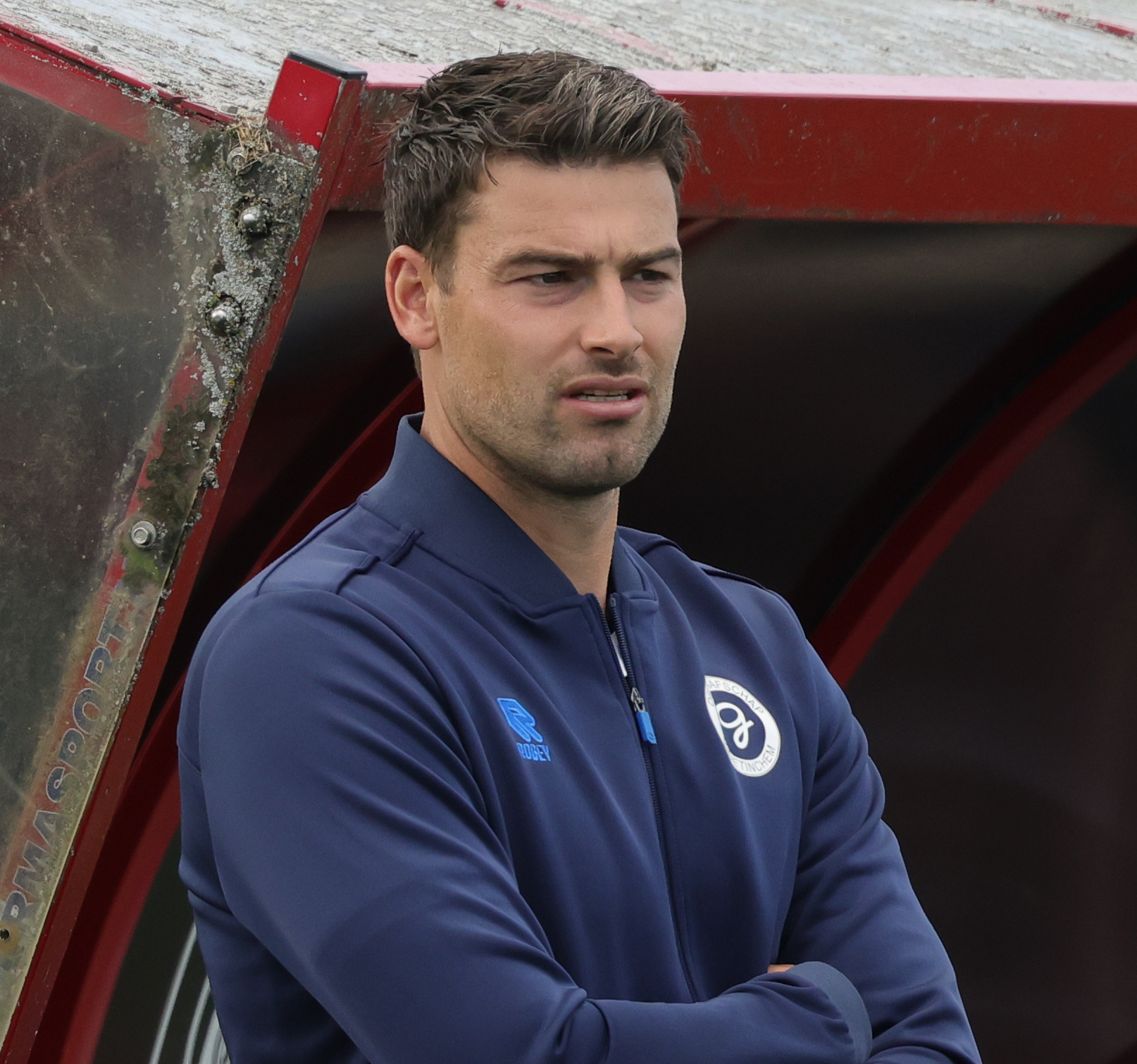
- Van de Pavert in 2025

Personal information
- Date of birth: 6 January 1992 (age 34)
- Place of birth: Doetinchem, Netherlands
- Height: 1.94 m (6 ft 4 in)
- Position: Centre-back

Youth career
- GWVV
- De Graafschap

Senior career*
Years	Team	Apps	(Gls)
2010–2016	De Graafschap	136	(7)
2016–2018	PEC Zwolle	23	(2)
2017–2018	→ NEC (loan)	27	(2)
2018–2022	De Graafschap	111	(5)
2022–2023	Roda JC	23	(1)
Total		320	(35)

International career
2013	Netherlands U20	1	(0)
- * Club domestic league appearances and goals

Ted van de Pavert (born 6 January 1992) is a Dutch former professional footballer who played as a centre-back. He spent the majority of his career at De Graafschap, making 273 appearances and scoring 14 goals across two stints between 2010 and 2022, with briefer spells at PEC Zwolle and NEC in between. He retired in 2023 following a single season with Roda JC, having made 353 appearances and scored 37 goals in professional football. After retiring, he returned to De Graafschap as a youth coach.

During his playing career, Van de Pavert earned one cap for the Netherlands under-20s in 2013.

== Club career ==
=== De Graafschap ===
Van de Pavert progressed through De Graafschap's youth academy. He made his professional debut for the club on 18 December 2010, replacing Leon Broekhof in the 89th minute of a 4–0 Eredivisie loss to SC Heerenveen.

He scored his first goal in professional football on 7 August 2011, opening the score by heading in a corner-kick in an eventual 4–1 home loss to Ajax. He suffered relegation to the Eerste Divisie with De Graafschap in the 2011–12 season, losing out in the second round of play-offs to FC Den Bosch.

In three subsequent Eerste Divisie season, De Graafschap would then reach the play-offs for promotion with Van de Pavert; eventually winning promotion back to the Eredivisie in 2015 after a win over FC Volendam. With De Graafschap he finished the 2015–16 season seventeenth place, which also meant participation in the 2016 editions of the play-offs, the fifth season in a row for the club.

Van de Pavert made 157 total appearances for De Graafschap, in which he scored eight goals.

=== PEC Zwolle ===
On 27 May 2016, Van de Pavert signed a three-year contract with PEC Zwolle, who had finished eighth in the Eredivisie the previous season. He made his competitive debut for the club on the first matchday of the 2016–17 Eredivisie season, starting at centre-back alongside Dirk Marcellis in a 1–1 away draw against NEC.

Van de Pavert played one season for PEC in which he made 26 total appearances, scoring two goals.

=== NEC ===
After the one season in Zwolle, Van de Pavert was sent on a one-season loan to NEC competing in the second-tier Eerste Divisie. The club also negotiated an option to buy. He appeared in the starting lineup on the first matchday of the season against Almere City. On 25 October 2017, Van de Pavert scored his first goal for NEC in a game against Jong PSV which ended in a 3–3 draw.

=== Return to De Graafschap ===
Van de Pavert returned to his first club De Graafschap on 30 June 2018, signing a two-year contract.

=== Roda JC ===
On 3 August 2022, Van de Pavert joined Roda JC on a one-year contract. He made his debut for the club two days later, replacing Phil Sieben in the 90th minute of a 2–0 away win over Dordrecht on the first matchday of the 2022–23 season. On 30 September he made his first start for Roda, also scoring his first goal for the club in a 2–1 league loss to Almere City. Van de Pavert left Roda at the end of the 2022–23 season, as his contract was not extended.

Van de Pavert announced his retirement after leaving Roda JC, and he was appointed youth coach at his former club De Graafschap in October 2023.

== International career ==
Van de Pavert gained his first and only international cap for the Netherlands U20s on 6 February 2013, coming on as a half-time substitute for Stefano Denswil in a 3–0 loss to Republic of Ireland U21 at Tallaght Stadium.

== Later career ==
After retiring from professional football, Van de Pavert returned to De Graafschap, where he began coaching the club's youth sides, taking charge of the under-14s in 2023 before moving up to serve as assistant coach of the under-21 team. In 2024, he resumed playing, joining lowly Eerste Klasse club SDOUC of Ulft as a forward. In February 2026, Van de Pavert extended his contract at De Graafschap, by which point he had been appointed coach of the under-19s.

== Career statistics ==
Appearances and goals by club, season and competition
Club	Season	League			KNVB Cup		Other		Total	
Club	Season	Division	Apps	Goals	Apps	Goals	Apps	Goals	Apps	Goals
De Graafschap	2010–11	Eredivisie	2	0	0	0	—		2	0
De Graafschap	2011–12	Eredivisie	29	2	1	0	2 (Note: Appearances in Eredivisie promotion/relegation playoffs)	0	32	2
De Graafschap	2012–13	Eerste Divisie	21	1	2	0	—		23	1
De Graafschap	2013–14	Eerste Divisie	34	2	1	0	4	0	39	2
De Graafschap	2014–15	Eerste Divisie	22	0	2	0	6	1	30	1
De Graafschap	2015–16	Eredivisie	28	2	0	0	3	0	31	2
De Graafschap	Total		136	7	6	0	15	1	157	8
PEC Zwolle	2016–17	Eredivisie	23	2	3	0	—		26	2
NEC (loan)	2017–18	Eerste Divisie	27	2	2	0	1	0	30	2
De Graafschap	2018–19	Eredivisie	20	0	0	0	0	0	20	0
De Graafschap	2019–20	Eerste Divisie	25	1	0	0	—		25	1
De Graafschap	2020–21	Eerste Divisie	36	3	2	0	1	1	39	4
De Graafschap	2021–22	Eerste Divisie	30	1	0	0	2	0	32	1
De Graafschap	Total		111	5	2	0	3	1	116	6
Roda JC	2022–23	Eerste Divisie	23	1	1	0	—		24	1
Career total			320	35	14	0	19	2	353	37
