= Maarten Paes =

Indonesian footballer (born 1998)

- Paes with Indonesia in 2024

Personal information
- Full name: Maarten Vincent Paes
- Date of birth: 14 May 1998 (age 28)
- Place of birth: Nijmegen, Netherlands
- Height: 1.91 m (6 ft 3 in)
- Position: Goalkeeper

Team information
- Current team: Ajax
- Number: 26

Youth career
- 2009–2012: VV Union
- 2012–2016: NEC

Senior career*
Years	Team	Apps	(Gls)
2016–2018	NEC	0	(0)
2018–2022	Utrecht	44	(0)
2018–2022	Jong Utrecht	18	(0)
2022–2026	FC Dallas	114	(0)
2026–	Ajax	13	(0)

International career^{‡}
2016–2017	Netherlands U19	2	(0)
2018	Netherlands U20	2	(0)
2019–2021	Netherlands U21	5	(0)
2024–	Indonesia	14	(0)
Medal record
Men's football
Representing Indonesia
FIFA ASEAN Cup
Winner	2026 Indonesia	Team
FIFA Series
Runner-up	2026 Indonesia
- * Club domestic league appearances and goals as of 22 November 2026 ‡ National team caps and goals as of 28 September 2026

Maarten Vincent Paes (Dutch pronunciation: [ˈmaːrtə(m) ˈpaːs]; born 14 May 1998) is a professional footballer who plays as a goalkeeper for Eredivisie club Ajax. Born in the Netherlands, he plays for the Indonesia national team.

== Club career ==
=== NEC ===
In the 2017–18 season, Paes served as a backup goalkeeper to Joris Delle at NEC.

=== Utrecht ===
In 2018, Paes had the opportunity to join FC Utrecht, where he became the reserve goalkeeper behind David Jensen and Nick Marsman. He made his debut for the club on 19 August 2018, in a 2–0 home victory against PEC Zwolle. Paes was given the opportunity to play as Jensen was ill, and Marsman was absent due to injury. This was his only match for the first team during the 2018/19 season, although he did play several matches for Jong FC Utrecht during that campaign.

At the start of the 2019/20 season, Paes surprisingly became FC Utrecht's first-choice goalkeeper. However, during the winter break, he had an awful shoulder blade injury that required around six months of recuperation. As a result, FC Utrecht chose to loan PSV's Jeroen Zoet for six months during the winter transfer window. Zoet had lost his starting spot early in the season to Lars Unnerstall.

The 2020/21 season was a rollercoaster for FC Utrecht's goalkeeping position. Paes started the season as the first-choice goalkeeper, but after a few games, he was replaced by Thijmen Nijhuis. Following the departure of John van der Brom, Paes returned to the starting lineup for a brief while. Ultimately, Eric Oelschlägel made the most appearances in goal that season.

Paes was sidelined from the starting lineup for the 2021/22 season, with Fabian de Keijzer taking over during the winter. However, an injury to Fabian de Keijzer in early May allowed Eric Oelschlägel to walk onto the pitch, becoming one of three goalkeepers to do so that season.

=== FC Dallas ===
On 20 January 2022, Paes joined MLS side FC Dallas on a six-month loan. On 24 June 2022, Dallas exercised the option to make the transfer permanent.

=== Ajax ===
Paes playing for Ajax in April 2026

On 2 February 2026, Paes officially joined Eredivisie club Ajax on a three and a half-year contract until 30 June 2029. On 21 February 2026, Paes made his debut in a 1–1 draw against NEC, in which he made 7 saves.

On 24 May 2026, Paes helped the team advanced to the 2026–27 UEFA Conference League second qualifying round in a penalty shootout by saving two penalties kick against his former club, Utrecht in the European competition play-off final.

== International career ==
Paes was a member of the Netherlands under-19 squads for both 2016 UEFA European Under-19 Championship and 2017 UEFA European Under-19 Championship, but he did not appear in any games, serving as backup to Yanick van Osch and Justin Bijlow respectively.

In January 2024, Paes confirmed that he had decided to represent Indonesia at international level. He was eligible to represent Indonesia through his maternal grandmother who was born in Kediri.

On 30 April 2024, he received Indonesian citizenship through naturalization, then needing permission from FIFA to become eligible to play for the national team. Having originally declared for the nation in January 2023, he was found to be ineligible, as he had represented the Netherlands under-21s at 22 years old, running into a FIFA regulation declaring that a player who has appeared for a national team at a competitive level over the age of 21 cannot change their national team. On 18 August 2024, PSSI chairman Erick Thohir announced that the change of his sports citizenship from Dutch to Indonesian has been officially approved by FIFA, making him available for the Indonesia national football team after a lengthy process.

In September 2024, Paes was called up for the 2026 FIFA World Cup qualifiers. He made his debut on 5 September in a 1–1 draw against Saudi Arabia. In the match, Paes committed a foul inside the penalty box but managed to save the ensuing penalty kick by Salem Al-Dawsari. As a result, he was named the man of the match.

In the next match on 10 September 2024 against Australia, Paes managed to keep a clean-sheet in a 0–0 draw.

== Personal life ==
Paes was born and raised in the Netherlands. His maternal grandmother, who was ethnically Dutch, was born in Kediri, East Java, when it was called the Dutch East Indies.

On 8 March 2024, FC Dallas announced that Paes had obtained a United States green card, granting him permanent resident status in the United States and counting him as a domestic player under MLS roster rules.

Paes was also seen to be eligible to represent Indonesia at international level as a result of his background. Paes' naturalization initially faced legal issue because his grandmother was not actually Indonesian despite being born in Kediri. Indonesia follows jus sanguinis, and not jus soli. Paes later received citizenship from President Joko Widodo for his achievement in sports and therefore he became eligible to represent Indonesia at international level.

On 30 April 2024, Paes officially obtained Indonesian citizenship.

== Career statistics ==
=== Club ===
As of match played 22 November 2026

Appearances and goals by club, season and competition
Club	Season	League			National cup (Note: Includes KNVB Cup, U.S. Open Cup)		Continental		Other		Total	
Club	Season	Division	Apps	Goals	Apps	Goals	Apps	Goals	Apps	Goals	Apps	Goals
NEC	2016–17	Eredivisie	0	0	0	0	—		—		0	0
NEC	2017–18	Eerste Divisie	0	0	0	0	—		—		0	0
NEC	Total		0	0	0	0	—		—		0	0
Jong Utrecht	2018–19	Eerste Divisie	9	0	0	0	—		—		9	0
Jong Utrecht	2019–20	Eerste Divisie	9	0	0	0	—		—		9	0
Jong Utrecht	Total		18	0	0	0	—		—		18	0
Utrecht	2018–19	Eredivisie	1	0	0	0	—		—		1	0
Utrecht	2019–20	Eredivisie	18	0	1	0	0	0	—		19	0
Utrecht	2020–21	Eredivisie	8	0	1	0	—		—		9	0
Utrecht	2021–22	Eredivisie	17	0	2	0	—		—		19	0
Utrecht	Total		44	0	4	0	0	0	—		48	0
FC Dallas	2022	Major League; Soccer	32	0	0	0	—		2 (Note: Appearances in MLS Cup Playoffs)	0	34	0
FC Dallas	2023	Major League; Soccer	30	0	0	0	—		6 (Note: Three appearances in Leagues Cup, and three apeappearances in MLS Cup Playoffs)	0	36	0
FC Dallas	2024	Major League; Soccer	30	0	3	0	—		2 (Note: Appearances in Leagues Cup)	0	35	0
FC Dallas	2025	Major League; Soccer	22	0	1	0	—		0	0	23	0
FC Dallas	Total		114	0	4	0	—		10	0	128	0
Ajax	2025–26	Eredivisie	11	0	0	0	—		2 (Note: Appearance(s) in European competition play-offs)	0	13	0
Ajax	2026–27	Eredivisie	2	0	0	0	4 (Note: Appearance(s) in UEFA Conference League)	0	—		6	0
Ajax	Total		13	0	0	0	4	0	2	0	19	0
Career total			189	0	8	0	4	0	12	0	213	0

=== International ===
As of match played 28 September 2026

Appearances and goals by national team and year
National team	Year	Apps	Goals
Indonesia	2024	6	0
Indonesia	2025	4	0
Indonesia	2026	4	0
Total		14	0

== Honours ==
FC Dallas

- Copa Tejas: 2024

Indonesia

- FIFA ASEAN Cup: 2026
- FIFA Series runner-up: 2026

Individual

- MLS All-Star: 2024
- MLS Save of the Year: 2024
- PSSI Awards Men's Goalkeeper of the Year: 2026

== See also ==
- List of Indonesia international footballers born outside Indonesia
