= Zineddine Bourebaba =

French footballer (born 2002)

Personal information
- Full name: Zineddine Dilan Bourebaba
- Date of birth: 28 September 2002 (age 24)
- Place of birth: Évry, Paris, France
- Height: 1.74 m (5 ft 9 in)
- Position: Midfielder

Team information
- Current team: Ouest Tourangeau

Youth career
- 2008–2016: Savigny-le-Temple
- RC Fontainebleau
- Paris FC
- 2017–2019: AS Monaco
- 2019–2020: Utrecht

Senior career*
Years	Team	Apps	(Gls)
2020–2021	Jong FC Utrecht	2	(0)
2023–	Ouest Tourangeau	11	(0)
- * Club domestic league appearances and goals as of 18 May 2024

Zineddine Bourebaba (born 28 September 2002) is a French footballer who plays as a midfielder for Championnat National 3 club Ouest Tourangeau.

== Career ==
Zineddine Bourebaba played in the youth team of Savigny Le Temple FC, RC Fontainebleau, Paris FC, AS Monaco and FC Utrecht. In 2020 he made the switch to Jong FC Utrecht, where he made on 14 September 2020 his debut in professional football in the 1-2 lost home game against Jong AZ. He started in the starting line-up and got his second yellow card in the 90+3rd minute and had to leave the field. After a short entrance against Roda JC Kerkrade, his contract with Utrecht was terminated by mutual agreement in early February 2021 due to private circumstances.
