= Julliani Eersteling =

Dutch footballer

Personal information
- Date of birth: 27 October 2001 (age 25)
- Place of birth: Rotterdam, Netherlands
- Height: 1.81 m (5 ft 11 in)
- Position: Defender

Team information
- Current team: Lincoln Red Imps
- Number: 66

Youth career
- –2018: Sparta Rotterdam

Senior career*
Years	Team	Apps	(Gls)
2018–2020	Jong Sparta	5	(0)
2020–2021	Go Ahead Eagles	20	(0)
2021–2023	Jong FC Utrecht	50	(1)
2023–2024	Ayia Napa	4	(0)
2025–2026	Europa Point	14	(1)
2026–	Lincoln Red Imps	12	(0)
- * Club domestic league appearances and goals as of 1 November 2026

Julliani Eersteling (born 27 October 2001) is a Dutch professional footballer who plays as a defender for Gibraltar Football League club Lincoln Red Imps.

== Club career ==
Eersteling played in the youth department of Sparta Rotterdam. In the 2018–19 season, he made five appearances for Jong Sparta in the Tweede Divisie.

In 2020, he left on a free transfer to Go Ahead Eagles, where he initially joined the under-21 team. He made his professional debut for Go Ahead on 11 September 2020, in the 2–0 win against SC Cambuur, coming on for Bradly van Hoeven in the 88th minute. He made a total of 20 appearances in the Eerste Divisie for Go Ahead, who finished second and thus won promotion to the Eredivisie.

On 30 July 2021, Eersteling signed a two-year contract with FC Utrecht, initially joining the reserve team Jong FC Utrecht.

On 13 September 2023, Eersteling joined Cypricot side Ayia Napa.

On 12 August 2025, he signed for Europa Point of the Gibraltar Football League. After half a season at the club, he was signed by league rivals Lincoln Red Imps on 27 January 2026.
