= Gio-Renys Felicia =

Footballer (born 2004)

Personal information
- Full name: Gio-Renys Girigorio Felicia
- Date of birth: 2 February 2004 (age 22)
- Place of birth: Rotterdam, Netherlands
- Position: Winger

Team information
- Current team: Piteå IF
- Number: 26

Youth career
- ZVV Pelikaan
- 2013–2022: Feyenoord

Senior career*
Years	Team	Apps	(Gls)
2022–2023	Jong Utrecht	18	(0)
2024	VVV-Venlo	0	(0)
2025	Pogoń-Sokół Lubaczów	12	(2)
2025-2026	Dordrecht U21		
2026-	Piteå IF	3	(0)

International career^{‡}
2019	Netherlands U15	1	(0)
2021	Curaçao U20	4	(3)
2024–	Bonaire	2	(1)
- * Club domestic league appearances and goals as of 16 November 2026 ‡ National team caps and goals as of 4 June 2024

Gio-Renys Girigorio Felicia (born 2 February 2004) is a professional footballer who plays as a winger for Swedish club Piteå IF and the Bonaire national team. Born in the Netherlands, he has represented the Netherlands and Curaçao at youth international level before switching his allegiance to Bonaire.

== Club career ==
A former player of ZVV Pelikaan, Felicia joined Feyenoord Academy in 2013. On 3 June 2022, Utrecht announced the joining of Felicia on a three-year deal until June 2025. His contract was terminated by mutual consent on 15 August 2023.

On 9 January 2025, following a short stint at VVV-Venlo, Felicia joined Polish fourth-tier club Pogoń-Sokół Lubaczów. After scoring twice and recording one assist in 12 league appearances, Felicia left Pogoń-Sokół by mutual consent on 25 June 2025.

He joined the Dordrecht U21 team in summer 2025.

== International career ==
Felicia has represented the Netherlands and Curaçao at youth international level, before opting to play for Bonaire at senior level.

In May 2019, Felicia was named in the Netherlands under-15 squad for two friendly matches against Germany. He played his only match for the team on 11 May in a 2–0 loss. In November 2021, he played for the Curaçao under-20 team at the 2022 CONCACAF U-20 Championship qualifying stage.

Felicia received his first call-up to the Bonaire national team in March 2024. He made his debut for Bonaire on 20 March 2024 in a 1–1 draw against El Salvador.

== Career statistics ==
=== International ===
As of match played 4 June 2024

Appearances and goals by national team and year
National team	Year	Apps	Goals
Bonaire	2024	2	1
Total		2	1

Scores and results list Bonaire's goal tally first, score column indicates score after each Felicia goal.

List of international goals scored by Gio-Renys Felicia
No.	Date	Venue	Opponent	Score	Result	Competition
1	4 June 2024	Sportpark De Waaijenberg, Arnhem, Netherlands	Sint Maarten	1–1	1–3	Friendly
