= Jozhua Vertrouwd =

Dutch footballer (born 2004)

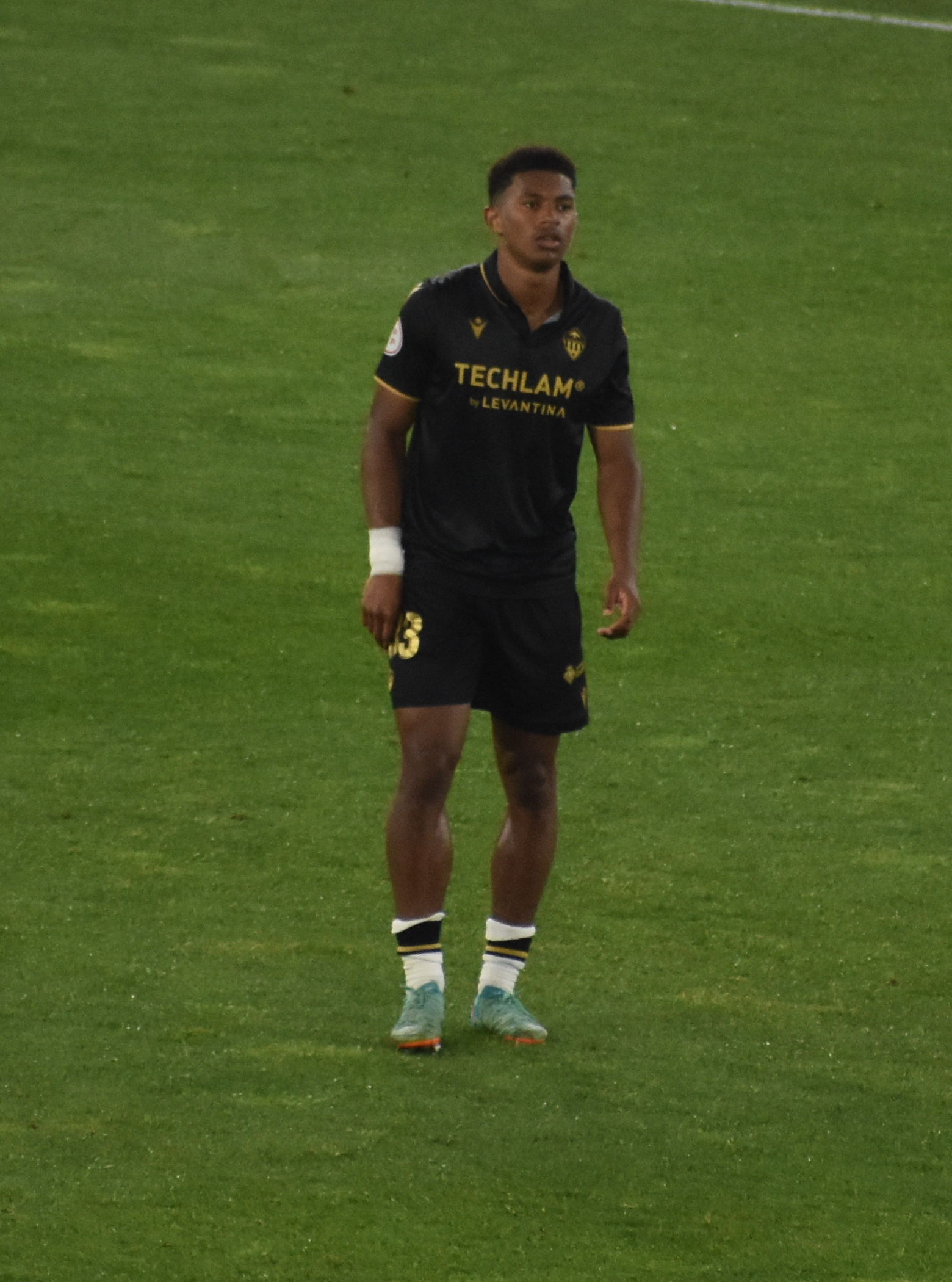
- Vertrouwd playing for Castellón in 2024

Personal information
- Full name: Jozhua Thomayo Vertrouwd
- Date of birth: 21 August 2004 (age 22)
- Place of birth: Amsterdam, Netherlands
- Height: 1.87 m (6 ft 2 in)
- Positions: Centre-back; left-back

Team information
- Current team: Rayo Vallecano
- Number: 33

Youth career
- Fortuna Wormerveer
- 2016–2017: AZ
- 2017–2020: HVV Hollandia
- 2020–2021: Volendam

Senior career*
Years	Team	Apps	(Gls)
2021–2022	Jong Volendam	17	(0)
2022	Volendam	8	(0)
2022–2023	Jong Utrecht	14	(0)
2023–2024	Castellón B	4	(0)
2023–2026	Castellón	54	(2)
2025–2026	→ Rayo Vallecano (loan)	9	(0)
2026–	Rayo Vallecano	3	(0)

International career^{‡}
2025	Netherlands U21	1	(0)
- * Club domestic league appearances and goals as of 24 October 2026 ‡ National team caps and goals as of 14 October 2025

Jozhua Thomayo Vertrouwd (born 21 August 2004) is a Dutch professional footballer who plays as either a centre-back or a left-back for La Liga club Rayo Vallecano.

== Career ==
Born in Amsterdam, Vertrouwd played for the youth sides of Fortuna Wormerveer, AZ Alkmaar and HVV Hollandia before joining FC Volendam in 2020. After playing for Jong Volendam in the Tweede Divisie, he made his first team debut on 25 February 2022, coming on as a second-half substitute for Achraf Douiri in a 4–1 Eerste Divisie home routing of Helmond Sport.

On 10 May 2022, after eight first team matches, Vertrouwd moved to FC Utrecht; he was assigned to Jong Utrecht also in the second division. On 28 August 2023, he moved to Spain and signed a contract with Primera Federación side Castellón) .

A backup to Salva Ruiz, Vertrouwd contributed with one goal in 25 appearances overall (aside from four matches with the reserves) as the Orelluts achieved promotion to Segunda División. He subsequently became a regular starter, and renewed his contract until 2027 on 5 March 2025.

Vertrouwd scored his first professional goal on 17 March 2025, netting his side's second in a 2–2 home draw against Deportivo de La Coruña. He finished the campaign as a first-choice, appearing in 35 matches overall.

On 12 August 2025, Vertrouwd joined La Liga side Rayo Vallecano on a one-year loan deal, with an obligatory buyout clause. He made his top tier debut on 14 September, replacing injured Luiz Felipe in the first half of a 2–0 away loss to Osasuna.

== Career statistics ==
As of match played 24 October 2026

Appearances and goals by club, season and competition
Club	Season	League			Cup		Europe		Other		Total	
Club	Season	Division	Apps	Goals	Apps	Goals	Apps	Goals	Apps	Goals	Apps	Goals
Jong Volendam	2021–22	Tweede Divisie	17	0	—		—		0	0	17	0
FC Volendam	2022–23	Eerste Divisie	8	0	—		—		—		8	0
Jong Utrecht	2022–23	Eerste Divisie	14	0	—		—		—		14	0
Castellón B	2023–24	Tercera Federación	4	0	—		—		—		4	0
Castellón	2023–24	Primera Federación	21	1	2	0	—		2 (Note: Appearances in 2024 Primera Federación play-offs)	0	25	1
Castellón	2024–25	Segunda División	33	1	2	0	—		—		35	1
Castellón	Total		54	2	4	0	—		2	0	60	2
Rayo Vallecano (loan)	2025–26	La Liga	9	0	3	0	6 (Note: Appearances in UEFA Conference League)	0	—		18	0
Rayo Vallecano	2026–27	La Liga	3	0	0	0	—		—		3	0
Career total			109	2	7	0	6	0	2	0	124	2
