= Albert Lottin =

French footballer (born 2001)

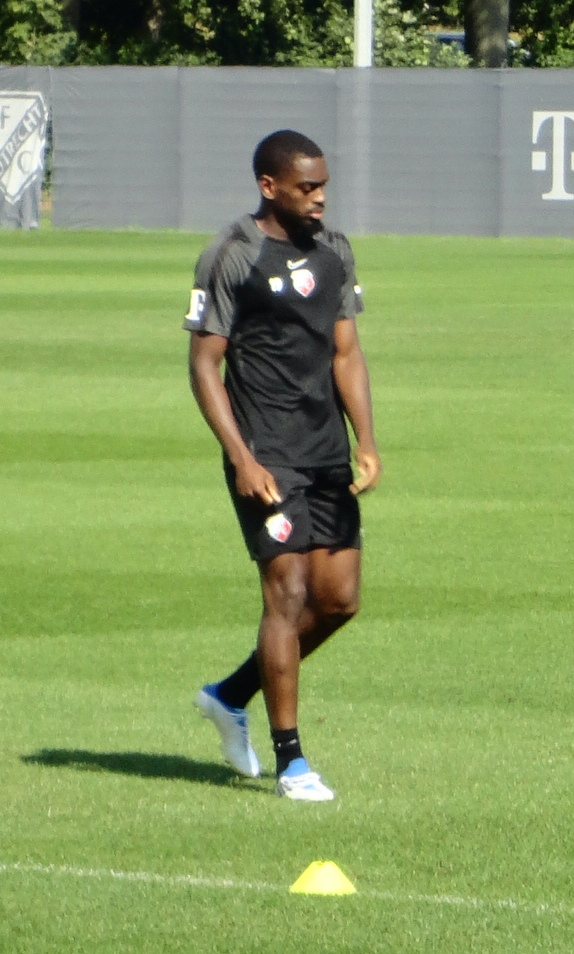

Personal information
- Full name: Albert-Nicolas Lottin
- Date of birth: 29 August 2001 (age 25)
- Place of birth: Paris, France
- Height: 1.80 m (5 ft 11 in)
- Position: Midfielder

Team information
- Current team: União Leiria
- Number: 18

Senior career*
| Years | Team | Apps | (Gls) |
| 2018–2020 | Bordeaux II | 15 | (0) |
| 2019–2020 | Bordeaux | 3 | (0) |
| 2020–2022 | Utrecht | 1 | (0) |
| 2020–2023 | Jong Utrecht | 54 | (3) |
| 2023 | Panachaiki | 7 | (0) |
| 2024–2026 | Castellón | 26 | (2) |
| 2025–2026 | → União Leiria (loan) | 16 | (1) |
| 2026– | União Leiria | 0 | (0) |
- * Club domestic league appearances and goals as of 19 June 2026

Albert-Nicolas Lottin (born 29 August 2001) is a French professional footballer who plays as a midfielder for Portuguese club União de Leiria.

== Career ==
On 14 December 2018, Lottin signed his first professional contract with his childhood club Bordeaux. He made his professional debut with Bordeaux in a 2–0 Ligue 1 win over Olympique de Marseille on 5 April 2019. On 1 September 2020, Lottin signed a contract until 2023 by FC Utrecht. He will starting by Jong FC Utrecht.

== Personal life ==
Born in France, Lottin holds both French and Cameroonian nationalities.
