= Mees Rijks =

Dutch footballer (born 2003)

Personal information
- Full name: Mees Rijks
- Date of birth: 8 March 2003 (age 23)
- Place of birth: Amstelveen, Netherlands
- Height: 1.88 m (6 ft 2 in)
- Position: Striker

Team information
- Current team: Forest Green Rovers (on loan from Bristol Rovers)

Youth career
- –2014: Abcoude
- 2014–2015: AFC
- 2015–2021: FC Utrecht

Senior career*
Years	Team	Apps	(Gls)
2021–2024	Jong FC Utrecht	92	(20)
2022	FC Utrecht	1	(0)
2024–2026	Vålerenga	41	(14)
2025–2026	→ De Graafschap (loan)	5	(0)
2026–	Bristol Rovers	13	(1)
2026–	→ Forest Green Rovers (loan)	1	(0)

International career
2019	Netherlands U17	2	(0)
2021–2022	Netherlands U19	7	(1)
- * Club domestic league appearances and goals as of 12:54, 24 September 2026 (UTC)

Mees Rijks (born 8 March 2003) is a Dutch professional footballer who plays as a striker for Forest Green Rovers on loan from EFL League Two club Bristol Rovers.

== Club career ==
=== FC Utrecht ===
He played as a youngster for FC Abcoude and Amsterdamsche FC prior to joining the youth academy at FC Utrecht. After four years progressing through their youth ranks, Rijks signed his first professional contract in June 2019 at the age of 16 years-old, agreeing to a two-year deal, with the option for an additional season.

Rijks made his debut in the Eerste Divisie for Jong FC Utrecht in the 2020–21 season as a second-half substitute in an 0–1 defeat against MVV Maastricht on 5 March 2021. Rijks scored his first goal in the Eerste Divisie against FC Eindhoven on the 12 May 2021, getting the first for his side in a 2–2 away draw. After finding the net again at the start of the 2021–22 season, Rijks signed a new professional contract with Utrecht at the age of 18 years-old in September 2021, extending his contract until 2023.

On 13 March 2022, Rijks made his Eredivisie debut for the senior FC Utrecht side, appearing as an 82nd-minute substitute in a 0–1 home defeat against PSV Eindhoven.

=== Vålerenga ===
On 12 February 2024, Rijks signed a three-year contract with Vålerenga in Norway. He scored his first league goal for the club in April 2024 against Stabaek in a 1–3 defeat for his side. Following their promotion to the Eliteserien, he made his debut in that division for Vālerenga in a 3–1 win over Viking FK on 30 March 2025.

On 4 August 2025, Rijks returned to the Netherlands, joining Eerste Divisie club De Graafschap on a season-long loan deal.

=== Bristol Rovers ===
On 27 January 2026, Rijks joined EFL League Two club Bristol Rovers on a two-and-a-half year deal for an undisclosed fee. Having mainly featured from the bench in his early months with the club, he scored his goal in English football on 11 April, scoring the second in a 3–1 victory over Crawley Town.

On 18 September 2026, Rijks joined National League club Forest Green Rovers on a three-month loan deal. He suffered an injury after just one appearance for the club, returning to Bristol Rovers for his rehabilitation.

== International career ==
Rijks played for Netherlands U19 in the 2022 UEFA European Under-19 Championship qualification matches.
