= Christopher Mamengi =

Dutch footballer

Personal information
- Date of birth: 3 April 2001 (age 25)
- Place of birth: Amersfoort, Netherlands
- Height: 1.78 m (5 ft 10 in)
- Position: Left back

Team information
- Current team: Prishtina
- Number: 34

Youth career
- FC Utrecht

Senior career*
Years	Team	Apps	(Gls)
2018–2023	Jong FC Utrecht	85	(4)
2019–2023	FC Utrecht	0	(0)
2023–2024	Jong Almere City	6	(0)
2023–2025	Almere City	16	(0)
2025–	Prishtina	23	(0)

International career^{‡}
2016–2017	Netherlands U16	2	(0)
2018	Netherlands U17	10	(0)
2018–2019	Netherlands U18	4	(0)
2019	Netherlands U19	2	(0)
Medal record
Representing Netherlands
UEFA European Under-17 Championship
Winner	England 2018	U-17 Team
- * Club domestic league appearances and goals as of 22 June 2026 ‡ National team caps and goals as of 23:25, 1 April 2020 (UTC)

Christopher Mamengi (born 3 April 2001) is a Dutch football player who plays as a left back for Kosovan club Prishtina.

== Club career ==
Mamengi signed his first professional football contract with FC Utrecht at age 16.

On 17 August 2023, Mamengi signed a contract with Almere City for three seasons with an option for fourth.

== Honours ==
Netherlands U17

- UEFA European Under-17 Championship: 2018
