= Nigel Owusu =

Dutch football player

Personal information
- Date of birth: 31 January 2003 (age 23)
- Place of birth: Netherlands
- Position: Left-back

Team information
- Current team: Lisse
- Number: 24

Youth career
- AVV Zeeburgia
- Ajax
- AZ Alkmaar
- ADO Den Haag

Senior career*
Years	Team	Apps	(Gls)
2022–2024	ADO Den Haag	3	(1)
2024–	Lisse	0	(0)
- * Club domestic league appearances and goals as of 20:23, 7 October 2024 (UTC)

Nigel Owusu (born 31 January 2003) is a Dutch footballer who plays as a left-back for Lisse.

== Career ==
Owusu was with AVV Zeeburgia prior to joining the youth academy at AFC Ajax Amsterdam in 2012. After a spell in the youth academy at AZ Alkmaar, he was signed by ADO Den Haag in October 2020 at the age of 17 years-old, signing an eighteen-month contract until the end of the 2021–22 season.

Owusu made his Eerste Divisie debut for ADO Den Haag on 6 May 2022 against FC Emmen. In May 2022, he signed a new contract with club for two more seasons, with the option of a third.

== Personal life ==
Born in the Netherlands, Owusu is of Ghanaian descent.
