= Phil Sieben =

German footballer (born 1999)

Personal information
- Full name: Phil Thierri Sieben
- Date of birth: 20 June 1999 (age 27)
- Place of birth: Lüneburg, Germany
- Height: 1.82 m (6 ft 0 in)
- Position: Midfielder

Team information
- Current team: Rot-Weiß Oberhausen
- Number: 7

Youth career
- VfL Lüneburg
- 2015: SC Paderborn
- 2016–2017: Schalke 04
- 2017–2020: SC Paderborn

Senior career*
Years	Team	Apps	(Gls)
2018–2020	SC Paderborn II	45	(7)
2020–2022	Fortuna Düsseldorf II	52	(5)
2021–2022	Fortuna Düsseldorf	2	(0)
2022–2023	Roda JC	25	(1)
2024	Rot-Weiß Oberhausen	13	(0)
2024	Eintracht Norderstedt	15	(0)
2025–	Rot-Weiß Oberhausen	31	(1)
- * Club domestic league appearances and goals as of 24 June 2026

Phil Thierri Sieben (born 20 June 1999) is a German professional footballer who plays as a midfielder for Regionalliga West club Rot-Weiß Oberhausen.

== Career ==
=== SC Paderborn ===
Sieben played youth football for VfL Lüneburg, SC Paderborn and Schalke 04, before again returning to Paderborn in 2017. He suffered a knee injury in January 2017, sidelining him until September 2017. Towards the end of the 2017–18 season, he made his first appearances for SC Paderborn II in the Oberliga Westfalen. His debut for the reserves came on 21 April 2018, starting in a 4–2 loss to SV Lippstadt.

He was a permanent part of the reserves from the 2018–19 season, and he made a total of 45 appearances and seven goals for the team before leaving in 2020.

=== Fortuna Düsseldorf ===
On 6 July 2020, Sieben joined Fortuna Düsseldorf where he was set to become part of the reserve team. He made his debut for Fortuna Düsseldorf II in the Regionalliga West on 12 September 2020, starting in a 4–0 home win over VfB Homberg. On 25 November 2020, he scored his first goal for the reserves, opening the score against Borussia Mönchengladbach II in an eventual 2–1 victory.

In the 2021–22 season, he was promoted to the first team. He made his debut on 8 August 2021 in the first round of the DFB-Pokal, replacing Shinta Appelkamp in the 63rd minute of a 5–0 victory. Sieben made his debut in the 2. Bundesliga for Fortuna Düsseldorf on 23 October 2021 in a 3–1 win over Karlsruher SC, coming on as a substitute for Marcel Sobottka. In November 2021, Sieben pulled a hamstring which sidelined him for some time.

=== Roda JC ===
Sieben joined Eerste Divisie club Roda JC on 10 June 2022 after he had been scouted by Toine van Mierlo. He signed a contract for two seasons with an option for a third, joining on a free transfer.

Sieben made his debut in the Eerste Divisie for Roda in a 2–0 win against FC Dordrecht on 5 August 2022. On 28 October 2022, he scored his first goal for the club in a 4–1 victory against Jong Utrecht.

On 1 September 2023, Sieben's contract with Roda was terminated by mutual consent. From September 2023, he trained with German side Lüneburger SK Hansa.

=== Rot-Weiß Oberhausen ===
On 31 January 2024, Sieben joined Regionalliga West club Rot-Weiß Oberhausen.

== Career statistics ==
As of match played 4 July 2024

Appearances and goals by club, season and competition
Club	Season	League			National cup (Note: Includes DFB-Pokal and KNVB Cup)		Other		Total	
Club	Season	Division	Apps	Goals	Apps	Goals	Apps	Goals	Apps	Goals
SC Paderborn II	2017–18	Oberliga Westfalen	4	1	—		—		4	1
SC Paderborn II	2018–19	Oberliga Westfalen	25	3	—		—		25	3
SC Paderborn II	2019–20	Oberliga Westfalen	16	3	—		—		16	3
SC Paderborn II	Total		45	7	—		—		45	7
Fortuna Düsseldorf II	2020–21	Regionalliga West	28	2	—		—		28	2
Fortuna Düsseldorf II	2021–22	Regionalliga West	24	3	—		—		24	3
Fortuna Düsseldorf II	Total		52	5	—		—		52	5
Fortuna Düsseldorf	2021–22	2. Bundesliga	2	0	1	0	—		3	0
Roda JC	2022–23	Eerste Divisie	25	1	1	0	—		26	1
Rot-Weiß Oberhausen	2023–24	Regionalliga West	13	0	0	0	—		13	0
Career total			137	13	2	0	—		139	13
