= Fabian de Keijzer =

Dutch footballer (born 2000)

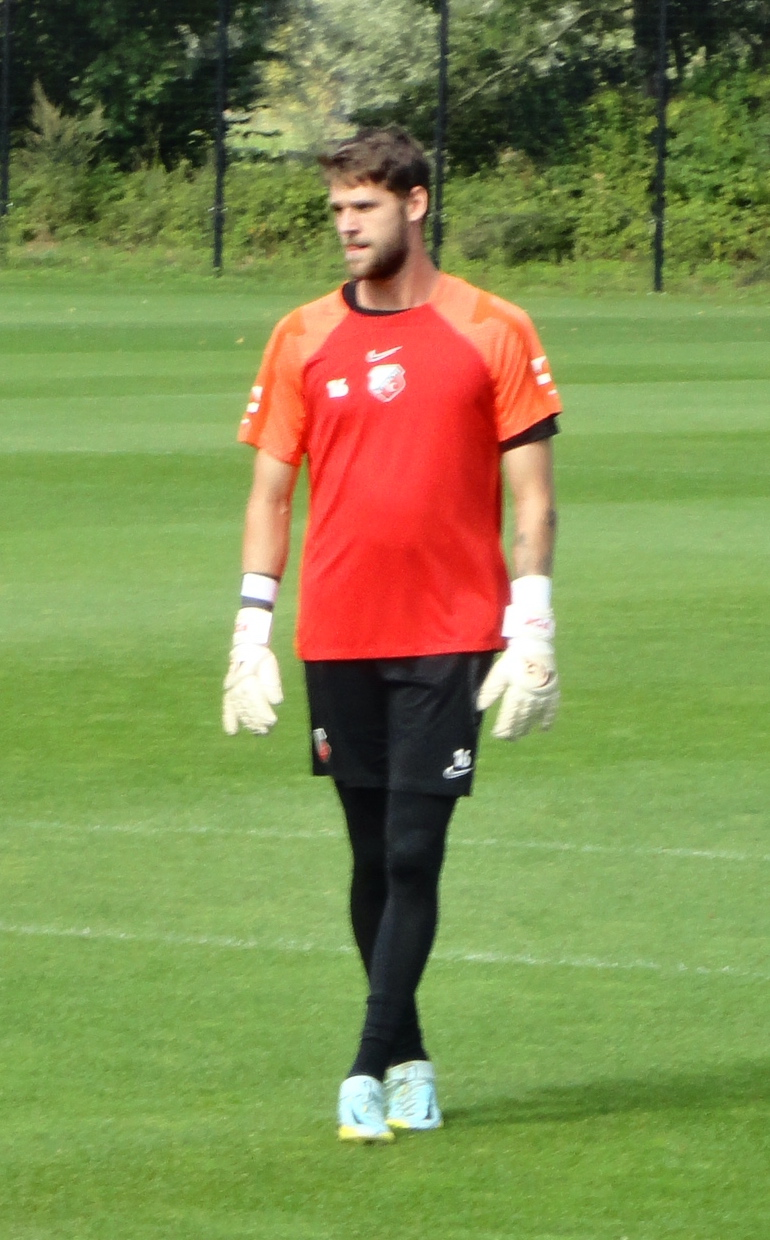

Personal information
- Date of birth: 10 May 2000 (age 26)
- Place of birth: Leusden, Netherlands
- Height: 1.93 m (6 ft 4 in)
- Position: Goalkeeper

Team information
- Current team: Heracles Almelo
- Number: 16

Youth career
- Roda '46
- Utrecht

Senior career*
Years	Team	Apps	(Gls)
2017–2023	Jong Utrecht	62	(0)
2019–2023	Utrecht	16	(0)
2023–	Heracles Almelo	42	(0)

International career^{‡}
2016–2017	Netherlands U17	5	(0)
2017–2018	Netherlands U18	3	(0)
2018	Netherlands U19	2	(0)
2019	Netherlands U20	3	(0)
2021	Netherlands U21	1	(0)
- * Club domestic league appearances and goals as of 5 October 2025 ‡ National team caps and goals as of 7 September 2021

Fabian de Keijzer (born 10 May 2000) is a Dutch professional footballer who plays as a goalkeeper for Eerste Divisie club Heracles Almelo.

== Club career ==
He made his Eerste Divisie debut for Jong FC Utrecht on 3 December 2018 in a game against Den Bosch, as a starter. He was reported to become the senior Utrecht side's first goalkeeper in January 2022. He made his Eredivisie debut for the senior side on 16 January 2022 against Ajax. He remained Utrecht's starting goalkeeper for the remainder of the 2021–22 season. In the 2022–23 season, de Keijzer moved to the bench again with the transfer of Vasilis Barkas.

On 11 August 2023, de Keijzer signed a four-year contract with Heracles Almelo.

== International ==
He was part of the squad for Netherlands U17 at the 2017 UEFA European Under-17 Championship, but did not play any games at the tournament, serving as backup to Jasper Schendelaar. Early in 2003, he was called up for several friendlies by Netherlands U21 in preparation for the 2023 UEFA European Under-21 Championship, but was not selected for the tournament squad.

== Career statistics ==
As of match played 14 January 2026

Appearances and goals by club, season and competition
Club	Season	League			Cup		Europe		Other		Total	
Club	Season	Division	Apps	Goals	Apps	Goals	Apps	Goals	Apps	Goals	Apps	Goals
Jong Utrecht	2016–17	Eerste Divisie	0	0	—		—		—		0	0
Jong Utrecht	2017–18	Eerste Divisie	0	0	—		—		—		0	0
Jong Utrecht	2018–19	Eerste Divisie	6	0	—		—		—		0	0
Jong Utrecht	2019–20	Eerste Divisie	21	0	—		—		—		14	0
Jong Utrecht	2020–21	Eerste Divisie	7	0	—		—		—		7	0
Jong Utrecht	2021–22	Eerste Divisie	17	0	—		—		—		17	0
Jong Utrecht	2022–23	Eerste Divisie	11	0	—		—		—		11	0
Jong Utrecht	Total		62	0	—		—		—		62	0
Utrecht	2019–20	Eredivisie	0	0	0	0	—		—		0	0
Utrecht	2020–21	Eredivisie	0	0	0	0	—		—		0	0
Utrecht	2021–22	Eredivisie	14	0	0	0	—		—		14	0
Utrecht	2022–23	Eredivisie	2	0	0	0	—		0	0	2	0
Utrecht	Total		16	0	0	0	—		0	0	16	0
Heracles Almelo	2023–24	Eredivisie	0	0	1	0	—		—		1	0
Heracles Almelo	2024–25	Eredivisie	34	0	4	0	—		—		38	0
Heracles Almelo	2025–26	Eredivisie	8	0	2	0	—		—		10	0
Heracles Almelo	Total		42	0	7	0	—		—		49	0
Career total			120	0	7	0	0	0	0	0	127	0

== Honours ==
Individual

- Eredivisie Team of the Month: April 2022, January 2025
