= 2021–22 Eerste Divisie =

66th season of the second-tier football league in Netherlands

Eerste Divisie
- Season: 2021 – 2022
- Dates: 6 August 2021 – 6 May 2022
- Champions: FC Emmen
- Promoted: FC Emmen; FC Volendam; Excelsior
- Matches played: 380
- Goals scored: 1,165 (3.07 per match)
- Top goalscorer: Thijs Dallinga (32 goals)
- Biggest home win: FC Emmen 7–1 MVV Maastricht (10 September 2021)
- Biggest away win: Jong FC Utrecht 0–6 FC Eindhoven (5 November 2021)
- Highest scoring: Jong Ajax 6–3 NAC Breda (13 September 2021); Jong Ajax 6–3 ADO Den Haag (7 March 2022)
- Longest winning run: 8 matches FC Eindhoven; ADO Den Haag
- Longest unbeaten run: 26 matches FC Volendam
- Longest winless run: 15 matches TOP Oss
- Longest losing run: 7 matches TOP Oss; MVV Maastricht
- All statistics correct as of 6 May 2022.

The 2021–22 Eerste Divisie, known as Keuken Kampioen Divisie for sponsorship reasons, was the 66th season of Eerste Divisie since its establishment in 1956.

It began on 6 August 2021, and ended with the promotion/relegation playoffs on 29 May 2022.

== Relegation for reserve teams ==
On 1 August 2020, the KNVB detailed on its website in what scenarios will the reserve teams in the league be relegated from the Eerste Divisie.

=== Relegation to the Tweede Divisie ===
- No reserve team from the Eerste Divisie can be relegated to the Tweede Divisie if the lowest classified reserves team in the Eerste Divisie is in the top 10.
- If the lowest classified reserve team in the Eerste Divisie finishes between 11th through 18th and the highest classified reserve team in the Tweede Divisie finishes first, the two teams play each other in a two-legged tie to decide which team will play in the Eerste Divisie the next season and which team will also play in the Tweede Divisie.
- If the lowest classified reserves in the Eerste Divisie finish 19th or 20th and the highest classified reserves in the Tweede Divisie finish first or second, the lowest classified team from the Eerste Divisie is relegated to the Tweede Divisie while the highest classified reserves in the Tweede Divisie are promoted to the Eerste Divisie.
- If a reserve team plays in the Eerste Divisie and the first team is relegated from the Eredivisie to the Eerste Divisie, the reserves are automatically relegated to the Tweede Divisie. In case this reserve team finished between first through third in the final ranking of reserves, the fourth-placed team is not relegated.

== Teams ==
=== Team changes ===
Promoted from 2020–21 Tweede Divisie	Relegated from 2020–21 Eredivisie	Promoted to 2021–22 Eredivisie	Relegated to 2021–22 Tweede Divisie
None	FC Emmen; VVV-Venlo; ADO Den Haag	SC Cambuur; Go Ahead Eagles; N.E.C.	None

A total of 20 teams will take part in the league: 17 teams from the 2020–21 Eerste Divisie and 3 teams relegated from the 2020–21 Eredivisie.

Location of teams in the Eerste Divisie 2020–21

=== Stadiums and locations ===
Club	Location	Venue	Capacity
ADO Den Haag	The Hague	Cars Jeans Stadion	15,000
Almere City FC	Almere	Yanmar Stadion	4,501
FC Den Bosch	's-Hertogenbosch	Stadion De Vliert	8,713
FC Dordrecht	Dordrecht	Riwal Hoogwerkers Stadion	4,235
FC Eindhoven	Eindhoven	Jan Louwers Stadion	4,600
FC Emmen	Emmen	De Oude Meerdijk	8,600
Excelsior	Rotterdam	Van Donge & De Roo Stadion	4,500
De Graafschap	Doetinchem	Stadion De Vijverberg	12,600
Helmond Sport	Helmond	SolarUnie Stadion	12,600
Jong Ajax	Amsterdam	Sportpark De Toekomst	2,050
Jong AZ	Alkmaar	AFAS Trainingscomplex	200
Jong PSV	Eindhoven	PSV Campus De Herdgang	2,500
Jong FC Utrecht	Utrecht	Sportcomplex Zoudenbalch	550
MVV Maastricht	Maastricht	Stadion De Geusselt	10,000
NAC Breda	Breda	Rat Verlegh Stadion	19,000
Roda JC Kerkrade	Kerkrade	Parkstad Limburg Stadion	19,979
Telstar	Velsen	Rabobank IJmond Stadion	3,060
TOP Oss	Oss	Frans Heesenstadion	4,560
FC Volendam	Volendam	Kras Stadion	7,384
VVV-Venlo	Venlo	Covebo Stadion - De Koel	8,000

=== Number of teams by provinces ===
Number of teams	Province	Team(s)
6	North Brabant	FC Den Bosch, FC Eindhoven, Helmond Sport, Jong PSV, NAC Breda, TOP Oss
4	North Holland	Jong Ajax, Jong AZ, Telstar, FC Volendam
3	Limburg	MVV Maastricht, Roda JC Kerkrade, VVV-Venlo
3	South Holland	ADO Den Haag, FC Dordrecht, Excelsior
1	Drenthe	FC Emmen
1	Flevoland	Almere City FC
1	Gelderland	De Graafschap
1	Utrecht	Jong FC Utrecht

=== Personnel ===
Note: Flags indicate national team as has been defined under FIFA eligibility rules. Players and Managers may hold more than one non-FIFA nationality.

Team	Manager	Captain	Shirt sponsor
ADO Den Haag	(Netherlands) Giovanni Franken	(Netherlands) Boy Kemper	Cars Jeans
Almere City FC	(Netherlands) Alex Pastoor	(Netherlands) Tim Receveur	SenS Online Solutions
FC Den Bosch	(Netherlands) Jack de Gier	(Netherlands) Wouter van der Steen	Timmermans Infra
FC Dordrecht	(Italy) Michele Santoni	(Netherlands) Jari Schuurman	Keukenwarenhuis.nl
FC Eindhoven	(Netherlands) Rob Penders	(Togo) Mawouna Amevor	VDL Groep
FC Emmen	(Netherlands) Dick Lukkien	(Netherlands) Jeroen Veldmate	EasyToys
Excelsior	(Netherlands) Marinus Dijkhuizen	(Netherlands) Redouan El Yaakoubi	DSW Zorgverzekeraar
De Graafschap	(Netherlands) Jan Vreman (a.i.)	(Netherlands) Ted van de Pavert	AgriBioSource
Helmond Sport	(Belgium) Sven Winnen	(Netherlands) Robin van der Meer	Vescom
Jong Ajax	(Netherlands) John Heitinga	(Netherlands) Youri Regeer	Ziggo
Jong AZ	(Belgium) Maarten Martens	(Netherlands) Joey Jacobs	AFAS Software
Jong PSV	(Netherlands) Ruud van Nistelrooy	(Curaçao) Shurandy Sambo	Metropoolregio Brainport Eindhoven
Jong FC Utrecht	(Bosnia and Herzegovina) Darije Kalezić	(Netherlands) Nick Venema	T-Mobile
MVV Maastricht	(Netherlands) Klaas Wels	(Netherlands) Sven Blummel	SuperGame
NAC Breda	(Netherlands) Edwin de Graaf	(Netherlands) Nick Olij	OK tankstations
Roda JC Kerkrade	(Netherlands) Jurgen Streppel	(Finland) Richard Jensen	Flow Traders Foundation
Telstar	(Netherlands) Andries Jonker	(Netherlands) Glynor Plet	BUKO
TOP Oss	(Belgium) Bob Peeters	(Netherlands) Rick Stuy van den Herik	Hendriks Bouw en Ontwikkeling
FC Volendam	(Netherlands) Wim Jonk	(Netherlands) Damon Mirani	HSB
VVV-Venlo	(Netherlands) Jos Luhukay	(Sweden) Kristopher Da Graca	Seacon

=== Managerial changes ===
Team	Outgoing manager	Manner of departure	Date of vacancy	Position in table	Replaced by	Date of appointment	Ref.
De Graafschap	(Netherlands) Mike Snoei	Sacked	19 May 2021	Pre season	(Netherlands) Reinier Robbemond	1 July 2021	
FC Eindhoven	(Netherlands) Ernie Brandts	Mutual consent	21 May 2021	Pre season	(Netherlands) Rob Penders	1 July 2021	
NAC Breda	(Netherlands) Maurice Steijn	Resigned	19 June 2021	Pre season	(Netherlands) Edwin de Graaf	14 July 2021	
Almere City FC	(Netherlands) Jeroen Rijsdijk	End of interim spell	30 June 2021	Pre season	(Netherlands) Gertjan Verbeek	1 July 2021	
FC Dordrecht	(Netherlands) Jan Zoutman	End of contract	30 June 2021	Pre season	(Italy) Michele Santoni	1 July 2021	
Jong Ajax	(Netherlands) Mitchell van der Gaag	Signed by Ajax	30 June 2021	Pre season	(Netherlands) John Heitinga	1 July 2021	
Jong AZ	(Netherlands) Michel Vonk	End of contract	30 June 2021	Pre season	(Belgium) Maarten Martens	1 July 2021	
Jong PSV	(Netherlands) Peter Uneken	End of contract	30 June 2021	Pre season	(Netherlands) Ruud van Nistelrooy	1 July 2021	
Jong FC Utrecht	(Netherlands) Ab Plugboer	End of interim spell	30 June 2021	Pre season	(Bosnia and Herzegovina) Darije Kalezić	1 July 2021	
MVV Maastricht	(Bosnia and Herzegovina) Darije Kalezić	End of contract	30 June 2021	Pre season	(Netherlands) Klaas Wels	1 July 2021	
TOP Oss	(Netherlands) Klaas Wels	End of contract	30 June 2021	Pre season	(Belgium) Bob Peeters	1 July 2021	
Almere City FC	(Netherlands) Gertjan Verbeek	Mutual consent	23 November 2021	18th	(Netherlands) Tim Bakens (a.i.)	23 November 2021	
Almere City FC	(Netherlands) Tim Bakens (a.i.)	End of interim spell	19 December 2021	19th	(Netherlands) Alex Pastoor	19 December 2021	
Helmond Sport	(Netherlands) Wil Boessen	Sacked	14 February 2022	19th	(Belgium) Sven Winnen	14 February 2022	
ADO Den Haag	(Netherlands) Ruud Brood	Sacked	28 February 2022	6th	(Netherlands) Giovanni Franken	28 February 2022	
De Graafschap	(Netherlands) Reinier Robbemond	Sacked	16 March 2022	9th	(Netherlands) Jan Vreman (a.i.)	16 March 2022	

== Standings ==
=== League table ===
Pos	Team	Pld	W	D	L	GF	GA	GD	Pts	Promotion or qualification
1	FC Emmen (Note: Winner of the Third and Fourth Period (Rounds 20–28 and 29–38)) (C, P)	38	26	5	7	64	24	+40	83	Promotion to the Eredivisie
2	FC Volendam (P)	38	21	12	5	81	53	+28	75	Promotion to the Eredivisie
3	FC Eindhoven	38	21	8	9	69	43	+26	71	Qualification to promotion play-offs
4	ADO Den Haag (Note: Winner of the First Period (Rounds 1–9))	38	22	7	9	76	53	+23	67 (Note: ADO Den Haag were deducted a total of six points for breaking the financial standards set by the Royal Dutch Football Association.)	Qualification to promotion play-offs
5	Roda JC Kerkrade	38	18	12	8	77	50	+27	66	Qualification to promotion play-offs
6	Excelsior (Note: Winner of the Second Period (Rounds 10–19)) (O, P)	38	19	9	10	82	57	+25	66	Qualification to promotion play-offs
7	Jong Ajax	38	18	9	11	82	63	+19	63	Reserve teams are not eligible to be promoted to the Eredivisie
8	NAC Breda	38	16	11	11	60	45	+15	59	Qualification to promotion play-offs
9	De Graafschap	38	15	11	12	52	43	+9	56	Qualification to promotion play-offs
10	VVV-Venlo	38	14	6	18	50	64	−14	48	
11	FC Den Bosch	38	14	5	19	42	61	−19	47	
12	Jong PSV	38	11	11	16	61	63	−2	44	Reserve teams are not eligible to be promoted to the Eredivisie
13	Jong AZ	38	12	6	20	39	50	−11	42	Reserve teams are not eligible to be promoted to the Eredivisie
14	Almere City FC	38	11	8	19	57	69	−12	41	
15	TOP Oss	38	11	8	19	48	62	−14	41	
16	MVV Maastricht	38	12	4	22	43	75	−32	40	
17	FC Dordrecht	38	10	9	19	53	77	−24	39	
18	Jong FC Utrecht	38	11	5	22	43	67	−24	38	Reserve teams are not eligible to be promoted to the Eredivisie
19	Telstar	38	8	11	19	47	74	−27	35	
20	Helmond Sport	38	8	7	23	39	72	−33	28 (Note: Helmond Sport were deducted a total of three points for failing to participate in the FC Emmen – Helmond Sport match, which was set on 14 January 2022.)	

Updated to match(es) played on 6 May 2022. Source: Soccerway, Keuken Kampioen Divisie (in Dutch)
Rules for classification: Season in progress: 1) Most points won; 2) Less points lost; 3) Goal difference; 4) Goals scored; 5) Alphabetical order; End of season: 1) Points; 2) Goal difference; 3) Goals scored; 4) Head-to-head points; 5) Head-to-head goal difference; 6) Head-to-head away goals scored; 7) Play-off if relevant for deciding champion, relegation or participating in a European league, otherwise by draw. 8) Penalty shoot-out (only after a play-off)
(C) Champions; (O) Play-off winners; (P) Promoted

=== Positions by round ===
The table lists the positions of teams after completion of each round.

Team ╲ Round	1	2	3	4	5	6	7	8	9	10	11	12	13	14	15	16	17	18	19	20	21	22	23	24	25	26	27	28	29	30	31	32	33	34	35	36	37	38
FC Emmen	12	15	12	17	19	13	9	6	3	7	4	4	4	3	4	3	3	4	3	3	3	5	2	2	2	2	2	2	2	1	1	1	1	1	1	1	1	1
FC Volendam	9	18	17	10	12	8	5	3	1	1	1	1	1	1	1	1	1	1	1	1	1	1	1	1	1	1	1	1	1	2	2	2	2	2	2	2	2	2
FC Eindhoven	7	6	10	4	11	7	11	7	10	9	8	10	6	6	6	7	7	7	8	8	8	8	8	7	5	5	6	5	4	4	4	4	4	3	3	3	3	3
ADO Den Haag	2	1	3	8	3	4	4	2	8	6	7	9	11	8	7	6	6	6	5	4	4	2	3	4	4	4	3	3	5	5	5	7	7	6	6	5	4	4
Roda JC Kerkrade	1	7	2	6	8	11	8	12	7	5	6	7	7	7	8	9	9	8	7	7	7	6	6	6	8	8	7	7	7	7	7	6	5	5	4	6	6	5
Excelsior	16	8	13	5	2	2	3	1	4	2	2	2	3	2	2	2	2	2	2	2	2	3	4	5	7	6	4	4	3	3	3	3	3	4	5	4	5	6
Jong Ajax	19	20	14	18	13	15	13	10	11	12	9	5	5	5	3	5	4	3	4	5	5	4	5	3	3	3	5	6	6	6	6	5	6	7	7	7	7	7
NAC Breda	8	11	18	12	16	16	17	18	17	18	15	13	9	12	11	12	10	9	9	9	9	9	10	10	10	9	9	9	9	8	8	9	9	8	8	8	8	8
De Graafschap	20	9	5	3	4	9	6	8	5	3	3	3	2	4	5	4	5	5	6	6	6	7	7	8	6	7	8	8	8	9	9	8	8	9	9	9	9	9
VVV-Venlo	10	13	9	15	10	6	10	9	9	8	10	11	13	15	16	15	14	11	11	12	11	11	11	11	11	11	10	10	10	10	10	10	10	10	10	10	11	10
FC Den Bosch	3	2	4	7	15	18	14	16	19	19	16	17	14	10	9	8	8	10	10	10	12	12	13	14	14	15	12	13	13	12	13	14	14	11	11	11	10	11
Jong PSV	13	16	11	16	18	14	16	17	14	15	17	15	12	13	12	13	11	13	13	11	10	10	9	9	9	10	11	11	11	11	11	11	11	12	12	12	12	12
Jong AZ	4	3	1	1	1	1	1	5	2	4	5	6	8	9	10	11	13	14	15	14	14	15	14	15	15	17	13	14	14	13	12	13	13	15	15	15	15	13
Almere City FC	15	14	19	14	9	12	15	14	16	17	19	19	18	18	18	18	18	17	18	19	19	19	20	20	20	20	19	19	18	15	15	12	12	13	14	13	13	14
TOP Oss	6	4	6	2	5	5	12	13	15	16	18	18	19	19	19	19	19	19	19	18	16	17	15	12	12	14	16	12	12	14	14	15	15	14	13	14	14	15
MVV Maastricht	5	10	7	9	6	10	7	11	13	14	13	14	16	11	13	10	12	12	12	13	13	14	16	17	17	16	17	18	19	19	18	19	18	19	18	19	18	16
FC Dordrecht	11	5	8	13	17	19	20	19	20	20	20	20	20	20	20	20	20	20	20	20	20	20	19	19	18	18	18	15	16	16	17	16	16	18	19	17	17	17
Jong FC Utrecht	17	17	16	11	7	3	2	4	6	10	11	8	10	14	14	14	15	15	14	15	15	16	17	16	16	12	14	16	17	18	19	18	19	17	17	18	16	18
Telstar	14	12	15	20	20	20	18	15	12	11	12	12	15	16	15	16	16	16	17	17	18	13	12	13	13	13	15	17	15	17	16	17	17	16	16	16	19	19
Helmond Sport	18	19	20	19	14	17	19	20	18	13	14	16	17	17	17	17	17	18	16	16	17	18	18	18	19	19	20	20	20	20	20	20	20	20	20	20	20	20

Promotion to the Eredivisie
Qualification to promotion play-offs
Reserve teams are not eligible to be promoted to the 2022–23 Eredivisie

Source: Flashscore

== Period tables ==
=== Period 1 ===
Pos	Team	Pld	W	D	L	GF	GA	GD	Pts	Qualification
1	ADO Den Haag	9	6	1	2	22	13	+9	19	Qualification to promotion play-offs
2	FC Volendam	9	5	3	1	22	13	+9	18	
3	Jong AZ	9	6	0	3	11	8	+3	18	Reserves teams cannot participate in the promotion play-offs
4	FC Emmen	9	5	1	3	15	8	+7	16	
5	Excelsior	9	5	1	3	18	12	+6	16	
6	De Graafschap	9	5	1	3	16	12	+4	16	
7	Jong FC Utrecht	9	4	3	2	14	8	+6	15	Reserves teams cannot participate in the promotion play-offs
8	Roda JC Kerkrade	9	4	2	3	17	13	+4	14	
9	VVV-Venlo	9	4	1	4	11	11	0	13	
10	FC Eindhoven	9	4	1	4	13	14	−1	13	
11	Jong Ajax	9	4	0	5	20	20	0	12	Reserves teams cannot participate in the promotion play-offs
12	Telstar	9	3	3	3	10	14	−4	12	
13	MVV Maastricht	9	4	0	5	13	26	−13	12	
14	Jong PSV	9	3	1	5	10	13	−3	10	Reserves teams cannot participate in the promotion play-offs
15	TOP Oss	9	3	1	5	11	16	−5	10	
16	Almere City FC	9	2	3	4	17	18	−1	9	
17	NAC Breda	9	2	3	4	15	17	−2	9	
18	Helmond Sport	9	3	0	6	10	15	−5	9	
19	FC Den Bosch	9	3	0	6	8	15	−7	9	
20	FC Dordrecht	9	1	3	5	9	16	−7	6	

Source: Keuken Kampioen Divisie (in Dutch)
Rules for classification: 1) points; 2) goal difference; 3) number of goals scored

=== Period 2 ===
Pos	Team	Pld	W	D	L	GF	GA	GD	Pts	Qualification
1	Excelsior	10	8	1	1	29	13	+16	25	Qualification to promotion play-offs
2	FC Volendam	10	7	3	0	25	12	+13	24	
3	Jong Ajax	10	7	3	0	24	11	+13	24	Reserves teams cannot participate in the promotion play-offs
4	ADO Den Haag	10	7	1	2	22	10	+12	22	Period 1 winner
5	FC Emmen	10	6	2	2	14	7	+7	20	
6	NAC Breda	10	5	3	2	16	6	+10	18	
7	FC Eindhoven	10	5	2	3	20	13	+7	17	
8	De Graafschap	10	5	2	3	15	11	+4	17	
9	Roda JC Kerkrade	10	4	4	2	20	14	+6	16	
10	FC Den Bosch	10	5	1	4	14	19	−5	16	
11	Jong PSV	10	3	3	4	19	19	0	12	Reserves teams cannot participate in the promotion play-offs
12	MVV Maastricht	10	3	2	5	9	13	−4	11	
13	VVV-Venlo	10	3	1	6	10	14	−4	10	
14	Helmond Sport	10	2	4	4	7	14	−7	10	
15	Almere City FC	10	2	2	6	14	22	−8	8	
16	Telstar	10	1	4	5	12	25	−13	7	
17	Jong FC Utrecht	10	2	1	7	10	23	−13	7	Reserves teams cannot participate in the promotion play-offs
18	TOP Oss	10	0	5	5	9	15	−6	5	
19	FC Dordrecht	10	1	1	8	13	32	−19	4	
20	Jong AZ	10	0	3	7	5	14	−9	3	Reserves teams cannot participate in the promotion play-offs

Source: Keuken Kampioen Divisie (in Dutch)
Rules for classification: 1) points; 2) goal difference; 3) number of goals scored

=== Period 3 ===
Pos	Team	Pld	W	D	L	GF	GA	GD	Pts	Qualification
1	FC Emmen	9	7	1	1	16	5	+11	22	Qualification to promotion play-offs
2	FC Eindhoven	9	6	3	0	18	5	+13	21	
3	FC Volendam	9	6	2	1	16	10	+6	20	
4	FC Dordrecht	9	5	3	1	19	11	+8	18	
5	ADO Den Haag	9	5	2	2	15	13	+2	17	Period 1 winner
6	Roda JC Kerkrade	9	4	4	1	17	7	+10	16	
7	VVV-Venlo	9	5	1	3	19	13	+6	16	
8	NAC Breda	9	4	3	2	14	10	+4	15	
9	TOP Oss	9	5	0	4	15	13	+2	15	
10	Jong PSV	9	4	1	4	17	12	+5	13	Reserves teams cannot participate in the promotion play-offs
11	De Graafschap	9	3	4	2	9	6	+3	13	
12	Jong Ajax	9	4	1	4	13	15	−2	13	Reserves teams cannot participate in the promotion play-offs
13	Excelsior	9	3	2	4	13	14	−1	11	Period 2 winner
14	Telstar	9	2	3	4	8	14	−6	9	
15	Jong AZ	9	2	1	6	11	17	−6	7	Reserves teams cannot participate in the promotion play-offs
16	Almere City FC	9	1	3	5	8	17	−9	6	
17	Jong FC Utrecht	9	2	0	7	6	21	−15	6	Reserves teams cannot participate in the promotion play-offs
18	FC Den Bosch	9	1	2	6	8	16	−8	5	
19	MVV Maastricht	9	1	0	8	7	19	−12	3	
20	Helmond Sport	9	1	2	6	10	21	−11	2 (Note: Helmond Sport were deducted a total of three points for failing to participate in the FC Emmen – Helmond Sport match, which was set on 14 January 2022.)	

Source: Keuken Kampioen Divisie (in Dutch)
Rules for classification: 1) points; 2) goal difference; 3) number of goals scored

=== Period 4 ===
Pos	Team	Pld	W	D	L	GF	GA	GD	Pts	Qualification
1	FC Emmen	10	8	1	1	19	4	+15	25	Period 3 winner
2	Roda JC Kerkrade	10	6	2	2	23	16	+7	20	Qualification to promotion play-offs
3	FC Eindhoven	10	6	2	2	18	11	+7	20	
4	Almere City FC	10	6	0	4	18	12	+6	18	
5	NAC Breda	10	5	2	3	15	12	+3	17	
6	FC Den Bosch	10	5	2	3	12	11	+1	17	
7	ADO Den Haag	10	4	3	3	17	17	0	15	Period 1 winner
8	Jong Ajax	10	3	5	2	25	17	+8	14	Reserves teams cannot participate in the promotion play-offs
9	Excelsior	10	3	5	2	22	18	+4	14	Period 2 winner
10	Jong AZ	10	4	2	4	12	11	+1	14	Reserves teams cannot participate in the promotion play-offs
11	MVV Maastricht	10	4	2	4	14	17	−3	14	
12	FC Volendam	10	3	4	3	18	18	0	13	
13	TOP Oss	10	3	2	5	13	18	−5	11	
14	FC Dordrecht	10	3	2	5	12	18	−6	11	
15	Jong FC Utrecht	10	3	1	6	13	15	−2	10	Reserves teams cannot participate in the promotion play-offs
16	De Graafschap	10	2	4	4	12	14	−2	10	
17	Jong PSV	10	1	6	3	15	19	−4	9	Reserves teams cannot participate in the promotion play-offs
18	VVV-Venlo	10	2	3	5	10	26	−16	9	
19	Telstar	10	2	1	7	17	21	−4	7	
20	Helmond Sport	10	2	1	7	12	22	−10	7	

Source: Keuken Kampioen Divisie (in Dutch)
Rules for classification: 1) points; 2) goal difference; 3) number of goals scored

== Results ==
=== Fixtures and results ===
Home \ Away	ADO	ALM	DBO	DOR	EIN	EMM	EXC	GRA	HEL	JAJ	JAZ	JPS	JUT	MVV	NAC	RJC	TEL	TOP	VOL	VVV
ADO Den Haag		1–0	3–2	5–1	4–2	1–2	0–2	0–0	2–1	2–0	3–2	2–2	1–1	2–3	4–1	2–0	2–1	2–0	1–1	2–0
Almere City FC	1–3		2–0	2–2	2–0	0–0	3–0	1–2	3–0	2–4	0–3	3–5	1–1	0–2	1–2	0–4	0–0	3–0	2–3	0–1
FC Den Bosch	0–1	1–0		3–0	0–2	0–2	0–5	2–1	2–0	2–3	2–1	3–2	2–1	3–1	0–5	1–0	0–1	1–0	1–2	0–0
FC Dordrecht	3–1	2–2	3–3		0–1	0–1	1–1	0–4	0–1	3–3	2–0	1–1	2–2	3–1	2–1	2–5	0–1	1–0	3–2	0–1
FC Eindhoven	1–1	3–1	1–0	5–1		1–0	4–1	1–2	3–2	1–3	1–0	1–3	4–0	1–0	2–0	1–1	1–1	2–1	2–2	4–0
FC Emmen	3–0	3–0	2–0	2–1	0–1		0–1	0–2	1–2	3–1	3–0	2–0	2–0	7–1	2–0	2–0	2–1	3–1	4–1	1–0
Excelsior	2–3	4–4	4–0	3–1	3–4	0–1		0–0	3–0	6–2	3–3	3–0	2–1	2–1	2–2	2–0	1–4	0–1	1–1	3–0
De Graafschap	1–0	1–0	0–0	2–2	0–0	1–1	3–1		0–1	1–3	0–0	1–1	2–2	1–3	2–0	0–3	1–1	1–2	0–3	1–2
Helmond Sport	0–0	1–2	1–1	1–2	1–2	1–0	1–5	0–4		3–1	1–2	1–0	0–3	1–2	4–0	0–3	2–2	1–3	1–1	0–3
Jong Ajax	6–3	1–3	2–1	1–2	2–2	1–0	1–2	1–1	1–1		2–1	2–0	3–1	3–1	6–3	2–1	3–0	4–1	4–4	6–1
Jong AZ	0–1	2–1	3–3	2–1	1–3	0–0	0–2	2–1	0–1	1–1		2–0	0–1	0–1	0–2	0–1	3–2	1–0	0–1	2–0
Jong PSV	0–1	5–1	0–1	1–1	3–2	1–3	3–0	2–3	2–0	3–1	2–0		0–2	2–2	0–0	3–3	2–3	2–2	2–2	2–1
Jong FC Utrecht	1–4	1–2	0–1	0–4	0–6	0–1	0–1	0–2	3–2	0–2	0–1	2–1		0–1	1–0	1–2	3–0	2–1	0–1	2–3
MVV Maastricht	2–6	0–3	0–1	2–1	1–0	0–1	1–1	1–3	3–2	1–0	2–3	1–2	2–4		1–2	1–1	3–0	1–1	0–1	0–5
NAC Breda	3–0	1–1	2–0	1–2	0–0	1–2	4–1	2–0	1–0	0–0	1–0	3–1	1–1	3–0		2–2	2–2	3–0	0–0	3–1
Roda JC Kerkrade	5–0	3–4	3–2	4–0	2–0	1–2	1–2	2–0	5–3	2–2	2–2	2–2	2–1	1–0	0–0		4–3	2–0	1–1	0–0
Telstar	0–2	1–1	1–2	1–0	0–1	1–1	2–5	0–3	2–2	1–0	1–0	0–0	1–3	2–1	1–4	3–4		2–2	1–5	1–3
TOP Oss	3–3	2–3	2–1	3–0	1–2	1–2	1–1	0–3	0–0	1–1	1–0	2–0	4–1	0–1	1–3	1–2	1–1		2–3	2–1
FC Volendam	1–3	3–2	3–0	4–2	2–2	2–2	5–2	3–1	4–1	3–1	2–1	3–2	2–0	5–0	1–0	2–2	2–1	1–2		2–1
VVV-Venlo	0–5	2–1	2–1	4–2	2–0	0–2	2–2	1–2	1–0	1–3	0–1	1–4	1–2	2–0	2–2	1–1	3–2	2–3	0–0	

Source: Soccerway, Keuken Kampioen Divisie (in Dutch)
Legend: Blue = home team win; Yellow = draw; Red = away team win.

=== Results by round ===
Team ╲ Round	1	2	3	4	5	6	7	8	9	10	11	12	13	14	15	16	17	18	19	20	21	22	23	24	25	26	27	28	29	30	31	32	33	34	35	36	37	38
ADO Den Haag	W	W	W	L	W	D	W	W	W	W	D	L	L	W	W	W	W	W	W	W	W	W	L	D	W	L	D	W	L	D	D	L	W	W	W	D	W	L
Almere City FC	L	D	L	W	W	D	L	D	L	L	L	L	W	L	D	L	L	W	D	L	L	L	L	D	D	D	W	L	W	W	W	W	W	L	L	W	L	L
FC Den Bosch	W	W	L	L	L	L	W	L	L	L	W	D	W	W	W	W	L	L	L	D	L	L	L	L	L	L	W	D	L	W	L	D	W	W	W	L	W	D
FC Dordrecht	D	W	D	L	L	L	L	D	L	L	L	D	L	W	L	L	L	L	L	D	W	W	W	L	D	D	W	W	L	D	L	W	L	L	L	W	W	D
FC Eindhoven	D	W	L	W	L	W	L	W	L	W	D	L	W	W	W	L	W	L	D	D	D	W	W	W	W	W	D	W	W	W	D	L	W	W	L	W	W	D
FC Emmen	D	L	W	L	L	W	W	W	W	L	W	W	W	D	D	W	W	L	W	W	W	L	W	W	W	D	W	W	W	W	W	W	D	W	W	W	L	W
Excelsior	L	W	D	W	W	W	L	W	L	W	W	W	L	W	D	W	W	W	W	D	L	D	L	L	L	W	W	W	W	W	D	W	L	L	D	D	D	D
De Graafschap	L	W	W	W	L	L	W	D	W	W	D	W	W	L	D	W	L	W	L	W	L	D	W	D	W	D	L	D	D	L	L	W	D	L	L	W	D	D
Helmond Sport	L	L	L	W	W	L	L	L	W	W	D	D	L	L	D	L	L	D	W	D	L	W	L	L	L	D	L	L	L	L	W	L	L	L	L	L	W	D
Jong Ajax	L	L	W	L	W	L	W	W	L	D	W	W	W	W	W	D	W	W	D	D	W	W	L	W	W	L	L	L	W	D	D	W	D	D	L	W	L	D
Jong AZ	W	W	W	W	W	L	L	L	W	D	L	L	L	L	D	D	L	L	L	D	L	L	W	L	L	L	W	L	D	W	W	L	W	L	L	D	L	W
Jong PSV	D	L	W	L	L	W	L	L	W	L	D	W	W	D	D	L	W	L	L	D	W	W	W	L	W	L	L	L	L	D	D	D	L	L	W	D	D	D
Jong FC Utrecht	L	D	D	W	W	W	W	D	L	L	L	W	L	L	L	D	L	L	W	L	L	L	L	W	L	W	L	L	L	L	L	W	L	W	L	D	W	L
MVV Maastricht	W	L	W	L	W	L	W	L	L	L	W	L	D	W	L	W	L	D	L	L	L	L	L	L	L	W	L	L	L	L	W	L	W	L	D	D	W	W
NAC Breda	D	D	L	W	L	D	L	L	W	L	W	W	W	L	D	D	W	W	D	L	D	D	L	W	D	W	W	W	W	W	L	L	D	W	W	L	W	D
Roda JC Kerkrade	W	L	W	L	D	D	W	L	W	W	D	L	D	W	L	D	D	W	W	D	W	W	W	D	D	D	W	L	W	W	D	W	W	D	W	L	L	W
Telstar	D	D	L	L	L	D	W	W	W	W	L	D	L	L	D	L	D	L	D	D	L	W	W	D	L	D	L	L	D	L	W	L	L	W	L	L	L	L
TOP Oss	W	W	L	W	L	D	L	L	L	L	L	L	L	D	D	L	D	D	D	W	W	L	W	W	L	L	L	W	D	L	D	L	W	W	W	L	L	L
FC Volendam	D	L	D	W	D	W	W	W	W	W	W	W	W	D	W	D	W	D	W	W	W	D	W	D	W	W	L	W	D	L	D	D	L	W	W	W	L	D
VVV-Venlo	D	L	W	L	W	W	L	W	L	W	L	L	L	L	L	W	D	W	L	L	W	L	L	W	W	D	W	W	D	L	L	D	L	L	W	L	D	W

Source: Flashscore

== Promotion/relegation play-offs ==
The seeds are assigned based on the final ranking after the regular season. The best ranked team will get the highest seed (lowest number). Eredivisie teams are considered to be better ranked than eerste divisie teams.

In the second leg, if a match is leveled at the end of the normal playing time, extra time will be played (two periods of 15 minutes each) and followed, if necessary, by a penalty shoot-out to determine the winners.

Seven teams, six from the Eerste Divisie and one from the Eredivisie, will play for a spot in the 2022–23 Eredivisie. The remaining six teams will play in the 2022–23 Eerste Divisie. The highest seeded team or the team from the Eredivisie will always host the second leg.

=== Qualified teams ===
Team	Rank	seed
Heracles Almelo	16	1
FC Eindhoven	3	2
ADO Den Haag	4	3
Roda JC Kerkrade	5	4
Excelsior	6	5
NAC Breda	8	6
De Graafschap	9	7

=== Bracket ===
First round
4	Roda JC Kerkrade	2	0	2
5	Excelsior	2	2	4
2	FC Eindhoven	1	3	4
7	De Graafschap	1	1	2
3	ADO Den Haag	2	2	4
6	NAC Breda	1	1	2

Semifinals
5	Excelsior	3	3	6
1	Heracles Almelo	0	1	1
2	FC Eindhoven	1	1	2
3	ADO Den Haag	2	2	4

Final
5	Excelsior (p)	1	4	5 (8)
3	ADO Den Haag	1	4	5 (7)

=== First round ===
==== First legs ====
9 May 2022	De Graafschap	1–1	FC Eindhoven	De Vijverberg, Doetinchem
20:00 CEST	Gravenberch 73' (pen.)	Report	Sleegers 12' (pen.)	Attendance: 10,022; Referee: Alex Bos

10 May 2022	NAC Breda	1–2	ADO Den Haag	Rat Verlegh Stadion, Breda
18:45 CEST	Maria 74'	Report	Steijn 34'; Komljenovic 90+3'	Attendance: 16,728; Referee: Edwin van de Graaf

10 May 2022	Excelsior	2–2	Roda JC Kerkrade	Van Donge & De Roo Stadion, Rotterdam
21:00 CEST	Goudmijn 9'; Dallinga 42' (pen.)	Report	Vente 67'; Marzo 68'	Attendance: 3,178; Referee: Rob Dieperink

==== Second legs ====
13 May 2022	FC Eindhoven	3–1 (4–2 agg.)	De Graafschap	Jan Louwers Stadion, Eindhoven
20:00 CEST	Ogenia 10'; Brym 22'; Sleegers 24'	Report	Kaandorp 16'	Attendance: 4,200; Referee: Jannick van der Laan

14 May 2022	ADO Den Haag	2–1 (4–2 agg.)	NAC Breda	Cars Jeans Stadion, Den Haag
16:30 CEST	Malone 76' (o.g.); Moreo Klas 79'	Report	Banzuzi 90+3'	Attendance: 10,379; Referee: Allard Lindhout

14 May 2022	Roda JC Kerkrade	0–2 (a.e.t.) (2–4 agg.)	Excelsior	Parkstad Limburg Stadion, Kerkrade
20:00 CEST		Report	Driouech 95'; Agrafiotis 120+3'	Attendance: 14,763; Referee: Jochem Kamphuis

=== Semifinals ===
==== First legs ====
17 May 2022	ADO Den Haag	2–1	FC Eindhoven	Cars Jeans Stadion, Den Haag
20:00 CEST	Moreo Klas 15'; Verheydt 28'	Report	Sleegers 74' (pen.)	Attendance: 10,475; Referee: Jochem Kamphuis

18 May 2022	Excelsior	3–0	Heracles Almelo	Van Donge & De Roo Stadion, Rotterdam
18:45 CEST	Azarkan 21'; Dallinga 74'; Driouech 85'	Report		Attendance: 4,400; Referee: Martin van den Kerkhof

==== Second legs ====
21 May 2022	FC Eindhoven	1–2 (2–4 agg.)	ADO Den Haag	Jan Louwers Stadion, Eindhoven
16:30 CEST	Amevor 89'	Report	Verheydt 16'; Seedorf 26' (o.g.)	Attendance: 4,200; Referee: Bas Nijhuis

21 May 2022	Heracles Almelo	1–3 (1–6 agg.)	Excelsior	Erve Asito, Almelo
20:00 CEST	Bakış 28'	Report	Dallinga 47'; Wieffer 63'; Agrafiotis 83'	Attendance: 6,924; Referee: Edwin van de Graaf

=== Final ===
==== First leg ====
24 May 2022	Excelsior	1–1	ADO Den Haag	Van Donge & De Roo Stadion, Rotterdam
20:00 CEST	Azarkan 47'	Report	Steijn 90+2'	Attendance: 4,400; Referee: Dennis Higler

==== Second leg ====
29 May 2022	ADO Den Haag	4–4 (a.e.t.) (5–5 agg.) (7–8 p)	Excelsior	Cars Jeans Stadion, Den Haag
18:00 CEST	Verheydt 35'; Pires 40'; Steijn 47'; Komljenovic 97'	Report	Azarkan 79'; Niemeijer 83'; Dallinga 90+3'; El Yaakoubi 109'	Attendance: 15,000; Referee: Danny Makkelie
	Penalties
	Kemper (penalty scored); Matthys (penalty scored); Moreo Klas (penalty missed); Asante (penalty scored); Komljenovic (penalty scored); Puclin (penalty scored); Ćatić (penalty scored); Esajas (penalty scored); Amofa (penalty missed)		(penalty scored) El Yaakoubi; (penalty scored) Baas; (penalty missed) Eyongo; (penalty scored) Nieuwpoort; (penalty scored) Driouech; (penalty scored) Ormonde-Ottewill; (penalty scored) Admiraal; (penalty scored) Wieffer; (penalty scored) Horemans

== Statistics ==
=== Top scorers ===
As of 6 May 2022

Rank	Player	Club	Goals
1	(Netherlands) Thijs Dallinga	Excelsior	32
2	(Netherlands) Thomas Verheydt	ADO Den Haag	30
3	(Netherlands) Robert Mühren	FC Volendam	29
4	(Suriname) Dylan Vente	Roda JC Kerkrade	23
5	(Netherlands) Joey Sleegers	FC Eindhoven	21
6	(Netherlands) Reuven Niemeijer	Excelsior	17
6	(Belgium) Johan Bakayoko	Jong PSV	17
8	(Netherlands) Naci Ünüvar	Jong Ajax	16
9	(Germany) Rui Mendes	FC Emmen	15
9	(Netherlands) Sem Steijn	ADO Den Haag	15
9	(Netherlands) Nick Venema	VVV-Venlo	15

=== Top assists ===
As of 6 May 2022

Rank	Player	Club	Assists
1	(Netherlands) Daryl van Mieghem	FC Volendam	14
2	(Netherlands) Naci Ünüvar	Jong Ajax	12
2	(Germany) Patrick Pflücke	Roda JC Kerkrade	12
4	(Bosnia and Herzegovina) Amar Ćatić	ADO Den Haag	11
4	(Netherlands) Joey Sleegers	FC Eindhoven	11
4	(Netherlands) Lance Duijvestijn	Almere City FC	11
4	(Netherlands) Robert Mühren	FC Volendam	11
4	(Netherlands) Reuven Niemeijer	Excelsior	11
9	(Belgium) Johan Bakayoko	Jong PSV	10
10	(Netherlands) Ralf Seuntjens	NAC Breda	9

=== Clean sheets ===
As of 6 May 2022

Rank	Player	Club	Clean sheets
1	(Netherlands) Michael Brouwer	FC Emmen	17
2	(Netherlands) Nigel Bertrams	FC Eindhoven	14
2	(Netherlands) Hidde Jurjus	De Graafschap	14
2	(Netherlands) Nick Olij	NAC Breda	14
4	(Netherlands) Rody de Boer	Roda JC Kerkrade	12
5	(Netherlands) Stijn van Gassel	Excelsior	10
5	(Netherlands) Wouter van der Steen	FC Den Bosch	10
7	(Netherlands) Mike Havekotte	Helmond Sport	8
8	(Netherlands) Delano van Crooij	VVV-Venlo	7
8	(Netherlands) Luuk Koopmans	ADO Den Haag	7
8	(Serbia) Filip Stanković	FC Volendam	7

=== Discipline ===
As of 6 May 2022

==== Player ====
- Most yellow cards: 9
  - (Japan) Yuya Ikeshita (Jong FC Utrecht)
  - (Italy) Alessio Miceli (FC Dordrecht)
  - (Germany) Brian Koglin (VVV-Venlo)
- Most red cards: 1
  - 20 players

==== Club ====
- Most yellow cards: 87
  - FC Dordrecht
- Most red cards: 4
  - Jong PSV
