= 2018–19 Eerste Divisie =

63rd season of the second-tier football league in Netherlands

Eerste Divisie
- Season: 2018–19
- Champions: Twente
- Promoted: Twente; RKC Waalwijk; Sparta Rotterdam
- Relegated: No relegation
- Matches: 380
- Goals: 1,179 (3.1 per match)
- Top goalscorer: Ferdy Druijf (29)
- Biggest home win: Jong Ajax 8–0 Almere City (3 May 2019)
- Biggest away win: Jong Ajax 0–6 Cambuur (1 April 2019)
- Highest scoring: Eindhoven 8–1 Dordrecht (22 March 2019)
- Longest winning run: 10 matches Twente
- Longest unbeaten run: 15 matches Den Bosch; Twente
- Longest winless run: 17 matches Jong Utrecht
- Longest losing run: 11 matches Jong Utrecht
- Highest attendance: 30,000
- Lowest attendance: 183
- Total attendance: 1,803,317
- Average attendance: 4,746

The 2018–19 Eerste Divisie, known as Keuken Kampioen Divisie for sponsorship reasons, was the sixty-third season of Eerste Divisie since its establishment in 1955. It began in August 2018 and ended in May 2019 with the returns of the finals of the promotion/relegation play-offs, involving also the 16th- and 17th-placed teams from the 2018–19 Eredivisie.

== Teams ==
A total of 20 teams are taking part in the league. Fortuna Sittard gained promotion to the Eredivisie, and was replaced by FC Twente, who finished bottom in the 2017–18 Eredivisie. FC Emmen and De Graafschap won the post-season playoff, and are replaced in the 2018–19 Eerste Divisie by Roda JC and Sparta Rotterdam.

At an extraordinary KNVB federation meeting on June 7, 2018, representatives of amateur and professional football reached an agreement to renew the football pyramid in the 2019–20 season. Part of the Agreement was that no promotion/relegation would take place between the Eerste and Tweede Divisie this season.

Location of teams in the Eerste Divisie 2018–19

Club	Location	Venue	Capacity
Almere City	Almere	Yanmar Stadion	3,000
Cambuur	Leeuwarden	Cambuur Stadion	10,250
Den Bosch	's-Hertogenbosch	De Vliert	8,713
Dordrecht	Dordrecht	Riwal Hoogwerkers Stadion	4,235
Eindhoven	Eindhoven	Jan Louwers Stadion	4,600
Go Ahead Eagles	Deventer	De Adelaarshorst	10,000
Helmond Sport	Helmond	Lavans Stadion	4,174
Jong Ajax	Amsterdam	Sportpark De Toekomst; Johan Cruyff Arena	2,050; 53,502
Jong AZ	Alkmaar	AFAS Trainingscomplex; AFAS Stadion	200; 17,023
Jong PSV	Eindhoven	De Herdgang; Philips Stadion	2,500; 36,500
Jong Utrecht	Utrecht	Sportpark De Westmaat; Stadion Galgenwaard	8,000; 23,750
MVV	Maastricht	De Geusselt	8,800
NEC	Nijmegen	Stadion de Goffert	12,500
RKC Waalwijk	Waalwijk	Mandemakers Stadion	7,508
Roda JC Kerkrade	Kerkrade	Parkstad Limburg Stadion	19,979
Sparta Rotterdam	Rotterdam	Het Kasteel	11,026
Telstar	Velsen	Rabobank IJmond Stadion	3,060
TOP Oss	Oss	Frans Heesenstadion	4,560
Twente	Enschede	De Grolsch Veste	30,205
Volendam	Volendam	Kras Stadion	7,384

=== Personnel and kits ===
Club	Manager	Kit manufacturer	Sponsors
Almere City	(Italy) (Netherlands) Michele Santoni	Adidas	Main Energie
Cambuur	(Netherlands) René Hake	Quick	Bouwgroep Dijkstra Draisma
Den Bosch	(Netherlands) Wil Boessen	Masita	Van der Ven
Dordrecht	(Netherlands) Gérard de Nooijer	Jartazi	Riwal Hoogwerkers
Eindhoven	(Portugal) David Nascimento	Joma	VDL Groep
Go Ahead Eagles	(Netherlands) John Stegeman	Hummel	Thermen Bussloo
Helmond Sport	(Netherlands) Rob Alflen	Saller	Vescom
Jong Ajax	(Netherlands) Michael Reiziger	Adidas	Ziggo
Jong AZ	(Netherlands) Koen Stam (Netherlands) Michel Vonk	Under Armour	AFAS Software
Jong PSV	(Netherlands) Dennis Haar	Umbro	energiedirect.nl
Jong Utrecht	(Netherlands) Robin Pronk	Hummel	Zorg van de Zaak
MVV	(Netherlands) Ron Elsen	Masita	Open Line
NEC	(Netherlands) Jack de Gier	Legea	EnergieFlex
RKC Waalwijk	(Netherlands) Fred Grim	Stanno	Mandemakers Keukens
Roda JC Kerkrade	(Netherlands) Robert Molenaar	Masita	MASCOT Workwear
Sparta Rotterdam	(Netherlands) Henk Fraser	Robey	Centric
Telstar	(Netherlands) Mike Snoei	Kelme	pay2d
TOP Oss	(Netherlands) Klaas Wels	Erima	Martin Glas
FC Twente	(Bosnia and Herzegovina) (Netherlands) Marino Pušić (caretaker)	Sondico	Pure Energie
Volendam	(Netherlands) Misha Salden	Jako	HSB

== Standings ==
Pos	Team	Pld	W	D	L	GF	GA	GD	Pts	Promotion or qualification
1	Twente (Note: Twente were deducted 1 point and winner of the Third Period (games 21–29).) (C, P)	38	25	5	8	72	39	+33	79	Promotion to the Eredivisie
2	Sparta Rotterdam (Note: Winner of the First Period (games 3–11).) (O, P)	38	19	12	7	78	47	+31	69	Qualification to promotion play-offs second round
3	Jong PSV (Note: Reserves teams aren't eligible to be promoted to the Eredivisie)	38	18	9	11	77	59	+18	63	
4	Den Bosch (Note: Winner of the Second Period (games 12–20).)	38	18	9	11	64	49	+15	63	Qualification to promotion play-offs second round
5	Go Ahead Eagles	38	19	6	13	63	57	+6	63	Qualification to promotion play-offs second round
6	TOP Oss	38	18	8	12	48	40	+8	62	Qualification to promotion play-offs second round
7	Almere City (Note: Winner of the Fourth Period (games 30–38).)	38	19	5	14	60	63	−3	62	Qualification to promotion play-offs first round
8	RKC Waalwijk (O, P)	38	18	5	15	69	57	+12	59	Qualification to promotion play-offs first round
9	NEC	38	16	10	12	73	60	+13	58	Qualification to promotion play-offs first round
10	Cambuur	38	16	10	12	61	48	+13	58	Qualification to promotion play-offs first round
11	Jong Ajax	38	16	8	14	81	67	+14	56	
12	MVV	38	14	12	12	49	53	−4	54	
13	Roda JC Kerkrade	38	14	11	13	57	59	−2	53	
14	Eindhoven	38	13	9	16	52	48	+4	48	
15	Telstar	38	14	6	18	45	58	−13	48	
16	Volendam	38	9	14	15	46	62	−16	41	
17	Dordrecht	38	9	9	20	54	84	−30	36	
18	Jong AZ	38	7	12	19	46	67	−21	33	
19	Jong Utrecht	38	5	8	25	47	90	−43	23	
20	Helmond Sport	38	4	10	24	37	72	−35	22	

Source: Soccerway, Keuken Kampioen Divisie (in Dutch)
Rules for classification: Season in progress: 1) Most points won; 2) Less points lost; 3) Goal difference; 4) Goals scored; 5) Alphabetical order. End of season: 1) Points; 2) Goal difference; 3) Goals scored; 4) Head-to-head points; 5) Head-to-head goal difference; 6) Head-to-head away goals scored; 7) Play-off if relevant for deciding champion, relegation, international competitions and play-offs qualification, otherwise by draw. 8) Penalty shoot-out (only after a play-off)
(C) Champions; (O) Play-off winners; (P) Promoted

== Period tables ==
=== Period 1 ===
Pos	Team	Pld	W	D	L	GF	GA	GD	Pts	Qualification
1	Sparta Rotterdam	9	6	3	0	17	7	+10	21	Qualification to promotion play-offs
2	Go Ahead Eagles	9	6	2	1	18	8	+10	20	
3	Twente	9	6	1	2	19	8	+11	19	
4	Den Bosch	9	6	1	2	15	9	+6	19	
5	Almere City	9	5	2	2	16	9	+7	17	
6	NEC	9	4	2	3	16	16	0	14	
7	Jong PSV	9	3	4	2	18	17	+1	13	Reserves teams cannot participate in the promotion play-offs
8	Jong Ajax	9	4	1	4	12	12	0	13	Reserves teams cannot participate in the promotion play-offs
9	Cambuur	9	4	1	4	11	11	0	13	
10	MVV	9	3	4	2	10	11	−1	13	
11	TOP Oss	9	3	3	3	10	8	+2	12	
12	Telstar	9	4	0	5	12	16	−4	12	
13	Volendam	9	2	5	2	10	11	−1	11	
14	Jong AZ	9	1	6	2	13	15	−2	9	Reserves teams cannot participate in the promotion play-offs
15	Eindhoven	9	2	3	4	7	10	−3	9	
16	Roda JC Kerkrade	9	2	3	4	9	14	−5	9	
17	Jong Utrecht	9	1	3	5	10	20	−10	6	Reserves teams cannot participate in the promotion play-offs
18	RKC Waalwijk	9	1	2	6	7	13	−6	5	
19	Dordrecht	9	1	2	6	10	17	−7	5	
20	Helmond Sport	9	0	4	5	10	18	−8	4	

Source: Keuken Kampioen Divisie (in Dutch)
Rules for classification: 1) points; 2) goal difference; 3) number of goals scored

=== Period 2 ===
Pos	Team	Pld	W	D	L	GF	GA	GD	Pts	Qualification
1	Den Bosch	9	6	3	0	20	8	+12	21	Qualification to promotion play-offs
2	Roda JC Kerkrade	9	6	1	2	20	9	+11	19	
3	Twente	9	6	0	3	15	11	+4	18	
4	Jong PSV	9	5	2	2	25	14	+11	17	Reserves teams cannot participate in the promotion play-offs
5	Jong Ajax	9	5	1	3	21	13	+8	16	Reserves teams cannot participate in the promotion play-offs
6	Eindhoven	9	5	1	3	15	12	+3	16	
7	Volendam	9	5	1	3	14	13	+1	16	
8	TOP Oss	9	5	1	3	11	10	+1	16	
9	Sparta Rotterdam	9	4	3	2	21	12	+9	15	Period 1 winner
10	RKC Waalwijk	9	5	0	4	16	16	0	15	
11	Go Ahead Eagles	9	4	1	4	10	13	−3	13	
12	Cambuur	9	3	3	3	13	14	−1	12	
13	Telstar	9	3	2	4	11	16	−5	11	
14	MVV	9	3	1	5	9	13	−4	10	
15	Helmond Sport	9	2	2	5	9	12	−3	8	
16	Jong Utrecht	9	2	2	5	13	18	−5	8	Reserves teams cannot participate in the promotion play-offs
17	Almere City	9	2	2	5	11	22	−11	8	
18	NEC	9	2	1	6	13	17	−4	7	
19	Dordrecht	9	1	2	6	10	21	−11	5	
20	Jong AZ	9	1	1	7	9	22	−13	4	Reserves teams cannot participate in the promotion play-offs

Source: Keuken Kampioen Divisie (in Dutch)
Rules for classification: 1) points; 2) goal difference; 3) number of goals scored

=== Period 3 ===
Pos	Team	Pld	W	D	L	GF	GA	GD	Pts	Qualification
1	Twente	9	8	1	0	22	3	+19	25	Qualification to promotion play-offs
2	NEC	9	4	5	0	24	10	+14	17	
3	Jong PSV	9	5	2	2	18	13	+5	17	Reserves teams cannot participate in the promotion play-offs
4	MVV	9	5	2	2	18	13	+5	17	
5	Sparta Rotterdam	9	4	4	1	20	12	+8	16	Period 1 winner
6	RKC Waalwijk	9	5	1	3	19	12	+7	16	
7	Go Ahead Eagles	9	4	3	2	16	16	0	15	
8	Eindhoven	9	4	2	3	11	8	+3	14	
9	Dordrecht	9	4	2	3	16	17	−1	14	
10	Almere City	9	4	1	4	11	15	−4	13	
11	Cambuur	9	3	3	3	10	9	+1	12	
12	Telstar	9	3	2	4	5	10	−5	11	
13	TOP Oss	9	3	2	4	8	14	−6	11	
14	Jong Ajax	9	2	4	3	17	17	0	10	Reserves teams cannot participate in the promotion play-offs
15	Volendam	9	2	4	3	12	17	−5	10	
16	Roda JC Kerkrade	9	2	3	4	16	18	−2	9	
17	Den Bosch	9	2	3	4	11	14	−3	9	Period 2 winner
18	Jong AZ	9	2	3	4	9	14	−5	9	Reserves teams cannot participate in the promotion play-offs
19	Helmond Sport	9	0	1	8	4	20	−16	1	
20	Jong Utrecht	9	0	0	9	9	24	−15	0	Reserves teams cannot participate in the promotion play-offs

Source: Keuken Kampioen Divisie (in Dutch)
Rules for classification: 1) points; 2) goal difference; 3) number of goals scored

=== Period 4 ===
Pos	Team	Pld	W	D	L	GF	GA	GD	Pts	Qualification
1	Almere City	9	7	0	2	18	13	+5	21	Qualification to promotion play-offs
2	Cambuur	9	5	2	2	23	11	+12	17	
3	RKC Waalwijk	9	5	2	2	23	14	+9	17	
4	TOP Oss	9	5	2	2	13	7	+6	17	
5	NEC	9	5	1	3	16	14	+2	16	
6	Jong Ajax	9	4	2	3	25	21	+4	14	Reserves teams cannot participate in the promotion play-offs
7	Sparta Rotterdam	9	4	2	3	17	14	+3	14	Period 1 winner
8	Telstar	9	4	2	3	17	14	+3	14	
9	Twente	9	4	2	3	12	14	−2	14	Period 3 winner
10	Jong PSV	9	4	1	4	13	10	+3	13	Reserves teams cannot participate in the promotion play-offs
11	Jong AZ	9	3	2	4	12	11	+1	11	Reserves teams cannot participate in the promotion play-offs
12	Den Bosch	9	3	2	4	14	14	0	11	Period 2 winner
13	MVV	9	2	5	2	11	14	−3	11	
14	Dordrecht	9	3	2	4	16	24	−8	11	
15	Roda JC Kerkrade	9	2	4	3	8	16	−8	10	
16	Eindhoven	9	2	3	4	17	14	+3	9	
17	Jong Utrecht	9	2	3	4	14	21	−7	9	Reserves teams cannot participate in the promotion play-offs
18	Go Ahead Eagles	9	3	0	6	12	19	−7	9	
19	Helmond Sport	9	2	1	6	12	20	−8	7	
20	Volendam	9	0	4	5	9	17	−8	4	

Source: Keuken Kampioen Divisie (in Dutch)
Rules for classification: 1) points; 2) goal difference; 3) number of goals scored

== Results ==
Home \ Away	ALM	CAM	DBO	DOR	EIN	GAE	HEL	JAJ	JAZ	JPS	JUT	MVV	NEC	RKC	RJC	SPA	TEL	TOP	TWE	VOL
Almere City		2–1	3–1	1–1	2–0	0–1	3–0	2–3	2–0	2–1	3–1	2–2	1–0	2–1	1–2	1–3	2–0	3–0	1–3	0–2
Cambuur	0–1		2–0	1–3	1–3	1–1	3–1	2–1	2–1	3–1	4–1	4–1	1–1	2–0	0–1	3–3	2–0	0–0	0–1	1–1
Den Bosch	1–4	1–1		1–0	3–1	2–0	3–0	1–1	3–1	3–1	2–2	1–2	3–2	2–3	2–0	1–1	3–4	3–0	2–1	1–1
Dordrecht	3–2	3–1	2–6		0–3	1–3	0–0	3–3	1–1	1–3	1–2	1–1	2–2	2–0	3–2	1–4	1–4	0–1	0–2	1–2
Eindhoven	0–2	2–2	2–0	8–1		1–2	2–1	1–1	0–1	1–2	0–0	0–1	3–2	1–3	1–2	0–0	1–2	2–1	1–1	1–1
Go Ahead Eagles	2–1	2–0	0–0	2–1	0–1		1–0	2–1	1–0	2–1	5–0	2–0	4–4	1–4	3–0	2–2	2–3	0–1	1–2	3–0
Helmond Sport	1–2	0–1	0–2	1–2	2–1	1–1		1–3	1–3	0–2	2–0	1–1	2–3	0–2	4–0	3–0	1–2	0–4	2–2	2–2
Jong Ajax	8–0	0–6	2–2	5–2	0–3	5–2	2–0		1–1	2–2	3–3	0–1	4–0	2–1	5–1	2–0	3–0	1–0	2–5	1–3
Jong AZ	2–3	2–1	0–0	0–1	1–2	3–2	2–2	0–1		0–0	2–2	2–3	4–0	2–4	1–1	3–2	0–2	1–3	1–2	1–1
Jong PSV	5–2	1–2	0–1	2–2	2–1	5–1	1–1	2–1	3–1		3–1	2–2	1–2	2–1	2–2	2–0	2–0	3–1	0–2	1–0
Jong Utrecht	0–2	0–0	1–1	4–1	1–3	2–4	1–1	4–3	1–3	3–2		0–0	1–2	1–2	1–2	1–5	0–1	1–2	1–6	3–1
MVV	1–1	1–2	0–3	2–1	1–1	1–2	3–0	1–0	1–1	2–2	4–2		1–1	1–4	2–0	0–2	2–0	0–2	0–2	1–1
NEC	5–0	2–2	5–0	1–0	0–1	1–1	3–2	1–2	3–1	4–4	4–1	0–1		2–1	1–0	1–1	1–1	1–5	4–0	5–1
RKC Waalwijk	0–1	0–2	2–1	4–4	3–1	1–3	2–1	4–1	2–2	3–5	3–2	3–1	1–0		0–1	0–1	1–0	0–0	4–1	3–3
Roda JC Kerkrade	1–2	1–0	0–2	2–2	0–0	3–1	3–0	2–1	6–2	2–3	2–1	2–2	2–3	0–0		1–1	3–0	1–1	1–1	2–1
Sparta Rotterdam	6–1	3–0	2–0	3–2	2–0	6–1	3–1	2–2	5–0	0–0	4–2	2–0	1–0	2–1	2–2		3–2	1–4	0–3	2–0
Telstar	1–1	4–2	1–4	1–0	1–1	2–1	1–1	0–2	1–0	2–4	2–0	0–1	0–3	0–3	4–0	1–1		1–0	1–3	1–1
TOP Oss	2–0	1–3	0–1	1–0	2–0	1–0	1–1	2–1	1–0	4–1	2–1	1–3	1–1	1–2	0–5	0–0	1–0		0–2	0–0
Twente	1–0	2–2	1–0	0–1	1–0	0–1	4–1	2–5	0–0	2–1	1–0	0–1	2–0	3–1	3–1	2–1	1–0	1–2		5–0
Volendam	2–2	0–1	1–2	3–4	1–3	0–1	1–0	3–1	1–1	0–3	2–0	3–2	2–3	1–0	1–1	2–2	1–0	0–0	1–2	

Source: Soccerway, Keuken Kampioen Divisie (in Dutch)
Legend: Blue = home team win; Yellow = draw; Red = away team win.

== Positions by round ==
The table lists the positions of teams after completion of each round.

Team ╲ Round	1	2	3	4	5	6	7	8	9	10	11	12	13	14	15	16	17	18	19	20	21	22	23	24	25	26	27	28	29	30	31	32	33	34	35	36	37	38
Twente	5	5	2	8	7	5	3	3	4	3	3	3	4	5	5	5	4	4	4	2	2	1	1	1	1	1	1	1	1	1	1	1	1	1	1	1	1	1
Sparta Rotterdam	17	9	7	5	3	6	4	4	2	2	2	1	1	2	2	3	2	1	3	3	4	4	4	5	4	2	2	3	2	2	2	2	2	2	2	2	2	2
Jong PSV	6	13	12	14	14	11	13	11	9	10	10	11	11	7	8	8	8	7	6	7	6	6	5	4	5	5	5	5	5	5	4	5	5	4	5	4	5	3
Den Bosch	4	11	11	9	10	13	11	9	5	5	4	4	3	3	3	1	1	2	1	1	1	2	2	2	2	3	4	4	4	4	5	4	4	5	6	6	6	4
Go Ahead Eagles	1	1	1	1	2	1	1	2	1	1	1	2	2	1	1	2	3	3	2	4	3	3	3	3	3	4	3	2	3	3	3	3	3	3	3	3	3	5
TOP Oss	2	2	5	4	8	7	8	7	6	9	6	6	6	4	4	4	5	6	5	6	7	7	7	10	9	8	7	9	6	7	6	8	9	9	8	7	7	6
Almere City	3	10	6	7	6	4	2	1	3	4	5	5	5	6	6	6	7	9	10	10	12	14	14	13	11	11	10	10	13	11	7	6	6	6	4	5	4	7
RKC Waalwijk	8	3	8	12	13	12	14	14	15	16	15	15	15	15	15	16	15	13	14	12	10	10	8	7	8	10	11	12	11	6	9	7	8	8	7	10	10	8
NEC	9	6	4	3	4	3	5	5	7	6	7	7	8	8	10	9	10	11	12	15	15	15	15	15	15	13	13	11	9	13	14	14	14	12	11	9	8	9
Cambuur	10	7	3	2	1	2	6	6	8	7	8	8	9	9	9	12	11	12	9	9	9	8	11	12	14	15	15	13	12	9	12	9	12	11	12	8	9	10
Jong Ajax	16	8	10	6	5	8	10	8	11	8	9	10	10	11	13	11	9	8	7	8	8	9	10	8	10	9	9	8	10	12	8	12	7	7	9	12	11	11
MVV	19	12	15	13	11	10	9	12	10	11	11	12	14	12	11	10	12	10	11	13	14	13	12	9	7	7	8	7	8	10	10	13	13	14	13	11	12	12
Roda JC Kerkrade	7	4	9	11	9	9	7	10	12	12	12	9	7	10	7	7	6	5	8	5	5	5	6	6	6	6	6	6	7	8	11	10	10	10	10	13	13	13
Eindhoven	14	17	19	20	20	19	17	17	14	14	17	17	17	16	16	15	16	16	15	14	11	11	9	11	12	14	14	15	14	14	13	11	11	13	14	14	14	14
Telstar	18	18	14	10	12	14	12	13	13	13	13	13	12	14	14	14	13	14	16	16	16	16	16	16	16	16	16	16	16	16	16	15	15	15	15	15	15	15
Volendam	15	19	17	18	18	18	19	16	17	17	14	14	13	13	12	13	14	15	13	11	13	12	13	14	13	12	12	14	15	15	15	16	16	16	16	16	16	16
Dordrecht	11	15	18	19	19	20	20	20	20	20	19	19	18	20	19	18	17	18	19	20	18	18	18	17	17	17	17	18	17	17	17	17	17	17	17	17	17	17
Jong AZ	13	16	16	17	15	15	15	15	16	15	16	16	16	17	17	17	19	20	20	19	20	20	17	18	18	18	18	17	18	18	18	18	18	18	18	18	18	18
Jong Utrecht	20	20	20	16	17	16	16	19	18	18	20	20	20	18	18	19	18	17	17	18	19	19	20	20	20	20	20	20	20	20	20	20	20	20	20	20	20	19
Helmond Sport	12	14	13	15	16	17	18	18	19	19	18	18	19	19	20	20	20	19	18	17	17	17	19	19	19	19	19	19	19	19	19	19	19	19	19	19	19	20

Promotion to the Eredivisie
Qualification to promotion play-offs Second round
Qualification to promotion play-offs First round
Reserves teams aren't eligible to be promoted to the Eredivisie

Updated to match(es) played on 3 May 2019. Source: worldfootball.net

== Season statistics ==
=== Top scorers ===
Rank	Player	Club	Games	Goal	Penalty scored	avg.
1.	(Netherlands) Ferdy Druijf	NEC and Jong AZ	34	29	11	0.85
2.	(Germany) Mario Engels	Roda JC Kerkrade	34	24	6	0.71
2.	(South Africa) Lars Veldwijk	Sparta Rotterdam	36	24	2	0.67
4.	(Netherlands) Huseyin Dogan	TOP Oss	36	21	2	0.58
5.	(Brazil) Danilo	Jong Ajax	33	19	3	0.58
6.	(Netherlands) Nick Venema	Jong Utrecht	23	16	1	0.7
6.	(Netherlands) Tom Boere	Twente	31	16	8	0.52
8.	(Netherlands) Anthony van den Hurk	MVV	36	15	0	0.42
8.	(Germany) Jonathan Okita	NEC	37	15	0	0.41
10.	(Italy) Stefano Beltrame	Den Bosch	37	14	2	0.38

Updated to match(es) played on 3 May 2019.
Source: nos.nl

=== Hat-tricks(+) ===
Rnd	Player	Club	Goals	Date	Home	Score	Away
3	(Switzerland) Karim Rossi	Cambuur	47' 86' 90+2'	31 August 2018	TOP Oss	1–3	Cambuur
13	(South Africa) Lars Veldwijk	Sparta Rotterdam	31' (pen.) 34' 64'	9 November 2018	Sparta Rotterdam	4–2	Jong Utrecht
14	(Netherlands) Nick Venema	Jong Utrecht	8' 13' 48'	20 November 2018	Jong Utrecht	4–3	Jong Ajax
16	(Netherlands) Cody Gakpo	Jong PSV	19' 53' 83'	3 December 2018	Jong PSV	5–1	Go Ahead Eagles
17	(South Africa) Lars Veldwijk	Sparta Rotterdam	38' 62' 88'	7 December 2018	Sparta Rotterdam	6–1	Almere City
18	(Netherlands) Mohamed Rayhi	Sparta Rotterdam	12' 39' 89' (pen.)	14 December 2018	Sparta Rotterdam	5–0	Jong AZ
19	(Netherlands) Joël Piroe	Jong PSV	26' 45' 46' 54'	21 December 2018	Jong PSV	5–2	Almere City
22	(Netherlands) Boy Deul	Volendam	7' 49' (pen.) 59' (pen.)	28 January 2019	Jong Ajax	1–3	Volendam
23	(Netherlands) Ferdy Druijf	NEC	13' (pen.) 26' 43'	1 February 2019	NEC	4–1	Jong Utrecht
26	(Netherlands) Halil Dervişoğlu	Sparta Rotterdam	6' 43' 59' 80'	24 February 2019	Sparta Rotterdam	6–1	Go Ahead Eagles
26	(Netherlands) Tijjani Reijnders	Jong AZ	28' 38' 56'	22 February 2019	Helmond Sport	1–3	Jong AZ
29	(Germany) Jonathan Okita	NEC	11' 57' 88'	15 March 2019	NEC	5–0	Den Bosch
30	(Belgium) Elton Kabangu	Eindhoven	35' 44' 48'	22 March 2019	Eindhoven	8–1	Dordrecht
37	(France) Robin Maulun	Cambuur	28' (pen.) 45+2' (pen.) 90+2'	26 April 2019	Cambuur	4–1	MVV

Updated to match(es) played on 3 May 2019.

=== Assists ===
Rank	Player	Club	Games	Assist	avg.
1.	(Netherlands) Branco van den Boomen	Eindhoven	36	14	0.39
2.	(Netherlands) Mohamed Rayhi	Sparta Rotterdam	29	12	0.41
3.	(Sweden) Emil Hansson	RKC Waalwijk	35	11	0.31
4.	(Czech Republic) Václav Černý	Jong Ajax	22	10	0.45
4.	(Belgium) Dylan Seys	RKC Waalwijk	36	10	0.28
6.	(Netherlands) Ryan Gravenberch	Jong Ajax	27	9	0.33
6.	(Netherlands) Youri Loen	Almere City	34	9	0.26
6.	(Italy) Stefano Beltrame	Den Bosch	37	9	0.24
6.	(Germany) Jonathan Okita	NEC	37	9	0.24
10.	(Netherlands) Sylla Sow	RKC Waalwijk (~~Jong Utrecht~~)	29	8	0.28
10.	(Spain) Javier Espinosa	Twente	33	8	0.24
10.	(Curaçao) Jeremy Cijntje	Dordrecht	34	8	0.24
10.	(Germany) Mario Engels	Roda JC Kerkrade	34	8	0.24
10.	(Spain) Aitor Cantalapiedra	Twente	35	8	0.23
10.	(Netherlands) Laros Duarte	Sparta Rotterdam (~~Jong PSV~~)	35	8	0.23
10.	(Czech Republic) Jaroslav Navrátil	Go Ahead Eagles	35	8	0.23

Updated to match(es) played on 3 May 2019.
Source: nos.nl

== Attendances ==
Rank	Club	Average	% Change	Highest
1	FC Twente	26,274	4.8%	30,000
2	Sparta Rotterdam	9,039	-10.9%	10,606
3	NEC	8,537	-11.4%	9,888
4	Go Ahead Eagles	8,410	21.9%	9,851
5	SC Cambuur	7,092	-2.7%	8,191
6	Roda JC	6,785	-46.2%	10,069
7	MVV Maastricht	4,418	-9.0%	8,036
8	FC Den Bosch	3,660	31.2%	5,565
9	FC Volendam	3,052	-3.2%	4,752
10	RKC Waalwijk	2,609	21.7%	4,439
11	Almere City	2,316	39.5%	2,851
12	FC Eindhoven	2,310	2.1%	3,285
13	TOP Oss	2,216	11.3%	3,789
14	SC Telstar	2,134	-14.0%	3,263
15	FC Dordrecht	1,767	14.6%	3,011
16	Helmond Sport	1,554	-9.6%	2,843
17	Jong PSV	793	23.2%	2,574
18	Jong Ajax	695	-27.7%	1,300
19	Jong AZ	629	-5.4%	1,924
20	Jong FC Utrecht	529	-22.5%	1,577
