= Rick Stuy van den Herik =

Dutch footballer (born 1993)

Personal information
- Date of birth: 19 June 1993 (age 33)
- Place of birth: Solingen, Germany
- Height: 1.87 m (6 ft 2 in)
- Position: Centre-back

Team information
- Current team: SteDoCo
- Number: 4

Youth career
- 1998–2000: VV Sliedrecht
- 2000–2012: Sparta Rotterdam
- 2012–2013: NAC Breda

Senior career*
Years	Team	Apps	(Gls)
2013–2014	NAC Breda	0	(0)
2014–2023	TOP Oss	307	(21)
2024–	SteDoCo	11	(0)

International career
2008	Netherlands U16	2	(0)
2009–2010	Netherlands U17	1	(0)
- * Club domestic league appearances and goals as of 10 July 2024

Rick Stuy van den Herik (born 19 June 1993) is a Dutch professional footballer who plays as a centre-back for SteDoCo.

A former talent of Sparta Rotterdam, Stuy van den Herik failed to break through to their first team; something which also did not happen at NAC Breda. In 2014, he made the move to second-tier FC Oss, where he made his professional debut the same year and grew out to become a key player during the following years, even becoming team captain.

Stuy van den Herik has represented the Netherlands at under-16 and under-17 level.

== Club career ==
=== Early career ===
Born in the German city of Solingen, North Rhine-Westphalia, Stuy van den Herik grew up in his home country in Sliedrecht. There, he also started his football career at the age of five, where he registered in the youth teams of VV Sliedrecht together with his brother, Kenny. Stuy van den Herik soon caught the eye of larger clubs, and at the age of seven – two years after starting his footballing career – Sparta Rotterdam signed him to their youth academy. There had also been interest from Sparta's 'big brother', Feyenoord, but after a number of trials at the club together with his older brother Kenny, Feyenoord wanted to recruit only Rick. However, they were not interested in signing his brother, Kenny, and Stuy van den Herik eventually chose to sign with Sparta, as they were interested in signing Kenny to the club in addition to Rick. He later stated: "Playing together at one club was of course more convenient for my parents in terms of transport, and moreover, I also liked Sparta more than Feyenoord," in an interview with Jan Volwerk.

After some strong years in the youth of Sparta, where Stuy van den Herik was selected for the Netherlands national under-16 and under-17 teams, enthusiasm around him waned. His youth contract expired in 2012 and was not renewed. Therefore, he had to find a new challenge, and signed with NAC Breda, where he played on an amateur basis in the youth team. His time in Breda, however, did not amount to any success, as after two years he still had not made any senior appearances for the first team.

=== TOP Oss ===
In 2014, Stuy van den Herik chose to sign with FC Oss in the Eerste Divisie, the second tier of Dutch football. There, he finally made his first team debut. In the first game of the 2014–15 season, he played his first minutes in professional football against FC Volendam. He soon became a regular starter for the team, despite the club having four different head coach in his first four years at the club: Wil Boessen, Reinier Robbemond, François Gesthuizen and Klaas Wels, respectively.

Stuy van den Herik grew out to become a key player for TOP Oss, and was even appointed team captain. He led the club to the promotion play-offs during the 2018–19 season, where his former club, Sparta Rotterdam, proved to be too strong in the semi-finals, however. In May 2020, he signed a three-year contract extension. At that point he had made 217 appearances for the club, in which he had made nine goals and nine assists.

On 7 October 2022, Stuy van den Herik, alongside teammate Lorenzo Piqué, reached 300 appearances for TOP Oss. On 27 January 2023, he surpassed Raymond Koopman's record to reach a club record of 315 appearances. On 5 March, he tore the anterior cruciate ligament of his knee, ruling him out for at least nine months and effectively ending his season. Less than a month later, the club decided not to extend his expiring contract, ending his tenure with TOP Oss. He made a total of 320 appearances for the club, scoring 22 goals. The injury meant that Piqué, who also left at the end of the 2022–23 season, held the lone record for TOP Oss with his 327 club appearances.

== International career ==
Stuy van den Herik has gained caps for the Netherlands under-16 and under-17 team. He made two appearances for the former, making his debut against Italy.
