= Joey Sleegers =

Dutch footballer (born 1994)

Personal information
- Full name: Johannes Martinus Sleegers
- Date of birth: 20 July 1994 (age 32)
- Place of birth: Helmond, Netherlands
- Height: 1.77 m (5 ft 10 in)
- Position: Left winger

Team information
- Current team: Roda JC
- Number: 26

Youth career
- –2002: HVV Helmond
- 2002–2006: RKC Waalwijk
- 2006–2013: Feyenoord

Senior career*
Years	Team	Apps	(Gls)
2013–2015	Feyenoord	0	(0)
2014–2015	→ Eindhoven (loan)	33	(13)
2015–2017	NEC	26	(1)
2016–2017	→ VVV-Venlo (loan)	35	(8)
2018–2019	Trenčín	38	(10)
2019–2022	Eindhoven	61	(28)
2022–2023	Dibba Al Fujairah	8	(1)
2023	ADO Den Haag	15	(1)
2023–2025	Eindhoven	49	(6)
2025–2026	Terrassa	13	(3)
2026–	Roda JC	8	(1)

International career
2011	Netherlands U17	1	(0)
2012	Netherlands U18	2	(0)
2014	Netherlands U20	1	(0)
- * Club domestic league appearances and goals as of 4 October 2026

Johannes "Joey" Martinus Sleegers (born 20 July 1994) is a Dutch professional footballer who plays as a left winger for Eerste Divisie club Roda JC.

Sleegers came through the youth systems of RKC Waalwijk and Feyenoord without playing for the latter's first team, and has spent most of his career in the Eerste Divisie, where he has made more than 200 appearances. He has had three separate spells with FC Eindhoven, and was named the Eerste Divisie's most valuable player in 2021–22 after scoring 21 goals. He has also played for NEC, VVV-Venlo, ADO Den Haag, Trenčín in Slovakia, Dibba Al Fujairah in the United Arab Emirates and Terrassa in Spain.

== Club career ==
=== Early career and NEC ===
Sleegers joined the RKC Waalwijk academy as a boy and moved to Feyenoord at the age of 12. He never played a competitive match for the Rotterdam club; loaned to FC Eindhoven for the 2014–15 season, he made his professional debut on 13 September 2014 against Achilles '29 and scored 13 goals in 33 league appearances.

That form earned him a three-year contract at newly promoted NEC on 25 August 2015. He made his Eredivisie debut three days later, starting a 1–0 win away to Willem II before being withdrawn at half-time, and scored his first goal for the club in a draw with SC Heerenveen in February 2016. He spent 2016–17 on loan at VVV-Venlo, scoring eight goals in 35 matches as the club won the Eerste Divisie title, but could not establish himself on his return to Nijmegen.

=== Trenčín and FC Eindhoven ===
On 5 January 2018, Sleegers left the NEC bench for Slovak club Trenčín. He played 18 months there and set up a goal in a 3–0 win over his former club Feyenoord in the third qualifying round of the Europa League.

Sleegers returned to Eindhoven in July 2019, saying that he had wanted to play in the Netherlands again. The second of his three spells at the club was the most productive of his career: in 2021–22 he scored 21 league goals as Eindhoven finished third in the Eerste Divisie.

=== Later career ===
In July 2022, Sleegers left for Dibba Al Fujairah of the UAE Pro League, but returned to the Netherlands after half a season, signing for ADO Den Haag on 5 January 2023. He played there for six months before rejoining Eindhoven for a third spell in July 2023, by which point he had scored 44 goals in 103 matches for the club.

Sleegers moved abroad again in July 2025, joining Terrassa in the Spanish Segunda Federación, but left by mutual agreement at the start of January 2026 after three goals in 15 matches in all competitions. He was without a club for the rest of the season, and on 12 August 2026 signed a one-year contract with Roda JC after a trial, reuniting him with the coach Rob Penders, with whom he had worked at Eindhoven.

== Career statistics ==
As of match played 19 December 2022

Appearances and goals by club, season and competition
Club	Season	League			Cup		Europe		Other		Total	
Club	Season	Division	Apps	Goals	Apps	Goals	Apps	Goals	Apps	Goals	Apps	Goals
Eindhoven (loan)	2014–15	Eerste Divisie	33	13	1	0	—		2 (Note: Appearance(s) in Eerste Divisie promotion play-offs)	0	36	13
NEC	2015–16	Eredivisie	18	1	3	0	—		—		21	1
NEC	2016–17	Eredivisie	1	0	0	0	—		—		1	0
NEC	2017–18	Eerste Divisie	7	0	2	0	—		—		9	0
NEC	Total		26	1	5	0	—		—		31	1
VVV-Venlo (loan)	2016–17	Eerste Divisie	35	8	2	1	—		—		37	9
Trenčín	2017–18	Super Liga	10	2	2	0	0	0	2 (Note: Appearance(s) in Slovak Super Liga European play-offs)	0	14	2
Trenčín	2018–19	Super Liga	28	8	4	3	8 (Note: Appearance(s) in the UEFA Europa League)	1	2 (Note: Appearance(s) in Slovak Super Liga relegation play-offs)	1	42	13
Trenčín	Total		38	10	6	3	8	1	4	1	56	15
Eindhoven	2019–20	Eerste Divisie	10	4	0	0	—		—		10	4
Eindhoven	2020–21	Eerste Divisie	16	3	1	0	—		—		17	3
Eindhoven	2021–22	Eerste Divisie	35	21	1	0	—		4	3	67	24
Eindhoven	Total		61	28	2	0	—		4	3	67	31
Dibba Al Fujairah	2022–23	UAE Pro League	8	1	1	0	—		—		9	1
Career total			201	61	17	4	8	1	10	4	236	70

== Honours ==
VVV-Venlo

- Eerste Divisie: 2016–17

Individual

- Bronzen Stier – Best Player Eerste Divisie: 2014–15
- Gouden Stier – Best Talent Eerste Divisie: 2014–15
