= 2020–21 Eerste Divisie =

65th season of the second-tier football league in Netherlands

Eerste Divisie
- Season: 2020–21
- Dates: 28 August 2020 – 12 May 2021
- Champions: SC Cambuur
- Promoted: SC Cambuur; Go Ahead Eagles; N.E.C.
- Relegated: None
- Matches played: 380
- Goals scored: 1,228 (3.23 per match)
- Top goalscorer: Robert Mühren (38 goals)
- Biggest home win: FC Den Bosch 7–0 Roda JC Kerkrade (23 April 2021)
- Biggest away win: Helmond Sport 0–7 N.E.C. (5 March 2021)
- Highest scoring: Excelsior 4–6 Almere City (6 September 2020); Jong AZ 7–3 De Graafschap (21 September 2020)
- Longest winning run: 8 matches SC Cambuur
- Longest unbeaten run: 13 matches NAC Breda; FC Volendam
- Longest winless run: 20 matches FC Den Bosch
- Longest losing run: 7 matches FC Dordrecht

The 2020–21 Eerste Divisie, known as Keuken Kampioen Divisie for sponsorship reasons, was the sixty-fifth season of Eerste Divisie since its establishment in 1955. It began on 28 August 2020, and came to an end on 12 May 2021.

== Relegation for reserve teams ==
On 1 August 2020, the KNVB detailed on its website in what scenarios the reserve teams in the league would have been relegated from the Eerste Divisie. However, on 24 February 2021, the KNVB eventually discontinued category A senior competitions in this season, including Tweede Divisie, thus no reserves would be relegated.

=== Relegation to the Tweede Divisie ===
- No reserve team from the Eerste Divisie could have been relegated to the Tweede Divisie if the lowest classified reserves team in the Eerste Divisie was to be in the top 10.
- If the lowest classified reserve team in the Eerste Divisie finished between 11th through 18th and the highest classified reserve team in the Tweede Divisie finished first, the two teams were to play each other in a two-legged tie to decide which team would have played in the Eerste Divisie the next season and which team would have played in the Tweede Divisie.
- If the lowest classified reserves in the Eerste Divisie finished 19th or 20th and the highest classified reserves in the Tweede Divisie finished first or second, the lowest classified team from the Eerste Divisie was to be relegated to the Tweede Divisie while the highest classified reserves in the Tweede Divisie was to be promoted to the Eerste Divisie.
- If a reserve team played in the Eerste Divisie and the first team was to be relegated from the Eredivisie to the Eerste Divisie, the reserves were to be automatically relegated to the Tweede Divisie. In case this reserve team was to finish between first through third in the final ranking of reserves, the fourth-placed team would have not been relegated.

== Teams ==
A total of 20 teams are taking part in the league. On 24 April 2020, the 2019–20 season was cancelled due to the COVID-19 pandemic in the Netherlands. As a result, there was no promotion or relegation for the 2019–20 season, and the same teams are competing in the 2020–21 season.

Location of teams in the Eerste Divisie 2020–21

Club	Location	Venue	Capacity
Almere City FC	Almere	Yanmar Stadion	4,501
SC Cambuur	Leeuwarden	Cambuurstadion	10,250
De Graafschap	Doetinchem	Stadion De Vijverberg	12,600
FC Den Bosch	's-Hertogenbosch	Stadion De Vliert	8,713
FC Dordrecht	Dordrecht	Riwal Hoogwerkers Stadion	4,235
FC Eindhoven	Eindhoven	Jan Louwers Stadion	4,600
Excelsior	Rotterdam	Van Donge & De Roo Stadion	4,500
Go Ahead Eagles	Deventer	De Adelaarshorst	10,000
Helmond Sport	Helmond	SolarUnie Stadion	4,174
Jong Ajax	Amsterdam	Sportpark De Toekomst; Johan Cruijff ArenA	2,050; 53,502
Jong AZ	Alkmaar	AFAS Trainingscomplex; AFAS Stadion	200; 17,023
Jong PSV	Eindhoven	PSV Campus De Herdgang; Philips Stadion; Jan Louwers Stadion	2,500; 36,500; 4,600
Jong FC Utrecht	Utrecht	Sportcomplex Zoudenbalch; Stadion Galgenwaard	550; 23,750
MVV Maastricht	Maastricht	Stadion De Geusselt	10,000
NAC Breda	Breda	Rat Verlegh Stadion	19,000
N.E.C.	Nijmegen	Goffertstadion	12,500
Roda JC Kerkrade	Kerkrade	Parkstad Limburg Stadion	19,979
Telstar	Velsen	Rabobank IJmond Stadion	3,060
TOP Oss	Oss	Frans Heesenstadion	4,560
FC Volendam	Volendam	Kras Stadion	7,384

=== Personnel and kits ===
Club	Manager	Kit manufacturer	Sponsors
Almere City FC	(Netherlands) Jeroen Rijsdijk (ad int.)	Craft	Sens Online Solutions
SC Cambuur	(Netherlands) Henk de Jong	Craft	Bouwgroep Dijkstra Draisma
De Graafschap	(Netherlands) Mike Snoei	Hummel	AgriBioSource
FC Den Bosch	(Netherlands) Jack de Gier	Masita	Timmermans Infra
FC Dordrecht	(Netherlands) Jan Zoutman	Jartazi	Keukenwarenhuis.nl
FC Eindhoven	(Netherlands) Ernie Brandts	Nike	VDL Groep
Excelsior	(Netherlands) Marinus Dijkhuizen	Quick	DSW Zorgverzekeraar
Go Ahead Eagles	(Netherlands) Kees van Wonderen	Stanno	Jumper de Diersuper
Helmond Sport	(Netherlands) Wil Boessen	Saller	Heel Helmond Sport
Jong Ajax	(Netherlands) Mitchell van der Gaag	Adidas	Ziggo
Jong AZ	(Netherlands) Michel Vonk	Under Armour	AFAS Software
Jong PSV	(Netherlands) Peter Uneken	Umbro	Metropoolregio Brainport Eindhoven
Jong FC Utrecht	(Netherlands) Ab Plugboer (ad int.)	Nike	T-Mobile
MVV Maastricht	(Bosnia and Herzegovina) Darije Kalezić	Masita	
NAC Breda	(Netherlands) Maurice Steijn	Legea	OK Tankstations
N.E.C.	(Netherlands) Rogier Meijer	Legea	De Klok Groep
Roda JC Kerkrade	(Netherlands) Jurgen Streppel	Legea	Beleef Kerkrade
Telstar	(Netherlands) Andries Jonker	Robey	
TOP Oss	(Netherlands) Klaas Wels	Stanno	Hendriks Bouw en Ontwikkeling
FC Volendam	(Netherlands) Wim Jonk	Jako	HSB Bouw

== Standings ==
Pos	Team	Pld	W	D	L	GF	GA	GD	Pts	Promotion or qualification
1	SC Cambuur (Note: Winner of the First, Second and Fourth Period (rounds 1–9, 10–19 and 29–38).) (C, P)	38	29	5	4	109	36	+73	92	Champion and promotion to the Eredivisie
2	Go Ahead Eagles (P)	38	23	8	7	62	25	+37	77	Promotion to the Eredivisie
3	De Graafschap (Note: Winner of the Third Period (rounds 20–28).)	38	23	8	7	67	47	+20	77	Qualification to promotion play-offs
4	Almere City FC	38	22	9	7	75	48	+27	75	Qualification to promotion play-offs
5	NAC Breda	38	22	7	9	75	41	+34	73	Qualification to promotion play-offs
6	FC Volendam	38	19	9	10	79	52	+27	66	Qualification to promotion play-offs
7	N.E.C. (O, P)	38	20	6	12	68	45	+23	66	Qualification to promotion play-offs
8	Roda JC Kerkrade	38	15	12	11	67	61	+6	57	Qualification to promotion play-offs
9	Excelsior	38	14	6	18	65	66	−1	48	
10	TOP Oss	38	13	8	17	40	57	−17	47	
11	MVV Maastricht	38	13	7	18	50	72	−22	46	
12	Helmond Sport	38	11	12	15	51	68	−17	45	
13	Telstar	38	10	11	17	57	61	−4	41	
14	Jong PSV	38	10	10	18	54	65	−11	40	Reserve teams are not eligible to be promoted to the 2021–22 Eredivisie
15	FC Eindhoven	38	10	10	18	50	62	−12	40	
16	Jong Ajax	38	10	10	18	55	71	−16	40	Reserve teams are not eligible to be promoted to the 2021–22 Eredivisie
17	Jong AZ	38	11	5	22	56	92	−36	38	Reserve teams are not eligible to be promoted to the 2021–22 Eredivisie
18	Jong FC Utrecht	38	11	2	25	53	77	−24	35	Reserve teams are not eligible to be promoted to the 2021–22 Eredivisie
19	FC Den Bosch	38	8	8	22	59	85	−26	32	
20	FC Dordrecht	38	8	3	27	36	97	−61	27	

Source: Soccerway, Keuken Kampioen Divisie (in Dutch)
Rules for classification: Season in progress: 1) Most points won; 2) Less points lost; 3) Goal difference; 4) Goals scored; 5) Alphabetical order; End of season: 1) Points; 2) Goal difference; 3) Goals scored; 4) Head-to-head points; 5) Head-to-head goal difference; 6) Head-to-head away goals scored; 7) Play-off if relevant for deciding champion, relegation or participating in a European league, otherwise by draw. 8) Penalty shoot-out (only after a play-off)
(C) Champions; (O) Play-off winners; (P) Promoted

== Period tables ==
=== Period 1 ===
Pos	Team	Pld	W	D	L	GF	GA	GD	Pts	Qualification
1	SC Cambuur	9	7	1	1	33	8	+25	22	Qualification to promotion play-offs
2	De Graafschap	9	7	1	1	20	12	+8	22	
3	Almere City FC	9	6	3	0	19	8	+11	21	
4	NAC Breda	9	6	0	3	18	10	+8	18	
5	N.E.C.	9	5	1	3	18	10	+8	16	
6	FC Volendam	9	4	3	2	23	11	+12	15	
7	Telstar	9	4	3	2	18	13	+5	15	
8	Jong Ajax	9	5	0	4	19	17	+2	15	Reserves teams cannot participate in the promotion play-offs
9	Excelsior	9	4	1	4	19	16	+3	13	
10	Roda JC Kerkrade	9	3	3	3	17	14	+3	12	
11	Go Ahead Eagles	9	3	3	3	10	8	+2	12	
12	FC Eindhoven	9	3	3	3	13	18	−5	12	
13	TOP Oss	9	3	2	4	9	14	−5	11	
14	Jong PSV	9	3	1	5	15	20	−5	10	Reserves teams cannot participate in the promotion play-offs
15	MVV Maastricht	9	2	2	5	10	22	−12	8	
16	FC Den Bosch	9	2	1	6	10	19	−9	7	
17	Helmond Sport	9	2	1	6	6	16	−10	7	
18	Jong AZ	9	2	1	6	18	31	−13	7	Reserves teams cannot participate in the promotion play-offs
19	Jong FC Utrecht	9	2	0	7	11	21	−10	6	Reserves teams cannot participate in the promotion play-offs
20	FC Dordrecht	9	1	2	6	7	25	−18	5	

Source: Keuken Kampioen Divisie (in Dutch)
Rules for classification: 1) points; 2) goal difference; 3) number of goals scored

=== Period 2 ===
Pos	Team	Pld	W	D	L	GF	GA	GD	Pts	Qualification
1	SC Cambuur	10	8	0	2	25	10	+15	24	Period 1 winner
2	Almere City FC	10	7	2	1	23	14	+9	23	Qualification to promotion play-offs
3	Go Ahead Eagles	10	6	2	2	14	7	+7	20	
4	Jong FC Utrecht	10	6	1	3	19	14	+5	19	Reserves teams cannot participate in the promotion play-offs
5	NAC Breda	10	5	3	2	17	7	+10	18	
6	FC Volendam	10	5	3	2	21	12	+9	18	
7	N.E.C.	10	5	3	2	18	15	+3	18	
8	De Graafschap	10	5	1	4	18	16	+2	16	
9	FC Eindhoven	10	4	3	3	19	16	+3	15	
10	Helmond Sport	10	3	5	2	18	16	+2	14	
11	Roda JC Kerkrade	10	3	5	2	12	12	0	14	
12	TOP Oss	10	4	2	4	7	10	−3	14	
13	Telstar	10	4	1	5	16	15	+1	13	
14	Jong PSV	10	2	3	5	15	18	−3	9	Reserves teams cannot participate in the promotion play-offs
15	Jong Ajax	10	1	5	4	14	20	−6	8	Reserves teams cannot participate in the promotion play-offs
16	MVV Maastricht	10	2	2	6	12	22	−10	8	
17	Jong AZ	10	2	2	6	7	17	−10	8	Reserves teams cannot participate in the promotion play-offs
18	Excelsior	10	2	1	7	15	19	−4	7	
19	FC Dordrecht	10	2	0	8	11	26	−15	6	
20	FC Den Bosch	10	0	4	6	9	24	−15	4	

Source: Keuken Kampioen Divisie (in Dutch)
Rules for classification: 1) points; 2) goal difference; 3) number of goals scored

=== Period 3 ===
Pos	Team	Pld	W	D	L	GF	GA	GD	Pts	Qualification
1	De Graafschap	9	8	1	0	19	8	+11	25	Qualification to promotion play-offs
2	NAC Breda	9	7	2	0	22	10	+12	23	
3	Go Ahead Eagles	9	7	1	1	17	3	+14	22	
4	SC Cambuur	9	6	3	0	19	4	+15	21	Period 1 & 2 winner
5	N.E.C.	9	6	1	2	21	6	+15	19	
6	Roda JC Kerkrade	9	6	1	2	25	15	+10	19	
7	Excelsior	9	5	1	3	19	14	+5	16	
8	MVV Maastricht	9	5	1	3	10	10	0	16	
9	Almere City FC	9	5	0	4	21	16	+5	15	
10	FC Volendam	9	4	2	3	18	16	+2	14	
11	FC Dordrecht	9	3	1	5	9	19	−10	10	
12	Helmond Sport	9	2	3	4	14	19	−5	9	
13	Jong Ajax	9	2	2	5	12	19	−7	8	Reserves teams cannot participate in the promotion play-offs
14	FC Den Bosch	9	2	2	5	14	23	−9	8	
15	Jong AZ	9	2	2	5	15	27	−12	8	Reserves teams cannot participate in the promotion play-offs
16	Telstar	9	1	3	5	11	15	−4	6	
17	TOP Oss	9	2	0	7	14	24	−10	6	
18	Jong PSV	9	1	2	6	7	19	−12	5	Reserves teams cannot participate in the promotion play-offs
19	Jong FC Utrecht	9	1	0	8	8	19	−11	3	Reserves teams cannot participate in the promotion play-offs
20	FC Eindhoven	9	0	2	7	6	15	−9	2	

Source: Keuken Kampioen Divisie (in Dutch)
Rules for classification: 1) points; 2) goal difference; 3) number of goals scored

=== Period 4 ===
Pos	Team	Pld	W	D	L	GF	GA	GD	Pts	Qualification
1	SC Cambuur	10	8	1	1	32	14	+18	25	Period 1 & 2 winner
2	Go Ahead Eagles	10	7	2	1	21	7	+14	23	Qualification to promotion play-offs
3	FC Volendam	10	6	1	3	17	13	+4	19	
4	Jong PSV	10	4	4	2	17	8	+9	16	Reserves teams cannot participate in the promotion play-offs
5	Almere City FC	10	4	4	2	12	10	+2	16	
6	TOP Oss	10	4	4	2	10	9	+1	16	
7	Jong AZ	10	5	0	5	16	17	−1	15	Reserves teams cannot participate in the promotion play-offs
8	Helmond Sport	10	4	3	3	13	17	−4	15	
9	NAC Breda	10	4	2	4	18	14	+4	14	
10	MVV Maastricht	10	4	2	4	18	18	0	14	
11	De Graafschap	10	3	5	2	10	11	−1	14	Period 3 winner
12	FC Den Bosch	10	4	1	5	26	19	+7	13	
13	N.E.C.	10	4	1	5	11	14	−3	13	
14	Excelsior	10	3	3	4	12	17	−5	12	
15	Roda JC Kerkrade	10	3	3	4	13	20	−7	12	
16	FC Eindhoven	10	3	2	5	12	13	−1	11	
17	Jong Ajax	10	2	3	5	10	15	−5	9	Reserves teams cannot participate in the promotion play-offs
18	Telstar	10	1	4	5	12	18	−6	7	
19	Jong FC Utrecht	10	2	1	7	15	23	−8	7	Reserves teams cannot participate in the promotion play-offs
20	FC Dordrecht	10	2	0	8	9	27	−18	6	

Source: Keuken Kampioen Divisie (in Dutch)
Rules for classification: 1) points; 2) goal difference; 3) number of goals scored

== Fixtures/results ==
Home \ Away	ALM	CAM	DBO	DOR	EIN	EXC	GAE	GRA	HEL	JAJ	JAZ	JPS	JUT	MVV	NAC	NEC	RJC	TEL	TOP	VOL
Almere City FC		0–2	2–0	3–0	0–0	4–1	3–0	1–0	2–0	1–0	2–0	1–1	4–1	0–0	2–0	2–0	2–1	1–1	3–0	1–2
SC Cambuur	7–2		3–1	5–0	3–0	7–2	0–2	1–1	4–1	2–3	2–0	5–1	5–2	2–0	3–2	2–0	3–0	3–1	3–0	0–1
FC Den Bosch	1–1	3–5		2–1	1–1	0–1	3–3	2–3	1–2	2–2	1–2	1–2	3–0	2–0	1–1	2–2	7–0	4–1	1–0	1–5
FC Dordrecht	2–2	0–1	2–6		1–5	1–3	0–0	0–2	2–1	3–1	2–0	2–3	0–3	0–1	2–3	1–2	0–5	1–0	1–3	0–0
FC Eindhoven	1–3	2–5	1–0	5–1		1–1	0–2	3–2	0–0	3–0	3–0	0–2	2–2	4–0	2–4	0–1	3–3	2–3	0–0	1–1
Excelsior	4–6	0–1	4–4	3–0	1–0		0–1	1–2	0–3	5–1	4–1	0–0	2–0	2–0	0–3	2–1	1–3	1–2	3–0	2–3
Go Ahead Eagles	3–0	0–0	3–0	5–1	3–0	0–0		0–0	5–1	0–3	0–1	1–0	2–3	3–0	0–0	2–1	0–0	1–0	1–0	1–3
De Graafschap	2–2	0–2	4–2	0–3	1–0	1–1	1–0		0–0	2–2	1–1	2–1	3–1	1–0	1–0	2–0	4–0	2–0	2–1	2–5
Helmond Sport	2–1	1–5	4–0	5–2	1–0	2–1	0–2	1–2		1–1	2–0	1–0	2–1	1–1	0–2	0–7	1–2	1–1	1–1	0–1
Jong Ajax	1–4	1–1	1–2	1–2	1–1	3–0	0–2	1–1	2–2		3–2	1–2	3–2	4–3	1–1	0–1	0–4	1–2	0–1	1–1
Jong AZ	2–5	2–4	2–1	4–0	3–2	2–1	0–3	7–3	2–2	2–1		1–4	3–2	3–3	2–3	0–3	0–1	1–1	0–1	2–6
Jong PSV	1–2	0–1	1–0	0–1	1–2	1–6	2–3	0–2	2–2	1–2	3–0		1–1	3–1	1–1	1–1	1–1	3–0	0–0	0–1
Jong FC Utrecht	1–3	1–3	3–1	3–1	1–2	3–2	0–1	0–1	2–1	1–2	1–2	1–6		0–1	0–2	1–4	2–0	1–2	0–1	2–3
MVV Maastricht	2–0	1–7	3–1	3–1	2–0	1–0	0–2	2–3	1–1	1–5	3–2	3–3	0–2		1–4	2–1	2–4	2–0	3–0	2–2
NAC Breda	4–0	0–4	2–1	0–1	2–1	1–2	0–1	3–1	3–2	4–0	6–1	2–1	3–1	2–0		0–1	2–2	1–0	3–0	3–0
N.E.C.	0–1	0–0	4–1	2–1	6–0	3–2	2–1	1–2	2–2	2–1	3–2	2–0	2–0	2–1	0–2		1–1	1–1	0–1	1–0
Roda JC Kerkrade	0–0	3–1	0–0	4–0	2–1	3–1	0–3	1–3	2–2	2–2	0–1	5–1	2–1	2–0	3–3	1–3		1–1	3–0	1–1
Telstar	2–3	1–2	6–1	2–0	1–1	1–1	1–2	1–2	2–0	1–2	2–2	2–2	2–3	1–2	1–2	5–2	3–1		1–1	2–2
TOP Oss	2–4	2–2	2–0	2–0	0–1	1–3	0–4	0–2	1–2	1–0	6–0	3–2	0–4	2–2	0–0	2–1	2–0	1–4		2–0
FC Volendam	2–2	0–3	6–0	7–1	2–0	0–2	0–0	1–4	5–1	3–2	2–1	5–1	0–1	0–1	2–1	1–3	3–4	2–0	1–1	

Source: Soccerway, Keuken Kampioen Divisie (in Dutch)
Legend: Blue = home team win; Yellow = draw; Red = away team win.

== Statistics ==
=== Top scorers ===
Rank	Player	Club	Goals
1	(Netherlands) Robert Mühren	SC Cambuur	38
2	(Iceland) Elías Már Ómarsson	Excelsior	22
3	(Netherlands) Thomas Verheydt	Almere City	20
3	(Netherlands) Jizz Hornkamp	FC Den Bosch	20
5	(Suriname) Jeredy Hilterman	Jong FC Utrecht	19
5	(Netherlands) Glynor Plet	Telstar	19
7	(Italy) Samuele Mulattieri	FC Volendam	18
8	(Netherlands) Sydney van Hooijdonk	NAC Breda	15
9	(Netherlands) Ralf Seuntjens	De Graafschap	14
10	(Netherlands) Mounir El Allouchi	NAC Breda	13
