= 2024–25 US Triestina Calcio 1918 season =

US Triestina Calcio 1918
2024–25 season
- Manager: Michele Santoni (until 27 September); Geppino Marino (caretaker, 27 September–21 October); Pep Clotet (from 21 October to 27 November); Attilio Tesser (from 27 November)
- Stadium: Stadio Nereo Rocco
- Serie C: 19th
- Coppa Italia Serie C: First round

The 2024–25 season is US Triestina Calcio 1918's fourth consecutive campaign in Serie C, the third tier of Italian football. The team is also competing in the Coppa Italia Serie C.

== Competitions ==
=== Overall record ===
Competition	First match	Last match	Starting round	Final position	Record							
Competition	First match	Last match	Starting round	Final position	Pld	W	D	L	GF	GA	GD	Win %
Serie C	24 August 2024		Matchday 1		21	4	5	12	19	29	−10	19.05
Coppa Italia Serie C	10 August 2024		First round	First round	1	0	0	1	0	1	−1	0.00
Total					22	4	5	13	19	30	−11	18.18

Last updated: 4 January 2025
Source: Competitions

=== Serie C ===
==== League table ====
Pos	Team	Pld	W	D	L	GF	GA	GD	Pts	Qualification
14	Pergolettese	38	11	9	18	36	49	−13	42	
15	Lumezzane	38	9	15	14	40	55	−15	42	
16	Triestina (Note: 5 point deducted due to administrative irregularities.) (O)	38	12	8	18	40	45	−5	39	Relegation play-outs
17	Pro Vercelli (O)	38	9	10	19	30	51	−21	37	Relegation play-outs
18	Pro Patria (Note: Later restored in Serie C following Lucchese’s bankruptcy.) (T)	38	6	16	16	32	44	−12	34	Relegation play-outs

Source: Lega Pro, Soccerway (in English)
Rules for classification: 1) Points; 2) Head-to-head points; 3) Head-to-head goal difference; 4) Goal difference; 5) Goals scored; 6) Lower goals against; 7) Wins; 8) Lower losses; 9) Away wins; 10) Lower home losses.
(Note: Head-to-head record is used only after all the matches between the teams in question have been played)
(O) Play-off winners; (T) Qualified, but not yet for the particular phase indicated

==== Results summary ====
Overall								Home						Away					
Pld	W	D	L	GF	GA	GD	Pts	W	D	L	GF	GA	GD	W	D	L	GF	GA	GD
21	4	5	12	19	29	−10	16	3	2	6	13	15	−2	1	3	6	6	14	−8

Last updated: 4 January 2025.
Source: Worldfootball

==== Results by round ====
Round	1	2	3	4	5	6	7	8	9	10	11	12	13	14	15	16	17	18	19	20	21
Ground	H	A	H	H	A	H	A	H	A	H	A	H	A	H	A	H	A	H	A	A	H
Result	W	L	L	L	L	L	D	D	L	L	L	D	D	L	L	L	D	W	W	L	W
Position	1	8	13	16	18	19	18	18	19	19	20	20	19	20	20	20	20	19	19	19	

Updated to match(es) played on 4 January 2025. Source: Worldfootball
A = Away; H = Home; W = Win; D = Draw; L = Loss

==== Matches ====
The league schedule was released on 15 July 2024.

24 August 2024 1	Triestina	3–0	Arzignano Valchiampo

31 August 2024 2	Union Clodiense	1–0	Triestina

8 September 2024 3	Triestina	0–1	Caldiero Terme

15 September 2024 4	Triestina	1–5	Atalanta U23

21 September 2024 5	Lecco	2–1	Triestina

26 September 2024 6	Triestina	2–3	Lumezzane

29 September 2024 7	Trento	1–1	Triestina

5 October 2024 8	Triestina	1–1	Pro Vercelli

12 October 2024 9	Alcione Milano	1–0	Triestina

19 October 2024 10	Triestina	0–2	Virtus Verona

26 October 2024 11	Pergolettese	1–0	Triestina

30 October 2024 12	Triestina	1–1	AlbinoLeffe

3 November 2024 13	Pro Patria	0–0	Triestina

8 November 2024 14	Triestina	0–1	Giana Erminio

17 November 2024 15	Feralpisalò	2–0	Triestina

22 November 2024 16	Triestina	0–1	Renate

1 December 2024 17	Padova	1–1	Triestina

8 December 2024 18	Triestina	2–0	Vicenza

14 December 2024 19	Novara	2–3	Triestina

21 December 2024 20	Arzignano Valchiampo	3–0	Triestina

4 January 2025 21	Triestina	3–0	Union Clodiense

=== Coppa Italia Serie C ===
10 August 2024 First round	Triestina	0–1	Trento
18:00
