= Reinier Robbemond =

Dutch football manager (born 1972)

Personal information
- Date of birth: 31 January 1972 (age 54)
- Place of birth: Dordrecht, Netherlands
- Height: 1.84 m (6 ft 0 in)
- Position: Midfielder

Youth career
- ODS Dordrecht
- SC Feyenoord

Senior career*
Years	Team	Apps	(Gls)
1990–1996	Dordrecht '90	111	(4)
1996–2001	Utrecht	143	(19)
2001–2004	AZ	54	(0)
2004–2009	De Graafschap	104	(6)
Total		412	(29)

Managerial career
- 2009–2014: AZ (youth)
- 2014–2015: Jong AZ
- 2012–2016: Netherlands U18 (assistant)
- 2015–2016: FC Oss
- 2016–2018: Willem II (assistant)
- 2018: Willem II (caretaker)
- 2018–2019: PSV (assistant)
- 2021: Maccabi Tel Aviv (assistant)
- 2021–2022: De Graafschap
- 2022: Willem II (assistant)
- 2022–2023: Willem II
- * Club domestic league appearances and goals

Reinier Robbemond (born 31 January 1972) is a Dutch professional football manager and former player.

A midfielder, Robbemond's professional playing career spanned 19 years and was spent at four clubs: Dordrecht '90, Utrecht, AZ and De Graafschap. He made 412 appearances in which he scored 29 goals.

Following his playing career, Robbemond transitioned into coaching. Initially serving as a youth coach at AZ, he briefly held the position of head coach at FC Oss. He later worked as an assistant coach during two periods at Willem II and gained experience as an assistant at Israeli club Maccabi Tel Aviv. His managerial journey continued as he took on the role of head coach at De Graafschap before returning to Willem II, initially as an assistant coach and subsequently as head coach.

== Playing career ==
Born in Dordrecht, Robbemond played for ODS and SC Feyenoord in his youth. Robbemond made his debut in professional football on 8 December 1990, coming on as a substitute for Dordrecht '90 in an away match at VVV. He made more than 100 appearances for his hometown club before he left for FC Utrecht in 1996. In Utrecht, Robbemond played five seasons as a regular starter in midfield. In 2001, he moved to AZ, where he played for three seasons, but was mostly utilised as a substitute for his last two years at the club. Between 2004 and 2009, Robbemond played for De Graafschap. However, when De Graafschap suffered relegation for the second time in five years, his contract was not extended, and he announced his retirement from professional football.

== Managerial career ==
Robbemond started working as a youth coach for AZ in the summer of 2009 shortly after announcing his retirement as a player. After training various youth teams at the club, he became the head coach of the reserve team of AZ, Jong AZ, for the 2014–15 season. Robbemond succeeded Wil Boessen as head coach of second-tier Eerste Divisie club FC Oss from the 2015–16 season. On 6 April 2016, it was announced that he would be dismissed from his position after the season, as Oss finished last in the league table. However, the club did not suffer relegation due to structural changes of the Dutch football league system.

Robbemond signed a contract with Willem in June 2016, where he became an assistant to the then newly appointed manager Erwin van de Looi. On 8 March 2018, van de Looi announced that he would resign immediately, after supporters had urged the board to leave via a manifesto. Robbemond succeeded van de Looi as interim trainer. Willem II won the first match with Robbemond as coach 5-0 over PSV, who were first in the league table at the time. Robbemond finished the season as head coach. On 26 June 2018, it was announced that Robbemond would become manager Mark van Bommel's assistant coach at PSV, and he signed a two-year contract. Van Bommel was dismissed on 15 December 2019 due to the poor results, which meant that assistant coaches Robbemond and Jürgen Dirkx were also let go. In January 2021, he became an assistant to Patrick van Leeuwen at Maccabi Tel Aviv.

On 16 June 2021, he signed a two-year contract to become manager of De Graafschap. He succeeded the dismissed Mike Snoei. He was fired from his position on 16 March 2022 following a streak of disappointing results.

Robbemond was appointed assistant coach to Kevin Hofland at Willem II on 4 April 2022, returning to the position after a four-year absence. Hofland was dismissed on 12 December 2022, with Robbemond becoming the caretaker manager. On 5 January 2023, Robbemond was confirmed as a permanent manager, signing a contract until mid-2024.

Robbemond was released by Willem II on 5 September 2023. The decision came after the team's elimination from the previous season's promotion playoffs, during which they conceded two-goal leads in consecutive matches against VVV-Venlo. Additionally, a sluggish start to the 2023–24 season, with only one win in four games, culminating in a 4–1 loss to arch-rival NAC Breda, contributed to his departure.

== Statistics ==
Season	Club	Country	League	Apps	Goals
1990/91	Dordrecht '90	Netherlands	Eerste Divisie	12	2
1991/92	SVV/Dordrecht '90	Netherlands	Eredivisie	1	0
1992/93	SVV/Dordrecht '90	Netherlands	Eredivisie	14	0
1993/94	Dordrecht '90	Netherlands	Eerste Divisie	21	0
1994/95	Dordrecht '90	Netherlands	Eredivisie	33	1
1995/96	Dordrecht '90	Netherlands	Eerste Divisie	30	1
1996/97	FC Utrecht	Netherlands	Eredivisie	33	1
1997/98	FC Utrecht	Netherlands	Eredivisie	26	6
1998/99	FC Utrecht	Netherlands	Eredivisie	31	6
1999/2000	FC Utrecht	Netherlands	Eredivisie	31	5
2000/01	FC Utrecht	Netherlands	Eredivisie	22	1
2001/02	AZ	Netherlands	Eredivisie	28	0
2002/03	AZ	Netherlands	Eredivisie	14	0
2003/04	AZ	Netherlands	Eredivisie	12	0
2004/05	De Graafschap	Netherlands	Eredivisie	13	1
2005/06	De Graafschap	Netherlands	Eerste Divisie	22	3
2006/07	De Graafschap	Netherlands	Eerste Divisie	34	2
2007/08	De Graafschap	Netherlands	Eredivisie	23	0
2008/09	De Graafschap	Netherlands	Eredivisie	9	0
Total				409	29

Last update: 6 December 2008
