= Rob Penders =

Dutch footballer

Personal information
- Date of birth: 31 December 1975 (age 50)
- Place of birth: Zaandam, Netherlands
- Height: 1.94 m (6 ft 4 1/2 in)
- Position: Defender

Team information
- Current team: Roda JC Kerkrade (head coach)

Senior career*
| Years | Team | Apps | (Gls) |
| 1994–2000 | RBC Roosendaal | 156 | (16) |
| 2000–2011 | NAC Breda | 276 | (19) |

Managerial career
- 2014–2019: NAC Breda (assistant)
- 2016–2017: NAC Breda B
- 2019–2021: ADO Den Haag (U19)
- 2021–2023: FC Eindhoven
- 2023–2026: Utrecht (assistant)
- 2026–: Roda JC Kerkrade
- * Club domestic league appearances and goals

Rob Penders (born 31 December 1975) is a Dutch football coach and a former player who mainly played for NAC Breda during his career. He is the head coach of Eerste Divisie club Roda JC Kerkrade. Penders was a defender who made his debut in professional football, being part of the RBC Roosendaal squad in the 1994–95 season. In the season 1999-2000 he joined NAC Breda. He played there for 10 seasons.

== Coaching career ==
After retiring, Penders worked for NAC Breda as a youth coach. In October 2014, he was named as temporarily assistant manager for the first team. In the 2016–17 season, Penders was in charge of the club's reserve team in addition to assisting the first team. He left the club on 22 March 2019 where he was fired.

On 5 June 2019, he was appointed as U19 manager of ADO Den Haag for the upcoming season.

On 17 June 2023, Penders was hired as an assistant coach by Utrecht.

On 20 April 2026, Penders signed a two-season contract with Roda JC Kerkrade, beginning in the 2026–27 season.
