= Michele Santoni =

Italian football manager (born 1980)

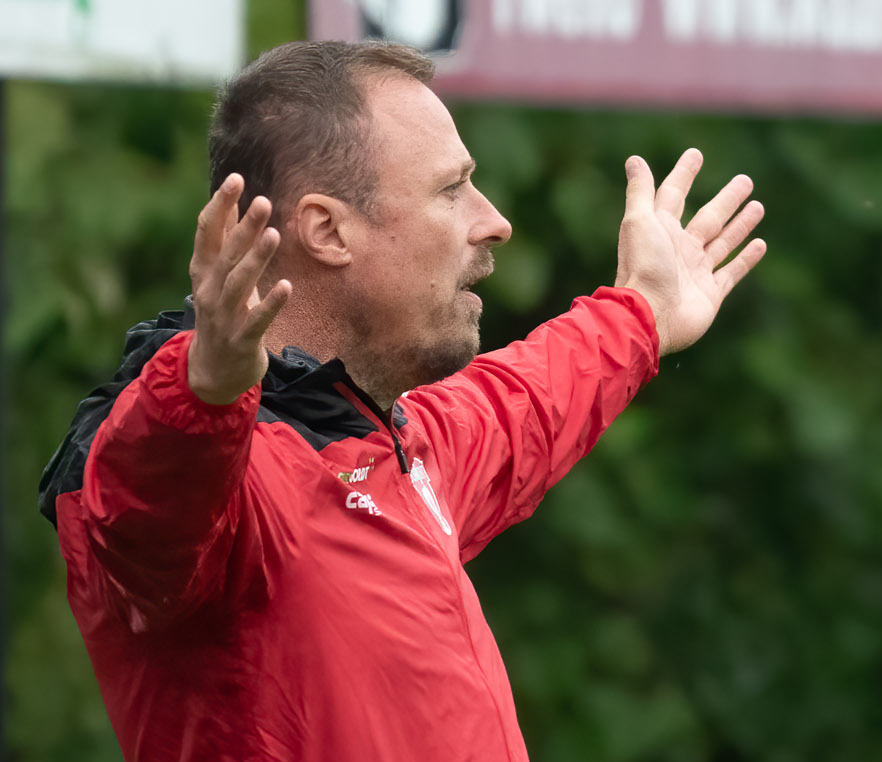
- Santoni in 2023

Personal information
- Date of birth: 18 May 1980 (age 46)
- Place of birth: Arco, Italy

Managerial career
- Years: Team
- 2018–2019: Almere City
- 2021–2024: FC Dordrecht
- 2024: Triestina
- 2025–2026: Pro Vercelli

Michele Santoni (born 18 May 1980) is an Italian professional football manager.

== Coaching career ==
Santoni began his coaching career in 2008 as a youth coach at HFC Haarlem, then competing in the Dutch second tier. Reflecting on his early work in the Netherlands, Santoni later described Dutch football as being characterised by a strong emphasis on structure and organisation, remarking that it was "structure, structure, structure, structure".

In 2009, he joined Ajax as a video analyst, working within the club's first-team environment.

In 2014, Santoni moved to Italy, where he was appointed assistant coach at Livorno in Serie A. Discussing differences he observed after the move, Santoni contrasted the Dutch approach with what he perceived as a greater reliance on intuition in Italy, stating that "there is much more improvisation; it goes by feel". He subsequently worked in the youth academy of Lazio before being appointed video analyst at Inter.

== Managerial career ==
In 2018, Santoni was appointed head coach of Almere City, succeeding Jack de Gier. The team made a strong start to the season and spent a period at the top of the Eerste Divisie. However, results deteriorated approaching the winter break, and on 2 March 2019 Santoni was dismissed with the club in tenth place.

On 13 May 2020, Santoni was appointed assistant coach at ADO Den Haag, effective from the 2020–21 season. In early November 2020, he and fellow assistant coach Rick Hoogendorp were removed from the first-team technical staff by the club's management. Head coach Aleksandar Ranković was dismissed shortly thereafter, on 7 November. Santoni remained at the club for the remainder of the season, working within ADO's youth academy.

In 2021, he was appointed manager of FC Dordrecht in the Netherlands. After three years in the Dutch second division, Santoni departed in May 2024 to become the new head coach of Italian Serie C club Triestina on a two-year contract. After a negative start of the season with five defeats in the first six league games, however, Santoni was dismissed on 27 September 2024.

On 11 June 2025, Santoni was unveiled as the new head coach of Serie C club Pro Vercelli.

== Personal life ==
Born in Arco, Trentino, Santoni is the son of an Italian father and a Dutch mother and is fluent in Italian, Dutch and English.

== Managerial statistics ==
As of match played 10 December 2025

Managerial record by team and tenure
Team	From	To	Record								Ref.
Team	From	To	M	W	D	L	GF	GA	GD	Win %	Ref.
Almere City	1 July 2018	5 March 2019	29	13	4	12	42	48	−6	44.83	
FC Dordrecht	1 July 2021	30 June 2024	119	37	33	49	172	209	−37	31.09	
Triestina	1 July 2024	27 September 2024	7	1	0	6	7	13	−6	14.29	
Pro Vercelli	11 June 2025	Present	21	10	3	8	29	24	+5	47.62	
Total			176	61	40	75	250	294	−44	34.66	
