= Klaas Wels =

Dutch football manager

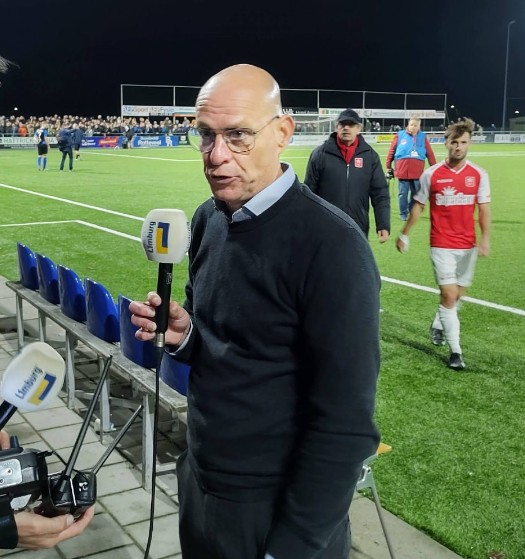
- Klaas Wels

Personal information
- Date of birth: 2 September 1973 (age 53)
- Place of birth: Schijndel, Netherlands
- Position: Defender

Senior career*
Years	Team	Apps	(Gls)
- Blauw Geel '38
- Den Bosch (reserves)
- RKSV Schijndel

Managerial career
- 2004–2008: RKSV Schijndel (youth)
- 2008–2009: Festilent
- 2009–2010: Best Vooruit
- 2010–2017: FC Oss (assistant)
- 2012–2014: Deurne
- 2014–2016: RKSV Nemelaer
- 2016–2017: DESO
- 2017–2021: TOP Oss
- 2021–2022: MVV Maastricht
- 2022–2023: TOP Oss (technical director)
- 2022–2023: TOP Oss (assistant)
- 2023: TOP Oss
- * Club domestic league appearances and goals

Klaas Wels (born 2 September 1973) is a Dutch professional football manager.

== Playing career ==
Wels was a defender. During his active playing career, he represented hometown club RKSV Schijndel since his childhood. He also played two seasons for Blauw Geel '38 and one season for the reserves of FC Den Bosch. After this, he returned to RKSV Schijndel.

== Managerial career ==
Wels started his coaching career in 2004 at RKSV Schijndel. There, he became coach of the club's second team. From 2008 to 2009, he was head coach of Festilent, after which he left for Best Vooruit. In August 2010, his contract with the club was terminated, and he began working at FC Oss as an assistant coach. In March 2012, it was announced that Wels would combine his work at FC Oss with the head coaching position at SV Deurne. He signed a contract for two seasons. He won the South II District of the KNVB Amateur Cup with the club in 2013. After two seasons, Wels left Deurne. In January 2014, it was announced that Wels became the new head coach of RKSV Nemelaer on 1 July 2014.

At the end of the 2015–16 season, Wels left RKSV Nemelaer and started working for RKVV DESO. On 15 March 2017, Wels again became caretaker head coach of TOP Oss – which had changed its name from FC Oss – after the resignation of former head coach François Gesthuizen. At that time, TOP was 17th in the second-tier Eerste Divisie. He would then become head coach at TOP in June 2017, after "changing the dynamics at the club", according to chairman Peter Bijvelds.

== Managerial statistics ==
As of 10 July 2022.

Team	From	To	Record							
Team	From	To	G	W	D	L	GF	GA	GD	Win %
TOP Oss	15 March 2017	30 June 2021	160	55	34	71	194	250	−56	34.38
MVV Maastricht	1 July 2022	29 March 2022	34	10	2	22	37	71	−34	29.41
Total			194	65	36	93	231	321	−90	33.51
