= Jack de Gier =

Dutch footballer and manager

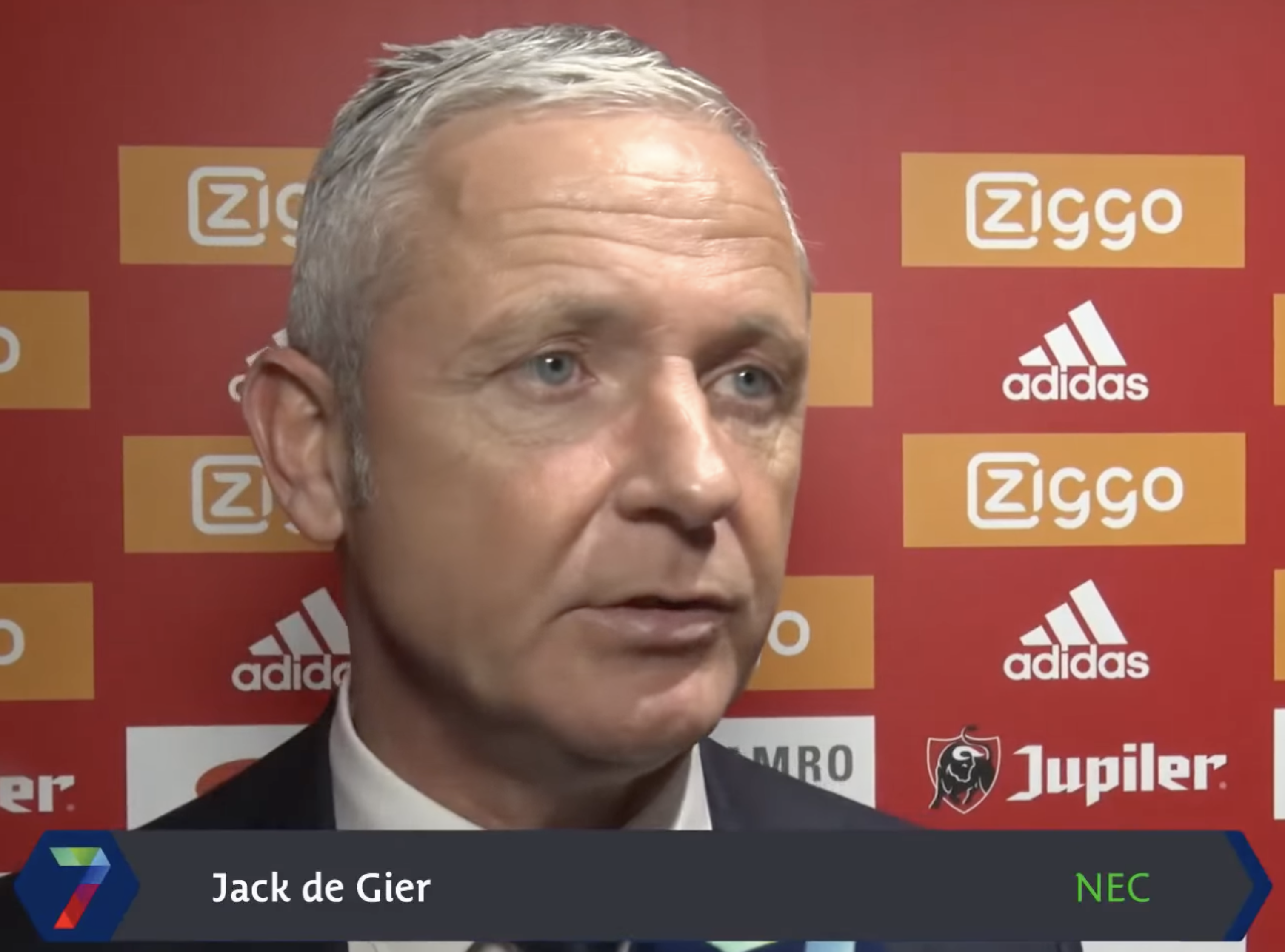

Personal information
- Date of birth: 6 August 1968 (age 58)
- Place of birth: Schijndel, Netherlands
- Height: 1.82 m (6 ft 0 in)
- Position: Forward

Youth career
- RKSV Schijndel

Senior career*
Years	Team	Apps	(Gls)
1988–1991	BVV Den Bosch	96	(35)
1991–1994	Cambuur	81	(32)
1994–1995	Go Ahead Eagles	30	(11)
1995–1997	Willem II	63	(17)
1997–1998	Lierse S.K.	19	(5)
1998–2001	NEC	87	(28)
2001	Dunfermline Athletic	12	(5)
2001–2003	FC Twente	25	(6)
Total		413	(139)

Managerial career
- 2003–2008: SVZW (assistant)
- 2009–2012: Jong NEC
- 2010–2012: NEC (assistant)
- 2012–2013: Blauw-Wit Amsterdam
- 2013–2014: NEC (assistant)
- 2014–2015: NEC (U21)
- 2014–2016: OSV Oostzaan
- 2015: Jong NEC
- 2016–2018: Almere City
- 2018–2019: NEC
- 2019–2020: Go Ahead Eagles
- 2021–2023: FC Den Bosch
- * Club domestic league appearances and goals

Jack de Gier (Dutch pronunciation: [ˈdʑɛɡ də ˈɣiːr]; born 6 August 1968) is a Dutch professional football manager and former player who played as a forward.

He was nicknamed Il Butre (The Vulture), after legendary Spain striker Emilio Butragueño. ("De Gier" is Dutch for "The Vulture".) De Gier made his professional debut in the 1988–89 season for BVV Den Bosch. He scored the final goal in Ajax's former stadium "De Meer" on 28 April 1996 for Willem II.

== Club career ==
Born in Schijndel, the burly but prolific De Gier started his career at local amateur side RKSV Schijndel and then professionally at BVV Den Bosch, making his debut in August 1988 at the age of 20. A prolific striker, De Gier joined SC Cambuur in 1991 and later played for Go Ahead Eagles and Willem II before moving abroad to play for Belgian side Lierse SK. He returned to the Netherlands and joined NEC Nijmegen, only to sign for Scottish side Dunfermline Athletic in 2001. He finished his career at FC Twente after the 2002–03 season when he tore his right Achilles tendon during a friendly game.

== Managerial career ==
De Gier began his managerial career in professional football on 1 January 2016 as a head coach of Eerste Divisie club Almere City, replacing the dismissed Maarten Stekelenburg. At that point, Almere were bottom of the league alongside RKC Waalwijk. He managed to lead the club from the bottom of the competition to finish in eighth place and win a period title, which allowed the club to participate in the post-season play-offs for promotion to the Eredivisie. However, Willem II proved too strong for Almere City. The club started the 2016–17 season in weak form, but later recovered, partly due to a series of eight consecutive wins; a club record. In February 2017, the club extended its expiring contract until the summer of 2018 with an option for another year

On 25 May 2018, NEC Nijmegen announced that they had appointed De Gier as head coach as of 1 July 2018. After a series of poor results, De Gier was fired on 2 April 2019.

De Gier was appointed head coach of Go Ahead Eagles in June 2019.

He was appointed as manager of FC Den Bosch on 1 February 2021. On 6 March 2023, De Gier's contract with Den Bosch was terminated by mutual consent.

== Personal life ==
De Gier has his own company and football school in Nijverdal.
