= Wil Boessen =

Dutch footballer and manager

Personal information
- Date of birth: 3 May 1964 (age 62)
- Place of birth: Sittard, Netherlands

Team information
- Current team: Fortuna Sittard (assistant manager)

Senior career*
| Years | Team | Apps | (Gls) |
| 1983–1990 | Fortuna Sittard | 184 | (10) |
| 1990–1991 | SVV | 28 | (0) |
| 1991–1992 | Dordrecht '90 | 43 | (1) |
| 1993 | De Graafschap | 9 | (0) |
| 1993–1996 | Fortuna Sittard | 86 | (2) |
| 1997–1999 | Helmond Sport | 47 | (2) |
| Total | | 397 | (15) |

International career
| 1984-1986 | Netherlands U-21 | 9 | (0) |
| 1986-1987 | Netherlands U-23 | 3 | (0) |

Managerial career
- 2010–2012: VVV-Venlo (assistant)
- 2011: VVV-Venlo (caretaker)
- 2011–2012: VVV-Venlo (caretaker)
- 2012–2014: Fortuna Sittard
- 2014–2015: FC Oss
- 2015: Chiangmai
- 2016: Lampang
- 2017–2019: FC Den Bosch
- 2019–2022: Helmond Sport
- 2022–2023: Jong PSV (assistant)
- 2023–2024: Jong PSV
- 2024–: Fortuna Sittard (assistant)
- * Club domestic league appearances and goals

Wil Boessen (born 3 May 1964) is a Dutch football manager and a former player who is an assistant manager of Fortuna Sittard.

== Playing career ==
=== Club ===
Born in Sittard, Boessen played a large part of his career for local side Fortuna Sittard. He moved to SVV in 1990 and experienced their merger with Dordrecht '90 a year later. He also had spells at De Graafschap and Helmond Sport.

=== International ===
Boessen played 9 games for the Netherlands national under-21 football team and another 3 for the Olympic team.

== Managerial career ==
After retiring as a player, Boessen became assistant at VVV-Venlo and took temporarily charge twice during 10 seasons at the club just to be appointed by Fortuna in 2012. He moved to FC Oss in 2014.

He was manager of Lampang in the Thai Division 1 League and became manager of FC Den Bosch in summer 2017.

On 4 June 2019, he was appointed manager of Helmond Sport. Boessen was dismissed by Helmond Sport on 14 February 2022.

Before the 2022–23 season, Boessen was hired by Jong PSV as an assistant coach to Adil Ramzi.

After Ramzi left PSV, Boessen was appointed head coach of Jong PSV on 4 August 2023.
