= 2024–25 SC Cambuur season =

Dutch football club season

SC Cambuur
2024–25 season
- Stadium: Kooi Stadion
- Eerste Divisie: 3rd
- KNVB Cup: 2nd round
- Top goalscorer: League: Remco Balk (17); All: Remco Balk (17)
- Highest home attendance: 14,280 (Week 32)
- Lowest home attendance: 11,256 (Week 20)
- Average home league attendance: 12,791
- Biggest win: 6-0 SBV Vitesse (a) Week 15
- Biggest defeat: 4-1 (FC Volendam (a) Week 31 & RKC Waalwijk (a) promotion play-offs 1st round); 3-0 FC Emmen (a) week 33

The 2024–25 season marked SC Cambuur’s 51st season in the Eerste Divisie (2nd consecutive). The club finished the regular league season in 3rd place.

SC Cambuur also competed in the KNVB Cup, reaching 2nd round and eliminated following a 4–1 extra-time loss to RKC Waalwijk.

Remco Balk was the club’s top scorer during the season, scoring all his 17 goals in Eerste Divisie competitions.

Remco Balk also made the most appearances for the club, featuring 41 times in total, with 37 appearances in the league, 2 appearances in the promotion play-off games and 2 in the KNVB Cup.

== Players ==
=== First-team squad ===
As of 27 January 2025

Note: Flags indicate national team as defined under FIFA eligibility rules; some limited exceptions apply. Players may hold more than one non-FIFA nationality.

| No. | Pos. | Nation | Player |
|---|---|---|---|
| 1 | GK | NED | Thijs Jansen |
| 2 | DF | NED | Gabi Caschili |
| 3 | DF | NED | Floris Smand |
| 5 | DF | NED | Thomas Poll |
| 6 | DF | NED | Jeremy van Mullem |
| 7 | FW | NED | Remco Balk |
| 8 | MF | NED | Maikel Kieftenbeld |
| 9 | FW | IRL | Jonathan Afolabi |
| 9 | FW | NED | Milan Smit |
| 10 | MF | NED | Fedde de Jong |
| 11 | FW | NED | Ilias Alhaft |
| 11 | FW | NED | Silvester van der Water |
| 12 | MF | NED | Mark Diemers |
| 14 | DF | ESP | Arnau Casas |
| 15 | DF | NOR | Sturla Ottesen |
| 16 | DF | FIN | Tomas Galvez |

| No. | Pos. | Nation | Player |
|---|---|---|---|
| 17 | MF | NED | Matthias Nartey |
| 18 | MF | GER | Tony Rölke |
| 19 | FW | NED | Michael de Leeuw |
| 20 | DF | NED | Bryant Nieling |
| 22 | GK | NED | Daan Reiziger |
| 25 | DF | NED | Bram Marsman |
| 26 | DF | CUW | Tyrique Mercera |
| 28 | MF | NED | Nicky Souren |
| 29 | FW | BEL | Benjamin Pauwels |
| 33 | DF | NED | Amar Bakkati |
| 33 | DF | NED | Jelte Priem |
| 36 | MF | NED | Daan Visser |
| 41 | FW | NED | Iwan Henstra |
| 44 | MF | NED | Steyn Potma |
| 49 | FW | NED | Wiebe Kooistra |
| 99 | FW | SUR | Jeredy Hilterman |

== Transfers ==
=== In ===
| Pos. | Player | Transferred from | Fee | Date |
|---|---|---|---|---|
| DF | (Netherlands) Bryant Nieling | (Netherlands) Fortuna Sittard U21 | | 1 July 2024 |
| FW | (Belgium) Benjamin Pauwels | (Belgium) K. Beerschot V.A.C. | | 1 July 2024 |
| FW | (Netherlands) Michael de Leeuw | (Netherlands) Willem II Tilburg | Free | 1 July 2024 |
| MF | (Curaçao) Nicky Souren | (Netherlands) MVV Maastricht | Free | 1 July 2024 |
| MF | (Germany) Tony Rölke | (Germany) Hertha BSC II | Free | 2 July 2024 |
| GK | (Netherlands) Thijs Jansen | (Netherlands) Feyenoord | €150,000 | 19 July 2024 |
| MF | (Spain) Arnau Casas | (Norway) Sarpsborg 08 FF | Free | 8 August 2024 |
| MF | (Netherlands) Maikel Kieftenbeld | (Netherlands) FC Emmen | Free | 13 August 2024 |
| FW | (Republic of Ireland) Jonathan Afolabi | (Belgium) K.V. Kortrijk | On loan | 2 September 2024 |
| MF | (Netherlands) Mark Diemers | (Cyprus) AEK Larnaca FC | Free | 2 September 2024 |
| FW | (Netherlands) Ilias Alhaft | No club | | 3 September 2024 |
| DF | (Finland) Tomas Galvez | England Manchester City U21 | On loan | 12 January 2025 |
| FW | (Suriname) Jeredy Hilterman | (Germany) Arminia Bielefeld | On loan | 27 January 2025 |

=== Out ===
| Pos. | Player | Transferred to | Fee | Date |
|---|---|---|---|---|
| DF | (Netherlands) Chima Anyasi | No club | | 1 July 2024 |
| DF | (Haiti) Jhondly van der Meer | No club | | 1 July 2024 |
| DF | (Netherlands) Marco Tol | No club | | 1 July 2024 |
| FW | (Netherlands) Michael Breij | (Romania) Sepsi OSK Sfântu Gheorghe | Free | 1 July 2024 |
| DF | (Netherlands) Milan de Koe | (Netherlands) VV Staphorst | Free | 1 July 2024 |
| DF | (Netherlands) Vito Wormgoor | (Netherlands) VV DOVO | Free | 1 July 2024 |
| GK | (Netherlands) Yanick van Osch | (Netherlands) RKC Waalwijk | | 1 July 2024 |
| FW | (Latvia) Roberts Uldrikis | (Greece) Athens Kallithea F.C. | Free | 3 July 2024 |
| FW | (Italy) Youns El Hilali | No club | | 9 July 2024 |
| MF | (Netherlands) Vincent Pichel | (Netherlands) Be Quick 1887 | Free | 31 July 2024 |
| MF | (Netherlands) Daniël van Kaam | (Netherlands) Heracles Almelo | €200,000 | 2 August 2024 |
| MF | (Netherlands) Tom van der Werff | (Netherlands) TOP Oss | Free | 7 August 2024 |
| DF | (Guinea) Sekou Sylla | (Netherlands) ADO Den Haag | Free | 8 August 2024 |
| DF | (Netherlands) Leon Bergsma | (Finland) AC Oulu | | 26 August 2024 |
| FW | (United States) Agustin Anello | (Uruguay) Boston River | | 31 August 2024 |

== Competitions ==
=== Overall record ===
| Competition | First match | Last match | Starting round | Final position | Record | | | | | | | |
| Competition | First match | Last match | Starting round | Final position | Pld | W | D | L | GF | GA | GD | Win % |
|---|---|---|---|---|---|---|---|---|---|---|---|---|
| Eerste Divisie | 9 August 2024 | 9 May 2025 | Week 1 | 3rd | 38 | 22 | 5 | 11 | 63 | 42 | +21 | 57.89 |
| Promotion play-offs | 12 May 2025 | 16 May 2025 | 1st round | 1st round | 2 | 0 | 1 | 1 | 1 | 2 | −1 | 0.00 |
| KNVB Cup | 29 October 2024 | 17 December 2024 | 1st round | 2nd round | 2 | 1 | 0 | 1 | 5 | 5 | +0 | 50.00 |
| Total | | | | | 42 | 23 | 6 | 13 | 69 | 49 | +20 | 54.76 |

Source: ESPN

=== Eerste Divisie ===
==== League table ====
| Pos | Team | Pld | W | D | L | GF | GA | GD | Pts | Promotion or qualification |
|---|---|---|---|---|---|---|---|---|---|---|
| 1 | Volendam (Note: Winner of the Second Period (Rounds 10–19)) (C, P) | 38 | 26 | 4 | 8 | 87 | 48 | +39 | 82 | Promotion to the Eredivisie |
| 2 | Excelsior (Note: Winner of the Fourth Period (Rounds 30–38)) (P) | 38 | 22 | 8 | 8 | 74 | 38 | +36 | 74 | Promotion to the Eredivisie |
| 3 | Cambuur | 38 | 22 | 5 | 11 | 63 | 42 | +21 | 71 | Qualification for promotion play-offs |
| 4 | ADO Den Haag (Note: Winner of the Third Period (Rounds 20–29)) | 38 | 20 | 10 | 8 | 69 | 47 | +22 | 70 | Qualification for promotion play-offs |
| 5 | Dordrecht | 38 | 20 | 8 | 10 | 69 | 46 | +23 | 68 | Qualification for promotion play-offs |

Source: Flashscore, Keuken Kampioen Divisie (in Dutch)
Rules for classification: Season in progress: 1) Most points won; 2) Less points lost; 3) Goal difference; 4) Goals scored; 5) Alphabetical order; End of season: 1) Points; 2) Goal difference; 3) Goals scored; 4) Head-to-head points; 5) Head-to-head goal difference; 6) Head-to-head away goals scored; 7) Play-off if relevant for deciding champion, relegation or participating in a European league, otherwise by draw. 8) Penalty shoot-out (only after a play-off)
(C) Champions; (P) Promoted

==== Results summary ====
| Overall | | | | | | | | Home | | | | | | Away | | | | | |
| Pld | W | D | L | GF | GA | GD | Pts | W | D | L | GF | GA | GD | W | D | L | GF | GA | GD |
|---|---|---|---|---|---|---|---|---|---|---|---|---|---|---|---|---|---|---|---|
| 38 | 22 | 5 | 11 | 63 | 42 | +21 | 71 | 11 | 2 | 6 | 27 | 18 | +9 | 11 | 3 | 5 | 36 | 24 | +12 |

Last updated: 9 January 2026.
Source: ESPN

==== Results by round ====
| Round | 1 | 2 | 3 | 4 | 5 | 6 | 7 | 8 | 9 | 10 | 11 | 12 | 13 | 14 | 15 | 16 | 17 | 18 | 19 | 20 | 21 | 22 | 23 | 24 | 25 | 26 | 27 | 28 | 29 | 30 | 31 | 32 | 33 | 34 | 35 | 36 | 37 | 38 |
|---|---|---|---|---|---|---|---|---|---|---|---|---|---|---|---|---|---|---|---|---|---|---|---|---|---|---|---|---|---|---|---|---|---|---|---|---|---|---|
| Ground | A | H | A | A | H | H | A | H | A | H | H | A | A | H | A | H | A | H | A | H | H | A | A | H | A | H | A | H | A | H | A | H | A | H | A | H | A | A |
| Result | W | L | L | L | L | D | W | L | W | L | W | W | W | W | W | L | D | W | W | L | W | W | L | W | W | D | D | W | W | W | L | W | L | W | D | W | W | W |
| Position | | | | | | | | | | | | | | | | | | | | | | | | | | | | | | | | | | | | | | 3 |

Updated to match(es) played on 25 April 2025. Source: ESPN
A = Away; H = Home; W = Win; D = Draw; L = Loss

=== Matches ===
==== 1st half ====
| 9 August 2024 1st week | MVV Maastricht | 0-1 | SC Cambuur | Maastricht |
| 20:00 | | Report | Milan Smit 70' | Stadium: De Geusselt; Attendance: 5,049; Referee: Stan Teuben |

| 18 August 2024 2nd week | SC Cambuur | 0-1 | Helmond Sport | Leeuwarden |
| 12:15 | | Report | Dario Sits 25' | Stadium: Kooi Stadion; Attendance: 13,150; Referee: Allard Lindhout |

| 23 August 2024 3rd week | TOP Oss | 1-0 | SC Cambuur | Oss |
| 20:00 | Giovanni Korte 65' | Report | | Stadium: Frans Heesen Stadion; Attendance: 2,002; Referee: Martin van den Kerkhof |

| 30 August 2024 4th week | FC Dordrecht | 2-0 | SC Cambuur | Dordrecht |
| 20:00 | Devin Haen 14'; Joep van der Sluijs 17' | Report | | Stadium: Stadion Krommedijk; Attendance: 2,526; Referee: Laurens Gerrets |

| 13 September 2024 5th week | SC Cambuur | 0-1 | Jong Ajax | Leeuwarden |
| 20:00 | | Report | Jorthy Mokio 51' | Stadium: Kooi Stadion; Attendance: 13,250; Referee: Kevin Puts |

| 16 September 2024 6th week | SC Cambuur | 0-0 | Roda JC Kerkrade | Leeuwarden |
| 20:00 | | Report | | Stadium: Kooi Stadion; Attendance: 12,320; Referee: Ingmar Oostrom |

| 23 September 2024 7th week | Jong FC Utrecht | 0-4 | SC Cambuur | Utrecht |
| 20:00 | | Report | Jonathan Afolabi 30' (pen.); Tyrique Mercera 53' 82'; Fedde de Jong 72' | Stadium: Stadion Galgenwaard; Attendance: 522; Referee: Stan Teuben |

| 29 September 2024 8th week | SC Cambuur | 1-3 | FC Emmen | Leeuwarden |
| 16:45 | Benjamin Pauwels 44' | Report | Torben Rhein 24'; Jalen Hawkins 33'; Kelian Nsona Wa Saka 45' | Stadium: Kooi Stadion; Attendance: 13,554; Referee: Jannick van der Laan |

| 4 October 2024 9th week | VVV-Venlo | 0-1 | SC Cambuur | Venlo |
| 20:00 | | Report | Thomas Poll 44' | Stadium: De Koel; Attendance: 4,526; Referee: Luuk Timmer |

| 18 October 2024 10th week | SC Cambuur | 1-2 | FC Volendam | Leeuwarden |
| 20:00 | Michael de Leeuw 53' (pen.) | Report | Robert Mühren 24'; Brandley Kuwas 90+2' | Stadium: Kooi Stadion; Attendance: 13,472; Referee: Stan Teuben |

| 21 October 2024 11th week | SC Cambuur | 2-0 | FC Eindhoven | Leeuwarden |
| 20:00 | Remco Balk 11'; Michael de Leeuw 52' (pen.) | Report | | Stadium: Kooi Stadion; Attendance: 12,114; Referee: Alex Bos |

| 26 October 2024 12th week | Excelsior Rotterdam | 0-1 | SC Cambuur | Rotterdam |
| 16:30 | | Report | Remco Balk 35' | Stadium: Stadion Woudestein; Attendance: 4,500; Referee: Marc Nagtegaal |

| 1 November 2024 13th week | Jong AZ | 2-3 | SC Cambuur | The Hague |
| 20:00 | Ro-Zangelo Daal 45+2' (pen.); Julian Oerip 55' | Report | Matthias Nartey 36'; Remco Balk 73'; Tyrique Mercera 79' | Stadium: AFAS Trainingscomplex; Attendance: 702; Referee: Rick Sturm |

| 8 November 2024 14th week | SC Cambuur | 1-0 | Jong PSV | Leeuwarden |
| 20:00 | Remco Balk 10' | Report | | Stadium: Kooi Stadion; Attendance: 12,322; Referee: Luuk Timmer |

| 22 November 2024 15th week | SBV Vitesse | 0-6 | SC Cambuur | Arnhem |
| 20:00 | | Report | Remco Balk 14'; Ilias Alhaft 15'; Thomas Poll 37'; Benjamin Pauwels 42'; Anass Zarrouk 82' (o.g.); Tony Rölke 90+3' | Stadium: Gelredome; Attendance: 15,669; Referee: Robin Vereijken |

| 26 November 2024 16th week | SC Cambuur | 1-2 | FC Den Bosch | Leeuwarden |
| 20:00 | Mark Diemers 60' | Report | Vieri Kotzebue 7'; Byron Burgering 81' | Stadium: Kooi Stadion; Attendance: 11,772; Referee: Edwin van de Graaf |

| 29 November 2024 17th week | SC Telstar | 2-2 | SC Cambuur | Velsen-Zuid |
| 20:00 | Youssef El Kachati 15' 32' | Report | Mark Diemers 45+1'; Remco Balk 90+1' | Stadium: BUKO Stadion; Attendance: 2,700; Referee: Martin Fernando Perezlindo |

| 7 December 2024 18th week | SC Cambuur | 2-1 | ADO Den Haag | Leeuwarden |
| 16:30 | Jeremy van Mullem 22'; Michael de Leeuw 80' (pen.) | Report | Lee Bonis 73' | Stadium: Kooi Stadion; Attendance: 12,384; Referee: Martin van den Kerkhof |

| 13 December 2024 19th week | De Graafschap | 0-2 | SC Cambuur | Doetinchem |
| 20:00 | | Report | Rowan Besselink 24' (o.g.); Mark Diemers 89' | Stadium: De Vijverberg; Attendance: 10,865; Referee: Ingmar Oostrom |

| 20 December 2024 20th week | SC Cambuur | 0-2 | Jong AZ | Leeuwarden |
| 20:00 | | Report | Ro-Zangelo Daal 82'; Sem van Duijn 90+1' | Stadium: Kooi Stadion; Attendance: 11,256; Referee: Laurens Gerrets |

==== 2nd half ====
| 17 January 2025 21st week | SC Cambuur | 1-0 | Excelsior Rotterdam | Leeuwarden |
| 20:00 | Matthias Nartey 43' | Report | | Stadium: Kooi Stadion; Attendance: 12,117; Referee: Erwin Blank |

| 20 January 2025 22nd week | Roda JC Kerkrade | 0-1 | SC Cambuur | Kerkrade |
| 20:00 | | Report | Mark Diemers 88' | Stadium: Parkstad Limburg Stadion; Attendance: 6,238; Referee: Martijn Vos |

| 24 January 2025 23rd week | FC Eindhoven | 4-2 | SC Cambuur | Eindhoven |
| 20:00 | Achraf El Bouchataoui 18'; Evan Rottier 25' 64'; Sven Blummel 54' | Report | Tony Rölke 12'; Matthias Nartey 38' | Stadium: Jan Louwers Stadion; Attendance: 2,489; Referee: Robin Hensgens |

| 31 January 2025 24th week | SC Cambuur | 2-1 | SC Telstar | Leeuwarden |
| 20:00 | Tony Rölke 51'; Michael de Leeuw 77' | Report | Youssef El Kachati 39' | Stadium: Kooi Stadion; Attendance: 12,233; Referee: Martin Fernando Perezlindo |

| 10 February 2025 25th week | Jong PSV | 1-4 | SC Cambuur | Eindhoven |
| 20:00 | Robin van Duiven 51' | Report | Remco Balk 13' 18' 76'; Fedde de Jong 90+4' | Stadium: De Herdgang; Attendance: 403; Referee: Clay Ruperti |

| 14 February 2025 26th week | SC Cambuur | 1-1 | TOP Oss | Leeuwarden |
| 20:00 | Remco Balk 90+2' | Report | Jeremy van Mullem 90+5' (o.g.) | Stadium: Kooi Stadion; Attendance: 11,483; Referee: Kevin Puts |

| 24 February 2025 27th week | Jong Ajax | 1-1 | SC Cambuur | Duivendrecht |
| 20:00 | Precious Ugwu 55' | Report | Jeredy Hilterman 63' | Stadium: Sportpark De Toekomst; Attendance: 623; Referee: Clay Ruperti |

| 28 February 2025 28th week | SC Cambuur | 5-0 | VVV-Venlo | Leeuwarden |
| 20:00 | Mark Diemers 19'; Remco Balk 39' 87'; Bryant Nieling 67'; Jonathan Afolabi 81' | Report | | Stadium: Kooi Stadion; Attendance: 11,733; Referee: Klass Clerkx |

| 7 March 2025 29th week | FC Den Bosch | 0-2 | SC Cambuur | Den Bosch |
| 20:00 | | Report | Remco Balk 39'; Benjamin Pauwels 32' | Stadium: De Vliert; Attendance: 5,408; Referee: Robin Hensgens |

| 10 March 2025 30th week | SC Cambuur | 1-0 | FC Dordrecht | Leeuwarden |
| 20:00 | Remco Balk 23' | Report | | Stadium: Kooi Stadion; Attendance: 12,315; Referee: Erwin Blank |

| 15 March 2025 31st week | FC Volendam | 4-1 | SC Cambuur | Volendam |
| 16:30 | Jamie Jacobs 6'; Henk Veerman 32'; Alex Plat 48'; Bilal Ould-Chikh 58' (pen.) | Report | Remco Balk 88' | Stadium: Kras Stadion; Attendance: 6,794; Referee: Sander Van Der Eijk |

| 28 March 2025 32nd week | SC Cambuur | 3-2 | De Graafschap | Leeuwarden |
| 20:00 | Jeredy Hilterman 19'; Remco Balk 52'; Michael de Leeuw 84' | Report | Arjen van der Heide 11'; Reuven Niemeijer 78' | Stadium: Kooi Stadion; Attendance: 14,280; Referee: Edwin Van de Graaf |

| 4 April 2025 33rd week | FC Emmen | 3-0 | SC Cambuur | Emmen |
| 20:00 | Kelian Nsona Wa Saka 40'; Jalen Hawkins 48' (pen.) 63' | Report | | Stadium: De Oude Meerdijk; Attendance: 8,326; Referee: Alex Bos |

| 13 April 2025 34th week | SC Cambuur | 3-1 | Jong FC Utrecht | Leeuwarden |
| 12:15 | Mark Diemers 41' 56' (pen.); Ilias Alhaft 48' | Report | Massien Ghaddari 3' | Stadium: Kooi Stadion; Attendance: 14,118; Referee: Kevin Puts |

| 18 April 2025 35th week | Helmond Sport | 1-1 | SC Cambuur | Helmond |
| 20:00 | Sam Bisselink 21' | Report | Remco Balk 23' | Stadium: GS Staalwerken Stadion; Attendance: 3,056; Referee: Martijn Vos |

| 25 April 2025 36th week | SC Cambuur | 2-1 | SBV Vitesse | Leeuwarden |
| 20:00 | Tony Rölke 20' 39' | Report | Bryant Nieling 25' (o.g.) | Stadium: Kooi Stadion; Attendance: 14,080; Referee: Robin Hensgens |

| 2 May 2025 37th week | ADO Den Haag | 3-4 | SC Cambuur | The Hague |
| 20:00 | Lee Bonis 16'; Daryl van Mieghem 44'; Dano Lourens 89' | Report | Benjamin Pauwels 25'; Tony Rölke 30'; Jeredy Hilterman 71' (pen.); Ilias Alhaft 75' | Stadium: ADO Den Haag Stadium; Attendance: 12,246; Referee: Jeroen Manschot |

| 9 May 2025 38th week | SC Cambuur | 1-0 | MVV Maastricht | Leeuwarden |
| 20:00 | Tony Rölke 10' | Report | | Stadium: Kooi Stadion; Attendance: 13,830; Referee: Ingmar Oostrom |

==== Promotion Play-offs ====
| 12 May 2025 1st round 1st match | FC Den Bosch | 1-0 | SC Cambuur | Den Bosch |
| 20:00 | Konstantinos Doumtsios 20' | Report | | Stadium: De Vliert; Attendance: 6,289; Referee: Alex Bos |

| 16 May 2025 1st round 2nd match | SC Cambuur | 1-1 (a.e.t.) | FC Den Bosch | Leeuwarden |
| 20:00 | Mark Diemers 61' | Report | Sheddy Barglan 113' | Stadium: Kooi Stadion; Attendance: 14,027; Referee: Jannick van der Laan |

FC Den Bosch won 2–1 on aggregate.

=== KNVB Cup ===
| 29 October 2024 1st round | ADO Den Haag | 1-4 | SC Cambuur | The Hague |
| 21:00 | Lee Bonis 12' (pen.) | Report | Sturla Ottesen 25' 34'; Tyrique Mercera 71'; Wiebe Kooistra 83' | Stadium: ADO Den Haag Stadium; Attendance: 5,174; Referee: Jeroen Manschot |

| 17 December 2024 2nd round | RKC Waalwijk | 4-1 | SC Cambuur | Waalwijk |
| 20:00 | Oskar Zawada 14'; Silvester van der Water 52'; Yassin Oukili 73'; Faissal Al Mazyani 84' | Report | Tony Rölke 28' | Stadium: Mandemakers Stadion; Attendance: 3,127; Referee: Richard Martens |

== Statistics ==
=== Scorers ===
| # | Player | Eerste Divisie | Promotion Play-offs | KNVB | Total |
|---|---|---|---|---|---|
| 1 | (Netherlands) Remco Balk | 17 | 0 | 0 | 17 |
| 2 | (Netherlands) Mark Diemers | 7 | 1 | 0 | 8 |
| 2 | (Germany) Tony Rölke | 7 | 0 | 1 | 8 |
| 4 | (Netherlands) Michael de Leeuw | 5 | 0 | 0 | 5 |
| 5 | (Belgium) Benjamin Pauwels | 4 | 0 | 0 | 4 |
| 5 | (Curaçao) Tyrique Mercera | 3 | 0 | 1 | 4 |
| 7 | (Netherlands) Ilias Alhaft | 3 | 0 | 0 | 3 |
| 7 | (Suriname) Jeredy Hilterman | 3 | 0 | 0 | 3 |
| 7 | (Netherlands) Matthias Nartey | 3 | 0 | 0 | 3 |
| 10 | (Netherlands) Fedde de Jong | 2 | 0 | 0 | 2 |
| 10 | (Republic of Ireland) Jonathan Afolabi | 2 | 0 | 0 | 2 |
| 10 | (Netherlands) Thomas Poll | 2 | 0 | 0 | 2 |
| 10 | (Norway) Sturla Ottesen | 0 | 0 | 2 | 2 |
| 14 | (Netherlands) Bryant Nieling | 1 | 0 | 0 | 1 |
| 14 | (Netherlands) Jeremy van Mullem | 1 | 0 | 0 | 1 |
| 14 | (Netherlands) Milan Smit | 1 | 0 | 0 | 1 |
| 14 | (Netherlands) Wiebe Kooistra | 0 | 0 | 1 | 1 |

=== Appearances ===
| # | Player | Eerste Divisie | Promotion Play-offs | KNVB | Total |
|---|---|---|---|---|---|
| 1 | (Netherlands) Remco Balk | 37 | 2 | 2 | 41 |
| 2 | (Curaçao) Tyrique Mercera | 37 | 2 | 1 | 40 |
| 2 | (Netherlands) Jeremy van Mullem | 36 | 2 | 2 | 40 |
| 4 | (Netherlands) Thijs Jansen | 37 | 2 | 0 | 39 |
| 5 | (Netherlands) Nicky Souren | 35 | 1 | 2 | 38 |
| 6 | (Belgium) Benjamin Pauwels | 35 | 1 | 1 | 37 |
| 7 | (Netherlands) Bryant Nieling | 32 | 2 | 2 | 36 |
| 7 | (Netherlands) Mark Diemers | 32 | 2 | 2 | 36 |
| 9 | (Norway) Sturla Ottesen | 32 | 1 | 2 | 35 |
| 10 | (Netherlands) Matthias Nartey | 31 | 2 | 1 | 34 |
| 10 | (Netherlands) Thomas Poll | 31 | 2 | 1 | 34 |
| 10 | (Germany) Tony Rölke | 30 | 2 | 2 | 34 |
| 13 | (Netherlands) Michael de Leeuw | 27 | 2 | 2 | 31 |
| 14 | (Netherlands) Ilias Alhaft | 25 | 1 | 0 | 26 |
| 14 | (Netherlands) Fedde de Jong | 24 | 0 | 2 | 26 |
| 16 | (Netherlands) Maikel Kieftenbeld | 22 | 1 | 2 | 25 |
| 17 | (Finland) Tomas Galvez | 15 | 2 | 0 | 17 |
| 18 | (Republic of Ireland) Jonathan Afolabi | 14 | 0 | 0 | 14 |
| 18 | (Suriname) Jeredy Hilterman | 13 | 1 | 0 | 14 |
| 18 | (Spain) Arnau Casas | 12 | 0 | 2 | 14 |
| 18 | (Netherlands) Wiebe Kooistra | 11 | 1 | 2 | 14 |
| 22 | (Netherlands) Floris Smand | 9 | 2 | 0 | 11 |
| 23 | (Netherlands) Bram Marsman | 7 | 0 | 1 | 8 |
| 24 | (Netherlands) Silvester van der Water | 4 | 0 | 0 | 4 |
| 24 | (Netherlands) Steyn Potma | 4 | 0 | 0 | 4 |
| 26 | (Netherlands) Milan Smit | 3 | 0 | 0 | 3 |
| 26 | (Netherlands) Daan Visser | 2 | 1 | 0 | 3 |
| 26 | (Netherlands) Daan Reiziger | 1 | 0 | 2 | 3 |
| 29 | (Netherlands) Gabi Caschili | 2 | 0 | 0 | 2 |
| 30 | (Netherlands) Amar Bakkati | 1 | 0 | 0 | 1 |
| 30 | (Netherlands) Iwan Henstra | 0 | 1 | 0 | 1 |
| 30 | (Netherlands) Jelte Priem | 0 | 0 | 1 | 1 |

=== Clean sheets ===
| # | Player | Eerste Divisie |
|---|---|---|
| 1 | Thijs Jansen | 15 |

=== Disciplinary record ===
| # | Player | Eerste Divisie | | Promotion Play-offs | | KNVB | | Total | |
| # | Player | Booked | Sent off (straight red) | Booked | Sent off (straight red) | Booked | Sent off (straight red) | Booked | Sent off (straight red) |
|---|---|---|---|---|---|---|---|---|---|
| 1 | (Netherlands) Bryant Nieling | 6 | 1 | 1 | 0 | 0 | 0 | 7 | 1 |
| 2 | (Netherlands) Remco Balk | 9 | 0 | 1 | 0 | 0 | 0 | 10 | 0 |
| 3 | (Netherlands) Mark Diemers | 6 | 0 | 0 | 0 | 0 | 0 | 6 | 0 |
| 3 | (Netherlands) Michael de Leeuw | 6 | 0 | 0 | 0 | 0 | 0 | 6 | 0 |
| 5 | (Netherlands) Maikel Kieftenbeld | 4 | 0 | 1 | 0 | 0 | 0 | 5 | 0 |
| 5 | (Netherlands) Matthias Nartey | 5 | 0 | 0 | 0 | 0 | 0 | 5 | 0 |
| 5 | (Curaçao) Tyrique Mercera | 4 | 0 | 1 | 0 | 0 | 0 | 5 | 0 |
| 8 | (Norway) Sturla Ottesen | 3 | 0 | 0 | 0 | 1 | 0 | 4 | 0 |
| 8 | (Germany) Tony Rölke | 4 | 0 | 0 | 0 | 0 | 0 | 4 | 0 |
| 10 | (Suriname) Jeredy Hilterman | 2 | 0 | 1 | 0 | 0 | 0 | 3 | 0 |
| 10 | (Netherlands) Nicky Souren | 2 | 0 | 1 | 0 | 0 | 0 | 3 | 0 |
| 10 | (Netherlands) Thomas Poll | 2 | 0 | 1 | 0 | 0 | 0 | 3 | 0 |
| 13 | (Spain) Arnau Casas | 1 | 0 | 0 | 0 | 1 | 0 | 2 | 0 |
| 13 | (Netherlands) Jeremy van Mullem | 2 | 0 | 0 | 0 | 0 | 0 | 2 | 0 |
| 13 | (Netherlands) Wiebe Kooistra | 1 | 0 | 0 | 0 | 1 | 0 | 2 | 0 |
| 16 | (Belgium) Benjamin Pauwels | 1 | 0 | 0 | 0 | 0 | 0 | 1 | 0 |
| 16 | (Netherlands) Bram Marsman | 1 | 0 | 0 | 0 | 0 | 0 | 1 | 0 |
| 16 | (Netherlands) Daan Visser | 1 | 0 | 0 | 0 | 0 | 0 | 1 | 0 |
| 16 | (Netherlands) Floris Smand | 0 | 0 | 1 | 0 | 0 | 0 | 1 | 0 |
| 16 | (Netherlands) Ilias Alhaft | 1 | 0 | 0 | 0 | 0 | 0 | 1 | 0 |
| 16 | (Netherlands) Silvester van der Water | 1 | 0 | 0 | 0 | 0 | 0 | 1 | 0 |
| 16 | (Netherlands) Steyn Potma | 1 | 0 | 0 | 0 | 0 | 0 | 1 | 0 |
| 16 | (Netherlands) Thijs Jansen | 1 | 0 | 0 | 0 | 0 | 0 | 1 | 0 |
| 16 | (Finland) Tomas Galvez | 1 | 0 | 0 | 0 | 0 | 0 | 1 | 0 |
