= 2024–25 FC Dordrecht season =

FC Dordrecht
2024–25 season
- Manager: Melvin Boel
- Stadium: Stadion Krommedijk
- Eerste Divisie: 5th
- KNVB Cup: First round
- Top goalscorer: Devin Haen (12)
- Average home league attendance: 2,810
- Biggest win: Dordrecht 4–0 Helmond Sport; Dordrecht 4–0 VVV-Venlo
- Biggest defeat: Telstar 5–0 Dordrecht

In the 2024–25 season, FC Dordrecht competed in the Eerste Divisie, the second tier of Dutch football, for the tenth consecutive year, as well as in the KNVB Cup. By finishing in fifth place, the team qualified for the promotion play-offs for the second consecutive season.

== Transfers ==
=== In ===
Pos.	Player	Transferred from	Fee	Date	Source
MF	(Netherlands) Joep van der Sluijs	(Netherlands) Feyenoord U21	Free	4 July 2024	
DF	(Netherlands) Reda Akmum	(Netherlands) Jong Utrecht	Free	4 July 2024	
FW	(Netherlands) Devin Haen	(Netherlands) Feyenoord	Loan	4 July 2024	
DF	(Italy) Lorenzo Codutti	(Italy) Vado	Free	5 July 2024	
FW	(United States) Joshua Pynadath	(Netherlands) Jong AZ	Free	8 July 2024	
DF	(Netherlands) Chiel Olde Keizer	(Netherlands) Heracles Almelo	Free	18 July 2024	
GK	(Republic of Ireland) Liam Bossin	(Belgium) KV Oostende	Free	19 July 2024	
DF	(Gabon) Yannis M'Bemba	(France) FC Nantes B	Free	30 July 2024	
GK	(Latvia) Vladislavs Razumejevs	(Italy) Roma U20	Undisclosed	1 August 2024	
MF	(Netherlands) Brahim Darri	Unattached		1 August 2024	
MF	(Italy) Gabriele Parlanti	(Netherlands) Feyenoord U21	Loan	12 August 2024	
MF	(Netherlands) Jaden Slory	(Netherlands) Feyenoord U21	Loan	29 August 2024	
DF	(Togo) Augustin Drakpe	(Netherlands) Spakenburg	Undisclosed	15 January 2025	
MF	(Netherlands) Marouane Afaker	(Netherlands) IJsselmeervogels	Undisclosed	22 January 2025	
MF	(United States) Lawson Sunderland	(United States) Inter Miami	Free	29 January 2025	
FW	(Netherlands) Vieiri Kotzebue	(Netherlands) Den Bosch	Loan	30 January 2025	
FW	(Germany) Tom Sanne	(Germany) Hamburger SV	Loan	4 February 2025	
GK	(Netherlands) Mannou Berger	(Netherlands) Feyenoord	Loan	4 February 2025	

=== Out ===
Pos.	Player	Transferred to	Fee	Date	Source
FW	(Netherlands) Mauresmo Hinoke	(Netherlands) TOP Oss	Free	2 September 2024	
MF	(Netherlands) Brahim Darri	(Netherlands) VVV-Venlo	Free	9 January 2025	
DF	(Netherlands) Jop van der Avert	(South Korea) Cheongju	Undisclosed	21 January 2025	
GK	(Republic of Ireland) Liam Bossin	(Netherlands) Feyenoord	Free	23 January 2025	
MF	(United States) Korede Osundina	(Netherlands) Feyenoord U21	Loan return	30 January 2025	
MF	(Estonia) Rocco Robert Shein	(Norway) Fredrikstad	€800,000	30 January 2025	
FW	(Netherlands) Dean Zandbergen	(Netherlands) VVV-Venlo	Undisclosed	4 February 2025	

== Friendlies ==
29 June 2024	SV Oranje Wit (Netherlands)	1–6	(Netherlands) Dordrecht
17:00

6 July 2024	Dordrecht (Netherlands)	0–4	(Netherlands) Feyenoord
14:30

9 July 2024	sc Heerenveen (Netherlands)	4–1	(Netherlands) Feyenoord
17:45

13 July 2024	Dordrecht (Netherlands)	4–4	(Netherlands) Willem II
14:30

20 July 2024	Dordrecht (Netherlands)	0–1	(Belgium) Beveren
14:30

27 July 2024	Dordrecht (Netherlands)	1–0	(Qatar) Al-Shamal
12:00

27 July 2024	Dordrecht (Netherlands)	0–0	(Greece) Aris Thessaloniki
15:00

3 August 2024	Dordrecht (Netherlands)	1–0	(Saudi Arabia) Al Qadsiah
14:30

4 August 2024	Dordrecht (Netherlands)	3–1	(Belgium) Lommel
14:30

== Competitions ==
=== Eerste Divisie ===
==== League table ====
Pos	Team	Pld	W	D	L	GF	GA	GD	Pts	Promotion or qualification
3	Cambuur	38	22	5	11	63	42	+21	71	Qualification for promotion play-offs
4	ADO Den Haag (Note: Winner of the Third Period (Rounds 20–29))	38	20	10	8	69	47	+22	70	Qualification for promotion play-offs
5	Dordrecht	38	20	8	10	69	46	+23	68	Qualification for promotion play-offs
6	De Graafschap	38	19	8	11	73	50	+23	65	Qualification for promotion play-offs
7	Telstar (O, P)	38	17	10	11	69	47	+22	61	Qualification for promotion play-offs

Source: Flashscore, Keuken Kampioen Divisie (in Dutch)
Rules for classification: Season in progress: 1) Most points won; 2) Less points lost; 3) Goal difference; 4) Goals scored; 5) Alphabetical order; End of season: 1) Points; 2) Goal difference; 3) Goals scored; 4) Head-to-head points; 5) Head-to-head goal difference; 6) Head-to-head away goals scored; 7) Play-off if relevant for deciding champion, relegation or participating in a European league, otherwise by draw. 8) Penalty shoot-out (only after a play-off)
(O) Play-off winners; (P) Promoted

==== Results by round ====
Round	1	2	3	4	5	6	7	8	9	10	11	12	13	14	15	16	17	18	19	20	21	22	23	24	25	26	27	28	29	30	31	32	33	34	35	36	37	38
Ground	A	H	A	H	A	A	H	A	H	H	A	H	A	H	H	A	A	H	A	H	A	H	A	H	A	H	A	H	A	H	A	A	H	H	A	H	A	H
Result	W	D	L	W	L	D	D	W	W	D	W	W	L	W	D	L	W	W	W	D	L	D	W	D	W	W	W	W	L	W	L	L	W	W	L	W	L	W
Position	6	4	13	7	9	11	11	7	6	6	6	6	6	6	7	7	6	4	3	3	4	5	3	4	4	2	2	2	3	3	4	5	4	4	4	4	5	5

Source: Worldfootball
A = Away; H = Home; W = Win; D = Draw; L = Loss

==== Matches ====
The league fixtures were officially released on June 24, 2024.

9 August 2024 1	FC Emmen	1–2	Dordrecht	Emmen
				Stadium: De Oude Meerdijk

17 August 2024 2	Dordrecht	1–1	ADO Den Haag	Dordrecht
				Stadium: Stadion Krommedijk

26 August 2024 3	Jong AZ	3–1	Dordrecht	Alkmaar
				Stadium: AFAS Trainingscomplex

30 August 2024 4	Dordrecht	2–0	SC Cambuur	Dordrecht
				Stadium: Stadion Krommedijk

13 September 2024 6	FC Eindhoven	0–0	Dordrecht	Eindhoven
				Stadium: Jan Louwers Stadion

17 September 2024 5	FC Volendam	2–0	Dordrecht	Volendam
				Stadium: Kras Stadion

20 September 2024 7	Dordrecht	2–2	Excelsior	Dordrecht
				Stadium: Stadion Krommedijk

30 September 2024 8	Jong Ajax	0–1	Dordrecht	Amsterdam
				Stadium: Sportpark De Toekomst

4 October 2024 9	Dordrecht	2–0	Jong PSV	Dordrecht
				Stadium: Stadion Krommedijk

18 October 2024 11	VVV-Venlo	2–3	Dordrecht	Venlo
				Stadium: De Koel

22 October 2024 10	Dordrecht	2–2	Vitesse	Dordrecht
				Stadium: Stadion Krommedijk

25 October 2024 12	Dordrecht	3–1	Jong FC Utrecht	Dordrecht
				Stadium: Stadion Krommedijk

1 November 2024 13	De Graafschap	4–1	Dordrecht	Doetinchem
				Stadium: De Vijverberg

10 November 2024 14	Dordrecht	4–0	Helmond Sport	Dordrecht
				Stadium: Stadion Krommedijk

22 November 2024 16	MVV Maastricht	2–1	Dordrecht	Maastricht
				Stadium: De Geusselt

25 November 2024 15	Dordrecht	2–2	TOP Oss	Dordrecht
				Stadium: Stadion Krommedijk

1 December 2024 17	Den Bosch	2–3	Dordrecht	's-Hertogenbosch
				Stadium: De Vliert

6 December 2024 18	Dordrecht	3–2	SC Telstar	Dordrecht
				Stadium: Stadion Krommedijk

13 December 2024 19	Roda JC Kerkrade	0–1	Dordrecht	Kerkrade
				Stadium: Parkstad Limburg Stadion

20 December 2024 20	Dordrecht	3–3	FC Eindhoven	Dordrecht
				Stadium: Stadion Krommedijk

10 January 2025 21	Excelsior	1–0	Dordrecht	Rotterdam
				Stadium: Van Donge & De Roo Stadion

17 January 2025 22	Dordrecht	1–1	Jong AZ	Dordrecht
				Stadium: Stadion Krommedijk

24 January 2025 23	Vitesse	0–3	Dordrecht	Arnhem
				Stadium: GelreDome

31 January 2025 24	Dordrecht	1–1	De Graafschap	Dordrecht
				Stadium: Stadion Krommedijk

8 February 2025 25	Helmond Sport	0–1	Dordrecht	Helmond
				Stadium: GS Staalwerken Stadion

14 February 2025 26	Dordrecht	2–1	Roda JC Kerkrade	Dordrecht
				Stadium: Stadion Krommedijk

24 February 2025 27	Jong PSV	1–2	Dordrecht	Eindhoven
				Stadium: De Herdgang

28 February 2025 28	Dordrecht	3–0	FC Emmen	Dordrecht
				Stadium: Stadion Krommedijk

7 March 2025 29	SC Telstar	5–0	Dordrecht	Velsen
				Stadium: Sportpark Schoonenberg

10 March 2025 31	SC Cambuur	1–0	Dordrecht	Leeuwarden
				Stadium: Kooi Stadion

14 March 2025 30	Dordrecht	4–0	VVV-Venlo	Dordrecht
				Stadium: Stadion Krommedijk

30 March 2025 32	ADO Den Haag	2–1	Dordrecht	The Hague
				Stadium: Bingoal Stadion

4 April 2025 33	Dordrecht	3–0	Jong Ajax	Dordrecht
				Stadium: Stadion Krommedijk

12 April 2025 34	Dordrecht	4–0	Den Bosch	Dordrecht
				Stadium: Stadion Krommedijk

19 April 2025 35	TOP Oss	2–0	Dordrecht	Oss
				Stadium: Frans Heesen Stadion

25 April 2025 36	Dordrecht	3–0	MVV Maastricht	Dordrecht
				Stadium: Stadion Krommedijk

2 May 2025 37	Jong FC Utrecht	1–0	Dordrecht	Utrecht
				Stadium: Sportcomplex Zoudenbalch

9 May 2025 38	Dordrecht	4–1	FC Volendam	Dordrecht
				Stadium: Stadion Krommedijk

==== Promotion play-offs ====
===== Quarterfinals =====
13 May 2025 First leg	De Graafschap	0–0	Dordrecht	Doetinchem
				Stadium: De Vijverberg; Attendance: 10,012

17 May 2025 Second leg	Dordrecht	2–0 (2–0 agg.)	De Graafschap	Dordrecht
	Parlanti 68'; Slory 87'			Stadium: Stadion Krommedijk; Attendance: 4,100

===== Semifinals =====
21 May 2025 First leg	Dordrecht	2–1	Willem II	Dordrecht
18:45	Haen 18'; Valk 29'	Report	35' Meerveld	Stadium: Stadion Krommedijk; Referee: Rob Dieperink (Netherlands)

24 May 2025 Second leg	Willem II	v	Dordrecht	Tilburg
20:00				Stadium: Koning Willem II Stadion

=== KNVB Cup ===
29 October 2024 First round	Noordwijk	2–1	Dordrecht	Noordwijk
21:00		Report		Stadium: Sportpark Duinwetering; Attendance: 500; Referee: Luuk Timmer
