= 2026–27 FC Dordrecht season =

FC Dordrecht
2026–27 season
- Head coach: Paul Nuijten
- Stadium: Stadion Krommedijk
- Eerste Divisie: 18th
- KNVB Cup: First round
- Top goalscorer: League: Martin Vetkal; Ayoub Ouarghi; 3 goals each All: Martin Vetkal; Ayoub Ouarghi; 3 goals each
- Biggest win: 2–1 v Jong Ajax (H), 7 August 2026; 3–2 v Almere City (H), 25 September 2026; 1–0 v Jong PSV (A), 19 October 2026
- Biggest defeat: 6–1 v FC Volendam (A), 28 August 2026
- All statistics correct as of 6 November 2026.

The 2026–27 season is the 144th in the history of Football Club Dordrecht and the 12th consecutive season in the Eerste Divisie, the Dutch second tier. Dordrecht also took part in the KNVB Cup.

Head coach Dirk Kuyt left the club on 24 June 2026 to become an assistant coach at Fenerbahçe. Two days later, Dordrecht appointed Paul Nuijten as head coach on a two-season contract. Nuijten had finished the 2025–26 season as head coach of Jong Ajax. Captain Sem Valk left for Eredivisie club Telstar on 24 August.

Dordrecht opened the league season with a 2–1 home win over Jong Ajax on 7 August. On 28 August, they lost 6–1 away to FC Volendam. Henk Veerman scored four of Volendam's goals. Goalkeeper Calvin Raatsie injured his hand in a 2–1 defeat away to FC Eindhoven on 11 September. The club signed the free agent goalkeeper Yanick van Osch six days later. On 26 September, Dordrecht signed Dario Šits permanently from Parma. Ayoub Ouarghi was voted best talent of the first period on 16 October.

Dordrecht went out of the KNVB Cup in the first round on 28 October. They lost 3–2 away to SC Genemuiden.

== Transfers ==
=== In ===
Pos.	Player	Transferred from	Fee	Date	Source
DF	(Netherlands) Jaden Pinas	(Netherlands) Almere City	Free	1 July 2026	
DF	(Belgium) Beni Mpanzu	(Belgium) Cercle Brugge	Free	1 July 2026	
GK	(Netherlands) Calvin Raatsie	(Netherlands) Excelsior	Swap	17 July 2026	
DF	(Netherlands) Adil Lechkar	(Netherlands) Telstar	Free	19 July 2026	
MF	(Italy) Lorenzo Riccio	(Italy) Atalanta	Undisclosed	21 July 2026	
FW	(Argentina) Lucas Román	(Argentina) Independiente	Undisclosed	13 August 2026	
GK	(Netherlands) Yanick van Osch	Unattached	Free	17 September 2026	
FW	(Latvia) Dario Šits	(Italy) Parma	Undisclosed	26 September 2026	

=== Loans in ===
Pos.	Player	Loaned from	Start date	End date	Source
MF	(Morocco) Ayoub Ouarghi	(Netherlands) Feyenoord	1 July 2026	End of season	
DF	(Netherlands) Lucas Gardenier	(Netherlands) Feyenoord	1 July 2026	End of season	
FW	(Latvia) Dario Šits	(Italy) Parma	1 July 2026	26 September 2026	
MF	(South Korea) Bae Seung-gyun	(Netherlands) Feyenoord	16 July 2026	End of season	
DF	(Netherlands) Stan Henderikx	(Netherlands) Excelsior	2 September 2026	End of season	

=== Out ===
Pos.	Player	Transferred to	Fee	Date	Source
MF	(Netherlands) Daniel van Vianen	(Netherlands) Excelsior	Undisclosed	19 June 2026	
DF	(United States) John Hilton	Released	End of contract	30 June 2026	
FW	(Netherlands) Marouane Afaker	Released	End of contract	30 June 2026	
GK	(Netherlands) Tijn Baltussen	Released	End of contract	30 June 2026	
DF	(Italy) Lorenzo Codutti	Released	End of contract	30 June 2026	
DF	(Luxembourg) Mica Pinto	Released	End of contract	30 June 2026	
FW	(United States) Joshua Pynadath	Released	End of contract	30 June 2026	
GK	(Portugal) Celton Biai	(Netherlands) Excelsior	Swap	17 July 2026	
DF	(Netherlands) Sem Valk	(Netherlands) Telstar	Undisclosed	24 August 2026	
MF	(Netherlands) Joep van der Sluijs	(Netherlands) Helmond Sport	Free	26 August 2026	
MF	(United States) Lawson Sunderland	Released	Contract terminated	26 August 2026	
FW	(Sweden) Jayson Ezeb	Released	Contract terminated	4 September 2026	

== Pre-season and friendlies ==
27 June 2026 Friendly	Dordrecht (Netherlands)	3–0	(Germany) Schalke 04 II
12:00	22'; 66'; 84'

4 July 2026 Friendly	Dordrecht (Netherlands)	0–6	(Netherlands) Feyenoord
14:30			22'; 27'; 36' (pen.), 37'; 64'; 74'

25 July 2026 Friendly	Dordrecht (Netherlands)	2–2	(Saudi Arabia) Al-Khaleej
14:30

== Competitions ==
=== Overall record ===
Competition	First match	Last match	Starting round	Record							
Competition	First match	Last match	Starting round	Pld	W	D	L	GF	GA	GD	Win %
Eerste Divisie	7 August 2026		Matchday 1	0	0	0	0	0	0	+0	—
KNVB Cup				0	0	0	0	0	0	+0	—
Total				0	0	0	0	0	0	+0	—

Source: Competitions

=== Eerste Divisie ===
Pos	Team	Pld	W	D	L	GF	GA	GD	Pts	Promotion or qualification
16	TOP Oss	14	4	2	8	20	23	−3	14	
17	Helmond Sport	14	3	3	8	25	31	−6	12	
18	Dordrecht	14	3	3	8	18	34	−16	12	
19	Jong FC Utrecht	14	3	2	9	23	34	−11	11	Reserve teams are not eligible to be promoted to the Eredivisie
20	Eindhoven	14	3	2	9	18	31	−13	11	

Updated to match(es) played on 8 November 2026. Source: Flashscore, Keuken Kampioen Divisie (in Dutch)
Rules for classification: Season in progress: 1) Most points won; 2) Less points lost; 3) Goal difference; 4) Goals scored; 5) Head-to-head points; 6) Head-to-head goal difference; 7) Head-to-head goals scored 8) Head-to-head away goals scored 9) Alphabetical order; End of season: 1) Points; 2) Goal difference; 3) Goals scored; 4) Head-to-head points; 5) Head-to-head goal difference; 6) Head-to-head goals scored 7) Head-to-head away goals scored; 8) Extra match or series of matches 9) Goal difference (series of matches) 10) Goals scored (series of matches) 11) Penalty shoot-out (extra match or series of matches)
