= 2024–25 Eerste Divisie =

Eerste Divisie
- Season: 2024–25
- Dates: 9 August 2024 – 9 May 2025
- Champions: Volendam
- Promoted: Volendam; Excelsior; Telstar
- Matches: 380
- Goals: 1,146 (3.02 per match)
- Top goalscorer: Henk Veerman (26 goals)
- Biggest home win: Den Bosch 6–0 Jong AZ (16 August 2024); Telstar 6–0 Jong FC Utrecht (9 February 2025)
- Biggest away win: Vitesse 0–6 Cambuur (22 November 2024)
- Highest scoring: Jong PSV 6–4 Vitesse (20 December 2024)
- Longest winning run: 9 matches Volendam
- Longest unbeaten run: 15 matches Volendam
- Longest winless run: 13 matches Jong PSV
- Longest losing run: 8 matches Jong PSV

The 2024–25 Eerste Divisie was the 69th season of the Eerste Divisie, the second tier of football in the Netherlands since its establishment in 1956.

== Teams ==
A total of 20 teams took part in the league: 17 teams from the 2023–24 Eerste Divisie and 3 teams relegated from the 2023–24 Eredivisie.

Location of teams in the 2024–25 Eerste Divisie

=== Stadiums and locations ===
Club	Location	Venue	Capacity
ADO Den Haag	The Hague	Bingoal Stadion	15,000
Cambuur	Leeuwarden	Kooi Stadion	15,000
De Graafschap	Doetinchem	Stadion De Vijverberg	12,600
Den Bosch	's-Hertogenbosch	Stadion De Vliert	8,713
Dordrecht	Dordrecht	M-Scores Stadion	4,235
Eindhoven	Eindhoven	Jan Louwers Stadion	4,600
Emmen	Emmen	De Oude Meerdijk	8,600
Excelsior	Rotterdam	Van Donge & De Roo Stadion	4,500
Helmond Sport	Helmond	GS Staalwerken Stadion	3,600
Jong Ajax	Amsterdam	Sportpark De Toekomst	2,050
Jong AZ	Alkmaar	AFAS Trainingscomplex	200
Jong PSV	Eindhoven	PSV Campus De Herdgang	2,500
Jong FC Utrecht	Utrecht	Sportcomplex Zoudenbalch	550
MVV Maastricht	Maastricht	Stadion De Geusselt	10,000
Roda JC Kerkrade	Kerkrade	Parkstad Limburg Stadion	19,979
Telstar	Velsen	711 Stadion	3,060
TOP Oss	Oss	Frans Heesenstadion	4,560
Vitesse	Arnhem	GelreDome	21,248
Volendam	Volendam	Kras Stadion	7,384
VVV-Venlo	Venlo	Covebo Stadion - De Koel	8,000

=== Number of teams by provinces ===
Number of teams	Province	Team(s)
5	North Brabant	Den Bosch, Eindhoven, Helmond Sport, Jong PSV, TOP Oss
4	North Holland	Jong Ajax, Jong AZ, Telstar, Volendam
3	Limburg	MVV Maastricht, Roda JC Kerkrade, VVV-Venlo
3	South Holland	ADO Den Haag, Dordrecht, Excelsior
2	Gelderland	De Graafschap, Vitesse
1	Drenthe	Emmen
1	Friesland	Cambuur
1	Utrecht	Jong FC Utrecht

== Standings ==
=== League table ===
Pos	Team	Pld	W	D	L	GF	GA	GD	Pts	Promotion or qualification
1	Volendam (Note: Winner of the Second Period (Rounds 10–19)) (C, P)	38	26	4	8	87	48	+39	82	Promotion to the Eredivisie
2	Excelsior (Note: Winner of the Fourth Period (Rounds 30–38)) (P)	38	22	8	8	74	38	+36	74	Promotion to the Eredivisie
3	Cambuur	38	22	5	11	63	42	+21	71	Qualification for promotion play-offs
4	ADO Den Haag (Note: Winner of the Third Period (Rounds 20–29))	38	20	10	8	69	47	+22	70	Qualification for promotion play-offs
5	Dordrecht	38	20	8	10	69	46	+23	68	Qualification for promotion play-offs
6	De Graafschap	38	19	8	11	73	50	+23	65	Qualification for promotion play-offs
7	Telstar (O, P)	38	17	10	11	69	47	+22	61	Qualification for promotion play-offs
8	Emmen	38	17	5	16	56	53	+3	56	
9	Den Bosch (Note: Winner of the First Period (Rounds 1–9))	38	15	10	13	53	48	+5	55	Qualification for promotion play-offs
10	Jong AZ	38	14	10	14	69	63	+6	52	Reserve teams are not eligible to be promoted to the Eredivisie
11	Eindhoven	38	14	9	15	58	64	−6	51	
12	Roda JC Kerkrade	38	13	10	15	49	57	−8	49	
13	Helmond Sport	38	12	10	16	52	60	−8	46	
14	VVV-Venlo	38	11	8	19	43	69	−26	41	
15	MVV Maastricht	38	10	10	18	52	59	−7	40	
16	TOP Oss	38	8	14	16	31	60	−29	38	
17	Jong Ajax	38	9	9	20	37	52	−15	36	Reserve teams are not eligible to be promoted to the Eredivisie
18	Jong PSV	38	8	6	24	55	86	−31	30	Reserve teams are not eligible to be promoted to the Eredivisie
19	Jong FC Utrecht	38	4	11	23	31	82	−51	23	Reserve teams are not eligible to be promoted to the Eredivisie
20	Vitesse (Note: Vitesse were deducted six points for breaking the license requirements set by the Royal Dutch Football Association in September 2024, and were deducted another twenty-one points in November 2024 for multiple violations. In April 2025, Vitesse were deducted three points for withholding information. Later in April 2025, Vitesse was once again deducted three points due to late submission of required documentation, and another six points due to previous administrative shortcomings. These six points were drawn up in September 2024 as a conditional sanction, but were subsequently put into effect due to failure to comply with the set conditions. Vitesse appealed the decisions of the deductions of the final 12 points, and due to the decision of the rejection of the appeal coming after the end of the season, the penalty was instead moved to next season.)	38	11	11	16	54	73	−19	17	

Source: Flashscore, Keuken Kampioen Divisie (in Dutch)
Rules for classification: Season in progress: 1) Most points won; 2) Less points lost; 3) Goal difference; 4) Goals scored; 5) Alphabetical order; End of season: 1) Points; 2) Goal difference; 3) Goals scored; 4) Head-to-head points; 5) Head-to-head goal difference; 6) Head-to-head away goals scored; 7) Play-off if relevant for deciding champion, relegation or participating in a European league, otherwise by draw. 8) Penalty shoot-out (only after a play-off)
(C) Champions; (O) Play-off winners; (P) Promoted

== Results ==
Home \ Away	ADO	CAM	DBO	DOR	EIN	EMM	EXC	GRA	HEL	JAJ	JAZ	JPS	JUT	MVV	RJC	TEL	TOP	VIT	VOL	VVV
ADO Den Haag		3–4	2–1	2–1	2–1	2–1	0–5	1–2	3–1	1–0	0–3	3–2	1–1	2–0	3–0	1–1	1–0	2–0	2–1	1–1
Cambuur	2–1		1–2	1–0	2–0	1–3	1–0	3–2	0–1	0–1	0–2	1–0	3–1	1–0	0–0	2–1	1–1	2–1	1–2	5–0
Den Bosch	2–0	0–2		2–3	2–0	1–0	0–3	2–2	1–0	3–1	6–0	1–1	2–0	1–1	1–1	0–1	1–0	4–2	3–0	0–0
Dordrecht	1–1	2–0	4–0		3–3	3–0	2–2	1–1	4–0	3–0	1–1	2–0	3–1	3–0	2–1	3–2	2–2	2–2	4–1	4–0
Eindhoven	0–4	4–2	2–0	0–0		0–3	1–2	1–0	2–2	0–3	2–4	1–0	1–2	1–1	0–0	0–4	3–0	3–3	1–3	1–3
Emmen	0–1	3–0	0–3	1–2	1–2		1–1	3–0	0–0	4–2	1–4	4–2	2–0	1–1	1–3	0–1	2–0	3–3	1–2	2–1
Excelsior	1–0	0–1	3–1	1–0	2–0	2–0		3–1	1–1	2–0	4–2	5–0	3–0	3–2	1–1	3–2	2–0	1–3	0–0	4–0
De Graafschap	1–2	0–2	1–0	4–1	2–0	4–0	2–1		2–3	2–0	5–1	3–1	2–2	0–0	2–0	2–1	4–0	3–1	4–3	3–1
Helmond Sport	2–1	1–1	0–0	0–1	3–4	1–2	0–1	1–4		1–1	2–1	1–1	1–1	4–0	2–1	2–2	1–0	3–0	2–3	3–0
Jong Ajax	0–0	1–1	1–2	0–1	0–2	0–2	3–2	2–0	1–0		1–2	4–0	0–0	0–0	3–1	3–0	0–0	1–1	0–2	0–1
Jong AZ	3–3	2–3	0–0	3–1	2–3	1–1	2–1	2–2	2–3	2–1		2–2	5–1	2–3	6–1	1–2	1–1	0–1	0–1	3–0
Jong PSV	2–2	1–4	2–4	1–2	0–2	2–3	1–3	1–2	1–3	2–2	2–1		3–1	3–2	2–3	0–2	2–2	6–4	1–4	1–2
Jong FC Utrecht	1–1	0–4	0–3	1–0	0–4	1–2	0–0	1–1	3–1	1–2	0–1	0–2		4–3	1–3	1–1	1–1	0–2	2–3	0–0
MVV Maastricht	1–4	0–1	5–0	2–1	2–0	1–2	1–2	0–0	1–2	1–0	0–1	3–2	5–0		3–2	5–1	2–2	2–2	2–2	2–0
Roda JC Kerkrade	1–1	0–1	0–0	0–1	0–1	1–0	3–0	1–4	3–2	2–1	3–3	2–1	3–0	1–0		1–0	0–0	3–0	1–1	1–4
Telstar	1–1	2–2	0–0	5–0	0–3	3–0	1–3	2–2	3–0	3–0	0–0	1–0	6–0	4–0	3–1		3–2	1–0	2–2	4–0
TOP Oss	1–5	1–0	1–0	2–0	0–4	0–4	3–1	0–2	1–1	2–1	2–1	0–3	1–1	1–0	0–2	1–1		2–2	0–2	2–1
Vitesse	0–1	0–6	3–1	0–3	1–1	2–0	1–1	2–0	2–1	2–2	2–2	1–3	2–1	1–0	3–0	2–3	0–0		1–2	1–4
Volendam	1–2	4–1	3–2	2–0	4–1	0–1	1–4	2–1	3–1	3–0	2–0	4–0	2–0	3–1	3–2	3–0	4–0	4–0		2–4
VVV-Venlo	2–7	0–1	1–2	2–3	2–2	0–2	1–1	3–1	4–1	1–0	0–1	0–2	3–2	0–0	1–1	1–0	0–0	0–1	1–3	

Source: Flashscore
Legend: Blue = home team win; Yellow = draw; Red = away team win.

== Play-offs ==
All times Central European Summer Time (UTC+2)

=== Promotion/relegation play-offs ===
==== Bracket ====
First round
Dordrecht	0	2	2
De Graafschap	0	0	0
ADO Den Haag	0	0	0
Telstar	2	1	3
Cambuur	0	1	1
Den Bosch (a.e.t.)	1	1	2

Semi-finals
Willem II (p)	1	3	4 (5)
Dordrecht	2	2	4 (4)
Telstar (a.e.t.)	0	2	2
Den Bosch	0	1	1

Final
Willem II	2	1	3
Telstar	2	3	5

==== First round ====
12 May 2025
20:00

Den Bosch	1–0	Cambuur
Doumtsios 20'	Report

De Vliert, 's-Hertogenbosch
Attendance: 6,500
Referee: Alex Bos
16 May 2025
20:00

Cambuur	1–1 (a.e.t.)	Den Bosch
Diemers 61'	Report	Barglan 113'

Kooi Stadion, Leeuwarden
Attendance: 14,027
Referee: Jannick van der Laan

Den Bosch won 2–1 on aggregate.

13 May 2025
18:45

Telstar	2–0	ADO Den Haag
El Kachati 5'; Bakker 45+1'	Report

711 Stadion, Velsen-Zuid
Attendance: 4,177
Referee: Rob Dieperink
17 May 2025
16:30

ADO Den Haag	0–1	Telstar
	Report	El Kachati 71'

Bingoal Stadion, The Hague
Attendance: 8,793
Referee: Marc Nagtegaal

Telstar won 3–0 on aggregate.

13 May 2025
21:00

De Graafschap	0–0	FC Dordrecht
	Report

De Vijverberg, Doetinchem
Attendance: 12,600
Referee: Martijn Vos
17 May 2025
21:00

Dordrecht	2–0	De Graafschap
Parlanti 68'; Slory 87'	Report

M-Scores Stadion, Dordrecht
Attendance: 4,100
Referee: Robin Hensgens

Dordrecht won 2–0 on aggregate.

==== Semi-finals ====
20 May 2025
20:00

Den Bosch	0–0	Telstar
	Report

De Vliert, 's-Hertogenbosch
Attendance: 6,737
Referee: Allard Lindhout
23 May 2025
20:00

Telstar	2–1 (a.e.t.)	Den Bosch
El Kachati 30' (pen.); Bakker 109'	Report	Van Grunsven 18'

711 Stadion, Velsen-Zuid
Attendance: 4,077
Referee: Bas Nijhuis

Telstar won 2–1 on aggregate.

21 May 2025
18:45

Dordrecht	2–1	Willem II
Haen 19'; Valk 28'	Report	Meerveld 35'

M-Scores Stadion, Dordrecht
Attendance: 4,100
Referee: Rob Dieperink
24 May 2025
20:00

Willem II	3–2 (a.e.t.)	Dordrecht
St. Jago 3'; Mathijsen 7'; Lambert 43'	Report	Slory 16'; Ezeb 80'
Penalties
Vaesen (penalty scored); Sandra (penalty scored); Kaygin (penalty scored); Lambert (penalty scored); Bosch (penalty scored)	5–4	Schuurman (penalty scored); Kotzebue (penalty scored); Van der Sluijs (penalty scored); M'Bemba (penalty scored); Igor (penalty missed)

Koning Willem II Stadion, Tilburg
Attendance: 13,200
Referee: Dennis Higler

4–4 on aggregate. Willem II won 5–4 on penalties.

==== Final ====
29 May 2025
20:00

Telstar	2–2	Willem II
Sigurgeirsson 56' (o.g.); El Kachati 65'	Report	Meerveld 14'; Kehrer 81'

711 Stadion, Velsen-Zuid
Attendance: 4,177
Referee: Jeroen Manschot
1 June 2025
18:00

Willem II	1–3	Telstar
Nizet 17'	Report	Kaandorp 6', 58'; El Kachati 12'

Koning Willem II Stadion, Tilburg
Attendance: 14,500
Referee: Danny Makkelie

Telstar won 5–3 on aggregate.

== Statistics ==
=== Top scorers ===
As of 9 May 2025

Rank	Player	Club	Goals
1	(Netherlands) Henk Veerman	Volendam	26
2	(Morocco) Youssef El Kachati	Telstar	19
3	(Netherlands) Robert Mühren	Volendam	18
4	(Netherlands) Remco Balk	Cambuur	17
4	(Netherlands) Zakaria Eddahchouri	Telstar	17
6	(Netherlands) Ro-Zangelo Daal	Jong AZ	15
6	(Curaçao) Anthony van den Hurk	Helmond Sport	15
8	(Israel) Tai Abed	Jong PSV	14
9	(France) Kélian Nsona	Emmen	13
10	(Netherlands) Devin Haen	Dordrecht	12

== Attendances ==
Rank	Club	Average
1	SBV Vitesse	16,049
2	SC Cambuur	12,715
3	De Graafschap	10,724
4	ADO Den Haag	8,599
5	Roda JC	7,721
6	FC Emmen	7,606
7	FC Volendam	5,985
8	FC Den Bosch	5,722
9	VVV-Venlo	5,067
10	MVV Maastricht	4,592
11	Excelsior Rotterdam	3,448
12	Helmond Sport	2,855
13	FC Dordrecht	2,810
14	FC Eindhoven	2,751
15	SC Telstar	2,615
16	TOP Oss	2,168
17	Jong Ajax	772
18	Jong PSV	734
19	Jong AZ	673
20	Jong FC Utrecht	452

== See also ==
- 2024–25 Eredivisie
- 2024–25 Tweede Divisie
- 2024–25 Derde Divisie
