= Matthias Nartey =

Dutch footballer (born 2004)

Personal information
- Date of birth: 28 August 2004 (age 22)
- Place of birth: Leeuwarden, Netherlands
- Height: 1.85 m (6 ft 1 in)
- Position: Attacking midfielder

Team information
- Current team: IK Sirius
- Number: 8

Youth career
- –2015: LAC Frisia 1883
- 2015–2023: Cambuur

Senior career*
Years	Team	Apps	(Gls)
2023–2025	Cambuur	42	(3)
2025–	IK Sirius	14	(0)
- * Club domestic league appearances and goals as of 8 July 2026

Matthias Nartey (born 28 August 2004) is a Dutch professional footballer who plays as an attacking midfielder for Allsvenskan club IK Sirius.

== Career ==
=== Cambuur ===
Nartey began playing football with hometown club LAC Frisia 1883 in Leeuwarden before being scouted at the age of 11 by the city's professional club, Cambuur, where he progressed through the youth academy.

He made his professional debut for Cambuur's first team on 25 January 2024, replacing Léon Bergsma in the 69th minute of a KNVB Cup match against USV Hercules. He scored the equalising goal in the 82nd minute, assisted by Roberts Uldriķis, as the match finished 4–3 after extra time. Four days later, Nartey made his Eerste Divisie debut, coming on as a late substitute for Fedde de Jong in a 2–1 home defeat to TOP Oss. On 19 March, he signed his first professional contract with Cambuur, a three-year deal. On 5 April, he made his first start for Cambuur in a 2–0 home defeat to ADO Den Haag, coming into the starting line-up in place of the suspended Remco Balk.

During the 2024–25 season, he established himself as a regular starter under head coach Henk de Jong. During his two senior seasons with Cambuur, he scored four goals in 46 competitive appearances.

=== IK Sirius ===
On 27 August 2025, Nartey joined Swedish club IK Sirius, signing a five-year contract for an undisclosed fee. He made his debut for Sirius on 14 September, appearing as a 90th-minute substitute for Leo Walta in an Allsvenskan 3–0 home victory over GAIS.

== Personal life ==
Nartey has a Ghanaian father and a Dutch Frisian mother.

== Career statistics ==
As of match played 9 November 2025

Appearances and goals by club, season and competition
Club	Season	League			National cup		Other		Total	
Club	Season	Division	Apps	Goals	Apps	Goals	Apps	Goals	Apps	Goals
Cambuur	2023–24	Eerste Divisie	11	0	1	1	—		12	1
Cambuur	2024–25	Eerste Divisie	31	3	1	0	2 (Note: Appearances in Eredivisie promotion/relegation playoffs)	0	34	3
Cambuur	Total		42	3	2	1	2	0	46	4
IK Sirius	2025	Allsvenskan	6	0	0	0	—		6	0
Career total			48	3	2	1	2	0	52	4
