= List of Portuguese football transfers winter 2023–24 =

This is a list of Portuguese football transfers for the 2023–24 winter transfer window. Only transfers featuring Liga Portugal are listed.

== Liga Portugal ==
Note: Flags indicate national team as has been defined under FIFA eligibility rules. Players may hold more than one non-FIFA nationality.

=== Benfica ===
In:

No.	Pos.	Nation	Player
3	DF	ESP	Álvaro Carreras (on loan from (England) Manchester United, previously on loan at (Spain) Granada)
25	FW	ARG	Gianluca Prestianni (from (Argentina) Vélez Sarsfield)
32	FW	ARG	Benjamín Rollheiser (on loan from (Argentina) Estudiantes (LP))
36	FW	BRA	Marcos Leonardo (from (Brazil) Santos)

Out:

No.	Pos.	Nation	Player
13	DF	CZE	David Jurásek (to (Germany) TSG Hoffenheim)
17	FW	POR	Gonçalo Guedes (loan return to (England) Wolverhampton Wanderers)
22	MF	POR	Chiquinho (to (Greece) Olympiacos)
33	FW	CRO	Petar Musa (to (United States) FC Dallas)
38	DF	BRA	João Victor (to (Brazil) Vasco da Gama)
—	DF	BRA	Lucas Veríssimo (to (Qatar) Al-Duhail, previously on loan at (Brazil) Corinthians)
—	MF	BRA	Gabriel Pires (to (Brazil) Fluminense, previously on loan at (Brazil) Botafogo)
—	FW	POR	Gonçalo Ramos (to (France) Paris Saint-Germain, previously on loan)

=== Porto ===
In:

No.	Pos.	Nation	Player
31	DF	BRA	Otávio (from Famalicão)

Out:

No.	Pos.	Nation	Player
4	DF	ANG	David Carmo (on loan to (Greece) Olympiacos)
7	FW	BRA	Gabriel Veron (on loan to (Brazil) Cruzeiro)
21	FW	ESP	Fran Navarro (on loan to (Greece) Olympiacos)

=== Braga ===
In:

No.	Pos.	Nation	Player
10	MF	ITA	Cher Ndour (on loan from (France) Paris Saint-Germain)

Out:

No.	Pos.	Nation	Player
8	MF	LBY	Al-Musrati (to (Turkey) Beşiktaş)
10	MF	POR	André Horta (on loan to (Greece) Olympiacos)
88	MF	POR	André Castro (to Moreirense)
—	MF	BRA	Lucas Mineiro (to (Brazil) Cuiabá, previously on loan)

=== Sporting CP ===
In:

No.	Pos.	Nation	Player
45	DF	POR	Rafael Pontelo (from Leixões)
80	MF	FRA	Koba Koindredi (from Estoril)

Out:

No.	Pos.	Nation	Player
14	MF	POR	Dário Essugo (on loan to Chaves)
91	FW	POR	Rodrigo Ribeiro (on loan to (England) Nottingham Forest)
—	DF	POR	Rúben Vinagre (on loan to (Italy) Hellas Verona, previously on loan at (England) Hull City)
—	MF	ARG	Mateo Tanlongo (on loan to Rio Ave, previously on loan at (Denmark) Copenhagen)
—	FW	CPV	Jovane Cabral (on loan to (Greece) Olympiacos, previously on loan at (Italy) Salernitana)
—	MF	POR	Rochinha (to (Turkey) Kasımpaşa, previously on loan at (Qatar) Al-Markhiya)

=== Arouca ===
In:

No.	Pos.	Nation	Player
3	DF	BRA	Robson Bambu (on loan from (France) Nice, previously on loan at (Brazil) Vasco da Gama)
15	FW	BLR	Vladislav Morozov (from (Belarus) Dinamo Minsk)
25	DF	ALG	Yanis Hamache (free agent)

Out:

No.	Pos.	Nation	Player
18	FW	USA	Benji Michel (free agent)
30	FW	COD	André Bukia (to (Tunisia) Espérance de Tunis)
64	DF	POR	Rafael Fernandes (to (France) Lille)

=== Vitória Guimarães ===
In:

No.	Pos.	Nation	Player
37	FW	BRA	Kaio César (on loan from (Brazil) Coritiba)
79	FW	POR	Nélson Oliveira (from (Turkey) Konyaspor)

Out:

No.	Pos.	Nation	Player
7	FW	BRA	André Silva (to (Brazil) São Paulo)
9	FW	BRA	Alisson Safira (to Santa Clara)
20	FW	ANG	Nelson da Luz (on loan to (China) Qingdao West Coast)
30	FW	NGA	Clinton (to Tondela)
63	GK	GNB	Celton Biai (to (Netherlands) Dordrecht)
80	MF	POR	Dani Silva (to (Italy) Hellas Verona)
—	DF	POR	Hélder Sá (to Rio Ave, previously on loan at (Poland) Radomiak Radom)

=== Chaves ===
In:

No.	Pos.	Nation	Player
13	DF	POR	Vasco Fernandes (from Casa Pia)
14	MF	POR	Dário Essugo (on loan from Sporting CP)
40	DF	NGA	Junior Pius (from (Romania) Botoșani)
80	MF	POR	Raphael Guzzo (from (Brazil) Goiás)

Out:

No.	Pos.	Nation	Player
5	DF	MOZ	Bruno Langa (on loan to (Spain) Almería)
8	MF	POR	João Pedro (to (Romania) UTA Arad)
11	FW	GHA	Issah Abass (on loan to (Iran) Sepahan)
22	FW	POR	Rúben Lameiras (to Casa Pia)
24	DF	POR	Edu Borges (on loan to Trofense)
44	DF	POR	João Queirós (to Mafra)

=== Famalicão ===
In:

No.	Pos.	Nation	Player
19	MF	POR	Filipe Soares (on loan from (Greece) PAOK)
21	FW	FRA	Florian Danho (on loan from (Switzerland) Stade Lausanne Ouchy)
36	DF	BRA	Ian Custódio (from (Brazil) Palmeiras)
77	FW	BRA	Sorriso (on loan from (Brazil) Red Bull Bragantino)

Out:

No.	Pos.	Nation	Player
5	DF	POR	Rúben Lima (to Estrela Amadora)
13	DF	BRA	Otávio (to Porto)
17	FW	POR	Afonso Rodrigues (on loan to Paços Ferreira)
77	FW	POR	Pablo (on loan to Paços Ferreira)
—	DF	ARG	Hernán de la Fuente (to (Argentina) Huracán, previously on loan at (Argentina) Atlético Tucumán)

=== Boavista ===
In:

No.	Pos.	Nation	Player

Out:

No.	Pos.	Nation	Player
21	FW	POR	Tiago Morais (to (France) Lille)
27	FW	VEN	Jeriel De Santis (to (Peru) Alianza Lima)
30	FW	IRL	Cristiano Fitzgerald (to Estrela Amadora)
—	FW	POR	Manuel Namora (to Vianense, previously on loan at Leixões)

=== Casa Pia ===
In:

No.	Pos.	Nation	Player
7	FW	POR	Nuno Moreira (from Vizela)
9	FW	POR	André Lacximicant (on loan from Braga B)
10	FW	POR	Rúben Lameiras (from Chaves)
12	DF	FRA	Fahem Benaïssa-Yahia (from (France) Villefranche)
14	MF	NOR	Kevin Martin Krygård (from (Norway) Haugesund)
22	GK	POR	Daniel Azevedo (from Belenenses)

Out:

No.	Pos.	Nation	Player
13	DF	POR	Vasco Fernandes (to Chaves)
22	FW	ARM	Artur Serobyan (loan return to Ararat-Armenia)
44	DF	POR	Isaac Monteiro (on loan to Covilhã)
99	FW	BRA	Clayton (to (Brazil) Vasco da Gama)

=== Vizela ===
In:

No.	Pos.	Nation	Player
4	DF	POR	Jota Gonçalves (from Tondela)
9	FW	SRB	Sava Petrov (from (Serbia) Radnički Niš)
10	MF	POR	Domingos Quina (on loan from (Italy) Udinese)
11	FW	FRA	Amadou Ba-Sy (from (France) Dunkerque)
28	MF	POR	Bruno Costa (from (France) Valenciennes)
75	MF	BEL	Jason Lokilo (on loan from (England) Hull City)
99	FW	COD	Samuel Essende (from (France) Caen, previously on loan)

Out:

No.	Pos.	Nation	Player
3	DF	POR	Bruno Wilson (to (United States) San Jose Earthquakes)
7	FW	GNB	Jardel (on loan to (Poland) Radomiak Radom)
9	FW	ESP	Iker Unzueta (on loan to (Spain) Amorebieta)
12	MF	COL	Rafael Bustamante (loan return to (Colombia) Deportivo Cali)
16	MF	ALG	Houssem Mrezigue (loan return to (Algeria) Belouizdad)
32	DF	ARG	Joaquín Novillo (loan return to (Argentina) Belgrano)
79	FW	POR	Nuno Moreira (to Casa Pia)

=== Rio Ave ===
In:

No.	Pos.	Nation	Player
5	MF	ARG	Mateo Tanlongo (on loan from Sporting CP, previously on loan at (Denmark) Copenhagen)
7	MF	POR	João Teixeira (on loan from (Qatar) Al-Markhiya)
11	FW	POR	Umaro Embaló (on loan from (Netherlands) Fortuna Sittard, previously on loan at (Spain) Cartagena)
12	GK	POL	Cezary Miszta (on loan from (Poland) Legia Warsaw)
15	MF	POR	Adrien Silva (free agent)
24	DF	COL	Cristian Devenish (on loan from (Colombia) Atlético Nacional)
27	MF	GRE	Marios Vrousai (on loan from (Greece) Olympiacos)
28	DF	POR	Hélder Sá (from Vitória Guimarães, previously on loan at (Poland) Radomiak Radom)
39	MF	NED	Amine Rehmi (on loan from (Netherlands) TOP Oss)

Out:

No.	Pos.	Nation	Player
6	MF	POR	Guga (to (China) Beijing Guoan)
7	FW	POR	Hernâni (to (Saudi Arabia) Al-Najma)
9	FW	COL	Leonardo Ruiz (to (South Korea) Seongnam)
11	MF	POR	Bruno Ventura (on loan to Leixões)
75	DF	POR	Nuno Namora (to Oliveirense)

=== Gil Vicente ===
In:

No.	Pos.	Nation	Player
39	DF	ANG	Jonathan Buatu (from (France) Valenciennes)
67	DF	POR	Alex Pinto (from (Slovakia) DAC Dunajská Streda)
88	DF	BRA	Kazu (from Oliveirense)
90	FW	POR	Afonso Moreira (on loan from Sporting CP B)

Out:

No.	Pos.	Nation	Player
4	DF	POR	Né Lopes (to Torreense)
11	FW	BRA	Marlon (on loan to (Brazil) Guarani)
21	FW	CRO	Roko Baturina (on loan to (Spain) Racing Santander)

=== Estoril ===
In:

No.	Pos.	Nation	Player
6	DF	DEN	Frederik Winther (on loan from (Germany) FC Augsburg)
7	MF	BRA	Vinicius Zanocelo (on loan from (Brazil) Santos, previously on loan at (Brazil) Fortaleza)
13	DF	BRA	João Basso (on loan from (Brazil) Santos)
29	FW	SRB	Nemanja Jović (free agent)
83	MF	FRA	Koba Koindredi (from (Spain) Valencia, previously on loan)

Out:

No.	Pos.	Nation	Player
6	MF	POR	Alex Soares (free agent)
6	DF	DEN	Frederik Winther (loan return to (Germany) FC Augsburg)
7	FW	POR	Rodrigo Martins (to Portimonense)
25	FW	NGA	Bamidele Yusuf (to (Serbia) Radnički Niš)
28	MF	NED	Ivan Pavlić (free agent)
83	MF	FRA	Koba Koindredi (to Sporting CP)

=== Portimonense ===
In:

No.	Pos.	Nation	Player
4	DF	BRA	Thiago Dombroski (on loan from (Brazil) Coritiba)
5	MF	CMR	Stève Mvoué (from (Belgium) Seraing)
8	MF	JPN	Taichi Fukui (on loan from (Germany) Bayern Munich II)
9	FW	POR	Tamble Monteiro (from Felgueiras)
10	FW	CPV	Hildeberto Pereira (from (China) Henan)
70	FW	POR	Rodrigo Martins (from Estoril)

Out:

No.	Pos.	Nation	Player
8	MF	BRA	Maurício (free agent)
9	FW	POR	Paulinho (loan return to (Denmark) Viborg)
37	FW	BRA	Rildo (loan return to Santa Clara)
71	MF	ENG	Dennis Adeniran (to (Israel) Hapoel Petah Tikva)
—	MF	BRA	Lucas Fernandes (on loan to (Brazil) Cuiabá, previously on loan at (Brazil) Botafogo)
—	MF	BRA	Ewerton (to (Vietnam) Hanoi, previously on loan at (Japan) Vegalta Sendai)
—	FW	COL	Wilinton Aponzá (to (Moldova) Sheriff Tiraspol, previously on loan at (South Korea) Chungnam Asan)

=== Moreirense ===
In:

No.	Pos.	Nation	Player
3	DF	BRA	Carlos Henrique (from (Brazil) Ibrachina U20)
8	MF	POR	André Castro (from Braga)
9	FW	EQG	Luis Asué (from Braga B)
12	GK	POR	Mika (free agent)
32	FW	BRA	Vinícius Mingotti (from (Brazil) Athletico Paranaense, previously on loan at (Brazil) Bahia)
45	MF	POR	Miguel Rebelo (from Caldas)

Out:

No.	Pos.	Nation	Player
4	DF	POR	Rafael Santos (to Santa Clara)
8	MF	BRA	Wallisson (to (Brazil) Athletic-MG)
9	FW	BRA	André Luis (to (China) Shanghai Shenhua)

=== Farense ===
In:

No.	Pos.	Nation	Player

Out:

No.	Pos.	Nation	Player

=== Estrela Amadora ===
In:

No.	Pos.	Nation	Player
28	DF	POR	Rúben Lima (from Famalicão)
67	FW	IRL	Cristiano Fitzgerald (from Boavista)

Out:

No.	Pos.	Nation	Player

== See also ==
- 2023–24 Primeira Liga
