= Jeredy Hilterman =

Surinamese footballer

Personal information
- Date of birth: 20 June 1998 (age 28)
- Place of birth: Haarlem, Netherlands
- Height: 1.86 m (6 ft 1 in)
- Position: Forward

Team information
- Current team: Vitesse
- Number: 19

Youth career
- 2011–2013: EDO
- 2013–2015: AZ
- 2015–2017: Willem II

Senior career*
Years	Team	Apps	(Gls)
2017–2021	Jong FC Utrecht	98	(27)
2021	Utrecht	3	(0)
2021–2022	Emmen	20	(8)
2022	NAC	13	(2)
2022–2024	Almere City	36	(14)
2023–2024	→ Willem II (loan)	35	(16)
2024–2025	Arminia Bielefeld	3	(0)
2025	→ Cambuur (loan)	13	(3)
2025–2026	Arminia Bielefeld II	3	(0)
2026–	Vitesse	4	(0)

International career^{‡}
2022–	Suriname	8	(2)
- * Club domestic league appearances and goals as of 3 October 2026 ‡ National team caps and goals as of 8 June 2024

Jeredy Hilterman (born 20 June 1998) is a professional footballer who plays as a forward for Eerste Divisie club Vitesse. Born in the Netherlands, he plays for the Suriname national team.

== Club career ==
He made his Eerste Divisie debut for Jong FC Utrecht on 21 August 2017 in a game against FC Oss.

On 8 July 2021, he signed a two-year contract with Emmen.

On 31 January 2022, Hilterman joined NAC Breda until the summer of 2024. After six months, he joined Almere City on a two-year contract with an option for an additional year, signing the deal on 12 July 2022.

On 24 August 2023, Hilterman moved to Willem II on loan.

On 2 July 2024, Hilterman signed with Arminia Bielefeld in German 3. Liga. On 27 January 2025, he returned to the Netherlands and joined Cambuur on loan.

On 10 September 2026, Hilterman joined Vitesse until the end of the 2026–27 season, with an option for the 2027–28 season.

== International career ==
Hilterman debuted with the Surinamese national team in a friendly 1–0 loss to Thailand on 27 March 2022.

== Career statistics ==
=== Club ===
As of match played 24 August 2025

Appearances and goals by club, season and competition
Club	Season	League			National cup (Note: Includes KNVB Cup, DFB Pokal)		Other		Total	
Club	Season	Division	Apps	Goals	Apps	Goals	Apps	Goals	Apps	Goals
Jong FC Utrecht	2017–18	Eerste Divisie	32	2	—		—		32	2
Jong FC Utrecht	2018–19	Eerste Divisie	11	2	—		—		11	2
Jong FC Utrecht	2019–20	Eerste Divisie	19	4	—		—		19	4
Jong FC Utrecht	2020–21	Eerste Divisie	36	19	—		—		36	19
Jong FC Utrecht	Total		98	27	—		—		98	27
Utrecht	2020–21	Eredivisie	3	0	0	0	0	0	3	0
Emmen	2021–22	Eerste Divisie	20	8	2	0	—		22	8
NAC Breda	2021–22	Eerste Divisie	13	2	1	0	0	0	14	2
Almere City	2022–23	Eerste Divisie	36	14	2	0	5 (Note: Appearance(s) in Eredivisie promotion/relegation play-offs)	1	43	15
Almere City	2023–24	Eredivisie	0	0	0	0	—		0	0
Almere City	Total		36	14	2	0	5	1	43	15
Willem II (loan)	2023–24	Eerste Divisie	35	16	2	1	—		37	17
Arminia Bielefeld	2024–25	3. Liga	3	0	0	0	—		3	0
Cambuur (loan)	2024–25	Eerste Divisie	13	3	0	0	1	0	14	3
Arminia Bielefeld II	2025–26	Oberliga Westfalen	3	0	—		—		3	0
Career total			224	70	7	1	6	1	237	72

=== International ===
As of match played 8 June 2024

National team	Year	Apps	Goals
Suriname	2022	5	1
Suriname	2023	1	0
Suriname	2024	2	1
Total		8	2

Scores and results list Suriname's goal tally first, score column indicates score after each Hilterman goal.

List of international goals scored by Jeredy Hilterman
No.	Date	Venue	Opponent	Score	Result	Competition	Ref.
1	22 September 2022	Yanmar Stadion, Almere, Netherlands	Nicaragua	2–1	2–1	Friendly	
2	5 June 2024	Dr. Ir. Franklin Essed Stadion, Paramaribo, Suriname	Saint Vincent and the Grenadines	2–1	4–1	2026 FIFA World Cup qualification	
