= Jack Imperato =

American soccer player

Personal information
- Full name: John "Jack" Imperato
- Date of birth: February 20, 2002 (age 24)
- Place of birth: Dallas, Texas, United States
- Height: 5 ft 11 in (1.80 m)
- Position: Midfielder

Team information
- Current team: Glacis United
- Number: 26

Youth career
- 2015–2018: De Anza Force
- 2018–2021: Villarreal
- 2019: → Roda (youth loan)

Senior career*
Years	Team	Apps	(Gls)
2021	Orange County SC	3	(0)
2022	Real Monarchs	10	(0)
2023	Athletic Torrellano	8	(1)
2023–2024	Algeciras	0	(0)
2025–	Glacis United	1	(0)

International career
- United States U15
- United States U17
- * Club domestic league appearances and goals as of 31 August 2025

Jack Imperato (born February 20, 2002) is an American professional soccer player who plays as a midfielder for Gibraltar Football League side Glacis United.

== Club career ==
Born in Dallas, Texas, Imperato moved with his family to San Jose, California when he was 12 years old. He joined U.S. Soccer Development Academy side De Anza Force academy in 2015. In 2018, Imperato was scouted during a tournament with De Anza and went on a trial with Spanish club Villarreal before joining their youth system. During the 2019–20 season, Imperato was sent out on loan to Roda, a partnered club with Villarreal.

=== Orange County SC ===
On April 7, 2021, Imperato returned to the United States and joined USL Championship club Orange County SC. He made his professional debut for the club on May 16, 2021, against Tacoma Defiance, coming on as an 80th-minute substitute in a 1–0 defeat.

=== Real Monarchs ===
Imperato signed with Real Salt Lake's MLS Next Pro affiliate Real Monarchs on February 4, 2022.

=== Glacis United ===
After a spell at Algeciras in Spain, Imperato joined Gibraltar Football League side Glacis United in summer 2025, making his debut on 31 August 2025 against College 1975.

== International career ==
Imperato has represented the United States at the under-14, under-15, and under-17 levels.

== Career statistics ==
As of match played May 29, 2021

Appearances and goals by club, season and competition
Club	Season	League			National Cup		Continental		Total	
Club	Season	Division	Apps	Goals	Apps	Goals	Apps	Goals	Apps	Goals
Orange County SC	2021	USL Championship	2	0	0	0	—		2	0
Career total			2	0	0	0	0	0	2	0

== Honors ==
Orange County SC

- USL Cup: 2021
