= De Anza Force =

De Anza Force Soccer Club
- Founded: 1999
- League: MLS Next
- Website: http://www.deanzaforce.org/

De Anza Force Soccer Club is an association football club in Saratoga, California, with nearly 80 boys' and girls' teams from under-7 to under-18 level.

== History ==
Founded in 1999, the De Anza Force has grown into one of the largest American soccer development clubs, with 95% of alumni going on to receive scholarships at NCAA schools. The club has produced over ten players who have gone on to represent the United States at full international level, with numerous others representing at youth level.

The club has over thirty coaches, including former United States internationals Jeff Baicher, Paul Bravo and Brandi Chastain. Former Barcelona academy director Albert Puig has served as technical director for the club.

In 2020, the club was invited to take part in the Elite Clubs National League (ECNL) at youth level, as well as the MLS Next.

== Notable former players ==
- Note: Players highlighted in **bold** are full internationals for the nation indicated.

=== Men ===
- (Bosnia and Herzegovina) Nedin Tucaković
- (Democratic Republic of the Congo) Ariel Mbumba
- (El Salvador) **Damián Alguera**
- (El Salvador) Javier Mariona
- (Guam) **Dallas Jaye**
- (Iran) Arshia Babazadeh
- (Mexico) Edwin Lara
- (Mexico) Carlos Saldaña
- (Peru) Diego Otoya
- (Republic of Ireland) Cristiano Fitzgerald
- (Republic of Ireland) Josh O'Brien
- (United States) Michael Amick
- (United States) Paul Blanchette
- (United States) Stefano Bonomo
- (United States) Sebastian Cruz
- (United States) Christian Dean
- (United States) Esai Easley
- (United States) Jack Imperato
- (United States) Thomas Janjigian
- (United States) Benji Joya
- (United States) Sam Junqua
- (United States) Tarun Karumanchi
- (United States) Preston Kilwien
- (United States) Nico Lemoine
- (United States) Mikey Minutillo
- (United States) Max Ornstil
- (United States) Marc Pelosi
- (United States) Matthew Powell
- (United States) Joshua Pynadath
- (United States) Will Richmond
- (United States) Brady Scott
- (United States) Timothy Syrel
- (United States) Niko Tsakiris
- (United States) Kody Wakasa
- (United States) Kahveh Zahiroleslam
- (Indonesia) Lucas Raphael Lee

=== Women ===
- (Philippines) **Reina Bonta**
- (Philippines) **Sarina Bolden**
- (United States) **Naomi Girma**
- (United States) Delaney Baie Pridham
- (United States) Brianna Visalli
- (United States) Joelle Anderson
