= Sem Valk =

Dutch footballer (born 2002)

- Valk with Telstar in 2026

Personal information
- Date of birth: 16 February 2002 (age 24)
- Place of birth: Capelle aan den IJssel, Netherlands
- Height: 1.95 m (6 ft 5 in)
- Position: Centre-back

Team information
- Current team: Telstar
- Number: 16

Youth career
- 2006–2010: VV Capelle
- 2010–2021: Feyenoord

Senior career*
Years	Team	Apps	(Gls)
2021–2024	Feyenoord	0	(0)
2024–2026	Dordrecht	66	(3)
2026–	Telstar	10	(1)
- * Club domestic league appearances and goals as of 16:41, 12 November 2026 (UTC)

Sem Valk (born 16 February 2002) is a Dutch professional footballer who plays as a centre-back for Eredivisie club Telstar.

Valk spent 14 years in the Feyenoord academy and captained the club's under-21 side. He made one first-team appearance in the UEFA Conference League in December 2021. He joined Eerste Divisie club Dordrecht on a free transfer in 2024, reached the promotion play-offs in his first season and became club captain in his second. He moved to Telstar in August 2026.

== Early life and career ==
Valk was born on 16 February 2002 in Capelle aan den IJssel. He grew up in a footballing family. His father played the game, and the family were Feyenoord supporters who took him to De Kuip from an early age. When he was four, the family moved to Nesselande in Rotterdam. He kept playing for VV Capelle, where his father coached his team.

During a friendly against Feyenoord, the opposing coach asked Valk's father about the team's number seven. After several successful trial sessions, Valk was offered a place in the Feyenoord academy. He joined in 2010, at the age of eight.

His parents encouraged him not to neglect school and friends for football. He attended the Thorbecke Talentschool in Rotterdam with other Feyenoord youth players. He signed his first professional contract in his final year of VWO pre-university education. He then decided to postpone further study and concentrate on his football career. He played as a midfielder for much of his youth career. After a growth spurt took him to 1.95 metres, his youth coach Dirk Kuyt moved him into central defence.

== Club career ==
=== Feyenoord ===
In May 2020, Feyenoord agreed a first professional contract with Valk, then an 18-year-old in the under-19 side. Because of COVID-19 restrictions, the deal was to be signed at a later date. He was twice named in the first-team matchday squad during the 2020–21 season.

New head coach Arne Slot included Valk in a group of 29 players for the start of pre-season in the summer of 2021. He played in the first friendly of the summer, a 1–1 draw with Gent. He also travelled to the training camp in Austria and appeared against Red Bull Salzburg, before returning to the under-21 side.

Valk with Feyenoord in pre-season friendly against Red Bull Salzburg in 2022

During that pre-season, a screenshot from the Feyenoord players' group chat circulated on social media. It showed club captain Steven Berghuis leaving the chat ahead of his move to rivals Ajax, and Valk could be seen in the background photograph. The screenshot exposed the phone numbers of several teammates. Valk was summoned to explain himself to Slot. In December 2021, he confirmed publicly that he had taken the screenshot. He said he deeply regretted it and had apologised to the squad, which had accepted his apology.

Valk made his first-team debut on 9 December 2021, in a 2–1 home win over Maccabi Haifa in the Europa Conference League group stage. Feyenoord had already qualified for the knockout rounds. He replaced Marcos Senesi ten minutes after half-time. He played the final 34 minutes. It proved to be his only first-team appearance for the club.

On 17 August 2022, Valk signed a new contract until mid-2024 with an option for a further year. His previous deal had been due to expire in 2023. Head of academy Rini Coolen praised his physical, mental and footballing development. Valk described the deal as a reward for a good season.

Valk went on to captain Feyenoord's under-21 side. In early April 2024, the club told him that his contract would not be renewed. He left that summer after 14 years in the academy.

=== Dordrecht ===
On 22 May 2024, Valk agreed to join Eerste Divisie club Dordrecht on a free transfer. He signed a contract until mid-2026 with an option for a further year. Feyenoord's head of global football, Mark Ruijl, called the move a positive step for both parties.

Valk quickly became a regular starter at Dordrecht. The club reached the promotion play-offs in the 2024–25 season. They knocked out De Graafschap 2–0 on aggregate in the second round. In the first leg of the semi-final against Willem II on 21 May 2025, Valk headed in a corner from Jari Schuurman to make it 2–0, and Dordrecht won 2–1. Willem II won the return leg 3–2 three days later, levelling the tie at 4–4 on aggregate. Willem II won the penalty shoot-out 5–4 and went through to the final.

On 7 August 2025, head coach Dirk Kuyt named Valk club captain in succession to Schuurman, who had left for Willem II. In October 2025, he was carried off on a stretcher with a knee injury during a 3–0 defeat away to ADO Den Haag. He returned almost two months later, coming off the bench in a 4–3 home defeat to FC Eindhoven on 12 December 2025. On 31 March 2026, Dordrecht took up the option in his contract, keeping him at the club until mid-2027.

Valk played the first two league matches of the 2026–27 season before leaving the club. He made 71 official appearances for Dordrecht, scoring four goals and providing six assists. Technical manager Sjoerd Ars said Valk had arrived as a talent and developed into a captain and leader. Valk said he would continue to follow the club as a supporter.

=== Telstar ===
On 24 August 2026, Valk joined Eredivisie club Telstar on a contract until mid-2029, becoming the club's 11th signing of the summer. Technical manager Peter Hofstede said Valk had already shown strong leadership qualities.

Valk made his debut six days later in a 4–0 home defeat to Ajax. He played the full 90 minutes. He scored his first Eredivisie goal on 23 October 2026, in the last minute of a 3–2 defeat away to Go Ahead Eagles.

On 7 November 2026, Valk scored an own goal away to Fortuna Sittard. He tried to play a long, lofted back-pass to goalkeeper Ronald Koeman Jr. from distance, but mis-hit it and the ball went over the goalkeeper and into the net, putting Telstar 2–0 down. His teammates fought back to draw 2–2. Valk said afterwards that he was angry and embarrassed with himself.

== Style of play ==
Valk is a right-footed centre-back who stands 1.95 metres tall. A former midfielder, he describes himself as a defender who is comfortable on the ball. When Telstar signed him, technical manager Peter Hofstede named his height, footballing ability and mentality among his strengths.

== Career statistics ==
As of match played 7 November 2026

Appearances and goals by club, season and competition
Club	Season	League			KNVB Cup		Europe		Other		Total	
Club	Season	Division	Apps	Goals	Apps	Goals	Apps	Goals	Apps	Goals	Apps	Goals
Feyenoord	2021–22	Eredivisie	0	0	0	0	1 (Note: Appearance in UEFA Conference League)	0	—		1	0
Feyenoord	2022–23	Eredivisie	0	0	0	0	—		—		0	0
Feyenoord	2023–24	Eredivisie	0	0	0	0	—		—		0	0
Feyenoord	Total		0	0	0	0	1	0	—		1	0
Dordrecht	2024–25	Eerste Divisie	34	1	1	0	—		4 (Note: Appearances in Eerste Divisie play-offs)	1	39	2
Dordrecht	2025–26	Eerste Divisie	30	2	0	0	—		—		30	2
Dordrecht	2026–27	Eerste Divisie	2	0	—		—		—		2	0
Dordrecht	Total		66	3	1	0	—		4	1	71	4
Telstar	2026–27	Eredivisie	10	1	1	0	—		—		11	1
Career total			76	4	2	0	1	0	4	1	83	5
