= Matthew Powell (soccer) =

American soccer player

Personal information
- Full name: Matthew Ribeiro Powell
- Date of birth: December 11, 1996 (age 29)
- Place of birth: Hayward, California, United States
- Height: 1.85 m (6 ft 1 in)
- Position: Defender

Youth career
- –2015: De Anza Force

College career
| Years | Team | Apps | (Gls) |
| 2015–2019 | UCLA Bruins | 72 | (6) |

Senior career*
| Years | Team | Apps | (Gls) |
| 2017–2019 | FC Golden State Force | 11 | (0) |
| 2020 | Los Angeles Force | 2 | (0) |
| 2020 | Greenville Triumph | 2 | (0) |
- * Club domestic league appearances and goals as of October 25, 2020

Matthew Ribeiro Powell (born December 11, 1996) is an American soccer player who plays as a defender.

== Career ==
=== Youth, College & Amateur ===
Powell played with USSDA side De Anza Force, before playing college soccer at the University of California, Los Angeles in 2015. After redshirting his freshman year, Powell went on to play 72 appearances for the Bruins, scoring 6 goals and tallying 5 assists, as well as being a three-time All-Pac-12 selection.

While at college, Powell also appeared for USL League Two side FC Golden State Force. where he made 11 appearances across three seasons for the club.

=== Los Angeles Force ===
Powell joined NISA side Los Angeles Force for their 2020 season, making 2 appearances the club during the season.

=== Greenville Triumph ===
On September 18, 2020, Powell joined USL League One side Greenville Triumph for the remainder of the season. He made his debut on October 2, 2020, appearing as a 77th-minute substitute during a 2–0 win over Orlando City B. Greenville declined Powell's contract option following their 2020 season.
