= Diego Otoya =

Peruvian footballer (born 2005)

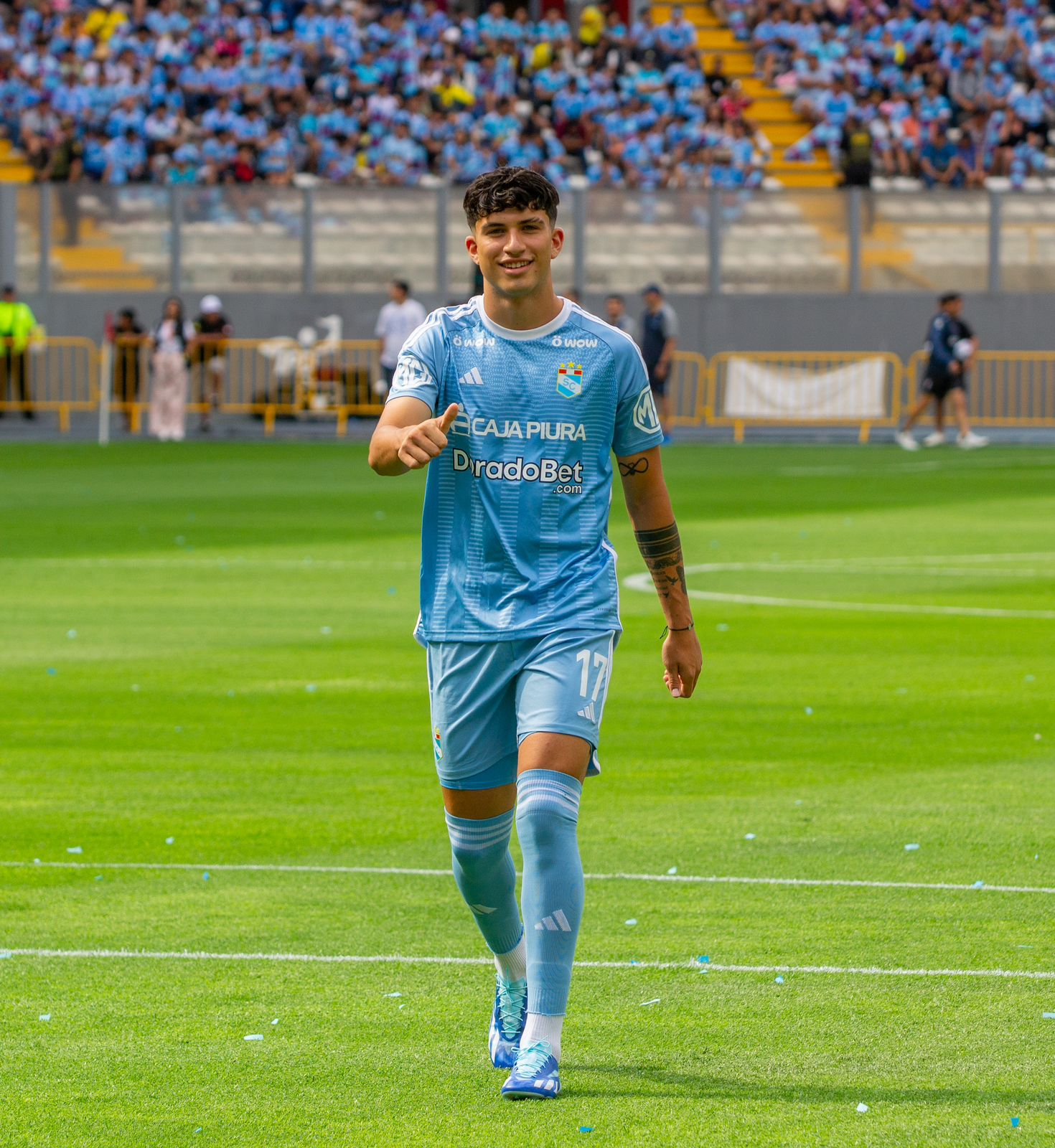
- Otoya playing for Peruvian club Sporting Cristal

Personal information
- Full name: Diego Martín Otoya Torres
- Date of birth: 13 September 2004 (age 22)
- Place of birth: San Francisco, California, United States
- Height: 1.88 m (6 ft 2 in)
- Position: Forward

Team information
- Current team: Monterey Bay FC (on loan from Sporting Cristal)
- Number: 21

Youth career
- De Anza Force
- 2019–2022: San Jose Earthquakes

College career
| Years | Team | Apps | (Gls) |
| 2022 | UC Irvine Anteaters | 14 | (2) |

Senior career*
| Years | Team | Apps | (Gls) |
| 2022 | San Jose Earthquakes II | 9 | (2) |
| 2023– | Sporting Cristal | 0 | (0) |
| 2025 | → Sport Boys (loan) | 9 | (0) |
| 2026– | → Monterey Bay FC (loan) | 12 | (1) |

International career^{‡}
- Peru U17
| 2021– | Peru U20 | | |
- * Club domestic league appearances and goals as of 18:50, 9 November 2026 (UTC) ‡ National team caps and goals as of 05:00, 13 January 2023 (UTC)

Diego Martín Otoya Torres (born 13 September 2004) is a professional footballer who plays as a forward for Monterey Bay FC on loan from Sporting Cristal. Born in the United States, he represents Peru at youth international level.

== Club career ==
Born in California to a Peruvian father and American mother, Otoya played for the De Anza Force and San Jose Earthquakes at youth level. He played nine games in the MLS Next Pro for the reserve team of the San Jose Earthquakes, scoring twice, before committing to the University of California, Irvine for the end of the 2022 season.

In January 2023, he moved to Peru to sign a professional contract with Sporting Cristal.

On July 29, 2026, Monterey Bay FC of the USL Championship announced they had acquired Otoya on loan for the remainder of the season.

== International career ==
Eligible to represent the United States and Peru at international level, Otoya has played for Peru at under-17 and under-20 level. He received his first call up to the under-20 side in July 2021.

== Career statistics ==
=== Club ===
As of 31 December 2025.

Appearances and goals by club, season and competition
| Club | Division | League | | | Cup | | Continental | | Total | |
| Club | Division | Season | Apps | Goals | Apps | Goals | Apps | Goals | Apps | Goals |
|---|---|---|---|---|---|---|---|---|---|---|
| San Jose Earthquakes II | MLS Next Pro | 2022 | 9 | 2 | — | | — | | 9 | 2 |
| Sporting Cristal | Peruvian Primera División | 2023 | 8 | 1 | — | | — | | 8 | 1 |
| Sporting Cristal | Peruvian Primera División | 2024 | 9 | 1 | — | | — | | 9 | 1 |
| Sporting Cristal | Total | | 17 | 2 | 0 | 0 | 0 | 0 | 17 | 2 |
| Sport Boys | Peruvian Primera División | 2025 | 9 | 0 | — | | — | | 9 | 0 |
| Sporting Cristal | Peruvian Primera División | 2025 | 4 | 1 | — | | — | | 4 | 1 |
| Career total | | | 39 | 5 | 0 | 0 | 0 | 0 | 39 | 5 |
