= Thijs Jansen =

Dutch footballer (born 2001)

Personal information
- Date of birth: 29 November 2001 (age 24)
- Place of birth: Lisserbroek, Netherlands
- Height: 1.92 m (6 ft 4 in)
- Position: Goalkeeper

Team information
- Current team: Cambuur
- Number: 1

Youth career
- –2018: Feyenoord
- 2018–2019: Groningen
- 2019–2022: Feyenoord

Senior career*
Years	Team	Apps	(Gls)
2022–2024	Feyenoord	0	(0)
2022–2023	→ TOP Oss (loan)	34	(0)
2023–2024	→ De Graafschap (loan)	21	(0)
2024–	Cambuur	75	(0)
- * Club domestic league appearances and goals as of 28 April 2026

Thijs Jansen (born 29 November 2001) is a Dutch professional footballer who plays as a goalkeeper for Eredivisie club Cambuur.

== Career ==
=== Early years ===
Born in Lisserbroek, Jansen played initially as an outfield player as a youngster at FC Lisse and played in the academy at Feyenoord from the age of twelve. In 2018 he spent six months with Groningen before returning to Feyenoord.

=== Feyenoord ===
He signed a first professional contract with Feyenoord in June 2020. It was then announced on 24 December 2020 that he would extend his contract until mid-2023. Jansen gained match day experience a number of times over the 2021–22 season, including being a substitute at the UEFA Conference League final in 2022 against AS Roma. In August 2022 Jansen signed a new three-year professional contract with Feyenoord.

==== TOP Oss (loan) ====
In August 2022 Jansen signed on a one-season loan with TOP Oss in order to gain playing experience. He made his professional debut in the Eerste Divisie against VVV Venlo on 26 August 2022.

==== De Graafschap (loan) ====
Ahead of the 2023–24 season, Jansen joined De Graafschap on a one-season loan, initially to be the backup goalkeeper, although he clean sheet on his debut appearance, a 0–0 draw against Roda JC on 29 September 2023.

However, he took over the starting spot from an underperforming Mees Bakker in December 2023.

=== SC Cambuur ===
On 19 July 2024, Jansen signed a three-year contract with Eerste Divisie club Cambuur. He immediately became the starting goalkeeper, making his competitive debut on 9 August and keeping a clean sheet in a 1–0 away victory against MVV.

== Career statistics ==
As of match played 8 November 2026

Appearances and goals by club, season and competition
Club	Season	League			KNVB Cup		Europe		Other		Total	
Club	Season	Division	Apps	Goals	Apps	Goals	Apps	Goals	Apps	Goals	Apps	Goals
Feyenoord	2020–21	Eredivisie	0	0	0	0	0	0	—		0	0
Feyenoord	2021–22	Eredivisie	0	0	0	0	0	0	—		0	0
Feyenoord	2022–23	Eredivisie	0	0	—		—		—		0	0
Feyenoord	Total		0	0	0	0	0	0	—		0	0
TOP Oss (loan)	2022–23	Eerste Divisie	34	0	1	0	—		—		35	0
De Graafschap (loan)	2023–24	Eerste Divisie	21	0	2	0	—		2 (Note: Appearance(s) in Eredivisie play-offs)	0	25	0
Cambuur	2024–25	Eerste Divisie	37	0	0	0	—		2	0	39	0
Cambuur	2025–26	Eerste Divisie	38	0	0	0	—		—		38	0
Cambuur	2026–27	Eredivisie	12	0	0	0	—		—		12	0
Cambuur	Total		87	0	0	0	—		2	0	89	0
Career total			142	0	3	0	0	0	4	0	149	0
