= Arshia Babazadeh =

Iranian footballer (born 1995)

Personal information
- Full name: Arshia Aghababazadeh عرشیا آقابابازاده
- Date of birth: November 5, 1995 (age 31)
- Place of birth: Tehran, Iran
- Height: 1.90 m (6 ft 3 in)
- Position: Goalkeeper

Youth career
- 2009–2014: Esteghlal
- 2014–2016: De Anza Force

Senior career*
Years	Team	Apps	(Gls)
2016–2018	Esteghlal	0	(0)
2018–2019	Surat Thani		
2019	Philadelphia Fury	1	(0)
2019	Los Angeles Force	0	(0)
2020	Michigan Stars	2	(0)
2021	Austin Bold	1	(0)
- * Club domestic league appearances and goals as of 20 October 2021

Arshia Babazadeh (Persian: عرشیا بابازاده; born 5 November 1995) is an Iranian professional footballer.

== Career ==
=== Youth ===
Babazadeh joined the Esteghlal academy at the age of 13 years old. In 2014, he moved to the United States and was part of the De Anza Force club team.

=== Professional ===
In 2016, Babazadeh returned to Esteghlal and helped the side lift the Hazfi Cup and participated in the AFC Champions League. In 2018, he moved to Thai League 3 side Surat Thani for a season.

2019 saw Babazadeh return to the United States, joining NISA side Philadelphia Fury. He made a single appearance for the club before they folded after one game due to investment issues. He spent the remainder of the season with Los Angeles Force, without making an appearance. 2020 saw Babazadeh stay in the NISA with Michigan Stars, where he made two regular season appearances.

On 5 May 2021, Babazadeh signed with USL Championship side Austin Bold. He made his debut for Austin on 20 October 2021, starting in a 3–0 loss to El Paso Locomotive.
