= Jaden Slory =

Dutch association football player

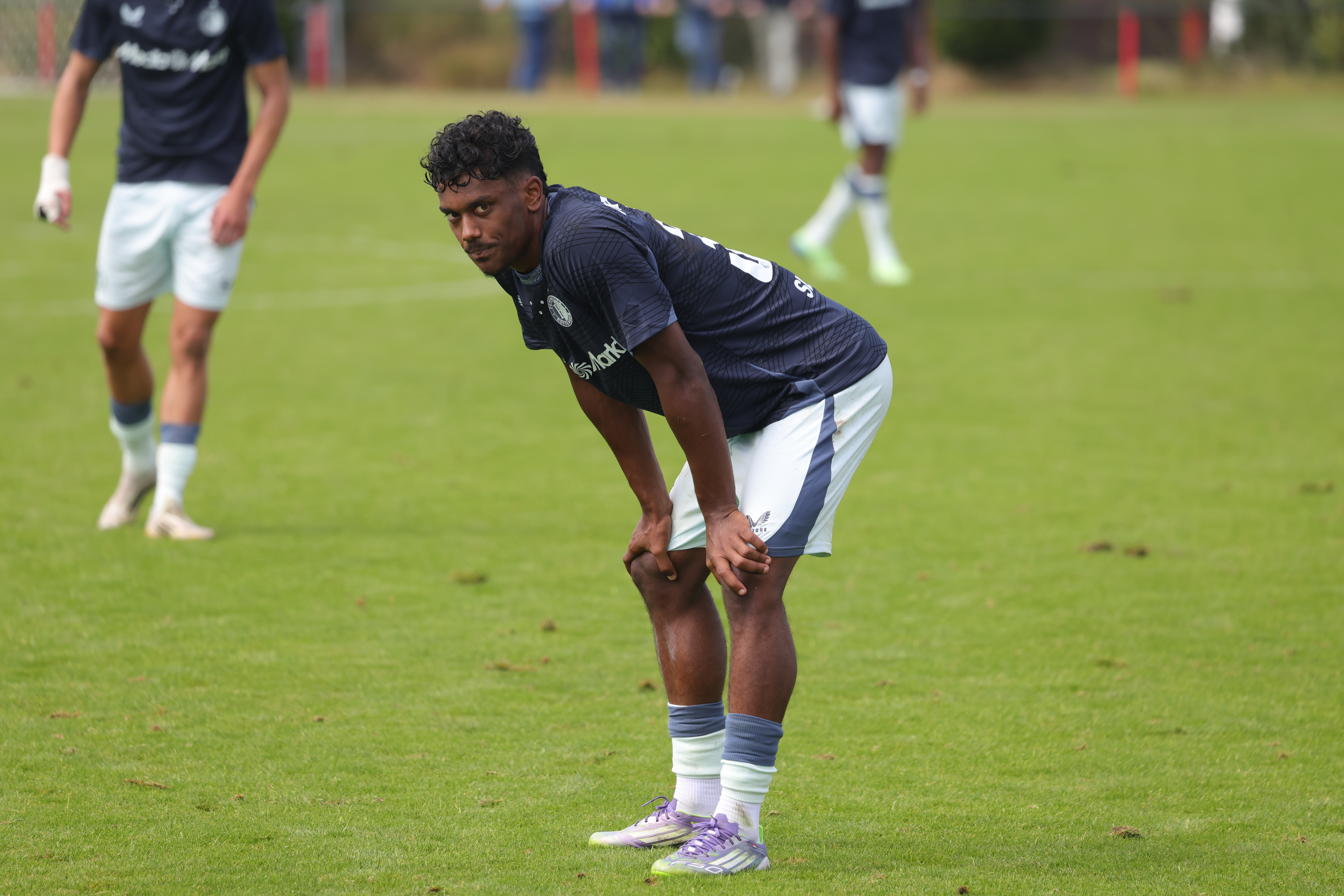

Personal information
- Full name: Jaden Fernando Slory
- Date of birth: 9 May 2005 (age 21)
- Place of birth: Netherlands
- Height: 1.75 m (5 ft 9 in)
- Position: Forward

Team information
- Current team: Willem II (on loan from Feyenoord)
- Number: 7

Youth career
- –2013: Barendrecht
- 2013–2024: Feyenoord

Senior career*
Years	Team	Apps	(Gls)
2024–	Feyenoord	6	(0)
2024–2025	→ Dordrecht (loan)	33	(10)
2026	→ Go Ahead Eagles (loan)	13	(0)
2026–	→ Willem II (loan)	0	(0)

International career^{‡}
2021–2023	Netherlands U17	10	(4)
2023	Netherlands U18	2	(1)
2023–2024	Netherlands U19	7	(4)
2025–	Netherlands U21	4	(0)
- * Club domestic league appearances and goals as of 18:42, 10 May 2026 (UTC) ‡ National team caps and goals as of 30 March 2026

Jaden Fernando Slory (born 9 May 2005) is a Dutch footballer who plays as a winger for Eredivisie club Willem II, on loan from Feyenoord.

== Career ==
Slory joined the Feyenoord Academy in 2013. In 2021, he signed a three-year contract with Feyenoord. As he entered the final year of his contract, Slory had trained with the Feyenoord first team without making his first team debut. He became free to discuss terms with other clubs from 1 January 2024. However, Feyenoord announced he has signed a new contract with them in February 2024, keeping him at the club until 2027. He made his debut in the match day squad on 29 February 2024. Slory made his official debut for the club on 16 August 2025.

On 29 August 2024, Slory was loaned by Dordrecht.

On 22 December 2025, Slory agreed to join Go Ahead Eagles on loan for the second half of the 2025–26 season. On 7 July 2026, he moved on a new loan to Willem II.

== International career ==
Slory was selected for the 2022 UEFA European Under-17 Championship. He was described as a stand-out performer as Netherlands U-17 reached the final. In 2023, he was part of the Dutch U18 side that won the U18 Confederations Cup.

== Style of play ==
He is described as a right-winger with pace, and a calmness in front of goal.

== Personal life ==
He is the son of former Netherlands international and Feyenoord player Andwélé Slory.

== Career statistics ==
As of match played 10 May 2026

Appearances and goals by club, season and competition
Club	Season	League			Cup		Europe		Other		Total	
Club	Season	Division	Apps	Goals	Apps	Goals	Apps	Goals	Apps	Goals	Apps	Goals
Feyenoord	2023–24	Eredivisie	0	0	0	0	0	0	0	0	0	0
Feyenoord	2025–26	Eredivisie	6	0	1	0	0	0	—		7	0
Feyenoord	Total		6	0	1	0	0	0	0	0	7	0
Dordrecht (loan)	2024–25	Eerste Divisie	33	10	1	0	—		4 (Note: Appearances in promotion play-off)	2	38	12
Go Ahead Eagles (loan)	2025–26	Eredivisie	13	0	2	0	—		0	0	15	0
Career total			52	10	4	0	0	0	4	2	60	12
