= Cristiano Fitzgerald =

Irish footballer

Personal information
- Full name: Cristiano Michael Fitzgerald
- Date of birth: 10 November 2003 (age 22)
- Place of birth: Singapore
- Height: 1.76 m (5 ft 9 in)
- Position: Winger

Youth career
- 2017–2019: Boavista
- 2019–2020: De Anza Force
- 2020–2024: Boavista
- 2024: Estrela da Amadora

College career
Years	Team	Apps	(Gls)
2024	Maryland Terrapins	7	(0)
2025–	Xavier Musketeers	10	(0)

International career
2021	Republic of Ireland U19	2	(0)

Cristiano Michael Fitzgerald (born 10 November 2003) is a footballer who plays as a winger at Xavier University in the United States. Born in Singapore, he represents the Republic of Ireland at youth international level.

== Early life ==
Born in Singapore to an Irish father from Limerick and a French mother, Fitzgerald was named after then-Manchester United player Cristiano Ronaldo. His father had been watching the 2003–04 Premier League season opener against Bolton Wanderers, in which Ronaldo made his debut, and decided upon the name for his son. He moved to London shortly after his first birthday, before spending seven years in San Diego, California.

== Club career ==
=== Early career in Portugal ===
He returned to Singapore, joining a local football team who would routinely tour Europe, playing in Spain, Sweden and Portugal. His family moved again in 2017, this time to Porto, Portugal, and shortly after, he joined the academy of Boavista. He also spent some time back in the United States due to his father's work, playing for the De Anza Force.

He returned to Boavista in 2020, and a year later, he was clocked as one of the fastest players in world football. He went on trial with Scottish club Dundee United in July 2022, but this amounted to nothing. In September 2022, he was promoted to Boavista's first team, and made his unofficial debut for the club in a friendly match against French side Bordeaux on 16 December 2022.

On 30 January 2024, Fitzgerald left Boavista, without ever making his official debut, and joined fellow Primeira Liga club Estrela da Amadora.

=== Collegiate soccer ===
After half a year with Estrela da Amadora, Fitzgerald moved to the United States, enrolling at the University of Maryland. After seven appearances for the University of Maryland, Fitzgerald transferred to Xavier University, where he featured for the Xavier Musketeers soccer team.

== International career ==
Fitzgerald is eligible to represent the Republic of Ireland and France through his parents, Singapore through birth, and Portugal, having lived there since 2017. He has expressed his desire to represent the Republic of Ireland. In 2021, he made his first appearance for the Republic of Ireland at under-19 level.

== Personal life ==
Fitzgerald's father, Jimmy, was a youth hurling player for the Limerick county hurling team in Ireland. His brother Julian is also a footballer, and currently plays alongside Fitzgerald at Xavier University.
