= Fedde de Jong =

Dutch footballer (born 2003)

Personal information
- Date of birth: 13 June 2003 (age 23)
- Place of birth: Uitgeest, Netherlands
- Height: 1.85 m (6 ft 1 in)
- Position: Midfielder

Team information
- Current team: De Graafschap
- Number: 22

Youth career
- –2016: FC Uitgeest
- 2016–2020: AZ

Senior career*
Years	Team	Apps	(Gls)
2020–2022	Jong AZ	78	(8)
2022–2023	AZ	2	(0)
2023–2025	Cambuur	60	(7)
2025–	De Graafschap	34	(2)

International career^{‡}
2017–2018	Netherlands U15	7	(0)
2018–2019	Netherlands U16	5	(0)
2019	Netherlands U17	5	(0)
2021	Netherlands U19	6	(3)
2023	Netherlands U20	1	(0)
2023	Netherlands U21	1	(0)
- * Club domestic league appearances and goals as of 28 April 2026 ‡ National team caps and goals as of 9 August 2023

Fedde de Jong (born 13 June 2003) is a Dutch professional footballer who plays as a midfielder for Eerste Divisie club De Graafschap.

== Club career ==
=== AZ ===
De Jong was born in Uitgeest, North Holland, where he started playing football for FC Uitgeest, before joining AZ's youth academy in 2016. In January 2019, at the age of 15, De Jong joined AZ's first team during their winter training camp, where he made his unofficial debut in a friendly against Fenerbahçe.

De Jong made his professional debut with Jong AZ in a 1–1 Eerste Divisie draw with SC Telstar on 2 November 2020, replacing Des Kunst in the 84th minute.

On 28 July 2022, De Jong made his first-team debut for AZ, coming on as a substitute in the 75th minute of a UEFA Europa Conference League second-round match against Tuzla City. He scored his first goal six minutes later, helping his side to a 4–0 victory.

=== Cambuur ===
On 20 June 2023, De Jong signed a three-year contract with newly relegated Eerste Divisie club Cambuur. He made his competitive debut for the club on 11 August, the first matchday of the season, starting in a 2–2 home draw against Emmen. On 6 October, he scored his first goal for Cambuur in a 5–2 away league loss to Dordrecht. De Jong was a key member of the Cambuur team in 2023–24, scoring six goals in 41 appearances. Despite his contributions, the team finished in a disappointing 13th place in the league, although they did reach the semi-finals of the KNVB Cup.

=== De Graafschap ===
On 2 September 2025, De Jong signed a contract with De Graafschap for one season, with an optional second season.

== International career ==
De Jong played for Netherlands youth teams, from under-15s level to the under-20s.

De Jong made his debut for the Netherlands U21s on 8 September 2023, coming on as a substitute for Isaac Babadi in a 3–0 win of Moldova U21s.

== Career statistics ==
As of match played 7 March 2025

Appearances and goals by club, season and competition
Club	Season	League			KNVB Cup		Europe		Other		Total	
Club	Season	Division	Apps	Goals	Apps	Goals	Apps	Goals	Apps	Goals	Apps	Goals
Jong AZ	2020–21	Eerste Divisie	17	1	—		—		—		17	1
Jong AZ	2021–22	Eerste Divisie	35	4	—		—		—		35	4
Jong AZ	2022–23	Eerste Divisie	26	3	—		—		—		26	3
Jong AZ	Total		78	8	—		—		—		78	8
AZ	2022–23	Eredivisie	2	0	0	0	1 (Note: Appearance in UEFA Europa Conference League)	1	—		3	1
Cambuur	2023–24	Eerste Divisie	36	5	5	1	—		—		41	6
Cambuur	2024–25	Eerste Divisie	24	2	2	0	—		—		26	2
Cambuur	Total		60	7	7	1	—		—		67	8
Career total			140	15	7	1	1	1	0	0	148	17
