= Benjamin Pauwels =

Belgian footballer

Personal information
- Date of birth: 29 October 2004 (age 22)
- Place of birth: Knokke-Heist, Belgium
- Height: 1.81 m (5 ft 11 in)
- Position: Winger

Team information
- Current team: Casa Pia (on loan from Leganés)

Youth career
- 2019–2023: Gent

Senior career*
Years	Team	Apps	(Gls)
2022–2023	Jong Gent	11	(0)
2023–2024	Beerschot	18	(0)
2024–2025	Cambuur	35	(4)
2025–	Leganés	10	(0)
2026	→ Volendam (loan)	8	(1)
2026–	→ Casa Pia (loan)	0	(0)

International career^{‡}
2025–	Belgium U21	2	(1)
- * Club domestic league appearances and goals as of 19 May 2026 ‡ National team caps and goals as of 09:58, 19 November 2025 (UTC)

Benjamin Pauwels (born 29 October 2004) is a Belgian footballer who plays as a left winger for Primeira Liga club Casa Pia, on loan from Segunda División club Leganés.

== Club career ==
Pauwels began his career with Gent, but suffered a knee injury in August 2022 which sidelined him for six months. Upon returning, he played for the under-21 squad and also for Jong Gent in the Division 1.

On 8 August 2023, Pauwels signed a two-year contract with Challenger Pro League side Beerschot, after a trial period. On 14 June of the following year, he moved abroad for the first time in his career, joining Eerste Divisie side SC Cambuur.

On 21 July 2025, Pauwels switched teams and countries again, after agreeing to a four-year deal with CD Leganés in the Spanish Segunda División. The following 2 February, he moved to Volendam on loan. On 28 August 2026, he was loaned to Primeira Liga club Casa Pia for one season.

== International career ==
On 14 March 2025, Pauwels was called up to the Belgium under-21 team for two friendlies. He scored on his debut against Sweden six days later.
