= Tyrique Mercera =

Curaçaoan association football player (born 2003)

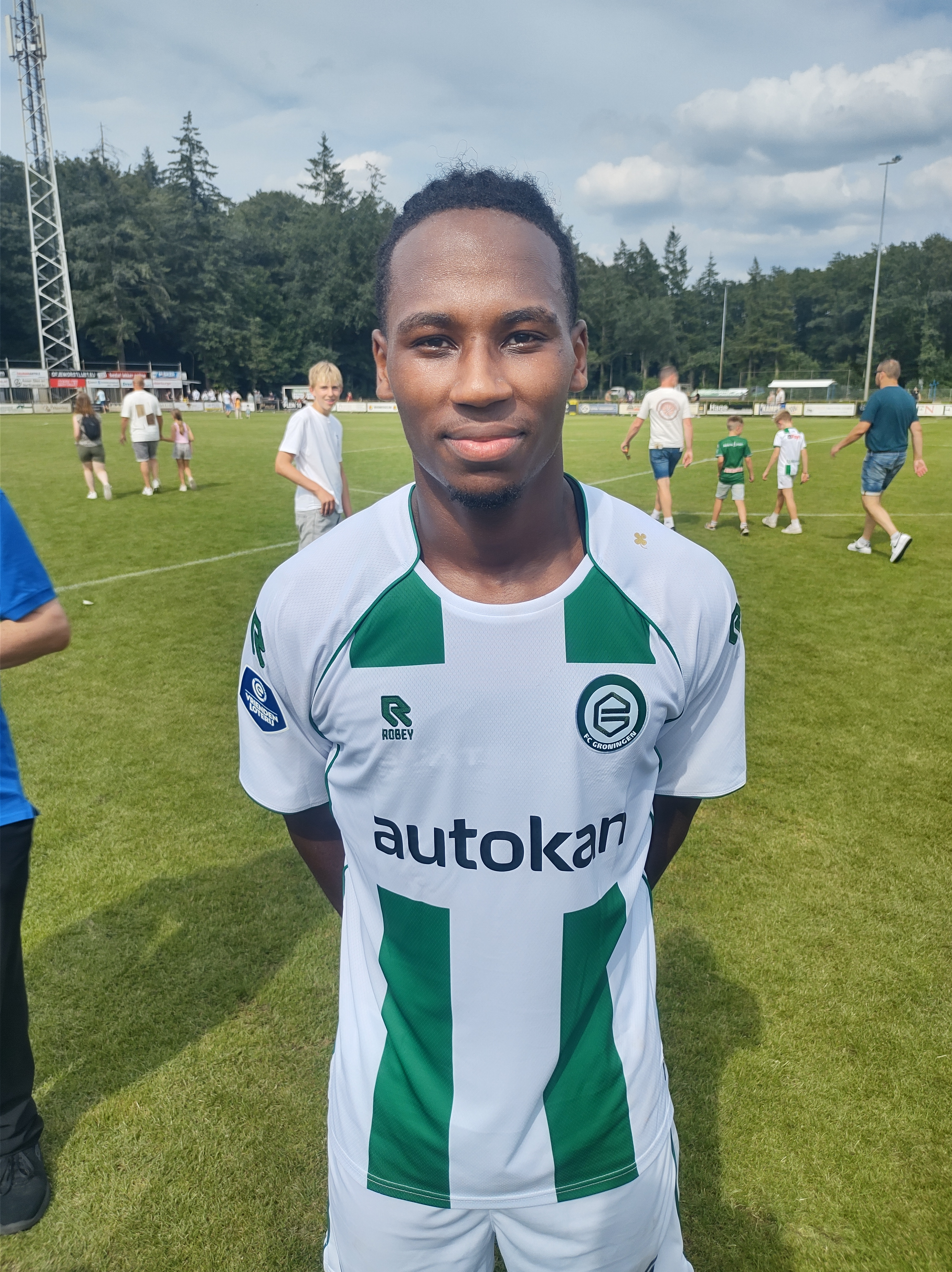
- Mercera with Groningen in 2025

Personal information
- Date of birth: 19 December 2003 (age 22)
- Place of birth: The Hague, Netherlands
- Height: 1.87 m (6 ft 1 1/2 in)
- Position: Defender

Team information
- Current team: Groningen
- Number: 29

Youth career
- –2022: Alphense Boys
- 2022–2023: Cambuur

Senior career*
Years	Team	Apps	(Gls)
2023–2025	Cambuur	47	(3)
2025–	Groningen	22	(0)

International career
2024–	Curaçao	1	(0)
- * Club domestic league appearances and goals as of 19 May 2026

Tyrique Mercera (born 19 December 2003) is a professional footballer who plays as a defender for Eredivisie club Groningen. Born in the Netherlands, he plays for the Curaçao national team.

== Club career ==
From South Holland, Mercera played as a youngster for Alphense Boys prior to joining the youth academy of Cambuur. In the summer of 2024, he signed a two-year professional contract with the club. A versatile player, he featured for the club at both full-back positions as well as centrally in defensive midfield. He scored his first professional goals for Cambuur with a brace in a 4–0 Eerste Divisie win against Jong FC Utrecht in September 2024. For his efforts in that game he was awarded the league player of the week award on 25 September 2024.

On 18 July 2025, Mercera signed a four-year contract with Groningen.

== International career ==
He received his first call-up to the Curaçao national football team by head coach Dick Advocaat in the autumn of 2023. He appeared as a substitute in the 2024–25 CONCACAF Nations League B match against Saint Martin on 15 November 2024 to make his debut for the national team.

== Personal life ==
When he was an amateur footballer he supplemented his income by working as a delivery driver.
