= Ayoub Ouarghi =

Moroccan footballer (born 2008)

Personal information
- Date of birth: 5 February 2008 (age 18)
- Place of birth: Amsterdam, Netherlands
- Height: 1.66 m (5 ft 5 in)
- Position: Midfielder

Team information
- Current team: Dordrecht (on loan from Feyenoord)
- Number: 10

Youth career
- –2016: Zeeburgia
- 2016–2026: Feyenoord

Senior career*
Years	Team	Apps	(Gls)
2025–	Feyenoord	1	(0)
2026–	→ Dordrecht	3	(1)

International career^{‡}
2023	Netherlands U15	3	(1)
2023	Netherlands U16	4	(1)
2023	Morocco U16	2	(0)
2024–2025	Netherlands U17	10	(2)
2025	Netherlands U18	6	(2)
- * Club domestic league appearances and goals as of 23:27, 21 August 2026 (UTC) ‡ National team caps and goals as of 23:27, 21 August 2026 (UTC)

Ayoub Ouarghi (born 5 February 2008) is a professional footballer who plays as a midfielder for Eerste Divisie club Dordrecht, on loan from Eredivisie club Feyenoord. Born in the Netherlands, he committed to play for the Morocco national team.

== Club career ==
Ouarghi played for Zeeburgia before joining the Feyenoord Academy in 2016. He gained notority for his appearance on videos of Soufiane Touzani, where he was called het Monster. On 17 March 2023, Feyenoord announced an agreement in principle for a first professional contract for Ouarghi. The three-year contract was signed on 12 May 2023. Ouarghi was included in the squad of the first team for a first time on 23 November 2025, for a 2–4 league defeat to NEC. He made his professional debut on 6 December 2025, replacing Sem Steijn during a 6–1 win over PEC Zwolle in the Eredivisie. Later that month, he was included by the NOS in their list of 20 Dutch talents for a third consecutive year. On 20 January 2026, Ouarghi signed a contract extension with Feyenoord, keeping him at the club until June 2028.

On 10 June 2026, it was announced that Ouarghi was loaned out by Feyenoord to Eerste Divisie side Dordrecht for the 2026–27 season. He made his debut for the club on 7 August 2026, scoring the winning goal during a 2–1 league win over Jong Ajax.

== International career ==
On 28 February 2023, Ouarghi made his debut for the Netherlands under-15 team, in a 2–1 friendly defeat to Belgium. He scored his first goal for the team on 6 May 2023, helping his side beat Germany 2–1. He later went on to represent the Netherlands at under-16, under-17 and under-18 level. In 2023, he also played for the Morocco under-16 team. On 16 March 2026, Ouarghi's request to his switch international allegiance to Morocco was approved by FIFA. This decision followed a successful meeting with officials from the Royal Moroccan Football Federation, effectively ending his international stint with the Dutch youth setups where he had frequently served as captain.

== Career statistics ==
As of match played 21 August 2026

Appearances and goals by club, season and competition
Club	Season	League			National cup		Europe		Other		Total	
Club	Season	Division	Apps	Goals	Apps	Goals	Apps	Goals	Apps	Goals	Apps	Goals
Feyenoord	2025–26	Eredivisie	1	0	0	0	0	0	—		1	0
Dordrecht (loan)	2026–27	Eerste Divisie	3	1	0	0	—		0	0	3	1
Career total			4	1	0	0	0	0	0	0	4	1
