= Yannis M'Bemba =

Gabonese footballer (born 2001)

Personal information
- Date of birth: 1 July 2001 (age 25)
- Place of birth: Amiens, France
- Height: 1.94 m (6 ft 4 in)
- Position: Central defender

Team information
- Current team: Dordrecht
- Number: 15

Youth career
- 2010–2011: Amiens SC
- 2011–2021: Nantes

Senior career*
| Years | Team | Apps | (Gls) |
| 2020–2024 | Nantes B | 48 | (2) |
| 2021–2022 | Nantes | 2 | (0) |
| 2022–2023 | → Le Puy (loan) | 30 | (0) |
| 2024– | Dordrecht | 55 | (2) |

International career^{‡}
| 2024– | Gabon | 5 | (1) |
- * Club domestic league appearances and goals as of 28 April 2026 ‡ National team caps and goals as of 30 March 2026

Yannis M'Bemba (born 1 July 2001) is a professional footballer who plays for Dutch Eerste Divisie club Dordrecht. Born in France, he represents the Gabon national team.

== Early life ==
Yannis M'Bemba was born in Amiens, in a family with Gabonese and Congolese origins, growing up in Amiens while his mother worked in Paris.

== Club career ==
Having started his career at Amiens SC as a 9-year-old, M'Bemba quickly moved to Nantes, where his father was working, joining FC Nantes academy as an under-11.

Having progressed from the youth teams to the reserve team, he signed his first professional contract with the club in April 2021.

After making several appearances on the bench as an unused substitute in both Ligue 1 and Coupe de France, the young defender made his professional debut for FC Nantes on the 14 January 2022, replacing Sébastien Corchia in a 2–1 away Ligue 1 loss against Nice.

On 1 July 2022, M'Bemba joined Le Puy in Championnat National on loan for the 2022–23 season. The centre-back who played for FC Nantes two Ligue 1 games, was released with end of his contract, at FC Nantes on 30 May 2024.

On 30 July 2024, M'Bemba signed with Dordrecht in the Netherlands.

== International career ==
Having made the pre-selections for France youth teams in his early years, M'Bemba is also eligible for Gabon and Congo-Brazzaville as per his origins. M'Bemba first called to Gabon on 5 February 2024 and made his debut for the Gabon national football team, in a friendly game vs Senegal national football team on 25 March 2024.

== Career statistics ==
=== Club ===
As of match played 18 April 2026

Appearances and goals by club, season and competition
| Club | Season | League | | | National cup | | Other | | Total | |
| Club | Season | Division | Apps | Goals | Apps | Goals | Apps | Goals | Apps | Goals |
|---|---|---|---|---|---|---|---|---|---|---|
| Nantes B | 2020–21 | CFA 2 | 3 | 0 | — | | — | | 3 | 0 |
| Nantes B | 2021–22 | CFA 2 | 20 | 1 | — | | — | | 20 | 1 |
| Nantes B | 2023–24 | National 3 | 25 | 1 | — | | — | | 25 | 1 |
| Nantes B | Total | | 48 | 2 | — | | — | | 48 | 2 |
| Nantes | 2021–22 | Ligue 1 | 2 | 0 | 0 | 0 | 0 | 0 | 2 | 0 |
| Le Puy (loan) | 2022–23 | CFA | 24 | 0 | 6 | 0 | — | | 30 | 0 |
| Dordrecht | 2024–25 | Eerste Divisie | 30 | 0 | 1 | 0 | 4 (Note: Appearances in promotion play-offs) | 0 | 35 | 0 |
| Dordrecht | 2025–26 | Eerste Divisie | 25 | 2 | 1 | 0 | — | | 26 | 2 |
| Dordrecht | Total | | 55 | 2 | 2 | 0 | 4 | 0 | 61 | 2 |
| Career total | | | 129 | 4 | 8 | 0 | 4 | 0 | 141 | 4 |

=== International ===
As of match played 30 March 2026

Appearances and goals by national team and year
| National team | Year | Apps | Goals |
|---|---|---|---|
| Gabon | 2024 | 1 | 0 |
| Gabon | 2025 | 3 | 1 |
| Gabon | 2026 | 1 | 0 |
| Total | | 5 | 1 |

Scores and results list Gabon's goal tally first, score column indicates score after each M'Bemba goal.

List of international goals scored by Yannis M'Bemba
| No. | Date | Venue | Opponent | Score | Result | Competition |
|---|---|---|---|---|---|---|
| 1 | 3 September 2025 | National Sports Complex Pitch 1, Saint Pierre, Mauritius | Seychelles | 4–0 | 4–0 | 2026 FIFA World Cup qualification |
