= Devin Haen =

Dutch footballer (born 2004)

Personal information
- Date of birth: 18 June 2004 (age 22)
- Place of birth: Zieuwent, Netherlands
- Height: 1.73 m (5 ft 8 in)
- Position: Striker

Team information
- Current team: Willem II
- Number: 9

Youth career
- –2013: RKZVC
- 2013–2020: De Graafschap

Senior career*
Years	Team	Apps	(Gls)
2020–2024	De Graafschap	75	(14)
2024–2025	Feyenoord	0	(0)
2024–2025	→ Dordrecht (loan)	34	(12)
2025–	Willem II	33	(18)

International career^{‡}
2021–2022	Netherlands U18	5	(3)
2022	Netherlands U19	6	(1)
2025–	Netherlands U21	2	(0)
- * Club domestic league appearances and goals as of 28 April 2026 ‡ National team caps and goals as of 18 November 2025

Devin Haen (born 18 June 2004) is a Dutch professional footballer who plays as a striker for Eredivisie club Willem II.

== Career ==
=== De Graafschap ===
Born in Zieuwent, Haen played football initially for RKZVC. He moved to the De Graafschap football academy from RKZVC in 2013. He signed a three-year professional professional contract with De Graafschap in 2021, just prior to his 17th birthday.

Haen had started training with the De Graafschap first team at the age of sixteen years-of-age. Haen made a goalscoring debut for De Graafschap on 20 August 2021, appearing as a substitute in a 2–0 win over NAC Breda in the Eerste Divisie and scoring the second goal.

=== Feyenoord ===
On 3 July 2024, Haen signed a two-year contract with an option for an additional year with Eredivisie club Feyenoord. He was immediately sent on a one-season loan to Dordrecht as part of the deal.

==== Dordrecht (loan) ====
He made his debut for FC Dordrecht as a starter in a 2–1 away win over in the Eerste Divisie against FC Emmen on 9 August 2024. He scored his first goal for the club later that same month in a 3–1 away league defeat to Jong AZ on 26 August 2024. He reached double figures for goals during the season and scored his eleventh league goal for Dordrecht in a 3–0 win over Jong Ajax on 4 April 2025.

=== Willem II ===
On 3 July 2025, Haen signed a three-year contract with Willem II.

== International career ==
Haen has represented the Netherlands under-19 side. He scored for the Netherlands U19s against Moldova U19s in September 2022. In March 2023 he was called up to the Netherlands U20s.

== Personal life ==
His parents are Don and Rian Haen-Weikamp, and he has a sister called Romy.

== Career statistics ==
As of match played 8 August 2026

Appearances and goals by club, season and competition
Club	Season	League			KNVB Cup		Other		Total	
Club	Season	Division	Apps	Goals	Apps	Goals	Apps	Goals	Apps	Goals
De Graafschap	2021–22	Eerste Divisie	24	3	1	0	0	0	25	3
De Graafschap	2022–23	Eerste Divisie	29	8	4	0	—		33	8
De Graafschap	2023–24	Eerste Divisie	22	3	1	0	2 (Note: Appearances in Eredivisie play-offs)	0	25	3
De Graafschap	Total		75	14	6	0	2	0	83	14
Feyenoord	2024–25	Eredivisie	0	0	0	0	0	0	0	0
Dordrecht (loan)	2024–25	Eerste Divisie	34	12	0	0	4	1	38	13
Willem II	2025–26	Eerste Divisie	33	18	2	1	5	0	40	19
Willem II	2026–27	Eredivisie	1	1	0	0	—		1	1
Willem II	Total		34	19	2	1	5	0	41	20
Career total			143	45	8	1	11	1	162	47
