= Lorenzo Codutti =

Italian association football player (born 2003)

Personal information
- Date of birth: 27 June 2003 (age 23)
- Place of birth: Cussignacco, Udine, Italy
- Height: 1.83 m (6 ft 0 in)
- Position: Defender

Team information
- Current team: Pontedera
- Number: 24

Youth career
- –2022: Udinese

Senior career*
Years	Team	Apps	(Gls)
2022–2023	Arzignano Valchiampo		
2022–2023	→ Vado (loan)	22	(1)
2023–2024	Vado	33	(1)
2024–2026	Dordrecht	33	(2)
2026–	Pontedera	1	(0)
- * Club domestic league appearances and goals as of 4 October 2026

Lorenzo Codutti (born 27 June 2003) is an Italian professional footballer who plays as a defender for Serie D club Pontedera.

== Career ==
Codutti was born in Cussignacco, Udine in 2003 and played in the Udinese Calcio youth system. He played for Arzignano Valchiampo before joining Vado in July 2022. Codutti played two seasons with Vado in Serie D, making 37 appearances and scoring one goal.

He moved to the Netherlands and joined Dordrecht of the Eerste Divisie in July 2024, agreeing to a two-year contract. Codutti made a goal scoring debut for the club, earning a 1–1 draw for the side on 17 August 2024 against ADO Den Haag.

On 28 September 2026, Codutti returned to Italy and signed with Pontedera in Serie D.

== Personal life ==
He has dual Italian and Dutch nationalities. Codutti has an Italian father and a Dutch mother, with family in Winschoten, in the northeast of the Netherlands. When he first moved to the Netherlands in 2024 with Dordrecht he shared a house with Italian teammate Gabriele Parlanti.
