= Joshua Pynadath =

American soccer player

Personal information
- Full name: Joshua Joseph Pynadath
- Date of birth: February 20, 2002 (age 24)
- Place of birth: Mountain View, California, United States
- Height: 5 ft 9 in (1.75 m)
- Position: Winger

Youth career
- 2009–2012: Red Star
- 2012–2013: De Anza Force
- 2013–2015: Real Madrid
- 2015–2019: Ajax

Senior career*
Years	Team	Apps	(Gls)
2019–2020	Jong Ajax	8	(0)
2022–2024	Jong AZ	5	(0)
2024–2026	FC Dordrecht	30	(3)

International career
2016–2017	United States U15	3	(0)
2018	United States U17	5	(1)
- * Club domestic league appearances and goals as of April 28, 2026

Joshua Joseph Pynadath (born February 20, 2002) is an American professional soccer player who plays primarily as a winger. Pynadath has represented the United States internationally at various youth levels.

== Club career ==
=== Ajax ===
Pynadath, who was born to American parents (father is of Indian descent), started playing soccer at Red Star Soccer Academy in his youth. In 2013, he made headlines when Spanish giants Barcelona and Real Madrid showed interest in signing him into their youth systems. Pynadath ended up signing with Real Madrid, becoming the first American—and the first player of Indian descent—ever to join the club's youth program.

In 2015, Pynadath moved to the Netherlands and joined the Ajax youth system. On September 16, 2019, he made his professional debut when he came on as a substitute for Jong Ajax in an Eerste Divisie match against Jong PSV.

On April 9, 2020, it was announced that Pynadath had decided to leave the Ajax Youth Academy at the age of 18, seeking to play in a higher competition.

It was later reported that Pynadath was trialing with Chelsea.

=== AZ ===
On June 30, 2022, Pynadath signed a two-year contract at AZ Alkmaar. He made his Eerste Divisie debut for Jong AZ on August 16, 2022, in a 2–0 victory against NAC Breda.

=== FC Dordrecht ===
On July 8, 2024, Pynadath joined FC Dordrecht on a two-year deal, with an option for third year.

== International career ==
Pynadath has been capped by the United States at the U15, U17, and U18 levels.

== Personal life ==
Pynadath is of American and Indian Malayali origin.
