= Gabriele Parlanti =

Italian association football player (born 2004)

Personal information
- Date of birth: 28 January 2004 (age 22)
- Place of birth: Genoa, Italy
- Height: 1.80 m (5 ft 11 in)
- Position: Midfielder

Team information
- Current team: Carrarese
- Number: 77

Senior career*
Years	Team	Apps	(Gls)
2023–2024	Sestri Levante	22	(1)
2024	Triestina	0	(0)
2024	→ Sestri Levante (loan)	14	(1)
2024–2025	Feyenoord	0	(0)
2024–2025	→ Dordrecht (loan)	29	(0)
2025–	Carrarese	19	(0)
- * Club domestic league appearances and goals as of 13 May 2026

Gabriele Parlanti (born 28 January 2004) is an Italian professional footballer who plays as a midfielder for Serie B club Carrarese.

== Career ==
Parlanti played for Sestri Levante helping them gain promotion from Serie D in 2023.

He joined Triestina in January 2024. He was then loaned back to Sestri Levante to play the rest of the season in Serie C.

Parlanti moved to the Netherlands and signed for Eredivisie club Feyenoord in the summer of 2024, agreeing to a two-year contract with an optional extra year. He immediately joined Eerste Divisie club Dordrecht on loan afterwards.

He made his Eerste Divisie debut for Dordrecht on 17 September 2024 away at Volendam. Parlanti had been due to make his debut in the previous fixture against FC Eindhoven but was left off the team sheet due to an administrative error.

On 16 July 2025, Parlanti moved to Carrarese in Serie B on a three-year deal.

== Personal life ==
When he first moved on loan to Dordrecht he shared a house with Italian teammate Lorenzo Codutti.
