= Vieiri Kotzebue =

Dutch professional footballer

Personal information
- Date of birth: 31 August 2002 (age 24)
- Place of birth: Rotterdam, Netherlands
- Height: 1.70 m (5 ft 7 in)
- Position: Forward

Team information
- Current team: Novi Pazar
- Number: 9

Youth career
- Sparta Rotterdam
- NAC Breda

Senior career*
Years	Team	Apps	(Gls)
2021–2023	NAC Breda	21	(2)
2023–2026	FC Den Bosch	37	(4)
2025	→ FC Dordrecht (loan)	11	(2)
2026–	Novi Pazar	16	(3)
- * Club domestic league appearances and goals as of 12 June 2026

Ferdinand H. William "Vieri" Kotzebue (born 31 August 2002) is a Dutch professional footballer who plays for Serbian club Novi Pazar as a forward.

== Career ==
Born in Rotterdam, Kotzebue began his career at Sparta Rotterdam, and was a youth player at NAC Breda before joining the first team in 2021, initially as an amateur player. After a trial with the club, Kotzebue signed for FC Den Bosch in June 2023.

On 30 January 2025, Kotzebue joined FC Dordrecht on loan with an option to buy.

On 17 January 2026, he signed contract with Serbian Superliga club Novi Pazar until 2028.
