= 2023–24 SC Cambuur season =

Dutch football club season

SC Cambuur
2023–24 season
- Chairman: Cees Heijboer
- Head coach: Sjors Ultee (until 9 October 2023); Henk de Jong (from 10 October 2023)
- Stadium: Cambuur Stadion
- Eerste Divisie: 13th
- KNVB Cup: Semi-final
- Top goalscorer: League: Milan Smit (19); All: Milan Smit (24)
- Highest home attendance: 10,000 (Week 1, Week 10, Week 12, KNVB Cup Semi-final)
- Lowest home attendance: 5,460 (KNVB Cup 1st round)
- Average home league attendance: 9,700
- Biggest win: 8-1 TOP Oss (a) Week 13
- Biggest defeat: 5-2 FC Dordrecht (a) Week 9; 3-0 FC Groningen (a) week 35
Home colours	Away colours
- All statistics correct as of 10 May 2024.

The 2023–24 season marked SC Cambuur’s 50th season in the Eerste Divisie and their first consecutive campaign at this level. The club finished the regular league season in 13th place.

SC Cambuur also competed in the KNVB Cup, reaching the semifinals before being eliminated following a 2–1 extra-time loss to NEC Nijmegen.

Milan Smit was the club’s leading scorer during the season, recording 24 goals in all competitions, with 19 goals scored in the league and five in the KNVB Cup.

The player with the most appearances was Marco Tol, who featured 42 times overall, including 37 league appearances and five in the KNVB Cup.

== Players ==
=== First-team squad ===
As of 5 February 2024

Note: Flags indicate national team as defined under FIFA eligibility rules; some limited exceptions apply. Players may hold more than one non-FIFA nationality.

No.	Pos.	Nation	Player
1	GK	NED	Yanick van Osch
2	DF	NED	Gabi Caschili
3	DF	NED	Floris Smand
4	DF	NED	Léon Bergsma
5	DF	SLE	Alex Bangura
5	DF	NED	Thomas Poll
6	DF	NED	Jeremy van Mullem
7	FW	NED	Remco Balk
8	MF	NED	Daniël van Kaam
9	FW	LVA	Roberts Uldriķis (captain)
10	MF	NED	Fedde de Jong
11	FW	NED	Silvester van der Water
12	FW	ITA	Youns El Hilali
14	MF	NED	Michael Breij
15	DF	NED	Marco Tol
16	GK	NED	Daan Reiziger
17	DF	NED	Vito Wormgoor
18	FW	USA	Augustin Anello

No.	Pos.	Nation	Player
19	FW	NED	Milan Smit
20	MF	NED	Vincent Pichel
21	DF	NED	Milan de Koe
22	DF	HAI	Jhondly van der Meer
25	DF	NOR	Sturla Ottesen
27	DF	GUI	Sekou Sylla
33	DF	NED	Chima Anyasi
34	DF	NED	Toni Jonker
35	DF	NED	Myles Veldman
36	DF	NED	Marcel Schaapman
39	MF	NED	Tom van der Werff
40	MF	NED	Matthias Nartey
41	FW	NED	Yorem van der Veen
42	DF	CUW	Tyrique Mercera
44	DF	NED	Bram Marsman
49	FW	NED	Wiebe Kooistra
51	FW	NED	Iwan Henstra

== Transfers ==
=== In ===
Pos.	Player	Transferred from	Fee	Date
MF	(Netherlands) Fedde de Jong	(Netherlands) AZ Alkmaar U21		1 July 2023
FW	(Netherlands) Iwan Henstra	(Netherlands) FC Surhústerfean	Free	1 July 2023
GK	(Netherlands) Yanick van Osch	(Netherlands) Fortuna Sittard	Free	1 July 2023
FW	(Italy) Youns El Hilali	(Italy) AC Milan U19		12 July 2023
DF	(Netherlands) Milan de Koe	(Netherlands) Harkemase Boys	Free	14 July 2023
DF	(Netherlands) Gabi Caschili	(Netherlands) PEC Zwolle		25 July 2023
GK	(Netherlands) Daan Reiziger	(Netherlands) SBV Vitesse		1 September 2023
DF	(Netherlands) Jeremy van Mullem	(Netherlands) Sparta Rotterdam		1 September 2023
DF	(Netherlands) Thomas Poll	(Netherlands) Almere City FC	On loan	1 September 2023
FW	(United States) Agustin Anello	(Netherlands) Sparta Rotterdam	On loan	26 January 2024
DF	(Netherlands) Vito Wormgoor	(Norway) IK Start	Free	30 January 2024
DF	(Norway) Sturla Ottesen	(Norway) Stabæk Fotball	Free	5 February 2024

=== Out ===
Pos.	Player	Transferred to	Fee	Date
FW	(Switzerland) Felix Mambimbi	(Switzerland) BSC Young Boys	End of loan	30 June 2023
GK	(Portugal) João Virgínia	(England) Everton F.C.	End of loan	30 June 2023
FW	(Morocco) Mimoun Mahi	(Netherlands) FC Utrecht	End of loan	30 June 2023
DF	(Suriname) Calvin Mac-Intosch	(Netherlands) TOP Oss	Free	1 July 2023
MF	(Netherlands) Mees Hoedemakers	(Netherlands) NEC Nijmegen	Free	1 July 2023
GK	(Netherlands) Robbin Ruiter	No club		1 July 2023
MF	(France) Robin Maulun	No club		1 July 2023
DF	(Japan) Sai van Wermeskerken	No club		1 July 2023
FW	(Gabon) David Sambissa	(Turkey) İstanbulspor	Free	6 July 2023
FW	(Norway) Bjørn Johnsen	(South Korea) FC Seoul	Free	23 July 2023
MF	(Netherlands) Mitchel Paulissen	(Hong Kong) Lee Man FC	Free	7 August 2023
DF	(Netherlands) Doke Schmidt	(Netherlands) Helmond Sport	Free	8 August 2023
MF	(Netherlands) Jamie Jacobs	(Denmark) Viborg FF	Free	16 August 2023
MF	(Netherlands) Navarone Foor	(Cyprus) Karmiotissa FC	Free	16 August 2023
DF	(Sierra Leone) Alex Bangura	(England) Middlesbrough F.C.	€670,000	1 September 2023
MF	(Netherlands) Ben Rienstra	(Netherlands) DETO Twenterand	Free	1 September 2023

== Pre-season and friendlies ==
Win Draw Loss Fixtures

8 July 2023 Friendly	SC Cambuur	3–0	SSV Jeddeloh	Koarnjum
17:30	Daniël van Kaam 6'; Michael Breij 59'; Remco Balk 74'	Report		Stadium: Martenawei

15 July 2023 Rienk Waaksma Memorial	SC Cambuur	4–0	Harkemase Boys	Kootstertille
17:00	Milan Smit 31' (pen.); Remco Balk 47'; Wiebe Kooistra 49'; Roberts Uldriķis 80'			Stadium: Sportpark de Tille

22 July 2023 Friendly	SC Cambuur	4–1	Heracles Almelo	Leeuwarden
14:30	Roberts Uldriķis 14'; Milan Smit 77' 102' (pen.); Remco Balk 109'	Report	Sven Sonnenberg 12'	Stadium: Cambuur Stadion

28 July 2023 Friendly	SC Cambuur	1–0	Jong Utrecht	Scharendijke
13:00	Roberts Uldriķis 7'

28 July 2023 Friendly	SC Cambuur	2–1	Zulte Waregem	Scharendijke
15:00	Silvester van der Water 46'; Milan Smit 51'	Report	Timothy Derijck 57'

4 August 2023 Friendly	SC Cambuur	0–2	Francs Borains	Leeuwarden
13:30				Stadium: Cambuur Stadion

4 August 2023 Friendly	SC Cambuur	3–4	Francs Borains	Leeuwarden
18:00				Stadium: Cambuur Stadion

6 January 2024 Friendly	SC Cambuur	1–0	SC Preußen Münster
13:00	Fedde de Jong 11'

== Competitions ==
=== Overall record ===
Competition	First match	Last match	Starting round	Final position	Record							
Competition	First match	Last match	Starting round	Final position	Pld	W	D	L	GF	GA	GD	Win %
Eerste Divisie	11 August 2023	10 May 2024	Matchday 1	13th	38	13	8	17	71	74	−3	34.21
KNVB Cup	2 November 2023	27 February 2024	1st round	Semi-final	5	4	0	1	15	7	+8	80.00
Total					43	17	8	18	86	81	+5	39.53

Last updated: 3 January 2026
Source: ESPN

=== Eerste Divisie ===
==== League table ====
Pos	Team	Pld	W	D	L	GF	GA	GD	Pts	Promotion or qualification
11	Helmond Sport	38	14	9	15	52	55	−3	51	
12	VVV-Venlo	38	13	9	16	53	58	−5	48	
13	Cambuur	38	13	8	17	71	74	−3	47	
14	Eindhoven	38	9	16	13	45	57	−12	43	
15	Jong Ajax	38	10	10	18	54	69	−15	40	Reserve teams are not eligible to be promoted to the Eredivisie

Source: Flashscore, Keuken Kampioen Divisie (in Dutch)
Rules for classification: Season in progress: 1) Most points won; 2) Less points lost; 3) Goal difference; 4) Goals scored; 5) Alphabetical order; End of season: 1) Points; 2) Goal difference; 3) Goals scored; 4) Head-to-head points; 5) Head-to-head goal difference; 6) Head-to-head away goals scored; 7) Play-off if relevant for deciding champion, relegation or participating in a European league, otherwise by draw. 8) Penalty shoot-out (only after a play-off)

==== Results summary ====
Overall								Home						Away					
Pld	W	D	L	GF	GA	GD	Pts	W	D	L	GF	GA	GD	W	D	L	GF	GA	GD
38	13	8	17	71	74	−3	47	6	6	7	38	37	+1	7	2	10	33	37	−4

Last updated: 4 January 2026.
Source: ESPN

==== Results by round ====
Round	1	2	3	4	5	6	7	8	9	10	11	12	13	14	15	16	17	18	19	20	21	22	23	24	25	26	27	28	29	30	31	32	33	34	35	36	37	38
Ground	H	A	H	A	H	H	A	H	A	H	A	H	A	A	H	A	H	A	H	A	H	H	A	H	H	A	A	A	H	A	H	A	H	A	A	H	A	H
Result	D	W	W	L	W	W	L	L	L	L	D	W	W	W	D	W	D	W	L	L	W	L	D	D	L	W	L	L	L	L	W	W	L	L	L	D	L	D
Position	10	3	2	6	4	3	4	9	11	13	13	12	9	6	6	6	6	6	6	7																		13

Updated to match(es) played on 10 May 2024. Source: ESPN
A = Away; H = Home; W = Win; D = Draw; L = Loss

=== Matches ===
The league fixtures were unveiled on 30 June 2023.

==== 1st half ====
11 August 2023 1st week	SC Cambuur	2–2	FC Emmen	Leeuwarden
20:00	Jhondly van der Meer (yellow card) 45+3'; Alex Bangura (yellow card) 53'; Fedde de Jong (yellow card) 63'; Silvester van der Water (yellow card) 63'; Michael Breij 66' (yellow card) 83'; Wiebe Kooistra 90+8'	Report	Ben Scholte 38'; Jeff Hardeveld 44'; Lorenzo Burnet (yellow card) 53'; Jan Hoekstra (yellow card) 63'; Ahmed El Messaoudi (yellow card) 90+4'	Stadium: Cambuur Stadion; Attendance: 10,000; Referee: Alex Bos

18 August 2023 2nd week	SC Telstar	2–3	SC Cambuur	Velsen-Zuid
20:00	Youssef El Kachati (yellow card) 4'; Mitch Apau (yellow card) 18'; Sebbe Augustijns (yellow card) 19'; Ronald Koeman Jr. (yellow card) 26'; Jorginho Soares (yellow card) 33'; Quinten van den Heerik 46'; Zakaria Eddahchouri 79'; Jayden Turfkruier (red card) 85'	Report	Milan Smit 19' (pen.) (yellow card) 20' (goal) 34' (pen.); Daniël van Kaam (yellow card) 33'; Michael Breij 71'; Youns El Hilali (yellow card) 90+2'	Stadium: 711 Stadion; Attendance: 1,073; Referee: Stan Teuben

25 August 2023 3rd week	SC Cambuur	4–2	Jong Ajax	Leeuwarden
20:00	Silvester van der Water 10'; Michael Breij 17'; Remco Balk 25'; Gabi Caschili (yellow card) 45+2'; Milan Smit 58' (pen.)	Report	Gabriel Misehouy 8'; Rida Chahid 31'; Tristan Gooijer (yellow card) 57'	Stadium: Cambuur Stadion; Attendance: 9,600; Referee: Martin Fernando Perezlindo

1 September 2023 4th week	Helmond Sport	2–1	SC Cambuur	Helmond
20:00	Joseph Amuzu (yellow card) 32'; Martijn Kaars 48' 90' (yellow card) 90+1'; Flor Van den Eynden (yellow card) 71'	Report	Milan Smit 70'; Remco Balk (yellow card) 90+11'	Stadium: GS Staalwerken Stadion; Attendance: 1,537; Referee: Kevin Puts

9 September 2023 5th week	SC Cambuur	3–1	FC Den Bosch	Leeuwarden
18:45	Remco Balk 9' 16' (yellow card) 42'; Youns El Hilali (yellow card) 23'; Milan Smit 63' (pen.) (yellow card) 83'; Gabi Caschili (yellow card) 68'	Report	Dennis Gyamfi (yellow card) 3'; Rik Mulders 37'; Jakub Ojrzyński (yellow card) 61'; Nick de Groot (yellow card) 61'; Yuya Ikeshita (yellow card) 73'	Stadium: Cambuur Stadion; Attendance: 9,411; Referee: Nick Smit

17 September 2023 6th week	SC Cambuur	1–0	Willem II Tilburg	Leeuwarden
16:45	Jeremy van Mullem (yellow card) 43'; Michael Breij (yellow card) 49'; Gabi Caschili (yellow card) 72'; Youns El Hilali 77'; Thomas Poll (yellow card) 90'; Jhondly van der Meer (yellow card) 90+1'	Report	Matthias Verreth (yellow card) 45+1'; Rúnar Þór Sigurgeirsson (yellow card) 56'; Jeremy Bokila (yellow card) 57'; Nick Doodeman (yellow card) 71'	Stadium: Cambuur Stadion; Attendance: 9,852; Referee: Dennis Higler

22 September 2023 7th week	Jong FC Utrecht	3–2	SC Cambuur	Utrecht
20:00	Mees Rijks 4'; Nazjir Held (yellow card) 25'; Rickson van Hees (yellow card) 29'; Tobias Augustinus-Jensen 45+1'; Yannick Leliendal (yellow card) 66'; Rafik el Arguioui 88' (yellow card) 88'	Report	Milan Smit 16' (pen.); Remco Balk (yellow card) 50'; Youns El Hilali 59'	Stadium: Stadion Galgenwaard; Attendance: 468; Referee: Wouter Wiersma

29 September 2023 8th week	SC Cambuur	3–4	Jong PSV	Leeuwarden
20:00	Sekou Sylla (red card) 33'; Roberts Uldriķis (yellow card) 42'; Michael Breij 51'; Silvester van der Water 63'; Milan Smit 89'	Report	Jason van Duiven 21' 88'; Tygo Land 28' 67'	Stadium: Cambuur Stadion; Attendance: 9,542; Referee: Clay Ruperti

6 October 2023 9th week	FC Dordrecht	5–2	SC Cambuur	Dordrecht
20:00	Rene Kriwak 6' 30'; Ilias Sebaoui 22' 85'; Antef Tsoungui (yellow card) 76'; Mathis Suray 90+1'	Report	Silvester van der Water 38'; Fedde de Jong 88'	Stadium: Matchoholic Stadion; Attendance: 2,313; Referee: Rob Dieperink

15 October 2023 10th week	SC Cambuur	2–3	NAC Breda	Leeuwarden
16:45	Michael Breij 56' 79'; Marcel Schaapman (yellow card) 90+3'	Report	Tom Boere 29' (yellow card) 64'; Boy Kemper 37'; Jan Van den Bergh 45+2' (yellow card) 68'; Aimé Omgba (yellow card) 90+2'	Stadium: Cambuur Stadion; Attendance: 10,000; Referee: Bas Nijhuis

20 October 2023 11th week	MVV Maastricht	1–1	SC Cambuur	Maastricht
20:00	Bryan Smeets (yellow card) 13'; Koen Kostons 19'; Marko Kleinen (yellow card) 63'; Tunahan Taşçı (yellow card) 78'; Özgür Aktaş (yellow card) 79'	Report	Remco Balk (yellow card) 28'; Milan Smit 34'; Michael Breij (yellow card) 39'	Stadium: De Geusselt; Attendance: 5,003; Referee: Erwin Blank

29 October 2023 12th week	SC Cambuur	2–1	FC Groningen	Leeuwarden
12:15	Marco Tol 8'; Remco Balk (yellow card) 58' (goal) 83'; Michael Breij (yellow card) 59'	Report	Wouter Prins (yellow card) 43'; Luciano Valente 55'	Stadium: Cambuur Stadion; Attendance: 10,000; Referee: Joey Kooij

6 November 2023 13th week	TOP Oss	1–8	SC Cambuur	Oss
20:00	Roshon van Eijma 18' (pen.); Amine Rehmi (red card) 30'; Enrico Hernández (yellow card) 69'	Report	Roberts Uldriķis 3'; Milan Smit 33'; Gabi Caschili 41'; Daniël van Kaam 46'; Wiebe Kooistra 59'; Fedde de Jong 64'; Floris Smand 75'; Jeremy van Mullem 89'	Stadium: Frans Heesen Stadion; Attendance: 1,342; Referee: Martin Fernando Perezlindo

12 November 2023 14th week	ADO Den Haag	1–2	SC Cambuur	The Hague
14:30	Bart van Hintum (yellow card) 12'; Dhoraso Klas (yellow card) 52'; Joel Ideho (yellow card) 60'; Silvinho Esajas (red card) 63'; Henk Veerman 85' (pen.)	Report	Remco Balk (yellow card) 26'; Fedde de Jong 37'; Roberts Uldriķis 46'; Jeremy van Mullem (yellow card) 85'	Stadium: Bingoal Stadion; Attendance: 9,211; Referee: Erwin Blank

19 November 2023 15th week	SC Cambuur	1–1	Roda JC Kerkrade	Leeuwarden
14:30	Milan Smit 4'; Thomas Poll (yellow card) 10'; Daniël van Kaam (yellow card) 31'; Remco Balk (yellow card) 31'	Report	Walid Ould-Chikh 13' (pen.); Koen Bucker (yellow card) 43'; Enrique Peña Zauner (yellow card) 43'; Matisse Didden (yellow card) 58'	Stadium: Cambuur Stadion; Attendance: 9,820; Referee: Martijn Vos

24 November 2023 16th week	VVV-Venlo	1–2	SC Cambuur	Venlo
20:00	Dylan Timber (yellow card) 66'; Richard Sedláček 78' (yellow card) 90+4'	Report	Fedde de Jong 5'; Milan Smit 18' (yellow card) 90'; Léon Bergsma (yellow card) 46'; Daniël van Kaam (yellow card) 90+3'; Brett Minnema (yellow card) 90+5'	Stadium: Covebo Stadion; Attendance: 5,551; Referee: Alex Bos

1 December 2023 17th week	SC Cambuur	2–2	FC Eindhoven	Leeuwarden
20:00	Milan Smit 35' (pen.); Michael Breij 69'; Remco Balk (yellow card) 86'	Report	Evan Rottier 30'; Joey Sleegers 83'	Stadium: Cambuur Stadion; Attendance: 9,625; Referee: Martin van den Kerkhof

8 December 2023 18th week	De Graafschap	2–3	SC Cambuur	Doetinchem
20:00	Başar Önal 16'; Philip Brittijn (yellow card) 39'; Donny Warmerdam 90+4'	Report	Michael Breij 11'; Léon Bergsma (yellow card) 35'; Marco Tol 49'; Jeremy van Mullem (yellow card) 69'; Roberts Uldriķis 79'	Stadium: Stadion De Vijverberg; Attendance: 10,776; Referee: Rob Dieperink

15 December 2023 19th week	SC Cambuur	1–2	Jong AZ	Leeuwarden
20:00	Michael Breij (yellow card) 18'; Floris Smand (yellow card) 43'; Milan Smit 47'; Daniël van Kaam (yellow card) 52'; Marco Tol (yellow card) 84'	Report	Ricuenio Kewal 10' 88'; Maxim Dekker (yellow card) 18'; Ro-Zangelo Daal (yellow card) 41'; Loek Postma (yellow card) 90+6'	Stadium: Cambuur Stadion; Attendance: 9,482; Referee: Wouter Wiersma

22 December 2023 20th week	FC Den Bosch	3–1	SC Cambuur	Den Bosch
20:00	Kacper Kostorz 12'; Nick de Groot (yellow card) 46'; Stan Maas 68'; Rik Mulders (yellow card) 69'; Sebastiaan van Bakel 90+2'	Report	Floris Smand (yellow card) 36' (yellow-red card) 62'; Milan Smit 81' (yellow card) 86'	Stadium: De Vliert; Attendance: 4,117; Referee: Richard Martens

==== 2nd half ====
12 January 2024 21st week	SC Cambuur	5–2	MVV Maastricht	Leeuwarden
20:00	Roberts Uldrikis 2' 5'; Romain Matthys 11' (o.g.); Fedde de Jong 64'; Michael Breij 73'	Report	Dailon Livramento 78' 80'	Stadium: Cambuur Stadion; Attendance: 9,592; Referee: Laurens Gerrets

29 January 2024 22nd week	SC Cambuur	1–2	TOP Oss	Leeuwarden
20:00	Remco Balk 75'	Report	Arthur Allemeersch 79'; Roshon van Eijma 85'	Stadium: Cambuur Stadion; Attendance: 9,442; Referee: Jannick van der Laan

2 February 2024 23rd week	Willem II Tilburg	1–1	SC Cambuur	Tilburg
20:00	Thijs Oosting 22'	Report	Milan Smit 7' (pen.)	Stadium: Koning Willem II Stadion; Attendance: 13,579; Referee: Erwin Blank

10 February 2024 24th week	SC Cambuur	3–3	VVV-Venlo	Leeuwarden
16:30	Roberts Uldrikis 7' 88'; Rick Ketting 10' (o.g.)	Report	Martijn Berden 17'; Michalis Kosidis 29'; Milan Robberechts 90+1'	Stadium: Cambuur Stadion; Attendance: 9,607; Referee: Marc Nagtegaal

16 February 2024 25th week	SC Cambuur	2–4	Jong FC Utrecht	Leeuwarden
20:00	Jeremy van Mullem 32'; Milan Smit 84'	Report	Jesse van de Haar 45' 56'; Adrian Blake 50'; Lynden Edhart 85'	Stadium: Cambuur Stadion; Attendance: 9,462; Referee: Stan Teuben

19 February 2024 26th week	NAC Breda	1–2	SC Cambuur	Breda
20:00	Martin Koscelnik 56'	Report	Roberts Uldrikis 37' 71'	Stadium: Rat Verlegh Stadion; Attendance: 15,218; Referee: Joey Kooij

23 February 2024 27th week	FC Emmen	2–0	SC Cambuur	Emmen
20:00	Maikel Kieftenbeld 8'; Joey Konings 75'	Report		Stadium: De Oude Meerdijk; Attendance: 7,806; Referee: Ingmar Oostrom

4 March 2024 28th week	Jong PSV	3–1	SC Cambuur	Eindhoven
20:00	Jevon Simons 55'; Jesper Uneken 75'; Thomas Poll 79' (o.g.)	Report	Marco Tol 77'	Stadium: De Herdgang; Attendance: 459; Referee: Wouter Wiersma

8 March 2024 29th week	SC Cambuur	1–2	De Graafschap	Leeuwarden
20:00	Milan Smit 45+1'	Report	Xandro Schenk 35'; Philip Brittijn 85'	Stadium: Cambuur Stadion; Attendance: 9,861; Referee: Richard Martens

15 March 2024 30th week	Jong AZ	2–0	SC Cambuur	The Hague
20:00	Ernest Poku 27' 53'	Report		Stadium: AFAS Trainingscomplex; Attendance: 700; Referee: Luuk Timmer

23 March 2024 31st week	SC Cambuur	1–0	De Graafschap	Leeuwarden
20:00	Remco Balk 73'	Report		Stadium: Cambuur Stadion; Attendance: 9,630; Referee: Rob Dieperink

29 March 2024 32nd week	FC Eindhoven	0–3	SC Cambuur	Eindhoven
20:00		Report	Milan Smit 26'; Remco Balk 42'; Daniël van Kaam 72'	Stadium: Jan Louwers Stadion; Attendance: 2,714; Referee: Laurens Gerrets

5 April 2024 33rd week	SC Cambuur	0–2	ADO Den Haag	Leeuwarden
20:00		Report	Henk Veerman 50'; Dhoraso Klas 90+2'	Stadium: Cambuur Stadion; Attendance: 9,819; Referee: Stan Teuben

15 April 2024 34th week	Jong Ajax	2–1	SC Cambuur	Duivendrecht
20:00	Carlos Forbs 76'; Julian Rijkhoff 80'	Report	Remco Balk 90+3'	Stadium: Sportpark De Toekomst; Attendance: 595; Referee: Robin Vereijken

20 April 2024 35th week	FC Groningen	3–0	SC Cambuur	Groningen
21:00	Marvin Peersman 23'; Thom van Bergen 33'; Romano Postema 84'	Report		Stadium: Euroborg; Attendance: 22,118; Referee: Erwin Blank

26 April 2024 36th week	SC Cambuur	3–3	ADO Den Haag	Leeuwarden
20:00	Roberts Uldrikis 21' 32'; Milan Smit 49'	Report	Ilias Sebaoui 25'; Shiloh 't Zand 55'; Adrian Segecic 79'	Stadium: Cambuur Stadion; Attendance: 9,879; Referee: Edwin van de Graaf

3 May 2024 37th week	Roda JC Kerkrade	2–0	SC Cambuur	Kerkrade
20:00	Sami Ouaissa 65'; Václav Sejk 75'	Report		Stadium: Parkstad Limburg Stadion; Attendance: 16,355; Referee: Sander van der Eijk

10 May 2024 38th week	SC Cambuur	1–1	Helmond Sport	Leeuwarden
20:00	Roberts Uldrikis 25'	Report	Hakon Lorentzen 78'	Stadium: Cambuur Stadion; Attendance: 9,683; Referee: Michael Eijgelsheim

=== KNVB Cup ===
2 November 2023 1st round	SC Cambuur	4–1	MVV Maastricht	Leeuwarden
18:45	Sekou Sylla 25'; Milan Smit 28' (pen.); Michael Breij 40'; Roberts Uldriķis 45'; Gabi Caschili (yellow card) 50'	Report	Rayan Buifrahi 18'; Bryant Nieling (yellow card) 47'; Leroy Labylle (yellow card) 65'; Tunahan Taşçı (yellow card) 88'	Stadium: Cambuur Stadion; Attendance: 5,460; Referee: Jochem Kamphuis

19 December 2023 2nd round	FC Dordrecht	0–3	SC Cambuur	Dordrecht
20:00	Shiloh 't Zand (yellow card) 67'	Report	Sekou Sylla (yellow card) 8'; Remco Balk 24'; Roberts Uldriķis 58'; Jeremy van Mullem (yellow card) 71'; Daniël van Kaam 79'	Stadium: Matchoholic Stadion; Attendance: 1,958; Referee: Jannick van der Laan

25 January 2024 Round of 16	USV Hercules	3–4 (a.e.t.)	SC Cambuur	Utrecht
20:00	Oussama Lahri 3' (pen.) 60'; Mitchell Zwart 96'	Report	Milan Smit 80' (pen.) 93'; Matthias Nartey 82'; Michael Breij 120+1'	Stadium: Sportcomplex Zoudenbalch; Attendance: 1,100; Referee: Robin Hensgens, Richard Martens

7 February 2024 Quarter final	SC Cambuur	3–1	SBV Vitesse	Leeuwarden
18:45	Milan Smit 35' 88' (pen.); Fedde de Jong 81'	Report	Anis Hadj Moussa 79'	Stadium: Cambuur Stadion; Attendance: 9,697; Referee: Rob Dieperink

27 February 2024 Semi final	SC Cambuur	1–2 (a.e.t.)	NEC Nijmegen	Leeuwarden
20:00	Roberts Uldrikis 24'	Report	Koki Ogawa 60'; Kodai Sano 99'	Stadium: Cambuur Stadion; Attendance: 10,000; Referee: Sander van der Eijk

== Statistics ==
=== Scorers ===
#	Player	Eerste Divisie	KNVB	Total
1	(Netherlands) Milan Smit	19	5	24
2	(Latvia) Roberts Uldrikis	12	3	15
3	(Netherlands) Michael Breij	9	2	11
4	(Netherlands) Remco Balk	8	1	9
5	(Netherlands) Fedde de Jong	5	1	6
6	(Netherlands) Daniël Van Kaam	2	1	3
6	(Netherlands) Marco Tol	3	0	3
6	(Netherlands) Silvester van der Water	3	0	3
9	(Netherlands) Jeremy van Mullem	2	0	2
9	(Netherlands) Wiebe Kooistra	2	0	2
9	(Italy) Youns El Hilali	2	0	2
12	(Netherlands) Floris Smand	1	0	1
12	(Netherlands) Gabi Caschili	1	0	1
12	(Netherlands) Matthias Nartey	0	1	1
12	(Guinea) Sekou Sylla	0	1	1

=== Appearances ===
#	Player	Eerste Divisie	KNVB	Total
1	(Netherlands) Marco Tol	37	5	42
2	(Netherlands) Daniël Van Kaam	36	5	41
2	(Netherlands) Fedde de Jong	36	5	41
2	(Netherlands) Milan Smit	36	5	41
2	(Netherlands) Yanick van Osch	36	5	41
6	(Netherlands) Remco Balk	33	5	38
7	(Latvia) Roberts Uldrikis	32	5	37
8	(Netherlands) Floris Smand	32	3	35
9	(Netherlands) Michael Breij	29	5	34
10	(Netherlands) Léon Bergsma	28	4	32
11	(Netherlands) Jeremy van Mullem	26	5	31
12	(Netherlands) Thomas Poll	25	4	29
12	(Netherlands) Wiebe Kooistra	26	3	29
14	(Guinea) Sekou Sylla	25	3	28
15	(Haiti) Jhondly van der Meer	19	3	22
16	(Netherlands) Gabi Caschili	15	1	16
16	(Norway) Sturla Ottesen	15	1	16
16	(Italy) Youns El Hilali	16	0	16
19	(Netherlands) Matthias Nartey	11	1	12
19	(Curaçao) Tyrique Mercera	10	2	12
21	(United States) Agustin Anello	9	0	9
21	(Netherlands) Marcel Schaapman	7	2	9
21	(Netherlands) Silvester van der Water	9	0	9
24	(Netherlands) Yorem van der Veen	6	2	8
25	(Netherlands) Vincent Pichel	4	2	6
26	(Netherlands) Milan de Koe	5	0	5
27	(Netherlands) Toni Jonker	3	1	4
27	(Netherlands) Vito Wormgoor	2	2	4
29	(Sierra Leone) Alex Bangura	3	0	3
29	(Netherlands) Chima Anyasi	3	0	3
29	(Netherlands) Myles Veldman	3	0	3
32	(Netherlands) Daan Reiziger	2	0	2
32	(Netherlands) Iwan Henstra	1	1	2
32	(Netherlands) Tom van der Werff	2	0	2
35	(Netherlands) Bram Marsman	1	0	1

=== Clean sheets ===
#	Player	Eerste Divisie	KNVB Cup	Total
1	(Netherlands) Yanick van Osch	2	1	3

=== Disciplinary record ===
#	Player	Eerste Divisie		KNVB		Total	
#	Player	Booked	Sent off (straight red)	Booked	Sent off (straight red)	Booked	Sent off (straight red)
1	(Guinea) Sekou Sylla	1	1	2	0	3	1
2	(Netherlands) Floris Smand	2	1	0	0	2	1
3	(Netherlands) Remco Balk	13	0	0	0	13	0
4	(Netherlands) Milan Smit	8	0	1	0	9	0
5	(Netherlands) Jeremy van Mullem	5	0	2	0	7	0
5	(Netherlands) Michael Breij	5	0	2	0	7	0
7	(Netherlands) Daniël Van Kaam	4	0	1	0	5	0
8	(Netherlands) Gabi Caschili	3	0	1	0	4	0
9	(Netherlands) Fedde de Jong	3	0	0	0	3	0
9	(Netherlands) Léon Bergsma	3	0	0	0	3	0
9	(Netherlands) Marco Tol	3	0	0	0	3	0
12	(Haiti) Jhondly van der Meer	2	0	0	0	2	0
12	(Latvia) Roberts Uldrikis	2	0	0	0	2	0
12	(Norway) Sturla Ottesen	2	0	0	0	2	0
12	(Netherlands) Thomas Poll	2	0	0	0	2	0
12	(Curaçao) Tyrique Mercera	2	0	0	0	2	0
12	(Netherlands) Yanick van Osch	2	0	0	0	2	0
12	(Italy) Youns El Hilali	2	0	0	0	2	0
19	(Sierra Leone) Alex Bangura	1	0	0	0	1	0
19	(United States) Agustin Anello	1	0	0	0	1	0
19	(Netherlands) Brett Minnema	1	0	0	0	1	0
19	(Netherlands) Marcel Schaapman	1	0	0	0	1	0
19	(Netherlands) Silvester van der Water	1	0	0	0	1	0
19	(Netherlands) Toni Jonker	1	0	0	0	1	0
19	(Netherlands) Vincent Pichel	0	0	1	0	1	0
