= 2022–23 SC Cambuur season =

Dutch football club season

SC Cambuur
2022–23 season
- Chairman: Cees Heijboer
- Head coach: Henk de Jong (until 20 October 2022); Pascal Bosschaart (interim); Sjors Ultee (from 11 November 2022)
- Stadium: Cambuur Stadion
- Eredivisie: 17th (relegated)
- KNVB Cup: 2nd round
- Top goalscorer: League: Bjørn Johnsen; Mees Hoedemakers (3 goals); All: Bjørn Johnsen; Mees Hoedemakers (3 goals)
- Highest home attendance: 10,000 (Week 4, Week 6, Week 8, Week 11, Week 12, Week 20, Week 22)
- Lowest home attendance: 9,600 (Week 24, Week 27, Week 29, Week 31, Week 34)
- Average home league attendance: 9,821
- Biggest win: 4-0 RKC Waalwijk (h) Week 38
- Biggest defeat: 5-0 AFC Ajax (a) Week 20
Home colours	Away colours

The 2022–23 season was SC Cambuur's 17th season in the Eredivisie (2nd consecutive). SC Cambuur finished the regular season in 17th place and relegated to Eerste Divisie

The club also competed in the KNVB Cup, where they were eliminated in the second round following a 1–0 defeat to De Treffers.

Bjørn Johnsen and Mees Hoedemakers were the top scorers of the club in this season each with 3 goals in Eredivisie.

Michael Breij was the most appeared player in this season with 34 appearances; 32 appearances in the Eredivisie and 2 appearances in the KNVB Cup.

== Players ==
As of 31 January 2023

Note: Flags indicate national team as defined under FIFA eligibility rules; some limited exceptions apply. Players may hold more than one non-FIFA nationality.

No.	Pos.	Nation	Player
1	GK	POR	João Virgínia
2	MF	NED	Jasper ter Heide
3	DF	SUR	Calvin Mac-Intosch
4	DF	NED	Léon Bergsma
5	DF	NED	Doke Schmidt
6	MF	NED	Mees Hoedemakers
7	FW	SUI	Felix Mambimbi
8	MF	NED	Jamie Jacobs
9	FW	NOR	Bjørn Johnsen
9	FW	NED	Tom Boere
10	MF	NED	Mitchel Paulissen
11	FW	NED	Silvester van der Water
12	GK	NED	Robbin Ruiter
14	MF	NED	Michael Breij
15	DF	NED	Marco Tol

No.	Pos.	Nation	Player
16	DF	SLE	Alex Bangura
17	MF	NED	Ben Rienstra
18	FW	GAB	David Sambissa
19	MF	NED	Navarone Foor
20	MF	FRA	Robin Maulun
21	MF	NED	Daniël van Kaam
24	DF	JPN	Sai van Wermeskerken
25	FW	MAR	Mimoun Mahi
27	DF	GUI	Sekou Sylla
28	FW	LAT	Roberts Uldriķis (captain)
30	FW	NED	Remco Balk
31	GK	NED	Brett Minnema
33	DF	NED	Floris Smand
38	MF	NED	Vincent Pichel
39	FW	NED	Milan Smit

== Transfers ==
=== In ===
Pos.	Player	Transferred from	Fee	Date
FW	(Netherlands) Remco Balk	(Netherlands) FC Utrecht	On loan	1 July 2022
FW	(Netherlands) Silvester van der Water	(United States) Orlando City SC	€550,000	1 July 2022
GK	(Portugal) João Virgínia	(England) Everton F.C.	On loan	8 July 2022
GK	(Netherlands) Robbin Ruiter	No club		23 July 2022
DF	(Netherlands) Leon Bergsma	(Switzerland) FC Aarau		28 July 2022
DF	(Japan) Sai van Wermeskerken	(Netherlands) PEC Zwolle	Free	10 August 2022
DF	(Netherlands) Daniël van Kaam	(Netherlands) FC Groningen		31 August 2022
FW	(Switzerland) Felix Mambimbi	(Switzerland) BSC Young Boys	On loan	31 August 2022
FW	(Morocco) Mimoun Mahi	(Netherlands) FC Utrecht	On loan	17 January 2023
MF	(Netherlands) Ben Rienstra	No club		27 January 2023
MF	(Netherlands) Navarone Foor	(Latvia) Riga FC	Free	30 January 2023
FW	(Norway) Bjørn Johnsen	(Canada) CF Montréal	Free	31 January 2023

=== Out ===
Pos.	Player	Transferred to	Fee	Date
FW	(Netherlands) Patrick Joosten	(Netherlands) FC Groningen	End of loan	30 June 2022
MF	(Hungary) Tamás Kiss	(Hungary) Puskás Akadémia FC	End of loan	30 June 2022
DF	(Netherlands) Erik Schouten	(Netherlands) Willem II Tilburg	Free	1 July 2022
FW	(Netherlands) Nick Doodeman	(Netherlands) Willem II Tilburg		1 July 2022
FW	(Sierra Leone) Issa Kallon	(Chile) Shanghai Port F.C.	Free	1 August 2022
GK	(Netherlands) Sonny Stevens	(Greece) OFI Crete F.C.	Free	10 August 2022
DF	(Netherlands) Thomas Rier	(Malta) St. Lucia F.C.	Free	16 August 2022
FW	(Netherlands) Sam Hendriks	(Cyprus) Olympiakos Nicosia	Free	26 August 2022
FW	(Netherlands) Tom Boere	(Netherlands) NAC Breda		26 January 2023
MF	(Netherlands) Jasper ter Heide	No club		31 January 2023

== Pre-season and friendlies ==
Win Draw Loss Fixtures

16 July 2022 Friendly	SC Cambuur (Netherlands)	2–1	(Netherlands) SC Telstar	Sneek, Netherlands
17:00				Stadium: Zuidersportpark

30 July 2022 Friendly	RKC Waalwijk (Netherlands)	1–1	(Netherlands) SC Cambuur	Waalwijk, Netherlands
18:00				Stadium: Mandemakers Stadion

22 July 2022 Friendly	PEC Zwolle (Netherlands)	3–1	(Netherlands) SC Cambuur	Zwolle, Netherlands
19:00				Stadium: MAC³PARK Stadion

4 December 2022 Friendly	SC Cambuur (Netherlands)	1–1	(Netherlands) Heracles Almelo	Leeuwarden, Netherlands
13:30	Maxwell Rodrigues 6'		Sem Scheperman 65'	Stadium: Cambuur Stadion

9 December 2022 Friendly	FC Groningen (Netherlands)	1–1	(Netherlands) SC Cambuur	Groningen, Netherlands
13:00				Stadium: Sportpark Corpus den Hoorn

16 December 2022 Friendly	SC Cambuur (Netherlands)	0–2	(France) Lille OSC	San Pedro del Pinatar, Spain
11:00				Stadium: Pinatar Arena

== Competitions ==
=== Overall record ===
Competition	First match	Last match	Starting round	Final position	Record							
Competition	First match	Last match	Starting round	Final position	Pld	W	D	L	GF	GA	GD	Win %
Eredivisie	7 August 2022	28 May 2023	Matchday 1	17th	34	5	4	25	26	69	−43	14.71
KNVB Cup	19 October 2022	11 January 2023	First round	Second round	2	1	0	1	3	1	+2	50.00
Total					36	6	4	26	29	70	−41	16.67

Source: Soccerway

=== Eredivisie ===
==== League table ====
Pos	Team	Pld	W	D	L	GF	GA	GD	Pts	Qualification or relegation
14	Volendam	34	10	6	18	42	71	−29	36	
15	Excelsior	34	9	5	20	32	71	−39	32	
16	Emmen (R)	34	6	10	18	33	65	−32	28	Qualification to Relegation play-offs
17	Cambuur (R)	34	5	4	25	26	69	−43	19	Relegation to Eerste Divisie
18	Groningen (R)	34	4	6	24	31	75	−44	18	Relegation to Eerste Divisie

Source: Eredivisie
Rules for classification: Season in progress: 1) Most points won; 2) Less points lost; 3) Goal difference; 4) Goals scored; 5) Alphabetical order; End of season: 1) Points; 2) Goal difference; 3) Goals scored; 4) Head-to-head points; 5) Head-to-head goal difference; 6) Head-to-head away goals scored; 7) Play-off if relevant for deciding champion, relegation or participating in a European league, otherwise by draw. 8) Penalty shoot-out (only after a play-off)
(R) Relegated

==== Results summary ====
Overall								Home						Away					
Pld	W	D	L	GF	GA	GD	Pts	W	D	L	GF	GA	GD	W	D	L	GF	GA	GD
34	5	4	25	26	69	−43	19	3	0	14	14	33	−19	2	4	11	12	36	−24

Last updated: 19 December 2025.
Source: 2022-23 Eredivisie Stand

==== Results by round ====
Round	1	2	3	4	5	6	7	8	9	10	11	12	13	14	15	16	17	18	19	20	21	22	23	24	25	26	27	28	29	30	31	32	33	34
Ground	H	A	A	H	A	H	A	H	A	H	H	H	A	A	H	A	H	A	H	H	A	H	A	H	A	A	H	A	H	A	H	A	A	H
Result	L	D	W	L	L	L	L	W	D	L	L	L	L	L	L	D	L	W	L	L	D	L	L	W	L	L	L	L	L	L	L	L	L	W
Position																																		17

Source: 2022-23 Eredivisie Stand
A = Away; H = Home; W = Win; D = Draw; L = Loss

=== Matches ===
The league fixtures were announced on 17 June 2022.

==== 1st half ====
6 August 2022 1st week	SC Cambuur	0-2	Excelsior Rotterdam	Leeuwarden
18:45		Report	Marouan Azarkan 10'; Julian Baas 44'	Stadium: Cambuur Stadion; Attendance: 9,671; Referee: Edwin van de Graaf

13 August 2022 2nd week	FC Utrecht	0-0	SC Cambuur	Utrecht
20:00		Report		Stadium: Stadion Galgenwaard; Attendance: 21,019; Referee: Erwin Blank

20 August 2022 3rd week	Fortuna Sittard	1-4	SC Cambuur	Sittard
18:45	Burak Yilmaz 10'	Report	Michael Breij 47'; Mees Hoedemakers 79' 87'; Jasper ter Heide 90+2'	Stadium: Fortuna Sittard Stadion; Attendance: 8,357; Referee: Bas Nijhuis

28 August 2022 4th week	SC Cambuur	0-1	AZ Alkmaar	Leeuwarden
16:45		Report	Jordy Clasie 90'	Stadium: Cambuur Stadion; Attendance: 10,000; Referee: Rob Dieperink

3 September 2022 5th week	AFC Ajax	4-0	SC Cambuur	Amsterdam
16:30		Report	Steven Bergwijn 35' 40'; Devyne Rensch 53'; Mohammed Kudus 64'	Stadium: Johan Cruijff Arena; Attendance: 53,667; Referee: Joey Kooij

11 September 2022 6th week	SC Cambuur	0-1	FC Groningen	Leeuwarden
14:30		Report	Tomáš Suslov 71'	Stadium: Cambuur Stadion; Attendance: 10,000; Referee: Dennis Higler

17 September 2022 7th week	RKC Waalwijk	5-1	SC Cambuur	Waalwijk
20:00	Michiel Kramer 32' (pen.) 89'; Marco Tol 77' (o.g.); Zakaria Bakkali 82'; Iliass Bel Hassani 86'	Report	Jamie Jacobs 17'	Stadium: Mandemakers Stadion; Attendance: 4,555; Referee: Sander van der Eijk

1 October 2022 8th week	SC Cambuur	3-0	PSV Eindhoven	Leeuwarden
16:30	Silvester van der Water 54'; Mitchell Paulissen 84'; Sai van Wermeskerken 90'	Report		Stadium: Cambuur Stadion; Attendance: 10,000; Referee: Pol van Boekel

9 October 2022 9th week	Go Ahead Eagles	0-0	SC Cambuur	Deventer
12:15		Report		Stadium: De Adelaarshorst; Attendance: 9,603; Referee: Edwin van de Graaf

15 October 2022 10th week	SC Cambuur	0-3	SBV Vitesse	Leeuwarden
21:00		Report	Ryan Flamingo 20'; Kacper Kozlowski 74'; Sondre Tronstad 82'	Stadium: Cambuur Stadion; Attendance: 9,868; Referee: Laurens Gerrets

23 October 2022 11th week	SC Cambuur	0-1	FC Twente	Leeuwarden
14:30		Report	Ricky van Wolfswinkel 90+7' (pen.)	Stadium: Cambuur Stadion; Attendance: 10,000; Referee: Jochem Kamphuis

4 November 2022 12th week	SC Cambuur	0-1	NEC Nijmegen	Leeuwarden
20:00		Report	Lasse Schöne 44'	Stadium: Cambuur Stadion; Attendance: 10,000; Referee: Jannick van der Laan

10 November 2022 13th week	Feyenoord	1-0	SC Cambuur	Rotterdam
20:00	Quilindschy Hartman 4'	Report		Stadium: De Kuip; Attendance: 47,500; Referee: Jeroen Manschot

13 November 2022 14th week	SC Heerenveen	2-1	SC Cambuur	Heerenveen
14:30	Amin Sarr 36'; Anas Tahiri 81'	Report	Jamie Jacobs 10'	Stadium: Abe Lenstra Stadion; Attendance: 23,800; Referee: Allard Lindhout

==== 2nd half ====
8 January 2023 15th week	SC Cambuur	0-3	FC Volendam	Leeuwarden
14:30		Report	Bilal Ould-Chikh 8'; Robert Mühren 9'; Henk Veerman 74'	Stadium: Cambuur Stadion; Attendance: 9,828; Referee: Richard Martens

15 January 2023 16th week	FC Emmen	0-0	SC Cambuur	Emmen
16:45		Report		Stadium: De Oude Meerdijk; Attendance: 8,135; Referee: Rob Dieperink

21 January 2023 17th week	SC Cambuur	0-3	Sparta Rotterdam	Leeuwarden
20:00		Report	Tobias Lauritsen 9'; Koki Saito 18'; Vito van Crooij 51' (pen.)	Stadium: Cambuur Stadion; Attendance: 9,841; Referee: Jochem Kamphuis

26 January 2023 18th week	FC Groningen	0-1	SC Cambuur	Groningen
18:45		Report	Daniël Van Kaam 77'	Stadium: Euroborg; Attendance: 18,918; Referee: Bas Nijhuis

29 January 2023 19th week	SC Cambuur	1-2	Fortuna Sittard	Leeuwarden
16:45	Mees Hoedemakers 31'	Report	Burak Yilmaz 75' (pen.); Iñigo Córdoba 84'	Stadium: Cambuur Stadion; Attendance: 9,755; Referee: Jeroen Manschot

5 February 2023 20th week	SC Cambuur	0-5	AFC Ajax	Leeuwarden
12:15		Report	Dusan Tadic 16'; Steven Berghuis 36' 64'; Brian Brobbey 79' 90+3'	Stadium: Cambuur Stadion; Attendance: 10,000; Referee: Martin van den Kerkhof

11 February 2023 21st week	NEC Nijmegen	0-0	SC Cambuur	Nijmegen
18:45		Report		Stadium: Goffertstadion; Attendance: 12,324; Referee: Serdar Gözübüyük

19 February 2023 22nd week	SC Cambuur	1-2	SC Heerenveen	Leeuwarden
12:15	Bjørn Johnsen 1'	Report	Osame Sahraoui 22'; Milan van Ewijk 65'	Stadium: Cambuur Stadion; Attendance: 10,000; Referee: Danny Makkelie

25 February 2023 23rd week	AZ Alkmaar	2-1	SC Cambuur	Alkmaar
20:00	Vangelis Pavlidis 40'; Wouter Goes 73'	Report	Bjørn Johnsen 85' (pen.)	Stadium: AFAS Stadion; Attendance: 16,869; Referee: Marc Nagtegaal

5 March 2023 24th week	SC Cambuur	4-1	Go Ahead Eagles	Leeuwarden
20:00	Michael Breij 13'; Mimoun Mahi 43'; Bjørn Johnsen 57'; Navarone Foor 74'	Report	Mats Deijl 25'	Stadium: Cambuur Stadion; Attendance: 9,600; Referee: Allard Lindhout

12 March 2023 25th week	PSV Eindhoven	5-2	SC Cambuur	Eindhoven
16:45	Xavi Simons 25'; Patrick van Aanholt 54'; Anwar El Ghazi 56' 88'; Fábio Silva 65' (pen.)	Report	Remco Balk 22'; Ibrahim Sangaré 61' (o.g.)	Stadium: Philips Stadion; Attendance: 30,167; Referee: Jannick van der Laan

19 March 2023 26th week	Excelsior Rotterdam	4-1	SC Cambuur	Rotterdam
14:30	Kenzo Goudmijn 6'; Léon Bergsma 10' (o.g.); Siebe Horemans 20'; Lazaros Lamprou 33'	Report	Alex Bangura 50'	Stadium: Stadion Woudestein; Attendance: 4,100; Referee: Jeroen Manschot

1 April 2023 27th week	SC Cambuur	1-2	FC Emmen	Leeuwarden
20:00	Mitchell Paulissen 68'	Report	Ahmed El Messaoudi 78'; Jeroen Veldmate 90+2'	Stadium: Cambuur Stadion; Attendance: 9,600; Referee: Danny Makkelie

9 April 2023 28th week	FC Twente	4-0	SC Cambuur	Enschede
12:15	Ricky van Wolfswinkel 12'; Michel Vlap 28'; Sem Steijn 36'; Joshua Brenet 77'	Report		Stadium: De Grolsch Veste; Attendance: 29,000; Referee: Serdar Gözübüyük

16 April 2023 29th week	SC Cambuur	0-3	Feyenoord	Leeuwarden
16:45		Report	Santiago Gimenez 17'; Sebastian Szymański 51'; Calvin Mac-Intosch 64' (o.g.)	Stadium: Cambuur Stadion; Attendance: 9,600; Referee: Bas Nijhuis

21 April 2023 30th week	FC Volendam	2-0	SC Cambuur	Volendam
20:00	Damon Mirani 39' 90'	Report		Stadium: Kras Stadion; Attendance: 6,760; Referee: Alex Bos

6 May 2023 31st week	SC Cambuur	0-3	FC Utrecht	Leeuwarden
20:00		Report	Sander van de Streek 37'; Anastasios Douvikas 41' 64' (pen.)	Stadium: Cambuur Stadion; Attendance: 9,600; Referee: Jochem Kamphuis

14 May 2023 32nd week	SBV Vitesse	2-0	SC Cambuur	Arnhem
12:15	Bartosz Białek 56' 61'	Report		Stadium: Gelredome; Attendance: 16,082; Referee: Erwin Blank

21 May 2023 33rd week	Sparta Rotterdam	4-1	SC Cambuur	Rotterdam
14:30	Koki Saito 30'; Mica Pinto 38'; Joshua Kitolano 42'; Younes Namli 50'	Report	Marco Tol 9'	Stadium: Het Kasteel; Attendance: 9,731; Referee: Richard Martens

28 May 2023 34th week	SC Cambuur	4-0	RKC Waalwijk	Leeuwarden
14:30	Roberts Uldrikis 45+5'; David Sambissa 45+7'; Navarone Foor 55'; Milan Smit 67'	Report		Stadium: Cambuur Stadion; Attendance: 9,600; Referee: Edwin van de Graaf

=== KNVB Cup ===
19 October 2022 1st round	FC Rijnvogels	0-3	SC Cambuur	Katwijk
20:00		Report	Silvester van der Water 54'; Milan Smit 71'; Remco Balk 90+1'	Stadium: Sportpark De Krom; Attendance: 1,500; Referee: Stan Teuben

11 January 2023 2nd round	De Treffers	1-0	SC Cambuur	Sportpark Zuid
20:00	Willem den Dekker 30'	Report		Stadium: Sportpark Zuid; Attendance: 2,150; Referee: Joey Kooij

== Statistics ==
=== Scorers ===
#	Player	Eerste Divisie	KNVB	Total
1	(Norway) Bjørn Johnsen	3	0	3
1	(Netherlands) Mees Hoedemakers	3	0	3
3	(Netherlands) Jamie Jacobs	2	0	2
3	(Netherlands) Michael Breij	2	0	2
3	(Netherlands) Milan Smit	1	1	2
3	(Netherlands) Mitchell Paulissen	2	0	2
3	(Netherlands) Navarone Foor	2	0	2
3	(Netherlands) Remco Balk	1	1	2
3	(Netherlands) Silvester van der Water	1	1	2
10	(Sierra Leone) Alex Bangura	1	0	1
10	(Netherlands) Daniël Van Kaam	1	0	1
10	(Gabon) David Sambissa	1	0	1
10	(Netherlands) Jasper ter Heide	1	0	1
10	(Netherlands) Marco Tol	1	0	1
10	(Morocco) Mimoun Mahi	1	0	1
10	(Latvia) Roberts Uldrikis	1	0	1
10	(Japan) Sai van Wermeskerken	1	0	1

=== Appearances ===
#	Player	Eerste Divisie	KNVB	Total
1	(Netherlands) Michael Breij	32	2	34
2	(Netherlands) Remco Balk	30	2	32
3	(Sierra Leone) Alex Bangura	29	2	31
3	(Netherlands) Mees Hoedemakers	29	2	31
3	(Netherlands) Mitchell Paulissen	29	2	31
6	(Latvia) Roberts Uldrikis	28	1	29
7	(Netherlands) Daniël Van Kaam	26	2	28
7	(Netherlands) Jamie Jacobs	27	1	28
9	(Netherlands) Doke Schmidt	25	2	27
10	(Netherlands) Marco Tol	24	2	26
11	(Japan) Sai van Wermeskerken	24	1	25
12	(Netherlands) Floris Smand	23	1	24
12	(Netherlands) Léon Bergsma	24	0	24
12	(Netherlands) Silvester van der Water	23	1	24
15	(Gabon) David Sambissa	19	2	21
16	(Portugal) João Virgínia	17	1	18
17	(Netherlands) Robbin Ruiter	16	1	17
18	(Netherlands) Milan Smit	13	2	15
18	(Netherlands) Navarone Foor	15	0	15
20	(Netherlands) Tom Boere	13	1	14
21	(Norway) Bjørn Johnsen	13	0	13
21	(Suriname) Calvin Mac-Intosch	11	2	13
23	(Morocco) Mimoun Mahi	12	0	12
24	(Switzerland) Felix Mambimbi	8	1	9
25	(France) Robin Maulun	7	1	8
26	(Guinea-Bissau) Sekou Sylla	5	0	5
27	(Netherlands) Ben Rienstra	4	0	4
27	(Netherlands) Jasper ter Heide	4	0	4
27	(Netherlands) Vincent Pichel	4	0	4
30	(Netherlands) Brett Minnema	1	0	1

=== Clean sheets ===
#	Player	Eerste Divisie	KNVB Cup	Total
1	(Portugal) João Virgínia	4	0	4
2	(Netherlands) Robbin Ruiter	3	1	4
Total		7	1	8

=== Disciplinary record ===
#	Player	Eerste Divisie		KNVB		Total	
#	Player	Yellow card	Red card	Yellow card	Red card	Yellow card	Red card
1	(Netherlands) Mees Hoedemakers	1	2	1	0	2	2
2	(Sierra Leone) Alex Bangura	5	1	0	0	5	1
3	(Netherlands) Jamie Jacobs	2	1	0	0	2	1
4	(Portugal) João Virgínia	0	0	0	1	0	1
5	(Netherlands) Mitchell Paulissen	5	0	2	0	7	0
6	(Netherlands) Doke Schmidt	5	0	0	0	5	0
6	(Netherlands) Remco Balk	5	0	0	0	5	0
8	(Netherlands) Léon Bergsma	4	0	0	0	4	0
8	(Latvia) Roberts Uldrikis	4	0	0	0	4	0
10	(Suriname) Calvin Mac-Intosch	1	0	2	0	3	0
10	(Netherlands) Michael Breij	3	0	0	0	3	0
10	(Netherlands) Silvester van der Water	3	0	0	0	3	0
13	(Netherlands) Navarone Foor	2	0	0	0	2	0
14	(Netherlands) Daniël Van Kaam	1	0	0	0	1	0
14	(Gabon) David Sambissa	1	0	0	0	1	0
14	(Netherlands) Marco Tol	1	0	0	0	1	0
14	(Morocco) Mimoun Mahi	1	0	0	0	1	0
14	(Japan) Sai van Wermeskerken	1	0	0	0	1	0
14	(Netherlands) Tom Boere	1	0	0	0	1	0
14	(Netherlands) Vincent Pichel	1	0	0	0	1	0
