= Wiebe Kooistra =

Dutch footballer (born 2006)

Personal information
- Date of birth: 23 July 2006 (age 20)
- Place of birth: Harkema, Netherlands
- Height: 1.76 m (5 ft 9 in)
- Position: Winger

Team information
- Current team: Cambuur
- Number: 27

Youth career
- –2020: Harkemase Boys
- 2020–2023: Cambuur

Senior career*
Years	Team	Apps	(Gls)
2023–	Cambuur	62	(3)
- * Club domestic league appearances and goals as of 28 April 2026

Wiebe Kooistra (born 23 July 2006) is a Dutch professional footballer who plays as a winger for Eredivisie club Cambuur.

== Career ==
=== Cambuur ===
==== Early years ====
Kooistra began playing football at amateur club Harkemase Boys from his hometown Harkema. In the summer of 2020, he joined the youth academy of Cambuur from Harkemase Boys, progressing through the club's under-16 and under-18 teams. With the under-16 side, he finished as the team's top scorer, while during the 2022–23 season he was a regular player for the under-18 team. On 30 June 2023, Kooistra signed his first professional contract with Cambuur, running for two seasons with an option for an additional year.

==== First-team ====
Kooistra joined the first team during the 2023–24 pre-season and made his unofficial senior debut in a friendly against German fourth-tier side SSV Jeddeloh, starting in a 3–0 victory. He scored his first senior goal one week later in another friendly, against his former club Harkemase Boys.

Under head coach Sjors Ultee, Kooistra completed the entire pre-season with the first team. He made his competitive debut on 11 August 2023 in the opening match of the Eerste Divisie season against Emmen, coming on as a substitute in the second half. In stoppage time, he scored his first professional goal to equalise and secure a 2–2 draw for Cambuur.

During his first professional season, Kooistra was mainly used as a substitute, making 29 league appearances and starting on two occasions. His first start came on 6 November 2023 under Ultee's successor Henk de Jong, in an away match against TOP Oss. He contributed one goal and one assist in an 8–1 victory, earning a place in the Eerste Divisie Team of the Week. Cambuur finished the season in 13th place in the league and reached the semi-finals of the KNVB Cup, where they were eliminated by NEC. Kooistra made three substitute appearances during the cup run. Alongside his first-team involvement, he also featured regularly for Cambuur's under-21 team in the national under-21 competition.

In July 2024, Kooistra signed a new contract with Cambuur, extending his deal until 2027. He was named in the matchday squad for the opening fixtures of the season before making his first appearance of the campaign on 13 September 2024, in a league match against Jong Ajax. He featured sparingly during the 2024–25 season, making 11 league appearances, mostly as a late substitute. In addition, he played twice in the KNVB Cup, scoring once, and made a substitute appearance in one leg of Cambuur's two-legged defeat to FC Den Bosch in the promotion play-offs. During the summer of 2025, Kooistra declined an offer from Czech First League club MFK Karviná, a cooperation club of Slavia Prague, opting to remain at Cambuur.

== Career statistics ==
As of match played 16 January 2026

Appearances and goals by club, season and competition
Club	Season	League			National cup		Other		Total	
Club	Season	Division	Apps	Goals	Apps	Goals	Apps	Goals	Apps	Goals
Cambuur	2023–24	Eerste Divisie	26	2	3	0	—		29	2
Cambuur	2024–25	Eerste Divisie	11	0	2	1	1 (Note: Appearance in Eredivisie promotion/relegation playoffs)	0	14	1
Cambuur	2025–26	Eerste Divisie	14	1	1	0	—		15	1
Career total			51	3	6	1	1	0	58	4
