= Gabi Caschili =

Dutch footballer (born 2003)

Gabi Caschilli
- Caschili with Telstar in 2026

Personal information
- Full name: Gabrielle Caschili
- Date of birth: 14 July 2003 (age 23)
- Place of birth: Emmen, Netherlands
- Height: 1.71 m (5 ft 7 in)
- Position: Right-back

Team information
- Current team: Telstar
- Number: 18

Youth career
- –2014: Twente
- 2014–2021: PEC Zwolle

Senior career*
| Years | Team | Apps | (Gls) |
| 2021–2023 | PEC Zwolle | 14 | (1) |
| 2023–2025 | Cambuur | 17 | (1) |
| 2026– | Telstar | 6 | (0) |

International career^{‡}
| 2019 | Netherlands U16 | 3 | (0) |
| 2019 | Netherlands U17 | 7 | (0) |
| 2021–2022 | Netherlands U19 | 5 | (1) |
- * Club domestic league appearances and goals as of 10:03, 10 November 2026 (UTC) ‡ National team caps and goals as of 4 June 2022

Gabrielle "Gabi" Caschili (born 14 July 2003) is a Dutch professional footballer who plays as a right-back for Eredivisie club Telstar.

== Club career ==
=== PEC Zwolle ===
Caschili started playing football at Twente's academy, before moving to PEC Zwolle at under-12 level. In September 2019, he signed his first professional contract; a three-year deal. Around the same time, he started training with the first-team squad. He made his professional debut on 14 December 2021, replacing Luka Adžić in the 69th minute of a 4–0 KNVB Cup victory against MVV.

On 21 August 2022, Caschili scored his first professional goal, contributing to Zwolle's 4–0 away win over VVV-Venlo. He scored once in 17 total appearances for PEC.

=== Cambuur ===
On 25 July 2023, Caschili signed a two-year contract with Cambuur, with an optional third year. He made his debut on 18 August, coming on as a second-half substitute for Milan Smit in a 3–2 away victory against Telstar. He made his first start for the club a week later, featuring at right-back in a 4–2 home win over Jong Ajax. He subsequently became a regular starter in the position, and on 6 November, he scored his first goal for Cambuur in an 8–1 away win over TOP Oss, the latter's heaviest home defeat on record. On 24 November, during a match against VVV-Venlo, Caschili sustained a serious knee injury that ruled him out for the remainder of the season.

Cambuur had initially offered Caschili a contract extension, but withdrew it in July 2025 after he was involved in an altercation at an amateur match between FC Surhústerfean and WKE '16. The club cited both the incident and his expected unavailability through injury.

=== Telstar ===
On 4 August 2026, Caschili signed a one-year contract with Eredivisie club Telstar, with an option for a further season. He had been without a club since leaving Cambuur and had trained with Telstar through pre-season before signing; the move reunited him with coach Henk Brugge, under whom he had played at PEC Zwolle's academy.

== Style of play ==
Caschili is a versatile player, having transitioned from midfield positions to excelling as a right-back during his first year at Cambuur. His technical prowess and adaptability earned him praise from Cambuur's coach Henk de Jong, who emphasised his tenacity and speed on the field, likening him to former Heerenveen player Maarten de Jong.

== Personal life ==
Caschili was born in the Netherlands to a Serbian mother and an Italian father.

== Career statistics ==
As of match played 7 November 2026

Appearances and goals by club, season and competition
| Club | Season | League | | | KNVB Cup | | Other | | Total | |
| Club | Season | Division | Apps | Goals | Apps | Goals | Apps | Goals | Apps | Goals |
|---|---|---|---|---|---|---|---|---|---|---|
| PEC Zwolle | 2021–22 | Eredivisie | 1 | 0 | 1 | 0 | — | | 2 | 0 |
| PEC Zwolle | 2022–23 | Eerste Divisie | 13 | 1 | 2 | 0 | — | | 15 | 1 |
| PEC Zwolle | Total | | 14 | 1 | 3 | 0 | — | | 17 | 1 |
| Cambuur | 2023–24 | Eerste Divisie | 15 | 1 | 1 | 0 | — | | 16 | 1 |
| Cambuur | 2024–25 | Eerste Divisie | 2 | 0 | 0 | 0 | — | | 2 | 0 |
| Cambuur | Total | | 17 | 1 | 1 | 0 | — | | 18 | 1 |
| Telstar | 2026–27 | Eredivisie | 6 | 0 | 1 | 0 | — | | 7 | 0 |
| Career total | | | 37 | 2 | 5 | 0 | 0 | 0 | 42 | 2 |
