= Floris Smand =

Dutch footballer (born 2003)

Personal information
- Date of birth: 20 January 2003 (age 23)
- Place of birth: Utrecht, Netherlands
- Height: 1.87 m (6 ft 2 in)
- Position: Centre-back

Team information
- Current team: Eldense
- Number: 3

Youth career
- CVVO
- –2016: Flevo Boys
- 2016–2022: Cambuur

Senior career*
Years	Team	Apps	(Gls)
2022–2025	Cambuur	64	(1)
2024	→ Västerås SK (loan)	6	(0)
2025–	Eldense	37	(1)
- * Club domestic league appearances and goals as of 27 May 2026

Floris Smand (born 20 January 2003) is a Dutch professional footballer who plays as a centre-back for Spanish Primera Federación club Eldense.

== Career ==
Smand grew up in the town of Lemmer, in the province of Friesland. He started playing football for CVVO and Flevo Boys, before joining Cambuur's youth academy in 2016.

Smand signed his first professional contract with Cambuur in August 2022; a two-year deal with an option for an additional season. He made his professional debut in the Eredivisie appearing at Cambuur Stadion in a 2–0 defeat to Excelsior on 6 August 2022. He appeared as a starter in head coach Henk de Jong's lineup, and played 58 minutes before being substituted by Léon Bergsma.

In his debut season with Cambuur, he suffered relegation from the Eredivisie. The subsequent summer saw a renegotiation and extension of his contract, keeping him at the club until 2025, once more incorporating an option for an additional year. On 6 November 2023, he scored his first goal for Cambuur in a dominant 8–1 away victory against TOP Oss; the latter's most significant home defeat ever.

On 25 August 2024, Smand joined Swedish club Västerås SK on loan from Cambuur until the end of the calendar year, with an option to buy. The option was not exercised, and he returned to Cambuur for the second half of the 2024–25 season. He left the club at the end of the campaign following the expiry of his contract.

On 11 July 2025, Smand signed a two-year contract with Eldense in the Spanish third tier.

== Career statistics ==
As of match played 16 May 2025

Appearances and goals by club, season and competition
Club	Season	League			National Cup		Other		Total	
Club	Season	Division	Apps	Goals	Apps	Goals	Apps	Goals	Apps	Goals
Cambuur	2022–23	Eredivisie	23	0	1	0	—		24	0
Cambuur	2023–24	Eerste Divisie	32	1	3	0	—		35	1
Cambuur	2024–25	Eerste Divisie	9	0	0	0	2 (Note: Appearances in Eredivisie promotion/relegation playoffs)	0	11	0
Cambuur	Total		64	1	4	0	2	0	70	1
Västerås SK (loan)	2024	Allsvenskan	6	0	0	0	—		6	0
Career total			70	1	4	0	2	0	76	1
