= Remco Balk =

Dutch footballer (born 2001)

Personal information
- Date of birth: 2 March 2001 (age 25)
- Place of birth: Zuidhorn, Netherlands
- Height: 1.73 m (5 ft 8 in)
- Position: Winger

Team information
- Current team: Bali United
- Number: 11

Youth career
- –2012: VV Zuidhorn
- 2012–2020: Groningen

Senior career*
Years	Team	Apps	(Gls)
2020–2021	Groningen	11	(1)
2021	Jong Utrecht	18	(2)
2021–2023	Utrecht	19	(0)
2022–2023	→ Cambuur (loan)	30	(1)
2023–2026	Cambuur	107	(32)
2026–	Bali United	3	(0)
- * Club domestic league appearances and goals as of 20 September 2026

Remco Balk (born 2 March 2001) is a Dutch professional footballer who plays as a winger for Super League club Bali United.

== Career ==
=== Groningen ===
Balk was born in Zuidhorn, Province of Groningen where he started playing football for local side VV Zuidhorn before joining FC Groningen's academy in 2012. In 2018, he signed a professional contract with the club, keeping him part of Groningen until 2021.

On 25 September 2020, Balk made his professional debut in a 3–1 Eredivisie loss to Twente, replacing Ramon Pascal Lundqvist in the 66th minute. In the following league game on 4 October, Balk made his first start and scored his first professional goal, which proved to be decisive, as Groningen beat Ajax 1–0.

=== Utrecht ===
On 20 January 2021, Balk's transfer to division rivals Utrecht was announced, with him signing a deal until 2025. Upon signing, the club's technical director Jordy Zuidam stated: "Remco is a dynamic player with excellent technical skills ... He possesses a tremendous drive and a strong mentality. We are convinced that Remco is a great fit for FC Utrecht, and we're thrilled to welcome him here."

His debut for Utrecht followed on 24 January, coming on as a substitute for Bart Ramselaar in the 84th minute of a 1–0 victory against Sparta Rotterdam. Subsequently, Balk alternated between playing matches for both the first and second team of Utrecht, the latter in the second tier.

=== Cambuur ===
Balk was sent on a one-season loan to Eredivisie club Cambuur on 2 June 2022. The deal did not include an option to buy. After signing, Balk stated that he had signed with Cambuur because he wanted to play regularly and enjoy football again, as his opportunities at FC Utrecht had become limited. He made 30 league appearances that season, of which most were as a substitute, as Cambuur suffered relegation to the Eerste Divisie at the end of the season.

On 28 June 2023, Balk moved to Cambuur on a permanent deal and signed a two-year contract with an option for the third year. In his second season at the club, he established himself as a starter in manager Henk de Jong's lineup. Balk had disciplinary problems during the 2023–24 season, matching a negative division record with 13 yellow cards. Thereby, he tied the record of 13 yellow cards previously set by Sander Duits in the 2008–09 season and Philippe Liard in the 2010–11 season.

Balk left Cambuur at the end of the 2025–26 season, which culminated in promotion to the Eredivisie.

== Personal life ==
Growing up in Zuidhorn, Balk worked as dishwasher in his father's restaurant "Balk Restaurant en Zalencentrum".

== Career statistics ==
As of match played 13 April 2025

Appearances and goals by club, season and competition
Club	Season	League			KNVB Cup		Other		Total	
Club	Season	Division	Apps	Goals	Apps	Goals	Apps	Goals	Apps	Goals
Groningen	2020–21	Eredivisie	11	1	1	0	—		12	1
Utrecht	2020–21	Eredivisie	2	0	0	0	0	0	2	0
Utrecht	2021–22	Eredivisie	17	0	2	1	0	0	19	1
Utrecht	Total		19	0	2	1	0	0	21	1
Jong Utrecht	2020–21	Eerste Divisie	6	1	—		—		6	1
Jong Utrecht	2021–22	Eerste Divisie	12	1	—		—		12	1
Jong Utrecht	Total		18	2	—		—		18	2
Cambuur	2022–23	Eredivisie	30	1	2	1	—		32	2
Cambuur	2023–24	Eerste Divisie	33	8	5	1	—		38	9
Cambuur	2024–25	Eerste Divisie	33	16	2	0	—		35	16
Cambuur	Total		96	25	9	2	—		105	27
Career total			144	28	12	3	0	0	156	31
