= Yanick van Osch =

Dutch footballer (born 1997)

Personal information
- Full name: Yanick Marinus Paulus van Osch
- Date of birth: 24 March 1997 (age 29)
- Place of birth: 's-Hertogenbosch, Netherlands
- Height: 1.83 m (6 ft 0 in)
- Position: Goalkeeper

Team information
- Current team: Dordrecht

Youth career
- 2002–2005: BLC
- 2005–2015: PSV

Senior career*
Years	Team	Apps	(Gls)
2015–2020	Jong PSV	50	(0)
2016–2020	PSV	0	(0)
2020–2023	Fortuna Sittard	61	(0)
2023–2024	Cambuur	36	(0)
2024–2026	RKC Waalwijk	4	(0)
2026–	Dordrecht	2	(0)

International career
2013	Netherlands U16	3	(0)
2013–2014	Netherlands U17	11	(0)
2014	Netherlands U18	2	(0)
2014–2016	Netherlands U19	16	(0)
2016–2017	Netherlands U20	2	(0)
2017–2018	Netherlands U21	1	(0)
- * Club domestic league appearances and goals as of 3 October 2026

Yanick Marinus Paulus van Osch (born 24 March 1997) is a Dutch professional footballer who plays as a goalkeeper for Eerste Divisie club Dordrecht.

== Club career ==
=== PSV ===
Van Osch began his football career with BLC in 's-Hertogenbosch before joining the PSV youth academy for the 2005–06 season. Van Osch signed a professional contract in June 2013 that was initially set to expire in 2016. However, the contract was later extended until 2018 in March 2016, and then again until 2020 in November 2017. On 2 October 2015, he made his debut for the reserve team, Jong PSV, in the Eerste Divisie at home against Achilles '29. He was promoted to the professional squad of head coach Phillip Cocu in September 2017, but failed to make an appearance for the first team.

=== Fortuna Sittard ===
On 12 May 2020, Van Osch signed a two-year contract, with the option of a third year, with Fortuna Sittard effective as of 1 July, after becoming a free agent. He was initially signed as a backup to starting goalkeeper, Alexei Koșelev.

On 28 October 2020, he made his competitive debut for Fortuna in a 2–0 KNVB Cup victory against Roda JC. He made his first start in the Eredivisie three days later in a 5–2 loss to Ajax, and was a regular starter the remainder of the season, resulting in Koșelev being relegated to a backup role.

Van Osch remained a regular starter for Fortuna in the Eredivisie for the 2020–21 and 2021–22 seasons. However, he lost his starting position to Ivor Pandur at the beginning of the 2022–23 campaign and was subsequently relegated to a backup role. In March 2023, the club announced the formal termination of his contract in accordance with regulations, which meant that he was set to leave Fortuna at the end of the season.

=== Cambuur ===
On 9 June 2023, Van Osch signed a three-year contract with Eerste Divisie club Cambuur, reuniting with former Fortuna manager Sjors Ultee. He immediately established himself as a starter on the first matchday of the season, in a 2–2 draw against Emmen.

=== RKC Waalwijk ===
On 25 June 2024, Van Osch signed a two-year contract with an option for an additional year with Eredivisie club RKC Waalwijk. He was brought in as a replacement for the departing goalkeepers Etienne Vaessen and Mark Spenkelink.

=== Dordrecht ===
On 17 September 2026, Van Osch signed with Dordrecht until the end of the 2026–27 season as an emergency replacement for injured Calvin Raatsie and Thomas Artic.

== International career ==
Van Osch was a youth international for the Netherlands. He played three matches for the Netherlands under-16s, and eleven matches for the national U17 team, with whom he participated in the 2014 UEFA European Under-17 Championship, reaching the final. He also played for the under-18 team and was a regular starter for the Netherlands under-19 team, making 16 appearances for the team, with whom he reached the semi-finals of the 2016 UEFA European Under-19 Championship in Germany. After one match for the under-20 national team, he made his debut for the Jong Oranje (Netherlands U21) on 27 March 2017 in a four-nations tournament in Spain against Austria.

== Career statistics ==
As of match played 10 May 2024

Appearances and goals by club, season and competition
Club	Season	League			KNVB Cup		Other		Total	
Club	Season	Division	Apps	Goals	Apps	Goals	Apps	Goals	Apps	Goals
Jong PSV	2015–16	Eerste Divisie	5	0	—		—		5	0
Jong PSV	2016–17	Eerste Divisie	10	0	—		—		10	0
Jong PSV	2017–18	Eerste Divisie	17	0	—		—		17	0
Jong PSV	2018–19	Eerste Divisie	15	0	—		—		15	0
Jong PSV	2019–20	Eerste Divisie	3	0	—		—		3	0
Jong PSV	Total		50	0	—		—		50	0
Fortuna Sittard	2021–22	Eredivisie	26	0	1	0	—		27	0
Fortuna Sittard	2021–22	Eredivisie	32	0	2	0	—		34	0
Fortuna Sittard	2022–23	Eredivisie	3	0	1	0	—		4	0
Fortuna Sittard	Total		61	0	4	0	0	0	65	0
Cambuur	2023–24	Eerste Divisie	36	0	5	0	—		41	0
RKC Waalwijk	2024–25	Eredivisie	0	0	0	0	—		0	0
Career total			147	0	9	0	0	0	156	0

== Honours ==
Netherlands U17

- UEFA European U-17 Championship runner-up: 2014

Individual

- UEFA European Under-17 Championship Team of the Tournament: 2014
