= Jeremy van Mullem =

Dutch footballer (born 1999)

Personal information
- Date of birth: 18 March 1999 (age 27)
- Place of birth: Vlaardingen, Netherlands
- Height: 1.84 m (6 ft 0 in)
- Positions: Defensive midfielder; centre-back

Team information
- Current team: Omonia Aradippou
- Number: 14

Youth career
- –2011: VV Zwaluwen
- 2011–2019: Feyenoord

Senior career*
Years	Team	Apps	(Gls)
2019–2020	SSV Jeddeloh	21	(0)
2020–2022	Jong Sparta	23	(1)
2021–2023	Sparta Rotterdam	43	(0)
2023–2025	Cambuur	62	(3)
2025–	Omonia Aradippou	32	(0)
- * Club domestic league appearances and goals as of 14 June 2026

Jeremy van Mullem (born 18 March 1999) is a Dutch professional footballer who plays as a defensive midfielder for Cypriot club Omonia Aradippou.

== Career ==
=== Early years ===
Van Mullem began his youth career at VV Zwaluwen and later moved to Feyenoord's academy, where he signed his first professional contract in 2018.

After one season with Jong Feyenoord, his contract expired in 2019, and he left on a free transfer to SSV Jeddeloh in Germany, competing in Regionalliga Nord. He made his debut for Jeddeloh on 21 July 2019, in a 1–1 draw at home against VfB Oldenburg in the Lower Saxony Cup. As the match ended in a draw, a penalty shootout ensued, resulting in Jeddeloh's elimination. A week later, on 27 July, he played his first league match, a 3–1 loss to VfB Lübeck. Van Mullem would go on to make a total of 21 appearances in the Regionalliga Nord before the league was indefinitely suspended due to the COVID-19 pandemic.

=== Sparta Rotterdam ===
In 2020, Van Mullem joined Jong Sparta Rotterdam on an amateur contract, where he made his first appearance in the Tweede Divisie on 5 September 2020, against Jong Volendam. After six matches, the Tweede Divisie was cancelled due to COVID-19, and Van Mullem did not feature for Jong Sparta again.

Towards the end of the 2020–21 season, he was included in the first-team squad of Sparta Rotterdam for several matches. He made his debut for Sparta in the last game of the regular season, a 2–1 away victory against SC Heerenveen in the Eredivisie, coming on as a substitute for Wouter Burger in the 74th minute. In May 2022, Van Mullem extended his contract with Sparta for two more seasons.

=== Cambuur ===
On 1 September 2023, Van Mullem signed a two-year contract with an option for an additional season with recently relegated Eerste Divisie club Cambuur. He made his competitive debut for the club on 9 September, starting in a 3–1 league win over Den Bosch. On 6 November, he scored his first goal for Cambuur in a dominant 8–1 away victory against TOP Oss; the latter's most significant home defeat ever.

=== Omonia Aradippou ===
On 13 August 2025, Van Mullem signed a two-year contract with Cypriot First Division club Omonia Aradippou. In Van Mullem's first season, Omonia Aradippou avoided relegation, securing survival with a 2–1 win over Akritas Chlorakas on 9 May 2026. He made 34 total appearances in his first season at the club.

== Career statistics ==
As of match played 15 May 2026

Appearances and goals by club, season and competition
Club	Season	League			National cup (Note: Includes KNVB Cup, Cypriot Cup)		Other		Total	
Club	Season	Division	Apps	Goals	Apps	Goals	Apps	Goals	Apps	Goals
SSV Jeddeloh	2019–20	Regionalliga Nord	21	0	0	0	1 (Note: Appearance in Lower Saxony Cup)	0	22	0
Jong Sparta	2020–21	Tweede Divisie	6	0	—		—		6	0
Jong Sparta	2021–22	Tweede Divisie	17	1	—		—		17	1
Jong Sparta	Total		23	1	—		—		23	1
Sparta Rotterdam	2020–21	Eredivisie	1	0	0	0	—		1	0
Sparta Rotterdam	2021–22	Eredivisie	12	0	1	0	—		13	0
Sparta Rotterdam	2022–23	Eredivisie	27	0	2	0	0	0	29	0
Sparta Rotterdam	2023–24	Eredivisie	3	0	0	0	—		3	0
Sparta Rotterdam	Total		43	0	3	0	0	0	46	0
Cambuur	2023–24	Eerste Divisie	26	2	5	0	—		31	2
Cambuur	2024–25	Eerste Divisie	36	1	2	0	2 (Note: Appearances in Eredivisie promotion/relegation playoffs)	0	40	1
Cambuur	Total		62	3	7	0	2	0	71	3
Omonia Aradippou	2025–26	First Division	32	0	2	0	—		34	0
Career total			181	4	12	0	3	0	196	4
