= Youns El Hilali =

Italian footballer (born 2003)

Personal information
- Full name: Youns Gabriele El Hilali
- Date of birth: 8 June 2003 (age 23)
- Place of birth: Milan, Italy
- Height: 1.78 m (5 ft 10 in)
- Positions: Attacking midfielder; forward

Team information
- Current team: Caronnese

Youth career
- Alcione
- –2014: Accademia Inter
- 2014–2015: Novara
- 2015–2023: AC Milan

Senior career*
Years	Team	Apps	(Gls)
2023–2024	Cambuur	16	(2)
2024	→ Arzignano (loan)	7	(0)
2024-2025	Pompei	11	(2)
2025	Pavia	0	(0)
2025	Orvietana	3	(0)
2025–	Caronnese		

International career^{‡}
2019	Italy U16	2	(1)
- * Club domestic league appearances and goals as of 23 January 2026 ‡ National team caps and goals as of 18 April 2019

Youns Gabriele El Hilali (born 8 June 2003) is an Italian professional footballer who plays as an attacking midfielder or a forward for Eccellenza club Caronnese.

== Club career ==
Born in Milan, El Hilali started playing football at local clubs Alcione and Accademia Inter, before joining Novara in 2014, and then entering AC Milan's youth sector the following year.

Having come through the club's youth ranks, he began playing for the under-19 team from the 2021–22 season; in the following campaign, he was made vice-captain of the side, while also starting training with the first team, under manager Stefano Pioli. Having taken part in a training camp with the first team in Dubai during the league's winter break for the 2022 FIFA World Cup, the striker went on to help AC Milan's under-19 team reach the UEFA Youth League semi-finals for the first time in their history, as they eventually got eliminated by Hajduk Split.

On 12 July 2023, El Hilali joined Dutch side Cambuur on a permanent deal, signing a two-year contract with the club, with an option for another year. In the process, he became Cambuur's first ever Italian player. On 11 August of the same year, he made his professional debut for the club, coming on as a substitute for Alex Bangura in the 86th minute of a 2–2 league draw against Emmen. On 17 September, he scored his first professional goal, netting the winner in a 1–0 league victory over Willem II.

On 1 February 2024, El Hilali was sent out on loan to Serie C club Arzignano until the end of the season. On 9 July 2024, the contract with Cambuur was terminated by mutual consent.

== International career ==
El Hilali is eligible to represent either Italy or Morocco internationally.

He played for the Italian under-16 national team in 2019, and then received call-ups from the under-17 and under-18 national teams.

== Style of play ==
El Hilali is an attacking midfielder, who can also play as a winger on both sides, or as a centre-forward. He has been regarded for his technique and his dribbling skills.

== Personal life ==
El Hilali was born in Milan by a Moroccan father and an Italian mother.

He is the younger brother of fellow footballer Mattia El Hilali (b. 1998), who similarly played for AC Milan's youth teams and represented Italy at youth international level.
