= Sekou Sylla (footballer, born 1999) =

Guinean footballer (born 1999)

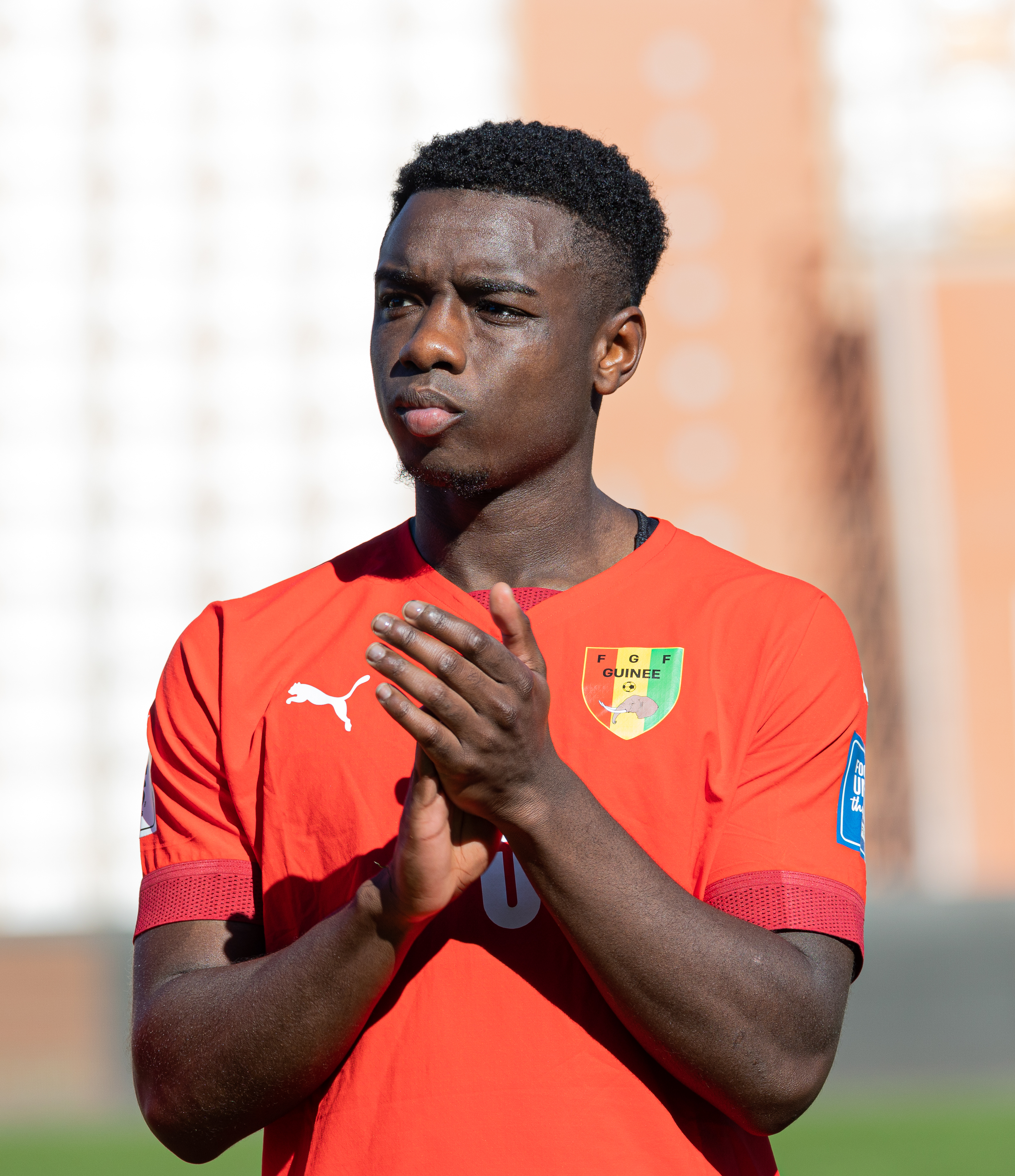

Personal information
- Full name: Sekou Oumar Sylla
- Date of birth: 9 January 1999 (age 27)
- Place of birth: Schiedam, Netherlands
- Height: 1.80 m (5 ft 11 in)
- Positions: Full-back; central midfielder; winger

Team information
- Current team: ADO Den Haag
- Number: 18

Senior career*
Years	Team	Apps	(Gls)
2018–2021	Excelsior Maassluis	62	(8)
2021–2022	TOP Oss	8	(0)
2022–2024	Cambuur	35	(1)
2024–	ADO Den Haag	75	(5)

International career^{‡}
2022–	Guinea	22	(0)
- * Club domestic league appearances and goals as of 24 October 2026 ‡ National team caps and goals as of 19:30, 1 October 2026 (UTC)

Sekou Oumar Sylla (born 9 January 1999) is a professional footballer who plays as a full-back, central midfielder or winger for Eredivisie club ADO Den Haag. Born in the Netherlands, he plays for the Guinea national team.

== Career ==
Born in Schiedam, Sylla started his career at Excelsior Maassluis before signing for Eerste Divisie side TOP Oss on an amateur contract in summer 2021.

He transferred on a free transfer to Eredivisie club SC Cambuur in January 2022, signing an 18-month contract. At the end of the 2023–24 season, Sylla left the club as his contract expired.

On 8 August 2024, Sylla signed a one-season contract with ADO Den Haag.

== International career ==
Born in the Netherlands, Sylla is of Guinean descent. He debuted with the Guinea national team in a friendly 0–0 tie with South Africa on 25 March 2022.

== Career statistics ==
=== Club ===
As of match played 27 October 2026

Appearances and goals by club, season and competition
Club	Season	League			Cup		Other		Total	
Club	Season	Division	Apps	Goals	Apps	Goals	Apps	Goals	Apps	Goals
Excelsior Maassluis	2017–18	Tweede Divisie	2	0	—		—		2	0
Excelsior Maassluis	2018–19	Tweede Divisie	31	4	2	1	—		33	5
Excelsior Maassluis	2019–20	Tweede Divisie	24	4	1	0	—		25	4
Excelsior Maassluis	2020–21	Tweede Divisie	5	0	1	0	—		6	0
Excelsior Maassluis	Total		62	8	4	1	—		66	9
TOP Oss	2021–22	Eerste Divisie	8	0	1	0	—		9	0
Cambuur	2021–22	Eredivisie	5	1	—		—		5	1
Cambuur	2022–23	Eredivisie	5	0	0	0	—		5	0
Cambuur	2023–24	Eerste Divisie	25	0	3	1	—		28	1
Cambuur	Total		35	1	3	1	—		38	2
ADO Den Haag	2024–25	Eerste Divisie	33	2	1	0	2 (Note: Appearances in promotion play-offs)	0	36	2
ADO Den Haag	2025–26	Eerste Divisie	32	2	1	0	—		33	2
ADO Den Haag	2026–27	Eredivisie	10	1	1	0	—		11	1
ADO Den Haag	Total		75	5	3	0	2	0	80	5
Career total			180	14	11	2	2	0	193	16

=== International ===
As of match played 1 October 2026

Appearances and goals by national team and year
National team	Year	Apps	Goals
Guinea	2022	2	0
Guinea	2023	4	0
Guinea	2024	8	0
Guinea	2025	5	0
Guinea	2026	3	0
Total		22	0

== Honours ==
ADO Den Haag

- Eerste Divisie: 2025–26
