= Léon Bergsma =

Dutch footballer (born 1997)

Personal information
- Date of birth: 25 January 1997 (age 29)
- Place of birth: Amsterdam, Netherlands
- Height: 1.86 m (6 ft 1 in)
- Position: Centre-back

Team information
- Current team: Neuchâtel Xamax
- Number: 21

Youth career
- Blauw-Wit
- –2005: RKSV Pancratius
- 2005–2015: Ajax

Senior career*
Years	Team	Apps	(Gls)
2015–2018	Jong Ajax	61	(1)
2018–2020	Jong AZ	34	(1)
2018–2020	AZ	2	(0)
2020	→ Den Bosch (loan)	4	(1)
2020–2022	Aarau	72	(5)
2022–2024	Cambuur	52	(0)
2024–2025	AC Oulu	20	(0)
2025–	Neuchâtel Xamax	23	(0)

International career
2012	Netherlands U15	3	(1)
2014	Netherlands U18	1	(0)
2016–2018	Netherlands U20	8	(0)
- * Club domestic league appearances and goals as of 28 September 2026

Léon Bergsma (born 25 January 1997) is a Dutch professional footballer who plays as a centre-back for Neuchâtel Xamax.

== Club career ==
=== Jong Ajax ===
Bergsma is a product of the youth system at Ajax, having joined the club at the age of eight after initially playing youth football for Blauw-Wit and RKSV Pancratius. On 8 May 2015, he made his professional debut for Jong Ajax in an Eerste Divisie match against TOP Oss, replacing Leeroy Owusu in the 88th minute. In April 2016, Bergsma signed his first contract with Ajax, which tied him to the club until 2018. Ahead of the 2016–17 season, Bergsma officially moved up from the under-19 team to the squad of Jong Ajax. He scored his first professional goal on 14 April 2017, heading home Noa Lang's corner-kick as Jong Ajax beat Dordrecht 1–0. With Bergsma as captain, Jong Ajax won the Eerste Divisie title in the 2017–18 season.

=== AZ ===
On 21 June 2018, Bergsma moved to AZ on a free transfer, and signed a four-year deal. He made his debut for the club on 12 August in a 5–0 victory against NAC Breda, replacing Ron Vlaar in the 81st minute. He made only three appearances for AZ's first team, as he primarily featured for their reserves, Jong AZ in the Eerste Divisie.

==== Loan to Den Bosch ====
Bergsma joined Eerste Divisie club Den Bosch on a six-month loan on 31 January 2020. He made only four appearances for the club, as the Royal Dutch Football Association (KNVB) decided to cancel the remainder of the season due to effects of the COVID-19 pandemic.

=== FC Aarau ===
In August 2020, Bergsma signed with Swiss club FC Aarau. The transfer came about in an unusual manner. During a chance meeting in Frankfurt, a stadium technician named Dany Bürge met the Dutch businessman Rob Been Jr., who had previously served as the director of Ajax. Several months later, Bürge visited Been in the Netherlands, where during a dinner conversation, he mentioned that FC Aarau was in need of a centre-back. Been, having an idea, immediately contacted Bergsma, who expressed interest. Bürge then facilitated a connection between Bergsma and FC Aarau's sports director, Sandro Burki. Following several trial training sessions, FC Aarau decided to sign Bergsma.

Bergsma made his competitive debut for the club, starting in a Swiss Cup second-round match against FC Wil on 12 September 2020, where Aarau advanced after penalty shoot-out. One week later, he made his debut in the Swiss Challenge League, also against FC Wil, as Aarau lost 3–1 at home. He remained a starter through two seasons with Aarau, scoring six goals in 78 total appearances.

=== Cambuur ===
On 28 July 2022, Bergsma returned to the Netherlands and signed a three-year contract with Eredivisie club Cambuur. He made his debut for the club on 6 August, the first matchday of the season, replacing Floris Smand in the second half of a 2–0 home loss to Excelsior. He soon established himself as a starter at centre-back, as Cambuur suffered relegation from the Eredivisie at the end of the season.

=== AC Oulu ===
On 27 August 2024, Bergsma signed with Finnish Veikkausliiga club AC Oulu on a contract running until June 2025, with an option to extend until the end of 2026. He made his debut on 1 September in a 2–1 league defeat to IFK Mariehamn.

He scored his first goal for the club on 7 May 2025 in a 5–1 victory over local rivals JS Hercules in the Finnish Cup.

=== Neuchâtel Xamax ===
On 23 July 2025, Bergsma returned to Switzerland after signing with Neuchâtel Xamax.

== Career statistics ==
As of match played 20 July 2025

Appearances and goals by club, season and competition
Club	Season	League			Cup (Note: Includes KNVB Cup, Swiss Cup, Finnish Cup)		Europe		Other		Total	
Club	Season	Division	Apps	Goals	Apps	Goals	Apps	Goals	Apps	Goals	Apps	Goals
Jong Ajax	2014–15	Eerste Divisie	1	0	—		—		—		1	0
Jong Ajax	2015–16	Eerste Divisie	0	0	—		—		—		0	0
Jong Ajax	2016–17	Eerste Divisie	27	1	—		—		—		27	1
Jong Ajax	2017–18	Eerste Divisie	33	0	—		—		—		33	0
Jong Ajax	Total		61	1	—		—		—		61	1
AZ	2018–19	Eredivisie	2	0	1	0	0	0	—		3	0
Jong AZ	2018–19	Eerste Divisie	24	1	—		—		—		24	1
Jong AZ	2019–20	Eerste Divisie	10	0	—		—		—		10	0
Jong AZ	Total		34	1	—		—		—		34	1
Den Bosch (loan)	2019–20	Eerste Divisie	4	0	—		—		—		4	0
FC Aarau	2020–21	Swiss Challenge League	35	3	4	1	—		—		39	4
FC Aarau	2021–22	Swiss Challenge League	35	2	2	0	—		—		37	2
FC Aarau	2022–23	Swiss Challenge League	2	0	0	0	—		—		2	0
FC Aarau	Total		72	5	6	1	—		—		78	6
Cambuur	2022–23	Eredivisie	24	0	0	0	—		—		24	0
Cambuur	2023–24	Eerste Divisie	28	0	4	0	—		—		32	0
Cambuur	Total		52	0	4	0	—		—		56	6
AC Oulu	2024	Veikkausliiga	6	0	—		—		—		6	0
AC Oulu	2025	Veikkausliiga	14	0	3	2	—		5 (Note: Appearances in Finnish League Cup)	0	22	2
AC Oulu	Total		20	0	3	2	0	0	5	0	28	2
Neuchâtel Xamax	2025–26	Swiss Challenge League	0	0	0	0	–		–		0	0
Career total			245	6	14	3	0	0	5	0	264	9

== Honours ==
Jong Ajax

- Eerste Divisie: 2017–18
