= Jhondly van der Meer =

Haitian footballer (born 2002)

Personal information
- Birth name: Jhondly Saint Juste
- Date of birth: 22 March 2002 (age 24)
- Place of birth: Santo Domingo, Dominican Republic
- Height: 1.83 m (6 ft 0 in)
- Position: Midfielder

Team information
- Current team: Jerv
- Number: 2

Youth career
- 2010–2013: csv de Leeuwarder Zwaluwen
- 2013–2020: Cambuur

Senior career*
Years	Team	Apps	(Gls)
2020–2024	Cambuur	30	(0)
2024–	Jerv	6	(0)

International career^{‡}
2021–2022	Haiti	3	(0)
- * Club domestic league appearances and goals as of 10 May 2024 ‡ National team caps and goals as of 8 December 2024

Jhondly van der Meer (né Saint Juste; born on 22 March 2002) is a professional footballer who plays as a midfielder for FK Jerv. Born in the Dominican Republic, he is capped for the Haiti national team.

== Early life ==
Van der Meer was born as Haitian in the neighbouring Dominican Republic since his biological parents were Haitian and they were not regularised there. He was raised in Haiti until he was 6, when he was adopted by a Dutch family, the Van der Meers, who took him to live with them in Leeuwarden, Netherlands. He is now a naturalised Dutch citizen.

== International career ==
Van der Meer was followed by the under-23 national coach for the Dominican Republic, where he was born, despite the fact that he is not a Dominican national. He was also on the Haiti national team radar. He made his international debut for Haiti in September 2021, playing two back-to-back friendlies against Bahrain and Jordan.
