= Nick de Groot =

Dutch professional footballer

Personal information
- Date of birth: 20 August 2001 (age 25)
- Place of birth: Zeeland, Netherlands
- Height: 1.73 m (5 ft 8 in)
- Position: Defender

Team information
- Current team: Fortuna Sittard
- Number: 15

Youth career
- 2009–2021: Den Bosch

Senior career*
Years	Team	Apps	(Gls)
2021–2026	Den Bosch	139	(10)
2026–	Fortuna Sittard	5	(0)
- * Club domestic league appearances and goals as of 10 September 2026

Nick de Groot (born 20 August 2001) is a Dutch professional footballer who plays as a defender for Eredivisie club Fortuna Sittard.

== Career ==
Born in Zeeland, North Brabant, de Groot began his career with FC Den Bosch at the age of 8, turning professional in February 2022, and scoring his first goal for the club in May 2023. In November 2023, he signed a new contract with the club, until 2027.

On 15 July 2026, de Groot moved to Fortuna Sittard in the Eredivisie on a multi-year contract.
