= Jasper ter Heide =

Dutch footballer (born 1999)

Personal information
- Date of birth: 29 March 1999 (age 27)
- Place of birth: Amsterdam, Netherlands
- Height: 1.73 m (5 ft 8 in)
- Position: Right-back

Team information
- Current team: ODIN '59

Youth career
- SVA Assendelft
- –2009: ADO '20
- 2009–2014: AZ
- 2014–2018: Ajax

Senior career*
Years	Team	Apps	(Gls)
2017–2020	Jong Ajax	31	(2)
2020−2023	Cambuur	43	(1)
2023	La Nucía	11	(0)
2025-	ODIN '59		

International career
2014	Netherlands U16	1	(0)
2017	Netherlands U19	2	(0)
- * Club domestic league appearances and goals as of 21:53, 3 July 2024 (UTC)

Jasper ter Heide (born 29 March 1999) is a Dutch professional footballer. He plays as a right-back for ODIN '59.

== Club career ==
Ter Heide, from Assendelft, made his Eerste Divisie debut for Jong Ajax on 17 August 2018 in a game against Roda JC Kerkrade as a 63rd-minute substitute for Dani de Wit.

On 31 January 2023, Ter Heide's contract with Cambuur was terminated by mutual consent. On 15 March 2023, Ter Heide signed with Spanish side La Nucía. He returned to the Netherlands and joined amateur side ODIN '59 in 2025.
