= Milan de Koe =

Dutch association footballer (born 2002)

Personal information
- Date of birth: 3 April 2002 (age 24)
- Place of birth: Groningen, Netherlands
- Height: 1.92 m (6 ft 4 in)
- Position: Centre-back

Team information
- Current team: Staphorst
- Number: 6

Youth career
- Cambuur
- 2016–2020: Groningen

Senior career*
Years	Team	Apps	(Gls)
2020–2021	Groningen II	5	(0)
2021–2022	VV Zuidhorn		
2022–2023	Harkemase Boys	34	(6)
2023–2024	Cambuur	5	(0)
2024–	Staphorst		
- * Club domestic league appearances and goals as of 16:55, 8 November 2024 (UTC)

Milan de Koe (born 3 April 2002) is a Dutch footballer who plays as a centre-back for Staphorst.

== Career ==
Born in Groningen, and raised in Zuidhorn, de Koe spent his early career with Cambuur and FC Groningen before initially deciding to retire from football in September 2021. He returned in amateur football, playing with VV Zuidhorn and Harkemase Boys, before turning professional with Cambuur in July 2023, where he made his professional debut. He was released by Cambuur in March 2024.

On 26 April 2024, recently relegated Vierde Divisie club Staphorst announced the signing of De Koe ahead of the 2024–25 season.
