= Milan Smit =

Dutch footballer (born 2003)

Personal information
- Full name: Milan Smit
- Date of birth: 13 February 2003 (age 23)
- Place of birth: Hollandscheveld, Netherlands
- Height: 1.91 m (6 ft 3 in)
- Position: Forward

Team information
- Current team: SV Darmstadt 98 (on loan from Stoke City)
- Number: 36

Youth career
- –2010: SV HODO
- 2010–2011: Emmen
- 2011–2017: Heerenveen
- 2017–2020: Twente
- 2020–2021: Cambuur

Senior career*
Years	Team	Apps	(Gls)
2022–2024	Cambuur	56	(22)
2024–2026	Go Ahead Eagles	41	(9)
2026	→ Stoke City (loan)	13	(2)
2026–	Stoke City	0	(0)
2026–	→ Darmstadt 98 (loan)	1	(0)
- * Club domestic league appearances and goals as of 21:28, 16 August 2026 (UTC)

Milan Smit (born 13 February 2003) is a Dutch professional footballer who plays as a forward for 2. Bundesliga club Darmstadt 98, on loan from EFL Championship club Stoke City

== Career ==
=== Early career ===
Smit was born in Hollandscheveld, Drenthe, and played youth football with local club SV HODO. At the age of seven he moved to Emmen for six months before joining Heerenveen. After six seasons in Friesland, he moved to the Twente youth academy, where he also played for three more years before joining SC Cambuur in 2020.

=== Cambuur ===
Smit made his professional debut in the Eredivisie for Cambuur on 3 April 2022 in a 2–1 defeat against NEC Nijmegen. Smit scored his first professional goal when he scored a 95th-minute equaliser against RKC Waalwijk on 6 May 2022, becoming Cambuur's youngest Eredivisie goalscorer. Smit voiced to the media that such a goal was a prime motivator for him over the summer of 2022 to prove that he was more than a "one-goal wonder". He played a further 15 times in 2022–23 as Cambuur suffered relegation to the Eerste Divisie. He signed a new contract with Cambuur in August 2023. Smit would go on to be the top scorer for the club during the 2023–24 season, with nineteen league goals, 24 in all competitions. In August 2024, a fee was reportedly agreed of around €900,000, excluding add-ons, for his transfer to Eredivisie club Go Ahead Eagles.

=== Go Ahead Eagles ===
On 26 August 2024, Smit signed a four-season contract with Go Ahead Eagles. Upon his signing the club's technical manager Paul Bosvelt noted that he was already in his fourth season in professional football, despite being only the age of 21 years-old, describing him as "a talented attacker with scoring ability who can hopefully develop further with us.” He made his debut for the club on 15 September 2024 in the Eredivisie in a 2–1 away win against Sparta Rotterdam. He scored his first goal for the club on 18 January 2025, scoring a 95th minute winning goal in a 2–1 home victory against FC Groningen. He scored in the penalty shootout in the final of the 2025 KNVB Cup final as Go Ahead Eagles won the trophy for the first time in their history, winning on penalties against AZ Alkmaar on 21 April 2025. Winning the cup earned Go Ahead a place in the UEFA Europa League and Smit scored twice against Panathinaikos in a 2–1 victory on 2 October 2025.

=== Stoke City ===
On 25 January 2026, Smit joined EFL Championship club Stoke City on loan until the end of the 2025–26 campaign, with a conditional obligation to buy in the summer. Smit scored his first goals in English football on 10 March 2026 in a 3–3 draw against Ipswich Town with his 2nd a 96th-minute penalty. On 14 May 2026, Stoke confirmed they had signed Smit on a permanent basis. However, manager Mark Robins stated that he could not give Smit the game time he needed to adjust to English football and on 14 August 2026, Smit joined German 2. Bundesliga side Darmstadt 98 on loan for the 2026–27 season.

== Career statistics ==
As of match played 23 August 2026

Appearances and goals by club, season and competition
Club	Season	League			National cup (Note: Includes DFB Pokal, FA Cup, KNVB Cup)		League cup (Note: Includes EFL Cup)		Europe		Other		Total	
Club	Season	Division	Apps	Goals	Apps	Goals	Apps	Goals	Apps	Goals	Apps	Goals	Apps	Goals
Cambuur	2021–22	Eredivisie	4	1	0	0	—		—		—		4	1
Cambuur	2022–23	Eredivisie	13	1	2	1	—		—		—		15	2
Cambuur	2023–24	Eerste Divisie	36	19	5	5	—		—		—		41	24
Cambuur	2024–25	Eerste Divisie	3	1	0	0	—		—		—		3	1
Cambuur	Total		56	22	7	6	—		—		—		63	28
Go Ahead Eagles	2024–25	Eredivisie	22	3	4	0	—		—		—		26	3
Go Ahead Eagles	2025–26	Eredivisie	19	6	2	1	—		6 (Note: Appearances in UEFA Europa League)	3	1 (Note: Appearance in Johan Cruyff Shield)	0	28	10
Go Ahead Eagles	Total		41	9	6	1	—		6	3	1	0	55	13
Stoke City (loan)	2025–26	Championship	13	2	1	0	0	0	—		—		14	2
Stoke City	2026–27	Championship	0	0	0	0	0	0	—		—		0	0
Stoke City	Total		13	2	1	0	0	0	—		—		14	2
Darmstadt 98 (loan)	2026-27	2. Bundesliga	1	0	1	1	—		—		—		2	1
Career total			111	33	15	8	0	0	6	3	1	0	133	44

== Honours ==
Go Ahead Eagles

- KNVB Cup: 2024–25
