= Silvester van der Water =

Dutch footballer (born 1996)

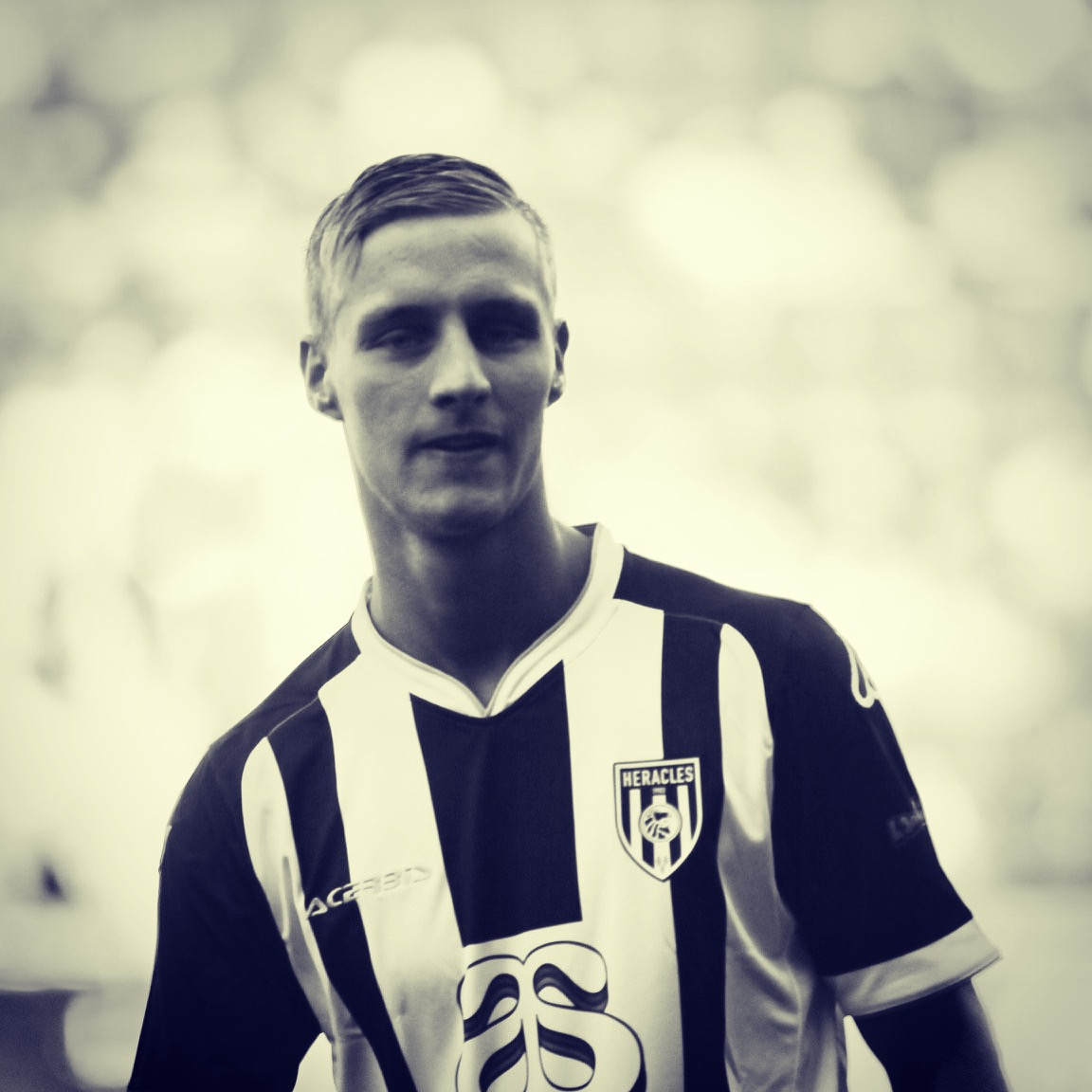

Personal information
- Date of birth: 30 September 1996 (age 30)
- Place of birth: Blaricum, Netherlands
- Height: 1.84 m (6 ft 0 in)
- Position: Winger

Team information
- Current team: Preah Khan Reach Svay Rieng FC
- Number: 96

Youth career
- 2003–2014: SDO Bussum
- 2014–2015: Almere City

Senior career*
Years	Team	Apps	(Gls)
2015–2018	Jong Almere City	51	(27)
2016–2018	Almere City	56	(18)
2018–2020	Jong Heracles	16	(12)
2018–2021	Heracles Almelo	53	(10)
2021–2022	Orlando City	32	(3)
2022–2024	Cambuur	36	(4)
2024	→ PEC Zwolle (loan)	12	(1)
2024–2025	RKC Waalwijk	17	(3)
2025–2026	Panionios	14	(2)
2026–	Preah Khan Reach Svay Rieng FC	1	(1)
- * Club domestic league appearances and goals as of 7 September 2026

Silvester van der Water (born 30 September 1996) is a Dutch professional footballer who plays as a winger for the Cambodian Premier League club, Preah Khan Reach Svay Rieng FC

== Club career ==
=== Almere City ===
In 2014, van der Water joined the Almere City academy from amateur side SDO Bussum where he had spent 11 years. Ahead of the 2015–16 season, van der Water was moved up to the club's under-21 team contesting the Beloften Eredivisie. That same season he was promoted to the senior team, making his senior debut on 12 February 2016 as an 82nd-minute substitute for Travis Brent in a 2–1 Eerste Divisie defeat to FC Eindhoven. He scored his first senior goals for the club on his third appearance, netting a brace in a 7–0 win over Jong PSV. He began the following season a regular starter but as Almere City's form declined, van der Water was dropped to the bench, earning most of his playing time as either a substitute or with the under-21s.

After eight goals in nine games in the Derde Divisie with Jong Almere City to start the 2017–18 season, van der Water earned a recall to the first-team. He scored 12 goals in 26 regular season appearances before proving instrumental in the 2017–18 promotion playoffs with three goals and three assists in six games as Almere City reached the final but missed out on the club's first promotion to the Eredivisie, losing to De Graafschap 3–2 over two legs.

=== Heracles Almelo ===
On 31 May 2018, van der Water agreed a three-year (with one optional year) contract with Eredivisie club Heracles Almelo. On 18 August 2018 he made his first division debut as an 81st-minute substitute as part of a 4–2 win over ADO Den Haag. He registered one assist in his first season with the club, failing to score a senior goal although he scored 12 goals in 14 appearances with Jong Heracles in the Reservecompetitie. He eventually scored his first senior goal for Heracles on matchday two of the 2019–20 season as part of a 1–1 draw with Fortuna Sittard.

After scoring and assisting in the 2020–21 season opening 2–0 victory over ADO Den Haag, van der Water pulled out of the squad for the week two 4–0 defeat to Willem II on 20 September 2020 following reported transfer interest from MLS team Orlando City. He met with manager Frank Wormuth the following day for discussions and was fined for his absence before being sent home to train away from the team with the club addressing the issue in an official statement. He returned to the squad the following week for the 1–1 draw with PSV Eindhoven. Transfer speculation returned in the winter window and on 19 February 2021, Wormuth confirmed van der Water had been given permission to leave the squad to complete a transfer. With three goals and four assists in the first half of the season, van der Water was second only to Rai Vloet in goal involvements on the team at the time of his transfer.

=== Orlando City ===
On 23 February 2021, Orlando City confirmed the signing of van der Water on a three-year contract plus a club option on a TAM deal. He made his club debut on 17 April as substitute for Alexandre Pato in the 80th minute of a season-opening goalless draw with Atlanta United. Van der Water made his first start in place of the suspended Nani on 22 May 2021. He provided the assist for Tesho Akindele on the only goal of the game and was named player of the match as Orlando beat Toronto FC 1–0 to maintain their unbeaten start to the season. He scored his first goal for the club on 29 May 2021 as a substitute in a 2–1 defeat away to New York Red Bulls.

=== Cambuur ===
On 1 July 2022, Van der Water signed a three-year contract with an option for an additional year with Cambuur.

On 1 February 2024, van der Water was loaned by PEC Zwolle.

=== RKC Waalwijk ===
On 2 September 2024, van der Water moved to RKC Waalwijk until the end of the season.

=== Panionios ===
On 12 July 2025, he joined Super League Greece 2 club Panionios.

=== Preah Khan Reach Svay Rieng ===
In July 2026 prior to the 2026 - 2027 Season, Silvester Van Der Water signed with Cambodian Premier League club, Preah Khan Reach Svay Rieng as an athlete reserved for the AFC Champions League 2, and the AFF Club Championship Shopee Cup. Currently, he is also registered as a Cambodian Premier League athlete according to the CPL website

== Career statistics ==
=== Club ===
As of 6 November 2025

Club	Season	Division	League		Cup (Note: Includes KNVB Cup.)		Continental		Playoffs		Total	
Club	Season	Division	Apps	Goals	Apps	Goals	Apps	Goals	Apps	Apps	Apps	Goals
Jong Almere City	2015–16	Beloften Eredivisie	16	10	—		—		—		16	10
Jong Almere City	2016–17	Derde Divisie	26	9	—		—		—		26	9
Jong Almere City	2017–18	Derde Divisie	9	8	—		—		—		9	8
Jong Almere City	Total		51	27	0	0	0	0	0	0	51	27
Almere City	2015–16	Eerste Divisie	3	2	0	0	—		1 (Note: 2015–16 Eredivisie promotion/relegation playoffs.)	0	4	2
Almere City	2016–17	Eerste Divisie	27	4	1	0	—		0	0	28	4
Almere City	2017–18	Eerste Divisie	26	12	1	0	—		6 (Note: 2017–18 Eredivisie promotion/relegation playoffs.)	3	33	15
Almere City	Total		56	18	2	0	0	0	7	3	65	21
Jong Heracles	2018–19	Reservecompetitie	14	12	—		—		—		14	12
Jong Heracles	2019–20	Reservecompetitie	2	0	—		—		—		2	0
Jong Heracles	Total		16	12	0	0	0	0	0	0	16	12
Heracles Almelo	2018–19	Eredivisie	12	0	0	0	—		1 (Note: 2018–19 Eredivisie Europa League playoffs.)	0	13	0
Heracles Almelo	2019–20	Eredivisie	23	7	3	3	—		—		26	10
Heracles Almelo	2020–21	Eredivisie	18	3	2	0	—		—		20	3
Heracles Almelo	Total		53	10	5	0	0	3	1	0	59	13
Orlando City	2021	MLS	27	3	—		1 (Note: Leagues Cup)	0	1	0	29	3
Orlando City	2022	MLS	4	0	1	0	—		—		5	0
Orlando City	Total		32	3	1	0	1	0	1	0	34	3
Cambuur	2022–23	Eredivisie	23	1	1	1	—		—		24	2
Cambuur	2023–24	Eerste Divisie	9	3	0	0	—		—		9	3
Cambuur	2024–25	Eerste Divisie	4	0	0	0	—		—		4	0
Cambuur	Total		36	4	1	1	—		—		37	5
PEC Zwolle (loan)	2023–24	Eredivisie	12	1	0	0	—		—		12	1
RKC Waalwijk	2024–25	Eredivisie	17	3	3	1	—		—		20	4
Panionios	2025–26	Super League Greece 2	7	1	1	1	—		—		8	2
Career total			280	79	13	6	1	0	9	3	302	88
