= Marco Tol =

Dutch footballer (born 1998)

Personal information
- Date of birth: 25 April 1998 (age 28)
- Place of birth: Purmerend, Netherlands
- Height: 1.88 m (6 ft 2 in)
- Position: Centre-back

Team information
- Current team: Roda JC Kerkrade
- Number: 3

Youth career
- RKAV Volendam
- –2017: FC Volendam

Senior career*
Years	Team	Apps	(Gls)
2016–2021	Jong Volendam	22	(2)
2017–2021	Volendam	100	(4)
2021–2024	Cambuur	88	(6)
2024–2025	Vizela	9	(0)
2025–	Roda JC Kerkrade	36	(0)

International career
2015	Netherlands U17	1	(0)
2015	Netherlands U18	2	(0)
- * Club domestic league appearances and goals as of 25 April 2026

Marco Tol (born 25 April 1998) is a Dutch professional footballer who plays as a centre-back for Eerste Divisie club Roda JC Kerkrade.

== Club career ==
=== Volendam ===
Tol was born on 25 April 1998 in Purmerend, North Holland. He started playing football for RKAV Volendam, before joining FC Volendam's academy. On 30 March 2015, he signed his first professional contract: a two-year deal with an option to renew by an additional season. The option was triggered by the club at the end of the 2016–17 season.

On 29 September 2017, Tol made his Eerste Divisie debut for Volendam in a game against Dordrecht, as an 82nd-minute substitute for Nick Runderkamp.

Tol became a regular starter at centre-back for Volendam during the 2018–19 season, and would go on to make more than 100 competitive appearances for the club.

=== Cambuur ===
In May 2021, Tol signed a three-year contract with Cambuur, who had recently been promoted to the Eredivisie. He was mainly a substitute during his first season, but established himself in his second season at the club, where Cambuur suffered relegation to the Eerste Divisie. Tol missed only one game during the 2023–24 season, as Cambuur reached the semi-finals of the KNVB Cup. At the end of the season, Tol left the club as his contract expired.

=== Roda ===
On 6 June 2025, Tol returned to the Netherlands and joined Roda JC Kerkrade on a two-season deal.
