= Rob Dieperink =

Dutch football referee (1988–2026)

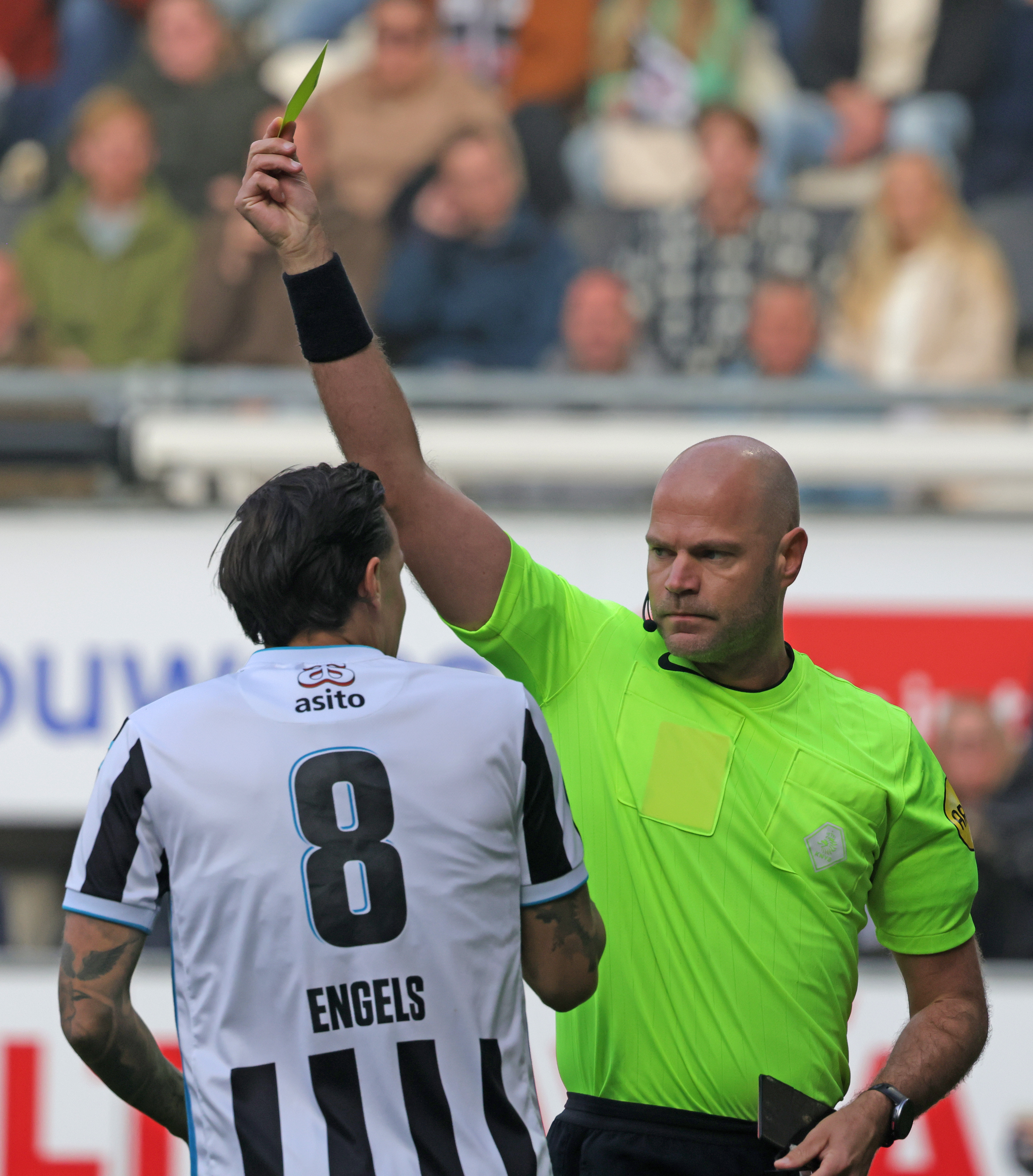
- Dieperink in 2025
- Born: 18 April 1988; Borculo, Netherlands
- Died: 13 July 2026 (aged 38); Borculo, Netherlands

Domestic
Years	League	Role
2012–2017	Eerste Divisie	Referee
2017–2026	Eredivisie	Referee

International
Years	League	Role
2024–2026	FIFA listed	Referee

Rob Dieperink (18 April 1988 – 13 July 2026) was a Dutch football referee. He was employed by the KNVB and officiated matches in the Eerste Divisie and Eredivisie.

== Biography ==
Dieperink made his Eerste Divisie debut in the 2011–12 season, in the match between Telstar and Go Ahead Eagles, where he issued four yellow cards. He made his top-flight debut on 4 November 2017, in the match between Excelsior and Roda JC on matchday eleven of the Eredivisie.

In April 2024, Dieperink was selected as video assistant referee (VAR) for the UEFA Euro 2024 in Germany. He was also appointed to officiating pool for the 2024 Summer Olympics in Paris.

On 9 April 2026, after having acted as VAR in the Conference League match between Crystal Palace and Fiorentina, Dieperink was arrested by the English police in the hotel where he was staying, on suspicion of the sexual assault of a teenage boy. The police analysed CCTV and electronic devices, and decided that there was insufficient evidence to charge him, and no further action was taken. Because of this episode, he was excluded from the list of referees called up for the 2026 FIFA World Cup, where he was supposed to be part of the Dutch team led by referee Danny Makkelie as VAR.

Dieperink refereed his last match on 11 July 2026, a friendly match between Go Ahead Eagles and Apollon Limassol (0–3). Two days later, on 13 July 2026, he was found dead in his home, at the age of 38.
