= Cambuur Stadion =

Football stadium in Leeuwarden, Netherlands

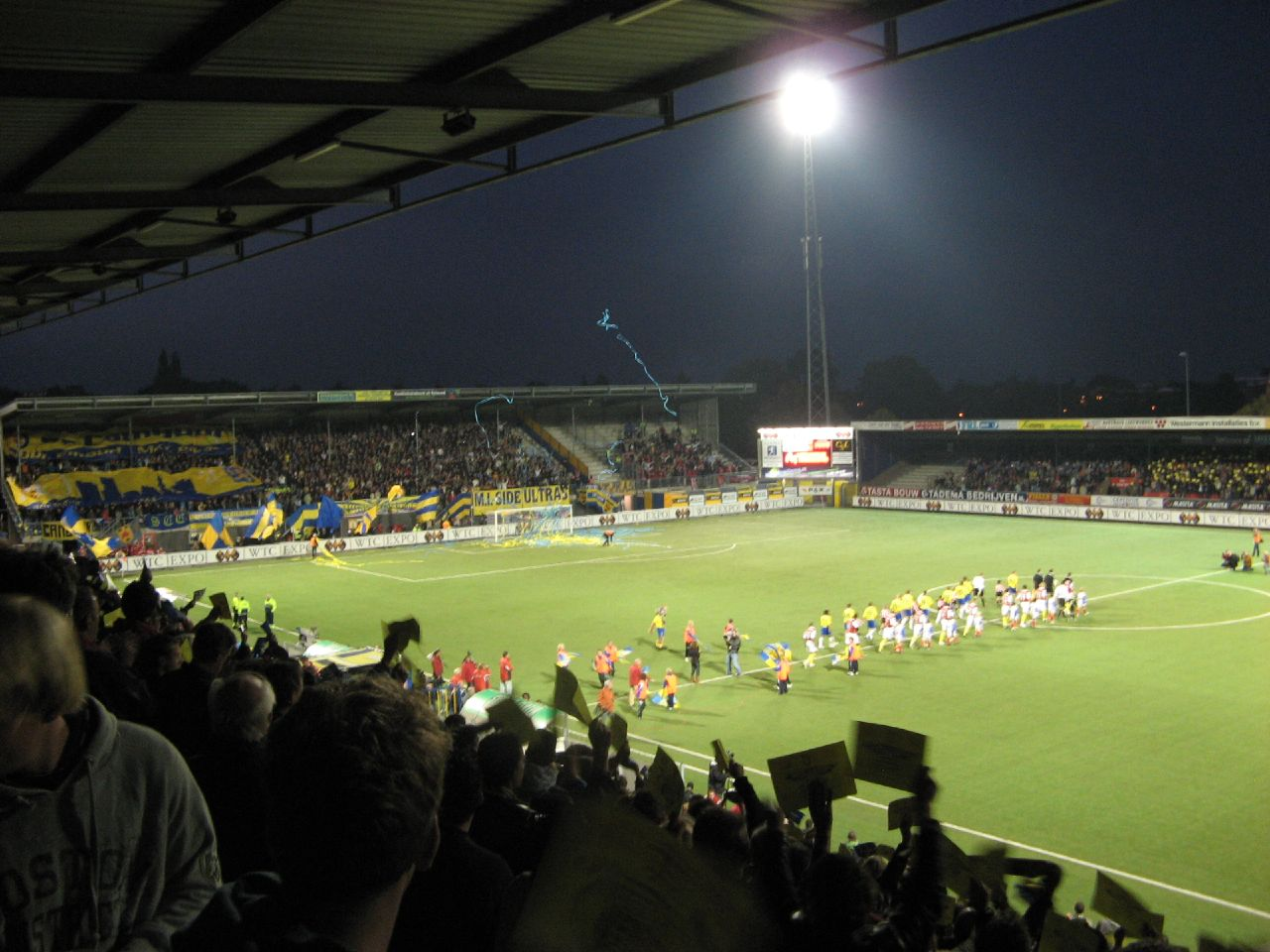
- Interactive map of Cambuur Stadion
- Location: Cambuurplein 44, Leeuwarden, Netherlands
- Coordinates: 53°12′19″N 5°48′53″E
- Capacity: 10,250
- Surface: artificial turf

Construction
- Opened: September 12, 1936
- Closed: 2024
- Demolished: 2025

Tenant
- SC Cambuur (1936–2024)

The Cambuur Stadion (Dutch pronunciation: [ˈkɑmbyːr ˌstaːdijɔn]) was a football stadium in the east side of the city of Leeuwarden, Netherlands. It was used for the home matches of SC Cambuur. The stadium is able to hold 10,500 people and it opened on 12 September 1936. Since 2024, the club started to play their home matches in the Kooi Stadion. The stadion was demolished in late 2025.

== See also ==
- List of football stadiums in the Netherlands
- Lists of stadiums
