= Alex Bangura =

Sierra Leonean footballer (born 1999)

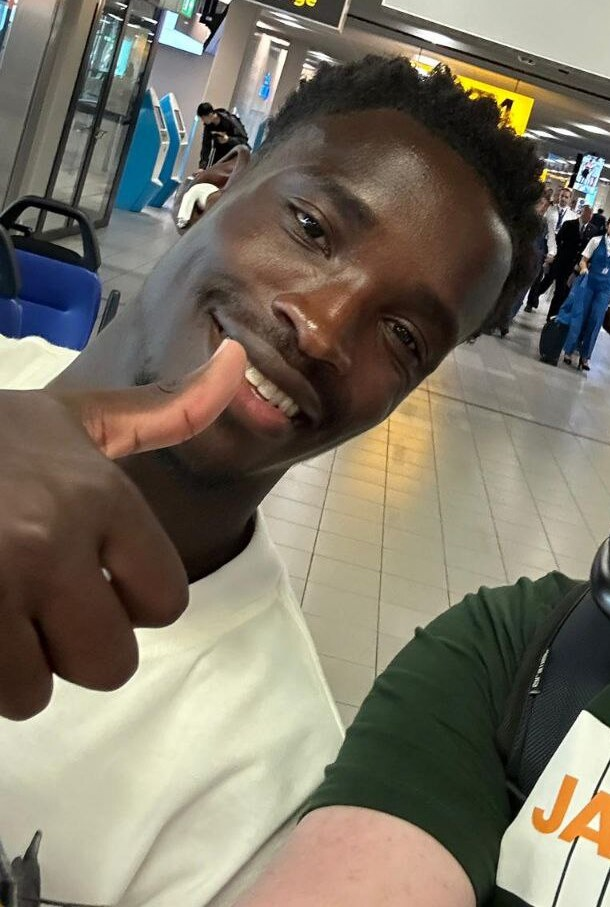
- Bangura, 2023

Personal information
- Full name: Alex Bangura
- Date of birth: 13 July 1999 (age 27)
- Place of birth: Mokomre, Sierra Leone
- Height: 1.83 m (6 ft 0 in)
- Positions: Wing-back; winger

Team information
- Current team: Middlesbrough
- Number: 24

Youth career
- 2011-2015: DRL
- 2015–2018: Feyenoord

Senior career*
| Years | Team | Apps | (Gls) |
| 2018–2019 | Jong Cambuur | 7 | (1) |
| 2018–2023 | Cambuur | 106 | (5) |
| 2023– | Middlesbrough | 27 | (3) |

International career^{‡}
| 2022– | Sierra Leone | 4 | (0) |
- * Club domestic league appearances and goals as of 16:25, 25 April 2026 (UTC) ‡ National team caps and goals as of 11:07, 9 February 2023 (UTC)

Alex Bangura (born 13 July 1999) is a Sierra Leonean professional footballer who plays as a left-back or a winger for EFL Championship club Middlesbrough and the Sierra Leone national team.

== Club career ==
=== Cambuur ===
Bangura made his debut for Cambuur on 4 February 2019 away to Jong AZ. He went on to captain the side.

=== Middlesbrough ===
On 1 September 2023, Middlesbrough announced the signing of Bangura on a four-year contract for £1 million. He scored his first goal for the club on 28 November 2023 in a 4–0 win against Preston North End. Bangura was out for the whole 2024/25 season with injury.

== International career ==
Born in Sierra Leone, he also holds Dutch citizenship. He debuted for the Sierra Leone national team in a friendly 3–0 loss to Togo on 24 March 2022.

== Career statistics ==
As of match played 2 December 2023

Appearances and goals by club, season and competition
| Club | Season | League | | | National cup (Note: Includes KNVB Cup) | | League cup (Note: Includes EFL Cup) | | Other | | Total | |
| Club | Season | Division | Apps | Goals | Apps | Goals | Apps | Goals | Apps | Goals | Apps | Goals |
|---|---|---|---|---|---|---|---|---|---|---|---|---|
| Cambuur | 2018–19 | Eerste Divisie | 13 | 0 | 1 | 0 | — | | — | | 14 | 0 |
| Cambuur | 2019–20 | Eerste Divisie | 10 | 1 | 1 | 0 | — | | — | | 20 | 0 |
| Cambuur | 2020–21 | Eerste Divisie | 24 | 0 | 2 | 0 | — | | — | | 26 | 0 |
| Cambuur | 2021–22 | Eredivisie | 27 | 3 | 1 | 0 | — | | — | | 28 | 3 |
| Cambuur | 2022–23 | Eredivisie | 29 | 1 | 2 | 0 | — | | — | | 31 | 1 |
| Cambuur | 2023–24 | Eerste Divisie | 3 | 0 | 0 | 0 | — | | — | | 3 | 0 |
| Cambuur | Total | | 106 | 5 | 7 | 0 | — | | — | | 113 | 5 |
| Middlesbrough | 2023–24 | EFL Championship | 7 | 1 | 0 | 0 | 1 | 0 | — | | 8 | 1 |
| Career total | | | 113 | 6 | 7 | 0 | 1 | 0 | 0 | 0 | 123 | 6 |
