= Sjors Ultee =

Dutch football manager (born 1987)

Personal information
- Date of birth: 23 May 1987 (age 39)
- Place of birth: Utrecht, Netherlands

Team information
- Current team: TOP Oss (head coach)

Senior career*
Years	Team	Apps	(Gls)
- DVSU

Managerial career
- 2019–2020: Fortuna Sittard
- 2020–2022: Fortuna Sittard
- 2022–2023: SC Cambuur
- 2024–: TOP Oss
- * Club domestic league appearances and goals

Sjors Ultee (born 23 May 1987) is a Dutch professional football manager and former player who is the head coach of Eerste Divisie club TOP Oss.

== Managerial career ==
Ultee was briefly an amateur footballer, but at a young age was planning on becoming a sports doctor or teacher. In 2006 he started working with FC Utrecht as assistant technique trainer. In 2009, he became a part-time trainer at the club, and in 2014 became an assistant manager under Rob Alflen. After stints as assistant manager with FC Twente and Helmond, Ultee was appointed the manager of Fortuna Sittard in the Eredivisie on 13 June 2019.

On 22 April 2024, Ultee was appointed head coach of Eerste Divisie club TOP Oss ahead of the 2024–25 season.
