= Henk de Jong =

Dutch football manager (born 1964)

Personal information
- Date of birth: 27 August 1964 (age 62)
- Place of birth: Drachten, Netherlands

Team information
- Current team: Cambuur (assistant coach)

Youth career
- Drachtster Boys

Senior career*
| Years | Team | Apps | (Gls) |
| 1984–1985 | Heerenveen | 0 | (0) |

Managerial career
- 1994–1997: Drachtster Boys
- 1997–1999: Sneek
- 2002–2005: Sneek
- 2007–2010: Harkemase Boys
- 2013: Cambuur (caretaker)
- 2014–2016: Cambuur
- 2017–2019: De Graafschap
- 2019–2022: Cambuur
- 2023–2026: Cambuur
- 2023–: Cambuur (assistant)
- * Club domestic league appearances and goals

Henk de Jong (born 27 August 1964) is a Dutch professional football manager who is the assistant coach of Cambuur, a club where he worked as a head coach for many seasons. He is regarded by the club as the most successful manager in their history, having guided the club to three promotions to the Eredivisie and won the Eerste Divisie title twice as head coach, in 2012–13 and 2020–21. He also won the Rinus Michels Award twice, for Manager of the Year in amateur football in 2008–09 and in professional football in 2021.

== Early life and career ==
De Jong studied at the Central Institute for Sports Education (CIOS) in Heerenveen, where his instructors included Foppe de Haan, and his peers included Wiljan Vloet, Gertjan Verbeek, and Jan de Jonge. He played for Drachtster Boys until age 19 before joining SC Heerenveen's first team, but a knee injury ended his playing career prematurely.

== Managerial career ==
De Jong's coaching career began at Drachtster Boys, where he coached the youth teams for seven years before taking charge of the first team in the Hoofdklasse for three years. In 1997, he moved to Sunday Hoofdklasse club Sneek. Two years later, in 1999, he joined Heracles Almelo as an assistant coach under Fritz Korbach. After one season, De Jong left the club and spent two years as an assistant coach at Heerenveen, where he helped the youth teams win national titles. He then moved to Groningen, where he served as coach of the reserves and as assistant to the first team under Ron Jans before returning to the amateur level to coach Harkemase Boys. His time at Harkemase Boys was marked by success, as he led the team to championships in the Eerste Klasse and Hoofdklasse, and in his final season, he achieved promotion to the Topklasse as runners-up. In May 2009, he won the named Rinus Michels Award for Manager of the Year in Amateur Football.

In early 2011, De Jong joined Cambuur as an assistant coach. At the end of the 2012–13 season, he became interim head coach and guided the club to the Eerste Divisie title. Despite his success, De Jong narrowly missed passing a professional football coaching course by one point, preventing him from coaching in the Eredivisie. Instead, he worked as the assistant to Dwight Lodeweges. De Jong was then appointed manager of Cambuur in April 2014, succeeding Lodeweges who had left the club after it was announced he would become the manager of the biggest rival of Cambuur, Heerenveen.

He returned to Cambuur in July 2019 after two years in charge of De Graafschap. In his first season back, De Jong led Cambuur to the top of the Eerste Divisie table by eleven points when the COVID-19 pandemic forced the abandonment of the competition. The Royal Dutch Football Association (KNVB) ruled that no promotion or relegation would take place; Cambuur challenged the decision in court but lost. He won the Eerste Divisie title the following season, however, securing promotion to the Eredivisie. In August 2021, he was awarded the Rinus Michels Award as Manager of the Year in professional football. In the 2021–22 Eredivisie season, Cambuur finished ninth—the highest league position in the club's history.

In December 2021, De Jong was diagnosed with a cyst in his head and was briefly absent from his duties. In March 2022, Cambuur announced that his health would prevent him from completing the 2021–22 season, and in October 2022 he resigned with immediate effect, citing his health. In March 2023, the club announced that he had undergone a successful operation to remove the cyst. On 10 October 2023, following the dismissal of Sjors Ultee, De Jong returned as Cambuur's head coach—his fourth spell in that role at the club.

After a difficult opening to the 2025–26 season, in which Cambuur briefly sat near the bottom of the table, the club recovered to mount a promotion challenge. On 25 March 2026, Cambuur secured promotion to the Eredivisie as runners-up with a 4–2 victory away at Emmen, finishing behind champions ADO Den Haag. On the same day, De Jong announced he would step down as head coach at the end of the season, signing a new four-year contract as assistant coach. He cited his home situation as the primary reason: "The most important reason for this step is my home situation. I want to give more time and attention to that." He described the timing as ideal: "At one of the absolute highlights, to be able to stop as head coach — you can't get it better than that." The promotion was his third with the club—having previously won the Eerste Divisie title in 2013 and 2021—and Cambuur regard him as the most successful manager in their history.

== Career statistics ==
As of match played 24 April 2026

Managerial record by team and tenure
| Team | From | To | Record | | | | |
| Team | From | To | P | W | D | L | Win % |
|---|---|---|---|---|---|---|---|
| Cambuur (caretaker) | 22 March 2013 | 30 June 2013 | 8 | 7 | 0 | 1 | 87.50 |
| Cambuur | 2 April 2014 | 9 February 2016 | 66 | 17 | 16 | 33 | 25.76 |
| De Graafschap | 1 January 2017 | 30 June 2019 | 102 | 41 | 20 | 41 | 40.20 |
| Cambuur | 1 July 2019 | 21 October 2022 | 95 | 62 | 10 | 23 | 65.26 |
| Cambuur | 10 October 2023 | Present | 115 | 59 | 22 | 34 | 51.30 |
| Total | | | 386 | 186 | 68 | 132 | 48.19 |

== Honours ==
Cambuur

- Eerste Divisie: 2012–13, 2020–21

Individual

- Rinus Michels Award: 2008–09, 2021
