= 2025–26 SC Cambuur season =

Dutch football club season

SC Cambuur
2025–26 season
- Manager: Henk de Jong
- Stadium: Kooi Stadion
- Eerste Divisie: 2025–26 Eerste Divisie
- KNVB Cup: 2025–26 KNVB Cup
- Top goalscorer: League: Ichem Ferrah (12 goals); All: Ichem Ferrah (12 goals)
- Highest home attendance: 15,000 SBV Vitesse (38th week)
- Lowest home attendance: 12,236 TOP Oss (2nd week)
- Average home league attendance: 13,609
- Biggest win: 4-0 (SBV Vitesse (a) 15th week MVV Maastricht (h) 21st week)
- Biggest defeat: 3-0 VVV-Venlo (a) 34th week
- All statistics correct as of 27 April 2026.

The 2025–26 season is the 52nd season for SC Cambuur, in the Eerste Divisie (3rd consecutive). The club finished the regular league season in 3rd place and promoted to Eredivisie

In the KNVB Cup, SC Cambuur's participation ended in 1st round following a 3–2 defeat to RKC Waalwijk.

Ichem Ferrah was the club’s top scorer during the season, scoring all his 12 goals in Eerste Divisie competitions.

Remco Balk and Thijs Jansen were the club’s most frequently featured players during the season, each recording 38 appearances in all competitions. Balk made 37 league appearances and played once in the KNVB Cup, while Jansen featured in all 38 league matches.

== Players ==
=== First-team squad ===
Source: Note: Flags indicate national team as defined under FIFA eligibility rules; some limited exceptions apply. Players may hold more than one non-FIFA nationality.

No.	Pos.	Nation	Player
1	GK	NED	Thijs Jansen
2	DF	MAR	Diyae Jermoumi
3	DF	NED	Jorn Berkhout
4	DF	MAR	Ismaël Baouf
6	DF	NED	Jamal Amofa
7	FW	NED	Remco Balk
8	MF	CUW	Nicky Souren
9	FW	NED	Kian Visser
10	MF	NED	Mark Diemers
11	FW	SWE	Oscar Sjöstrand
13	FW	AUT	Nicolas Binder
14	MF	BOE	Jort van der Sande
16	DF	NED	Rik Mulders
17	MF	FRA	Ethan Apkakou

No.	Pos.	Nation	Player
18	MF	GER	Tony Rölke
19	FW	NED	Iwan Henstra
20	MF	NED	Daan Visser
21	GK	NED	Jasper Meijster
22	DF	FIN	Tomas Galvez
24	DF	NED	Toni Jonker
25	DF	NED	Bram Marsman
26	FW	FRA	Ichem Ferrah
27	FW	NED	Wiebe Kooistra
30	FW	NED	Yoram van der Veen
31	GK	NED	Matthijs Kalisvaart
33	DF	NED	Jelte Priem
46	MF	NED	Jochem Nap
48	MF	NED	Wiebe van der Heide

== Transfers ==
=== In ===
Pos.	Player	Transferred from	Fee	Date
DF	(Netherlands) Jamal Amofa	(Bulgaria) Botev Plovdiv	Free	1 July 2025
FW	(Austria) Nicolas Binder	Austria Klagenfurt	Free	1 July 2025
FW	(Sweden) Oscar Sjöstrand	(Sweden) Sandvikens IF	€450,000	11 July 2025
DF	(Netherlands) Rik Mulders	(Netherlands) FC Den Bosch	€200,000	23 July 2025

=== Out ===
Pos.	Player	Transferred to	Fee	Date
FW	(Suriname) Jeredy Hilterman	(Germany) Arminia Bielefeld	End of loan	30 June 2025
FW	(Republic of Ireland) Jonathan Afolabi	(Belgium) K.V. Kortrijk	End of loan	30 June 2025
DF	(Finland) Tomas Galvez	(England) Manchester City F.C.	End of loan	30 June 2025
GK	(Netherlands) Brett Minnema	(Netherlands) VV Workum	Free	1 July 2025
MF	(Spain) Arnau Casas	(Portugal) S.C.U. Torreense		1 July 2025
DF	(Netherlands) Gabi Caschili		No club	1 July 2025
FW	(Netherlands) Ilias Alhaft	(Thailand) Bangkok United F.C.	Free	1 July 2025
MF	(Netherlands) Maikel Kieftenbeld		End of career	1 July 2025
FW	(Netherlands) Michael de Leeuw	(Netherlands) GV Groen Geel	Free	1 July 2025
MF	(Netherlands) Steyn Potma	(Netherlands) Harkemase Boys	Free	1 July 2025
DF	(Norway) Sturla Ottesen		No club	1 July 2025
GK	(Netherlands) Thijmen Renkel	(Netherlands) Asser Christelijke Voetbalvereniging	Free	1 July 2025
DF	(Netherlands) Thomas Poll	(Netherlands) Helmond Sport	Free	1 July 2025
DF	(Netherlands) Bryant Nieling	(Italy) Modena FC 2018	€900,000	7 July 2025
DF	(Netherlands) Floris Smand	(Spain) CD Eldense	Free	11 July 2025
GK	(Netherlands) Daan Reiziger	(Netherlands) SC Telstar	Free	14 July 2025
DF	(Curaçao) Tyrique Mercera	(Netherlands) FC Groningen	€663,000	17 July 2025
FW	(Belgium) Benjamin Pauwels	(Spain) CD Leganés	€1,300,000	21 July 2025
MF	(Netherlands) Marcel Schaapman	(Netherlands) RKC Waalwijk	Free	29 July 2025
DF	(Netherlands) Jeremy van Mullem	(Cyprus) Omonia Aradippou	Free	13 August 2025

== Competitions ==
=== Overall record ===
Competition	First match	Last match	Starting round	Final position	Record							
Competition	First match	Last match	Starting round	Final position	Pld	W	D	L	GF	GA	GD	Win %
Eerste Divisie	8 August 2025	24 April 2026	Week 1	2nd	38	23	9	6	75	48	+27	60.53
KNVB Cup	29 October 2025	29 October 2025	1st round	1st round	1	0	0	1	2	3	−1	0.00
Total					39	23	9	7	77	51	+26	58.97

Source: ESPN

=== Eerste Divisie ===
==== Results summary ====
Overall								Home						Away					
Pld	W	D	L	GF	GA	GD	Pts	W	D	L	GF	GA	GD	W	D	L	GF	GA	GD
38	23	9	6	75	48	+27	78	13	5	1	42	21	+21	10	4	5	33	27	+6

Last updated: 27 April 2026.
Source: Eerste Divisie

==== Results by round ====
Round	1	2	3	4	5	6	7	8	9	10	11	12	13	14	15	16	17	18	19	20	21	22	23	24	25	26	27	28	29	30	31	32	33	34	35	36	37	38
Ground	A	H	A	H	H	A	A	H	A	H	H	A	A	H	A	A	H	H	H	A	H	A	A	A	H	H	A	H	H	H	A	H	A	A	H	A	A	H
Result	L	W	W	W	D	W	W	W	D	W	W	D	L	W	W	D	W	D	W	W	W	W	L	W	D	W	W	W	W	D	W	L	W	L	D	D	L	W
Position	15	11	6	4			3	2		2		2			2	2	2	2	2	2	2	2	2	2	2	2	2	2	2	2	2	2	2	2	2	2	2	2

Source: ESPN
A = Away; H = Home; W = Win; D = Draw; L = Loss

=== Matches ===
==== 1st half ====
8 August 2025 1st week	FC Dordrecht	1–0	SC Cambuur	Dordrecht
20:00	Yannick Eduardo 28'	Report		Stadium: M-Scores Stadion; Attendance: 2,544; Referee: Alex Bos

15 August 2025 2nd week	SC Cambuur	1–0	TOP Oss	Leeuwarden
20:00	Oscar Sjöstrand 6'	Report		Stadium: Kooi Stadion; Attendance: 12,236; Referee: Rob Dieperink

25 August 2025 3rd week	Jong AZ	0–1	SC Cambuur	The Hague
20:00		Report	Nick Twisk 16' (o.g.)	Stadium: AFAS Trainingscomplex; Attendance: 850; Referee: Stan Teuben

31 August 2025 4th week	SC Cambuur	3–1	VVV-Venlo	Leeuwarden
16:45	Oscar Sjöstrand 15'; Tony Rölke 32'; Ismaël Baouf 53'	Report	Gabin Blancquart 64'	Stadium: Kooi Stadion; Attendance: 12,473; Referee: Joey Kooij

6 September 2025 5th week	SC Cambuur	2–2	Willem II Tilburg	Leeuwarden
20:00	Ichem Ferrah 50'; Kian Visser 89'	Report	Ismaël Baouf 25' (o.g.); Feliciano de Ruijeter 83'	Stadium: Kooi Stadion; Attendance: 13,287; Referee: Bas Nijhuis

12 September 2025 6th week	MVV Maastricht	0–1	SC Cambuur	Maastricht
20:00		Report	Mark Diemers 24'	Stadium: De Geusselt; Attendance: 3,600; Referee: Richard Martens

22 September 2025 7th week	Jong FC Utrecht	2–4	SC Cambuur	Utrecht
20:00	Miliano Jonathans 39'; Noah Ohio 51'	Report	Mark Diemers 16'; Oscar Sjöstrand 17' 66'; Remco Balk 23'	Stadium: Sportcomplex Zoudenbalch; Attendance: 455; Referee: Kevin Puts

26 September 2025 8th week	SC Cambuur	5–3	Jong PSV	Leeuwarden
20:00	Jort van der Sande 15' 39'; Oscar Sjöstrand 36'; Jorn Berkhout 55'; Nicky Souren 84'	Report	Sami Bouhoudane 30'; Tai Abed 48' (pen.) 70'	Stadium: Kooi Stadion; Attendance: 13,177; Referee: Martijn Vos

29 September 2025 9th week	Roda JC Kerkrade	1–1	SC Cambuur	Kerkrade
20:00	Anthony van den Hurk 8'	Report	Ichem Ferrah 38'	Stadium: Parkstad Limburg Stadion; Attendance: 7,076; Referee: Martin van den Kerkhof

3 October 2025 10th week	SC Cambuur	3–2	FC Emmen	Leeuwarden
20:00	Remco Balk 34' 55'; Ichem Ferrah 73'	Report	Romano Postema 31'; Tim Geypens 81'	Stadium: Kooi Stadion; Attendance: 13,121; Referee: Marc Nagtegaal

11 October 2025 11th week	SC Cambuur	2–0	De Graafschap	Leeuwarden
21:00	Bram Marsman 45+1'; Yorem van der Veen 87'	Report		Stadium: Kooi Stadion; Attendance: 14,215; Referee: Sander van der Eijk

17 October 2025 12th week	Almere City FC	1–1	SC Cambuur	Almere
20:00	Teun Bijleveld 55'	Report	Iwan Henstra 70'	Stadium: Yanmar Stadion; Attendance: 3,664; Referee: Jannick van der Laan

24 October 2025 13th week	RKC Waalwijk	4–2	SC Cambuur	Waalwijk
20:00	Jesper Uneken 40'; Roy Kuijpers 43'; Tim van der Leij 74' 90+2'	Report	Wiebe Kooistra 56'; Remco Balk 67'	Stadium: Mandemakers Stadion; Attendance: 5,200; Referee: Robin Hensgens

1 November 2025 14th week	SC Cambuur	4–1	Jong Ajax	Leeuwarden
20:00	Bram Marsman 8'; Tony Rölke 23'; Oscar Sjöstrand 66'; Iwan Henstra 90+3'	Report	Nassef Chourak 10'	Stadium: Kooi Stadion; Attendance: 14,133; Referee: Laurens Gerrets

7 November 2025 15th week	SBV Vitesse	0–4	SC Cambuur	Arnhem
20:00		Report	Remco Balk 21' 45+1'; Mark Diemers 43'; Tony Rölke 79'	Stadium: Gelredome; Attendance: 17,551; Referee: Bas Nijhuis

15 November 2025 16th week	FC Eindhoven	3–3	SC Cambuur	Eindhoven
18:45	Sven Simons 35'; Thijs Muller 39'; Daan Huisman 86'	Report	Mark Diemers 45' (pen.); Ismaël Baouf 73'; Jort van der Sande 90+5'	Stadium: Jan Louwers Stadion; Attendance: 3,164; Referee: Alex Bos

21 November 2025 17th week	SC Cambuur	2–0	ADO Den Haag	Leeuwarden
20:00	Oscar Sjöstrand 76'; Jort van der Sande 88'	Report		Stadium: Kooi Stadion; Attendance: 14,866; Referee: Serdar Gözübüyük

28 November 2025 18th week	SC Cambuur	0–0	Helmond Sport	Leeuwarden
20:00		Report		Stadium: Kooi Stadion; Attendance: 13,132; Referee: Joey Kooij

5 December 2025 19th week	SC Cambuur	2–1	FC Den Bosch	Leeuwarden
20:00	Oscar Sjöstrand 6'; Tony Rölke 10'	Report	Kévin Monzialo 33'	Stadium: Kooi Stadion; Attendance: 12,315; Referee: Alex Bos

12 December 2025 20th week	Willem II Tilburg	0–1	SC Cambuur	Tilburg
20:00		Report	Ichem Ferrah 90'	Stadium: Koning Willem II Stadion; Attendance: 13,521; Referee: Allard Lindhout

19 December 2025 21st week	SC Cambuur	4–0	MVV Maastricht	Leeuwarden
20:00	Oscar Sjöstrand 11'; Ismaël Baouf 61'; Tony Rölke 71'; Iwan Henstra 78'	Report		Stadium: Kooi Stadion; Attendance: 13,328; Referee: Stan Teuben

==== 2nd half ====
16 January 2026 22nd week	ADO Den Haag	1–2	SC Cambuur	The Hague
20:00	Jesse Bal 88'	Report	Jort van der Sande 16'; Remco Balk 23'	Stadium: WerkTalent Stadion; Attendance: 12,855; Referee: Robin Hensgens

2 February 2026 23rd week	Jong PSV	3–2	SC Cambuur	Eindhoven
20:00	Joël van den Berg 17'; Nicolas Verkooijen 21'; Fabio Kluit 55'	Report	Ismaël Baouf 79'; Mark Diemers 87' (pen.)	Stadium: WerkTalent Stadion; Attendance: 596; Referee: Martin Fernando Perezlindo

20 February 2026 24th week	Jong Ajax	1–2	SC Cambuur	Duivendrecht
20:00	Mohamed Abdalla 84'	Report	Mark Diemers 16' (pen.); Ismaël Baouf 88'	Stadium: Sportpark De Toekomst; Attendance: 1,129; Referee: Thomas Hardeman

20 February 2026 25th week	SC Cambuur	1–1	RKC Waalwijk	Leeuwarden
20:00	Jort van der Sande 90+7'	Report	Denilho Cleonise 30'	Stadium: Kooi Stadion; Attendance: 13,254; Referee: Joey Kooij

24 February 2026 26th week	SC Cambuur	2–1	FC Eindhoven	Leeuwarden
20:00	Ismaël Baouf 64'; Iwan Henstra 84'	Report	Rangelo Janga 29' (pen.)	Stadium: Kooi Stadion; Attendance: 13,401; Referee: Martijn Vos

27 February 2026 27th week	TOP Oss	1–2	SC Cambuur	Oss
20:00	Yaid Marhoum 89' (pen.)	Report	Ichem Ferrah 70'; Nicky Souren 79'	Stadium: Frans Heesen Stadion; Attendance: 2,230; Referee: Ingmar Oostrom

3 March 2026 28th week	SC Cambuur	3–2	Almere City FC	Leeuwarden
20:00	Jort van der Sande 64' 35'; Jamal Amofa 47'	Report	Milan de Haan 24'; Olivier de Nijs 86'	Stadium: Kooi Stadion; Attendance: 13,450; Referee: Alex Bos

8 March 2026 29th week	SC Cambuur	1–0	Jong FC Utrecht	Leeuwarden
16:45	Oscar Sjöstrand 63'	Report		Stadium: Kooi Stadion; Attendance: 14,233; Referee: Laurens Gerrets

13 March 2026 30th week	SC Cambuur	1–1	Roda JC Kerkrade	Leeuwarden
20:00	Ichem Ferrah 52' (pen.)	Report	Michael Breij 46'	Stadium: Kooi Stadion; Attendance: 14,236; Referee: Edwin van de Graaf

27 February 2026 31st week	Helmond Sport	0–1	SC Cambuur	Helmond
20:00		Report	Ichem Ferrah 2'	Stadium: GS Staalwerken Stadion; Attendance: 2,048; Referee: Martin van den Kerkhof

20 March 2026 32nd week	SC Cambuur	3–4	Jong AZ	Leeuwarden
20:00	Iwan Henstra 38'; Ichem Ferrah 78' 81'	Report	Jasper Hartog 10'; Jesper Zwart 58'; Yoël Van Den Ban 87' (pen.); Bendegúz Kovács 90+3'	Stadium: Kooi Stadion; Attendance: 14,823; Referee: Wouter Wiersma

24 March 2026 33rd week	FC Emmen	2–4	SC Cambuur	Emmen
20:00	Romano Postema 45+1'; Freddy Quispel 84'	Report	Ichem Ferrah 6' 49'; Fabian Kvam 21' 23'	Stadium: De Oude Meerdijk; Attendance: 7,837; Referee: Dennis Higler

3 April 2026 34th week	VVV-Venlo	3–0	SC Cambuur	Venlo
20:00	Dean Zandbergen 15' 80' 87'	Report		Stadium: De Koel; Attendance: 11,909; Referee: Alex Bos

6 April 2026 35th week	SC Cambuur	1–1	FC Dordrecht	Leeuwarden
16:45	Mark Diemers 64'	Report	Diyae Jermoumi 81' (o.g.)	Stadium: Kooi Stadion; Attendance: 13,885; Referee: Erwin Blank

10 April 2026 36th week	FC Den Bosch	1–1	SC Cambuur	Venlo
20:00	Jack de Vries 57'	Report	Mark Diemers 90+4'	Stadium: De Koel; Attendance: 5,873; Referee: Richard Martens

17 April 2026 37th week	De Graafschap	3–1	SC Cambuur	Doetinchem
20:00	Nathan Kaninda 29'; Levi Schoppema 45+1'; Joran Hardeman 63'	Report	Jort van der Sande 19'	Stadium: De Vijverberg; Attendance: 11,909; Referee: Alex Bos

24 April 2026 38th week	SC Cambuur	2–1	SBV Vitesse	Leeuwarden
20:00	Mark Diemers 51'; Ichem Ferrah 85'	Report	Naoufal Bannis 42'	Stadium: Kooi Stadion; Attendance: 15,000; Referee: Martin van den Kerkhof

=== KNVB Cup ===
29 October 2025 1st round	RKC Waalwijk	3–2	SC Cambuur	Waalwijk
20:00	Tim van der Leij 39'; Juan Castillo 50'; Nazjir Held 74'	Report	Tony Rölke 52'; Mark Diemers 56' (pen.)	Stadium: Mandemakers Stadion; Referee: Richard Martens

== Statistics ==
=== Scorers ===
#	Player	Eerste Divisie	KNVB	Total
1	(France) Ichem Ferrah	12	0	12
2	(Netherlands) Mark Diemers	9	1	10
2	(Sweden) Oscar Sjöstrand	10	0	10
4	(Netherlands) Jort van der Sande	9	0	9
5	(Netherlands) Remco Balk	7	0	7
6	(Belgium) Ismaël Baouf	6	0	6
6	(Germany) Tony Rölke	5	1	6
8	(Netherlands) Iwan Henstra	5	0	5
9	(Netherlands) Bram Marsman	2	0	2
9	(Norway) Fabian Kvam	2	0	2
9	(Netherlands) Nicky Souren	2	0	2
12	(Netherlands) Jamal Amofa	1	0	1
12	(Netherlands) Jorn Berkhout	1	0	1
12	(Netherlands) Kian Visser	1	0	1
12	(Netherlands) Wiebe Kooistra	1	0	1

=== Assists ===
#	Player	Eredivisie	KNVB	Total
1	(Netherlands) Mark Diemers	11	0	11
2	(Sweden) Oscar Sjöstrand	7	0	7
3	(France) Jamal Amofa	6	0	6
3	(France) Ichem Ferrah	6	0	6
5	(Netherlands) Remco Balk	4	0	4
5	(Finland) Tomas Galvez	4	0	4
7	(Netherlands) Iwan Henstra	2	0	2
7	(Netherlands) Jort van der Sande	2	0	2
7	(Austria) Nicolas Binder	2	0	2
7	(Netherlands) Rik Mulders	2	0	2
7	(Germany) Tony Rölke	2	0	2
12	(Netherlands) Daan Visser	1	0	1
12	(Morocco) Diyae-Edinne Jermoumi	1	0	1
12	(France) Ethan Apkakou	1	0	1
12	(Belgium) Ismaël Baouf	1	0	1
12	(Netherlands) Kian Visser	1	0	1
12	(Netherlands) Thijs Jansen	1	0	1

=== Appearances ===
#	Player	Eredivisie	KNVB	Total
1	(Netherlands) Remco Balk	37	1	38
1	(Netherlands) Thijs Jansen	38	0	38
3	(Netherlands) Jamal Amofa	36	1	37
3	(Finland) Tomas Galvez	36	1	37
5	(France) Ichem Ferrah	35	1	36
6	(Netherlands) Jort van der Sande	34	1	35
6	(Netherlands) Mark Diemers	34	1	35
6	(Germany) Tony Rölke	34	1	35
9	(Sweden) Oscar Sjöstrand	32	1	33
10	(Netherlands) Nicky Souren	30	1	31
11	(Belgium) Ismaël Baouf	29	1	30
11	(Netherlands) Rik Mulders	30	0	30
13	(Netherlands) Wiebe Kooistra	25	1	26
14	(Netherlands) Iwan Henstra	25	0	25
15	(Netherlands) Bram Marsman	24	0	24
16	(Netherlands) Jorn Berkhout	21	1	22
17	(Netherlands) Kian Visser	21	0	21
18	(Morocco) Diyae-Edinne Jermoumi	16	0	16
19	(Austria) Nicolas Binder	13	1	14
20	(France) Ethan Apkakou	11	0	11
21	(Netherlands) Toni Jonker	10	0	10
22	(Netherlands) Daan Visser	9	0	9
23	(Netherlands) Jochem Nap	7	1	8
23	(Netherlands) Yorem van der Veen	7	1	8
25	(Norway) Fabian Kvam	7	0	7
26	(Netherlands) Danyello Look	2	0	2
27	(Netherlands) Jasper Meijster	0	1	1
27	(Netherlands) Jelte Priem	1	0	1
27	(Netherlands) Sybrand Veldhuis	1	0	1
27	(Netherlands) Wiebe van der Heide	1	0	1

=== Clean sheets ===
#	Player	Eerste Divisie
1	(Netherlands) Thijs Jansen	11

=== Disciplinary record ===
#	Player	Eredivisie		KNVB		Total	
#	Player	Booked	Sent off (straight red)	Booked	Sent off (straight red)	Booked	Sent off (straight red)
1	(Netherlands) Remco Balk	3	1	1	0	4	1
2	(Netherlands) Jorn Berkhout	1	1	0	0	1	1
3	(Netherlands) Jamal Amofa	7	0	1	0	8	0
4	(Belgium) Ismaël Baouf	6	0	0	0	6	0
4	(Netherlands) Nicky Souren	6	0	0	0	6	0
6	(Netherlands) Mark Diemers	5	0	0	0	5	0
6	(Netherlands) Rik Mulders	5	0	0	0	5	0
8	(Netherlands) Jort van der Sande	4	0	0	0	4	0
8	(Finland) Tomas Galvez	4	0	0	0	4	0
10	(Sweden) Oscar Sjöstrand	3	0	0	0	3	0
10	(Germany) Tony Rölke	2	0	1	0	3	0
12	(Netherlands) Daan Visser	2	0	0	0	2	0
12	(France) Ethan Apkakou	2	0	0	0	2	0
12	(Netherlands) Iwan Henstra	2	0	0	0	2	0
12	(Netherlands) Kian Visser	2	0	0	0	2	0
16	(Netherlands) Bram Marsman	1	0	0	0	1	0
16	(Norway) Fabian Kvam	1	0	0	0	1	0
16	(France) Ichem Ferrah	1	0	0	0	1	0
16	(Netherlands) Thijs Jansen	1	0	0	0	1	0
16	(Netherlands) Yorem van der Veen	1	0	0	0	1	0
