= List of Dutch football transfers summer 2026 =

This is a list of Dutch football transfers for the 2026 summer transfer window. Only transfers featuring Eredivisie are listed.

== Eredivisie ==
Note: Flags indicate national team as has been defined under FIFA eligibility rules. Players may hold more than one non-FIFA nationality.

=== PSV ===
In:

No.	Pos.	Nation	Player
2	DF	NED	Lutsharel Geertruida (on loan from (Germany) RB Leipzig, previously on loan at (England) Sunderland)
11	FW	NED	Sami Ouaissa (from NEC)
18	DF	SRB	Filip Kostić (from (Italy) Juventus)
21	MF	NED	Sven Mijnans (from AZ)
23	FW	DEN	Mikkel Bro Hansen (from (Norway) Bodø/Glimt)
24	MF	JPN	Kodai Sano (from NEC)
29	FW	NED	Sam Lammers (from Twente)
32	GK	CZE	Matěj Kovář (from (Germany) Bayer Leverkusen, previously on loan)
35	MF	CPV	Ayoni Santos (from Sparta Rotterdam)

Out:

No.	Pos.	Nation	Player
2	DF	MAR	Anass Salah-Eddine (loan return to (Italy) Roma)
11	FW	MAR	Couhaib Driouech (to (Spain) Celta Vigo)
21	FW	NED	Myron Boadu (to (England) Watford)
23	MF	NED	Joey Veerman (to (Germany) Borussia Dortmund)
24	GK	NED	Niek Schiks (on loan to RKC Waalwijk)
34	MF	MAR	Ismael Saibari (to (Germany) Bayern Munich)
35	MF	NED	Joël van den Berg (to (Scotland) Celtic)
—	MF	NED	Isaac Babadi (on loan to Sparta Rotterdam, previously on loan at (Belgium) Royal Antwerp)
—	GK	NED	Joël Drommel (to Twente, previously on loan at Sparta Rotterdam)

=== Feyenoord ===
In:

No.	Pos.	Nation	Player
1	GK	GER	Tjark Ernst (from (Germany) Hertha BSC)
16	DF	ESP	Javi López (on loan from (Spain) Real Sociedad, previously on loan at (Spain) Real Oviedo)
17	FW	ENG	Reiss Nelson (from (England) Arsenal, previously on loan at (England) Brentford)
19	FW	ESP	Nacho Ferri (from (Belgium) Westerlo)
33	GK	GER	Florian Kastenmeier (from (Germany) Fortuna Düsseldorf)
34	MF	BEL	Charles Vanhoutte (from (France) Nice)
35	DF	ESP	Mika Mármol (from (Spain) Las Palmas)

Out:

No.	Pos.	Nation	Player
6	MF	KOR	Hwang In-beom (to (Portugal) Porto)
9	FW	JPN	Ayase Ueda (to (France) Lille)
13	GK	GER	Steven Benda (loan return to (England) Fulham)
16	FW	SVK	Leo Sauer (to (Germany) VfB Stuttgart)
17	FW	DEN	Casper Tengstedt (to (France) Toulouse)
18	DF	AUT	Gernot Trauner (retired)
19	FW	ENG	Raheem Sterling (free agent)
21	DF	BIH	Anel Ahmedhodžić (to (England) Burnley)
22	GK	GER	Timon Wellenreuther (to (Germany) VfL Wolfsburg)
25	MF	SUR	Shiloh 't Zand (on loan to Fortuna Sittard)
30	DF	SUI	Jordan Lotomba (to (Scotland) Celtic)
31	DF	SWE	Malcolm Jeng (loan return to (France) Reims)
32	FW	NED	Aymen Sliti (on loan to Excelsior)
—	DF	NED	Jan Plug (on loan to Excelsior, previously on loan at Dordrecht)
—	FW	NED	Jaden Slory (on loan to Willem II, previously on loan at Go Ahead Eagles)
—	GK	BUL	Plamen Andreev (to (Hungary) Debrecen, previously on loan at (Poland) Lech Poznań)
—	DF	CRC	Jeyland Mitchell (to (Austria) LASK, previously on loan)
—	DF	NED	Neraysho Kasanwirjo (to (Norway) Brann, previously on loan at Fortuna Sittard)
—	MF	ALG	Ramiz Zerrouki (to Twente, previously on loan)
—	MF	NED	Calvin Stengs (to AZ, previously on loan at (Italy) Pisa)
—	MF	CRO	Luka Ivanušec (to (Croatia) Dinamo Zagreb, previously on loan at (Greece) PAOK)
—	MF	CIV	Chris-Kévin Nadje (to (Belgium) Eupen, previously on loan at (United States) Monterey Bay)

=== NEC ===
In:

No.	Pos.	Nation	Player
4	DF	NED	Perr Schuurs (free agent)
7	FW	TUR	Emre Mor (from (Turkey) Fenerbahçe)
10	MF	SRB	Dušan Tadić (from (United Arab Emirates) Al Wahda)
12	GK	AUT	Nikolas Polster (from (Austria) Wolfsberger)
14	FW	NED	Kaj Sierhuis (from Fortuna Sittard)
18	MF	GER	Dennis Geiger (from (Germany) TSG Hoffenheim, previously on loan at (Scotland) Aberdeen)
19	MF	MAR	Adam Tahaui (from Vitesse)
21	DF	DEN	Tobias Storm (from (Denmark) Lyngby)
22	DF	TUR	Ahmetcan Kaplan (from Ajax, previously on loan)
35	MF	CPV	Jamiro Monteiro (from PEC Zwolle)
66	DF	GER	Almugera Kabar (on loan from (Germany) Borussia Dortmund)
73	DF	POR	Gabriel Brás (on loan from (Portugal) Porto B)
77	MF	NED	Ayodele Thomas (from (Germany) RB Leipzig)
99	MF	DEN	Clement Bischoff (on loan from (Austria) Red Bull Salzburg)

Out:

No.	Pos.	Nation	Player
2	DF	FRA	Brayann Pereira (to (England) West Bromwich Albion)
5	DF	NED	Thomas Ouwejan (to (Japan) Machida Zelvia)
7	FW	SUR	Virgil Misidjan (free agent)
9	FW	BRA	Danilo (loan return to (Scotland) Rangers)
11	FW	TUR	Başar Önal (to (France) Lille)
14	DF	ISR	Eli Dasa (free agent)
15	DF	NED	Jetro Willems (free agent)
18	FW	JPN	Kōki Ogawa (to (Japan) Machida Zelvia)
22	GK	NED	Jasper Cillessen (free agent)
24	MF	JPN	Kodai Sano (to PSV)
25	FW	NED	Sami Ouaissa (to PSV)
31	GK	NED	Rijk Janse (to Groningen)
34	FW	MAR	Youssef El Kachati (to (France) Reims)
71	MF	NED	Dirk Proper (to Heerenveen)
—	DF	NED	Yousri Sbai (on loan to Jong Utrecht, previously on loan at VVV-Venlo)
—	MF	NED	Luc Nieuwenhuijs (to Jong Sparta, previously on loan)
—	MF	ESP	Rober (to (Spain) Albacete, previously on loan at (Spain) Real Zaragoza)
—	MF	GRE	Argyris Darelas (to (Greece) Niki Volos, previously on loan at Dordrecht)
—	MF	NED	Vito van Crooij (to Willem II, previously on loan at Sparta Rotterdam)

=== Twente ===
In:

No.	Pos.	Nation	Player
2	DF	POL	Michał Rosiak (from (Poland) Śląsk Wrocław)
6	MF	ALG	Ramiz Zerrouki (from Feyenoord, previously on loan)
9	FW	NED	Wout Weghorst (from Ajax)
16	GK	NED	Joël Drommel (from PSV, previously on loan at Sparta Rotterdam)
17	FW	NOR	Filip Thorvaldsen (from (Norway) Vålerenga)
18	MF	NED	Jordy Bawuah (from Jong PSV)
22	GK	NED	Remko Pasveer (from Heracles Almelo)
24	DF	POL	Krzysztof Kurowski (from (Poland) Śląsk Wrocław)
29	DF	DEN	Aske Adelgaard (from Go Ahead Eagles)

Out:

No.	Pos.	Nation	Player
2	DF	IDN	Mees Hilgers (to Heerenveen)
4	MF	NOR	Mathias Kjølø (to (Norway) Rosenborg)
8	MF	USA	Taylor Booth (on loan to (United States) Real Salt Lake)
9	FW	NED	Ricky van Wolfswinkel (to VV Woudenberg)
10	FW	NED	Sam Lammers (to PSV)
12	DF	POR	Guilherme Peixoto (on loan to Roda JC)
21	GK	NED	Sam Karssies (on loan to Emmen)
22	GK	POL	Przemysław Tytoń (free agent)
32	MF	BEL	Arno Verschueren (to (Belgium) Beveren)
39	DF	NED	Mats Rots (to (Germany) TSG Hoffenheim)
52	GK	MAR	Issam El Maach (free agent)
—	DF	NED	Bas Kuipers (to Sparta Rotterdam, previously on loan at (Portugal) Arouca)
—	DF	BEL	Alec Van Hoorenbeeck (to (Croatia) Hajduk Split, previously on loan at Heracles Almelo)
—	MF	NED	Harrie Kuster (to Telstar, previously on loan at RKC Waalwijk)
—	MF	TUN	Sayfallah Ltaief (to (Poland) Cracovia, previously on loan at (Germany) Greuther Fürth)

=== Ajax ===
In:

No.	Pos.	Nation	Player
1	GK	GER	Marc-André ter Stegen (on loan from (Spain) Barcelona, previously on loan at (Spain) Girona)
4	MF	MAR	Sofyan Amrabat (from (Turkey) Fenerbahçe, previously on loan at (Spain) Real Betis)
6	DF	GER	Thilo Kehrer (on loan from (France) Monaco)
7	FW	CIV	Simon Adingra (on loan from (England) Sunderland, previously on loan at (France) Monaco)
8	MF	GER	Julian Brandt (from (Germany) Borussia Dortmund)
11	FW	UKR	Viktor Tsyhankov (from (Spain) Girona)
12	DF	BRA	Caio Henrique (from (France) Monaco)
17	DF	NED	Daley Blind (from (Spain) Girona)
21	DF	ESP	Jofre Torrents (from (Spain) Barcelona)
28	MF	MLI	Yves Bissouma (free agent)
38	FW	BRA	Marcos Leonardo (from (Saudi Arabia) Al-Hilal)
99	FW	NGR	Tolu Arokodare (on loan from (England) Wolverhampton Wanderers)

Out:

No.	Pos.	Nation	Player
1	GK	CZE	Vítězslav Jaroš (loan return to (England) Liverpool)
4	DF	JPN	Ko Itakura (to (Germany) Borussia Mönchengladbach)
6	MF	NED	Youri Regeer (on loan to (Germany) Werder Bremen)
7	FW	ARG	Maher Carrizo (on loan to (Denmark) Copenhagen)
11	FW	BEL	Mika Godts (to (France) Paris Saint-Germain)
19	FW	NED	Don-Angelo Konadu (on loan to (Belgium) Lommel)
25	FW	NED	Wout Weghorst (to Twente)
28	MF	NED	Kian Fitz-Jim (to (Italy) Torino)
32	DF	JPN	Takehiro Tomiyasu (to (England) Crystal Palace)
37	DF	CRO	Josip Šutalo (on loan to (Italy) Lazio)
47	DF	UKR	Oleksandr Zinchenko (free agent)
48	MF	NED	Sean Steur (to (England) Newcastle United)
—	DF	TUR	Ahmetcan Kaplan (to NEC, previously on loan)
—	MF	NOR	Sivert Mannsverk (to (Czech Republic) Sparta Prague, previously on loan)
—	MF	NED	Branco van den Boomen (to (France) Angers, previously on loan)
—	FW	ENG	Chuba Akpom (to (England) Ipswich Town, previously on loan)
—	FW	NED	Amourricho van Axel Dongen (free agent, previously on loan at Heerenveen)

=== Utrecht ===
In:

No.	Pos.	Nation	Player
5	DF	CYP	Nikolas Panagiotou (from (Cyprus) Omonia)
6	DF	NED	Guus Offerhaus (from Telstar)
8	MF	NED	Joris van Overeem (from Heerenveen)
11	FW	ESP	Ángel Alarcón (from (Portugal) Porto, previously on loan)
17	FW	NED	Sem van Duijn (on loan from AZ, previously on loan at Telstar)
18	DF	CRO	Jakov Medić (on loan from (England) Norwich City)
22	GK	NED	Sergio Padt (free agent)
24	DF	GER	Jamie Schuldes (from (Germany) RB Leipzig youth)
30	MF	USA	Kevin Paredes (from (Germany) VfL Wolfsburg)
39	MF	MAR	Nordin Amrabat (from (Morocco) Wydad)
47	FW	GER	Emmanuel Chigozie Owen (from (Germany) Bayer Leverkusen youth)
80	FW	NOR	Marius Broholm (on loan from (France) Lille)
92	DF	BFA	Arthur Zagré (from Excelsior)

Out:

No.	Pos.	Nation	Player
3	DF	NED	Mike van der Hoorn (to (Cyprus) AEK Larnaca)
5	DF	ENG	Emeka Adiele (on loan to (England) Burton Albion)
8	MF	GER	Can Bozdoğan (to (Turkey) Çaykur Rizespor)
9	FW	NED	David Min (on loan to (Germany) Arminia Bielefeld)
11	FW	SWE	Jesper Karlsson (loan return to (Italy) Bologna)
14	MF	IRQ	Zidane Iqbal (to (Scotland) Dundee United)
16	DF	MAR	Souffian El Karouani (to (Saudi Arabia) Al-Qadsiah)
17	FW	TUR	Emirhan Demircan (on loan to Telstar)
21	MF	NED	Gjivai Zechiël (loan return to Feyenoord)
22	MF	ESP	Miguel Rodríguez (to (Spain) Deportivo Alavés)
24	DF	NED	Nick Viergever (to PEC Zwolle)
25	GK	NED	Michael Brouwer (to Sparta Rotterdam)
43	MF	MAR	Rafik El Arguioui (on loan to Cambuur)
44	DF	NED	Mike Eerdhuijzen (to (Belgium) Mechelen)
91	FW	CIV	Sébastien Haller (to (Japan) Sanfrecce Hiroshima)
—	GK	NED	Tom de Graaff (to PEC Zwolle, previously on loan)
—	FW	NED	Jesse van de Haar (to RKC Waalwijk, previously on loan at (Belgium) Beveren)

=== AZ ===
In:

No.	Pos.	Nation	Player
13	DF	NED	Sam de Grand (from (Belgium) Lommel)
14	MF	NED	Calvin Stengs (from Feyenoord, previously on loan at (Italy) Pisa)
16	MF	NED	Stije Resink (from Groningen)
17	MF	DEN	Valdemar Byskov (from (Denmark) Midtjylland)
20	DF	ITA	Andrea Natali (from (Germany) Bayer Leverkusen youth, previously on loan at Jong AZ)
28	GK	BEL	Jari De Busser (from Go Ahead Eagles)
29	DF	NED	Wesley Hoedt (from (Saudi Arabia) Al-Shabab)
—	DF	FRA	Abdelnour Soualhia (from (France) Le Puy)

Out:

No.	Pos.	Nation	Player
4	DF	NED	Maxim Dekker (to Willem II)
5	DF	POR	Alexandre Penetra (on loan to (Turkey) Çorum)
9	FW	IRL	Troy Parrott (to (Spain) Real Betis)
10	MF	NED	Sven Mijnans (to PSV)
11	FW	GHA	Ibrahim Sadiq (to (United States) Colorado Rapids)
13	DF	NED	Sam de Grand (on loan to (Belgium) Lommel)
17	FW	DEN	Isak Jensen (on loan to (France) Lorient)
20	MF	NED	Kasper Boogaard (on loan to Willem II)
23	DF	NED	Billy van Duijl (on loan to Cambuur)
31	GK	NED	Daniël Deen (free agent)
33	MF	CZE	Matěj Šín (on loan to ADO Den Haag)
—	DF	FRA	Abdelnour Soualhia (on loan to Telstar)
—	FW	NED	Sem van Duijn (on loan to Utrecht, previously on loan at Telstar)
—	FW	NED	Lequincio Zeefuik (on loan to Fortuna Sittard, previously on loan at Heracles Almelo)
—	GK	ESP	Sem Westerveld (to (Spain) Real Zaragoza, previously on loan at MVV)
—	MF	SRB	Kristijan Belić (to (Israel) Maccabi Tel Aviv, previously on loan)
—	MF	NED	Zico Buurmeester (to (Spain) Leganés, previously on loan at PEC Zwolle)
—	FW	SWE	Mayckel Lahdo (to (Sweden) Malmö, previously on loan at (Denmark) Brøndby)

=== Heerenveen ===
In:

No.	Pos.	Nation	Player
2	DF	IDN	Mees Hilgers (from Twente)
6	MF	NED	Dirk Proper (from NEC)
17	FW	LAT	Roberts Uldriķis (from (Germany) Arminia Bielefeld)
21	FW	IRQ	Marko Farji (from (Italy) Venezia)
23	DF	FRA	Darling Bladi (from (Spain) Betis Deportivo)
29	FW	FRA	Lanroy Machine (on loan from (France) Angers)
—	GK	NED	Sten Kremers (free agent)

Out:

No.	Pos.	Nation	Player
6	MF	NED	Joris van Overeem (to Utrecht)
8	MF	NED	Luuk Brouwers (to (Cyprus) Omonia)
17	DF	NOR	Nikolai Hopland (to (Denmark) Randers)
18	FW	NOR	Lasse Nordås (loan return to (England) Luton Town)
23	GK	NED	Jan Bekkema (free agent)
26	FW	NED	Amourricho van Axel Dongen (loan return to Ajax)
31	GK	NED	Nordin Bakker (to (Denmark) Midtjylland)
50	FW	NED	Eser Gürbüz (on loan to Willem II)

=== Groningen ===
In:

No.	Pos.	Nation	Player
4	DF	HUN	Márk Csinger (from (Hungary) Győr)
7	MF	NOR	Travis Hernes (from (England) Newcastle United, previously on loan)
11	FW	SWE	Jacob Ondrejka (on loan from (Italy) Parma)
12	DF	SVK	Nikolas Brandis (from (Slovakia) Trenčín)
16	MF	SWE	Alvin Nordin (from (Sweden) Helsingborg)
21	DF	SWE	Malcolm Jeng (on loan from (France) Reims, previously on loan at Feyenoord)
24	MF	NED	Pelle Clement (from Sparta Rotterdam)
30	GK	NED	Pelle Boevink (from (Germany) Greuther Fürth)
31	GK	NED	Rijk Janse (from NEC)
33	DF	NED	Hans Hateboer (free agent)

Out:

No.	Pos.	Nation	Player
4	DF	NED	Dies Janse (loan return to Jong Ajax)
6	MF	NED	Stije Resink (to AZ)
10	MF	MAR	Younes Taha (loan return to Twente)
20	MF	NED	Mats Seuntjens (to NAC Breda)
21	GK	NED	Hidde Jurjus (to Volendam)
22	DF	NED	Sven Bouland (to MVV)
24	GK	NED	Dirk Baron (to Emmen)
27	FW	POR	Rui Mendes (to Telstar)
43	DF	BEL	Marvin Peersman (to Telstar)
—	FW	NED	Fofin Turay (to Telstar)
—	MF	NED	Thijs Oosting (to PEC Zwolle, previously on loan)
—	FW	NED	Romano Postema (to (Norway) Viking, previously on loan at Emmen)
—	FW	RWA	Noam Emeran (to (Switzerland) Stade Lausanne Ouchy, previously on loan at Emmen)

=== Sparta Rotterdam ===
In:

No.	Pos.	Nation	Player
—	GK	NED	Michael Brouwer (from Utrecht)
—	DF	NED	Bas Kuipers (from Twente, previously on loan at (Portugal) Arouca)
—	DF	NED	Nick Verschuren (from Jong Ajax, previously on loan at Volendam)
—	MF	NED	Robin van Cruijsen (from Volendam)
—	MF	NED	Cedric Hatenboer (from (Belgium) Anderlecht, previously on loan at Telstar)
—	MF	NED	Isaac Babadi (on loan from PSV, previously on loan at (Belgium) Royal Antwerp)
—	FW	MNE	Andrej Kostić (on loan from (Italy) AC Milan)
—	FW	FIN	Casper Terho (from (Belgium) OH Leuven, previously on loan)

Out:

No.	Pos.	Nation	Player
—	GK	GER	Kaylen (to Fortuna Sittard)
—	GK	NED	Joël Drommel (loan return to PSV)
—	DF	COM	Saïd Bakari (free agent)
—	DF	NED	Patrick van Aanholt (free agent)
—	DF	NED	Mike Kleijn (on loan to Volendam)
—	DF	CUW	Shurandy Sambo (loan return to Burnley)
—	MF	CPV	Ayoni Santos (to PSV)
—	MF	NED	Pelle Clement (to Groningen)
—	MF	NED	Jonathan de Guzmán (retired)
—	MF	NED	Vito van Crooij (loan return to NEC)
—	MF	NOR	Joshua Kitolano (to (Norway) Bodø/Glimt)
—	MF	NED	Younes Jaber el Meftahi (on loan to Volendam)
—	FW	ISL	Nökkvi Þeyr Þórisson (reloan to Telstar)
—	FW	NOR	Tobias Lauritsen (to (Italy) Sampdoria)
—	GK	NED	Youri Schoonderwaldt (to VVV-Venlo, previously on loan)
—	DF	NED	Tijs Velthuis (to PEC Zwolle, previously on loan)
—	MF	NED	Lance Duijvestijn (to (Germany) Darmstadt 98, previously on loan at Fortuna Sittard)

=== Fortuna Sittard ===
In:

No.	Pos.	Nation	Player
2	DF	BEL	Siebe Wylin (from (Belgium) Club NXT)
3	DF	BRA	Rodrigo Guth (on loan from (Argentina) Talleres)
9	FW	BEL	Anthony Descotte (on loan from (Belgium) Charleroi, previously on loan at Volendam)
10	FW	IDN	Ole Romeny (on loan from (England) Oxford United)
14	MF	NED	Sven Simons (from FC Eindhoven)
15	DF	NED	Nick de Groot (from Den Bosch)
22	MF	SUR	Shiloh 't Zand (on loan from Feyenoord)
25	FW	NED	Lequincio Zeefuik (on loan from AZ, previously on loan at Heracles Almelo)
33	GK	GER	Kaylen (from Sparta Rotterdam)

Out:

No.	Pos.	Nation	Player
4	DF	BEL	Shawn Adewoye (to (Belgium) Lommel)
9	FW	NED	Kaj Sierhuis (to NEC)
10	MF	CRO	Alen Halilović (free agent)
17	MF	SUR	Justin Lonwijk (loan return to (Ukraine) Dynamo Kyiv)
18	MF	GRE	Dimitrios Limnios (loan return to (Greece) Panathinaikos)
19	FW	NED	Paul Gladon (to NAC Breda)
21	DF	NED	Neraysho Kasanwirjo (loan return to Feyenoord)
22	MF	COD	Samuel Bastien (free agent)
24	DF	NED	Daley Sinkgraven (free agent)
25	GK	NED	Niels Martens (free agent)
29	MF	TUR	Hasip Korkmazyürek (to (Turkey) Isparta 32)
32	GK	NED	Nick Marsman (to Go Ahead Eagles)
38	MF	NED	Tristan Schenkhuizen (to VVV-Venlo)
70	MF	NED	Lance Duijvestijn (loan return to Sparta Rotterdam)
71	GK	BEL	Ramazan Bayram (free agent)
77	MF	CRO	Luka Tunjić (free agent)
—	FW	TUR	Onur Demir (free agent, previously on loan at (Slovakia) Petržalka)

=== Go Ahead Eagles ===
In:

No.	Pos.	Nation	Player
1	GK	NOR	Kjetil Haug (from (France) Toulouse)
6	DF	CRO	Tino Jukić (from (Croatia) Lokomotiva)
22	GK	NED	Nick Marsman (from Fortuna Sittard)
27	DF	FIN	Tomas Galvez (from (England) Manchester City, previously on loan at Cambuur)
29	FW	NOR	Erik Flataker (from (Sweden) AIK)

Out:

No.	Pos.	Nation	Player
1	GK	GER	Luca Plogmann (to Cambuur)
7	MF	DEN	Jakob Breum (to (France) Saint-Étienne)
19	FW	NED	Jaden Slory (loan return to Feyenoord)
22	GK	BEL	Jari De Busser (to AZ)
24	MF	NED	Kenzo Goudmijn (loan return to (England) Derby County)
27	FW	NED	Finn Stokkers (to RKC Waalwijk)
29	DF	DEN	Aske Adelgaard (to Twente)
30	GK	NED	Sven Jansen (to TOP Oss)
—	DF	NED	Luca Everink (to Emmen, previously on loan)
—	MF	NED	Calvin Twigt (to Willem II, previously on loan)
—	MF	BEL	Xander Blomme (to FC Eindhoven, previously on loan)
—	FW	NED	Milan Smit (to (England) Stoke City, previously on loan)

=== Excelsior ===
In:

No.	Pos.	Nation	Player
2	DF	GER	Eric da Silva Moreira (on loan from (England) Nottingham Forest)
6	MF	NED	Daniël van Vianen (from Dordrecht)
7	FW	NED	Aymen Sliti (on loan from Feyenoord)
9	FW	ESP	Mario Domínguez (on loan from (Spain) Valencia)
11	MF	IRI	Alireza Jahanbakhsh (from (Belgium) Dender)
12	DF	AUS	Kasey Bos (on loan from (Germany) Mainz 05)
14	DF	NED	Jan Plug (on loan from Feyenoord, previously on loan at Dordrecht)
16	GK	GBS	Celton Biai (from Dordrecht)
18	MF	AUT	Valentin Sulzbacher (from (Austria) Red Bull Salzburg)
19	FW	NED	David Garden (from Quick Boys)
21	MF	CPV	Ilano Silva Timas (from MVV)
22	DF	GER	Osman Turay (from (Germany) Bayer Leverkusen youth)
23	MF	SWE	Yacqub Finey (from (Sweden) GIF Sundsvall)
25	DF	JAM	Marlon van de Wetering (from FC Eindhoven)
30	FW	ISL	Ágúst Orri Þorsteinsson (from (Iceland) Breiðablik)

Out:

No.	Pos.	Nation	Player
2	DF	NED	Ilias Bronkhorst (to (England) Huddersfield Town)
5	DF	NED	Stan Henderikx (on loan to Dordrecht)
6	MF	SWE	Adam Carlén (to (Czech Republic) Artis Brno)
7	FW	SWE	Emil Hansson (to (Spain) Real Zaragoza)
8	MF	NED	Mathijs Tielemans (to (Denmark) AaB)
9	FW	POL	Szymon Włodarczyk (loan return to (Austria) Sturm Graz)
11	FW	NED	Gyan de Regt (to (Germany) Holstein Kiel)
12	DF	BFA	Arthur Zagré (to Utrecht)
14	DF	NED	Lewis Schouten (loan return to AZ)
16	GK	NED	Calvin Raatsie (to Dordrecht)
22	DF	NED	Hamdi Akujobi (free agent)
26	MF	IDN	Miliano Jonathans (loan return to Utrecht)
29	FW	NED	Mike van Duinen (to Katwijk)
30	FW	NED	Derensili Sanches Fernandes (to (England) Huddersfield Town)
33	FW	NED	Jerolldino Bergraaf (on loan to Jong AZ)
—	DF	BEL	Nolan Martens (to De Graafschap, previously on loan)

=== Telstar ===
In:

No.	Pos.	Nation	Player
4	DF	FRA	Abdelnour Soualhia (on loan from AZ)
5	DF	NED	Prince Aning (from (Germany) Borussia Dortmund II)
6	MF	CUW	Isaiah Ahmed (from Heerenveen youth)
7	FW	POR	Rui Mendes (from Groningen)
8	FW	TUR	Emirhan Demircan (on loan from Utrecht)
11	FW	ISL	Nökkvi Þeyr Þórisson (reloan from Sparta Rotterdam)
14	MF	NED	Harrie Kuster (from Twente, previously on loan at RKC Waalwijk)
16	DF	NED	Sem Valk (from Dordrecht)
18	DF	NED	Gabi Caschili (free agent)
19	MF	NED	Fabiano Rust (from Feyenoord youth)
21	FW	NED	Fofin Turay (from Groningen)
23	MF	NED	Noach Shenkman (from AFC Amsterdam)
42	DF	CUW	Ar'jany Martha (on loan from (England) Rotherham United)
43	DF	BEL	Marvin Peersman (from Groningen)

Out:

No.	Pos.	Nation	Player
4	DF	NED	Guus Offerhaus (to Utrecht)
6	DF	NED	Danny Bakker (to (South Korea) Anyang)
7	FW	NED	Soufiane Hetli (to (Morocco) Wydad)
11	DF	CUW	Tyrese Noslin (to (England) Barnsley)
13	GK	CUW	Tyrick Bodak (to Vitesse)
14	DF	NED	Neville Ogidi Nwankwo (loan return to Utrecht)
15	DF	NED	Adil Lechkar (to Dordrecht)
16	MF	NED	Dylan Mertens (to (Azerbaijan) Shafa)
21	DF	NED	Devon Koswal (to (Norway) Sandefjord)
23	MF	NED	Cedric Hatenboer (loan return to (Belgium) Anderlecht)
29	DF	SUR	Dion Malone (retired)
30	FW	NED	Kay Tejan (to (Malaysia) Selangor)
37	FW	NED	Sem van Duijn (loan return to AZ)
39	MF	NED	Jochem Ritmeester van de Kamp (loan return to Almere City)

=== PEC Zwolle ===
In:

No.	Pos.	Nation	Player
4	DF	NED	Tijs Velthuis (from Sparta Rotterdam, previously on loan)
6	DF	GER	Jan Bürger (from (Germany) VfL Wolfsburg)
8	MF	DEN	Tobias Sommer (from (Denmark) Sønderjyske)
9	FW	DEN	Elias Sørensen (from (Norway) Vålerenga)
16	GK	NED	Tom de Graaff (from Utrecht, previously on loan)
17	FW	NED	Sydney van Hooijdonk (on loan from (Portugal) Estrela da Amadora)
22	FW	GUI	Ibrahim Cissoko (from (France) Toulouse, previously on loan at (England) Bolton Wanderers)
24	DF	NED	Nick Viergever (from Utrecht)
25	MF	NED	Thijs Oosting (from Groningen, previously on loan)
50	MF	BUL	Filip Krastev (on loan from (Belgium) Lommel, previously on loan at (Turkey) Göztepe)

Out:

No.	Pos.	Nation	Player
4	DF	IRL	Anselmo García MacNulty (to (Germany) 1. FC Magdeburg)
6	DF	NED	Tristan Gooijer (loan return to Jong Ajax)
7	MF	ENG	Shola Shoretire (loan return to (Greece) PAOK)
8	MF	NED	Zico Buurmeester (loan return to AZ)
19	MF	POL	Jan Faberski (loan return to Jong Ajax)
21	MF	NED	Samir Lagsir (retired)
22	FW	NED	Kaj de Rooij (to (Spain) Real Valladolid)
29	FW	NED	Thomas Buitink (to Sparta Nijkerk)
35	MF	CPV	Jamiro Monteiro (to NEC)

=== ADO Den Haag ===
In:

No.	Pos.	Nation	Player
2	DF	NED	Othniël Raterink (on loan from (Italy) Cagliari)
5	DF	DEN	Jonas Jensen-Abbew (from (Denmark) AGF)
8	MF	CZE	Jan Žambůrek (from Heracles Almelo)
22	DF	GER	Lasse Wilhelm (from (Germany) 1. FC Saarbrücken)
23	GK	GER	Niclas Thiede (from (Germany) VfL Bochum)
24	FW	ESP	Álex Pozo (free agent)
33	MF	CZE	Matěj Šín (on loan from AZ)
46	FW	CZE	Yannick Eduardo (on loan from (Germany) TSG Hoffenheim)
77	FW	HUN	Donát Bárány (from (Hungary) Debrecen)

Out:

No.	Pos.	Nation	Player
2	DF	NED	Steven van der Sloot (to (Germany) Fortuna Düsseldorf)
5	DF	NED	Mees Kreekels (free agent)
8	MF	NED	Jari Vlak (to (Spain) Castellón)
9	FW	NOR	Bryan Fiabema (loan return to (Poland) Lech Poznań)
20	MF	NED	Lorenzo Maasland (to (Sweden) Karlstad)
24	GK	BEL	Antoine Lejoly (to (Belgium) Eupen)
30	MF	NED	Joey Brandt (free agent)
31	DF	NED	Devin Payne (free agent)
45	DF	FIN	Diogo Tomás (to (Sweden) AIK)
—	DF	FIN	Taneli Hämäläinen (to (Finland) KuPS, previously on loan)

=== Cambuur ===
In:

No.	Pos.	Nation	Player
2	DF	ITA	Devid Eugene Bouah (from (Italy) Carrarese)
5	MF	BEL	Wout Asselman (on loan from (Belgium) Gent)
7	FW	MAR	Sami Bouhoudane (from Jong PSV)
9	FW	NED	Skye Vink (from Jong Ajax)
10	MF	MAR	Rafik El Arguioui (on loan from Utrecht)
11	FW	FRA	Ilyes Hamache (from (Germany) Schalke 04, previously on loan at (France) Amiens)
14	DF	NED	Billy van Duijl (on loan from AZ)
22	GK	GER	Luca Plogmann (from Go Ahead Eagles)
23	DF	NED	Lucas Jetten (from Jong Ajax)
28	DF	FRA	Morgan Costarelli (from (France) Lille)
30	FW	GER	Jason Ceka (on loan from (Germany) SV Elversberg, previously on loan at (Germany) Dynamo Dresden)
33	MF	BEL	Mathieu Maertens (from (Belgium) OH Leuven)
—	DF	NED	Ryan van de Pavert (on loan from Jong Ajax)

Out:

No.	Pos.	Nation	Player
2	DF	MAR	Diyae Jermoumi (free agent)
7	FW	NED	Remco Balk (to (Indonesia) Bali United)
9	FW	NED	Kian Visser (to (Finland) TPS)
10	MF	NED	Mark Diemers (free agent)
14	FW	BOE	Jort van der Sande (to (Indonesia) Bali United)
18	MF	GER	Tony Rölke (free agent)
22	DF	FIN	Tomas Galvez (loan return to (England) Manchester City)
24	DF	NED	Toni Jonker (to VV Noordbergum)
25	MF	NED	Bram Marsman (to Roda JC)
26	FW	FRA	Ichem Ferrah (loan return to (France) Lille)
—	DF	NED	Ryan van de Pavert (loan return to Jong Ajax)

=== Willem II ===
In:

No.	Pos.	Nation	Player
3	DF	NED	Finn Stam (from Jong AZ, previously on loan)
5	DF	NED	Hidde ter Avest (from (England) Oxford United)
6	MF	NED	Calvin Twigt (from Go Ahead Eagles, previously on loan)
7	FW	NED	Jaden Slory (on loan from Feyenoord, previously on loan at Go Ahead Eagles)
8	MF	NED	Kasper Boogaard (on loan from AZ)
17	FW	DEN	Chido Obi (on loan from (England) Manchester United)
20	MF	NED	Thijs Muller (from FC Eindhoven)
23	DF	NED	Maxim Dekker (from AZ)
26	GK	BEL	Maxime Delanghe (on loan from (Belgium) Cercle Brugge)
32	MF	NED	Vito van Crooij (from NEC, previously on loan at Sparta Rotterdam)
50	FW	NED	Eser Gürbüz (on loan from Heerenveen)
52	MF	NED	Tonny Vilhena (from (Greece) Panathinaikos)
83	DF	BEL	Mats Lemmens (from (Belgium) RWDM Brussels)

Out:

No.	Pos.	Nation	Player
6	MF	NED	Gijs Besselink (loan return to Twente)
7	FW	NED	Nick Doodeman (to Volendam)
17	FW	GER	Samuel Bamba (loan return to (Germany) VfL Bochum)
20	MF	NED	Mounir El Allouchi (free agent)
23	FW	DEN	Lasse Abildgaard (on loan to FC Eindhoven)
27	MF	NED	Dani Mathieu (free agent)
30	DF	AUT	Raffael Behounek (to (Austria) Wolfsberger)
47	FW	NED	Siegert Baartmans (on loan to FC Eindhoven)
—	MF	BEL	Boris Lambert (to (Belgium) Kortrijk, previously on loan)
—	FW	GER	Emilio Kehrer (to (Switzerland) Winterthur, previously on loan at (Germany) FC Ingolstadt)

== See also ==
- 2026–27 Eredivisie
