= 2026–27 SC Telstar season =

Dutch football club season

SC Telstar
2026–27 season
- Chairman: Lex de Jager
- Head coach: Henk Brugge
- Stadium: BUKO Stadion
- Eredivisie: 16th
- KNVB Cup: 1st round
Home colours	Away colours

The 2026–27 season is the 64th season in the existence of Sportclub Telstar and their second consecutive season in the Eredivisie. In addition to the domestic league

The club also participated in the KNVB Cup, where they are eliminated in the first round following a 2–0 defeat to Almere City FC.

== Transfers ==
=== In ===
Pos.	Player	Transferred from	Fee	Date	Source
DF	(France) Abdelnour Soualhia	(Netherlands) AZ	Loan	2 July 2026	
DF	(Belgium) Marvin Peersman	(Netherlands) FC Groningen	Free	6 July 2026	

=== Out ===
Pos.	Player	Transferred to	Fee	Date	Source
DF	(Netherlands) Guus Offerhaus	(Netherlands) Utrecht	Free	1 July 2026	
DF	(Netherlands) Devon Koswal	(Norway) Sandefjord	Free	1 July 2026	
DF	(Suriname) Dion Malone	Retiring		1 July 2026	

== Pre-season and friendlies ==
27 June 2026 Friendly	Telstar (Netherlands)	v	(Netherlands) Helmond Sport
14:00

4 July 2026 Friendly	Almere City (Netherlands)	2–1	(Netherlands) Telstar
15:00	34'; 71'		32'

== Competitions ==
=== Overall record ===
Competition	First match	Last match	Starting round	Final position	Record							
Competition	First match	Last match	Starting round	Final position	Pld	W	D	L	GF	GA	GD	Win %
Eredivisie	8 August 2026	23 May 2027	Week 1		12	2	4	6	18	25	−7	16.67
KNVB Cup	27 October 2026	27 October 2026	1st round	1st round	1	0	0	1	0	2	−2	0.00
Total					13	2	4	7	18	27	−9	15.38

Last updated: 9 November 2026
Source: WorldFootball

=== Eredivisie ===
==== League table ====
Pos	Team	Pld	W	D	L	GF	GA	GD	Pts	Qualification or relegation
14	Utrecht	12	3	3	6	21	34	−13	12	
15	Excelsior	12	3	2	7	16	29	−13	11	
16	Telstar	12	2	4	6	18	25	−7	10	Qualification for the Relegation play-off
17	ADO Den Haag	12	2	3	7	16	25	−9	9	Relegation to Eerste Divisie
18	Willem II	12	0	3	9	11	40	−29	3	Relegation to Eerste Divisie

Updated to match(es) played on 8 November 2026. Source: Eredivisie
Rules for classification: 1) Points; 2) Less loss points; 3) Goal difference; 4) Goals scored; 5) Head-to-head points; 6) Head-to-head goal difference; 7) Head-to-head away goals scored; 9) Play-off if relevant for deciding champion, relegation or participating in a European league, otherwise by draw. 9) Penalty shoot-out (only after a play-off)

==== Results summary ====
Overall								Home						Away					
Pld	W	D	L	GF	GA	GD	Pts	W	D	L	GF	GA	GD	W	D	L	GF	GA	GD
12	2	4	6	18	25	−7	10	1	2	3	12	17	−5	1	2	3	6	8	−2

Last updated: 11 October 2026.
Source: ESPN

==== Results by round ====
Round	1	2	3	4	5	6	7	8	9	10	11	12	13	14	15	16	17	18	19	20	21	22	23	24	25	26	27	28	29	30	31	32	33	34
Ground	A	H	H	H	A	A	A	H	H	A	H	A	H	A	H	A	A																	
Result	W	L	L	D	L	D	L	D	L	L	W	D																						
Position	6	13									16	16																						
Points	3	3	3	4	4	5	5	6	6	6	9	10																						

Updated to match(es) played on 7 November 2026. Source: ESPN
A = Away; H = Home; W = Win; D = Draw; L = Loss; P = Postponed

=== Matches ===
The league fixtures were released on 16 June 2026. All times are local, CET (UTC+1) or CEST (UTC+2), as applicable.

Win Draw Loss Fixtures

==== 1st half ====
8 August 2026 1st week	NEC	1–2	SC Telstar	Nijmegen
16:30	Sierhuis 82'; Pereira (yellow card) 57'; Hansen-Aarøen (yellow card) 68'	Report	Brouwer 1'; Mendes 24'; Ahmad (yellow card) 74'; Koeman (yellow card) 78'	Stadium: Goffertstadion; Attendance: 12,650; Referee: Martijn Vos

14 August 2026 2nd week	SC Telstar	1–3	Sparta Rotterdam	Velsen-Zuid
20:00	Soualhia (yellow card) 55' (goal) 90+1'	Report	Young 6'; Þórisson 53'; Martes (yellow card) 56'; Van Cruijsen 90+7'	Stadium: BUKO Stadion; Referee: Ingmar Oostrom

30 August 2026 3rd week	SC Telstar	0–4	Ajax	Velsen-Zuid
16:45		Report	Klaassen 37'; Berghuis 56'; Arokodare 60'; Marcos Leonardo 78'	Stadium: BUKO Stadion; Attendance: 5,146; Referee: Dennis Higler

6 September 2026 4th week	SC Telstar	2–2	Cambuur	Velsen-Zuid
14:30	Þórisson (red card) 22'; Mendes (yellow card) 28'; Koeman Jr. 63' (pen.), 90+11' (pen.) (yellow card) 90+12'; Soualhia (yellow card) 85'	Report	Baouf (yellow card) 28'; El Arguioui 53' (yellow card) 90+7'; Binder 60'; Mulders (yellow card) 78'; Bouhoudane (yellow card) 90'	Stadium: BUKO Stadion; Attendance: 5,002; Referee: Joey Kooij

9 September 2026 5th week	Twente	1–0	SC Telstar	Enschede
18:45	Taha (yellow card) 23'; Ørjasæter 65'; Weghorst (penalty missed) 81'	Report	Þórisson (yellow card) 46'; Peersman (yellow card) 55'; Valk (yellow card) 62'	Stadium: De Grolsch Veste; Referee: Richard Martens

13 September 2026 6th week	Heerenveen	0–0	SC Telstar	Heerenveen
14:30	Zagaritis (yellow card) 69'; Farji (yellow card) 83'	Report		Stadium: Abe Lenstra Stadion; Attendance: 21,764; Referee: Serdar Gözübüyük

20 September 2026 7th week	AZ	1–0	SC Telstar	Alkmaar
14:30	Meerdink 19'; Goes (yellow card) 88'	Report	Alders (yellow card) 41'	Stadium: AFAS Stadion; Attendance: 18,459; Referee: Sander van der Eijk

11 October 2026 8th week	SC Telstar	2–2	ADO Den Haag	Velsen-Zuid
14:30	Owusu 14' 37'; Seedorf (yellow card) 16'; Soualhia (yellow card) 85'	Report	Hokke (red card) 13'; Eduardo 16'; Rottier 25'; Pozo (yellow card) 40'	Stadium: BUKO Stadion; Attendance: 4,850; Referee: Erwin Blank

17 October 2026 9th week	SC Telstar	3–4	Feyenoord	Velsen-Zuid
20:00	Tyrone Owusu 30'; Patrick Brouwer 37'; Noach Shenkman 69'	Report	Gaoussou Diarra 1'; Nacho Ferri 21'; Sem Steijn 32' 57' (pen.)	Stadium: BUKO Stadion; Attendance: 5,463

23 October 2026 10th week	Go Ahead Eagles	3–2	SC Telstar	Deventer
20:00	Søren Tengstedt 7' 33'; Evert Linthorst 67'	Report	Tyrone Owusu 48'; Sem Valk 90+2'	Stadium: De Adelaarshorst; Attendance: 9,283

1 November 2026 11th week	SC Telstar	4–2	FC Utrecht	Velsen-Zuid
14:30	Tyrone Owusu 8'; Abdelnour Soualhia 25'; Nökkvi Þeyr Þórisson 44'; Ar'jany Martha 59'	Report	Ángel Alarcón 42'; Yoann Cathline 46'	Stadium: BUKO Stadion; Attendance: 4,750

7 November 2026 12th week	Fortuna Sittard	2–2	SC Telstar	Sittard
16:30	Mohamed Ihattaren 15' (pen.); Sem Valk 43' (o.g.)	Report	Abdelnour Soualhia 45'; Patrick Brouwer 45+2'	Stadium: Fortuna Sittard Stadion; Attendance: 11,187

=== KNVB Cup ===
27 October 2026 1st round	SC Telstar	0–2	Almere City FC	Velsen-Zuid
20:00		Report	Teun Bijleveld 61'; Jochem Ritmeester van de Kamp 80'	Stadium: BUKO Stadion
