= Bram Marsman =

Dutch footballer (born 2003)

Personal information
- Date of birth: 29 January 2003 (age 23)
- Place of birth: Vroomshoop, Netherlands
- Height: 1.73 m (5 ft 8 in)
- Position: Left-back

Team information
- Current team: Roda JC

Youth career
- –2013: Vroomshoopse Boys
- 2013–2022: Twente/Heracles
- 2022–2024: Cambuur

Senior career*
Years	Team	Apps	(Gls)
2024–2026	Cambuur	32	(2)
2026–	Roda JC	0	(0)

International career
2019	Netherlands U16	2	(0)
- * Club domestic league appearances and goals as of 28 April 2026

Bram Marsman (born 29 January 2003) is a Dutch professional footballer who plays as a left-back for Dutch Eerste Divisie club Roda JC.

== Club career ==
=== Youth career ===
Marsman grew up in Vroomshoop, Overijssel, and played youth football for local club Vroomshoopse Boys before joining the FC Twente/Heracles joint academy in 2013. During his time in the academy, he was used primarily as a winger and trained with the first-team squads at both Heracles Almelo and Twente in the 2020–21 season. In June 2019, regional daily Tubantia reported that Twente succeeded in keeping Marsman amid interest from Wolverhampton Wanderers. He signed a two-year academy contract with an option year in June 2021.

=== Cambuur ===
In 2022, Marsman joined Cambuur's youth setup. He made his senior debut for Cambuur on 26 April 2024 in the Eerste Divisie against Dordrecht, coming on at half-time and providing an assist for Milan Smit within four minutes.

On 15 May 2024, Marsman signed his first professional contract with Cambuur, keeping him at the club until the summer of 2026 with an option for a further year. He made eight appearances in the 2024–25 season, mostly as a substitute, and continued in that role early in the 2025–26 campaign, featuring in home and away victories over TOP Oss and Jong AZ in August 2025. On 11 October, he scored his first senior goal, opening the scoring in a 2–0 home win against De Graafschap—his first start for the club, coming in place of regular left-back Tomas Galvez, who was on international duty with the Finland under-21 team.

=== Roda JC ===
On 24 June 2026, Marsman signed a two-year contract with the option of a further season with Eerste Divisie club Roda JC.

== International career ==
In January 2019, Marsman was called up to the Netherlands under-16 squad. He made his debut on 9 February, starting in a 1–0 UEFA Under-16 Development Tournament defeat to Portugal U16 in Vila Real de Santo António.

== Style of play ==
A left-footed full-back, Marsman has been described by Cambuur's technical manager Lars Lambooij as having a "modern, energetic style" that fitted the club's profile for the position.

== Career statistics ==
As of match played 28 April 2026

Appearances and goals by club, season and competition
Club	Season	League			Cup		Other		Total	
Club	Season	Division	Apps	Goals	Apps	Goals	Apps	Goals	Apps	Goals
Cambuur	2023–24	Eerste Divisie	1	0	—		—		1	0
Cambuur	2024–25	Eerste Divisie	7	0	1	0	—		8	0
Cambuur	2025–26	Eerste Divisie	24	2	—		—		24	2
Career total			32	2	1	0	0	0	33	2
