= Oscar Sjöstrand =

Swedish footballer (born 2004)

Personal information
- Full name: Oscar Love Sjöstrand
- Date of birth: 8 November 2004 (age 21)
- Place of birth: Lännersta, Nacka Municipality, Sweden
- Position: Winger

Team information
- Current team: Malmö FF
- Number: 24

Youth career
- 2015–2019: Nacka FC

Senior career*
Years	Team	Apps	(Gls)
2019–2020	Nacka United	11	(2)
2021–2022	Boo FF	21	(7)
2023	Djurgårdens IF	0	(0)
2024	Sollentuna FK	11	(2)
2024–2025	Sandvikens IF	27	(3)
2025–2026	Cambuur	32	(10)
2026–	Malmö FF	13	(1)

International career^{‡}
2026	Sweden U21	2	(0)
- * Club domestic league appearances and goals as of 12 July 2026 ‡ National team caps and goals as of 17:49, 1 April 2026 (UTC)

Oscar Love Sjöstrand (born 8 November 2004) is a Swedish professional footballer who plays as a winger for Allsvenskan club Malmö FF.

== Club career ==
Sjöstrand came through the academy of Nacka FC, spending seven years with the club before moving to Djurgården via Boo FF, where he scored in the club's under-19 Ligacupen final win over Kalmar FF in May 2023. He joined third-tier Ettan side Sollentuna FK in February 2024 and scored twice in 11 league matches during the spring before moving up a division.

In July 2024, Sjöstrand moved to Superettan club Sandvikens IF. He became a regular starter, registering two goals and three assists in 14 league matches during the first half of the 2025 season. Across his Sandviken spell he made 27 competitive appearances with three goals and five assists.

On 11 July 2025, Sjöstrand signed a three-year contract with Dutch club Cambuur, to run through summer 2028 with a club option for a further year, and was assigned squad number 11. He made his league debut in the second-tier Eerste Divisie in August 2025 and scored his first goal for the club on 15 August in a 1–0 home win over TOP Oss.

== Style of play ==
Upon signing Sjöstrand in 2025, Cambuur's technical manager Lars Lambooij highlighted Sjöstrand's pace, threat in behind and one-on-one dribbling as attributes that added specific weapons to the squad.

== Career statistics ==
As of match played 12 July 2026

Appearances and goals by club, season and competition
Club	Season	League			Cup		Other		Total	
Club	Season	Division	Apps	Goals	Apps	Goals	Apps	Goals	Apps	Goals
Sollentuna FK	2024	Ettan Norra	15	2	1	2	—		16	4
Sandvikens IF	2024	Superettan	13	1	0	0	—		13	1
Sandvikens IF	2025	Superettan	14	2	4	1	—		18	3
Sandvikens IF	Total		27	3	4	1	—		31	4
Cambuur	2025–26	Eerste Divisie	32	10	1	0	—		33	10
Malmö FF	2026	Allsvenskan	12	0	—		0	0	12	0
Career total			86	15	6	3	0	0	92	18
