= Jan Bens =

Dutch footballer (1921–2012)

Personal information
- Date of birth: 15 April 1921
- Place of birth: Rotterdam, Netherlands
- Date of death: 12 May 2012 (aged 91)
- Place of death: Rotterdam, Netherlands
- Position: Winger

Youth career
- 1933–1938: Feyenoord

Senior career*
Years	Team	Apps	(Gls)
1940–1947	Feyenoord	76	(25)
1947–1955	EBOH		

Managerial career
- 1962–1964: DFC
- 1964–1966: Cambuur
- 1968–1970: Cambuur
- 1970–1972: SVV
- * Club domestic league appearances and goals

Jan Bens (15 April 1921 – 12 May 2012) was a Dutch professional football player and coach; he was also an amateur boxer and trainer.

== Football career ==
=== Playing career ===
Born in Rotterdam, Bens joined hometown club Feyenoord at the age of 12 and made his senior debut at the age of 17. In a match against Ajax on 6 December 1942, Bens became the first player ever to be sent off in De Klassieker, after punching Ajax goalkeeper Gerrit Keizer. A winger, scored 25 goals in 76 first team games for Feyenoord. In 2007, he was the last surviving Feyenoord player from before World War II.

He left Feyenoord for EBOH in 1947.

=== Managerial career ===
After retiring as a player, Bens became a manager and coach, working in both the Netherlands and Australia with Go Ahead Eagles, EBOH, DFC, SC Cambuur, Ringwood City Wilhelmina and SVV.

== Boxing career ==
Bens had a career as an amateur boxer, alongside his football career. He also trained professional boxer Lolle van Houten.

== Later life and death ==
Bens died on 12 May 2012, at the age of 91.
