= Ichem Ferrah =

Algérie Batna footballer (born 2005)

Personal information
- Date of birth: 23 September 2005 (age 21)
- Place of birth: Tourcoing, France
- Height: 1.71 m (5 ft 7 in)
- Position: Winger

Team information
- Current team: Pisa
- Number: 11

Youth career
- 2012–2016: UJS Cheminot Tourcoing
- 2016–2018: CS Neuville
- 2018–2023: Lille

Senior career*
Years	Team	Apps	(Gls)
2022–2026	Lille B	28	(13)
2023–2026	Lille	1	(0)
2024–2025	→ Rouen (loan)	24	(3)
2025–2026	→ Cambuur (loan)	35	(12)
2026–	Pisa	1	(0)
- * Club domestic league appearances and goals as of 23 August 2026

Ichem Ferrah (born 23 September 2005) is a French professional footballer who plays as a winger for Serie B club Pisa.

== Career ==
Ferrah came through the youth ranks at UJS Cheminot Tourcoing and Neuville before joining Lille's academy in 2018. In the 2022–23 season he was promoted to Lille's under-19, followed by their reserves in the Championnat National 3. On 28 December 2022 he made his first appearance on the bench of the senior team for a Ligue 1 match against Clermont. He signed his first professional contract with Lille on 6 January 2023, running to 2026.

Ferrah made his senior debut as an 88th-minute substitute in a 2–0 Ligue 1 win over Metz on 3 December 2023, and appeared later that season in the UEFA Europa Conference League round of 16, coming off the bench in Lille's 3–0 first-leg victory at SK Sturm Graz.

On 26 August 2024, Ferrah joined Rouen of the Championnat National on a season-long loan. He scored three goals in 26 total appearances.

On 21 August 2025, he extended his contract with Lille to 2027 and moved on loan to Eerste Divisie club Cambuur for the 2025–26 season.

On 7 August 2026, Ferrah joined Serie B side Pisa on a five-year contract for €2.5 million.

== Personal life ==
Ferrah holds both French and Algerian nationalities.

== Career statistics ==
As of match played 16 January 2026

Appearances and goals by club, season and competition
Club	Season	League			Cup		Europe		Total	
Club	Season	Division	Apps	Goals	Apps	Goals	Apps	Goals	Apps	Goals
Lille II	2021–22	National 3	1	0	—		—		1	0
Lille II	2022–23	National 3	18	5	—		—		18	5
Lille II	2023–24	National 3	24	15	—		—		24	15
Lille II	Total		43	20	—		—		43	20
Lille	2023–24	Ligue 1	1	0	0	0	1 (Note: Appearances in UEFA Europa Conference League)	0	2	0
Rouen (loan)	2024–25	National	24	3	2	0	—		26	3
Cambuur (loan)	2025–26	Eerste Divisie	19	4	1	0	—		20	4
Career total			87	27	3	0	1	0	91	27
