= Iwan Henstra =

Dutch footballer (born 2006)

Personal information
- Date of birth: 10 October 2006 (age 20)
- Place of birth: Surhuisterveen, Netherlands
- Height: 1.87 m (6 ft 2 in)
- Position: Winger

Team information
- Current team: Cambuur
- Number: 29

Youth career
- –2016: SJO Feanstars
- 2016–2017: Drachtster Boys
- 2017–2021: Groningen
- 2021–2023: SJO Feanstars
- 2023: Cambuur

Senior career*
| Years | Team | Apps | (Gls) |
| 2023– | Cambuur | 32 | (6) |
- * Club domestic league appearances and goals as of 13:44, 15 September 2026 (UTC)

Iwan Henstra (born 10 October 2006) is a Dutch professional footballer who plays as a winger for Eredivisie club Cambuur.

== Career ==
Henstra played in the youth teams of RJO Feanstars and Drachtster Boys before joining the academy of FC Groningen in 2017. After four years, he returned to RJO Feanstars before joining Cambuur in 2023. In September of that year, he signed his first professional contract with the club, which ran until 2025 and included an option for an additional season.

Henstra made his senior debut on 29 October 2023 in an Eerste Divisie match against his former side Groningen, coming on as a substitute in the second half under head coach Henk de Jong as Cambuur secured a 2–1 home victory. Later that season, he also appeared in the KNVB Cup. During the 2024–25 season, Henstra made one official first-team appearance. In the summer of 2025, FC Utrecht expressed interest in signing him for their reserve side competing in the Dutch second tier, but he chose to remain at Cambuur. That summer, his contract was renegotiated and extended until 2028.

Henstra's involvement with the first team increased at the start of the 2025–26 season. He scored his first professional goal on 17 October 2025 in a league match against Almere City, equalising after coming on as a substitute.

== Career statistics ==
As of match played 12 September 2026

Appearances and goals by club, season and competition
| Club | Season | League | | | National cup | | Other | | Total | |
| Club | Season | Division | Apps | Goals | Apps | Goals | Apps | Goals | Apps | Goals |
|---|---|---|---|---|---|---|---|---|---|---|
| Cambuur | 2023–24 | Eerste Divisie | 1 | 0 | 1 | 0 | — | | 2 | 0 |
| Cambuur | 2024–25 | Eerste Divisie | 0 | 0 | 0 | 0 | 1 (Note: Appearance in Eredivisie promotion/relegation playoffs) | 0 | 1 | 0 |
| Cambuur | 2025–26 | Eerste Divisie | 26 | 5 | 0 | 0 | — | | 26 | 5 |
| Cambuur | 2026–27 | Eredivisie | 5 | 1 | 0 | 0 | — | | 5 | 1 |
| Career total | | | 32 | 6 | 1 | 0 | 1 | 0 | 34 | 6 |
