= Tony Rölke =

German footballer (born 2003)

Personal information
- Date of birth: 22 January 2003 (age 23)
- Place of birth: Berlin, Germany
- Height: 1.88 m (6 ft 2 in)
- Positions: Attacking midfielder; striker

Youth career
- –2015: FC Stern Marienfelde
- 2015–2022: Hertha BSC

Senior career*
Years	Team	Apps	(Gls)
2022–2024	Hertha BSC II	55	(8)
2023–2024	Hertha BSC	2	(0)
2024–2026	Cambuur	65	(12)

International career
2019	Germany U17	1	(0)
2020	Germany U18	2	(2)
- * Club domestic league appearances and goals as of 28 April 2026

Tony Rölke (born 22 January 2003) is a German professional footballer who plays as an attacking midfielder or striker.

== Club career ==
=== Hertha BSC ===
Born in Berlin, Rölke played youth football for FC Stern Marienfelde before joining the Hertha BSC academy in 2015. He progressed through the under-17 and under-19 sides and moved into Hertha BSC II in 2022, featuring in the Regionalliga Nordost.

Rölke made his senior debut for Hertha's first team on 27 May 2023, coming on in the 71st minute in a 2–1 Bundesliga away win against VfL Wolfsburg on the final day of the season. He was also part of matchday squads during the subsequent 2. Bundesliga campaign and made an additional league appearance in 2023–24.

=== Cambuur ===
On 2 July 2024, Rölke joined Dutch Eerste Divisie side Cambuur on a free transfer, signing a two-year contract with an option for a further season. He made his league debut on 23 August 2024 in a 1–0 defeat away to TOP Oss. Rölke scored his first Cambuur goal on 17 December 2024 in the KNVB Cup, opening the scoring in a 4–1 defeat at RKC Waalwijk. He went on to establish himself in the first team during 2024–25. On 25 April 2025, Rölke scored his first league goals for Cambuur, netting a brace in a 2–1 home win over Vitesse. In the 2024–25 campaign he made 30 league appearances and scored seven goals, adding two KNVB Cup appearances with one goal.

In the 2025–26 season Rölke moved between the starting eleven and the bench, and was at times deployed as a striker rather than in midfield. He told Omrop Fryslân that he was enjoying his football at the club and felt in good form. Cambuur won promotion to the Eredivisie at the end of the season. The club declined to take up the option on his contract, and Rölke left on its expiry. He scored 14 goals in 70 competitive appearances for the club.

== International career ==
Rölke represented Germany at under-17 and under-18 level, earning one U17 cap in 2019 and scoring twice in two appearances for the U18s in 2020.

== Style of play ==
Cambuur's technical manager Lars Lambooij described Rölke as a box-to-box midfielder who adds physicality and running power, while being comfortable on the ball; he predominantly plays as an attacking midfielder and is two-footed.

== Career statistics ==
As of match played 24 April 2026

Appearances and goals by club, season and competition
Club	Season	League			National cup		Other		Total	
Club	Season	Division	Apps	Goals	Apps	Goals	Apps	Goals	Apps	Goals
Hertha BSC II	2022–23	Regionalliga Nordost	30	8	—		—		30	8
Hertha BSC II	2023–24	Regionalliga Nordost	25	0	—		—		25	8
Hertha BSC II	Total		55	8	—		—		55	8
Hertha BSC	2022–23	Bundesliga	1	0	0	0	—		1	0
Hertha BSC	2023–24	2. Bundesliga	1	0	0	0	—		1	0
Hertha BSC	Total		2	0	0	0	—		2	0
Cambuur	2024–25	Eerste Divisie	30	7	2	1	2 (Note: Appearances in Eredivisie promotion/relegation playoffs)	0	34	8
Cambuur	2025–26	Eerste Divisie	35	5	1	1	—		36	6
Cambuur	Total		65	12	3	2	2	0	70	14
Career total			122	20	3	2	2	0	127	22
