= Rik Mulders =

Dutch footballer (born 2000)

Personal information
- Date of birth: 6 August 2000 (age 26)
- Place of birth: 's-Hertogenbosch, Netherlands
- Height: 1.70 m (5 ft 7 in)
- Position: Right-back

Team information
- Current team: Cambuur
- Number: 16

Youth career
- 2009–2018: Den Bosch

Senior career*
Years	Team	Apps	(Gls)
2019–2025	Den Bosch	144	(4)
2025–	Cambuur	30	(0)
- * Club domestic league appearances and goals as of 28 April 2026

Rik Mulders (born 6 August 2000) is a Dutch professional footballer who plays as a right-back for Eredivisie club Cambuur.

== Club career ==
=== FC Den Bosch ===
Mulders came through Den Bosch's academy and featured for Jong FC Den Bosch before moving up to the first team. He made his senior debut on 23 August 2019 in a 1–1 Eerste Divisie draw at home to Eindhoven, coming on in the 73rd minute for Rúben Rodrigues.

He signed his first professional contract in June 2020, to run until 2022, and extended it in May 2022 through 2025. In May 2024, the club opened and prolonged his deal to the summer of 2027, noting that he had converted from midfield to right-back in the senior squad.

On 26 March 2023 he scored his first professional goal, making it 1–1 after seven minutes in a 3–2 defeat away to Heracles Almelo; the goal was assisted by Danny Verbeek.

During the 2024–25 season, Mulders was sidelined for an extended spell with an abdominal injury; local reports noted he underwent surgery in late February 2025 and would be out for weeks. He returned as a substitute on 6 April 2025 in a 2–2 home draw with Eindhoven.

=== Cambuur ===
On 23 July 2025, Mulders joined Cambuur on a three-year contract, leaving Den Bosch after 154 official appearances in all competitions. He made his competitive debut for the club on the first matchday of the 2025–26 season, starting in a 1–0 loss to Dordrecht.

== Career statistics ==
As of match played 15 August 2025

Appearances and goals by club, season and competition
Club	Season	League			KNVB Cup		Other		Total	
Club	Season	Division	Apps	Goals	Apps	Goals	Apps	Goals	Apps	Goals
FC Den Bosch	2019–20	Eerste Divisie	6	0	0	0	—		6	0
FC Den Bosch	2020–21	Eerste Divisie	22	0	1	0	—		23	0
FC Den Bosch	2021–22	Eerste Divisie	30	0	1	0	—		31	0
FC Den Bosch	2022–23	Eerste Divisie	34	1	2	0	—		36	1
FC Den Bosch	2023–24	Eerste Divisie	32	2	1	0	—		33	2
FC Den Bosch	2024–25	Eerste Divisie	20	1	1	0	4 (Note: Appearances in Eredivisie promotion/relegation play-offs)	0	25	1
FC Den Bosch	Total		144	4	6	0	4	0	154	4
Cambuur	2025–26	Eerste Divisie	2	0	0	0	—		2	0
Career total			146	4	5	0	4	0	155	4
