= Nathan Kaninda =

French footballer (born 2004)

Personal information
- Full name: Nathan Charles Kaninda
- Date of birth: 13 June 2004 (age 22)
- Place of birth: Bondy, France
- Height: 1.77 m (5 ft 10 in)
- Position: Right winger

Team information
- Current team: De Graafschap
- Number: 17

Youth career
- –2019: AFC Creil
- 2019–2024: AS Nancy
- 2024: Fortuna Sittard
- 2025–: De Graafschap

Senior career*
Years	Team	Apps	(Gls)
2025–	De Graafschap	4	(0)
- * Club domestic league appearances and goals as of 3 December 2025

Nathan Charles Kaninda (born 13 June 2004) is a French professional footballer who plays as a right winger for Dutch club De Graafschap.

== Career ==
Kaninda was born in Bondy, a suburb of Paris. He played youth football for AFC Creil until 2019, when he joined the youth academy of AS Nancy. After his spell in France, he moved to the Netherlands in early 2024 and joined the under-21 team of Fortuna Sittard.

During the winter break of the 2024–25 season, Kaninda joined De Graafschap, where he mainly played for the club's under-21 side. He scored eight goals in fourteen matches during half a season, after which he signed his first professional contract in July 2025: a one-year deal with an option for an additional year.

On 20 January 2025, Kaninda made his professional debut for De Graafschap in a league match against Jong FC Utrecht, which ended in a 1–1 draw.

== Career statistics ==
Appearances and goals by club, season and competition
Club	Season	League			Cup		Other		Total	
Club	Season	Division	Apps	Goals	Apps	Goals	Apps	Goals	Apps	Goals
De Graafschap	2024–25	Eerste Divisie	1	0	0	0	—		1	0
De Graafschap	2025–26	Eerste Divisie	3	0	1	0	—		4	0
Career total			4	0	1	0	0	0	5	0
