= Noach Shenkman =

Dutch footballer (born 2006)

- Shenkman with Telstar in 2026

Personal information
- Date of birth: 2 October 2006 (age 20)
- Place of birth: Amsterdam, Netherlands
- Position: Midfielder

Team information
- Current team: Telstar
- Number: 23

Youth career
- 2012–2017: AFC
- 2017–2022: Volendam
- 2022–2025: AFC

Senior career*
Years	Team	Apps	(Gls)
2025–2026	AFC	27	(7)
2026–	Telstar	9	(1)
- * Club domestic league appearances and goals as of 11:54, 14 November 2026 (UTC)

Noach Shenkman (born 2 October 2006) is a Dutch professional footballer who plays as a midfielder for Eredivisie club Telstar.

Shenkman came through the youth academies of AFC and Volendam. He made his senior debut for AFC in the Tweede Divisie in August 2025 and joined Telstar the following summer. He made his Eredivisie debut in August 2026.

== Early life and career ==
Shenkman was born on 2 October 2006. He started playing football at the age of five. He began at AFC and moved to the FC Volendam academy in 2017. After five seasons in Volendam, he returned to AFC in 2022.

== Club career ==
=== AFC ===
Shenkman was one of six academy players promoted to AFC's first-team squad for the 2025–26 season, under new head coach Chedric Seedorf, Clarence Seedorf's younger brother. He made his debut on 23 August 2025, coming on in the 88th minute of a 2–0 away win over IJsselmeervogels. On 11 October 2025, he scored the only goal in a 1–0 win away to VV Katwijk. He finished the season with seven goals and two assists in 29 official matches.

=== Telstar ===
On 19 June 2026, Shenkman signed for Eredivisie club Telstar on a contract until mid-2028, with an option for a further year. Technical manager Peter Hofstede described him as a promising signing for the future.

On 8 August 2026, Shenkman made his professional debut on the opening day of the 2026–27 season, replacing Nils Rossen in the 64th minute of a 2–1 win away to NEC. His first start came in a 2–2 home draw with ADO Den Haag on 11 October.

Six days later, Shenkman started again at home to Feyenoord and set up a goal for Tyrone Owusu. In the second half, he headed in a pass from Sem Valk to make it 3–4, his first Eredivisie goal. Telstar could not find an equaliser and lost 4–3. Afterwards, Shenkman said the team had at times played good football.

== Personal life ==
Shenkman studies business administration at the University of Amsterdam. By July 2026, he had completed the second year of his bachelor's degree. He has described playing in the Eredivisie as "a childhood dream".

== Career statistics ==
As of match played 7 November 2026

Appearances and goals by club, season and competition
Club	Season	League			KNVB Cup		Other		Total	
Club	Season	Division	Apps	Goals	Apps	Goals	Apps	Goals	Apps	Goals
AFC	2025–26	Tweede Divisie	27	7	2	0	—		29	7
Telstar	2026–27	Eredivisie	9	1	0	0	—		9	1
Career total			36	8	2	0	0	0	38	8
