= Kooi Stadion =

Football stadium in Leeuwarden, Netherlands

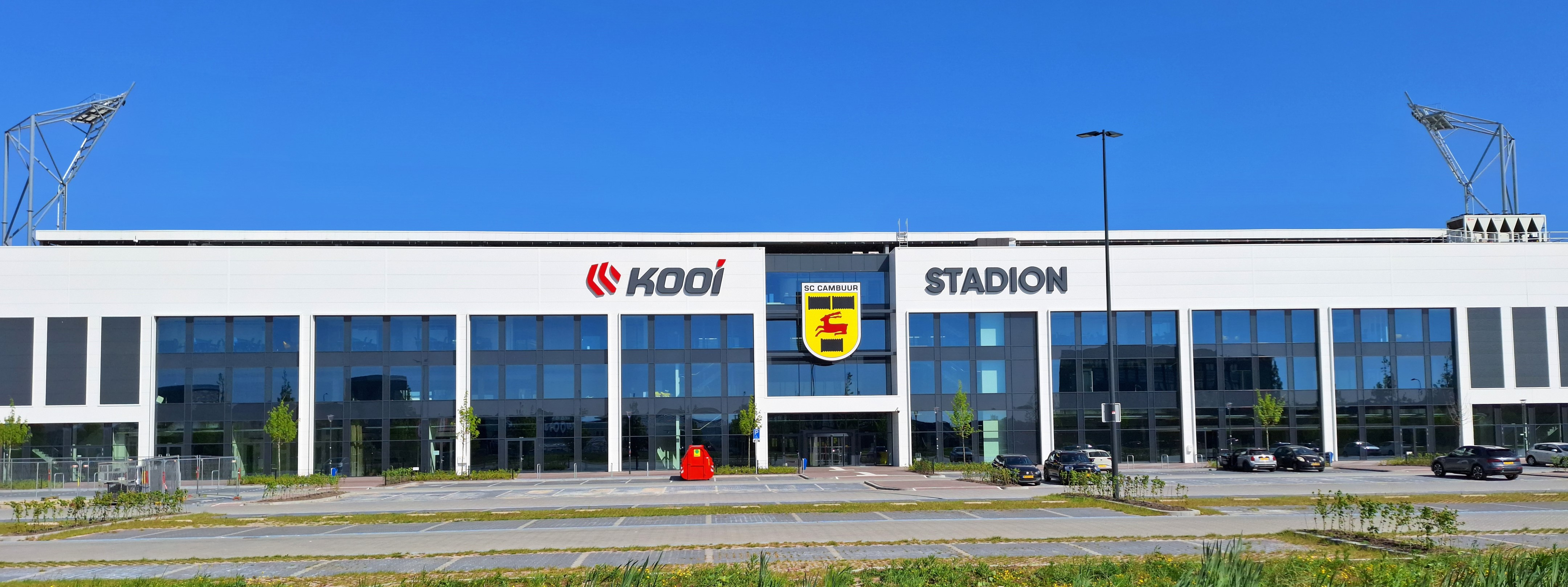
- Interactive map of Kooi Stadion
- Address: Stadionplein 15; Leeuwarden; Netherlands
- Coordinates: 53.2005°N 5.7684°E
- Capacity: 15,000
- Field size: 105 x 68 meters
- Public transit: Qbuzz route 70

Construction
- Opened: 2024

Tenants
- SC Cambuur

Website
- https://cambuur.nl/stadion058/bereikbaarheid/

Kooi Stadion is a football stadium in Leeuwarden, Netherlands. It is home to Eredivisie club SC Cambuur.

The stadium replaces SC Cambuur's previous stadium, Cambuur Stadion.

== History ==
The stadium opened on 18 August 2024 in a 1–0 loss to Helmond Sport.
