= Jorn Berkhout =

Dutch footballer (born 2002)

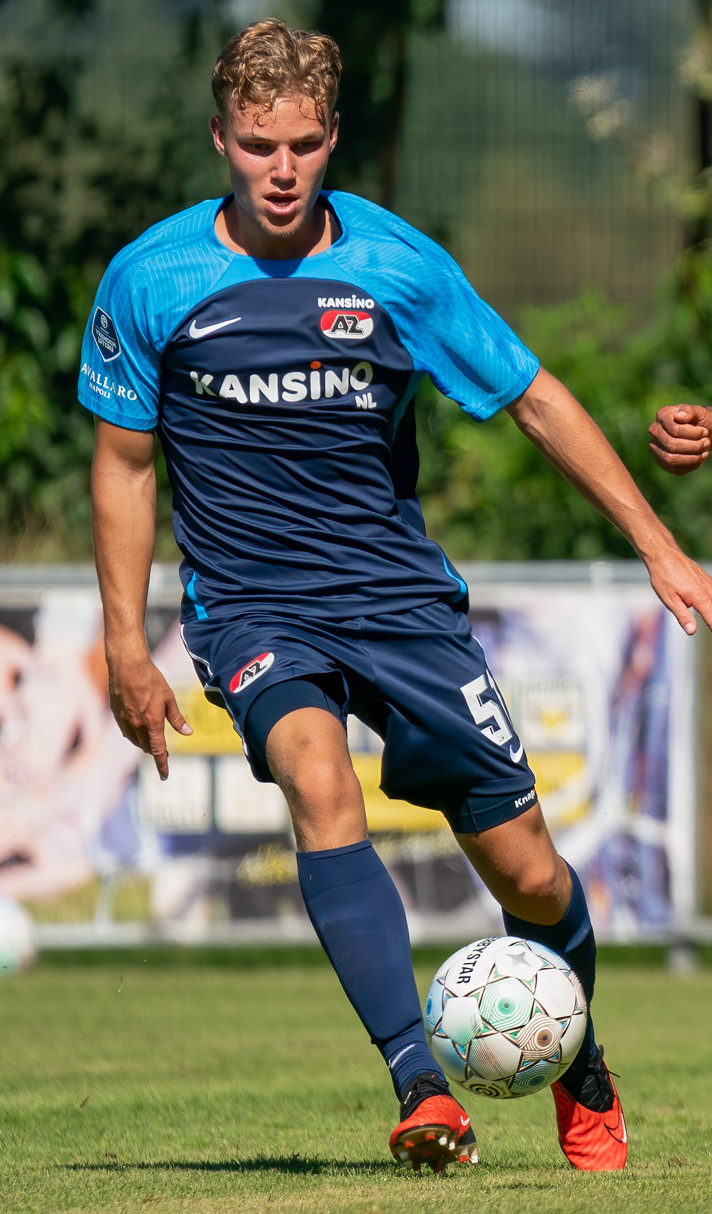
- Berkohout in 2023 with AZ

Personal information
- Date of birth: 18 March 2002 (age 24)
- Place of birth: Heerhugowaard, Netherlands
- Position: Centre-back

Team information
- Current team: Cambuur
- Number: 3

Youth career
- 2013–2020: AZ

Senior career*
Years	Team	Apps	(Gls)
2020–2025	Jong AZ	90	(3)
2021–2025	AZ	1	(0)
2025–	Cambuur	21	(1)
- * Club domestic league appearances and goals as of 28 April 2026

Jorn Berkhout (born 18 March 2002) is a Dutch professional footballer who plays as a centre-back for Eredivisie club Cambuur.

== Club career ==
=== AZ ===
On 17 May 2019, Berkhout signed his first professional contract with AZ, joining the club's reserve side, Jong AZ, in the Eerste Divisie. He made his professional debut for Jong AZ on 2 October 2020, completing the full 90 minutes in a 3–3 league draw away to MVV. Berkhout earned his senior AZ debut on 16 May 2021, replacing Fredrik Midtsjø in the 83rd minute of a 5–0 Eredivisie home victory over Heracles Almelo.

In January 2022 he sustained a pubic‑bone and groin injury that sidelined him for 16 months, returning to competitive action with Jong AZ in May 2023.

=== Cambuur ===
On 13 June 2025, Berkhout signed a three‑year contract with Cambuur ahead of the 2025–26 Eerste Divisie season.
