= Abdelnour Soualhia =

French footballer (born 2001)

- Soualhia with Telstar in 2026

Personal information
- Date of birth: 27 June 2001 (age 25)
- Place of birth: Saint-Michel, France
- Height: 1.94 m (6 ft 4 in)
- Position: Centre-back

Team information
- Current team: Telstar (on loan from AZ)
- Number: 4

Youth career
- Angoulême Charente
- Limoges
- Trélissac

Senior career*
Years	Team	Apps	(Gls)
2019–2021	Cognac	14	(0)
2021–2024	Avoine	67	(5)
2024–2026	Le Puy	47	(2)
2026–	AZ	0	(0)
2026–	→ Telstar (loan)	12	(3)
- * Club domestic league appearances and goals as of 09:57, 10 November 2026 (UTC)

Abdelnour Soualhia (born 27 June 2001) is a French professional footballer who plays as a centre-back for Eredivisie club Telstar, on loan from AZ.

Soualhia spent his senior career in the French lower divisions with Cognac, Avoine and Le Puy before joining AZ on a free transfer in 2026.

== Early life ==
Soualhia is from Saint-Michel, a suburb of Angoulême in the Charente department. He began playing football in the town, then moved to Limoges, where he played at under-17 national level, and afterwards to Trélissac at under-19 national level.

== Club career ==
=== France ===
Soualhia began his senior career at UA Cognac in National 3, across seasons curtailed by the COVID-19 pandemic, and played few matches there. He then joined Avoine OCC, also in National 3, and won promotion to National 2 in his second season at the club. He played 19 matches in the fourth tier in the 2023–24 season and scored twice.

Le Puy Foot 43 signed Soualhia from Avoine in June 2024 as their second summer signing. He established himself in the side and played 23 Championnat National matches in 2025–26, scoring twice.

=== AZ ===
On 26 June 2026, AZ signed Soualhia on a free transfer from Le Puy on a contract until mid-2028 with an option for a further year, and loaned him to fellow Eredivisie club Telstar for the season. Technical director Niels van Duinen said the loan would let Soualhia get used to Dutch football culture and gain Eredivisie experience immediately.

Soualhia made his Eredivisie debut on 8 August 2026, starting in a 2–1 win away to NEC. He headed on a long throw from Jeff Hardeveld for Patrick Brouwer to open the scoring inside the first minute, from a routine the side had worked on in training. A week later he scored his first goal for the club in a 3–1 home defeat by Sparta Rotterdam, having moved forward as an extra attacker late on, lifting the ball over goalkeeper Filip Bednarek and into an empty net in first-half stoppage time of the second period.

== Style of play ==
Standing at 1.94 metres, Soualhia is described as a left-footed and physically strong central defender.

== Career statistics ==
As of match played 7 November 2026

Appearances and goals by club, season and competition
Club	Season	League			National cup (Note: Includes Coupe de France, KNVB Cup)		Other		Total	
Club	Season	Division	Apps	Goals	Apps	Goals	Apps	Goals	Apps	Goals
Cognac	2019–20	National 3	8	0	0	0	—		8	0
Cognac	2020–21	National 3	6	0	0	0	—		6	0
Cognac	Total		14	0	0	0	—		14	0
Avoine	2021–22	National 3	23	1	0	0	—		23	1
Avoine	2022–23	National 3	25	2	4	0	—		29	2
Avoine	2023–24	National 2	19	2	4	0	—		23	2
Avoine	Total		67	5	8	0	—		75	5
Le Puy	2024–25	National 2	24	0	4	0	—		28	0
Le Puy	2025–26	Championnat National	23	2	2	0	—		25	2
Le Puy	Total		47	2	6	0	—		53	2
AZ	2026–27	Eredivisie	0	0	0	0	—		0	0
Telstar (loan)	2026–27	Eredivisie	12	3	1	0	—		13	3
Career total			140	10	15	0	0	0	155	10
