= Tomas Galvez =

Footballer (born 2005)

Personal information
- Full name: Tomas Kristian Galvez
- Date of birth: 28 January 2005 (age 21)
- Place of birth: London, England
- Height: 1.76 m (5 ft 9 in)
- Position: Left-back

Team information
- Current team: Go Ahead Eagles
- Number: 27

Youth career
- –2015: Tottenham Hotspur
- 2016–2021: Watford
- 2021–2024: Manchester City

Senior career*
Years	Team	Apps	(Gls)
2024–2026	Manchester City	0	(0)
2024	→ LASK (loan)	3	(0)
2024	→ LASK II (loan)	3	(0)
2025–2026	→ Cambuur (loan)	51	(0)
2026–	Go Ahead Eagles	3	(0)

International career^{‡}
2019	Finland U15	3	(0)
2021–2022	Finland U17	6	(0)
2022	Finland U18	1	(0)
2022	Finland U19	5	(0)
2023–	Finland U21	15	(1)
2023–	Finland	5	(0)
- * Club domestic league appearances and goals as of 23 October 2026 ‡ National team caps and goals as of 31 March 2026

Tomas Kristian Galvez (born 28 January 2005) is a professional footballer who plays as a left-back for Eredivisie club Go Ahead Eagles. Born in England, he plays for the Finland national team.

Galvez began his career with Tottenham and made his debut on senior level on 25 August 2024 at the age of 19 in an Austrian Bundesliga match in the ranks of LASK in a match against Austria Wien.

== Club career ==
=== Manchester City ===
Galvez is a youth product of Watford and after five years with them moved to the youth academy of Manchester City in 2021. He has played for them up to U23 level. In July 2022, he signed his first professional contract with the club on a two-year deal.

==== Loan to LASK ====
On 7 August 2024, Galves joined Austrian Bundesliga club LASK on a season-long loan deal. He made his debut on senior club level on 25 August 2024 in an Austrian Bundesliga match at Franz Horr Stadium, Vienna against Austria Wien when he replaced George Bello on 55th minute.

==== Loans to Cambuur ====
On 12 January 2025, his loan deal with LASK was terminated, and he was subsequently sent on loan to Eerste Divisie club Cambuur for the rest of the season. On 29 July 2025, SC Cambuur and Manchester City agreed on a new loan deal for the 2025–26 season.

=== Go Ahead Eagles ===
On 7 July 2026, Galvez signed a four-season contract with Go Ahead Eagles in the Dutch top-tier Eredivisie.

== International career ==
Born in England, Galvez is of Spanish descent through his father and Finnish descent through his mother. He opted to represent Finland's national football team internationally, having represented them at various youth levels.

He made his international debut with the Finland senior national team in a 2–0 friendly loss to Sweden on 9 January 2023, at the age of 17. On 20 November 2023, Galvez made his competitive senior international debut, in a UEFA Euro 2024 qualifying match against San Marino. He provided an assist in a 1–2 away win.

== Career statistics ==
=== Club ===
As of 27 October 2026

Appearances and goals by club, season and competition
Club	Season	League			National cup (Note: Includes Austrian Cup and KNVB Cup)		Europe		Other		Total	
Club	Season	Division	Apps	Goals	Apps	Goals	Apps	Goals	Apps	Goals	Apps	Goals
LASK (loan)	2024–25	Austrian Bundesliga	3	0	1	0	0	0	–		4	0
LASK II (loan)	2024–25	Austrian Regionalliga	3	0	–		–		–		3	0
Cambuur (loan)	2024–25	Eerste Divisie	15	0	0	0	–		2 (Note: Appearances in Eredivisie promotion play-offs)	0	17	0
Cambuur (loan)	2025–26	Eerste Divisie	36	0	1	0	–		–		37	0
Cambuur (loan)	Total		51	0	1	0	0	0	2	0	54	0
Go Ahead Eagles	2026–27	Eredivisie	3	0	1	1	—		—		4	1
Career total			60	0	3	1	0	0	2	0	65	1

=== International ===
As of match played 10 October 2024

Appearances and goals by national team and year
National team	Year	Apps	Goals
Finland	2023	2	0
Finland	2024	3	0
Total		5	0

== Honours ==
Cambuur

- Eerste Divisie runner-up: 2025–26

Individual

- Football Association of Finland: The Best Young Player 2023
