= Lars Lambooij =

Dutch football executive and former player (born 1988)

Personal information
- Date of birth: 16 April 1988 (age 38)
- Place of birth: Tilburg, Netherlands
- Height: 1.77 m (5 ft 10 in)
- Position: Midfielder

Team information
- Current team: Cambuur (technical director)

Youth career
- –1997: GSBW
- 1997–2009: Willem II

Senior career*
Years	Team	Apps	(Gls)
2009–2013	Veendam	103	(10)
2013–2017	Go Ahead Eagles	68	(0)
Total		172	(10)
- * Club domestic league appearances and goals

Lars Lambooij (born 16 April 1988) is a Dutch football executive and former player who is the technical director of Eredivisie club Cambuur.

== Playing career ==
Lambooij began his career in the youth system of Goirlese Sportvereniging Blauw-Wit (GSBW) before joining Willem II, where he featured only at reserve level for the Eredivisie club. In 2009, he moved to Veendam together with teammate Michael de Leeuw, making his professional debut on 7 August that year in an away fixture against Haarlem. Veendam were declared bankrupt in March 2013, and Lambooij subsequently trained with Groningen. In January 2014, he signed for Go Ahead Eagles, where he remained until 2017, when he retired from professional football because of persistent injuries.

== Scouting and executive career ==
Following his retirement in 2017, Lambooij joined Go Ahead Eagles as a scout. In June 2020, he moved to RKC Waalwijk, where his scouting work was supported by the club's video and data analysts. On 16 April 2024, he was appointed technical director of Cambuur on a four-year contract, following protracted negotiations with RKC. An arbitration case at the Royal Dutch Football Association (KNVB) had set his release fee at €100,000, after which the clubs reached a private settlement. He succeeded Etiënne Reijnen, who had left five months earlier to become an assistant coach at Feyenoord.

== Career statistics ==
Appearances and goals by club, season and competition
Club	Season	League			KNVB Cup		Europe		Other		Total	
Club	Season	Division	Apps	Goals	Apps	Goals	Apps	Goals	Apps	Goals	Apps	Goals
Veendam	2009–10	Eerste Divisie	17	1	1	0	—		—		18	1
Veendam	2010–11	Eerste Divisie	30	3	2	0	—		2 (Note: Appearance(s) in Eredivisie promotion/relegation playoffs)	0	34	3
Veendam	2011–12	Eerste Divisie	30	5	1	0	—		—		31	5
Veendam	2012–13	Eerste Divisie	26	1	1	0	—		—		27	1
Veendam	Total		103	10	5	0	—		2	0	110	10
Go Ahead Eagles	2013–14	Eredivisie	23	0	2	0	—		—		25	0
Go Ahead Eagles	2014–15	Eredivisie	18	0	1	0	—		2	0	21	0
Go Ahead Eagles	2015–16	Eerste Divisie	21	0	1	0	2 (Note: Appearances in UEFA Europa League)	0	4	0	28	0
Go Ahead Eagles	2016–17	Eredivisie	6	0	1	0	—		—		7	0
Go Ahead Eagles	Total		68	0	5	0	2	0	6	0	81	0
Career total			171	10	10	0	2	0	8	0	191	10
