= Ismaël Baouf =

Footballer (born 2006)

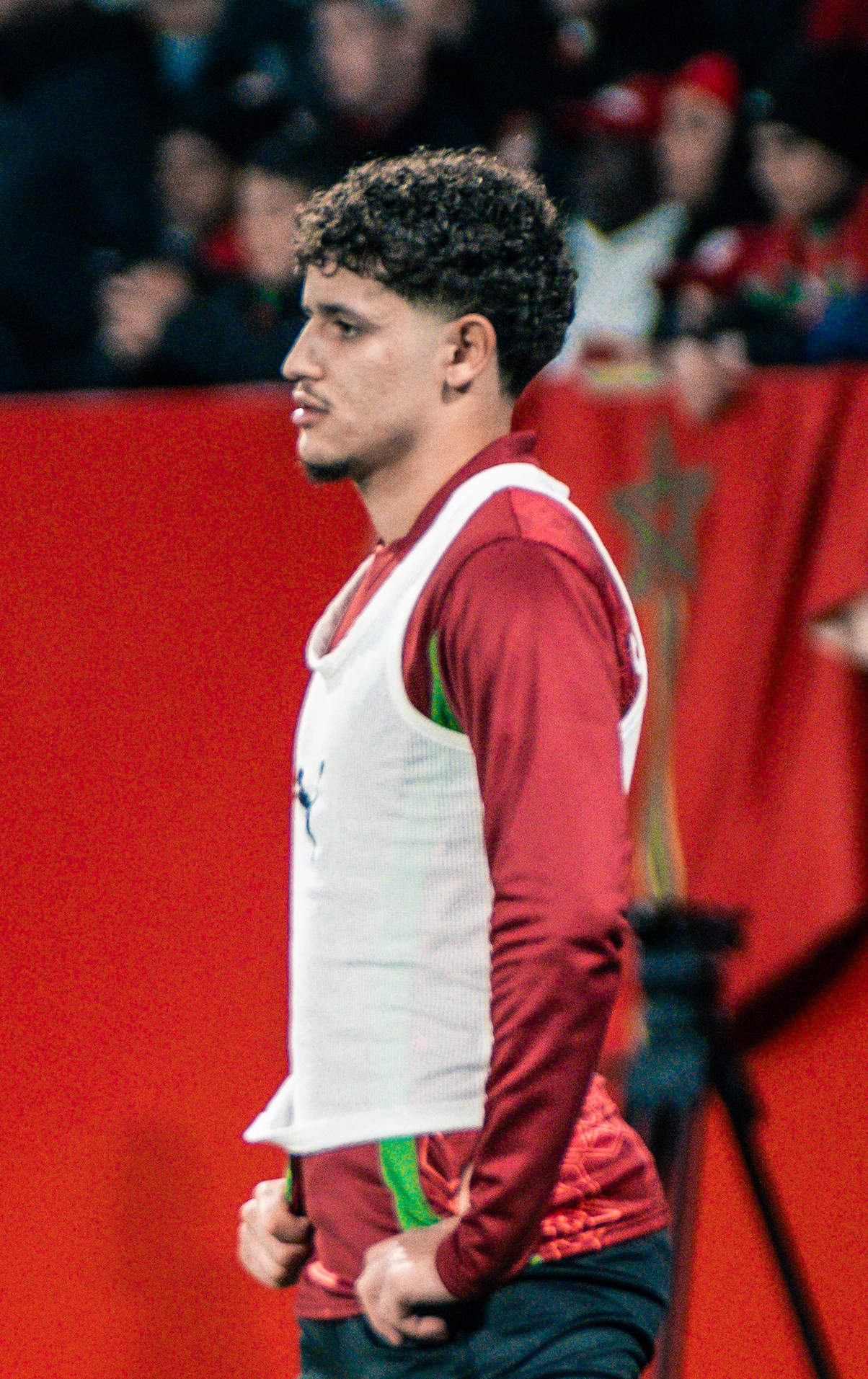
- Baouf with Morocco in 2026

Personal information
- Date of birth: 17 September 2006 (age 20)
- Place of birth: Tubize, Belgium
- Height: 1.83 m (6 ft 0 in)
- Position: Centre-back

Team information
- Current team: Cambuur
- Number: 4

Youth career
- Olympic Charleroi
- 2016–2022: Royal Charleroi
- 2022–2023: Anderlecht

Senior career*
Years	Team	Apps	(Gls)
2023–2025	RSCA Futures	51	(3)
2025–	Cambuur	40	(7)

International career^{‡}
2021–2022	Belgium U16	10	(2)
2022–2023	Belgium U17	10	(0)
2023–2024	Belgium U18	6	(1)
2024	Belgium U19	2	(0)
2024–2025	Morocco U20	17	(1)
2026–	Morocco U23	1	(0)
2026–	Morocco	1	(0)
Medal record
Men's football
Representing Morocco
FIFA U-20 World Cup
Winner	2025 Chile
U-20 Africa Cup of Nations
Runner-up	2025 Egypt
- * Club domestic league appearances and goals as of 31 October 2026 ‡ National team caps and goals as of 1 October 2026

Ismaël Baouf (born 17 September 2006) is a professional footballer who plays as a centre-back for Eredivisie club Cambuur. Born in Belgium, he plays for the Morocco national team.

== Early life ==
Baouf was born on 17 September 2006 in Tubize. He is the son of former professional footballer Rachid Baouf.

== Club career ==
Baouf began his youth career with Olympic Charleroi before moving to Royal Charleroi. In April 2022, it was announced that he would join the youth academy of Anderlecht. On 21 April 2023, Baouf made his debut for RSCA Futures, the reserve team of Anderlecht, in a goalless draw against Club NXT. On 20 June 2023, he signed his first professional contract with Anderlecht until June 2026.

On 12 August 2025, Baouf joined Dutch club Cambuur on a three-year contract. He made his debut for the club on 15 August in a 1–0 win against TOP Oss. He scored his first goal for Cambuur on 31 August in a 3–1 league win over VVV-Venlo.

== International career ==
Born in Belgium and of Moroccan descent, Baouf is eligible to represent both countries in international football. He has represented Belgium at various youth levels up to the under-19 level.

In October 2024, Baouf's father announced that his son would represent Morocco in the future. In April 2025, he was included in Morocco's squad for the 2025 U-20 Africa Cup of Nations. Morocco ultimately finished as runners-up, losing the final to South Africa. In September 2025, Baouf was named in the squad for the 2025 FIFA U-20 World Cup. He played in all seven matches for the team, helping Morocco win the tournament for the first time.

In March 2026, Baouf received his first call-up to the Morocco national team.

== Career statistics ==
=== Club ===
As of match played 31 October 2026

Appearances and goals by club, season and competition
Club	Season	League			Cup (Note: Includes KNVB Cup)		Total	
Club	Season	Division	Apps	Goals	Apps	Goals	Apps	Goals
RSCA Futures	2022–23	CPL	2	0	—		2	0
RSCA Futures	2023–24	CPL	23	1	—		23	1
RSCA Futures	2023–24	CPL	26	2	—		26	2
RSCA Futures	Total		51	3	0	0	51	3
Cambuur	2025–26	Eerste Divisie	29	6	1	0	30	6
Cambuur	2026–27	Eredivisie	11	1	1	0	12	1
Cambuur	Total		40	7	2	0	42	7
Career total			91	10	2	0	93	10

=== International ===
As of match played 26 May 2026

Appearances and goals by national team and year
National team	Year	Apps	Goals
Morocco	2026	1	0
Total		1	0

== Honours ==
Morocco U20

- FIFA U-20 World Cup: 2025
- U-20 Africa Cup of Nations runner-up: 2025
