= Sami Bouhoudane =

Moroccan footballer (born 2008)

Personal information
- Date of birth: 13 January 2008 (age 18)
- Place of birth: Bergen op Zoom, Netherlands
- Height: 1.88 m (6 ft 2 in)
- Position: Striker

Team information
- Current team: Cambuur
- Number: 7

Youth career
- 2018–2025: PSV

Senior career*
Years	Team	Apps	(Gls)
2024–2026	Jong PSV	23	(7)
2026–	Cambuur	8	(0)

International career^{‡}
2022	Netherlands U15	2	(0)
2022–2023	Netherlands U16	8	(4)
2023–2025	Netherlands U17	13	(3)
2025	Netherlands U18	2	(1)
2026–	Morocco U23	1	(0)
- * Club domestic league appearances and goals as of 11 October 2026 ‡ National team caps and goals as of 22:08, 4 August 2026 (UTC)

Sami Bouhoudane (Arabic: سامي بوهودان; born 13 January 2008) is a professional footballer who plays as a striker for Eredivisie club Cambuur. Born in the Netherlands, he is a youth international for Morocco.

== Early life ==
Born in Bergen op Zoom in the Netherlands, Bouhoudane is of Moroccan descent.

== Club career ==
Bouhoudane is a PSV academy graduate who progressed through the club's youth system. On 26 August 2022, aged 14, he signed a pre‑contract with the club to take effect from 14 January 2023, the day after his 15th birthday, running until 2026. Bouhoudane made his professional debut for Jong PSV as a substitute in a 3–0 loss to Jong Ajax in the Eerste Divisie. Aged 16 years and 52 days, he became PSV's youngest debutant in the competition. On 10 July 2025, he extended his contract with the club until 2027.

On 5 August 2026, Bouhoudane signed a contract with Cambuur for three seasons, with an optional fourth season.

== International career ==
In August 2024, he was first called up to the Netherlands U18s.

On 13 March 2026, Bouhoudane received approval from FIFA to switch his international allegiance to the Morocco national team. He was called up to the Morocco U23 a couple of weeks later for a set of friendlies.

== Career statistics ==
=== Club ===
As of match played 20 March 2026

Appearances and goals by club, season and competition
Club	Season	League			KNVB Cup		Other		Total	
Club	Season	Division	Apps	Goals	Apps	Goals	Apps	Goals	Apps	Goals
Jong PSV	2023–24	Eerste Divisie	1	0	—		—		1	0
Jong PSV	2024–25	Eerste Divisie	1	0	—		—		1	0
Jong PSV	2025–26	Eerste Divisie	16	6	—		—		18	6
Career total			18	6	—		—		18	6
