= SC Cambuur =

Dutch association football club

Cambuur
- Full name: Sportclub Cambuur
- Nicknames: The Yellow-Blues; SCC
- Founded: 19 June 1964; 62 years ago
- Stadium: Kooi Stadion
- Capacity: 15,000
- Head coach: Johan Plat
- League: Eredivisie
- 2025–26: Eerste Divisie, 2nd of 20 (promoted)
- Website: cambuur.nl
| Home colours | Away colours |

Sportclub Cambuur, most often styled SC Cambuur (Dutch pronunciation: [ɛsˈseː ˈkɑmbyːr]) and sometimes Cambuur Leeuwarden, is a Dutch professional football club in Leeuwarden, the capital of Friesland. Founded on 19 June 1964, the team compete in the Eredivisie, the top tier of Dutch football, following promotion from the Eerste Divisie in the 2025–26 season. Since August 2024, they have played their home games at the 15,000‑seat Kooi Stadion, a purpose‑built stadium that replaced Cambuur Stadion.

Cambuur play in yellow shirts and blue shorts, colours drawn from the coat of arms of the Cammingha family, whose heraldic lions also feature on the club crest. Organised as a member‑owned association, the club enjoys strong regional backing and contests the "Friese Derby" against neighbouring sc Heerenveen.

The club have won the second-tier Eerste Divisie three times (1991–92, 2012–13 and 2020–21) and spent a total of nine seasons in the top-tier Eredivisie. Away from the pitch Cambuur operate an accredited youth academy and the Cambuur Foundation, which runs grassroots sport and social‑inclusion programmes throughout Friesland.

== History ==
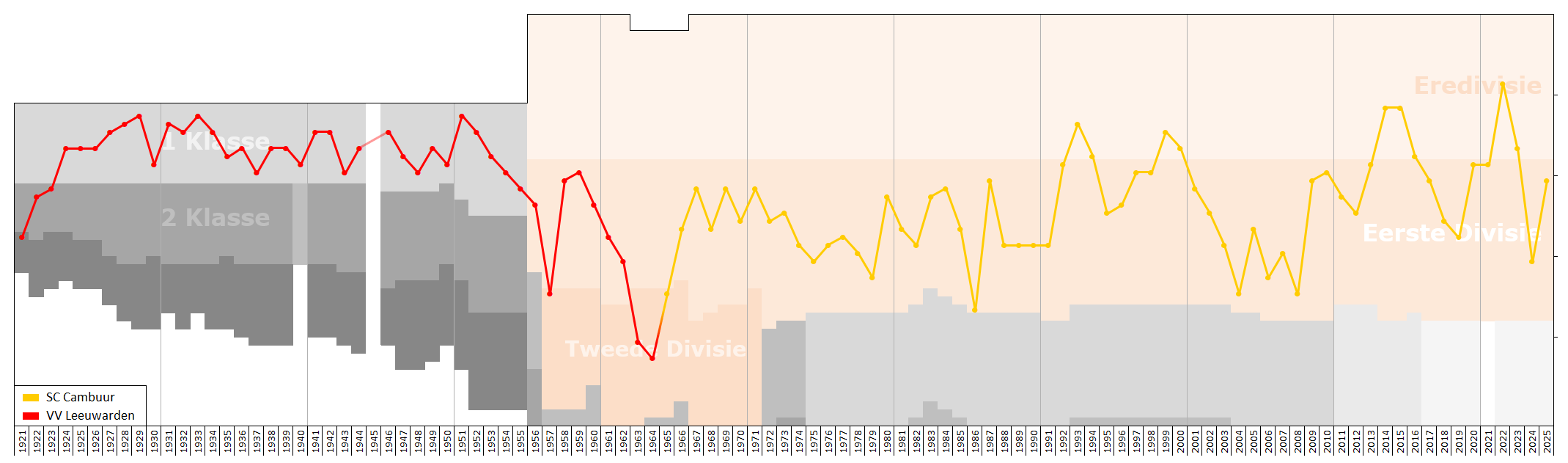
Historical chart of league performance

Founded in 1964, SC Cambuur has spent a total of nine seasons in the Dutch top flight, the Eredivisie. During the 1980s and 1990s, the club was a consistent contender in the Eerste Divisie promotion play-offs. Cambuur won the Eerste Divisie title in 1992 and earned promotion to the Eredivisie, but were relegated two seasons later following the 1993–94 season. In 1998, the club returned to the Eredivisie, though they were again relegated after just two seasons, in the 1999–2000 season.

The early 2000s proved turbulent, and in 2005 the club narrowly avoided bankruptcy. A period of restructuring began in 2006, and by 2010 Cambuur had achieved relative financial stability.

In 2009, Cambuur came close to promotion, narrowly losing a play-off to Roda JC on penalties. The following year, they finished second in the league and again missed promotion by a slim margin. The club attracted over 40,000 spectators during that year's play-offs, with an estimated 7,000 supporters gathering in Leeuwarden's city centre to watch the decisive match against Roda on a large screen. The final match drew a record 1.4 million television viewers in the Netherlands, and the entire play-off series—featuring Cambuur, PEC Zwolle, and Roda JC—was watched by more than 4.5 million people.

Cambuur won the Eerste Divisie title in the 2012–13 season, earning promotion to the Eredivisie for the 2013–14 season. On 1 May 2016, they were relegated back to the Eerste Divisie after a 6–2 away defeat to PSV.

In 2020, Cambuur were leading the Eerste Divisie when the season was voided due to the COVID-19 pandemic, and the club was controversially denied promotion to the Eredivisie.

The club returned to the top flight after winning the 2020–21 Eerste Divisie title. In the 2021–22 season, Cambuur achieved a ninth-place finish—the highest league position in the club's history. However, the following campaign proved difficult, and on 6 May 2023, Cambuur were relegated back to the Eerste Divisie following a 3–0 away defeat to FC Utrecht.

Cambuur secured promotion to the Eredivisie for the 2026–27 season after finishing as runners-up in the 2025–26 Eerste Divisie.

== Supporters ==
Cambuur has a group of ultras, known as the M.I.-Side, who stand on the north stand at the Kooi Stadion, but used to stand at both the north and south stands at the Cambuur Stadion. The name derives from the street names in which the stands of the Cambuur stadion were built: M stands for Marathonstraat and I for Insulindestraat. They are among the most notorious in the Netherlands. In the 2009–10 season, the average attendance was 8,600 fans per game, and more than 6,500 season tickets were sold. That was a new record for Cambuur, as these numbers were achieved while the club was in the second division but even higher than when it played in the Eredivisie. In the 2009–10 season, the club sold out six regular season matches with 10,000 fans per game, another milestone for the Leeuwarden-based club. Never before in the second division it had sold out that many regular season matches.

== Current squad ==
As of 10 September 2026

Note: Flags indicate national team as defined under FIFA eligibility rules; some limited exceptions apply. Players may hold more than one non-FIFA nationality.

| No. | Pos. | Nation | Player |
|---|---|---|---|
| 1 | GK | NED | Thijs Jansen |
| 2 | DF | ITA | Devid Eugene Bouah |
| 3 | DF | NED | Jorn Berkhout |
| 4 | DF | MAR | Ismaël Baouf |
| 5 | MF | BEL | Wout Asselman (on loan from KAA Gent) |
| 6 | DF | NED | Jamal Amofa |
| 7 | FW | MAR | Sami Bouhoudane |
| 8 | MF | CUW | Nicky Souren |
| 9 | FW | NED | Skye Vink |
| 10 | MF | MAR | Rafik El Arguioui (on loan from Utrecht) |
| 11 | FW | FRA | Ilyes Hamache |
| 13 | FW | AUT | Nicolas Binder |
| 14 | DF | NED | Billy van Duijl (on loan from AZ Alkmaar) |
| 15 | FW | NOR | Fabian Kvam |

| No. | Pos. | Nation | Player |
|---|---|---|---|
| 16 | DF | NED | Rik Mulders |
| 17 | MF | FRA | Ethan Apkakou |
| 18 | MF | NED | Wiebe van der Heide |
| 19 | FW | NED | Danyello Look |
| 20 | MF | NED | Daan Visser |
| 21 | GK | NED | Jasper Meijster |
| 22 | GK | GER | Luca Plogmann |
| 23 | DF | NED | Lucas Jetten |
| 24 | GK | NED | Matthijs Kalisvaart |
| 27 | DF | NED | Wiebe Kooistra |
| 28 | DF | FRA | Morgan Costarelli |
| 29 | FW | NED | Iwan Henstra |
| 30 | FW | GER | Jason Ceka (on loan from SV Elversberg) |
| 33 | MF | BEL | Mathieu Maertens |

== Honours ==
- Eerste Divisie
  - Winners (3): 1991–92, 2012–13, 2020–21
  - Runners-up (4): 1996–97, 1997–98, 2009–10, 2025–26
- Tweede Divisie
  - Winners (2): 1956–57, 1964–65

== Recent history ==
Below is a table with Cambuur's domestic results since the introduction of professional football in 1956.

Domestic Results since 1956
| Domestic league | League result | Qualification to | KNVB Cup season | Cup result |
|---|---|---|---|---|
| 2025–26 Eerste Divisie | 2nd | Eredivisie (promotion) | 2025–26 | first round |
| 2024–25 Eerste Divisie | 3rd | promotion/relegation play-offs: no promotion | 2024–25 | second round |
| 2023–24 Eerste Divisie | 13th | – | 2023–24 | semi-finals |
| 2022–23 Eredivisie | 17th | Eerste Divisie (relegation) | 2022–23 | second round |
| 2021–22 Eredivisie | 9th | – | 2021–22 | second round |
| 2020–21 Eerste Divisie | 1st | Eredivisie (promotion) | 2020–21 | second round |
| 2019–20 Eerste Divisie | (no title awarded) | Season abandoned due to COVID-19 pandemic | 2019–20 | second round |
| 2018–19 Eerste Divisie | 10th | promotion/relegation play-offs: no promotion | 2018–19 | round of 16 |
| 2017–18 Eerste Divisie | 8th | promotion/relegation play-offs: no promotion | 2017–18 | quarter-finals |
| 2016–17 Eerste Divisie | 3rd | promotion/relegation play-offs: no promotion | 2016–17 | semi-finals |
| 2015–16 Eredivisie | 18th | Eerste Divisie (relegation) | 2015–16 | second round |
| 2014–15 Eredivisie | 12th | – | 2014–15 | quarter-finals |
| 2013–14 Eredivisie | 12th | – | 2013–14 | round of 16 |
| 2012–13 Eerste Divisie | 1st | Eredivisie (promotion) | 2012–13 | Round of 16 |
| 2011–12 Eerste Divisie | 7th | promotion/relegation play-offs: no promotion | 2011–12 | second round |
| 2010–11 Eerste Divisie | 5th | promotion/relegation play-offs: no promotion | 2010–11 | fourth round |
| 2009–10 Eerste Divisie | 2nd | promotion/relegation play-offs: no promotion | 2009–10 | second round |
| 2008–09 Eerste Divisie | 3rd | promotion/relegation play-offs: no promotion | 2008–09 | third round |
| 2007–08 Eerste Divisie | 17th | – | 2007–08 | third round |
| 2006–07 Eerste Divisie | 12th | – | 2006–07 | second round |
| 2005–06 Eerste Divisie | 15th | – | 2005–06 | second round |
| 2004–05 Eerste Divisie | 9th | – | 2004–05 | second round |
| 2003–04 Eerste Divisie | 17th | – | 2003–04 | third round |
| 2002–03 Eerste Divisie | 11th | – | 2002–03 | second round |
| 2001–02 Eerste Divisie | 7th | promotion/relegation play-offs: no promotion | 2001–02 | third round |
| 2000–01 Eerste Divisie | 4th | promotion/relegation play-offs: no promotion | 2000–01 | third round |
| 1999–2000 Eredivisie | 17th | Eerste Divisie (losing promo./releg. play-off) | 1999–2000 | second round |
| 1998–99 Eredivisie | 15th | – | 1998–99 | round of 16 |
| 1997–98 Eerste Divisie | 2nd | Eredivisie (winning promo./releg. play-off) | 1997–98 | second round |
| 1996–97 Eerste Divisie | 2nd | promotion/relegation play-off: no promotion | 1996–97 | second round |
| 1995–96 Eerste Divisie | 6th | – | 1995–96 | quarter-finals |
| 1994–95 Eerste Divisie | 7th | – | 1994–95 | second round |
| 1993–94 Eredivisie | 18th | Eerste Divisie (relegation) | 1993–94 | second round |
| 1992–93 Eredivisie | 14th | – | 1992–93 | third round |
| 1991–92 Eerste Divisie | 1st | Eredivisie (promotion) | 1991–92 | third round |
| 1990–91 Eerste Divisie | 11th | – | 1990–91 | second round |
| 1989–90 Eerste Divisie | 11th | – | 1989–90 | first round |
| 1988–89 Eerste Divisie | 11th | – | 1988–89 | first round |
| 1987–88 Eerste Divisie | 11th | – | 1987–88 | second round |
| 1986–87 Eerste Divisie | 3rd | promotion competition: no promotion | 1986–87 | first round |
| 1985–86 Eerste Divisie | 19th | – | 1985–86 | first round |
| 1984–85 Eerste Divisie | 9th | – | 1984–85 | second round |
| 1983–84 Eerste Divisie | 4th | – | 1983–84 | first round |
| 1982–83 Eerste Divisie | 5th | promotion competition: no promotion | 1982–83 | second round |
| 1981–82 Eerste Divisie | 11th | – | 1981–82 | second round |
| 1980–81 Eerste Divisie | 9th | – | 1980–81 | first round |
| 1979–80 Eerste Divisie | 5th | promotion competition: no promotion | 1979–80 | second round |
| 1978–79 Eerste Divisie | 15th | – | 1978–79 | first round |
| 1977–78 Eerste Divisie | 12th | – | 1977–78 | second round |
| 1976–77 Eerste Divisie | 10th | – | 1976–77 | first round |
| 1975–76 Eerste Divisie | 11th | – | 1975–76 | first round |
| 1974–75 Eerste Divisie | 13th | – | 1974–75 | second round |
| 1973–74 Eerste Divisie | 11th | – | 1973–74 | first round |
| 1972–73 Eerste Divisie | 7th | – | 1972–73 | first round |
| 1971–72 Eerste Divisie | 8th | – | 1971–72 | did not participate |
| 1970–71 Eerste Divisie | 4th | – | 1970–71 | round of 16 |
| 1969–70 Eerste Divisie | 8th | – | 1969–70 | first round |
| 1968–69 Eerste Divisie | 4th | – | 1968–69 | first round |
| 1967–68 Eerste Divisie | 9th | – | 1967–68 | group stage |
| 1966–67 Eerste Divisie | 4th | – | 1966–67 | first round |
| 1965–66 Eerste Divisie | 9th | – | 1965–66 | group stage |
| 1964–65 Tweede Divisie | 1st (winning championship play-off) | Eerste Divisie (promotion) | 1964–65 | first round |
| 1963–64 Tweede Divisie | 9th (group A) (as VV Leeuwarden) | – | 1963–64 | first round |
| 1962–63 Tweede Divisie | 7th (group A) (as VV Leeuwarden) | – | 1962–63 | first round |
| 1961–62 Eerste Divisie | 13th (group A) (as VV Leeuwarden) | Tweede Divisie (relegation) | 1961–62 | ? |
| 1960–61 Eerste Divisie | 10th (group A) (as VV Leeuwarden) | – | 1960–61 | ? |
| 1959–60 Eerste Divisie | 6th (group B) (as VV Leeuwarden) | – | not held | not held |
| 1958–59 Eerste Divisie | 2nd (group A) (as VV Leeuwarden) | – | 1958–59 | ? |
| 1957–58 Eerste Divisie | 3rd (group B) (as VV Leeuwarden) | – | 1957–58 | ? |
| 1956–57 Tweede Divisie | 1st (group A) (as VV Leeuwarden) | Eerste Divisie (promotion) | 1956–57 | ? |

== Club staff ==
| Position | Staff |
|---|---|
| Manager | (Netherlands) Henk de Jong |
| Assistant Manager | (Netherlands) Jeroen Burghout (Netherlands) Rik Reinsma |
| Goalkeeper Coach | (Netherlands) Peter van der Vlag |
| Performance Coach | (Netherlands) Nicky Boonstra (Netherlands) Daan Ganzinga |
| Video Analyst | (Hungary) Gergely Balázs Sándor |
| Doctor | (Netherlands) Dirk Steensma (Netherlands) Antje Tardy (Netherlands) Monique Haaksema |
| Physiotherapist | (Netherlands) Harvey Bischop (Netherlands) Kevin Koster |
| Materialman | (Netherlands) Paul Jansen |
| Team Manager | (Netherlands) Peter Drijver (Netherlands) Niels Dissel |

== Managers ==
- (Netherlands) Jan Bens (1 July 1964 – 30 June 1966)
- (Netherlands) Piet de Wolf (1966–68)
- (Netherlands) Jan Bens (1 July 1968 – 30 June 1970)
- (Netherlands) Arie Otten (1 July 1970 – 30 June 1972)
- (Netherlands) Leo Beenhakker (1972–75)
- (Netherlands) Nol de Ruiter (1 July 1976 – 30 June 1980)
- (Netherlands) Henk de Jonge (1980–83)
- (Netherlands) Theo Verlangen (1983–85)
- (Netherlands) Simon Kistemaker (1 July 1985 – 30 June 1986)
- (Germany) Fritz Korbach (1 July 1986 – 30 June 1988)
- (Hungary) Sándor Popovics (1 June 1988 – 30 June 1990)
- (Netherlands) Rob Baan (1 July 1990 – 30 June 1992)
- (Netherlands) Theo de Jong (1 July 1992 – 30 September 1993)
- (Germany) Fritz Korbach (30 September 1993 – 31 January 1995)
- (Netherlands) Han Berger (1 July 1995 – 30 June 1998)
- (Netherlands) Gert Kruys (1 July 1998 – 18 May 2002)
- (Netherlands) Henny Lee (interim) (19 May 2002 – 30 June 2002)
- (England) Rob McDonald (1 July 2002 – 30 June 2003)
- (Netherlands) Dick de Boer (1 July 2003 – 31 December 2004)
- (Netherlands) Jan Schulting (31 December 2004 – 30 June 2005)
- (Netherlands) Roy Wesseling (1 July 2005 – 19 February 2007)
- (Netherlands) Gerrie Schouwenaar (2007)
- (Netherlands) Jurrie Koolhof (1 July 2007 – 14 September 2008)
- (Netherlands) Stanley Menzo (20 September 2008 – 27 October 2010)
- (Netherlands) Alfons Arts (27 October 2010 – 22 March 2013)
- (Netherlands) Henk de Jong (interim) (22 March 2013 – 30 June 2013)
- (Netherlands) Dwight Lodeweges (1 July 2013 – 1 April 2014)
- (Netherlands) Henk de Jong (2 April 2014 – 9 February 2016)
- (Netherlands) Marcel Keizer (15 February 2016 – 30 June 2016)
- (Netherlands) Rob Maas (30 June 2016 – 15 October 2016)
- (Netherlands) Sipke Hulshoff (15 October 2016 – 17 June 2017)
- (Netherlands) Marinus Dijkhuizen (1 July 2017 – 28 November 2017)
- (Netherlands) Sipke Hulshoff (28 November 2017 – 31 January 2018)
- (Netherlands) René Hake (31 January 2018 – 30 June 2019)
- (Netherlands) Henk de Jong (1 July 2019 – 20 October 2022)
- (Netherlands) Pascal Bosschaart & (Netherlands) Martijn Barto (interim) (20 October 2022 – 14 November 2022)
- (Netherlands) Sjors Ultee (14 November 2022 – 9 October 2023)
- (Netherlands) Henk de Jong (10 October 2023 – present)

== Notable former players ==
The players below had senior international cap(s) for their respective countries. Players whose name is listed represented their countries while playing for SC Cambuur.

Aruba

- (Aruba) Jayden Kruydenhof

Cameroon

- (Cameroon) Marc Mboua

Democratic Republic of Congo

- (Democratic Republic of the Congo) Jody Lukoki

Indonesia

- (Indonesia) Stefano Lilipaly

Iran

- (Iran) Reza Ghoochannejhad

Lithuania

- (Lithuania) Vytautas Andriuškevičius

Morocco

- (Morocco) Adnane Tighadouini

Netherlands

- (Netherlands) Bert Konterman
- (Netherlands) Michael Mols
- (Netherlands) Jaap Stam

Netherlands Antilles

- (Netherlands Antilles) Robin Nelisse

Nigeria

- (Nigeria) Bartholomew Ogbeche

Philippines

- (Philippines) Paul Mulders

Republic of Ireland

- (Republic of Ireland) Jack Byrne

Slovakia

- (Slovakia) Albert Rusnák

Ukraine

- (Ukraine) Yevhen Levchenko

United States

- (United States) Gregg Berhalter

Yugoslavia

- (Socialist Federal Republic of Yugoslavia) (North Macedonia) Milko Đurovski

== See also ==
- List of football clubs in the Netherlands
