= 1963 in association football =

The following are the association football events of the year 1963 throughout the world.

== Notable events ==
- Copa Libertadores 1963: Won by Santos FC after defeating Boca Juniors on an aggregate score of 5–3.
- May 1 – Persipura Jayapura association football club is founded in Indonesia.
- May 22 – A.C. Milan defeats Benfica, 2–1, to win their first European Cup.
- September 25 – Dutch side Willem II Tilburg makes its European debut with a draw (1–1) on home soil against Manchester United in the first round of the Cup Winners Cup.
- 1963 International Soccer League
  - League: West Ham United defeated Gornik Zabrze, 2–1 on aggregate.
  - Cup: Dukla Prague defeated West Ham United, 2–1, on aggregate.
- West Germany is one of the last countries in Europe to form a national league, Bundesliga, Germany's primary football competition.
  - Borussia Dortmund's Konietzka scored the first ever goal in the Bundesliga in 1963.

== Winners club national championship ==
- Argentina: Independiente
- Brazil: Santos
- East Germany: SC Motor Jena
- England: Everton
- France: AS Monaco
- Iceland: KR
- Italy: Inter Milan
- Mexico: Oro
- Netherlands: PSV Eindhoven
- Norway: Brann
- Scotland: Rangers
- Spain: Real Madrid
- Sweden: IFK Norrköping
- Turkey: Galatasaray
- West Germany: Borussia Dortmund

== International tournaments ==
- 1963 British Home Championship (October 20, 1962 – April 6, 1963)

Scotland

- Pan American Games in São Paulo, Brazil (April 20 – May 4, 1963)
  1. Brazil
  2. Argentina
  3. Chile
- African Cup of Nations in Ghana (November 22 – December 1, 1963)
  1. Ghana
  2. Sudan
  3. Egypt

== Births ==
- January 1
  - Alberigo Evani, Italian footballer and manager
  - Dražen Ladić, Croatian footballer and manager
  - István Varga, Hungarian professional footballer
- January 26 – José Mourinho, Portuguese manager
- March 11 – Hugo González, Chilean footballer
- March 13 – Aníbal González, Chilean footballer
- March 30 – Willem Brouwer, Dutch footballer
- April 7 – Bernard Lama, French international footballer
- April 15
  - Walter Casagrande, Brazilian international footballer
  - Horacio Macedo, Mexican football manager and former player
- May 8 – Jan de Jonge, Dutch footballer and manager
- June 27 – Gerrit Plomp, Dutch defender
- July 16
  - Srečko Katanec, Slovenian football manager and player
  - Goran Pandurović, Serbian footballer
- July 30 – Carlos Maldonado, Venezuelan footballer
- July 30 – Neil Webb, English footballer
- August 18 – Damir Kalapač, Croatian retired footballer
- September 17 – Nicolás Navarro, Mexican footballer
- September 19 – David Seaman, English international footballer
- September 29 – Claudio Tello, Chilean international footballer (died 2014)
- October 3 – Robert Veronese, Swedish former footballer
- October 12 – Mabi de Almeida, Angolan football coach (died 2010)
- October 12 – Alan McDonald, Northern Irish international footballer (died 2012)
- October 20 – Stan Valckx, Dutch footballer
- November 5 – Jean-Pierre Papin, French international footballer
- November 18 – Peter Schmeichel, Danish international footballer
- November 21 – Peter Bosz, Dutch footballer and manager
- November 27 – Roland Nilsson, Swedish footballer
- December 4 – Mike Snoei, Dutch footballer and manager
- December 11 – Mario Been, Dutch footballer and manager

== Deaths ==
=== January ===
- January 1 – Luiz Gervazoni, Brazilian defender, squad member at the 1930 FIFA World Cup. (56)

=== June ===
- June 3 – Dick MacNeill (65), Dutch footballer (born 1898)
