= 2025–26 Eerste Divisie =

Eerste Divisie
- Season: 2025–26
- Dates: 8 August 2025 – 24 April 2026
- Champions: ADO Den Haag
- Promoted: ADO Den Haag; Cambuur; Willem II
- Matches: 380
- Goals: 1,214 (3.19 per match)
- Top goalscorer: Romano Postema (24 goals)
- Biggest home win: Emmen 6–0 Eindhoven (11 October 2025); Roda JC Kerkrade 6–0 Den Bosch (17 October 2025)
- Biggest away win: MVV Maastricht 0–5 Willem II (22 March 2026)
- Highest scoring: Cambuur 5–3 Jong PSV (26 September 2025); Jong FC Utrecht 5–3 Jong PSV (19 January 2026)
- Longest winning run: 12 matches ADO Den Haag
- Longest unbeaten run: 14 matches ADO Den Haag
- Longest winless run: 15 matches Jong Ajax
- Longest losing run: 4 matches Jong PSV; Dordrecht; Eindhoven; Jong FC Utrecht; VVV-Venlo; TOP Oss; Jong AZ; MVV Maastricht; Jong Ajax

The 2025–26 Eerste Divisie, also known as the Keuken Kampioen Divisie for sponsorship reasons, was the 70th season of the Eerste Divisie, the second tier of football in the Netherlands since its establishment in 1956.

== Teams ==
A total of 20 teams took part in the league: 17 teams from the 2024–25 Eerste Divisie and 3 teams relegated from the 2024–25 Eredivisie. Almere City replaced 2024–25 Eerste Divisie champions Volendam after two seasons in the Eredivisie. RKC Waalwijk replaced second-placed Excelsior after six seasons in the Eredivisie. Willem II replaced Telstar following their loss in the promotion play-offs after one season in the Eredivisie.

On 31 July 2025, it was confirmed that Vitesse had lost their professional license due to financial issues, and therefore the club was not eligible to play in the Eerste Divisie. The KNVB announced that no other team was eligible to be promoted, and as a result the competition began to be played with 19 teams. Period titles would have been decided on the first 8 or 9 matches each team played within a period, depending on whether such a period would have had 9 or 10 match days.

On 3 September 2025, Vitesse won an appeal and regained their license, requiring them to be placed back in the league, and returning the league to the original 20-team rules.

Location of teams in the 2025–26 Eerste Divisie

=== Stadiums and locations ===
Club	Location	Venue	Capacity
ADO Den Haag	The Hague	WerkTalent Stadion	15,000
Almere City	Almere	Yanmar Stadion	4,501
Cambuur	Leeuwarden	Kooi Stadion	15,000
De Graafschap	Doetinchem	Stadion De Vijverberg	12,600
Den Bosch	's-Hertogenbosch	Stadion De Vliert	8,713
Dordrecht	Dordrecht	M-Scores Stadion	4,235
Eindhoven	Eindhoven	Jan Louwers Stadion	4,600
Emmen	Emmen	De Oude Meerdijk	8,600
Helmond Sport	Helmond	GS Staalwerken Stadion	3,600
Jong Ajax	Amsterdam	Sportpark De Toekomst	2,250
Jong AZ	Alkmaar	AFAS Trainingscomplex	1,000
Jong PSV	Eindhoven	PSV Campus De Herdgang	2,500
Jong FC Utrecht	Utrecht	Sportcomplex Zoudenbalch	450
MVV Maastricht	Maastricht	Stadion De Geusselt	9,500
RKC Waalwijk	Waalwijk	Mandemakers Stadion	7,508
Roda JC Kerkrade	Kerkrade	Parkstad Limburg Stadion	19,979
TOP Oss	Oss	Frans Heesenstadion	4,560
Vitesse	Arnhem	GelreDome	21,248
VVV-Venlo	Venlo	Covebo Stadion - De Koel	8,000
Willem II	Tilburg	Koning Willem II Stadion	14,700

=== Number of teams by provinces ===
Number of teams	Province	Team(s)
7	North Brabant	Den Bosch, Eindhoven, Helmond Sport, Jong PSV, RKC Waalwijk, TOP Oss, Willem II
3	Limburg	MVV Maastricht, Roda JC, VVV-Venlo
2	Gelderland	De Graafschap, Vitesse
2	North Holland	Jong Ajax, Jong AZ
2	South Holland	ADO Den Haag, Dordrecht
1	Drenthe	Emmen
1	Flevoland	Almere City
1	Friesland	Cambuur
1	Utrecht	Jong FC Utrecht

=== Personnel and kits ===
Note: Flags indicate national team as has been defined under FIFA eligibility rules. Players and managers may hold more than one non-FIFA nationality.

Team	President	Manager	Kit manufacturer	Shirt sponsors (front)	Shirt sponsors (back)	Shirt sponsors (sleeves)	Shorts sponsors
ADO Den Haag	(Netherlands) Natascha van Grinsven-Admiraal	(Germany) Robin Peter	Erreà		Biersteker	Erreà	
Almere City	(Netherlands) John Bes	(Netherlands) Jeroen Rijsdijk	Craft				
Cambuur	(Netherlands) Cees Heijboer	(Netherlands) Henk de Jong	Adidas	Bouwgroep Dijkstra Draisma		TanQYou, Effektief	None
De Graafschap	(Netherlands) Mart de Kruif	(Netherlands) Marinus Dijkhuizen	Robey	Onverwachtehoek.nl, De DakExpert	Flexfamily, Coffee Fresh	SWR	
Den Bosch	(Netherlands) Tommie van Alphen	(Netherlands) Ulrich Landvreugd	Vacant	Sanitairwinkel			
Dordrecht	(Netherlands) Hans de Zeeuw	(Netherlands) Dirk Kuyt	Capelli	Keukenwarenhuis.nl, Energiek Dordt		M-Scores	
Eindhoven	(Netherlands) Peter Bijvelds	(Netherlands) Jan Poortvliet	Macron	VDL		SRP Zuid	
Emmen	(Netherlands) Rinse Bleeker	(Netherlands) Menno van Dam	Hummel	Vandaglas	Hydrowear, Century Autolease	Punt Uit	
Helmond Sport	(Netherlands) Ron van den Bekerom	(Netherlands) Jurgen Seegers	Saller	Heel Helmond Sport, Dixap		Vescom, Elektro Vogels	
Jong Ajax	(Netherlands) Menno Geelen	(Netherlands) Paul Nuijten	Adidas	Ziggo	Ziggo Sport	Curaçao/ Team Rockstars IT	
Jong AZ	(Netherlands) Merijn Zeeman	(Netherlands) Frank Peereboom	Nike	Kansino	Elfi Vastgoed	Cavallaro Napoli	
Jong PSV	(Netherlands) Marcel Brands	(Netherlands) Stijn Schaars	Puma	Metropoolregio Brainport Eindhoven	GoodHabitz	TOTO Nederlandse Loterij	
Jong Utrecht	(Netherlands) Thijs van Es	(Netherlands) Mark Otten	Castore	Conclusion Digital Transformation		U4U	Dassy
MVV Maastricht	(Netherlands) Tom Daemen	(Netherlands) Peter van den Berg	Nike	TCC, Voetbalshop	Cloos For You	Maak.eu	
RKC Waalwijk	(Netherlands) Willem van der Linden	(Netherlands) Sander Duits	Stanno	Willy Naessens Industriebouw, JM van Delft & Zn.	Mandemakers, Van Mossel Automotive		Beekmans Heftrucks
Roda JC Kerkrade	(Netherlands) Jordens Peters	(Belgium) Kevin Van Dessel	Decathlon	Tribe Security, Juyst	Gezond in Mijnstreek, Rutten x Welling	Bijzonder Zorggroep, D&D Verhuur	Woodstone
TOP Oss	(Netherlands) Bas van Rossum	(Netherlands) Sjors Ultee	JDH	Noor Sportswear, Becoss		MD Stukadoors	
Vitesse	Henk Parren	(Germany) Rüdiger Rehm	Robey				
VVV-Venlo	(Netherlands) Guus Pennings	(Netherlands) Peter Uneken	Craft	Venlo.fit	VidaXL, Seacon Logistics	ProToGa Beveiliging, Personato Recruitment	Haa!
Willem II	(Netherlands) Merijn Goris	(Netherlands) John Stegeman	Robey	None	None	None	None

=== Managerial changes ===
Team	Outgoing manager	Manner of departure	Date of vacancy	Position in table	Replaced by	Date of appointment
ADO Den Haag	(Bosnia and Herzegovina) Darije Kalezić	End of contract	30 June 2025	Pre-season	(Germany) Robin Peter	14 July 2025
Dordrecht	(Netherlands) Melvin Boel	Signed by Go Ahead Eagles	30 June 2025	Pre-season	(Netherlands) Dirk Kuyt	1 July 2025
Emmen	(Netherlands) Alfons Arts	Mutual consent	30 June 2025	Pre-season	(Netherlands) Menno van Dam	1 July 2025
Helmond Sport	(Netherlands) Robert Maaskant	End of contract	30 June 2025	Pre-season	(Netherlands) Jurgen Seegers	1 July 2025
Jong Ajax	(Netherlands) Frank Peereboom	Moved to Ajax	30 June 2025	Pre-season	(Netherlands) Willem Weijs	1 July 2025
Jong PSV	(Netherlands) Alfons Groenendijk	End of contract	30 June 2025	Pre-season	(Netherlands) Stijn Schaars	1 July 2025
Jong FC Utrecht	(Netherlands) Ivar van Dinteren	End of contract	30 June 2025	Pre-season	(Netherlands) Mark Otten	1 July 2025
RKC Waalwijk	(Netherlands) Henk Fraser	End of contract	30 June 2025	Pre-season	(Netherlands) Sander Duits	1 July 2025
Roda JC Kerkrade	(Netherlands) Bas Sibum	Signed by Heracles Almelo	30 June 2025	Pre-season	(Belgium) Kevin Van Dessel	1 July 2025
Vitesse	(Netherlands) John van den Brom	End of contract	30 June 2025	Pre-season	(Germany) Rüdiger Rehm	1 July 2025
Willem II	(Belgium) Kristof Aelbrecht (a.i.)	End of interim spell	30 June 2025	Pre-season	(Netherlands) John Stegeman	1 July 2025
VVV-Venlo	(Netherlands) John Lammers	Mutual consent	11 September 2025	18th	(Netherlands) Ivo Rossen (a.i.)	11 September 2025
MVV Maastricht	(Netherlands) Edwin Hermans	Sacked	23 September 2025	19th	(Belgium) Davy Heymans (a.i.)	23 September 2025
VVV-Venlo	(Netherlands) Ivo Rossen (a.i.)	End of interim spell	30 September 2025	9th	(Netherlands) Peter Uneken	1 October 2025
MVV Maastricht	(Belgium) Davy Heymans (a.i.)	End of interim spell	22 October 2025	12th	(Netherlands) Peter van den Berg	22 October 2025
Jong AZ	(Netherlands) Lee-Roy Echteld	Moved to AZ	18 January 2026	18th	(Netherlands) Frank Peereboom	29 January 2026
Jong Ajax	(Netherlands) Willem Weijs	Sacked	10 February 2026	20th	(Spain) Óscar García	11 February 2026
Eindhoven	(Netherlands) Maurice Verberne	Mutual consent	19 February 2026	14th	(Netherlands) Jan Poortvliet (a.i.)	19 February 2026
Jong Ajax	(Spain) Óscar García	Moved to Ajax	8 March 2026	20th	(Netherlands) Paul Nuijten	9 March 2026

== League table ==
Pos	Team	Pld	W	D	L	GF	GA	GD	Pts	Promotion or qualification
1	ADO Den Haag (Note: Winner of the First and Second Period (Rounds 1–10 and 11–20)) (C, P)	38	29	2	7	90	37	+53	89	Promotion to the Eredivisie
2	Cambuur (Note: Winner of the Third Period (Rounds 21–29)) (P)	38	23	9	6	75	48	+27	78	Promotion to the Eredivisie
3	Willem II (Note: Winner of the Fourth Period (Round 30–38)) (O, P)	38	20	8	10	59	42	+17	68	Qualification for promotion play-offs quarterfinals
4	De Graafschap	38	18	9	11	74	58	+16	63	Qualification for promotion play-offs quarterfinals
5	Almere City	38	18	4	16	78	63	+15	58	Qualification for promotion play-offs first round
6	RKC Waalwijk	38	16	10	12	71	59	+12	58	Qualification for promotion play-offs first round
7	Jong PSV	38	17	5	16	66	64	+2	56	Reserve teams are not eligible to be promoted to the Eredivisie
8	Roda JC Kerkrade	38	14	13	11	59	54	+5	55	Qualification for promotion play-offs first round
9	Den Bosch	38	14	9	15	65	69	−4	51	Qualification for promotion play-offs first round
10	Dordrecht	38	12	11	15	48	56	−8	47	
11	Eindhoven	38	14	5	19	51	69	−18	47	
12	Jong FC Utrecht	38	12	10	16	58	62	−4	46	Reserve teams are not eligible to be promoted to the Eredivisie
13	VVV-Venlo	38	13	6	19	50	58	−8	45	
14	Emmen	38	12	9	17	58	72	−14	45	
15	Vitesse (Note: In the previous season, Vitesse were deducted 3 points for withholding information, another 3 points due to late submission of required information, and another 6 due to previous administrative shortcomings. Vitesse appealed the decisions of the deductions of these 12 points, and due to the decision of the rejection of the appeal coming after the end of the season, the penalty was instead moved to next season.)	38	15	11	12	64	55	+9	44	
16	TOP Oss	38	11	11	16	54	64	−10	44	
17	Jong AZ	38	12	4	22	61	76	−15	40	Reserve teams are not eligible to be promoted to the Eredivisie
18	Helmond Sport	38	10	9	19	42	62	−20	39	
19	MVV Maastricht	38	9	11	18	41	73	−32	38	
20	Jong Ajax	38	9	8	21	50	73	−23	35	Reserve teams are not eligible to be promoted to the Eredivisie

Source: Flashscore, Keuken Kampioen Divisie (in Dutch)
Rules for classification: Season in progress: 1) Most points won; 2) Less points lost; 3) Goal difference; 4) Goals scored; 5) Head-to-head points; 6) Head-to-head goal difference; 7) Head-to-head goals scored 8) Head-to-head away goals scored 9) Alphabetical order; End of season: 1) Points; 2) Goal difference; 3) Goals scored; 4) Head-to-head points; 5) Head-to-head goal difference; 6) Head-to-head goals scored 7) Head-to-head away goals scored; 8) Extra match or series of matches 9) Goal difference (series of matches) 10) Goals scored (series of matches) 11) Penalty shoot-out (extra match or series of matches)
(C) Champions; (O) Play-off winners; (P) Promoted

== Results ==
Home \ Away	ADO	ALM	CAM	DBO	DOR	EIN	EMM	GRA	HEL	JAJ	JAZ	JPS	JUT	MVV	RKC	RJC	TOP	VIT	VVV	WIL
ADO Den Haag		2–1	1–2	2–1	3–0	4–0	2–1	3–2	2–0	4–2	1–4	1–2	1–0	3–0	5–1	4–0	5–1	0–0	1–0	5–1
Almere City	1–0		1–1	1–2	4–1	5–0	4–2	2–0	0–1	3–2	1–3	2–4	4–0	4–0	2–2	1–2	3–2	2–2	3–0	0–1
Cambuur	2–0	3–2		2–1	1–1	2–1	3–2	2–0	0–0	4–1	3–4	5–3	1–0	4–0	1–1	1–1	1–0	2–1	3–1	2–2
Den Bosch	1–3	5–2	1–1		3–3	2–1	1–1	1–2	1–0	2–0	2–3	1–0	1–1	1–2	2–2	2–2	5–2	2–0	0–1	2–1
Dordrecht	1–0	0–1	1–0	3–2		3–4	1–0	1–1	3–0	0–1	1–1	1–2	1–2	1–1	1–2	0–3	2–2	1–1	2–0	1–2
Eindhoven	0–1	3–2	3–3	1–3	2–2		1–0	2–2	1–0	2–1	3–2	4–0	1–0	5–0	1–0	1–3	3–4	0–4	0–1	0–2
Emmen	0–1	1–4	2–4	3–1	2–0	6–0		1–0	4–1	0–0	4–2	2–3	1–0	2–1	2–2	1–1	1–1	2–4	2–2	0–3
De Graafschap	1–2	3–2	3–1	1–1	2–1	2–0	2–3		3–1	4–0	5–0	3–2	1–0	0–1	2–4	2–3	1–1	1–4	3–2	1–1
Helmond Sport	1–3	2–1	0–1	2–0	1–2	1–0	2–0	0–0		2–1	4–2	2–3	2–1	2–4	2–2	1–3	1–1	2–2	2–0	2–2
Jong Ajax	1–3	0–2	1–2	3–2	0–0	1–3	0–1	2–2	5–1		4–1	2–2	0–2	0–0	0–2	2–2	1–2	2–0	2–4	2–1
Jong AZ	0–4	3–4	0–1	2–2	1–2	0–2	2–3	1–3	2–0	1–2		0–2	1–4	1–1	2–3	2–0	0–1	4–0	0–2	4–0
Jong PSV	0–3	2–3	3–2	3–0	1–1	1–2	3–1	1–2	4–0	0–1	1–0		3–3	2–2	3–1	0–1	2–0	0–2	1–0	2–1
Jong FC Utrecht	2–2	2–3	2–4	3–2	3–1	3–0	1–2	2–3	1–0	4–3	0–0	5–3		3–1	2–0	1–3	0–0	0–3	2–2	1–1
MVV Maastricht	3–4	1–1	0–1	2–4	0–1	3–1	1–0	3–3	0–0	2–1	1–3	2–1	2–2		1–3	0–0	0–2	3–2	2–1	0–5
RKC Waalwijk	1–3	2–0	4–2	2–3	1–1	2–1	5–0	1–4	1–1	2–1	2–1	4–1	2–2	1–0		1–2	2–0	1–1	1–2	2–3
Roda JC Kerkrade	0–3	2–0	1–1	6–0	1–2	0–0	2–2	1–0	1–1	3–3	2–3	0–2	1–1	2–0	1–4		1–2	0–1	2–2	0–1
TOP Oss	3–4	1–2	1–2	4–2	0–3	2–1	4–0	2–3	0–3	1–1	0–3	1–1	3–1	4–0	0–0	1–2		1–2	2–1	1–3
Vitesse	2–1	1–3	0–4	1–2	1–2	1–1	3–3	1–2	3–1	6–1	2–0	3–1	2–0	0–0	2–1	2–2	0–0		2–2	1–2
VVV-Venlo	0–3	3–1	3–0	0–1	3–1	1–0	4–0	3–3	2–1	0–1	1–3	0–2	0–1	1–0	0–3	3–1	1–1	1–2		0–2
Willem II	0–1	2–1	0–1	1–1	2–0	0–1	1–1	0–2	1–0	1–0	3–0	1–0	2–1	2–2	2–1	1–2	1–1	3–0	2–1	

Source: Flashscore
Legend: Blue = home team win; Yellow = draw; Red = away team win.

== Play-offs ==
All times Central European Summer Time (UTC+2)

=== Promotion/relegation play-offs ===
==== Bracket ====
First round
6	RKC Waalwijk (p)	1	1	2 (3)
8	Roda JC Kerkrade	1	1	2 (1)
5	Almere City	3	3	6
9	Den Bosch	2	0	2

Quarterfinals
3	Willem II	1	1	2
6	RKC Waalwijk	0	1	1
4	De Graafschap	1	2	3
5	Almere City	3	2	5

Semifinal
3	Willem II	1	2	3
5	Almere City	0	0	0

Final
16	Volendam	2	1	3 (4)
3	Willem II (p)	1	2	3 (5)

==== First round ====
28 April 2026
18:45

Roda JC Kerkrade	1–1	RKC Waalwijk
Kalinauskas 90+5'		Cleonise 51'

Parkstad Limburg Stadion, Kerkrade
1 May 2026
20:00

RKC Waalwijk	1–1 (a.e.t.)	Roda JC Kerkrade
Uneken 90+7'		Van den Hurk 52'
Penalties
Van Kaam (penalty scored); Van Eijma (penalty scored); Van Gelderen (penalty scored)	3–1	(penalty missed) Paulissen; (penalty scored) Déom; (penalty missed) Kalinauskas; (penalty missed) Beerten

Mandemakers Stadion, Waalwijk

2–2 on aggregate. RKC Waalwijk won 3–1 on penalties.

29 April 2026
18:45

Den Bosch	2–3	Almere City
Grach 16'; Monzialo 44'		Jacobs 57'; Druijf 65'; Dors 88'

De Vliert, 's-Hertogenbosch
2 May 2026
14:00

Almere City	3–0	Den Bosch
Dors 41'; Druijf 82'; Rijkhoff 89'

Yanmar Stadion, Almere

Almere City won 6–2 on aggregate.

==== Quarterfinals ====
5 May 2026
18:45

RKC Waalwijk	0–1	Willem II
		Roemeratoe 63' (o.g.)

Mandemakers Stadion, Waalwijk
9 May 2026
16:30

Willem II	1–1	RKC Waalwijk
El Allouchi 46'		Boëtius 59'

Koning Willem II Stadion, Tilburg

Willem II won 2−1 on aggregate.

6 May 2026
18:45

Almere City	3–1	De Graafschap
Poku 32', 77'; Dors 58'		De Jong 45+2'

Yanmar Stadion, Almere
9 May 2026
20:00

De Graafschap	2–2	Almere City
Besselink 48'; Kwint 90'		Druijf 36'; De Haan 62'

De Vijverberg, Doetinchem

Almere City won 5−3 on aggregate.

==== Semifinal ====
13 May 2026
20:00

Almere City	0–1	Willem II
		Bamba 32'

Yanmar Stadion, Almere
16 May 2026
20:00

Willem II	2–0	Almere City
Van Aalst 60'; Et Taibi 85'

Koning Willem II Stadion, Tilburg

Willem II won 3−0 on aggregate.

==== Final ====
20 May 2026
18:45

Willem II	1−2	Volendam
Doodeman 54'		Ould-Chikh 13'; Veerman 18'

Koning Willem II Stadion, Tilburg
Referee: Jeroen Manschot
23 May 2026
16:30

Volendam	1−2 (a.e.t.)	Willem II
Leliendal 40'		Baartmans 8'; Stam 17'
Penalties
Mühren (penalty scored); Bukala (penalty missed); Pauwels (penalty scored); Kuwas (penalty scored); Leliendal (penalty scored)	4−5	(penalty scored) Haen; (penalty scored) Hoogma; (penalty scored) Doodeman; (penalty scored) Culum; (penalty scored) Didillon-Hödl

Kras Stadion, Volendam

3−3 on aggregate. Willem II won 5–4 on penalties.

== Season statistics ==
=== Top scorers ===
Rank	Player	Club	Goals
1	(Netherlands) Romano Postema	Emmen	24
2	(Netherlands) Reuven Niemeijer	De Graafschap	20
3	(Netherlands) Devin Haen	Willem II	18
4	(Netherlands) Julian Rijkhoff	Almere City	17
5	(Republic of the Congo) Kevin Monzialo	Den Bosch	16
5	(Curaçao) Anthony van den Hurk	Roda JC Kerkrade	16
7	(Netherlands) Dean Zandbergen	VVV-Venlo	15
8	(Netherlands) Jesper Uneken	RKC Waalwijk	14
8	(Netherlands) Robin van Duiven	Jong PSV	14
10	(Netherlands) Tim van der Leij	RKC Waalwijk	13

=== Discipline ===
- Most yellow cards: 9
  - (Belgium) Wout Coomans (MVV Maastricht)
  - (Germany) Ricardo-Felipe Schwarz (Vitesse)
  - (Netherlands) Milan de Haan (Almere City)
  - (Netherlands) Mauresmo Hinoke (TOP Oss)
- Most red cards: 1
  - 32 players
