= Robin Peter =

German football manager (born 1987)

Personal information
- Date of birth: 31 July 1987 (age 39)
- Place of birth: Erlabrunn, East Germany

Managerial career
- Years: Team
- 2024–2025: FC Emmen
- 2025–2026: ADO Den Haag

Robin Peter (born 31 July 1987) is a German professional football manager. He coached in the youth teams of RB Leipzig from 2011 to 2023, and had his first senior experience with FC Emmen in the Eerste Divisie in the Netherlands in 2024–25. With ADO Den Haag, he won the 2025–26 Eerste Divisie, but was dismissed after a poor start to the Eredivisie season.

== Career ==
=== Early career ===
Peter was born in Erlabrunn (Breitenbrunn) in the state of Saxony. He was a coach in the youth teams of RB Leipzig from 2011 to 2023. He passed his football coaching course in 2021, and after winning the Saxony Cup and coming 6th in the Bundesliga with the under-17 team in 2021–22, his contract was extended to 2024. He was also an assistant to the Germany under-18 team.

On 11 June 2024, Peter was given his first senior coaching job, on a one-year deal at FC Emmen in the Eerste Divisie in the Netherlands. His debut on 9 August was a 2–1 home loss to FC Dordrecht. On 25 January 2025, with the team 9th and without a win for two months, he was sacked; assistant Alfons Arts succeeded him for the rest of the season.

On 21 March 2025, Belgian Pro League side Cercle Brugge appointed Jimmy De Wulf as head coach and Peter as assistant.

=== ADO Den Haag ===
On 14 July 2025, Peter was appointed head coach of ADO Den Haag on a two-year contract, returning to the Eerste Divisie. On the first day of the 2025–26 season, his team won 5–1 home victory over relegated Willem II on 10 August and went to the top of the table. ADO held the lead from mid-October onwards without interruption, accruing 91 points across all matches played in calendar year 2025—the highest single-year total in the history of the Eerste Divisie, surpassing the record of 89 set by RKC Waalwijk in 1987.

After five consecutive defeats in December and January, the club reasserted themselves and on 17 March 2026 confirmed promotion to the Eredivisie with a 1–0 home win over Jong Utrecht, ending five years in the second tier. It was the earliest calendar-date promotion in the history of the division, and in terms of rounds played—32 of 38—equalled the record set by NEC in the 2014–15 season. At 38 and 253 days, Peter was the second-youngest manager to win the Eerste Divisie title, behind Thijs Libregts, who had done so with Excelsior in 1979, aged 38 years and 151 days. The Swiss research bureau CIES ranked ADO as the most effective pressing team among 883 clubs across 56 competitions worldwide.

On 8 August 2026, Peter lost 2–0 away to AZ Alkmaar on his Eredivisie debut. He then put the club's training sessions behind closed doors due to a leak of their line-up. He was dismissed on 2 November with the team in 17th after winning once in 11 games; their one victory was a 2–1 home win over reigning champions PSV Eindhoven on 17 October. They were also eliminated from the first round of the KNVB Cup by fourth-tier Excelsior '31.

== Career statistics ==
As of match played 1 November 2026

Managerial record by team and tenure
Team	From	To	Record				
Team	From	To	P	W	D	L	Win %
FC Emmen	1 July 2024	25 January 2025	20	8	5	7	40.00
ADO Den Haag	14 July 2025	Present	51	30	6	15	58.82
Total			71	38	11	22	53.52

== Honours ==
ADO Den Haag

- Eerste Divisie: 2025–26
