= Edwin van Ankeren =

Dutch footballer (born 1968)

Personal information
- Date of birth: 13 August 1968 (age 58)
- Place of birth: Amsterdam, Netherlands
- Position: Striker

Youth career
- SV Lelystad '67

Senior career*
Years	Team	Apps	(Gls)
1985–1989	PEC Zwolle	91	(22)
1989–1991	Beveren	52	(19)
1991–1993	RWDM	49	(19)
1993–1994	PSV	19	(3)
1994–1996	Eendracht Aalst	41	(22)
1996–1999	Germinal Ekeren	69	(15)
1999–2000	Guingamp	33	(9)
2001	Viterbese	1	(0)
2001–2003	Odd Grenland	56	(24)
2004–2005	Tollnes	2	(1)
2005–2006	FC Omniworld	17	(2)
Total		430	(136)

International career
1986	Netherlands U-18	1	(0)

Managerial career
- 2004–2005: Tollnes (player/ass. coach)
- 2007–2016: Unicum
- 2012: Almere City (caretaker)
- * Club domestic league appearances and goals

Edwin van Ankeren (born 13 August 1968) is a Dutch retired footballer who played as a striker.

== Playing career ==
=== Club ===
A journeyman striker, Van Ankeren has played professionally in his native Holland as well as in Italy, France and Norway. He was, however, most successful during his spells with different clubs in Belgium. He only had one season with Dutch club PSV, whom he left for Eendracht Aalst in 1994.

He left Italian side Viterbese in March 2001 after only seven weeks, claiming the club did not pay his wages. After spells in Norway, van Ankeren returned to Holland in 2005 to join newly formed professional club FC Omniworld.

=== International ===
Van Ankeren played once for the Netherlands U18 team, in a game against Sweden in 1986.

== Managerial career ==
During his spell at Norwegian lower league side Tollnes BK, Van Ankeren already acted as player/assistant coach. In summer 2007, Van Ankeren started his career as full-time coach with Lelystad amateur side Unicum and shared his duties with Michel van Oostrum.

Van Ankeren was named caretaker manager of Almere City after the club disposed of Dick de Boer in September 2012.

== Personal life ==
In November 2015 van Ankeren started a cleaning company in Lelystad.

== Honours ==
Germinal Ekeren

- Belgian Cup: 1996–97
