= Uneken =

Uneken is a surname. Notable people with the surname include:

- Jesper Uneken (born 2004), Dutch footballer
- Lonneke Uneken (born 2000), Dutch racing cyclist
- Peter Uneken (born 1972), Dutch football manager
