= Nuijten =

Nuijten is a surname. Notable people with the surname include:

- Julien Nuijten (born 1988 or 1989), Dutch card player and cook
- Paul Nuijten (born 1992), Dutch football coach
