= Hennie Spijkerman =

Dutch football coach and former player (born 1950)

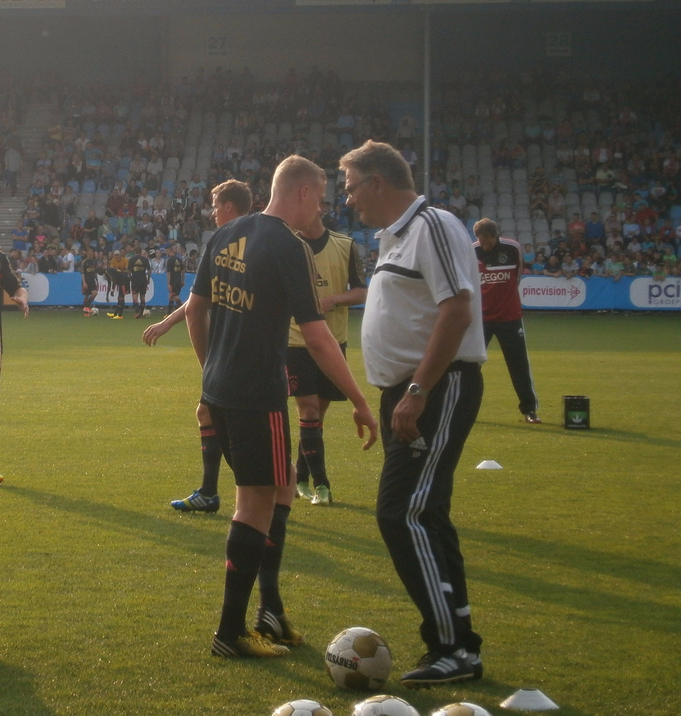

Personal information
- Full name: Hennie Spijkerman
- Date of birth: 28 October 1950 (age 76)
- Place of birth: Zwolle, Netherlands
- Height: 1.87 m (6 ft 2 in)
- Position: Goalkeeper

Team information
- Current team: FC Groningen (assistant manager)

Youth career
- 1957–1968: PEC Zwolle

Senior career*
Years	Team	Apps	(Gls)
1968–1969	PEC Zwolle	12	(0)
1969–1977	Go Ahead Eagles	94	(0)

Managerial career
- 1977–1978: Go Ahead Eagles (youth)
- 1978–1994: Go Ahead Eagles (assistant)
- 1994–1996: Rohda Raalte
- 1996–1998: SV Urk
- 1998–2000: VVV-Venlo
- 2000–2003: FC Emmen
- 2003–2006: FC Zwolle
- 2006–2008: Ajax (assistant)
- 2008–2010: Ajax (scout)
- 2010: HFC Haarlem
- 2010: Ajax (scout)
- 2010: Ajax Cape Town (director)
- 2011–2017: Ajax (assistant)
- 2018–: FC Groningen (assistant)
- * Club domestic league appearances and goals as of 28 February 2014 (UTC)

Hennie Spijkerman (born 28 October 1950 in Zwolle) is a Dutch football coach and former player who was most recently assistant manager to Marcel Keizer for Eredivisie side AFC Ajax.

During his playing career, he played as a goalkeeper for both PEC Zwolle and Go Ahead Eagles. Following his playing career he became the assistant manager for Go Ahead Eagles, and then manager for Rohda Raalte, SV Urk, VVV-Venlo, FC Emmen, PEC Zwolle and HFC Haarlem. He has served two terms as assistant manager for Ajax, and was briefly appointed as technical director of Ajax Cape Town in 2010.

== Club career ==
Hennie Spijkerman began his football career in his hometown of Zwolle, where he joined the youth ranks of local PEC Zwolle at the age of 6. He made his professional debut as a goalkeeper for the club during the 1968/69 season and went on to make 12 appearances for his home team. The following year saw Hennie Spijkerman join the Go Ahead Eagles in Deventer who were competing in the Dutch Eredivisie and had recently contested Celtic F.C. for the European Cup. He went on to play eight seasons for his new club before being appointed as assistant manager to Joop Brand for the same club following his retirement.

== Coaching career ==
Following his retirement in 1977, Hennie Spijkerman became the assistant manager for the Go Ahead Eagles, assisting Joop Brand, Jan Versleijen and Nico van Zoghel, before accepting a position as manager for Rohda Raalte in 1994, by which time he had been active with Go Ahead Eagles for 25 years both as a player and coach. Two years later he became the manager of SV Urk, a position he filled for two seasons before taking over as manager of VVV-Venlo. In 2000 Spijkerman left Venlo to become the new manager of FC Emmen, managing them for three years before moving back to the club where it all started FC Zwolle on 8 October 2003. Managing Zwolle for three seasons, Spijkerman left the club following disputes and differences with a supporters group, taking a position as assistant manager to Henk ten Cate at AFC Ajax in Amsterdam. Spijkerman then remained the assistant manager at the club under Adrie Koster following the departure of Henk ten Cate, he however then took a scouting position with the club following the arrival of Marco van Basten as the new manager at Ajax. In 2010 Hennie Spijkerman took over as the new manager of HFC Haarlem a partner club of Ajax, Haarlem however filed for bankruptcy that same year, upon which Hennie Spijkerman filled a vacancy as technical director at Ajax Cape Town, Ajax' satellite club in South Africa. In 2011 Hennie Spijkerman resumed his position as assistant manager for Ajax Amsterdam under newly appointed manager Frank de Boer. The club went on to win four consecutive national titles under the new management. He and fellow assistant Dennis Bergkamp were sacked from their roles in December 2017. Since 2018 Hennie Spijkerman is employed by FC Groningen as an assistant to head coach and former FC Groningen player Danny Buijs.

== Honours ==
=== Coach ===
Ajax

- Eredivisie (4): 2010–11, 2011–12, 2012–13, 2013–14
- KNVB Cup (1): 2006–07
- Johan Cruijff Shield (2): 2007, 2013
