= Kees Mijnders =

Dutch footballer

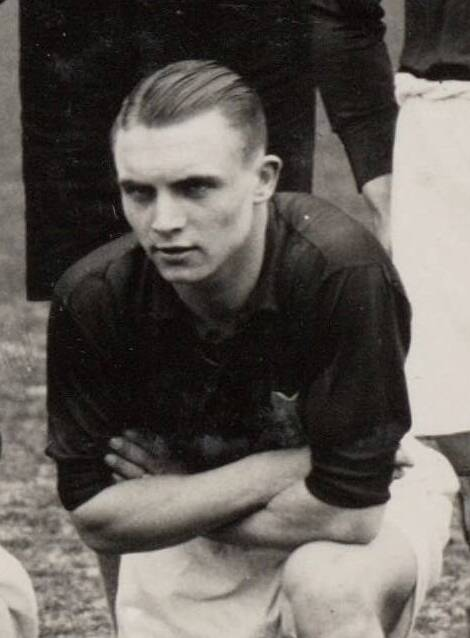
- Mijnders (1934)

Personal information
- Date of birth: 28 September 1912
- Place of birth: Eindhoven, Netherlands
- Date of death: 1 April 2002 (aged 89)
- Position: Forward

Senior career*
| Years | Team | Apps | (Gls) |
| 1927–1952 | DFC | | |

International career
| 1934–1938 | Netherlands | 7 | (0) |
- * Club domestic league appearances and goals

Cornelis Lambertus Mijnders (28 September 1912 – 1 April 2002) was a Dutch football forward who was selected for the Netherlands in the 1934 FIFA World Cup. He also played for DFC.
