= Demba van Leeuwen =

Dutch footballer (born 2000)

Personal information
- Full name: Demba Steven Camara van Leeuwen
- Date of birth: 19 October 2000 (age 26)
- Place of birth: Amsterdam, Netherlands
- Height: 1.85 m (6 ft 1 in)
- Position: Forward

Team information
- Current team: Elia Lythrodonta

Youth career
- 2014–2019: Zeeburgia
- 2019–2020: Dordrecht

Senior career*
Years	Team	Apps	(Gls)
2020–2021	APEA Akrotiri		
2021–	Elia Lythrodonta		

International career
2019–	Mali	1	(0)
- * Club domestic league appearances and goals as of 28 October 2019

Demba Steven Camara van Leeuwen (born 19 October 2000) is a professional footballer who plays as a forward for Cypriot club Elia Lythrodonta. Born in the Netherlands, van Leeuwen represents the Mali national football team.

== Career ==
In September 2020, van Leeuwen joined Cypriot side APEA Akrotiri.

== International career ==
Van Leeuwen was born in the Netherlands to a Malian father and Dutch mother. He made his debut for the Mali national football team in a friendly 1–2 loss over South Africa on 13 October 2019.
