= FC Dordrecht =

Association football club in the Netherlands

Dordrecht
- Full name: Football Club Dordrecht
- Nickname: Schapenkoppen (Sheep heads)
- Founded: 16 August 1883; 143 years ago
- Ground: Stadion Krommedijk
- Capacity: 4,235
- Chairman: Hans de Zeeuw
- Head coach: Paul Nuijten
- League: Eerste Divisie
- 2025–26: Eerste Divisie, 10th of 20
- Website: www.fcdordrecht.nl
| Home colours | Away colours |

Football Club Dordrecht, or simply FC Dordrecht (Dutch pronunciation: [ɛfˈseː ˈdɔrdrɛxt]) is a professional Dutch association football club based in Dordrecht, a city in the Western Netherlands, located in the province of South Holland. They currently compete in the Eerste Divisie, the second tier of the Dutch football league system.

Originally founded on 16 August 1883 as Dordrechtsche Cricket Club which later became Dordrechtse Football Club (DFC), it became a professional club in 1954 upon the introduction of professional football to the Netherlands. In 1972, the professional branch separated from the parent club and continued under the name FC Dordrecht, before becoming DS '79 in 1979. On 1 July 1991, the club merged with SV SVV from Schiedam to become SVV/Dordrecht'90, before becoming Dordrecht '90 the following year. Since 1994, the club has been called FC Dordrecht. A two time KNVB Cup winner, Dordrecht has spent most of its existence as a second-tier Eerste Divisie side, with short stints in the top-tier Eredivisie.

Since 1948, Dordrecht has played its home games at the Stadion Krommedijk (currently known as the Matchoholic Stadion for sponsorship reasons), which saw a major renovation in 1998–99. The stadium has a capacity of 4,235.

== History ==
=== Beginnings ===
Founded on 16 August 1883 as Dordrechtsche Cricket Club (DCC), the club branched out and added association football club to their club which changed its name to DCFC in 1891, before completely abandoning cricket in 1899 and continuing as DFC. It became a professional club in 1954 upon the introduction of professional football to the Netherlands. The next significant events were in 1972, at which time the professional branch of DFC was renamed FC Dordrecht, and in 1974 when the professionals and amateurs severed their ties.

Jimmy Hogan was a inside forward, with Bolton Wanderers. During a pre-season tour Bolton beat Dordrecht 10–0; Hogan vowed to return to Dordrecht in order to "teach those fellows how to play properly". In 1910, Hogan accepted a two-year contract at Dordrecht and set about improving the team in fitness and ball control, as well as implementing the Combination Game. Impressed by his methods, the Royal Dutch Football Association recruited Hogan to manage the Netherlands in a friendly against Germany in October 1910, which Hogan's side won 2–1.

Upon the expiry of his contract with Dordrecht in 1912, Hogan returned for a final season as a player at Bolton before returning to Vienna to coach the Austria national football team.

In 1914 DFC won their first Dutch Cup.

=== 1979–1990: DS '79 ===
In 1979, under the leadership of chairman and investor Nico de Vries, the organisation was professionalised and an attempt was also made to gain more supporters to the fanbase. This included a new name, DS '79 (Drechtsteden'79), referring to the Drechtsteden region. The club colours were also changed, and red-white colour scheme was replaced by a yellow-blue outfit. New players came to the club, including Huub Smeets who signed from the Los Angeles Aztecs, Wim Berends and Chris Bosse from the Sparta reserve team, and Harry van den Ham and Joop Oostdam from the reserves of FC Utrecht. The team became known as the "local heroes, and popularity grew and increasing interest in the games at Stadion Krommedijk. In January 1981, the most famous player in club history, Johan Cruyff, made three appearances for DS '79. These came at Stamford Bridge against Chelsea (4–2), at home against Ajax (2–1) and in Belgium against Charleroi (1–7).

In 1983, the team won the second-tier Eerste Divisie and as a result, DS '79 won promotion to the Eredivisie. The following season, DS'79 was led by the coaching duo Hans Dorjee and Joop van Daele, and suffered direct relegation to the Eerste Divisie.

At the end of the 1986–87 season, DS '79 won promotion again, this time via play-offs. The yellow-blues were then led by Simon Kistemaker, he neither could prevent the club from Dordrecht from relegating again at the end of the season.

Former player Epi Drost took over the position of head coach at the start of the 1989–90 season, but only managed to lead the team to a 19th and last place in the Eerste Divisie. New investor, Cees den Braven, became chairman in the club and changed the name of the club, its third name: Dordrecht '90. The outfit was also changed to a green jersey with white shorts. These were the colours of De Braven Sealants, the chairman's company. Margo Gerrits signed a contract as commercial manager at Dordrecht '90, making her the first female manager in professional football.

=== 1991–2001: Dordrecht '90 ===
The club just missed promotion to the Eredivisie in 1991. It was finally admitted when Dordrecht '90 surprisingly merged with neighbouring Schiedamse Voetbal Vereniging (SVV) of Schiedam and became SVV/Dordrecht '90. Under the new name, the club immediately returned to the highest level. Under the leadership of Dick Advocaat and Han Berger, the team reached fifteenth place in the league table. That year, the club played its only European matches in the UEFA Intertoto Cup, consisting only of a group stage against Hammarby IF from Sweden, AaB from Denmark and 1. FC Saarbrücken from Germany. The following year, Han Berger and Nico van Zoghel only reached last place in the table, meaning that SVV/Dordrecht '90 suffered another relegation.

After relegation, the club abandoned the 'SVV' and continued as Dordrecht '90. Van Zoghel remained as head coach and led the club to the Eerste Divisie championship at the end of the 1993–94 season with automatic promotion. Again, the Eredivisie was too big of a mouthful for the Dordrecht team, who again relegated directly. Chairman Cees den Braven resigned from the position and handed over the leadership of the club to former referee Frans Derks. Much success was not achieved in the following years, and the club slowly fell to the lower echelons of the Eerste Divisie. A small revival occurred at the end of the 1998–99 season, as Dordrecht '90 qualified for promotion play-offs through a period championship, despite only reaching a 14th place in the table, but did not find success there.

=== 2002–present: FC Dordrecht ===
==== Management changes ====
Finally in 2002, the club was renamed once again, to the name it bore from 1972 to 1979: FC Dordrecht, which remains the name today. For a number of years, Dordrecht was one of the clubs with the lowest average attendance of all Dutch professional teams.

When at the end of the 2002–03 season, FC Dordrecht ended bottom of the Eerste Divisie, Derks resigned from his position as chairman and Ad Heijsman took over. Heijsman was previously chairman of DFC, the club from which FC Dordrecht originated. Former player Marco Boogers was appointed technical director. After a number of lean years, Dordrecht slowly crept back up from the sporting trough. In 2009 and 2010, head coach Gert Kruys led the team to straight promotion play-off appearances.

With Marco Boogers as technical director of the club, a new direction was initiated. Partly due to the disappointing financial results, the budget for players decreased to €5.5 thousand. FC Dordrecht then began a partnership with Eredivisie club ADO Den Haag, who provided players on one-season loan agreements, including Tom Beugelsdijk, Giovanni Korte and Santy Hulst. Boogers also managed to sign talented players from other clubs, including Joris van Overeem, Marvin Peersman and Jafar Arias.

==== Eredivisie 2014–15 ====
On 18 May 2014, Dordrecht won promotion to the Eredivisie for the first time in 19 years, after a 3–1 win over Sparta Rotterdam in the second leg of the promotion play-off finals, after the first leg had ended in a 2–2 draw. Shortly afterwards, head coach Harry van den Ham announces that he would leave the club to join FC Utrecht's managing staff. In the Eredivisie, Dordrecht won their first match against SC Heerenveen, but suffered relegation in the last matchday after Go Ahead Eagles won the away match against Feyenoord. Chairman Ad Heijsman stepped down at the end of March 2015, and supermarket manager Cees van der Poel took over. After relegation of 2015, almost all regular starters had left. An almost completely new team was brought in, including talented players from other Dutch clubs such as Alvin Daniels, Jeroen Lumu and Jafar Arias, but experience was also gained in the form of Geert Arend Roorda.

==== Eerste Divisie since 2015 ====
Back in the Eerste Divisie for the 2015–16 season, the club finished in a disappointing 14th place. The following season, a whole new squad was put together after the departure of many players. Halfway through the season, it became clear that it could be an even more disappointing year than the last. Dordrecht was at the bottom of the league and faced the risk of relegation to the third-tier Tweede Divisie, as this was possible in the 2016–17 season unlike before. Just before the end of the season, there was a matchup between the bottom two clubs in Achilles '29 and Dordrecht, which ended in a 2–2 draw, leaving the latter in 19th place and safe from relegation. Achilles '29 were later deducted points were for their financial problems, so that Dordrecht was finally safe and could continue their professional football operations.

A large number of players were signed again ahead of the 2017–18 season, and it soon became apparent that Dordrecht would bounce back from a disappointing previous season. The club did not play well in the first half of the season, but after the winter break, the team accomplished a strong winning streak. This ensured that Dordrecht became period champion on 12 March 2018 after a 1–0 win over RKC Waalwijk. Thereby, the club qualified for the promotion play-offs for the Eredivisie. In the play-offs. Dordrecht faced SC Cambuur in the first round. In the home game, they lost 1–4 loss, but in the return, Dordrecht put down a strong performance and ended up winning 1–4 in Leeuwarden to eventually advance after the penalty shootout. Sparta Rotterdam awaited in the semi-finals of the play-offs. The first game at home was lost 1–2, and in the return match at Het Kasteel, Dordrecht were up 0–2 in the first half; enough to reach the final, but lost their lead in the second half as the match ended 2–2. This ended their promotion run and Dordrecht remained in the second tier.

The club introduced a new policy of signing players on longer contracts ahead of the 2018–19 season, which meant that other clubs would have to put down larger transfer fees to convince Dordrecht to sell. However, like the previous season, Dordrecht started the competition poorly and were in last place in mid-November. As a result, head coach Gérard de Nooijer was fired. After assistant Scott Calderwood took over as caretaker until the winter break, and subsequently left the club, Cláudio Braga was appointed the new head coach. Dordrecht also entered into partnerships with Feyenoord and English club Norwich City. In the winter break, the squad received a quality boost with the arrival of Joël Zwarts, Crysencio Summerville and Jari Schuurman, among others. The latter even signed a three-year permanent contract with the Schapekoppen. Under the new coach and with a squad strengthened by new loanees, Dordrecht performed better in the second half of the season, among others beating eventual champions FC Twente. Dordrecht finished the competition in seventeenth place and started the following season with a number of new loanees on the books.

== Honours ==
=== League ===
- KNVB Cup
  - Winners (2): 1914, 1932
  - Runners-up (2): 1913, 1943
- Eerste Divisie
  - Winners (2): 1982–83, 1993–94
  - Play-off promotion (2): 1986–87, 2013–14

== Domestic results ==
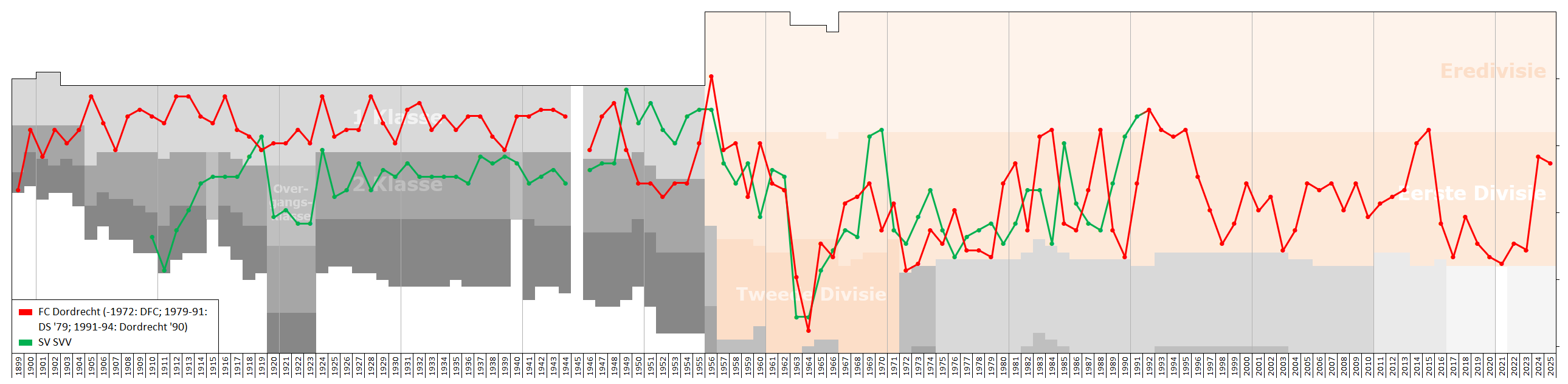
Historical chart of league performance

Below is a table with FC Dordrecht's domestic results since the introduction of professional football in 1956.

Domestic Results since 1956
| Domestic league | League result | Qualification to | KNVB Cup season | Cup result |
|---|---|---|---|---|
| 2022–23 Eerste Divisie | 18th | – | 2022–23 | First round |
| 2021–22 Eerste Divisie | 17th | – | 2021–22 | First round |
| 2020–21 Eerste Divisie | 20th | – | 2020–21 | First round |
| 2019–20 Eerste Divisie | 19th | – | 2019–20 | Second round |
| 2018–19 Eerste Divisie | 17th | – | 2018–19 | First round |
| 2017–18 Eerste Divisie | 13th | promotion/relegation play-offs: no promotion | 2017–18 | first round |
| 2016–17 Eerste Divisie | 19th | – | 2016–17 | first round |
| 2015–16 Eerste Divisie | 14th | – | 2015–16 | third round |
| 2014–15 Eredivisie | 18th | Eerste Divisie (relegation) | 2014–15 | third round |
| 2013–14 Eerste Divisie | 2nd | Eredivisie (winning promotion/releg. play-offs) | 2013–14 | second round |
| 2012–13 Eerste Divisie | 9th | promotion/relegation play-offs: no promotion | 2012–13 | round of 16 |
| 2011–12 Eerste Divisie | 10th | – | 2011–12 | third round |
| 2010–11 Eerste Divisie | 11th | – | 2010–11 | fourth round |
| 2009–10 Eerste Divisie | 13th | – | 2009–10 | third round |
| 2008–09 Eerste Divisie | 8th | promotion/relegation play-offs: no promotion | 2008–09 | round of 16 |
| 2007–08 Eerste Divisie | 12th | – | 2007–08 | quarter-final |
| 2006–07 Eerste Divisie | 6th | promotion/relegation play-offs: no promotion | 2006–07 | second round |
| 2005–06 Eerste Divisie | 9th | – | 2005–06 | third round |
| 2004–05 Eerste Divisie | 8th | – | 2004–05 | round of 16 |
| 2003–04 Eerste Divisie | 15th | – | 2003–04 | first round |
| 2002–03 Eerste Divisie | 18th | – | 2002–03 | second round |
| 2001–02 Eerste Divisie | 10th | – | 2001–02 | third round |
| 2000–01 Eerste Divisie | 12th | – | 2000–01 | second round |
| 1999–2000 Eerste Divisie | 8th | – | 1999–2000 | quarter-final |
| 1998–99 Eerste Divisie | 14th | promotion/relegation play-offs: no promotion | 1998–99 | group stage |
| 1997–98 Eerste Divisie | 17th | – | 1997–98 | second round |
| 1996–97 Eerste Divisie | 12th | – | 1996–97 | group stage |
| 1995–96 Eerste Divisie | 7th | – | 1995–96 | second round |
| 1994–95 Eredivisie | 18th | Eerste Divisie (relegation) | 1994–95 | round of 16 |
| 1993–94 Eerste Divisie | 1st | Eredivisie (promotion) | 1993–94 | round of 16 |
| 1992–93 Eredivisie | 18th | Eerste Divisie (relegation) | 1992–93 | third round |
| 1991–92 Eredivisie | 15th | – | 1991–92 | second round |
| 1990–91 Eerste Divisie (as Dordrecht '90); 1990–91 Eredivisie (as SVV) | 8th 16th | Merger (and surviving prom./releg. play-offs) | 1990–91 | quarter-final round of 16 |
| 1989–90 Eerste Divisie as DS '79......and SVV | 19th 1st | – Eredivisie (promotion) | 1989–90 | first round round of 16 |
| 1988–89 Eerste Divisie as DS '79......and SVV | 15th 8th | – | 1988–89 | first round |
| 1987–88 Eredivisie (as DS '79); 1987–88 Eerste Divisie (as SVV) | 18th 15th | Eerste Divisie (relegation) – | 1987–88 | round of 16 |
| 1986–87 Eerste Divisie | 9th 14th | Eredivisie (winning promotion competition) – | 1986–87 | quarter-final second round |
| 1985–86 Eerste Divisie as DS '79......and SVV | 15th 11th | – | 1985–86 | second round |
| 1984–85 Eerste Divisie as DS '79......and SVV | 14th 12th | – | 1984–85 | first round |
| 1983–84 Eredivisie (as DS '79); 1983–84 Eerste Divisie (as SVV) | 18th 17th | Eerste Divisie (relegation) – | 1983–84 | round of 16 first round |
| 1982–83 Eerste Divisie as DS '79......and SVV | 1st 9th | Eredivisie (promotion) – | 1982–83 | first round |
| 1981–82 Eerste Divisie as DS '79......and SVV | 15th 9th | – | 1981–82 | quarter-final first round |
| 1980–81 Eerste Divisie as DS '79......and SVV | 5th 14th | promotion competition: no promotion – | 1980–81 | second round |
| 1979–80 Eerste Divisie as DS '79......and SVV | 8th 17th | – | 1979–80 | round of 16 second round |
| 1978–79 Eerste Divisie as FC Dordrecht......and SVV | 19th 14th | – | 1978–79 | second round first round |
| 1977–78 Eerste Divisie as FC Dordrecht......and SVV | 18th 15th | – | 1977–78 | first round second round |
| 1976–77 Eerste Divisie as FC Dordrecht......and SVV | 18th 16th | – | 1976–77 | second round |
| 1975–76 Eerste Divisie as FC Dordrecht......and SVV | 12th 19th | – | 1975–76 | second round round of 16 |
| 1974–75 Eerste Divisie as FC Dordrecht......and SVV | 17th 15th | – | 1974–75 | second round first round |
| 1973–74 Eerste Divisie as FC Dordrecht......and SVV | 15th 9th | – | 1973–74 | first round |
| 1972–73 Eerste Divisie as FC Dordrecht......and SVV | 20th 13th | – | 1972–73 | first round round of 16 |
| 1971–72 Eerste Divisie as DFC......and SVV | 21st 17th | – | 1971–72 | did not participate first round |
| 1970–71 Eerste Divisie as DFC......and SVV | 11th 15th | – | 1970–71 | first round round of 16 |
| 1969–70 Eerste Divisie (as DFC); 1969–70 Eredivisie (as SVV) | 15th 18th | – Eerste Divisie (relegation) | 1969–70 | first round |
| 1968–69 Eerste Divisie as DFC......and SVV | 8th 1st | – Eredivisie (promotion) | 1968–69 | second round |
| 1967–68 Eerste Divisie as DFC......and SVV | 10th 16th | – | 1967–68 | group stage |
| 1966–67 Eerste Divisie as DFC......and SVV | 11th 15th | – | 1966–67 | quarter-final did not participate |
| 1965–66 Tweede Divisie as DFC......and SVV | 3rd 2nd | Eerste Divisie (promotion) | 1965–66 | group stage |
| 1964–65 Tweede Divisie as DFC......and SVV | 1st (group B); 5th (group B) | promotion play-off: no promotion – | 1964–65 | first round quarter final |
| 1963–64 Tweede Divisie as DFC......and SVV | 14th (group B); 12th (group B) | – | 1963–64 | first round |
| 1962–63 Tweede Divisie as DFC......and SVV | 6th (group B); 12th (group B) | – | 1962–63 | round of 16 first round |
| 1961–62 Eerste Divisie as DFC......and SVV | 9th (group A); 7th (group A) | Tweede Divisie (relegation); Tweede Divisie (losing relegation play-off) | 1961–62 | ? |
| 1960–61 Eerste Divisie as DFC......and SVV | 8th (group A); 6th (group B) | – | 1960–61 | ? |
| 1959–60 Eerste Divisie as DFC......and SVV | 2nd (group B); 13th (group A) | promotion competition: no promotion – | not held | not held |
| 1958–59 Eerste Divisie as DFC......and SVV | 10th (group A); 5th (group A) | – | 1958–59 | ? |
| 1957–58 Eerste Divisie as DFC......and SVV | 2nd (group A); 8th (group A) | – (losing group A championship play-off) – | 1957–58 | ? |
| 1956–57 Eerste Divisie as DFC......and SVV | 3rd (group B); 5th (group A) | – | 1956–57 | ? |

== Club officials ==
| Position | Staff |
|---|---|
| Chairman & Chief Executive Officer | (Netherlands) Hans de Zeeuw |
| Technical director | (Netherlands) Sjoerd Ars |
| Head coach | (Netherlands) Paul Nuijten |
| Assistant coach | (Netherlands) Pascal Bosschaart |
| Goalkeeper coach | (Netherlands) Peter den Otter |
| Caregiver & Condition/Recovery Trainer | (Germany) Lennart Mahn |
| Exercise Physiologist | (Sweden) Ajey Raghosing |
| Physiotherapist | (Netherlands) Paul Amakodo |
| Team Manager | (Netherlands) Soufiane Haddad |

== Current squad ==
As of 17 September 2026

Note: Flags indicate national team as defined under FIFA eligibility rules; some limited exceptions apply. Players may hold more than one non-FIFA nationality.

| No. | Pos. | Nation | Player |
|---|---|---|---|
| 1 | GK | NED | Finn Oldenstam |
| 2 | DF | NED | Adil Lechkar |
| 3 | DF | NED | Stan Henderikx (on loan from Excelsior Rotterdam) |
| 4 | DF | SUR | Jaden Pinas |
| 5 | DF | BEL | Beni Mpanzu |
| 6 | MF | ITA | Lorenzo Riccio |
| 7 | FW | NED | Nick Venema |
| 8 | MF | NED | Senne Vugts |
| 9 | FW | NED | Joey de Bie |
| 10 | MF | MAR | Ayoub Ouarghi (on loan from Feyenoord) |
| 11 | FW | URU | Nicolás Rossi |
| 13 | GK | NED | Dean Hogervorst |
| 14 | MF | KOR | Bae Seung-gyun (on loan from Feyenoord) |
| 15 | DF | GAB | Yannis M'Bemba |
| 16 | FW | ITA | Lucas Román |
| 17 | FW | TOG | Yunus Younous |

| No. | Pos. | Nation | Player |
|---|---|---|---|
| 18 | FW | NED | Robin van Asten |
| 21 | MF | EST | Martin Vetkal |
| 22 | DF | NED | Jurre van Aken |
| 23 | DF | NED | Lucas Woudenberg |
| 27 | MF | NED | Dion Van Zanten |
| 28 | GK | NED | Tim Coremans |
| 29 | FW | BOE | Ninho Felicia |
| 34 | FW | NED | Mohamed Kessrioui |
| 44 | DF | NED | Björn Hardley |
| 45 | MF | ALG | Sidali Bouraba |
| 51 | DF | NED | Lucas Gardenier (on loan from Feyenoord) |
| 77 | FW | LAT | Dario Šits (on loan from Parma) |
| 98 | FW | AUT | Noah Bischof |
| — | GK | NED | Thomas Artic |
| — | GK | NED | Calvin Raatsie |
| — | GK | NED | Yanick van Osch |

== Players ==
=== National team players ===
The following players were called up to represent their national teams in international football and received caps during their tenure with FC Dordrecht:

- Afghanistan
  - (Afghanistan) Omran Haydary (2018–2019)
  Bonaire
  - (Bonaire) **Ninho Felicia (2024–present)**
  Cape Verde
  - (Cape Verde) Jeffry Fortes (2008–2009; 2012–2016)
  - (Cape Verde) Josimar Lima (2011–2014; 2014–2016)
  - (Cape Verde) Mailson Lima (2017–2018)
  - (Cape Verde) Rui Monteiro (1998–2000; 2004–2006)
  - (Cape Verde) Guy Ramos (2005–2011)
  - (Cape Verde) Toni Varela (2013–2014)
  Curaçao
  - (Curaçao) Kemy Agustien (2016)
  - (Curaçao) Trevor Doornbusch (2023–2024)
  - (Curaçao) Brutil Hosé (2003–2004) (Note: Brutil Hosé represented Netherlands Antilles internationally, prior to the countries dissolution in 2010, with Curaçao considered by both UEFA and FIFA as the only inherit successor to the national team of former Netherlands Antilles.)
  - (Curaçao) Rangelo Janga (2015–2016)
  - (Curaçao) Rihairo Meulens (2008–2009; 2013–2015)
  Estonia
  - (Estonia) Rocco Robert Shein (2023–2025)
  - (Estonia) **Martin Vetkal (2025–present)**
- Gabon
  - (Gabon) **Yannis M'Bemba (2024–present)**
  Luxembourg
  - (Luxembourg) Mica Pinto (2026)
  Mali
  - (Mali) Demba van Leeuwen (2019–2020)
  Netherlands
  - (Netherlands) Reinier Beeuwkes (1903–1910)
  - (Netherlands) Arie Bijvoet (1910–1914)
  - (Netherlands) Piet Bouman (1918–1925)
  - (Netherlands) Nico Bouvy (1910–1913)
  - (Netherlands) Barend van Hemert (1911–1923)
  - (Netherlands) Jan Klijnjan (1962–1968; 1976–1979)
  - (Netherlands) Dirk Lotsij (1901–1914)
  - (Netherlands) Kees Mijnders (1927–1929)
  - (Netherlands) Piet Punt (1930–1946)
  - (Netherlands) Eef Ruisch (1923–1937)
  - (Netherlands) Dick Sigmond (1918–1925)
  - (Netherlands) Willy de Vos (1900–1910)
- New Zealand
  - (New Zealand) Raf de Gregorio (1998–2000)
  Nigeria
  - (Nigeria) William Troost-Ekong (2014–2015)
  Philippines
  - (Philippines) Jason de Jong (2011–2012)

- Players in bold actively play for FC Dordrecht and for their respective national teams. Years in brackets indicate careerspan with Dordrecht.

=== National team players by Confederation ===
Member associations are listed in order of most to least amount of current and former Dordrecht players represented Internationally

Total national team players by confederation
| Confederation | Total | (Nation) Association |
|---|---|---|
| AFC | 2 | Afghanistan (1), Philippines (1) |
| CAF | 9 | Cape Verde (6), Gabon (1), Mali (1), Nigeria (1) |
| CONCACAF | 6 | Curaçao (5), Bonaire (1) |
| CONMEBOL | 0 | |
| OFC | 1 | New Zealand (1) |
| UEFA | 15 | Netherlands (12), Estonia (2), Luxembourg (1) |

== Players in international tournaments ==
The following is a list of FC Dordrecht players who have competed in international tournaments, including the FIFA World Cup, Africa Cup of Nations, OFC Nations Cup and the Caribbean Cup. To this date no Dordrecht players have participated in the UEFA European Championship, CONCACAF Gold Cup, AFC Asian Cup, or the Copa América while playing for FC Dordrecht.

| Cup | Players |
|---|---|
| (Italy) 1934 FIFA World Cup | (Netherlands) Kees Mijnders |
| (France) 1938 FIFA World Cup | (Netherlands) Piet Punt |
| (French Polynesia) 2000 OFC Nations Cup | (New Zealand) Raf de Gregorio |
| (South Africa) 2013 Africa Cup of Nations | (Cape Verde) Josimar Lima |
| (Jamaica) 2014 Caribbean Cup | (Curaçao) Rihairo Meulens |
| (Equatorial Guinea) 2015 Africa Cup of Nations | (Cape Verde) Jeffry Fortes |
