= Piet Punt =

Dutch footballer

Personal information
- Full name: Pieter Punt
- Date of birth: 6 February 1909
- Place of birth: Fijnaart, Netherlands
- Date of death: 5 July 1973 (aged 64)
- Position: Defender

Senior career*
Years	Team	Apps	(Gls)
- DFC

International career
1937	Netherlands	1	(0)
- * Club domestic league appearances and goals

Pieter Punt (6 February 1909 – 5 July 1973) was a Dutch football defender who was part of the Netherlands team in the 1938 FIFA World Cup. He also played for DFC.
