= Azing Griever =

Dutch footballer and manager

Personal information
- Date of birth: 21 July 1945 (age 81)
- Place of birth: Noordbroek, Netherlands
- Position: Goalkeeper

Youth career
- 1958-1964: ZNC

Senior career*
Years	Team	Apps	(Gls)
1964–1970	GVAV	14	(0)
1971–1975	Heerenveen	145	(1)
1975–1981	Groningen	186	(3)
Total		345	(4)

Managerial career
- 1983-1989: Germanicus
- 1989–1991: Hoogeveen
- 1992–1995: Heracles
- 1995-1998: Emmen
- 1998–1999: Veendam
- 1999: Emmen
- 1999–2000: Veendam
- 2004-2006: Aruba
- 2010-2011: Emmen
- * Club domestic league appearances and goals

Azing Griever (born 21 July 1945 in Noordbroek) is a Dutch football coach and former goalkeeper.

== Playing career ==
Born in Noordbroek, Griever started playing football at local amateur side ZNC and played professionally for GVAV, Heerenveen and Groningen.

== Managerial career ==
As a manager he took charge of the Aruba national football team in 2004. He worked in different positions for Emmen, the last one as technical manager in 2011. He also managed Veendam, Germanicus and Heracles.
