= Wout Coomans =

Belgian footballer (born 2001)

Personal information
- Date of birth: 9 December 2001 (age 24)
- Place of birth: Tessenderlo, Belgium
- Height: 1.88 m (6 ft 2 in)
- Position: Centre-back

Team information
- Current team: MVV
- Number: 4

Youth career
- Penarol Engsbergen
- 2008–2011: Sint-Truiden
- 2011–2022: Genk

Senior career*
Years	Team	Apps	(Gls)
2022	→ Thes (loan)	13	(0)
2022–2023	Thes	32	(1)
2023–	MVV	93	(1)

International career
2018	Belgium U17	2	(0)
2018–2019	Belgium U18	7	(0)
- * Club domestic league appearances and goals as of 28 April 2026

Wout Coomans (born 9 December 2001) is a Belgian professional footballer who plays as a centre-back for Eerste Divisie club MVV.

== Career ==
Coomans began playing for Penarol Engsbergen in Tessenderlo. At the age of seven, he tried out for Genk but chose to join Sint-Truiden. However, after three seasons there, he eventually moved to Genk in 2011. His initial contract with Genk was signed in January 2019. Despite grappling with injuries in the prior seasons, he secured a contract extension in March 2021, with an option for an additional year.

In November 2021, he participated in a friendly game against Oud-Heverlee Leuven, sharing the pitch with players like Mike Trésor, Joseph Paintsil, and Théo Bongonda. His next move came in January 2022 when Genk loaned him to Thes for the rest of the season due to Sam Vanaken's long-term injury. Following the loan, Thes secured Coomans on a permanent basis from Genk. Throughout his debut full season at Thes, he contributed in 32 out of 38 league matches. Prior to the conclusion of the 2022–23 season, Coomans announced his departure from Thes.

In June 2023, it was announced that Coomans had joined Dutch Eerste Divisie club MVV, signing a two-year deal with an optional third season. He made his official debut for the club on 13 August 2023, starting in a 3–1 victory against VVV-Venlo under the management of Maurice Verberne.

== Career statistics ==
As of match played 25 November 2025

Appearances and goals by club, season and competition
Club	Season	League			National cup		Other		Total	
Club	Season	Division	Apps	Goals	Apps	Goals	Apps	Goals	Apps	Goals
Thes (loan)	2021–22	National Division 1	13	0	0	0	—		13	0
Thes	2022–23	National Division 1	32	1	2	0	—		34	1
MVV	2023–24	Eerste Divisie	26	0	1	0	—		27	0
MVV	2024–25	Eerste Divisie	36	1	1	0	—		37	1
MVV	2025–26	Eerste Divisie	16	0	1	0	—		17	0
MVV	Total		78	1	3	0	—		81	1
Career total			123	2	5	0	0	0	128	2
