= Cas Peters =

Dutch footballer (born 1993)

Personal information
- Date of birth: 13 May 1993 (age 33)
- Place of birth: Oldenzaal, Netherlands
- Height: 1.83 m (6 ft 0 in)
- Positions: Forward; winger

Team information
- Current team: FSV Frankfurt
- Number: 10

Youth career
- KVV Losser
- 2004–2012: Twente

Senior career*
Years	Team	Apps	(Gls)
2012–2014	Twente	0	(0)
2012–2013	→ Go Ahead Eagles (loan)	30	(4)
2013–2014	→ Jong Twente	26	(7)
2014–2015	Emmen	36	(23)
2015	Nacional	0	(0)
2015–2016	De Graafschap	29	(5)
2016–2018	Emmen	74	(31)
2018–2019	Volendam	27	(7)
2019–2021	TOP Oss	44	(3)
2022–2023	FSV Frankfurt	32	(22)
2023–2025	Alemannia Aachen	7	(0)
2024–2025	→ FSV Frankfurt (loan)	42	(22)
2025–	FSV Frankfurt	35	(10)
- * Club domestic league appearances and goals as of 24 September 2026

Cas Peters (born 13 May 1993) is a Dutch professional footballer who plays as a forward or winger for German Regionalliga club FSV Frankfurt. He formerly played for FC Twente, Go Ahead Eagles, FC Emmen, Nacional, De Graafschap, TOP Oss, FSV Frankfurt and Alemannia Aachen.

== Career ==
=== Twente and loans ===
Peters played as a youth for KVV Losser and from there moved to the youth system of Eredivisie club FC Twente. In 2012, he joined second-tier Eerste Divisie club Go Ahead Eagles on a season-long loan. On 17 August 2012, he made his debut in professional football for the club from Deventer, and he finished the season with six goals in 39 appearances. After the loan deal expired, Peters returned to Twente where he would appear for the reserve team, Jong FC Twente, at that time also competing in the second-tier Eerste Divisie. There, he was a regular starter, scoring seven goals in 26 appearances.

=== FC Emmen, Nacional and de Graafschap ===
Ahead of the 2014–15 season, he moved to FC Emmen. With 23 goals, he finished the season second on the top goalscorer list that year, behind top scorer Sjoerd Ars.

In July 2015, Peters signed a four-year contract with Portuguese club Nacional, who had finished seventh in the Primeira Liga the previous season. The club signed him on a free transfer. A month after his arrival, Nacional informed Peters that he could stay, but under different financial conditions than initially agreed. He did not agree to a restructuring of his contract and left. Because he was not yet registered with the Liga Portuguesa de Futebol Profissional (LPFP) and had not made any official appearances for Nacional yet, he was able to look for a new club without any obstacles. Later that month, Peters reached an agreement on signing a two-year contract with De Graafschap, who had promoted to the Eredivisie in the previous season.

=== Return to FC Emmen ===
After one season, he returned to FC Emmen. He finished the 2017–18 season as the club's top goalscorer with seventeen goals. He managed to qualify for the promotion play-offs with Emmen at the end of the season. In the return game of the play-offs final against Sparta Rotterdam (3–1 win), he provided two assists and thus helped FC Emmen reach promotion to the Eredivisie.

=== FC Volendam, TOP Oss and FSV Frankfurt ===
On 29 August 2018, Peters signed a three-year contract with FC Volendam. A year later, in August 2019, he moved to division rivals TOP Oss on a two-year contract.

After half a year without a club Peters moved to FSV Frankfurt in January 2022 to help the club fight relegation from the fourth-tier Regionalliga Südwest.

=== Alemannia Aachen ===
On 28 June 2023, Peters moved to Alemannia Aachen.
