= Milan de Haan =

Dutch footballer (born 2003)

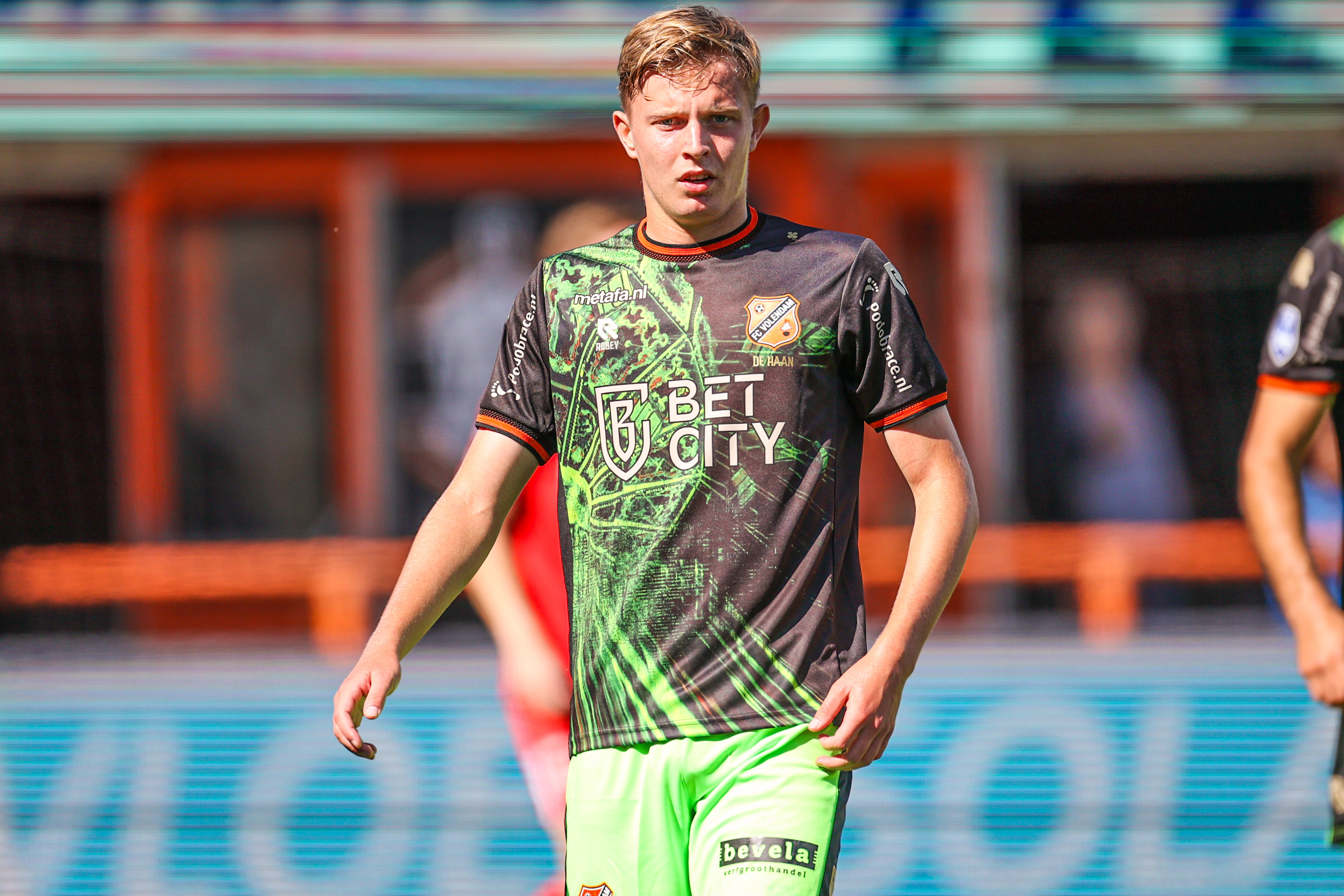
- De Haan with Volendam in 2023

Personal information
- Date of birth: 20 November 2003 (age 22)
- Place of birth: Monnickendam, Netherlands
- Height: 1.80 m (5 ft 11 in)
- Position: Midfielder

Team information
- Current team: Almere City
- Number: 8

Youth career
- 2008–2014: VV Monnickendam
- 2014–2020: RKAV Volendam
- 2020–2021: Volendam

Senior career*
Years	Team	Apps	(Gls)
2021–2023	Jong Volendam	57	(8)
2021–2025	Volendam	57	(6)
2025–	Almere City	35	(4)
- * Club domestic league appearances and goals as of 25 April 2026

Milan de Haan (born 20 November 2003) is a Dutch professional footballer who plays as a midfielder for Eerste Divisie club Almere City.

== Career ==
De Haan was born in Monnickendam and began playing for vv Monnickendam before moving to RKAV Volendam at the age of twelve. A childhood supporter of AFC Ajax, he joined the FC Volendam academy in 2020.

De Haan debuted for Jong Volendam in 2021 and made his first-team debut on 1 October 2021, starting in a 3–2 Eerste Divisie victory over Almere City.

Following the departure of head coach Wim Jonk in June 2023 and the appointment of Matthias Kohler, De Haan featured more regularly in the senior side. He signed a three-year professional contract in September 2023 and scored his first senior goal a month later against Excelsior.

De Haan made 30 league appearances in the 2024–25 season as Volendam won the Eerste Divisie title and secured promotion back to the top flight.

On 29 August 2025, de Haan signed a three-year contract with Almere City.

== Career statistics ==
As of match played 2 May 2025

Appearances and goals by club, season and competition
Club	Season	League			KNVB Cup		Other		Total	
Club	Season	Division	Apps	Goals	Apps	Goals	Apps	Goals	Apps	Goals
Jong Volendam	2021–22	Tweede Divisie	31	3	—		—		31	3
Jong Volendam	2022–23	Tweede Divisie	26	5	—		—		26	5
Jong Volendam	Total		57	8	—		—		57	8
Volendam	2021–22	Eerste Divisie	2	0	0	0	—		2	0
Volendam	2022–23	Eredivisie	0	0	0	0	—		0	0
Volendam	2023–24	Eredivisie	27	3	1	0	—		28	3
Volendam	2024–25	Eerste Divisie	26	3	1	0	—		27	3
Volendam	Total		55	6	2	0	—		57	6
Career total			102	14	2	0	0	0	104	14

== Honours ==
Volendam

- Eerste Divisie: 2024–25
