= Nico van Zoghel =

Dutch footballer (born 1975)

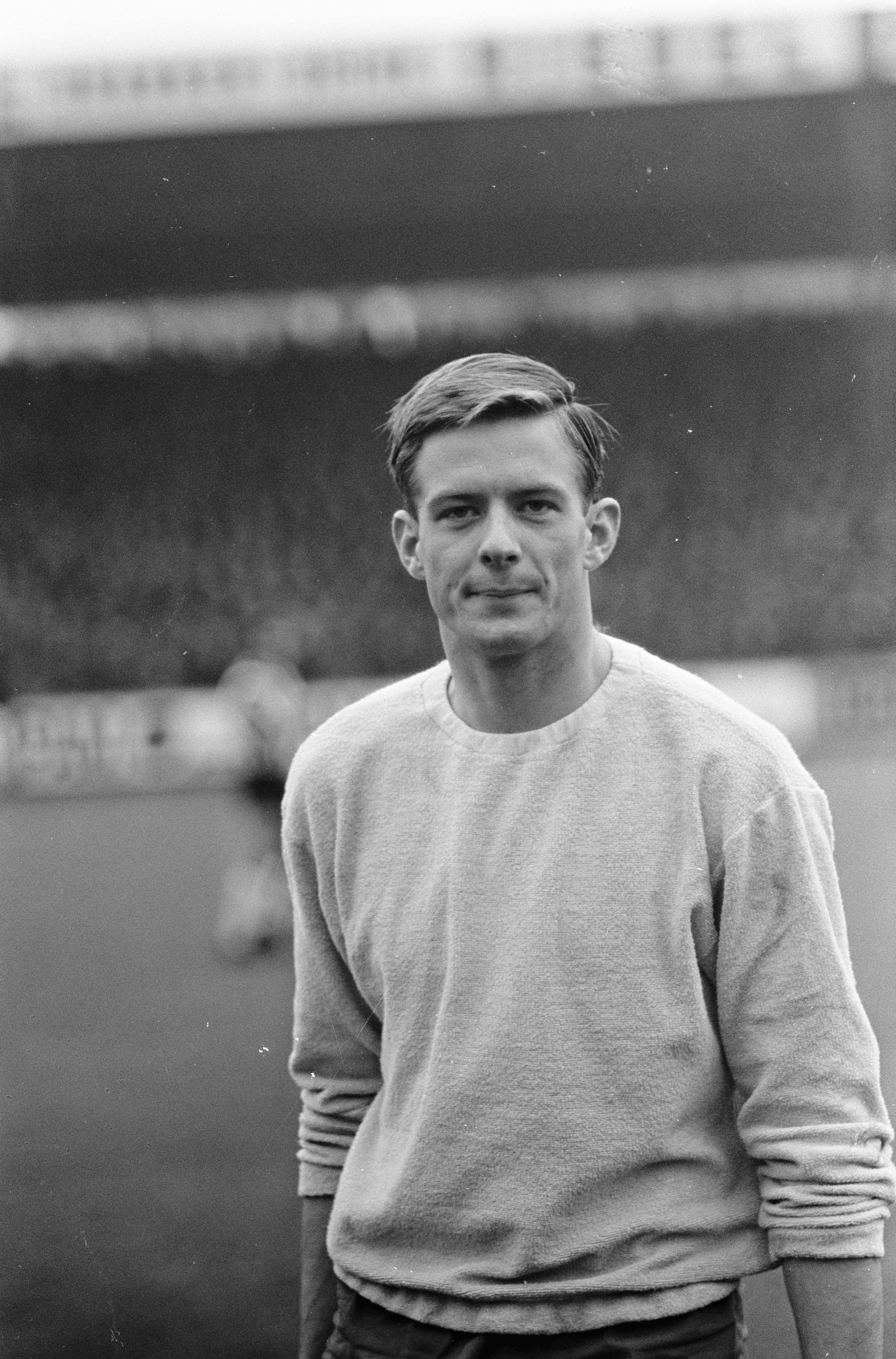
- van Zoghel with Go Ahead Eagles in 1966

Personal information
- Full name: Nicolaas van Zoghel
- Date of birth: 22 May 1943 (age 83)
- Place of birth: Soesterberg, Netherlands
- Position: Goalkeeper

Senior career*
Years	Team	Apps	(Gls)
1960–1964	DOS	101	(1)
1964–1973	Go Ahead Eagles	257	(6)
1973–1974	SC Amersfoort		
1974–1977	De Graafschap	58	(0)
1978–1979	Go Ahead Eagles	34	(0)
1979–1980	SC Amersfoort		

International career
1960–1961	Netherlands U19	5	(0)

Managerial career
- 1985–1988: Go Ahead Eagles
- 1993–1994: Dordrecht '90
- 2007–2008: DVC'26
- * Club domestic league appearances and goals

Nico(laas) van Zoghel (born 22 May 1943) is a Dutch retired football manager and player.

== Playing career ==
Van Zoghel started his career with DOS. In 1964, he signed for Go Ahead Eagles. In 1973, he signed for SC Amersfoort. In 1974, he signed for De Graafschap. In 1978, he signed for Go Ahead Eagles. In 1979, he returned to SC Amersfoort. He also played 5 times for the Netherlands national under-19 football team.

== Style of play ==
Van Zoghel played as a goalkeeper. He was known for his penalty kick taking ability and is still the Eredivisie's record scoring goalkeeper with 7.

== Managerial career ==
Van Zoghel managed Go Ahead Eagles and Dordrecht '90 and served as goalkeeper coach at De Graafschap and Vitesse. Later he was in charge of Dutch amateur side DVC'26, helping the club achieve a playoffs position.

== Personal life ==
Van Zoghel was born in 1943 in the Netherlands. After retiring from professional football, he practiced golf.
