= Menno van Dam =

Dutch football manager (born 1983)

Personal information
- Date of birth: 19 June 1983 (age 43)
- Place of birth: Netherlands
- Position: Midfielder

Team information
- Current team: Emmen (manager)

Youth career
- Heerenveen

Senior career*
| Years | Team | Apps | (Gls) |
| 2002–2004 | FC Wolvega | | |
| 2004–2005 | Veendam | | |
| 2005–2007 | Harkemase Boys | | |
| 2007 | Eintracht Nordhorn | 5 | (0) |
| 2008–2012 | MSC | | |
| 2012–2014 | d'Olde Veste | | |
| 2018–2019 | VV Steenwijk | | |

Managerial career
- 2012–2016: d'Olde Veste (youth)
- 2014–2016: Heerenveen (assistant)
- 2016–2018: Groningen (youth)
- 2018–2022: Heerenveen (youth)
- 2022–2024: Brøndby (youth)
- 2024–2025: AaB
- 2025–: Emmen
- * Club domestic league appearances and goals

Menno van Dam (born 19 June 1983) is a Dutch football manager and former player who is the manager of Eerste Divisie club FC Emmen.

== Career ==
In 2022, van Dam was appointed manager of Danish club Brøndby's under-17 team. In the summer of 2023, he helped the under-17s win the league and cup.

In 2024, van Dam was appointed manager of fellow Danish side AaB. He managed his first game for the club during a 4–1 win over Vendsyssel FF. He helped the team achieve promotion. He was sacked on 20 April 2025 after winning only 5 out of 27 games, and losing 14.

== Personal life ==
He has been married and has children.
