= Horacio Macedo (footballer) =

Mexican footballer and manager (born 1963)

Personal information
- Full name: Horacio Alejandro Macedo Esquivel
- Date of birth: 15 April 1963 (age 63)
- Place of birth: Mexico City, Mexico
- Height: 1.78 m (5 ft 10 in)
- Position: Defender

Senior career*
Years	Team	Apps	(Gls)
1981–1988	UNAM	88	(0)
1989–1990	UAT	3	(0)
1990–1991	Estudiantes Tecos	10	(0)
1991–1992	Querétaro	5	(0)

Managerial career
- 2010–2014: Pachuca Reserves and Academy
- 2014: Nuevo Chimalhuacán (Assistant)
- 2017–2019: Chapulineros de Oaxaca
- 2019: Yalmakán B
- 2020: Bombarderos de Tecamac
- * Club domestic league appearances and goals

Horacio Alejandro Macedo Esquivel (born April 15, 1963) is a Mexican football manager and former player. He was born in Mexico City.
