= FC Emmen =

Association football club in Emmen, Netherlands

- Full name: Football Club Emmen
- Founded: 21 August 1925; 101 years ago
- Ground: De Oude Meerdijk; Emmen, Netherlands
- Capacity: 8,600
- Chairman: Eric van Oosterhout
- Head coach: Menno van Dam
- League: Eerste Divisie
- 2025–26: Eerste Divisie, 14th of 20
- Website: fcemmen.nl
Home colours	Away colours

FC Emmen is a professional football club based in Emmen, the Netherlands. They currently compete in the Eerste Divisie, the second tier of Dutch football, following relegation from the Eredivisie in the 2022–23 season. Founded in 1925, the club entered the professional Eerste Divisie in 1985. In 2018, FC Emmen was promoted to the Eredivisie for the first time. Home games are played at De Oude Meerdijk.

== History ==
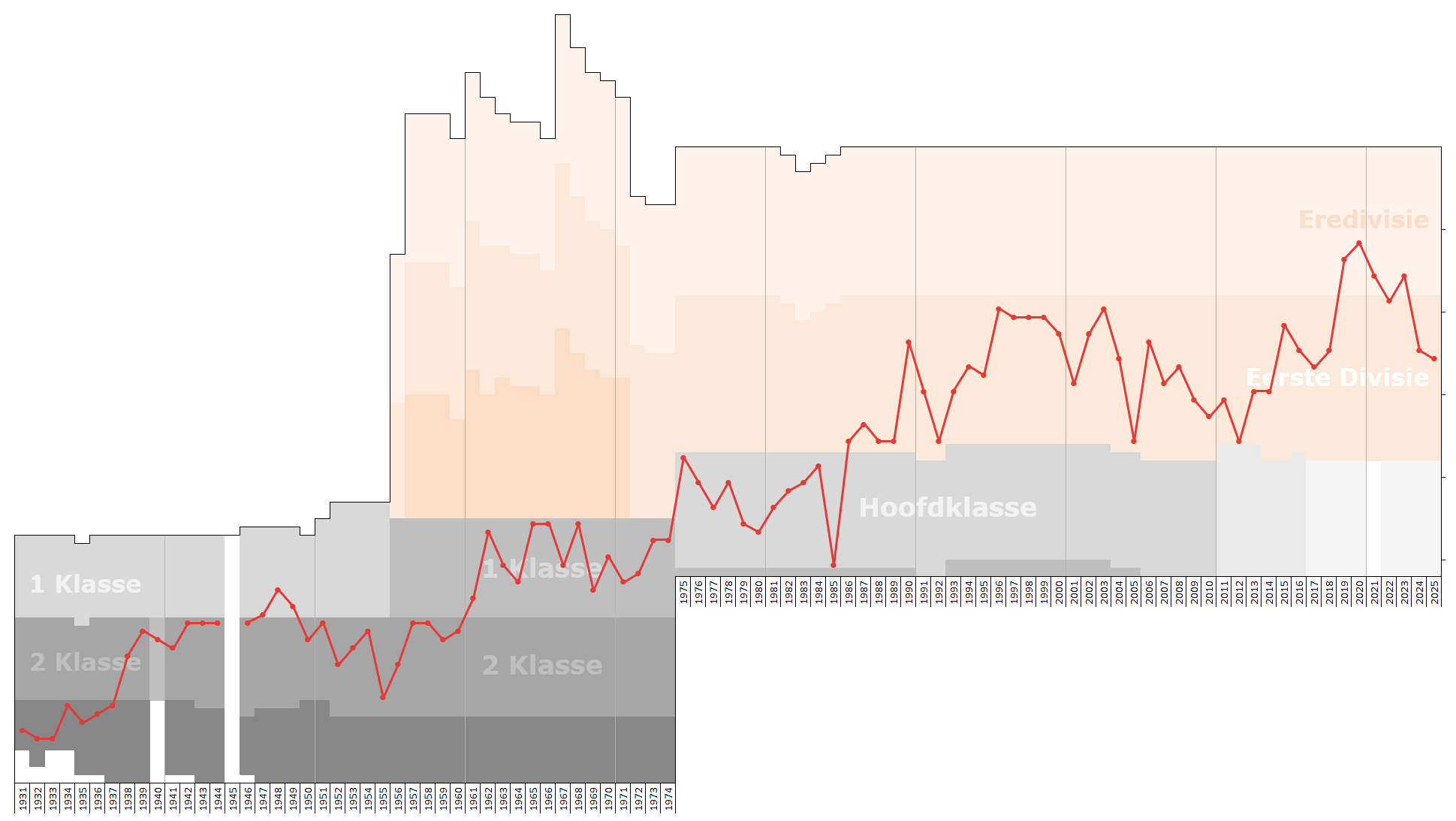
Historical chart of league performance

The amateur club Emmen was formed on 21 August 1925 as NEC (Noordbarge Emmen Combinatie). It was quickly changed to VV Emmen due to confusion with NEC Nijmegen. When the Dutch professional league was formed in 1954, VV Emmen opted to maintain its amateur club status instead.

In 1985, VV Emmen finally joined the professional ranks. In 1988 the club was split into an amateur and a professional section. The latter was mostly called BVO Emmen (Betaald Voetbal Organisatie, professional football organisation). In 2005, the professional club BVO Emmen changed its name into FC Emmen, as it was hoped that the new name would better reflect the club's history, and because many misunderstandings had arisen, among people who had grown to believe that BVO was an abbreviation similar to for instance PSV, RBC or ADO.

FC Emmen has reached the Eerste Divisie play-offs eleven times and on 20 May 2018, they managed to clinch promotion to the Eredivisie for the first time in their history after beating Sparta Rotterdam 3–1 in the promotion/relegation play-off finals.

They played their first Eredivisie match on 12 August 2018 away against ADO Den Haag, and won 2–1. Glenn Bijl scored the first goal for FC Emmen in the top flight. FC Emmen finished 14th in their first Eredivisie season and secured their spot in the Eredivisie for the 2019–20 season.

Despite a very poor start to the 2020–21 season (six points in the first 22 matches), FC Emmen bounced back with an 8-match unbeaten run (five wins, three draws) from February to April, and ended the season with two wins to finish with 30 points. However, they could not achieve automatic safety, as they had a worse goal differential than 15th-placed RKC Waalwijk. This meant that FC Emmen would have to win the playoffs to avoid relegation, but they lost on penalties following a 1–1 draw vs. NAC Breda. As a result of this loss, FC Emmen were relegated to the Eerste Divisie following three seasons in the top tier. However, they were promoted on the first attempt the next year. In the 2022–23 season, they finished 16th, having to win the playoffs to avoid relegation again. This time, they became the first 16th-place team in the Eredivisie to even reach the playoff final under the new format, but they were relegated again after losing to Almere City in the playoff final.

== Stadium ==
FC Emmen's previous JenS Vesting, more popularly known as De Meerdijk, now as de Oude Meerdijk was the scene of several matches of the 2005 FIFA World Youth Championship. It was built in 1977.

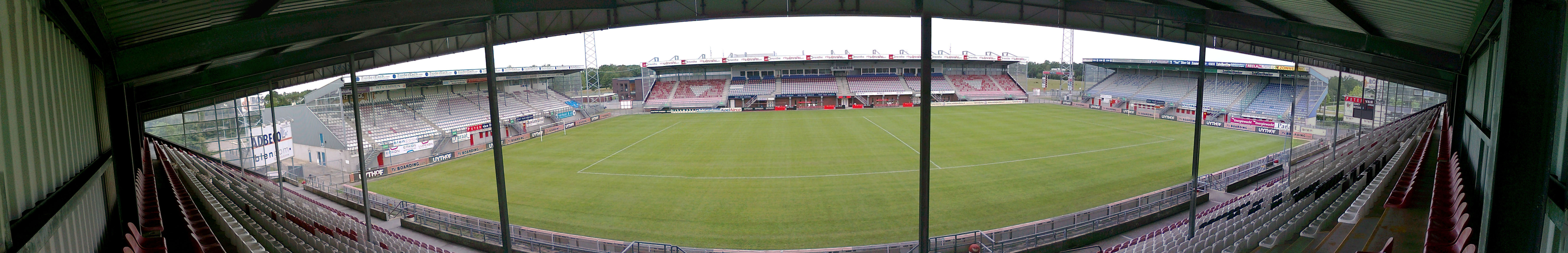

== Sponsors ==
Period	Kit manufacturer	Shirt sponsor
1985–1988	Yellow Bird	American Stores
1988–1989	Hummel	Haka Electronics
1989–1991	Hummel	Zwiers
1991–1993	Hummel	Direktbouw Holland
1993–1995	Hummel	Meubelboulevard Emmen
1995–1997	Hummel	Gamma Emmen
1997–2001	Hummel	Ariston/Indesit
2001–2004	Hummel	Haka Electronics
2004–2006	Hummel	Henk ten Hoor
2006–2007	Hummel	KoelGroep Dorenbos
2007–2008	Hummel	Hof van Saksen
2008–2009	Legea	Hof van Saksen
2009–2012	Legea	Peter van Dijk Projects & Investments
2011–2012	Klupp/Legea	Peter van Dijk Projects & Investments
2012–2013	Jako	Sunoil Biodiesel
2013–2015	Masita	Sunoil Biodiesel
2015–2016	Robey	Q&S Garten Deco
2016–2017	Robey	Noordlease
2017–2018	Beltona	Noordlease
2018–2019	Beltona	Hitachi Capital Mobility
2019–2020	Hummel	Hitachi Capital Mobility
2020–2021	Hummel	EasyToys

== Results ==
Season	League	Rank	Games	Points	GF	GA	Manager	Topscorer	Goals
1985–86	Eerste Divisie	18	36	24	30	54	(Netherlands) Theo Verlangen	(Netherlands) Henry Pelleboer	8
1986–87	Eerste Divisie	16	36	26	41	59	(Netherlands) Theo Verlangen	(Netherlands) Rudy Metz	15
1987–88	Eerste Divisie	18	36	22	29	59	(Netherlands) Theo Verlangen	(Netherlands) Gerrie Schaap	6
1988–89	Eerste Divisie	18	36	20	39	91	(Netherlands) Ben Hendriks	(Netherlands) Willem Brouwer	13
1989–90	Eerste Divisie	6	36	38	53	47	(Netherlands) Ben Hendriks	(Netherlands) Jan de Jonge	16
1990–91	Eerste Divisie	12	38	36	54	67	(Netherlands) Ben Hendriks	(Netherlands) Michel van Oostrum	24
1991–92	Eerste Divisie	18	38	29	37	56	(Netherlands) Piet Buter	(Netherlands) Jan de Jonge	13
1992–93	Eerste Divisie	12	34	27	44	66	(Netherlands) René Notten	(Netherlands) Jan de Jonge	14
1993–94	Eerste Divisie	9	34	36	49	58	(Netherlands) René Notten	(Netherlands) Jan de Jonge	14
1994–95	Eerste Divisie	10	34	35	56	61	(Netherlands) Leen Looijen	(Finland) Antti Sumiala	9
1995–96	Eerste Divisie	2	34	67	71	39	(Netherlands) Azing Griever	(Netherlands) Michel van Oostrum	26
1996–97	Eerste Divisie	3	34	63	58	36	(Netherlands) Azing Griever	(Netherlands) Michel van Oostrum	25
1997–98	Eerste Divisie	3	34	61	64	45	(Netherlands) Azing Griever	(Netherlands) Michel van Oostrum	18
1998–99	Eerste Divisie	3	34	61	53	37	(Netherlands) Azing Griever	(Netherlands) Michel van Oostrum	11
1999–00	Eerste Divisie	5	34	58	53	45	(Netherlands) Jan de Jonge	(Netherlands) Michel van Oostrum (Netherlands) Peter Hofstede	13
2000–01	Eerste Divisie	11	34	41	53	64	(Netherlands) Jan de Jonge	(Netherlands) Peter Hofstede	14
2001–02	Eerste Divisie	5	34	59	53	43	(Netherlands) Hennie Spijkerman	(Netherlands) Paul Weerman	14
2002–03	Eerste Divisie	2	34	75	66	33	(Netherlands) Hennie Spijkerman	(Netherlands) Donny de Groot	30
2003–04	Eerste Divisie	8	36	61	65	54	(Netherlands) Hennie Spijkerman	(Netherlands) Dirk Jan Derksen	14
2004–05	Eerste Divisie	18	36	30	38	71	(Netherlands) Jan Olde Riekerink	(Netherlands) Niki Leferink	11
2005–06	Eerste Divisie	6	38	60	68	56	(Netherlands) Jan van Dijk	(Indonesia) Serginho van Dijk (Morocco) Mourad Mghizrat	18
2006–07	Eerste Divisie	11	38	48	59	65	(Netherlands) Jan van Dijk	(Indonesia) Serginho van Dijk	12
2007–08	Eerste Divisie	9	38	53	61	74	(Netherlands) Gerry Hamstra	(Denmark) Morten Friis Jensen (Netherlands) Roy Stroeve	12
2008–09	Eerste Divisie	13	38	47	48	68	(Netherlands) Gerry Hamstra	(Netherlands) Roy Stroeve	13
2009–10	Eerste Divisie	15	36	48	51	79	(Netherlands) Harry Sinkgraven	(Netherlands) Hans Denissen (Netherlands) Ruud ter Heide	12
2010–11	Eerste Divisie	13	34	35	48	64	(Netherlands) Azing Griever (Netherlands) René Hake	(Netherlands) Ruud ter Heide	15
2011–12	Eerste Divisie	18	34	17	24	73	(Netherlands) René Hake	(Netherlands) Ruud ter Heide	5
2012–13	Eerste Divisie	12	30	32	38	52	(Netherlands) Joop Gall	(Netherlands) Ruud ter Heide (Netherlands) Wout Weghorst	8
2013–14	Eerste Divisie	12	38	51	64	68	(Netherlands) Joop Gall	(Netherlands) Roland Bergkamp	14
2014–15	Eerste Divisie	4	38	67	88	57	(Netherlands) Joop Gall	(Netherlands) Cas Peters	23
2015–16	Eerste Divisie	7	38	51	58	57	(Netherlands) Marcel Keizer (Netherlands) Gert Heerkes	(Aruba) Erixon Danso	14
2016–17	Eerste Divisie	9	38	55	50	40	(Netherlands) Dick Lukkien	(Netherlands) Cas Peters	14
2017–18	Eerste Divisie	7	38	58	58	50	(Netherlands) Dick Lukkien	(Netherlands) Cas Peters	17
2018–19	Eredivisie	14	34	38	41	72	(Netherlands) Dick Lukkien	(Netherlands) Anco Jansen	5
2019–20	Eredivisie	12	26	32	32	45	(Netherlands) Dick Lukkien	(Netherlands) Michael de Leeuw	9
2020–21	Eredivisie	16	34	30	40	68	(Netherlands) Dick Lukkien	(Netherlands) Michael de Leeuw	15
2021–22	Eerste Divisie	1	38	83	64	24	(Netherlands) Dick Lukkien	(Netherlands) Rui Mendes	17
2022–23	Eredivisie	16	34	28	33	65	(Netherlands) Dick Lukkien	(Netherlands) Ole Romeny	11
2023–24	Eerste Divisie	7	38	57	59	60	(Netherlands) Fred Grim	(Poland) Piotr Parzyszek	10
2024–25	Eerste Divisie	8	38	56	56	53	(Germany) Robin Peter	(France) Kélian Nsona	13
2025–26	Eerste Divisie	14	38	45	58	72	(Netherlands) Menno van Dam	(Netherlands) Romano Postema	24

== Coaching staff ==
Position	Staff
Head coach	(Netherlands) Menno van Dam
Assistant coach	(Netherlands) Alfons Arts (Netherlands) Marc Hegeman
Goalkeeper coach	(Netherlands) Richard Moes
Fitness coach	(Netherlands) Peter Eppinga
Video analyst	(France) Matthias Maurer
Kitman	(Netherlands) Karel Hilbrands (Netherlands) Dirk-Jan Stap
Rehabilitation coach	(Netherlands) Jan Haak
Club doctor	(Netherlands) Hans de Vries (Netherlands) Gerben Bulthuis (Netherlands) Dick Grootoonk
Physiotherapist	(Netherlands) Richard Moes (Netherlands) Ruben Zuidema
Chief scout	(Netherlands) Jan Korte (Netherlands) Jurjan Mannes
Scout	(Netherlands) Jordy Fühler
Team manager	(Netherlands) Harm Hensens

== Players ==
=== Current squad ===
As of 2 September 2026

Note: Flags indicate national team as defined under FIFA eligibility rules; some limited exceptions apply. Players may hold more than one non-FIFA nationality.

No.	Pos.	Nation	Player
1	GK	NED	Sam Karssies (on loan from Twente)
2	DF	NED	Joshua Mukeh
3	DF	FRA	Yanis Dede-Lhomme
4	DF	DEN	Christian Østergaard
5	DF	NED	David Voûte
6	MF	NED	Casper Staring
7	MF	GER	Torben Rhein
8	MF	GER	Luca Denk
9	FW	SWE	Jack Cooper-Love
10	FW	SYR	Mustafa Abdullatif
11	FW	NED	Nelson Amadin
12	FW	NED	Freddy Quispel
14	FW	NED	Stan van Manen
15	FW	NED	Chiel Sunder

No.	Pos.	Nation	Player
16	GK	NED	Dirk Baron
17	DF	BEL	Bryan van Hove
18	DF	GER	Vincent Carus
19	MF	DEN	Adam Claridge
20	MF	NED	Peter Quispel
21	MF	CAN	Alessandro Hojabrpour
22	FW	NED	Michael Breij
23	FW	NED	Daan Lambers
24	DF	NED	Luca Everink
25	MF	NED	Rodney Kongolo
27	FW	NED	Jasper Huijzer
29	FW	FRA	Safyan Touré
38	GK	NED	Kevin Norder
40	MF	NED	Sybrand Veldhuis

== Honours ==
- Eerste Divisie
  - Winner: 2021–22
- Sunday amateur football title
  - Winner: 1974–75
- Sunday Hoofdklasse C
  - Winner: 1974–75

== Former technical directors ==
- Rob Groener
- Gerard Somer
