= Mabi de Almeida =

Angolan football coach

Personal information
- Full name: Álvaro de Almeida
- Date of birth: 12 October 1963
- Place of birth: Benguela, Portuguese West Africa
- Date of death: 6 June 2010 (aged 46)
- Place of death: Huambo, Angola

Managerial career
- Years: Team
- 2001–2006: Angola U20
- 2006–2008: Angola (Assistant)
- 2008–2009: Angola
- 2010: Caála

Álvaro "Mabi" de Almeida (12 October 1963 – 6 June 2010) was an Angolan professional football coach.

== Career ==
De Almeida was appointed Manager of the Angolan national team in November 2008, having previously been the Assistant Coach. In April 2009, the Angola Football Federation announced that although Mabi de Almeida's position was safe, they would be looking for a new coach. However, just a few days later, Mabi de Almeida was sacked after seven months in charge. He was named manager of Angolan club side Caála in May 2010.

== Death ==
De Almeida died on 6 June 2010 at the Huambo Province's Military Hospital, at the age of 46.
