= Jan de Jonge =

Dutch footballer and manager (born 1963)

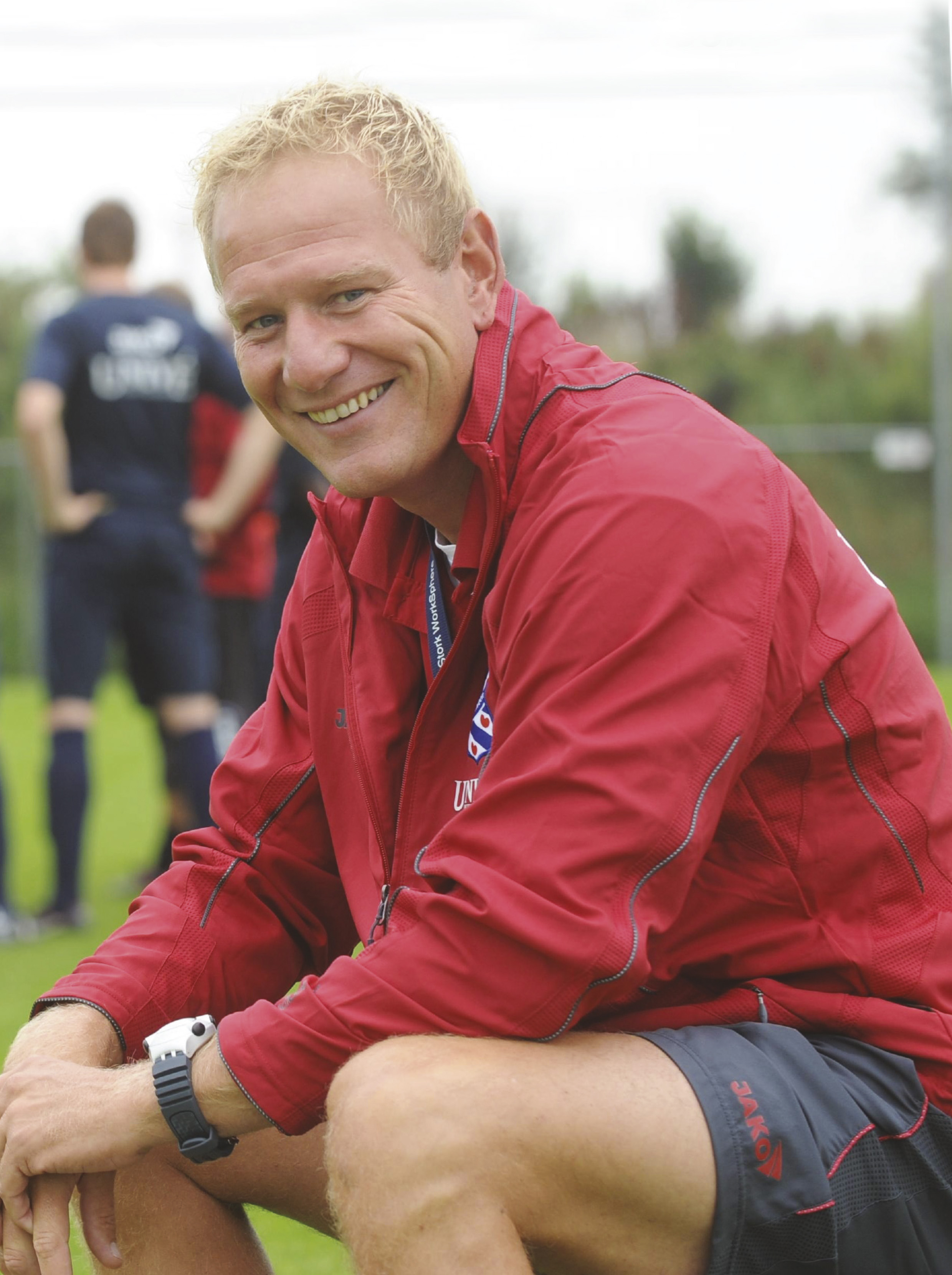

Personal information
- Date of birth: 8 May 1963 (age 63)
- Place of birth: Emmen, Netherlands
- Position: Striker

Team information
- Current team: Waskemeer (head coach)

Youth career
- Germanicus Coevorden

Senior career*
Years	Team	Apps	(Gls)
1982–1984	Groningen	20	(6)
1984–1989	Heerenveen	152	(55)
1989–1996	Emmen	238	(92)
Total		410	(153)

Managerial career
- 1996–1999: Emmen (assistant)
- 1998–2001: Emmen
- 2001–2005: Heerenveen (assistant)
- 2005–2008: De Graafschap
- 2008–2009: Heerenveen (youth coach)
- 2009–2010: Heerenveen (interim)
- 2010–2013: Heerenveen (assistant)
- 2013–2014: Heracles Almelo
- 2015–2016: Nea Salamis
- 2016–2017: VfL Bochum (assistant)
- 2017–2018: Twente (assistant)
- 2018: Eskisehirspor (assistant)
- 2019–2021: De Treffers
- 2021–2022: Samsunspor (assistant)
- 2022–2023: Harkemase Boys
- 2023: Safa
- 2024: Hoogeveen (interim)
- 2024–: Waskemeer
- * Club domestic league appearances and goals

Jan de Jonge (born 8 May 1963) is a Dutch professional football coach and former player who is currently the head coach of Dutch ninth-tier Vierde Klasse club Waskemeer. As a player, he played as a striker for three clubs in the Netherlands: FC Groningen, SC Heerenveen and FC Emmen.

== Managerial career ==
He was manager of FC Emmen, De Graafschap and he also served as assistant and interim manager of Dutch Eredivisie football club SC Heerenveen, after the dismissal of Trond Sollied during the early weeks of the 2009–10 season. In June 2013 he was appointed by Heracles.

He was sacked by Heracles on 31 August 2014 after the club lost its first four Eredivisie matches of the 2014-15 season.

On 28 June 2023, De Jonge was appointed head coach of Lebanese Premier League club Safa. Jansen left Safa on 13 September 2023 for what was cited as personal reasons.

He returned to the Netherlands and was appointed interim head coach of Hoogeveen on 8 April 2024, as the Derde Divisie club fought against relegation. Despite his efforts, the team was relegated to the Vierde Divisie through the play-offs.

In July 2024, De Jonge made a surprising move by becoming head coach of ninth-tier Vierde Klasse club Waskemeer.
