= Michel van Oostrum =

Dutch footballer

Personal information
- Date of birth: 22 August 1966 (age 60)
- Place of birth: Amsterdam, Netherlands
- Position: Striker

Senior career*
Years	Team	Apps	(Gls)
1985–1986	Ajax	0	(0)
1985–1987	Telstar	35	(15)
1987–1989	PEC Zwolle	10	(3)
1989–1990	BSC Old Boys	13	(3)
1990–1993	FC Emmen	97	(47)
1992–1993	Cambuur Leeuwarden	11	(5)
1993–1994	De Graafschap	13	(7)
1993–1995	Cambuur Leeuwarden	38	(4)
1995–2000	FC Emmen	144	(93)
2000–2001	Telstar	14	(9)
2000–2002	FC Emmen	33	(8)
- * Club domestic league appearances and goals

Michel van Oostrum (born 22 August 1966) is a retired Dutch football striker who ended his professional career in 2002. He twice became topscorer in the Dutch First Division, playing for FC Emmen: in 1996 (26 goals) and 1997 (25 goals). Van Oostrum had a short spell in Switzerland with BSC Old Boys (1989–1990).
