= Dick Sigmond =

Dutch footballer

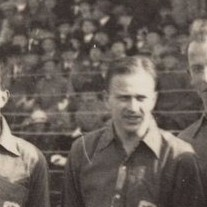
- Dick Sigmond for the international match against France

Personal information
- Date of birth: 22 May 1897
- Place of birth: Dordrecht, Netherlands
- Date of death: 22 February 1950 (aged 52)
- Place of death: Hilversum, Netherlands

International career
Years	Team	Apps	(Gls)
- Netherlands

Dick Sigmond (22 May 1897 – 22 February 1950) was a Dutch footballer. He competed in the men's tournament at the 1924 Summer Olympics.
