= Peter Uneken =

Dutch football manager (born 1972)

Personal information
- Full name: Petrus Wilhelmus Uneken
- Date of birth: 4 February 1972 (age 54)
- Place of birth: Sleen, Netherlands
- Height: 1.91 m (6 ft 3 in)
- Position: Defender

Team information
- Current team: Go Ahead Eagles (assistant manager)

Senior career*
Years	Team	Apps	(Gls)
1993–1999	Emmen	153	(8)
1999–2007	Den Bosch	214	(19)
2007–2009	Helmond Sport	63	(8)
Total		430	(35)

Managerial career
- 2009–2011: Den Bosch (youth)
- 2011–2014: NEC (youth)
- 2014–2017: PSV (youth)
- 2017–2019: Jong PSV (assistant)
- 2019–2021: Jong PSV
- 2021–2023: RKC Waalwijk (assistant)
- 2023–2025: Twente (assistant)
- 2025–2026: VVV-Venlo
- 2026–: Go Ahead Eagles (assistant)
- * Club domestic league appearances and goals

Petrus "Peter" Wilhelmus Uneken (born 4 February 1972) is a Dutch professional football manager and former player who is an assistant coach with Eredivisie club Go Ahead Eagles.

== Career ==
As a player, he played for FC Emmen, FC Den Bosch and Helmond Sport. He retired from professional football in 2009, after which he started his coaching career as a youth coach at FC Den Bosch.

In 2011, he became a youth coach at NEC, where he stayed until 2014. He then moved to PSV Eindhoven, also as a youth coach.

On 18 April 2019, it was announced that he would become head coach of Jong PSV, the club's second team, at the start of the 2019–20 season. He left the position ahead of the 2021–22 season, as he was appointed assistant coach of RKC Waalwijk.

On 29 September 2025, Uneken was hired as the head coach of VVV-Venlo until the end of the 2025–26 season.

On 15 June 2026, Uneken joined Go Ahead Eagles as an assistant coach, reuniting with Joseph Oosting, whom he previously assisted at RKC Waalwijk and Twente.

== Personal life ==
His son Jesper Uneken is also a professional footballer.

== Honours ==
Den Bosch

- Eerste Divisie: 2003–04
