= Robert Veronese =

Swedish footballer

Personal information
- Full name: Robert Bruno Veronese
- Date of birth: 3 October 1963 (age 63)
- Place of birth: Stockholm, Sweden
- Height: 1.80 m (5 ft 11 in)
- Position: Midfielder

Youth career
- 1970–1974: IF Brommapojkarna
- 1975–1982: AIK Fotboll

Senior career*
Years	Team	Apps	(Gls)
1983–1987	Väsby IK		
1988–1989	AIK	15	(0)
1990–1993	Väsby IK		
1994–1995	Huvudsta IS		
1996–1997	Helenelunds IK		
1999–2000	Viggbyholms IK FF		

Managerial career
- 1998–2011: IFK Täby (youth)
- * Club domestic league appearances and goals

Robert Bruno Veronese (born 3 October 1963) is a Swedish former footballer who played as a midfielder, most notably for AIK.

== Career ==
=== Early career ===
Veronese started off his footballing career with IF Brommapojkarna before switching over to AIK's youth section in 1975. He never managed to break into the first team at AIK during his first stint with the club and instead signed with Väsby IK in 1983. He played under manager Sanny Åslund at Väsby, and when Åslund was appointed AIK's head coach in 1988 he immediately signed Veronese to AIK from his former club.

=== AIK ===
Veronese made his Allsvenskan debut for AIK on 11 April 1988, starting as a right-winger in a home game at Råsunda Stadium against IFK Norrköping. AIK won the game 2–0, and Veronese played for 60 minutes before being substituted for Kim Bergstand. Veronese would go on to appear in another six games during the 1988 Allsvenskan season as AIK finished 10th in the table.

In his second season with the club, Veronese appeared in eight games as AIK finished 8th during the 1989 Allsvenskan season. At the end of the season, AIK's assistant manager Håkan Ericson left AIK for Väsby IK and brought Veronese with him to his new club together with fellow AIK players Mats Olausson and Thomas Johansson.

In total, Veronese appeared in 15 Allsvenskan games while at AIK.

=== Later career and retirement ===
After leaving AIK, Veronese spent the years between 1990 and 2000 with Väsby IK, Huvudsta IS, Helenelunds IK, and Viggbyholms IK before retiring from playing and instead focusing on coaching youth players at IFK Täby.

== Honours ==
Väsby IK

- Division 2 Mellersta: 1987
