= Damir Kalapač =

Croatian footballer (born 1963)

Personal information
- Full name: Damir Kalapač
- Date of birth: 18 August 1963 (age 63)
- Place of birth: Zadar, SR Croatia, SFR Yugoslavia
- Position: Defender

Senior career*
Years	Team	Apps	(Gls)
1985–1987	Zadar	21+	(2+)
1987–1988	1860 Munich	8	(0)
1988–1993	NK Zagreb	59+	(4+)
1993–1995	Segesta	44	(4)
1995	Zadar		
1996–1997	DSV Leoben	28	(2)

International career
1991	Croatia	1	(0)
- * Club domestic league appearances and goals

Damir Kalapač (born 18 August 1963) is a Croatian retired footballer who played as a defender and made one appearance for the Croatia national team.

== International career ==
Kalapač earned his first and only cap for Croatia on 19 June 1991 in a friendly match against a Slovenia selection. He came on as an 80th-minute substitute for Mladen Mladenović in the away match, which was played in Murska Sobota and finished as a 1–0 win.

== Career statistics ==
=== International ===
Croatia
Year	Apps	Goals
1991	1	0
Total	1	0
