= Willem Brouwer =

Dutch footballer and manager

Personal information
- Full name: Willem Brouwer
- Date of birth: 30 March 1963 (age 63)
- Position: Striker

Senior career*
Years	Team	Apps	(Gls)
1985-1986	Telstar	20	(3)
1986-1987	Heerenveen	23	(3)
1987-1988	Drachten		
1988-1989	Emmen	36	(13)
1989–1994	Veendam	171	(47)
1995	Emmen	14	(3)
1995–1998	Drachten		
1998–2002	Harkemase Boys		
- * Club domestic league appearances and goals

Willem Brouwer (born 30 March 1963) is a retired football striker from the Netherlands. He played professional football for nine years, for Telstar, SC Heerenveen, FC Emmen and BV Veendam.

== Managerial career ==
After his career Brouwer became a manager in Dutch amateur football, coaching teams including Harkemase Boys, Berkum and Flevo Boys.

He was named manager at former club VV Drachten in January 2017. He announced his retirement as manager in December 2022 while in charge of VV Buitenpost.
