= Paul Nuijten =

Dutch football manager

Personal information
- Full name: Paul Nuijten
- Date of birth: 31 December 1992 (age 33)
- Place of birth: Geldrop, Netherlands

Team information
- Current team: FC Dordrecht (manager)

Managerial career
- Years: Team
- 2014–2017: VV UNA (youth)
- 2017–2022: Willem II (youth)
- 2022–2024: Queen's Park (assistant)
- 2023–2024: Queen's Park (caretaker)
- 2024–2025: Ajax U17
- 2025: Ajax U19
- 2025–2026: Ajax (assistant)
- 2026: Jong Ajax
- 2026–: FC Dordrecht

Paul Nuijten (born 31 December 1992) is a Dutch professional football manager who is currently the head coach of Eerste Divisie club FC Dordrecht.

== Early career ==
Born in Geldrop, Nuijten did not play football at the professional level. He began his coaching career in the youth system of amateur club VV UNA before joining the academy of Willem II in 2017, where he progressed through the ranks to coach the Under-18 squad.

== Managerial career ==
=== Queen's Park ===
In 2022, Nuijten was appointed as Head of the Pro & Youth Program at Scottish Championship club Queen's Park by Director of Football Operations Marijn Beuker. He was later promoted to first-team assistant manager under Robin Veldman. Following Veldman's departure, Nuijten served as caretaker manager between December 2023 and January 2024, recording a win and a draw in two matches. He left the club in May 2024.

=== AFC Ajax ===
In the summer of 2024, Nuijten reunited with Beuker at AFC Ajax, joining the coaching setup at the De Toekomst sports complex. He initially took charge of the Ajax Under-17 squad, leading them to victory in the international Future Cup, before taking over as head coach of the Under-19 team for the 2025–26 season.

In November 2025, Nuijten was temporarily promoted to the first-team coaching staff, serving as an assistant to interim manager Fred Grim following the dismissal of John Heitinga.

On 8 March 2026, Nuijten was named head coach of reserve side Jong Ajax in the Eerste Divisie. He won his managerial debut on 13 March 2026 in a 3–2 victory over FC Den Bosch. On 26 June 2026, Ajax announced that Nuijten's contract had been mutually terminated to allow him to pursue a senior head coaching role.

=== FC Dordrecht ===
On 26 June 2026, Nuijten was appointed head coach of Eerste Divisie side FC Dordrecht on a two-year contract, succeeding Dirk Kuyt following the latter's departure to Fenerbahçe.

== Managerial statistics ==
As of 1 August 2026

Managerial record by team and tenure
| Team | Nat. | From | To | Record | | | | | | | |
| Team | Nat. | From | To | G | W | D | L | GF | GA | GD | Win % |
|---|---|---|---|---|---|---|---|---|---|---|---|
| Queen's Park (caretaker) | (Scotland) | 14 December 2023 | 9 January 2024 | 2 | 1 | 1 | 0 | 2 | 1 | +1 | 50.00 |
| Jong Ajax | (Netherlands) | 8 March 2026 | 26 June 2026 | 10 | 4 | 3 | 3 | 16 | 14 | +2 | 40.00 |
| FC Dordrecht | (Netherlands) | 26 June 2026 | Present | 0 | 0 | 0 | 0 | 0 | 0 | +0 | — |
| Total | | | | 12 | 5 | 4 | 3 | 18 | 15 | +3 | 41.67 |
