= Alfons Arts =

Dutch football manager

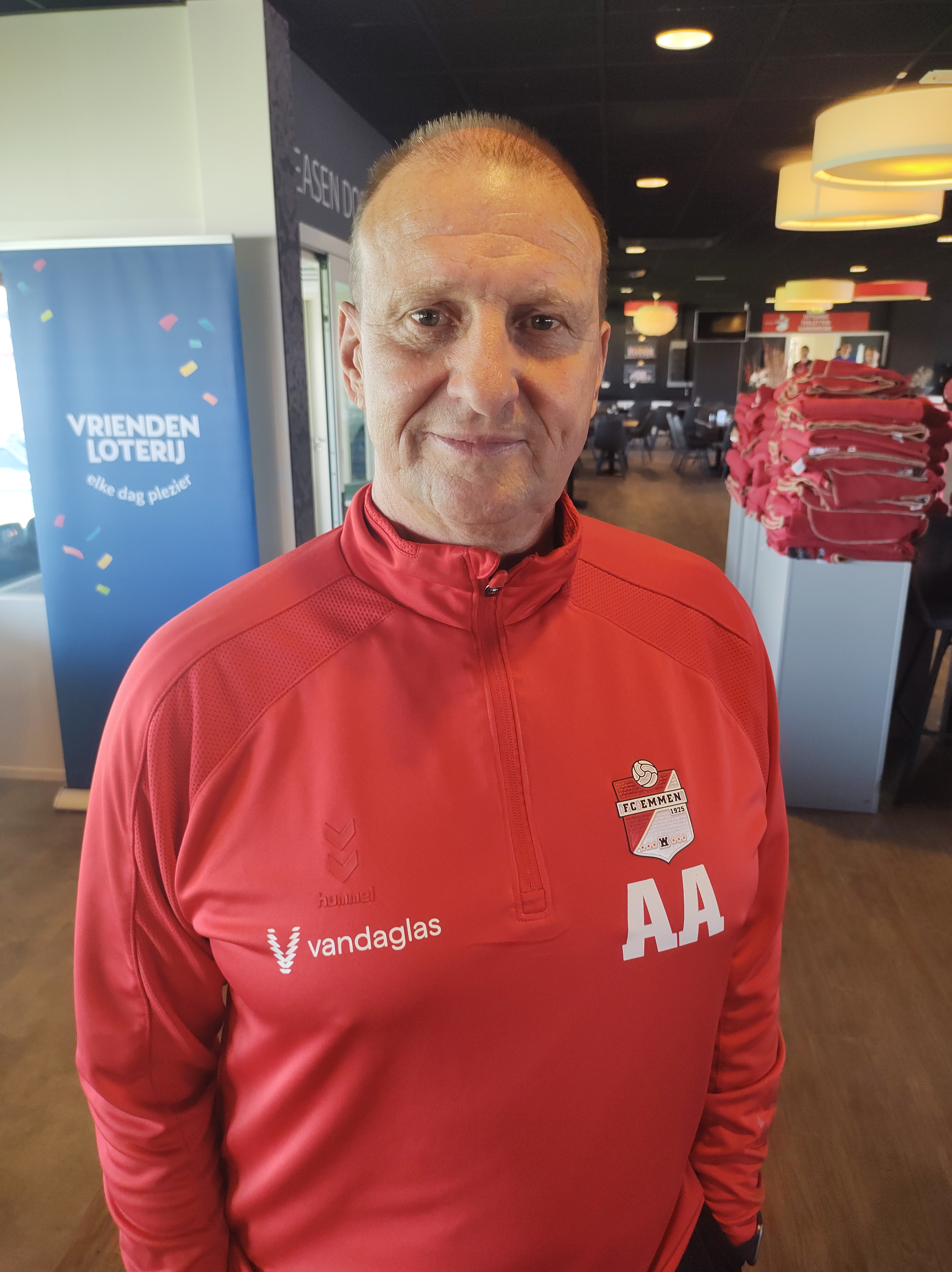

Personal information
- Date of birth: 29 August 1965 (age 61)
- Place of birth: Zeist, Netherlands
- Position: Defender

Team information
- Current team: Emmen (asst. manager)

Youth career
- Unitas ’59

Senior career*
Years	Team	Apps	(Gls)
1986	PSV	0	(0)
1986–1990	MVV	112	(29)
1990–1996	Go Ahead Eagles	149	(6)
1996–2003	Emmen	181	(2)
Total		442	(37)

Managerial career
- 2007: Emmen
- 2007–2010: Cambuur (assistant)
- 2010–2013: Cambuur
- 2015–2019: Groningen (youth)
- 2019–2023: Groningen (assistant)
- 2024: Emmen (interim)
- 2025-: Emmen (interim)
- * Club domestic league appearances and goals

Alfons Arts (born 29 August 1965) is a Dutch retired football defender and later manager.

== Playing career ==
Arts started his professional career at MVV after not making it to PSV's first team. With MVV he won promotion to the Eredivisie in 1988. He then joined Go Ahead Eagles in 1990, again clinching promotion to the top tier, before ending up at Emmen.

== Managerial career ==
Born in Zeist, but raised in Eindhoven, Arts was caretaker manager at Emmen in 2007 and was appointed assistant manager at the club in 2024.
