= 2024–25 AFC Ajax season =

Dutch football club season

AFC Ajax
2024–25 season
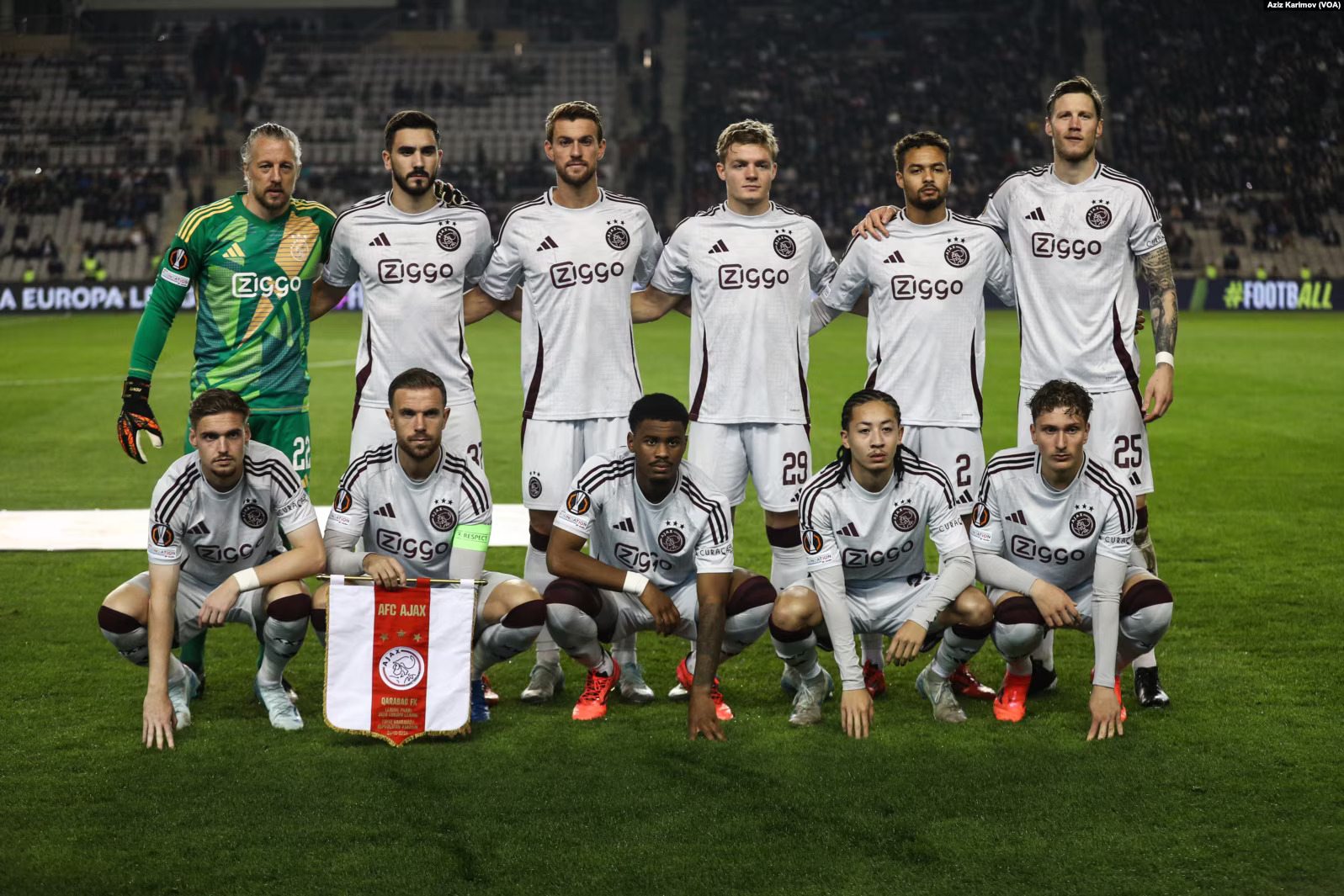
- Ajax line-up away against Qarabağ (24-10-2024)
- Owner: AFC Ajax N.V. (Euronext Amsterdam: AJAX)
- CEO: Menno Geelen (interim until April 2025)
- Head coach: Francesco Farioli
- Stadium: Johan Cruyff Arena
- Eredivisie: 2nd
- KNVB Cup: Round of 16
- UEFA Europa League: Round of 16
- Top goalscorer: League: Wout Weghorst (10); All: Kenneth Taylor (15)
- Highest home attendance: 54,913 (vs Feyenoord, 2 February 2025; Eredivisie)
- Lowest home attendance: 50,127 (vs Lazio, 12 December 2024; UEFA Europa League)
- Average home league attendance: 54,130
- Biggest win: 5–0 (vs Fortuna Sittard (H); 18 September 2024; Eredivisie), (vs Maccabi Tel Aviv (H); 7 November 2024; UEFA Europa League)
- Biggest defeat: 0–4 (vs Utrecht (A); 20 April 2025; Eredivisie)
Home colours	Away colours	Third colours

The 2024–25 season was the 125th season in the history of Ajax, and their 69th consecutive season in the Dutch top flight. The club participated in the Eredivisie, KNVB Cup and UEFA Europa League.

== Players ==
=== Squad ===
As of 6 February 2025

Note: Flags indicate national team as defined under FIFA eligibility rules; some limited exceptions apply. Players may hold more than one non-FIFA nationality.

No.	Pos.	Nation	Player
2	DF	BRA	Lucas Rosa
3	DF	DEN	Anton Gaaei
4	DF	NED	Jorrel Hato
5	DF	NED	Owen Wijndal
6	MF	ENG	Jordan Henderson (captain)
8	MF	NED	Kenneth Taylor
9	FW	NED	Brian Brobbey
11 (39)	FW	BEL	Mika Godts
12	GK	NED	Jay Gorter
13	DF	TUR	Ahmetcan Kaplan
15	DF	NED	Youri Baas
16	GK	BRA	Matheus
17	MF	NOR	Oliver Edvardsen
18	MF	NED	Davy Klaassen (vice-captain)

No.	Pos.	Nation	Player
19	FW	NED	Julian Rijkhoff
20	FW	BFA	Bertrand Traoré
21	MF	NED	Branco van den Boomen
22	GK	NED	Remko Pasveer
23	MF	NED	Steven Berghuis (3rd captain)
24 (26)	DF	ITA	Daniele Rugani
25	FW	NED	Wout Weghorst
27	FW	NED	Amourricho van Axel Dongen
28	MF	NED	Kian Fitz-Jim
29	FW	DEN	Christian Rasmussen
36	DF	NED	Dies Janse
37	DF	CRO	Josip Šutalo
44	MF	NED	Youri Regeer

== Transfers ==
=== In ===
Date	Pos.	Player	Transferred from	Fee	Ref.
24 June 2024	DF	(Belgium) Jorthy Mokio	(Belgium) Gent	Free transfer	
10 July 2024	FW	(Norway) Daniel Skaarud	(Norway) Lillestrøm	€1,200,000	
15 July 2024	FW	(Burkina Faso) Bertrand Traoré	(Spain) Villarreal	Free transfer	
29 August 2024	FW	(Netherlands) Wout Weghorst	(England) Burnley	€2,300,000	
17 September 2024	MF	(Netherlands) Davy Klaassen	(Italy) Inter Milan	Free transfer	
24 January 2025	MF	(Netherlands) Youri Regeer	(Netherlands) Twente	€4,500,000	
31 January 2025	MF	(Norway) Oliver Edvardsen	(Netherlands) Go Ahead Eagles	€3,000,000	
4 February 2025	DF	(Brazil) Lucas Rosa	(Spain) Real Valladolid	€3,000,000	

=== Out ===
Date	Pos.	Player	Transferred to	Fee	Ref.
22 May 2024	GK	(Netherlands) Sten Kremers	(Netherlands) De Graafschap	Free transfer	
5 June 2024	FW	(Portugal) Francisco Conceição	(Portugal) Porto	€10,500,000 (Note: Plus sell-through gain percentage of 10 percent)	
19 June 2024	GK	(Netherlands) Tom de Graaff	(Netherlands) Utrecht	Undisclosed	
1 July 2024	FW	(Georgia (country)) Georges Mikautadze	(France) Metz	€13,000,000	
4 July 2024	DF	(Mexico) Jorge Sanchez	(Mexico) Cruz Azul	€3,000,000	
10 July 2024	MF	(Netherlands) Gabriel Misehouy	(Spain) Girona	Free transfer	
11 July 2024	DF	(Serbia) Mateja Milovanović	(Netherlands) Heerenveen	Free transfer	
21 July 2024	GK	(England) Tommy Setford	(England) Arsenal	€900,000	
31 July 2024	DF	(Curaçao) Ar'jany Martha	(Belgium) Beerschot	Free transfer	
11 August 2024	GK	(Argentina) Gerónimo Rulli	(France) Marseille	€4,000,000	
26 August 2024	DF	(Netherlands) Olivier Aertssen	(Netherlands) PEC Zwolle	€150,000	
30 August 2024	MF	(Netherlands) Silvano Vos	(Italy) Milan	€3,000,000	
2 September 2024	FW	(Netherlands) Steven Bergwijn	(Saudi Arabia) Al-Ittihad	€21,000,000	
16 January 2025	MF	(Turkey) Naci Ünüvar	(Netherlands) FC Twente	Free transfer	
23 January 2025	DF	(Netherlands) Devyne Rensch	(Italy) Roma	€5,000,000	
3 February 2025	GK	(Germany) Diant Ramaj	(Germany) Borussia Dortmund	€5,000,000	
3 February 2025	MF	(Bosnia and Herzegovina) Benjamin Tahirović	(Denmark) Brøndby	€2,750,000	
3 February 2025	FW	(Netherlands) Jaydon Banel	(England) Burnley	€1,000,000	

=== Loans in ===
Start date	Pos.	Player	From	End date	Fee	Ref.
21 August 2024	DF	(Italy) Daniele Rugani	(Italy) Juventus	30 June 2025	Undisclosed	
4 February 2025	GK	(Brazil) Matheus	(Portugal) Braga	30 June 2025	Undisclosed	

=== Loans out ===
Date	Pos.	Player	To	End date	Fee	Ref.
16 July 2024	DF	(Netherlands) Tristan Gooijer	(Netherlands) PEC Zwolle	30 June 2025	Undisclosed	
17 August 2024	DF	(Croatia) Borna Sosa	(Italy) Torino	30 June 2025	Undisclosed	
20 August 2024	DF	(Croatia) Jakov Medić	(Germany) VfL Bochum	30 June 2025	Undisclosed	
29 August 2024	MF	(Turkey) Naci Ünüvar	(Spain) Espanyol	16 January 2025 (Note: Originally loan agreed until 30 June 2025, but terminated earlier due to Ünüvar's transfer to FC Twente.)	Undisclosed	
31 August 2024	FW	(Portugal) Carlos Forbs	(England) Wolverhampton Wanderers	30 June 2025	€2,500,000	
18 January 2025	DF	(Argentina) Gastón Ávila	(Brazil) Fortaleza	31 December 2025	Undisclosed	
28 January 2025	MF	(Norway) Sivert Mannsverk	(Wales) Cardiff City	30 June 2025	Undisclosed	
31 January 2025	MF	(Iceland) Kristian Hlynsson	(Netherlands) Sparta Rotterdam	30 June 2025	Undisclosed	
2 February 2025	FW	(Nigeria) Chuba Akpom	(France) Lille	30 June 2025	Undisclosed	
4 February 2025	DF	(Netherlands) Gerald Alders	(Netherlands) FC Twente	30 June 2025	Undisclosed	

== Overview ==
On 23 May, Ajax signed the contract with new manager Francesco Farioli. His new assistant managers will be Daniele Cavalletto, Dave Vos and Felipe Sanchez Mateos. Jelle ten Rouwelaar was signed as the new goalkeeping coach. Furthermore, Osman Kul is a new video analyst and new fitness coach is Callum Walsh, in the beginning of preseason together with Allesandro Schoenmaker.

On 31 May, the new away kit for the new season and training range was released; Ajax Away: A Work of Amsterdam.

On 19 June, Ajax and Ziggo extended their sponsorship contract by two seasons until 2029. On the same day, Ajax appointed Nynke Hagen as a cultural manager.

On July 4, VI reported that Manchester United wanted to sign goalkeeping coach Jelle ten Rouwelaar. A day later, the media reported that Ten Rouwelaar had left the club; Manchester United had paid €100,000 for him.

The home shirt of this season together with a pre-match shirt were introduced on Friday July 5, the morning of the first practice game: Home is Here.

On July 8, a new goalkeeping coach Jarkko Tuomisto was reported in the media. He had worked with Farioli at previous clubs.

== Pre-season and friendlies ==
Ajax start the new season with a new manager, Francesco Farioli. Farioli's first day at Ajax from the new season was 12 July. A large part of the Ajax squad started on Wednesday 19 June, with the first tests and training methods at De Toekomst. The manager's first field training took place on Thursday, June 20. This was without players that had international games and were at Euro 2024 and Copa America 2024. On Friday, 28 July the manager welcomed players that had international games earlier this month, but were not at Euro 2024. This included Anton Gaaei, Sivert Mannsverk, Benjamin Tahirović, Kristian Hlynsson and Christian Rasmussen.

Ajax played the first practice game against PEC Zwolle on Friday, 5 July on a rainy De Toekomst, ending in a 0–1 loss. Due to renovations and the replacement of grass, the game was played behind closed doors. Furthermore, there are two other practice games played across the Netherlands, against Sint-Truiden and Rangers. These games are open to public.

Also there was a midweek training camp at the Wageningse Berg, Netherlands, from Monday July 15 to Friday July 19. During this week, two friendly matches were played against Al-Wasl (open to public) and Olympiacos (behind closed doors).

The first official games were on 25 July and 1 August for the second qualifying round of the 2024–25 UEFA Europa League against Vojvodina. The first Eredivisie league game was on August 11, at home game against Heerenveen.

Ajax announced that, on Monday 5, there was an Open Day event.

=== Pre-season ===
Win Draw Loss Cancelled/ Susp. Fixtures

5 July 2024 Friendly	Ajax (Netherlands)	0–1	(Netherlands) PEC Zwolle	Ouder-Amstel, Netherlands
14:00 CEST (UTC+2)	Baas (yellow card) 80'	Report	Fontana 20'	Stadium: Sportpark De Toekomst; Attendance: Behind closed doors Referee: Marc Nagtegaal

9 July 2024 Friendly	Ajax (Netherlands)	4–0	(Belgium) Sint-Truiden	Oldebroek, Netherlands
18:00 CEST (UTC+2)	Hato 8'; Banel 46'; Forbs 55'; Taylor 81'	Report		Stadium: Sportpark Bovenmolen; Attendance: 3,400; Referee: Dennis Higler

13 July 2024 Friendly	Ajax (Netherlands)	2–1	(Scotland) Rangers	Wezep, Netherlands
16:00 CEST (UTC+2)	Fitz-Jim 27'; Van den Boomen 41'	Report	Lawrence 33'	Stadium: Sportpark Mulderssingel; Referee: Jeroen Manschot

18 July 2024 Friendly	Ajax (Netherlands)	2–1	(United Arab Emirates) Al-Wasl	Tiel, Netherlands
18:30 CEST (UTC+2)	Rijkhoff 19'; Van den Boomen 31'	Report	Caio 87'	Stadium: Sportpark De Lok

19 July 2024 Friendly	Ajax (Netherlands)	1–0	(Greece) Olympiacos	Driel, Netherlands
15:00 CEST (UTC+2)	Forbs 43'	Report		Stadium: Sportpark Driel; Attendance: Behind closed doors

26 July 2024 Friendly	Ajax (Netherlands)	4–1	(Netherlands) Vitesse	Ouder-Amstel, Netherlands
14:00 CEST (UTC+2)	Van den Boomen 14', 34'; Rijkhoff 40'; Mannsverk (yellow card) 86'; Traoré 87'	Report	Kreekels (yellow card) 30'; Yegoian 62'	Stadium: Sportpark De Toekomst; Attendance: Behind closed doors

=== Mid-season ===
5 January 2024 Friendly	VfB Stuttgart (Germany)	2–2	(Netherlands) Ajax	Stuttgart, Germany
14:00 CET (UTC+1)	Stiller 13'; Führich 19'; Millot (yellow card) 25'	Report	Chabot 52' (o.g.); Klaassen (red card) 56'; Akpom 85'	Stadium: Robert-Schlienz-Stadion; Attendance: 3,000; Referee: Christian Ballweg (Germany)
Note: Despite receiving a red card, Klaassen was allowed to stay on the pitch following consultation between both managers, to keep practicing 11 against 11. There were 15 minutes added after 90 minutes to let all players have playing time.

== Competitions ==
=== Overall record ===
Competition	First match	Last match	Starting round	Final position	Record							
Competition	First match	Last match	Starting round	Final position	Pld	W	D	L	GF	GA	GD	Win %
Eredivisie	11 August 2024	18 May 2025	Matchday 1	2nd	34	24	6	4	67	32	+35	70.59
KNVB Cup	19 December 2024	14 January 2025	Second round	Round of 16	2	1	0	1	2	2	+0	50.00
UEFA Europa League	25 July 2024	13 March 2025	Second qualifying round	Round of 16	18	10	1	7	33	19	+14	55.56
Total					54	35	7	12	102	53	+49	64.81

Source: Soccerway

=== Eredivisie ===
==== League table ====
Pos	Team	Pld	W	D	L	GF	GA	GD	Pts	Qualification or relegation
1	PSV Eindhoven (C)	34	25	4	5	103	39	+64	79	Qualification for the Champions League league phase
2	Ajax	34	24	6	4	67	32	+35	78	Qualification for the Champions League league phase
3	Feyenoord	34	20	8	6	76	38	+38	68	Qualification for the Champions League third qualifying round
4	Utrecht	34	18	10	6	62	45	+17	64	Qualification for the Europa League second qualifying round
5	AZ (O)	34	16	9	9	58	37	+21	57	Qualification for the European competition play-offs

Source: Eredivisie
Rules for classification: 1) Points; 2) Goal difference; 3) Goals scored; 4) Head-to-head points; 5) Head-to-head goal difference; 6) Head-to-head away goals scored; 7) Play-off if relevant for deciding champion, relegation or participating in a European league, otherwise by draw. 8) Penalty shoot-out (only after a play-off)
(C) Champions; (O) Play-off winners

==== Results summary ====
Overall								Home						Away					
Pld	W	D	L	GF	GA	GD	Pts	W	D	L	GF	GA	GD	W	D	L	GF	GA	GD
34	24	6	4	67	32	+35	78	13	3	1	38	14	+24	11	3	3	29	18	+11

Last updated: 18 May 2025.
Source: Eredivisie

==== Results by round ====
Round	1	2	3	4	5	6	7	8	9	10	11	12	13	14	15	16	17	18	19	20	21	22	23	24	25	26	27	28	29	30	31	32	33	34
Ground	H	A	H	A	H	A	A	H	A	H	H	A	H	A	A	H	A	H	A	H	H	A	H	A	A	H	A	H	A	H	A	H	A	H
Result	W	L	W	W	D	D	W	W	W	W	W	D	W	W	L	W	W	W	W	W	W	W	W	W	W	D	W	W	W	D	L	L	D	W
Position	5	9	7	2	2	9	5	5	3	3	2	3	3	2	3	2	2	2	2	2	1	1	1	1	1	1	1	1	1	1	1	1	2	2

Source: Eredivisie
A = Away; H = Home; W = Win; D = Draw; L = Loss

==== Matches ====
The league fixtures were announced on 21 June 2024.

11 August 2024 1	Ajax	1–0	Heerenveen	Amsterdam
16:45 CEST (UTC+2)	Hlynsson 45'	Report	Bochniewicz (yellow card) 16'; Braude (yellow card) 84'	Stadium: Johan Cruyff Arena (roof open); Attendance: 54,346; Referee: Bas Nijhuis

18 August 2024 2	NAC Breda	2–1	Ajax	Breda
16:45 CEST (UTC+2)	Garbett 58'; Van den Bergh 90+1'	Report	Hato 63'; Mannsverk (yellow card) 90+7'	Stadium: Rat Verlegh Stadion; Attendance: 19,000; Referee: Dennis Higler

18 September 2024 3	Ajax	5–0	Fortuna Sittard	Amsterdam
20:00 CEST (UTC+2)	Taylor 9'; Traoré 24'; Baas 58'; Rensch 71'; Akpom 87'	Report	Peterson (yellow card) 35'; Guth (red card) 45+1'	Stadium: Johan Cruyff Arena (roof open); Attendance: 53,786; Referee: Martin van den Kerkhof
Note: The match was originally scheduled for 25 August.

21 September 2024 6	Go Ahead Eagles	1–1	Ajax	Deventer
20:00 CEST (UTC+2)	Llansana 64'; Nauber (yellow card) 78'; Linthorst (yellow card) 90+4'	Report	Klaassen 69'; Brobbey (yellow card) 81'; Gaaei (yellow card) 90+5'	Stadium: De Adelaarshorst; Attendance: 9,997; Referee: Marc Nagtegaal

29 September 2024 7	RKC Waalwijk	0–2	Ajax	Waalwijk
16:45 CEST (UTC+2)	Van Gelderen (yellow card) 20'; Meijers (yellow card) 56'	Report	Brobbey (yellow card) 36'; Traoré 76'; Godts 90+4'	Stadium: Mandemakers Stadion; Attendance: 7,254; Referee: Jochem Kamphuis

6 October 2024 8	Ajax	3–1	Groningen	Amsterdam
16:45 CEST (UTC+2)	Klaassen 21'; Šutalo (yellow card) 65'; Van den Boomen (penalty missed) 73'; Baas (yellow card) 73'; Godts (yellow card) 83'; Weghorst 90+1'; Akpom 90+4'	Report	Resink (yellow card) 42'; Schreuders 69'; Blokzijl (yellow card) 71'	Stadium: Johan Cruyff Arena (roof open); Attendance: 53,984; Referee: Allard Lindhout

20 October 2024 9	Heracles	3–4	Ajax	Almelo
14:30 CEST (UTC+2)	Kulenović 12', 76'; De Keersmaecker (yellow card) 14' (yellow-red card) 84'; Engels 28'	Report	Klaassen 25'; Traoré 34'; Hato (yellow card) 35'; Brobbey (yellow card) 36'; Henderson (yellow card) 37'; Weghorst 63', 82' (pen.); Rasmussen (yellow card) 88'	Stadium: Asito Stadion; Attendance: 12,161; Referee: Edwin van de Graaf

27 October 2024 10	Ajax	1–0	Willem II	Amsterdam
16:45 CET (UTC+1)	Klaassen 6' (pen.); Gaaei (yellow card) 54'	Report		Stadium: Johan Cruyff Arena (roof open); Attendance: 53,359; Referee: Bas Nijhuis

30 October 2024 4	Feyenoord	0–2	Ajax	Rotterdam
18:00 CET (UTC+1)	Trauner (yellow card) 32'; Bueno (yellow card) 42'; Timber (yellow card) 83'; Osman (yellow card) 90+6'	Report	Taylor 6'; Hato 25'; Baas (yellow card) 34'; Šutalo (yellow card) 45+1'	Stadium: De Kuip; Attendance: 47,500; Referee: Danny Makkelie
Note: This match was postponed due to a police unions strike. It was originally scheduled for 1 September 2024, 14:30 CEST.

2 November 2024 11	Ajax	3–2	PSV	Amsterdam
18:45 CET (UTC+1)	Klaassen 44'; Fitz-Jim 66'; Brobbey (yellow card) 70'; Godts 74'; Berghuis (yellow card) 90+4'	Report	De Jong 18', (yellow card) 90+5'; Flamingo (yellow card) 23'; Perišić 54'; Karsdorp (yellow card) 76'	Stadium: Johan Cruyff Arena (roof open); Attendance: 54,831; Referee: Serdar Gözübüyük

10 November 2024 12	Twente	2–2	Ajax	Enschede
14:30 CET (UTC+1)	Vlap 42', 65'; Besselink (yellow card) 51'	Report	Klaassen 59'; Traoré 67'; Hato (yellow card) 72'	Stadium: De Grolsch Veste; Attendance: 30,000; Referee: Allard Lindhout

24 November 2024 13	Ajax	2–0	PEC Zwolle	Amsterdam
16:45 CET (UTC+1)	Brobbey 27'; Hato (yellow card) 43'; Henderson (yellow card) 45'; Šutalo 63'; Wijndal (yellow card) 90+2'	Report	Mbayo (yellow card) 65'	Stadium: Johan Cruyff Arena (roof open); Attendance: 53,677; Referee: Alex Bos

1 December 2024 14	NEC	1–2	Ajax	Nijmegen
16:45 CET (UTC+1)	Hansen 13'; Sano (yellow card) 90+3'	Report	Weghorst 15', 48', (yellow card) 51'; Rensch (yellow card) 31'; Gaaei (yellow card) 69'; Hato (yellow card) 74'; Kaplan (yellow card) 90'	Stadium: Goffertstadion; Attendance: 12,650; Referee: Joey Kooij

4 December 2024 5	Ajax	2–2	Utrecht	Amsterdam
20:00 CET (UTC+1)	Gaaei 25'; Toornstra 29' (o.g.)	Report	Min 16'; Pasveer 79' (o.g.)	Stadium: Johan Cruyff Arena (roof closed); Attendance: 53,267; Referee: Serdar Gözübüyük
Note: This match was postponed due to a police unions strike. It was originally scheduled for 15 September, 14:30 CEST

8 December 2024 15	AZ	2–1	Ajax	Alkmaar
14:30 CET (UTC+1)	Goes (yellow card) 46'; Parrott 65'; Lahdo 76'	Report	Weghorst (yellow card) 36'; Šutalo (yellow card) 45+2'; Godts 81'	Stadium: AFAS Stadion; Attendance: 19,002; Referee: Marc Nagtegaal

15 December 2024 16	Ajax	3–0	Almere City	Amsterdam
16:45 CET (UTC+1)	Weghorst 12'; Taylor 40'; Fitz-Jim 55'; Rensch (yellow card) 57'	Report	Jacobs (yellow card) 50'; Kadile (yellow card) 66'	Stadium: Johan Cruyff Arena (roof open); Attendance: 54,231; Referee: Jeroen Manschot

22 December 2024 17	Sparta Rotterdam	0–2	Ajax	Rotterdam
12:15 CET (UTC+1)	Clement (yellow card) 25'; Van Aanholt (yellow card) 90'	Report	Taylor 77' (pen.); Traoré 87'; Henderson (yellow card) 90'	Stadium: Sparta Stadion Het Kasteel; Attendance: 10,599; Referee: Allard Lindhout

11 January 2025 18	Ajax	2–1	RKC Waalwijk	Amsterdam
18:45 CET (UTC+1)	Berghuis 4' (pen.); Taylor 41'; Wijndal (yellow card) 90+2'	Report	Ihattaren 86'	Stadium: Johan Cruyff Arena (roof closed); Attendance: 54,055; Referee: Alex Bos

19 January 2025 19	Heerenveen	0–2	Ajax	Heerenveen
14:30 CET (UTC+1)	Jahanbakhsh (yellow card) 87'	Report	Šutalo 20'; Fitz-Jim (yellow card) 44'; Akpom 82'	Stadium: Abe Lenstra Stadion; Attendance: 25,248; Referee: Joey Kooij

2 February 2025 21	Ajax	2–1	Feyenoord	Amsterdam
14:30 CET (UTC+1)	Brobbey 37'; Hato (yellow card) 72'; Weghorst (penalty missed) 75'; Regeer (yellow card) 83'; Taylor 90+4', (yellow card) 90+5'	Report	Hwang (yellow card) 45'; Timber 67'; Trauner (yellow card) 72'	Stadium: Johan Cruyff Arena (roof open); Attendance: 54,913; Referee: Danny Makkelie

9 February 2025 22	Fortuna Sittard	0–2	Ajax	Sittard
14:30 CET (UTC+1)	Peterson (yellow card) 59'; Koopmans (yellow card) 67'; Skingraven (yellow card) 90'	Report	Fitz-Jim (yellow card) 33'; Henderson (yellow card) 42'; Berghuis (penalty missed) 68'; Weghorst 68'; Edvardsen (yellow card) 84'; Rasmussen 90+4'	Stadium: Fortuna Sittard Stadion; Attendance: 12,240; Referee: Dennis Higler

16 February 2025 23	Ajax	4–0	Heracles	Amsterdam
16:45 CET (UTC+1)	Godts 17'; Brobbey 42'; Edvardsen 56'; Klaassen 66'	Report		Stadium: Johan Cruyff Arena (roof open); Attendance: 54,439; Referee: Marc Nagtegaal

23 February 2025 20	Ajax	2–0	Go Ahead Eagles	Amsterdam
14:30 CET (UTC+1)	Kaplan (yellow card) 32'; Godts (yellow card) 36'; Brobbey 56'; Edvardsen 87'	Report	Nauber (yellow card) 8' (yellow-red card) 67'	Stadium: Johan Cruyff Arena (roof open); Attendance: 54,871; Referee: Joey Kooij
Note: This match was originally scheduled for 26 January, 16:45 CET (UTC+1)

2 March 2025 24	Almere City	0–1	Ajax	Almere
14:30 CET (UTC+1)	Haye (yellow card) 54'	Report	Taylor 8'	Stadium: Yanmar Stadion; Attendance: 4,212; Referee: Serdar Gözübüyük

9 March 2025 25	PEC Zwolle	0–1	Ajax	Zwolle
14:30 CET (UTC+1)	Thomas (yellow card) 32'	Report	Taylor 61' (pen.)	Stadium: MAC³PARK Stadion; Attendance: 14,000; Referee: Bas Nijhuis

16 March 2025 26	Ajax	2–2	AZ	Amsterdam
16:45 CET (UTC+1)	Taylor (yellow card) 22'; Gaaei 58', (red card) 74'; Edvardsen 85'	Report	Penetra (yellow card) 32' (yellow-red card) 74'; Buurmeester 52'; Belić (yellow card) 54'; Clasie (yellow card) 58'; Sadiq 83'	Stadium: Johan Cruyff Arena (roof open); Attendance: 54,215; Referee: Dennis Higler

30 March 2025 27	PSV	0–2	Ajax	Eindhoven
14:30 CEST (UTC+2)	Lang (yellow card) 75'	Report	Klaassen 35'; Brobbey (yellow card) 36'; Taylor (yellow card) 58'; Traoré 67'	Stadium: Philips Stadion; Attendance: 34,400; Referee: Serdar Gözübüyük

6 April 2025 28	Ajax	3–1	NAC Breda	Amsterdam
16:45 CEST (UTC+2)	Taylor 32' (pen.); Berghuis 35'; Mokio (yellow card) 69', (goal) 76'	Report	Sauer 9'; Kortsmit (yellow card) 31'; Greiml (yellow card) 62'; Leemans (yellow card) 62'; Balard (yellow card) 72'; Sowah (yellow card) 87'	Stadium: Johan Cruyff Arena (roof open); Attendance: 53,420; Referee: Danny Makkelie

13 April 2025 29	Willem II	1–2	Ajax	Tilburg
16:45 CEST (UTC+2)	Mathijsen (yellow card) 8'; Kehrer 41'	Report	Edvardsen 74'; Weghorst 78'	Stadium: Koning Willem II Stadion; Attendance: 14,000; Referee: Marc Nagtegaal

20 April 2025 31	Utrecht	4–0	Ajax	Utrecht
12:15 CEST (UTC+2)	Haller 29'; Aaronson (yellow card) 45', (goal) 85'; Rodríguez 52', 63'	Report	Henderson (yellow card) 39'; Brobbey (yellow card) 56'; Traoré (yellow card) 70'	Stadium: Stadion Galgenwaard; Attendance: 22,516; Referee: Bas Nijhuis
Note: This match was originally scheduled for 4 May 2025. It was rescheduled because of safety risk and the availability of the police then.

27 April 2025 30	Ajax	1–1	Sparta Rotterdam	Amsterdam
14:30 CEST (UTC+2)	Rugani (yellow card) 52'; Regeer 90+7'	Report	Van Aanholt (yellow card) 27'; Kitolano (yellow card) 36'; Nassoh 90+5'	Stadium: Johan Cruyff Arena (roof open); Attendance: 54,676; Referee: Rob Dieperink

11 May 2025 32	Ajax	0–3	NEC	Amsterdam
16:45 CEST (UTC+2)	Gaaei (yellow card) 30'; Fitz-Jim (yellow card) 64'; Berghuis (yellow card) 90+3'	Report	Márquez (yellow card) 27'; Van Crooij (yellow card) 37'; Pereira (yellow card) 38', (goal) 67'; Hansen 59'; Verdonk (yellow card) 69'; Ouaissa 82'	Stadium: Johan Cruyff Arena (roof open); Attendance: 54,535; Referee: Serdar Gözübüyük

14 May 2025 33	Groningen	2–2	Ajax	Groningen
20:00 CEST (UTC+2)	Van Bergen 52'; Bacuna (yellow card) 55'; Ekdal (yellow card) 81'; Valente (red card) 90+3'; Seuntjens (yellow card) 90+4'; Willumsson (yellow card) 90+5'; Vaessen (yellow card) 90+9'; Blokzijl 90+9'	Report	Gaaei 27', (yellow card) 83'; Weghorst 68'; Henderson (yellow card) 72'; Hato (yellow card) 90+4'	Stadium: Euroborg; Attendance: 22,525; Referee: Jeroen Manschot

18 May 2025 34	Ajax	2–0	Twente	Amsterdam
14:30 CEST (UTC+2)	Henderson 28'; Weghorst 90'	Report	Steijn (yellow card) 40'; Verschueren (yellow card) 68'	Stadium: Johan Cruyff Arena (roof open); Attendance: 53,609; Referee: Danny Makkelie

=== KNVB Cup ===
19 December 2024 Second round	Ajax	2–0	Telstar	Amsterdam
21:00 CET (UTC+1)	Fitz-Jim (yellow card) 45+2'; Rugani 64'; Akpom 86'	Report	Bakker (yellow card) 45+2'	Stadium: Johan Cruyff Arena (roof closed); Attendance: 53,017; Referee: Sander van der Eijk

14 January 2025 Round of 16	AZ	2–0	Ajax	Alkmaar
18:45 CET (UTC+1)	Goes 36'; Koopmeiners (yellow card) 81'; Meerdink 89'	Report	Traoré (yellow card) 77'; Baas (yellow card) 90+3'	Stadium: AFAS Stadion; Attendance: 15,032; Referee: Serdar Gözübüyük

=== UEFA Europa League ===
==== Second qualifying round ====
The second qualifying round draw was held on 19 June 2024.

25 July 2024 First leg	Ajax (Netherlands)	1–0	(Serbia) Vojvodina	Amsterdam, Netherlands
20:30 CEST	Hato (yellow card) 47'; Akpom (yellow card) 50'; Taylor (yellow card) 54'; Van den Boomen 86'	Report	Crnomarković (yellow card) 21'; Petrović (yellow card) 46'	Stadium: Johan Cruyff Arena (roof closed); Attendance: 53,590; Referee: César Soto Grado (Spain)

1 August 2024 Second leg	Vojvodina (Serbia)	1–3 (1–4 agg.)	(Netherlands) Ajax	Bačka Topola, Serbia
20:00 CEST	Vukanović (yellow card) 37'; Nikolić 59'	Report	Taylor (yellow card) 30'; Šutalo 53'; Hato 85'; Traoré 90+2'	Stadium: TSC Arena; Attendance: 4,412; Referee: Arda Kardeşler (Turkey)

==== Third qualifying round ====
The third qualifying round draw was held on 22 July 2024.

8 August 2024 First leg	Panathinaikos (Greece)	0–1	(Netherlands) Ajax	Athens, Greece
21:00 EEST	Ingason (yellow card) 45+2'; Mancini (yellow card) 45+2'; Ioannidis (yellow card) 75'; Arão (yellow card) 80'; Đuričić (yellow card) 84'	Report	Berghuis 28'; Šutalo (yellow card) 59'	Stadium: Olympic Stadium; Attendance: 24,452; Referee: Filip Glova (Slovakia)

15 August 2024 Second leg	Ajax (Netherlands)	0–1 (a.e.t.) (1–1 agg.) (13–12 p)	(Greece) Panathinaikos	Amsterdam, Netherlands
20:15 CEST	Akpom (yellow card) 53'; Henderson (yellow card) 105'	Report	Bakasetas (yellow card) 6'; Ioannidis (yellow card) 75'; Mladenović (yellow card) 79'; Tetê 89', (yellow card) 105'; Jeremejeff (yellow card) 90+4'; Mancini (yellow card) 105'; Maksimović (yellow card) after extra time'	Stadium: Johan Cruyff Arena (roof open); Attendance: 54,089; Referee: Chris Kavanagh (England)
	Penalties
	Bergwijn (penalty scored); Van den Boomen (penalty scored); Godts (penalty scored); Taylor (penalty scored); Brobbey (penalty missed); Henderson (penalty scored); Traoré (penalty missed); Baas (penalty missed); Gaaei (penalty scored); Šutalo (penalty scored); Pasveer (penalty scored); Bergwijn (penalty scored); Van den Boomen (penalty scored); Godts (penalty scored); Taylor (penalty scored); Brobbey (penalty missed); Gaaei (penalty scored)		(penalty missed) Mancini; (penalty scored) Jeremejeff; (penalty scored) Tetê; (penalty scored) Jedvaj; (penalty scored) Mladenović; (penalty scored) Vilhena; (penalty missed) Maksimović; (penalty missed) Ingason; (penalty scored) Vagiannidis; (penalty scored) Zeca; (penalty scored) Drągowski; (penalty scored) Mancini; (penalty scored) Jeremejeff; (penalty scored) Tetê; (penalty scored) Jedvaj; (penalty missed) Mladenović; (penalty missed) Vilhena

==== Play–off round ====
The play–off round draw was held on 5 August 2024.

22 August 2024 First leg	Jagiellonia Białystok (Poland)	1–4	(Netherlands) Ajax	Białystok, Poland
20:45 CEST	Diéguez 5', (yellow card) 68'	Report	Akpom 9', 61', 69' (pen.); Godts 27' (penalty missed) 79'; Taylor (yellow card) 48'; Hato (yellow card) 54'	Stadium: Jagiellonia Stadium; Attendance: 19,553; Referee: Rade Obrenovič (Slovenia)

29 August 2024 Second leg	Ajax (Netherlands)	3–0 (7–1 agg.)	(Poland) Jagiellonia Białystok	Amsterdam, Netherlands
20:00 CEST	Henderson (yellow card) 32'; Fitz-Jim 43'; Taylor 64'; Brobbey 71'	Report	Romanczuk (yellow card) 30'	Stadium: Johan Cruyff Arena (roof open); Attendance: 54,010; Referee: Maurizio Mariani (Italy)

==== League phase ====
The draw for the league phase was held on 30 August 2024.

===== League phase table =====
Pos	Team	Pld	W	D	L	GF	GA	GD	Pts	Qualification
10	(Royal Belgian Football Association) Anderlecht	8	4	2	2	14	12	+2	14	Advance to knockout phase play-offs (seeded)
11	(Romanian Football Federation) FCSB	8	4	2	2	10	9	+1	14	Advance to knockout phase play-offs (seeded)
12	(Royal Dutch Football Association) Ajax	8	4	1	3	16	8	+8	13	Advance to knockout phase play-offs (seeded)
13	(Royal Spanish Football Federation) Real Sociedad	8	4	1	3	13	9	+4	13	Advance to knockout phase play-offs (seeded)
14	(Turkish Football Federation) Galatasaray	8	3	4	1	19	16	+3	13	Advance to knockout phase play-offs (seeded)

Source: UEFA
Rules for classification: League phase tiebreakers

Round	1	2	3	4	5	6	7	8
Ground	H	A	A	H	A	H	A	H
Result	W	D	W	W	L	L	L	W
Position	1	6	4	2	6	11	16	12

Source: UEFA
A = Away; H = Home; W = Win; D = Draw; L = Loss

===== Matches =====
26 September 2024 1	Ajax (Netherlands)	4–0	(Turkey) Beşiktaş	Amsterdam
21:00 CEST (UTC+2)	Fitz-Jim (yellow card) 21', (goal) 31'; Hato (yellow card) 46'; Godts 51', 73'; Taylor 55'	Report	Hekimoğlu (yellow card) 45+1'; Onana (yellow card) 51'	Stadium: Johan Cruyff Arena (roof closed); Attendance: 54,010; Referee: John Brooks (England)

3 October 2024 2	Slavia Prague (Czech Republic)	1–1	(Netherlands) Ajax	Prague, Czech Republic
18:45 CEST (UTC+2)	Holeš (yellow card) 9'; Prebsl (yellow card) 27'; Douděra (yellow card) 66'; Chorý 67'	Report	Van den Boomen 18' (pen.), (yellow card) 78'; Hato (yellow card) 35'; Baas (yellow card) 47' (yellow-red card) 75'; Taylor (yellow card) 69'; Wijndal (yellow card) 90'; Gaaei (yellow card) 90+1'	Stadium: Fortuna Arena; Attendance: 19,296; Referee: Andris Treimanis (Latvia)

24 October 2024 3	Qarabağ (Azerbaijan)	0–3	(Netherlands) Ajax	Baku, Azerbaijan
18:45 CEST (UTC+2)	Romão (red card) 15'; Cəfərquliyev (yellow card) 16' (yellow-red card) 79'; Hüseynov (yellow card) 22'; Benzia (yellow card) 45+5'; Medina (yellow card) 73'; Janković (yellow card) 80'	Report	Taylor (yellow card) 20', (goal) 36'; Fitz-Jim (yellow card) 45+1'; Weghorst 74' (pen.); Akpom 77'	Stadium: Tofiq Bahramov Republican Stadium; Attendance: 27,520; Referee: Nick Walsh (Scotland)

7 November 2024 4	Ajax (Netherlands)	5–0	(Israel) Maccabi Tel Aviv	Amsterdam
21:00 CET (UTC+1)	Traoré 14'; Taylor 27', (yellow card) 43'; Godts 39'; Brobbey 61'; Fitz-Jim 69'; Wijndal (yellow card) 82'; Henderson (yellow card) 90'	Report	Kanichowsky (yellow card) 26'; Addo (yellow card) 86'; Patati (yellow card) 90+1'	Stadium: Johan Cruyff Arena (roof closed); Attendance: 53,719; Referee: Ondřej Berka (Czech Republic)

28 November 2024 5	Real Sociedad (Spain)	2–0	(Netherlands) Ajax	San Sebastián, Spain
21:00 CET (UTC+1)	Méndez (yellow card) 21'; Barrentexea 67'; Kubo 85'; Aramburu (yellow card) 90'; Muñoz (yellow card) 90+2'	Report	Wijndal (yellow card) 81'; Van den Boomen (yellow card) 89'	Stadium: Anoeta; Attendance: 32,786; Referee: Matej Jug (Slovenia)

12 December 2024 6	Ajax (Netherlands)	1–3	(Italy) Lazio	Amsterdam
21:00 CET (UTC+1)	Hato (yellow card) 38'; Brobbey (yellow card) 45+1'; Traoré 47'; Weghorst (yellow card) 82'	Report	Tchaouna 12'; Rovella (yellow card) 45+2'; Pellegrini (yellow card) 46'; Dele-Bashiru 52'; Pedro 77'; Gigot (yellow card) 82'	Stadium: Johan Cruyff Arena (roof closed); Attendance: 50,127; Referee: Ivan Kružliak (Slovakia)

23 January 2025 7	RFS (Latvia)	1–0	(Netherlands) Ajax	Riga, Latvia
21:00 CET (UTC+1)	Markhiyev (yellow card) 37', (goal) 78'; Savaļnieks (yellow card) 54'; Panić (yellow card) 67'	Report	Van den Boomen (yellow card) 83'	Stadium: Daugava Stadium; Attendance: 10,223; Referee: Marian Barbu (Romania)

30 January 2025 8	Ajax (Netherlands)	2–1	(Turkey) Galatasaray	Amsterdam
21:00 CET (UTC+1)	Traoré 23', (yellow card) 72'; Fitz-Jim 58'	Report	Osimhen (yellow card) 38', (goal) 90+4'; Torreira (yellow card) 53'; Sánchez (yellow card) 79'	Stadium: Johan Cruyff Arena (roof open); Attendance: 54,100; Referee: Jesús Gil Manzano (Spain)

==== Knockout phase ====
===== Knockout phase play-offs =====
The draw for the knockout phase play-offs was held on 31 January 2025.

13 February 2025 First leg	Union Saint-Gilloise (Belgium)	0–2	(Netherlands) Ajax	Brussels, Belgium
18:45 CET (UTC+1)	Mac Allister (yellow card) 79'	Report	Rasmussen 59'; Mokio (yellow card) 62', (goal) 71'	Stadium: King Baudouin Stadium; Attendance: 10,853; Referee: Donatas Rumšas (Lithuania)

20 February 2025 Second leg	Ajax (Netherlands)	1–2 (a.e.t.) (3–2 agg.)	(Belgium) Union Saint-Gilloise	Amsterdam, Netherlands
21:00 CET (UTC+1)	Klaassen (red card) 25'; Lucas Rosa (yellow card) 32'; Gaaei (yellow card) 59'; Henderson (yellow card) 62'; Kaplan (yellow card) 71'; Taylor 93' (pen.), (yellow card) 101'; Hato (yellow card) 120+5'	Report	Mac Allister 16', (yellow card) 99'; David 28' (pen.); Boufal (yellow card) 59'; Sadiki (yellow card) 73'; Khalaili (yellow card) 93'; Burgess (yellow card) 105'; Van de Perre (yellow card) 120+5'	Stadium: Johan Cruyff Arena (roof open); Attendance: 51,835; Referee: Chris Kavanagh (England)

===== Round of 16 =====
The draw for the round of 16 was held on 21 February 2025.

6 March 2025 First leg	Ajax (Netherlands)	1–2	(Germany) Eintracht Frankfurt	Amsterdam, Netherlands
21:00 CET (UTC+1)	Brobbey 10'; Traoré (yellow card) 68'; Henderson (yellow card) 90'	Report	Larsson 27'; Skhiri (yellow card) 34', (goal) 70'; Collins (yellow card) 38'	Stadium: Johan Cruyff Arena (roof open); Attendance: 52,641; Referee: Simone Sozza (Italy)

13 March 2025 Second leg	Eintracht Frankfurt (Germany)	4–1 (6–2 agg.)	(Netherlands) Ajax	Frankfurt, Germany
18:45 CET (UTC+1)	Bahoya 7'; Götze 25', 82'; Ekitike 67'	Report	Taylor 78'	Stadium: Waldstadion; Attendance: 57,500; Referee: Irfan Peljto (Bosnia and Herzegovina)

== Statistics ==
=== Appearances and goals ===
No.	Pos	Nat	Player	Total		Eredivisie		KNVB Cup		Europa League	
No.	Pos	Nat	Player	Apps	Goals	Apps	Goals	Apps	Goals	Apps	Goals
2	DF	(Brazil) BRA	Lucas Rosa	8	0	3+2	0	0	0	3	0
3	DF	(Denmark) DEN	Anton Gaaei	41	3	19+6	3	1	0	5+10	0
4	DF	(Netherlands) NED	Jorrel Hato	50	3	30+1	2	2	0	16+1	1
5	DF	(Netherlands) NED	Owen Wijndal	13	0	3+7	0	0	0	0+3	0
6	MF	(England) ENG	Jordan Henderson	45	1	21+7	1	2	0	13+2	0
8	MF	(Netherlands) NED	Kenneth Taylor	52	15	29+4	9	1+1	0	14+3	6
9	FW	(Netherlands) NED	Brian Brobbey	44	7	22+8	4	2	0	9+3	3
11 (39)	FW	(Belgium) BEL	Mika Godts	47	8	20+9	4	2	0	9+7	4
12	GK	(Netherlands) NED	Jay Gorter	1	0	0	0	0	0	0+1	0
13	DF	(Turkey) TUR	Ahmetcan Kaplan	12	0	7+1	0	1	0	1+2	0
15	DF	(Netherlands) NED	Youri Baas	39	1	23	1	1	0	15	0
16	GK	(Brazil) BRA	Matheus	10	0	9	0	0	0	1	0
17	MF	(Norway) NOR	Oliver Edvardsen	15	4	1+10	4	0	0	3+1	0
18	MF	(Netherlands) NED	Davy Klaassen	35	8	24+7	8	1+1	0	2	0
19	FW	(Netherlands) NED	Julian Rijkhoff	1	0	0	0	0	0	0+1	0
20	FW	(Burkina Faso) BFA	Bertrand Traoré	49	10	20+12	6	2	0	8+7	4
21	MF	(Netherlands) NED	Branco van den Boomen	26	2	7+5	0	0+1	0	3+10	2
22	GK	(Netherlands) NED	Remko Pasveer	43	0	24	0	2	0	17	0
23	FW	(Netherlands) NED	Steven Berghuis	42	3	16+10	2	1+1	0	8+6	1
24 (26)	DF	(Italy) ITA	Daniele Rugani	26	1	7+8	0	2	1	6+3	0
25	FW	(Netherlands) NED	Wout Weghorst	31	11	9+15	10	0+2	0	1+4	1
27	FW	(Netherlands) NED	Amourricho van Axel Dongen	0	0	0	0	0	0	0	0
28	MF	(Netherlands) NED	Kian Fitz-Jim	44	6	12+15	2	2	0	13+2	4
29	FW	(Denmark) DEN	Christian Rasmussen	22	2	1+9	1	0+1	0	6+5	1
31	DF	(Belgium) BEL	Jorthy Mokio	18	2	4+7	1	0	0	4+3	1
36	DF	(Netherlands) NED	Dies Janse	6	0	3+2	0	0	0	1	0
37	DF	(Croatia) CRO	Josip Šutalo	45	3	28+1	2	0	0	15+1	1
44	MF	(Netherlands) NED	Youri Regeer	4	1	1+3	1	0	0	0	0
59	FW	(Netherlands) NED	Don-Angelo Konadu	5	0	1+2	0	0	0	1+1	0
63	MF	(Netherlands) NED	Sean Steur	1	0	0+1	0	0	0	0	0
64	MF	(Belgium) BEL	Rayane Bounida	1	0	0+1	0	0	0	0	0
Players sold or loaned out after the start of the season:
1	GK	(Argentina) ARG	Gerónimo Rulli	0	0	0	0	0	0	0	0
2	DF	(Netherlands) NED	Devyne Rensch	26	1	13+1	1	1	0	11	0
7	FW	(Netherlands) NED	Steven Bergwijn	4	0	0+1	0	0	0	1+2	0
10	FW	(Nigeria) NGR	Chuba Akpom	32	8	9+7	3	0+2	1	6+8	4
11	FW	(Portugal) POR	Carlos Forbs	6	0	0+1	0	0	0	5	0
16	MF	(Norway) NOR	Sivert Mannsverk	2	0	2	0	0	0	0	0
18	DF	(Croatia) CRO	Jakov Medić	0	0	0	0	0	0	0	0
24	DF	(Netherlands) NED	Silvano Vos	0	0	0	0	0	0	0	0
25	DF	(Croatia) CRO	Borna Sosa	0	0	0	0	0	0	0	0
30	DF	(Argentina) ARG	Gastón Ávila	0	0	0	0	0	0	0	0
33	MF	(Bosnia and Herzegovina) BIH	Benjamin Tahirović	2	0	1	0	0	0	0+1	0
35	FW	(Turkey) TUR	Naci Ünüvar	0	0	0	0	0	0	0	0
38	MF	(Iceland) ISL	Kristian Hlynsson	9	1	3+1	1	0+1	0	1+3	0
40	GK	(Germany) GER	Diant Ramaj	1	0	1	0	0	0	0	0
49	FW	(Netherlands) NED	Jaydon Banel	3	0	1	0	0	0	0+2	0

Source: Competitive matches

=== Goalscorers ===
Rank	No	Pos	Nat	Name	Eredivisie	KNVB Cup	Europa League	Total
1	8	MF	(Netherlands)	Kenneth Taylor	9	0	6	15
2	25	FW	(Netherlands)	Wout Weghorst	10	0	1	11
3	20	FW	(Burkina Faso)	Bertrand Traoré	6	0	4	10
4	10	FW	(Nigeria)	Chuba Akpom	3	1	4	8
4	18	MF	(Netherlands)	Davy Klaassen	8	0	0	8
4	39	FW	(Belgium)	Mika Godts	4	0	4	8
7	9	FW	(Netherlands)	Brian Brobbey	4	0	3	7
8	28	MF	(Netherlands)	Kian Fitz-Jim	2	0	4	6
9	17	FW	(Norway)	Oliver Valaker Edvardsen	4	0	0	4
10	3	DF	(Denmark)	Anton Gaaei	3	0	0	3
10	4	DF	(Netherlands)	Jorrel Hato	2	0	1	3
10	37	DF	(Croatia)	Josip Šutalo	2	0	1	3
10	23	FW	(Netherlands)	Steven Berghuis	2	0	1	3
14	21	MF	(Netherlands)	Branco van den Boomen	0	0	2	2
14	29	FW	(Denmark)	Christian Rasmussen	1	0	1	2
14	31	DF	(Belgium)	Jorthy Mokio	1	0	1	2
17	2	DF	(Netherlands)	Devyne Rensch	1	0	0	1
17	6	MF	(England)	Jordan Henderson	1	0	0	1
17	15	DF	(Netherlands)	Youri Baas	1	0	0	1
17	24	DF	(Italy)	Daniele Rugani	0	1	0	1
17	38	MF	(Iceland)	Kristian Hlynsson	1	0	0	1
17	44	MF	(Netherlands)	Youri Regeer	1	0	0	1
Own goal					1	0	0	1
Totals					67	2	33	102

Source: Competitive matches

=== Clean sheets ===
Rank	No	Pos	Nat	Name	Eredivisie	KNVB Cup	Europa League	Total
1	22	GK	(Netherlands)	Remko Pasveer	11	1	7	19
2	16	GK	(Brazil)	Matheus	4	0	0	4
3	40	GK	(Germany)	Diant Ramaj	1	0	0	1
4	12	GK	(Netherlands)	Jay Gorter	0	0	0	0
Total					16	1	7	24

Source: Competitive matches

=== Disciplinary record ===
N	P	Nat.	Name	Eredivisie			KNVB Cup			Europa League			Total			Notes
N	P	Nat.	Name	Yellow card	Second yellow card	Red card	Yellow card	Second yellow card	Red card	Yellow card	Second yellow card	Red card	Yellow card	Second yellow card	Red card	Notes
2	DF	(Netherlands)	Devyne Rensch	2						1			3			
3	DF	(Denmark)	Anton Gaaei	5		1				2			7		1	
4	DF	(Netherlands)	Jorrel Hato	6						5	1		11	1		
5	DF	(Netherlands)	Owen Wijndal	2						3			5			
6	MF	(England)	Jordan Henderson	6						5			11			
8	MF	(Netherlands)	Kenneth Taylor	3						7			10			
9	FW	(England)	Brian Brobbey	6						1			7			
10	FW	(Nigeria)	Chuba Akpom							2			2			
11	FW	(Belgium)	Mika Godts	2									2			
13	DF	(Turkey)	Ahmetcan Kaplan	2						1			3			
15	DF	(Netherlands)	Youri Baas	2			1				1		3	1		
16	MF	(Norway)	Sivert Mannsverk	1									1			
17	MF	(Norway)	Oliver Edvardsen	1									1			
18	MF	(Netherlands)	Davy Klaassen									1			1	
20	FW	(Burkina Faso)	Bertrand Traoré	1			1			2			4			
21	MF	(Netherlands)	Branco van den Boomen							3			3			
23	MF	(Netherlands)	Steven Berghuis	2									2			
24	DF	(Italy)	Daniele Rugani	1									1			
25	FW	(Netherlands)	Wout Weghorst	2						1			3			
28	MF	(Netherlands)	Kian Fitz-Jim	3			1			2			6			
29	MF	(Denmark)	Christian Rasmussen	1									1			
31	DF	(Belgium)	Jorthy Mokio	1						1			2			
37	DF	(Croatia)	Josip Šutalo	3						1			4			
44	MF	(Netherlands)	Youri Regeer	1			1						2			

Source: Competitive matches
Only competitive matches
(yellow card) = Number of bookings; (second yellow card) = Number of sending offs after a second yellow card; (red card) = Number of sending offs by a direct red card.
