= Owen Wijndal =

Dutch footballer (born 1999)

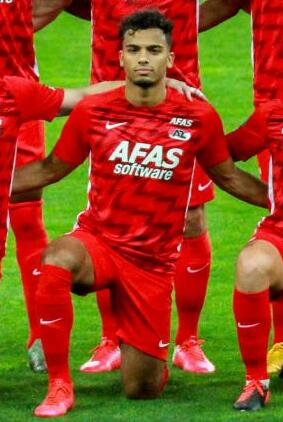
- Wijndal with AZ in 2020

Personal information
- Date of birth: 28 November 1999 (age 26)
- Place of birth: Zaandam, Netherlands
- Height: 1.76 m (5 ft 9 in)
- Position: Left-back

Team information
- Current team: Ajax
- Number: 5

Youth career
- ZVV Zaandijk
- –2010: HFC Haarlem
- 2010–2018: AZ

Senior career*
Years	Team	Apps	(Gls)
2016–2019	Jong AZ	59	(2)
2017–2022	AZ	105	(3)
2022–	Ajax	56	(1)
2023–2024	→ Antwerp (loan)	29	(1)

International career
2013–2014	Netherlands U15	5	(0)
2014	Netherlands U16	3	(0)
2015–2016	Netherlands U17	12	(0)
2015	Netherlands U18	3	(0)
2016–2018	Netherlands U19	15	(0)
2018–2019	Netherlands U20	6	(0)
2019	Netherlands U21	6	(0)
2020–2021	Netherlands	11	(0)
- * Club domestic league appearances and goals as of 25 October 2026

Owen Wijndal (born 28 November 1999) is a Dutch professional footballer who plays as a left-back for Eredivisie club Ajax.

== Club career ==
=== AZ ===
Born in Zaandam, Wijndal joined the AZ youth academy at the age of 10, having formerly played for local sides ZVV Zaandijk and HFC Haarlem. He was promoted to the second team for the 2016–17 season playing in the third-tier Tweede Divisie. On 4 February 2017, Wijndal made his first-team debut for AZ, starting in a 4–2 home loss to PSV Eindhoven in the Eredivisie due to injuries to regular starter Ridgeciano Haps and backup Thomas Ouwejan. The end of the 2016–17 season saw AZ end on sixth place and thereby qualifying for domestic play-offs for participation in the third qualifying round of the Europa League the following season. They eventually missed out on European football, losing to FC Utrecht on penalties after two legs. That season, Wijndal also made 24 league appearances for the reserves, helping them win the third division title and thereby reach promotion to the second tier.

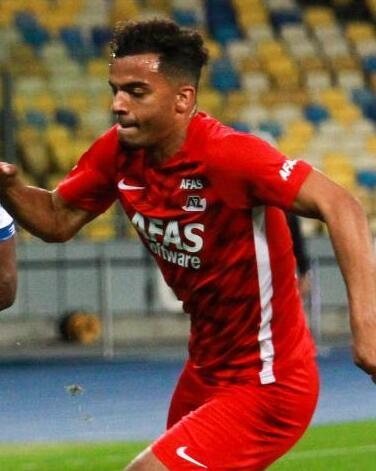
Owen Wijndal playing for AZ Alkmaar in 2020

During the 2017–18 season, Wijndal featured in the first-team side more regularly, making seven league appearances, while also playing 16 times for the reserves in the Eerste Divisie. At the end of the season he signed a new five-year deal with AZ on 22 June 2018. After featuring mainly for Jong AZ in 2018–19, he established himself as the regular starting left-back for the first team during the 2019–20 season. On 25 July 2019, Wijndal also made his debut in the Europa League against BK Häcken. He scored his first professional goal on 7 March 2020 in a 4–0 league win over ADO Den Haag.

Ahead of the 2021–22 season, Wijndal was appointed captain of AZ following the departure of Teun Koopmeiners. He made 143 appearances for AZ's first team, scoring 4 goals.

=== Ajax ===
On 12 July 2022, Wijndal joined Eredivisie club Ajax on a five-year deal for a reported fee of €10 million. He made his debut on 30 July, starting in the Johan Cruyff Shield against PSV. Wijndal provided two assists before being substituted in the 62nd minute as Ajax lost 5–3. He began the 2022–23 season as the starting left-back but faced competition for his place and inconsistent form, resulting in him making 28 appearances across all competitions during a difficult season for the club.

==== Loan to Royal Antwerp ====
On 5 September 2023, Wijndal was sent on a season-long loan to reigning Belgian Pro League champions Royal Antwerp for the 2023–24 season. He featured regularly for Antwerp, making 26 league appearances and scoring his only goal for the club against Charleroi on 6 April 2024. He also gained valuable experience playing in all six of Antwerp's UEFA Champions League group stage matches. At the end of the season-long loan, he returned to Ajax.

==== Return to Ajax ====
Wijndal returned to Ajax for the 2024–25 season under new manager Francesco Farioli. He served primarily as a rotation option and backup at left-back, competing with Jorrel Hato. He made appearances predominantly as a substitute in the Eredivisie and UEFA Europa League during the first half of the season. On 7 December 2025, Wijndal scored his first Ajax goal against Fortuna Sittard.

== International career ==
Born in the Netherlands to a Surinamese mother and Dutch father, Wijndal is eligible for both Suriname and Netherlands. He has represented the Netherlands at every age group from under-15 to under-21 level. Between 2015 and 2016, he made 12 appearances for the Netherlands under-17 team, and participated in the 2016 UEFA European Under-17 Championship in Azerbaijan where he made five appearances. The Dutch team made the semi-finals, where they stranded against Portugal.

Wijndal was a regular starter for the Netherlands under-19 team between 2016 and 2018, making 16 appearances for the team. In the same period, he also appeared for the Netherlands under-20 team. On 31 May 2019, Wijndal made his debut for the Netherlands under-21 team in a friendly match against Mexico in Doetinchem that ended in a 5–1 win for the Dutch.

Wijndal was called up to the senior Netherlands squad for the UEFA Nations League matches against Poland and Italy in September 2020.

On 7 October 2020, he made his first appearance for the Netherlands in the friendly match against Mexico which Mexico won 1–0.

== Career statistics ==
=== Club ===
As of match played 25 October 2026

Appearances and goals by club, season and competition
Club	Season	League			National cup (Note: Includes KNVB Cup, Belgian Cup)		Europe		Other		Total	
Club	Season	Division	Apps	Goals	Apps	Goals	Apps	Goals	Apps	Goals	Apps	Goals
Jong AZ	2016–17	Tweede Divisie	24	0	—		—		—		24	0
Jong AZ	2017–18	Eerste Divisie	16	2	—		—		—		16	2
Jong AZ	2018–19	Eerste Divisie	19	0	—		—		—		19	0
Jong AZ	Total		59	2	—		—		—		59	2
AZ	2016–17	Eredivisie	1	0	0	0	0	0	—		1	0
AZ	2017–18	Eredivisie	7	0	0	0	—		—		7	0
AZ	2018–19	Eredivisie	8	0	2	0	0	0	—		10	0
AZ	2019–20	Eredivisie	24	1	1	0	14 (Note: Appearances in UEFA Europa League)	0	—		39	1
AZ	2020–21	Eredivisie	34	1	1	0	8 (Note: Two appearances in UEFA Champions League, six appearances and one goal in UEFA Europa League)	1	—		43	2
AZ	2021–22	Eredivisie	31	1	4	0	8 (Note: Appearances in UEFA Europa Conference League)	0	—		43	1
AZ	Total		105	3	8	0	30	1	—		143	4
Ajax	2022–23	Eredivisie	20	0	4	0	3 (Note: Two appearances in UEFA Champions League, one appearance in UEFA Europa League)	0	1 (Note: Appearance in Johan Cruyff Shield)	0	28	0
Ajax	2023–24	Eredivisie	2	0	0	0	2	0	—		4	0
Ajax	2024–25	Eredivisie	10	0	0	0	3	0	—		13	0
Ajax	2025–26	Eredivisie	19	1	2	1	6 (Note: Appearances in UEFA Champions League)	0	0	0	27	2
Ajax	2026–27	Eredivisie	5	0	0	0	6 (Note: Appearances in UEFA Conference League)	1	—		11	1
Ajax	Total		56	1	6	1	19	1	1	0	83	3
Antwerp (loan)	2023–24	Belgian Pro League	26	1	5	0	6	0	—		37	1
Career total			246	7	19	1	56	2	1	0	322	10

=== International ===
As of match played 17 June 2021

Appearances and goals by national team and year
National team	Year	Apps	Goals
Netherlands	2020	4	0
Netherlands	2021	7	0
Total		11	0

== Honours ==
Individual

- Eredivisie Player of the Month: May 2021
- Eredivisie Talent of the Month: August 2019, November 2019, November 2020, December 2020
