= Anton Gaaei =

Danish footballer (born 2002)

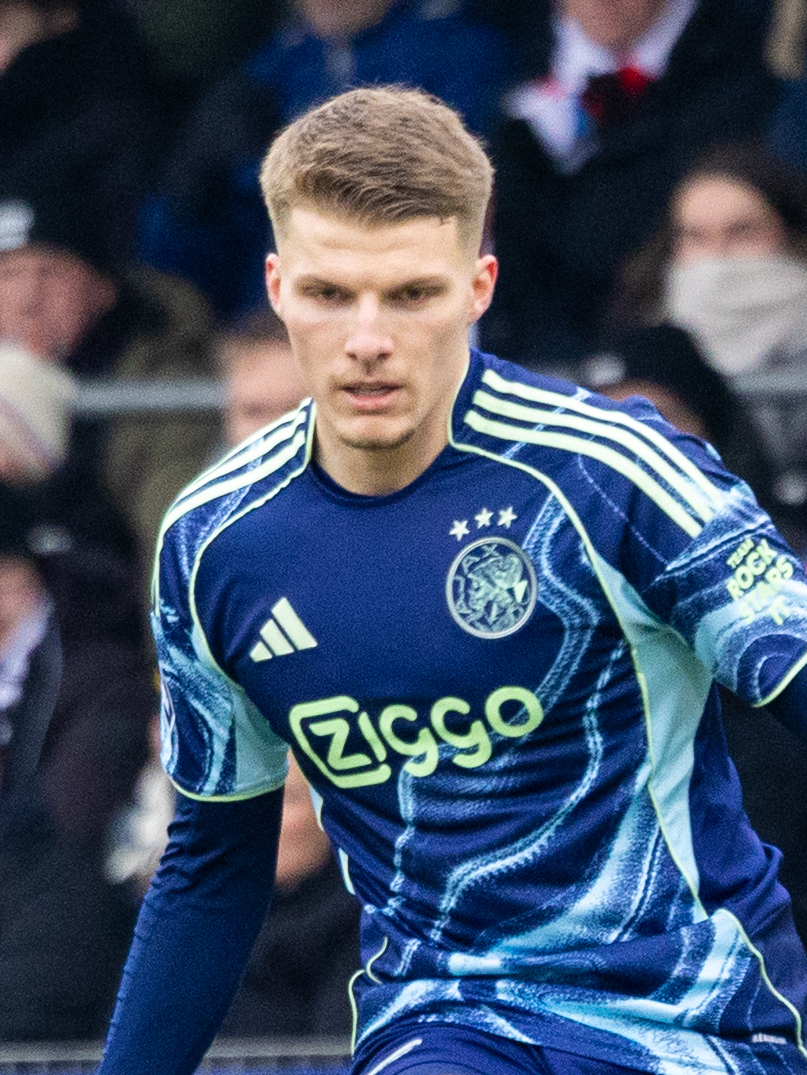
- Gaeei playing for Ajax in 2026

Personal information
- Date of birth: 19 November 2002 (age 23)
- Place of birth: Viborg, Denmark
- Height: 1.83 m (6 ft 0 in)
- Position: Right-back

Team information
- Current team: Ajax
- Number: 3

Youth career
- Bruunshåb/Tapdrup IF
- Overlund GF
- Viborg

Senior career*
Years	Team	Apps	(Gls)
2020–2023	Viborg	38	(0)
2023–	Ajax	80	(5)
2023–	Jong Ajax	8	(0)

International career^{‡}
2022	Denmark U20	2	(0)
2023–2025	Denmark U21	18	(0)
2025–	Denmark	2	(0)
- * Club domestic league appearances and goals as of 22:00, 19 September 2026 (UTC) ‡ National team caps and goals as of 18:40, 5 October 2026 (UTC)

Anton Gaaei (Danish pronunciation: [ˈænˌtsʰʌn ˈkɑjˀ], born 19 November 2002) is a Danish professional footballer who plays as a right-back for Eredivisie club Ajax and the Denmark national team.

== Club career ==
=== Viborg FF ===
Anton Gaaei started his career in Bruunshåb/Tapdrup IF and then passed by Overlund GF, before he moved to Viborg. From the summer 2020, Gaaei began training regular with the first team. On 2 September 2020, Gaaei got his official debut for Viborg, as he came on from the bench in the 76th minute against FC Fredericia in the Danish Cup. Three months later, in December 2020, Gaaei signed a new deal with Viborg until June 2023.

In his youth, Gaaei was primarily a winger, but was later converted to right-back. On 1 April 2022, Gaaei got his league debut for Viborg and Danish Superliga debut in a game an against SønderjyskE. Gaaei ended the 2021–22 season with six league appearances. He became a regular starter in the 2022–23 season, making 37 appearances across all competitions.

=== Ajax ===
On 17 August 2023, Gaaei officially joined Eredivisie side Ajax for a reported fee of DKr35 million (about €4.5 million), signing a five-year contract with the Dutch club. In the process, he broke the transfer record as Viborg's highest-grossing sale.

Gaaei made his competitive debut for the club on 3 September 2023, replacing Devyne Rensch in the 62nd minute of a 0–0 away league draw against Fortuna Sittard. He faced criticism for his early performances, with analysts highlighting defensive frailties. In De Klassieker against Feyenoord on 24 September, Gaaei started but made two errors leading to goals and was substituted after only 32 minutes. On 25 February 2024, in a match against AZ, Gaaei was again substituted in the first half. Despite these difficulties, he scored his first goal for the club with a volley against Go Ahead Eagles in April 2024, which won the club's Goal of the Month award. He finished his debut season with 34 first-team appearances across all competitions, while also featuring 8 times for Jong Ajax in the Eerste Divisie.

Gaaei began the 2024–25 season positively by scoring the decisive penalty in the record-breaking 34-penalty shootout against Panathinaikos in the UEFA Europa League third qualifying round on 15 August 2024. Under new manager Francesco Farioli, Gaaei established himself as a regular part of the first-team squad, competing for the starting right-back position and making frequent appearances. He scored his first two Eredivisie goals for Ajax during the season, netting twice by mid-March 2025. He also provided a key assist during De Klassieker against Feyenoord on 2 February 2025, contributing to Ajax's 2–1 victory.

== International career ==
Gaaei represented Denmark at the under-20 level, earning two caps in 2022. He made his debut for the Denmark U21 team in November 2022. He subsequently became a regular for the U21 side, participating in friendly matches and the qualification campaign for the 2025 UEFA European Under-21 Championship. As of March 2025, he had earned 14 caps for the under-21 team.

== Personal life ==
Anton Gaaei is the son of former Viborg FF player, Carsten Gaaei, who later also coached at several clubs.

== Career statistics ==
=== Club ===
As of match played 19 September 2026

Appearances and goals by club, season and competition
Club	Season	League			National cup (Note: Includes Danish Cup)		Continental		Other		Total	
Club	Season	Division	Apps	Goals	Apps	Goals	Apps	Goals	Apps	Goals	Apps	Goals
Viborg	2021–22	Danish Superliga	6	0	1	0	—		—		7	0
Viborg	2022–23	Danish Superliga	28	0	4	1	5 (Note: Appearances in UEFA Europa Conference League)	0	—		37	1
Viborg	2023–24	Danish Superliga	4	0	0	0	—		—		4	0
Viborg	Total		38	0	5	1	5	0	—		46	1
Ajax	2023–24	Eredivisie	25	1	1	0	8 (Note: Five appearances in UEFA Europa League, three appearances in UEFA Europa Conference League)	0	—		34	1
Ajax	2024–25	Eredivisie	25	3	1	0	14 (Note: Appearances in UEFA Europa League)	0	—		40	3
Ajax	2025–26	Eredivisie	26	1	2	1	7 (Note: Appearances in UEFA Champions League)	1	1 (Note: Appearance in European play-offs)	0	36	3
Ajax	2026–27	Eredivisie	4	0	0	0	3	1	—		7	1
Ajax	Total		80	5	4	1	32	2	1	0	117	8
Jong Ajax	2023–24	Eerste Divisie	8	0	—		—		—		8	0
Career total			126	5	9	2	37	2	1	0	171	9

=== International ===
As of match played 4 October 2026

Appearances and goals by national team and year
National team	Year	Apps	Goals
Denmark	2025	1	0
Denmark	2026	1	0
Total		2	0
