= Jorrel Hato =

Dutch footballer (born 2006)

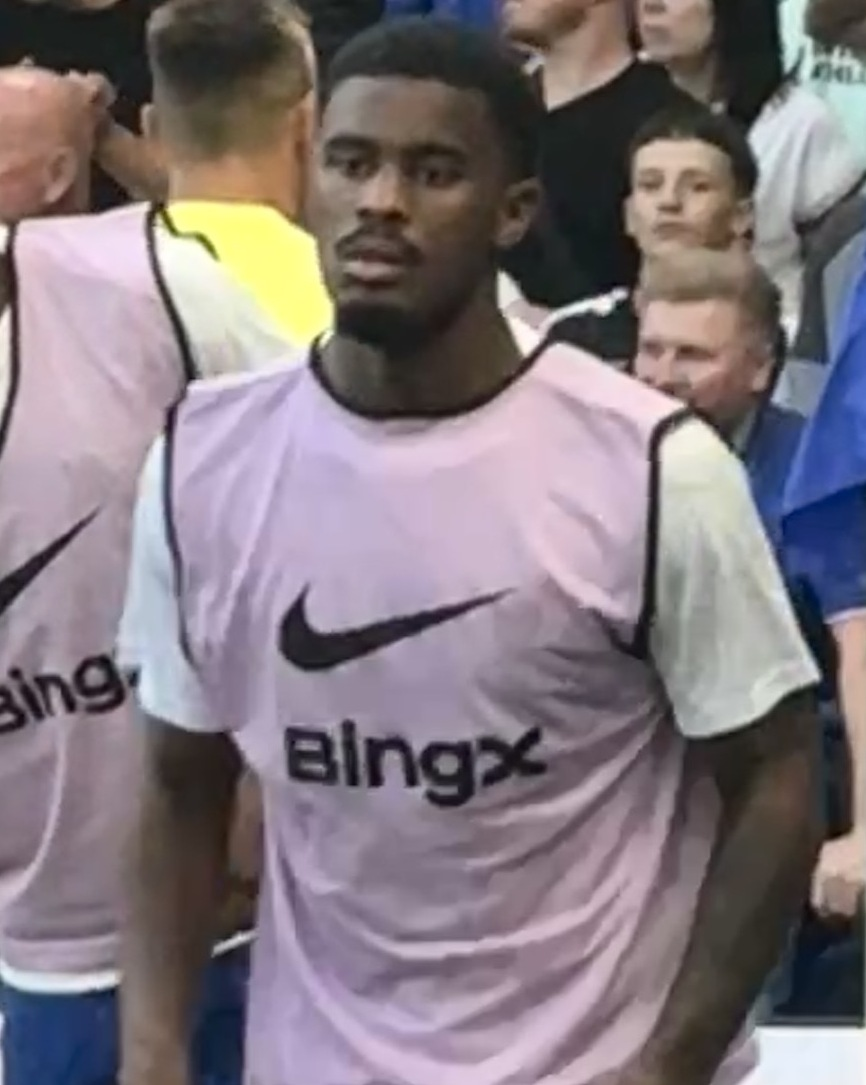
- Hato playing for Chelsea in 2025

Personal information
- Full name: Jorrel Evan Hato
- Date of birth: 7 March 2006 (age 20)
- Place of birth: Rotterdam, Netherlands
- Height: 1.82 m (6 ft 0 in)
- Positions: Centre-back; left-back

Team information
- Current team: Chelsea
- Number: 21

Youth career
- 2013–2018: Sparta Rotterdam
- 2018–2022: Ajax

Senior career*
| Years | Team | Apps | (Gls) |
| 2022–2023 | Jong Ajax | 13 | (1) |
| 2023–2025 | Ajax | 75 | (3) |
| 2025– | Chelsea | 28 | (0) |

International career^{‡}
| 2021–2022 | Netherlands U16 | 6 | (0) |
| 2022–2023 | Netherlands U17 | 4 | (0) |
| 2023– | Netherlands U21 | 11 | (0) |
| 2023– | Netherlands | 10 | (0) |
- * Club domestic league appearances and goals as of 22:45, 24 October 2026 (UTC) ‡ National team caps and goals as of 20:43, 4 October 2026 (UTC)

Jorrel Evan Hato (born 7 March 2006) is a Dutch professional footballer who plays as a centre-back or left-back for Premier League club Chelsea and the Netherlands national team.

== Club career ==
=== Early career ===
Born in Rotterdam, Hato moved from the youth academy of Sparta Rotterdam to Ajax in 2018.

=== Ajax ===
==== 2022–23: Debut season ====
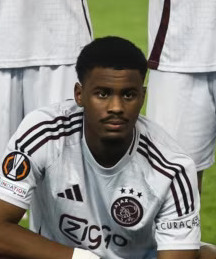
Hato with Ajax in 2024.

In March 2022, Hato signed his first professional contract, keeping him with Ajax until July 2025 despite reported interest from other European clubs. As captain of the Ajax under-19 team in the UEFA Youth League, he scored a notable solo goal against Napoli in October 2022. He made his professional debut for Jong Ajax in the Eerste Divisie on 4 November 2022, coming on as a substitute against FC Dordrecht.

On 11 January 2023, Hato made his senior competitive debut for Ajax in the KNVB Cup against Den Bosch, appearing as a second-half substitute in a 2–0 win. On 5 February 2023, he made his Eredivisie debut as a substitute against SC Cambuur, becoming the third youngest player to debut for Ajax in the league (16 years, 335 days) behind Ryan Gravenberch and Clarence Seedorf. Five days later, on 10 February, he scored his first professional goal while playing for Jong Ajax in an Eerste Divisie match away against FC Den Bosch. Hato quickly gained more first-team opportunities and started the 2023 KNVB Cup final against PSV Eindhoven on 30 April 2023. Following his debut season, Hato was awarded the Abdelhak Nouri Trophy as the most talented player from Ajax's youth academy.

==== 2023–2025: First-team regular and vice-captain ====
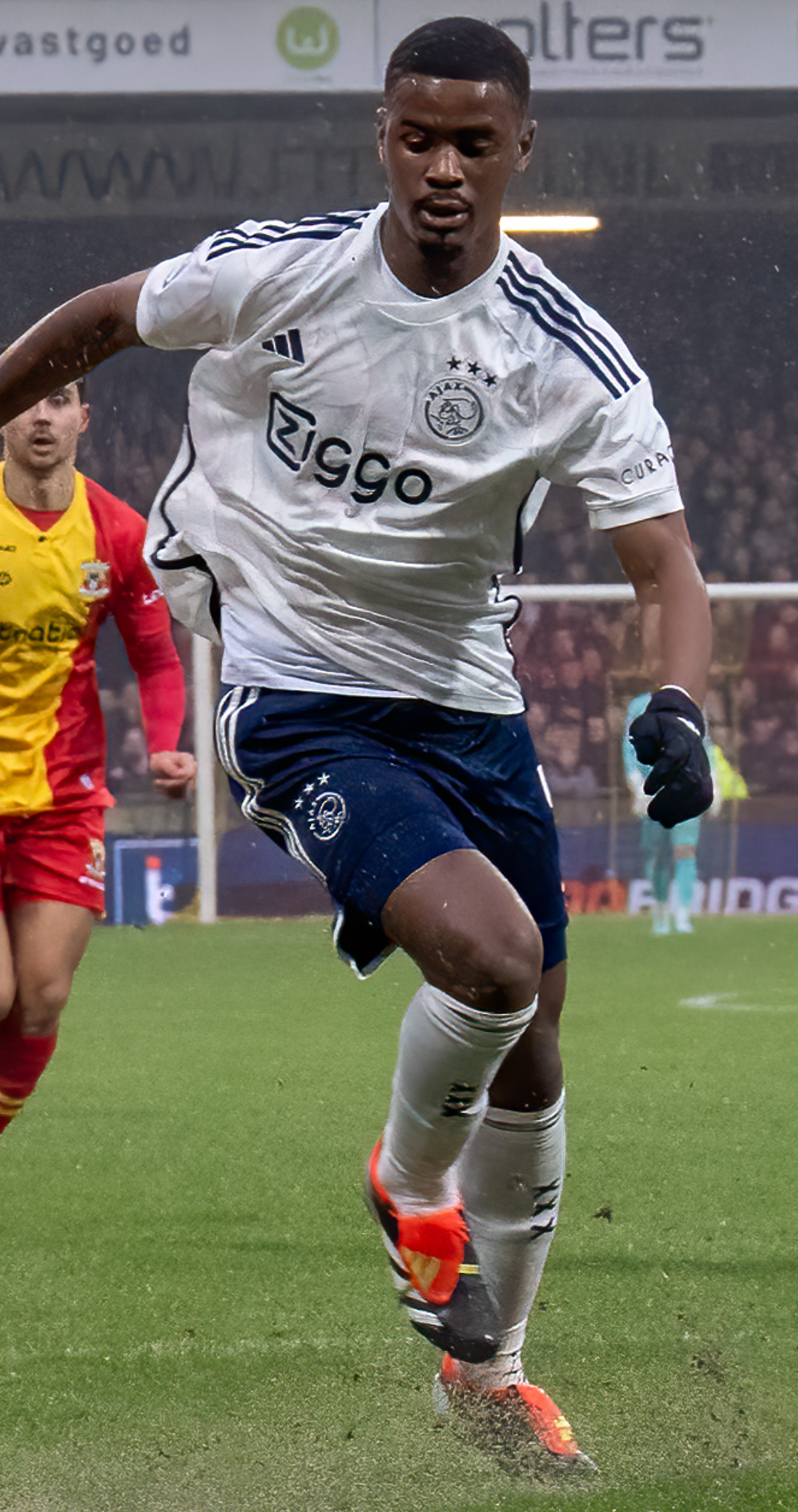
Hato with Ajax in 2024.

Hato became an undisputed starter and key player for Ajax at the beginning of the 2023–24 season. Despite the team's struggles, the 17-year-old played almost every minute of the campaign across all competitions, earning praise for his consistent performances and maturity. In October 2023, he was named by English newspaper The Guardian as one of the best players born in 2006 worldwide. He scored his first senior goal for Ajax against Vitesse on 25 November 2023. Following the departure of Davy Klaassen and Dušan Tadić, and injuries to Steven Bergwijn and Steven Berghuis, Hato was appointed as one of the team's vice-captains. On 14 December 2023, he captained Ajax against AEK Athens in the Europa League, becoming the club's youngest-ever captain in a European match at 17 years and 282 days old. In recognition of his rapid development and importance, Hato signed a new contract extension with Ajax on 12 March 2024, keeping him at the club until June 2028.

Hato continued his role as a key defender in the 2024–25 season under new manager Francesco Farioli, playing primarily at centre-back but also providing cover at left-back. He contributed offensively as well, scoring twice in the Eredivisie and once in the UEFA Europa League by mid-March 2025. At the end of the season, he was named Eredivisie Talent of the Year.

=== Chelsea ===
On 3 August 2025, Hato joined Premier League club Chelsea signing a seven-year contract for an initial fee of £35.5m. On 10 January 2026, he scored his first goal for Chelsea, the opener in a 5–1 away win against Charlton Athletic in the third round of the FA Cup.

== International career ==
In November 2021, he was included in the Dutch under-16 squad. He became captain of the under-16 Dutch team in 2022.

After brief spells with the U17 and U21 teams, Hato was called up to the senior Netherlands squad for UEFA Euro 2024 qualifying matches against Republic of Ireland and Gibraltar in November 2023. He made his debut on 21 November 2023 as a half-time substitute for Virgil van Dijk in the 6–0 win against Gibraltar. Following his debut, Hato continued to be part of the senior setup, earning four more caps during 2024. His sixth cap came as a substitute in the UEFA Nations League Finals quarter-final second leg against Spain on 23 March 2025.

On 27 May 2026, Hato was named in the Netherlands' squad for the 2026 FIFA World Cup.

== Personal life ==
Hato was born in the Netherlands to a Curaçaoan father and Cape Verdean mother.

== Career statistics ==
=== Club ===
As of match played 24 October 2026

Appearances and goals by club, season and competition
| Club | Season | League | | | National cup (Note: Includes KNVB Cup, FA Cup) | | League cup (Note: Includes EFL Cup) | | Europe | | Total | |
| Club | Season | Division | Apps | Goals | Apps | Goals | Apps | Goals | Apps | Goals | Apps | Goals |
|---|---|---|---|---|---|---|---|---|---|---|---|---|
| Jong Ajax | 2022–23 | Eerste Divisie | 13 | 1 | — | | — | | — | | 13 | 1 |
| Ajax | 2022–23 | Eredivisie | 11 | 0 | 4 | 0 | — | | 0 | 0 | 15 | 0 |
| Ajax | 2023–24 | Eredivisie | 33 | 1 | 1 | 0 | — | | 12 (Note: Eight appearances in UEFA Europa League, four appearances in UEFA Europa Conference League) | 0 | 46 | 1 |
| Ajax | 2024–25 | Eredivisie | 31 | 2 | 2 | 0 | — | | 17 (Note: Appearances in UEFA Europa League) | 1 | 50 | 3 |
| Ajax | Total | | 75 | 3 | 7 | 0 | — | | 29 | 1 | 111 | 4 |
| Chelsea | 2025–26 | Premier League | 22 | 0 | 5 | 2 | 5 | 0 | 4 (Note: Appearances in UEFA Champions League) | 0 | 36 | 2 |
| Chelsea | 2026–27 | Premier League | 6 | 0 | 0 | 0 | 1 | 0 | — | | 7 | 0 |
| Chelsea | Total | | 28 | 0 | 5 | 2 | 6 | 0 | 4 | 0 | 43 | 2 |
| Career total | | | 116 | 4 | 12 | 2 | 6 | 0 | 33 | 1 | 167 | 7 |

=== International ===
As of match played 4 October 2026

Appearances and goals by national team and year
| National team | Year | Apps | Goals |
|---|---|---|---|
| Netherlands | 2023 | 1 | 0 |
| Netherlands | 2024 | 4 | 0 |
| Netherlands | 2025 | 1 | 0 |
| Netherlands | 2026 | 4 | 0 |
| Total | | 10 | 0 |

== Honours ==
Ajax

- KNVB Cup runner-up: 2022–23

Chelsea

- FA Cup runner-up: 2025–26

Individual

- Abdelhak Nouri Trophy: 2022–23
- Eredivisie Talent of the Month: August 2023
- Eredivisie Talent of the Year: 2024–25
- Marco van Basten Award: 2024–25
