= 2023–24 AFC Ajax season =

Dutch football club season

AFC Ajax
2023–24 season
- Owner: AFC Ajax N.V. (Euronext Amsterdam: AJAX)
- CEO: Jan van Halst (interim, until 15 March); Alex Kroes (from 15 March on, from 2 April suspended, stepped down 25 April, new Technical Director); Menno Geelen (interim, from 10 May)
- Head coach: Maurice Steijn (until 23 October); Hedwiges Maduro (caretaker, 23−30 October); John van 't Schip (interim, from 30 October); Michael Valkanis (caretaker, 17−21 December)
- Stadium: Johan Cruyff Arena
- Eredivisie: 5th
- KNVB Cup: Second round
- UEFA Europa League: Group stage
- UEFA Europa Conference League: Round of 16
- Top goalscorer: League: Brian Brobbey (18); All: Brian Brobbey (22)
- Highest home attendance: 55,076 (vs Excelsior, 24 April 2024; Eredivisie)
- Lowest home attendance: 48,250 (vs Vitesse, 25 November 2023; Eredivisie)
- Average home league attendance: 53,744
- Biggest win: 5–0 (vs Vitesse (H); 25 November 2023; Eredivisie)
- Biggest defeat: 0–6 (vs Feyenoord (A); 7 April 2024; Eredivisie)
Home colours	Away colours	Third colours

The 2023–24 season was the 124th season in the history of AFC Ajax and their 68th consecutive season in the top flight. The club participated in the Eredivisie, KNVB Cup, UEFA Europa League and UEFA Europa Conference League.

== Players ==
=== Squad ===
As of 1 February 2024

Note: Flags indicate national team as defined under FIFA eligibility rules; some limited exceptions apply. Players may hold more than one non-FIFA nationality.

No.	Pos.	Nation	Player
1	GK	ARG	Gerónimo Rulli
2	DF	NED	Devyne Rensch
3	DF	DEN	Anton Gaaei
4	DF	NED	Jorrel Hato
6	MF	ENG	Jordan Henderson (3rd captain)
7	FW	NED	Steven Bergwijn (captain)
8	MF	NED	Kenneth Taylor
9	FW	NED	Brian Brobbey
10	FW	NGR	Chuba Akpom
11	FW	POR	Carlos Forbs
12	GK	NED	Jay Gorter
13	DF	TUR	Ahmetcan Kaplan
16	MF	NOR	Sivert Mannsverk
18	DF	CRO	Jakov Medić

No.	Pos.	Nation	Player
19	FW	NED	Julian Rijkhoff
21	MF	NED	Branco van den Boomen
22	GK	NED	Remko Pasveer
23	FW	NED	Steven Berghuis (vice-captain)
24	DF	NED	Silvano Vos
25	DF	CRO	Borna Sosa
27	FW	NED	Amourricho van Axel Dongen
28	MF	NED	Kian Fitz-Jim
30	DF	ARG	Gastón Ávila
33	MF	BIH	Benjamin Tahirović
37	DF	CRO	Josip Šutalo
38	MF	ISL	Kristian Hlynsson
39	FW	BEL	Mika Godts
40	GK	GER	Diant Ramaj

== Transfers ==
=== In ===
Date	Pos.	Player	Transferred from	Fee	Ref.
29 May 2023	MF	(Netherlands) Branco van den Boomen	(France) Toulouse	Free transfer	
18 June 2023	MF	(Bosnia and Herzegovina) Benjamin Tahirović	(Italy) Roma	€8,000,000	
3 August 2023	GK	(Germany) Diant Ramaj	(Germany) Eintracht Frankfurt	€8,000,000	
3 August 2023	FW	(Portugal) Carlos Forbs	(England) Manchester CIty	€14,000,000	
6 August 2023	DF	(Croatia) Jakov Medić	(Germany) St. Pauli	€2,000,000	
16 August 2023	FW	(England) Chuba Akpom	(England) Middlesbrough	€12,300,000	
17 August 2023	DF	(Denmark) Anton Gaaei	(Denmark) Viborg	€4,500,000	
20 August 2023	DF	(Croatia) Josip Šutalo	(Croatia) Dinamo Zagreb	€20,500,000	
22 August 2023	DF	(Argentina) Gastón Ávila	(Belgium) Antwerp	€12,500,000	
30 August 2023	FW	(Georgia (country)) Georges Mikautadze	(France) Metz	€16,000,000	
1 September 2023	DF	(Belgium) Ethan Butera	(Belgium) Anderlecht	€1,500,000	
1 September 2023	MF	(Norway) Sivert Mannsverk	(Norway) Molde	€6,000,000	
1 September 2023	DF	(Croatia) Borna Sosa	(Germany) VfB Stuttgart	€8,000,000	
18 January 2024	MF	(England) Jordan Henderson	(Saudi Arabia) Al-Ettifaq	Free transfer	
1 February 2024	FW	(Netherlands) Julian Rijkhoff	(Germany) Borussia Dortmund	€1,400,000	

=== Out ===
Date	Pos.	Player	Transferred to	Fee	Ref.
8 May 2023	FW	(Netherlands) Sontje Hansen	(Netherlands) NEC	Undisclosed	
18 May 2023	GK	(Netherlands) Maarten Stekelenburg	Retired	–	
24 May 2023	MF	(Netherlands) Youri Regeer	(Netherlands) Twente	€900,000	
30 June 2023	FW	(Ecuador) Patrickson Delgado	(Ecuador) Independiente del Valle	End of loan	
30 June 2023	FW	(Italy) Lorenzo Lucca	(Italy) Pisa	End of loan	
30 June 2023	MF	(Austria) Florian Grillitsch	(Germany) 1899 Hoffenheim	Free transfer	
11 July 2023	DF	(Netherlands) Kik Pierie	(Netherlands) Excelsior	Undisclosed	
14 July 2023	DF	(Netherlands) Jurriën Timber	(England) Arsenal	€40,000,000	
14 July 2023	FW	(Serbia) Dušan Tadić	(Turkey) Fenerbahçe	Free transfer	
28 July 2023	DF	(Nigeria) Calvin Bassey	(England) Fulham	€22,500,000	
10 August 2023	MF	(Mexico) Edson Álvarez	(England) West Ham United	€38,000,000	
11 August 2023	FW	(Denmark) Mohamed Daramy	(France) Reims	€12,000,000	
27 August 2023	FW	(Ghana) Mohammed Kudus	(England) West Ham United	€43,000,000 (Note: Fee may eventually rise to €46,000,000 due to bonuses.)	
1 September 2023	MF	(Netherlands) Davy Klaassen	(Italy) Inter Milan	Free transfer	
8 January 2024	MF	(Belgium) Stanis Idumbo Muzambo	(Spain) Sevilla	€400,000	
1 February 2024	DF	(Netherlands) Anass Salah-Eddine	(Netherlands) Twente	€1,000,000	

=== Loans in ===
Start date	Pos.	Player	From	End date	Fee	Ref.

=== Loans out ===
Date	Pos.	Player	To	End date	Fee	Ref.
24 June 2023	MF	(Turkey) Naci Ünüvar	(Netherlands) Twente	30 June 2024	Undisclosed	
28 June 2023	MF	(Netherlands) Youri Baas	(Netherlands) NEC	30 June 2024	Undisclosed	
29 August 2023	DF	(Mexico) Jorge Sánchez	(Portugal) Porto	30 June 2024	Undisclosed	
30 August 2023	MF	(Netherlands) Kian Fitz-Jim	(Netherlands) Excelsior	11 January 2024 (Note: Loan agreed initially until 30 June 2024, but it was terminated in January.)	Undisclosed	
1 September 2023	FW	(Portugal) Francisco Conceição	(Portugal) Porto	30 June 2024	Undisclosed	
1 September 2023	FW	(Denmark) Christian Rasmussen	(Denmark) Nordsjælland	30 June 2024	Undisclosed	
5 September 2023	DF	(Netherlands) Owen Wijndal	(Belgium) Antwerp	30 June 2024	Undisclosed	
4 January 2024	FW	(Georgia (country)) Georges Mikautadze	(France) Metz	30 June 2024	Undisclosed	

== Pre-season and friendlies ==
Win Draw Loss Cancelled/ suspended Fixtures

8 July 2023 Friendly	Ajax (Netherlands)	2–2	(Netherlands) Den Bosch	Ouder-Amstel, Netherlands
13:00 CEST (UTC+2)	Misehouy 74'; Kalokoh 78'	Report	Vicario 16'; Laros (yellow card) 64'; Keijser 71'; Akanni (yellow card) 87'	Stadium: Sportpark De Toekomst; Referee: Shona Shukrula

18 July 2023 Friendly	Ajax (Netherlands)	3–0	(Ukraine) Shakhtar Donetsk	Ouder-Amstel, Netherlands
14:00 CEST (UTC+2)	Kudus 19' (pen.), 34'; Bergwijn 32'	Report		Stadium: Sportpark De Toekomst; Attendance: 150; Referee: Robin Hensgens (Netherlands)

22 July 2023 Friendly	Anderlecht (Belgium)	3–0	(Netherlands) Ajax	Brussels, Belgium
13:30 CEST (UTC+2)	Dolberg 12'; Aertssen 80' (o.g.); Raman 90+4'	Report	Klaassen (yellow card) 36'; Aertssen (yellow card) 64'; Bergwijn (yellow card) 66'; Taylor (yellow card) 74'	Stadium: Lotto Park; Attendance: 20,000; Referee: Jasper Vergoote (Belgium)

25 July 2023 Friendly	Unterhaching (Germany)	3–5	(Netherlands) Ajax	Herzogenaurach, Germany
17:00 CEST (UTC+2)	Skarlatidis 2'; Schwabl 36'; Grob (yellow card) 41'; Hoops (yellow card) 81'; Gottmeier 85'	Report	Brobbey 39' (pen.); Hlynsson 55'; Godts 64'; Tahirović 71'; Bergwijn 73'	Stadium: Adi-Dassler-Sportplatz; Referee: Christopher Knauer (Germany)

29 July 2023 Friendly	FC Augsburg (Germany)	3–1	(Netherlands) Ajax	Augsburg, Germany
15:00 CEST (UTC+2)	Rulli 42' (o.g.); Tietz (yellow card) 45+1'; Michel 69', 76' (pen.)	Report	Brobbey 56' (pen.)	Stadium: Augsburg Arena; Attendance: 14,207; Referee: Robert Hartmann (Germany)

6 August 2023 Friendly	Borussia Dortmund (Germany)	3–1	(Netherlands) Ajax	Dortmund, Germany
14:00 CEST (UTC+2)	Brandt 6'; Nmecha 54', 60'	Report	Brobbey 7' (yellow card) 89'; Kudus (yellow card) 38'; Van den Boomen (yellow card) 79'	Stadium: Signal Iduna Park; Attendance: 80,500; Referee: Florian Exner (Germany)

14 August 2023 Friendly	Ajax (Netherlands)	0–1	(Netherlands) Go Ahead Eagles	Ouder-Amstel, Netherlands
13:00 CEST (UTC+2)		Report	Baeten 34'	Stadium: Sportpark De Toekomst

6 January 2024 Friendly	Hannover 96 (Germany)	3–0	(Netherlands) Ajax	Arcos de la Frontera, Spain
16:00 CET (UTC+1)	Börner 5'; Nielsen 40'; Damar 44'			Stadium: Estadio Antonio Gallardo

7 January 2024 Friendly	Hannover 96 (Germany)	1–2	(Netherlands) Ajax	Arcos de la Frontera, Spain
13:00 CET (UTC+1)	Damar 42'	Report	Brobbey 24'; Bergwijn 26'	Stadium: Estadio Antonio Gallardo

== Competitions ==
=== Overall record ===
Competition	First match	Last match	Starting round	Final position	Record							
Competition	First match	Last match	Starting round	Final position	Pld	W	D	L	GF	GA	GD	Win %
Eredivisie	12 August 2023	19 May 2024	Matchday 1	5th	34	15	11	8	74	61	+13	44.12
KNVB Cup	21 December 2023		Second round	Second round	1	0	0	1	2	3	−1	0.00
UEFA Europa League	24 August 2023	14 December 2023	Play-off round	Group stage	8	2	2	4	14	15	−1	25.00
UEFA Europa Conference League	15 February 2024	14 March 2024	Knockout round play-offs	Round of 16	4	1	2	1	4	7	−3	25.00
Total					47	18	15	14	94	86	+8	38.30

Source: Soccerway

=== Eredivisie ===
==== League table ====
Pos	Team	Pld	W	D	L	GF	GA	GD	Pts	Qualification or relegation
3	Twente	34	21	6	7	69	36	+33	69	Qualification for the Champions League third qualifying round
4	AZ	34	19	8	7	70	39	+31	65	Qualification for the Europa League league stage (Note: The 2023–24 KNVB Cup winners qualified for the Europa League league stage. Since the cup winners (Feyenoord) qualified based on league position, the Europa League spot was passed to the fourth-placed team.)
5	Ajax	34	15	11	8	74	61	+13	56	Qualification for the Europa League second qualifying round
6	NEC	34	14	11	9	68	51	+17	53	Qualification for the European competition play-offs
7	Utrecht	34	13	11	10	49	47	+2	50	Qualification for the European competition play-offs

Source: Eredivisie
Rules for classification: Season in progress: 1) Most points won; 2) Less points lost; 3) Goal difference; 4) Goals scored; 5) Alphabetical order; End of season: 1) Points; 2) Goal difference; 3) Goals scored; 4) Head-to-head points; 5) Head-to-head goal difference; 6) Head-to-head away goals scored; 7) Play-off if relevant for deciding champion, relegation or participating in a European league, otherwise by draw. 8) Penalty shoot-out (only after a play-off)

==== Results summary ====
Overall								Home						Away					
Pld	W	D	L	GF	GA	GD	Pts	W	D	L	GF	GA	GD	W	D	L	GF	GA	GD
34	15	11	8	74	61	+13	56	9	6	2	39	21	+18	6	5	6	35	40	−5

Source: Eredivisie

==== Results by round ====
Round	1	2	3	4	5	6	7	8	9	10	11	12	13	14	15	16	17	18	19	20	21	22	23	24	25	26	27	28	29	30	31	32	33	34
Ground	H	A	H	A	A	H	A	H	A	A	H	A	H	A	H	H	A	H	A	H	A	H	A	H	H	A	A	H	A	H	H	A	H	A
Result	W	D	W	D	L	L	W	L	L	L	W	D	W	W	W	D	W	W	W	D	L	D	L	W	D	D	W	D	L	W	D	W	W	D
Position	2	5	4	5	6	9	7	7	9	8	8	6	6	6	5	5	5	5	5	5	5	5	5	5	5	5	5	5	6	5	5	5	5	5

Source: Eredivisie
A = Away; H = Home; W = Win; D = Draw; L = Loss

==== Matches ====
The league fixtures were announced on 28 June 2023.

12 August 2023 1	Ajax	4–1	Heracles Almelo	Amsterdam
20:00 CEST (UTC+2)	Medić 45+8'; Tahirović (yellow card) 61'; Rensch (yellow card) 74'; Kudus 75'; Bergwijn 85', 90+6' (pen.)	Report	Hoogma (yellow card) 10'; Engels 45+5', (yellow card) 58'; Ouahim (yellow card) 56'; Bruns (yellow card) 74'; Limbombe (yellow card) 88'	Stadium: Johan Cruyff Arena (roof open); Attendance: 54,029; Referee: Jeroen Manschot

19 August 2023 2	Excelsior	2–2	Ajax	Rotterdam
21:00 CEST (UTC+2)	Horemans 45+1'; Agrafiotis 48'	Report	Brobbey 25'; Klaassen 72'	Stadium: Van Donge & De Roo Stadion; Attendance: 4,400; Referee: Dennis Higler

3 September 2023 4	Fortuna Sittard	0–0	Ajax	Sittard
14:30 CEST (UTC+2)	Noslin (penalty missed) 10'; Dijks (yellow card) 63'; Rosier (yellow card) 90'; Oratmangoen (yellow card) 90+2'	Report	Ávila (yellow card) 36'; Brobbey (yellow card) 45+6'	Stadium: Fortuna Sittard Stadion; Attendance: 12,138; Referee: Sander van der Eijk

17 September 2023 5	FC Twente	3–1	Ajax	Enschede
14:30 CEST (UTC+2)	Rots 7'; Steijn 11'; Sadílek (yellow card) 74'; Ünüvar 79'	Report	Bergwijn (yellow card) 13'; Brobbey 35'; Hato (yellow card) 82'	Stadium: De Grolsch Veste; Attendance: 30,000; Referee: Danny Makkelie

24 September 2023 6	Ajax	0–4	Feyenoord	Amsterdam
14:30 CEST (UTC+2)	Taylor (yellow card) 41'; Vos (yellow card) 66'; Brobbey (yellow card) 80'	Report	Giménez 9', 18', 59', (yellow card) 45+7'; Paixão 37'; Wellenreuther (yellow card) 42'	Stadium: Johan Cruyff Arena (roof open); Attendance: 54,000/ without spectators Referee: Serdar Gözübüyük
Note: The game was abandoned in the 55th minute after it was interrupted twice due to spectator fireworks on the pitch. The game was played to conclusion on 27 September at 14:00 CEST without an audience.

30 September 2023 7	RKC Waalwijk	2–3	Ajax	Waalwijk
21:00 CEST (UTC+2)	Kramer 37'; Meijers (yellow card) 42'; Oukili 51'	Report	Brobbey 30'; Bergwijn 43' (pen.); Berghuis 57'	Stadium: Mandemakers Stadion; Attendance: 7,159; Referee: Pol van Boekel
Note: The game was abandoned in the 84th minute after a medical emergency, related with the RKC goalkeeper Etienne Vaessen. The game was played to conclusion on 6 December at 20:00 CET.

8 October 2023 8	Ajax	1–2	AZ	Amsterdam
14:30 CEST (UTC+2)	Bergwijn (yellow card) 50'; Vos (yellow card) 65'; Van den Boomen 73'	Report	Pavlidis 45'; De Wit 57'; Martins Indi (yellow card) 87'	Stadium: Johan Cruyff Arena (roof open); Attendance: 54,028; Referee: Allard Lindhout

22 October 2023 9	FC Utrecht	4–3	Ajax	Utrecht
12:15 CEST (UTC+2)	Flamingo 44'; Van der Hoorn 48'; Toornstra 71'; Fraulo 90'; Seuntjens (yellow card) 90+4'	Report	Hlynsson 52', 55'; Bergwijn 65' (pen.); Sosa (yellow card) 75'; Tahirović (yellow card) 83'	Stadium: Stadion Galgenwaard; Attendance: 22,198; Referee: Dennis Higler

29 October 2023 10	PSV	5–2	Ajax	Eindhoven
14:30 CET (UTC+1)	Lozano 20', 60', 72'; De Jong 49'; Saibari 52', (yellow card) 90'	Report	Van den Boomen 10'; Hato (yellow card) 13'; Brobbey 40'; Bergwijn (yellow card) 62'	Stadium: Philips Stadion; Attendance: 34,700; Referee: Danny Makkelie

2 November 2023 3	Ajax	2–0	FC Volendam	Amsterdam
20:00 CET (UTC+1)	Bergwijn 57'; Akpom 89'	Report	Twigt (yellow card) 85'	Stadium: Johan Cruyff Arena (roof closed); Attendance: 54,177; Referee: Martin van den Kerkhof
Note: The game was originally scheduled for 27 September, but due to the KNVB decision to play the suspended Klassieker derby to the end on that day, the game against Volendam was moved for a later date.

5 November 2023 11	Ajax	4–1	SC Heerenveen	Amsterdam
16:45 CET (UTC+1)	Bergwijn 25'; Brobbey 42'; Van den Boomen (yellow card) 60'; Akpom 84', 90+2'	Report	Van Amersfoort (yellow card) 40'; Brouwers 45+1'; Olsson (yellow card) 81'	Stadium: Johan Cruyff Arena (roof closed); Attendance: 54,288; Referee: Sander van der Eijk

12 November 2023 12	Almere City	2–2	Ajax	Almere
14:30 CET (UTC+1)	Jacobs (yellow card) 7'; Van Bruggen (yellow card) 15'; Robinet (yellow card) 15', (goal) 90+3' (pen.); Ritmeester van de Kamp 67'; Resink (yellow card) 75'; Koopmeiners (yellow card) 90+5'	Report	Brobbey (yellow card) 15'; Akpom 68'; Tahirović 82'; Rensch (yellow card) 90+1'	Stadium: Yanmar Stadion; Attendance: 4,222; Referee: Bas Nijhuis

25 November 2023 13	Ajax	5–0	Vitesse	Amsterdam
21:00 CET (UTC+1)	Hato 3'; Hlynsson 12'; Oroz 50' (o.g.); Akpom 58'; Taylor 67'; Bergwijn (yellow card) 90+2'	Report	Cornelisse (yellow card) 90+1'; Domgjoni (yellow card) 90+4'	Stadium: Johan Cruyff Arena (roof closed); Attendance: 48,250; Referee: Dennis Higler

3 December 2023 14	NEC	1–2	Ajax	Nijmegen
14:30 CET (UTC+1)	Tavşan 90'	Report	Hlynsson 57'; Forbs 88'	Stadium: Goffertstadion; Attendance: 12,500; Referee: Marc Nagtegaal

9 December 2023 15	Ajax	2–1	Sparta Rotterdam	Amsterdam
18:45 CET (UTC+1)	Brobbey 8'; Bergwijn 42' (pen.)	Report	Neghli 55'; De Guzmán (yellow card) 68'	Stadium: Johan Cruyff Arena (roof closed); Attendance: 54,526; Referee: Danny Makkelie

17 December 2023 16	Ajax	2–2	PEC Zwolle	Amsterdam
16:45 CET (UTC+1)	Brobbey 35', 48'; Berghuis (yellow card) 53'	Report	Velanas (yellow card) 30'; MacNulty (yellow card) 54'; Thy 60', 89'; Vellios (yellow card) 90+2'	Stadium: Johan Cruyff Arena (roof open); Attendance: 53,853; Referee: Joey Kooij

14 January 2024 17	Go Ahead Eagles	2–3	Ajax	Deventer
14:30 CET (UTC+1)	Edvardsen 44'; Kramer 58'	Report	Brobbey 27'; Tahirović 45+4'; Hlynsson (yellow card) 53'; Medić (yellow card) 55'; Rensch 72'	Stadium: De Adelaarshorst; Attendance: 9,997; Referee: Pol van Boekel

21 January 2024 18	Ajax	4–1	RKC Waalwijk	Amsterdam
16:45 CET (UTC+1)	Brobbey 9', 35', (penalty missed) 70'; Tahirović (yellow card) 38'; Hlynsson 64'; Berghuis 87'	Report	Kramer 15'	Stadium: Johan Cruyff Arena (roof open); Attendance: 54,514; Referee: Bas Nijhuis

27 January 2024 19	Heracles Almelo	2–4	Ajax	Almelo
21:00 CET (UTC+1)	Hornkamp 12'; De Keersmaecker (yellow card) 15'; Engels 60'; Cestic (yellow card) 90'	Report	Brobbey 16', 57'; Berghuis 55'; Taylor (yellow card) 81'; Hlynsson 84'	Stadium: Erve Asito; Attendance: 12,080; Referee: Dennis Higler

3 February 2024 20	Ajax	1–1	PSV	Amsterdam
20:00 CET (UTC+1)	Berghuis 19'; Hato (yellow card) 26'	Report	De Jong 34'; Schouten (yellow card) 72'; Ramalho (yellow card) 76'; Lozano (yellow card) 77'	Stadium: Johan Cruyff Arena (roof closed); Attendance: 53,744; Referee: Serdar Gözübüyük

11 February 2024 21	SC Heerenveen	3–2	Ajax	Heerenveen
14:30 CET (UTC+1)	Van Amersfoort 11', 46'; Sahraoui 38'; Van Beek (yellow card) 49'; Köhlert (yellow card) 51'; Braude (yellow card) 65'; Bochniewicz (yellow card) 72'	Report	Bochniewicz 51' (o.g.); Akpom 79'	Stadium: Abe Lenstra Stadion; Attendance: 24,150; Referee: Danny Makkelie

18 February 2024 22	Ajax	2–2	NEC	Amsterdam
14:30 CET (UTC+1)	Brobbey 7', (yellow card) 68'; Forbs 79'; Hlynsson (yellow card) 87'	Report	Hato 61' (o.g.); Rober 90+5'	Stadium: Johan Cruyff Arena (roof closed); Attendance: 53,521; Referee: Bas Nijhuis

25 February 2024 23	AZ	2–0	Ajax	Alkmaar
16:45 CET (UTC+1)	Van Bommel 7', 67'; Bazoer (yellow card) 55'; Goes (yellow card) 79'	Report		Stadium: AFAS Stadion; Attendance: 19,016; Referee: Allard Lindhout

3 March 2024 24	Ajax	2–0	FC Utrecht	Amsterdam
14:30 CET (UTC+1)	Brobbey 39'; Mannsverk (yellow card) 65'; Taylor 77'; Rensch (red card) 83'	Report	Azarkan (yellow card) 36'; Flamingo (yellow card) 42'; Iqbal (yellow card) 86'	Stadium: Johan Cruyff Arena (roof open); Attendance: 53,159; Referee: Sander van der Eijk

10 March 2024 25	Ajax	2–2	Fortuna Sittard	Amsterdam
14:30 CET (UTC+1)	Taylor 8'; Brobbey 88'; Kaplan (yellow card) 90+6'	Report	Duarte 49'; Sierhuis 66'	Stadium: Johan Cruyff Arena (roof open); Attendance: 54,252; Referee: Edwin van de Graaf

17 March 2024 26	Sparta Rotterdam	2–2	Ajax	Rotterdam
16:45 CET (UTC+1)	Verschueren 28', 47'	Report	Akpom 65'; Bergwijn 88'; Taylor (yellow card) 89'; Kaplan (red card) 90+4'	Stadium: Sparta Stadion Het Kasteel; Attendance: 10,599; Referee: Serdar Gözübüyük

31 March 2024 27	PEC Zwolle	1–3	Ajax	Zwolle
12:15 CEST (UTC+2)	Velanas (yellow card) 9'; Lam (yellow card) 38'; Vellios (yellow card) 71'; Krastev 72'; MacNulty (yellow card) 77'	Report	Hlynsson 12'; Akpom 24', 84'; Mannsverk (yellow card) 50'; Vos (yellow card) 89'	Stadium: MAC³PARK Stadion; Attendance: 14,000; Referee: Jeroen Manschot

4 April 2024 28	Ajax	1–1	Go Ahead Eagles	Amsterdam
21:00 CEST (UTC+2)	Gaaei 24'; Hato (yellow card) 57'	Report	Kuipers 90+2'	Stadium: Johan Cruyff Arena (roof open); Attendance: 53,820; Referee: Marc Nagtegaal

7 April 2024 29	Feyenoord	6–0	Ajax	Rotterdam
14:30 CEST (UTC+2)	Paixão 34', 66'; Minteh 35', 56'; Hancko 45+2'; Timber 62'	Report	Kaplan (yellow card) 69'; Tahirović (yellow card) 76'	Stadium: De Kuip; Attendance: 47,500; Referee: Danny Makkelie

14 April 2024 30	Ajax	2–1	FC Twente	Amsterdam
16:45 CEST (UTC+2)	Šutalo (yellow card) 5'; Mannsverk (yellow card) 35'; Brobbey 59'; Bergwijn 81' (pen.)	Report	Van Wolfswinkel 31'; Kjølø (yellow card) 32'	Stadium: Johan Cruyff Arena (roof open); Attendance: 53,718; Referee: Serdar Gözübüyük

24 April 2024 31	Ajax	2–2	Excelsior	Amsterdam
21:00 CEST (UTC+2)	Rensch 27'; Bergwijn (red card) 36'; Tahirović (yellow card) 68'; Gaaei (yellow card) 77'; Akpom 89'	Report	Baas 38' (pen.); Lamprou 53'; Horemans (yellow card) 67'; Benita (yellow card) 73'	Stadium: Johan Cruyff Arena (roof open); Attendance: 55,076; Referee: Sander van der Eijk

5 May 2024 32	FC Volendam	1–4	Ajax	Volendam
14:30 CEST (UTC+2)	Benamar 80'	Report	Taylor 25', 77'; Akpom 59'; Brobbey 70'	Stadium: Kras Stadion; Attendance: 7,000; Referee: Alex Bos

12 May 2024 33	Ajax	3–0	Almere City	Amsterdam
14:30 CEST (UTC+2)	Mannsverk (yellow card) 26'; Bergwijn 29', 34', 38'; Kaplan (yellow card) 45+3'; Hato (yellow card) 62'	Report	Akujobi (yellow card) 10'; Van Bruggen (yellow card) 52'	Stadium: Johan Cruyff Arena (roof open); Attendance: 54,697; Referee: Danny Makkelie

19 May 2024 34	Vitesse	2–2	Ajax	Arnhem
14:30 CEST (UTC+2)	Oroz (yellow card) 9'; Boutrah 15'; Kozłowski 78'; Hadj Moussa (yellow card) 90+1'	Report	Šutalo 42', (yellow card) 61'; Bergwijn (yellow card) 90+1'; Berghuis 90+3'	Stadium: GelreDome; Attendance: 18,796; Referee: Erwin Blank

=== KNVB Cup ===
21 December 2023 Second round	USV Hercules	3–2	Ajax	Utrecht
18:45 CET (UTC+1)	Pieters 16', 66'; Fonville (yellow card) 42'; Van Hussen (yellow card) 44'; Grotenbreg 90+3'	Report	Ávila (yellow card) 44'; Brobbey (yellow card) 75', (goal) 83'; Gaaei (yellow card) 77'; Akpom 89'	Stadium: Stadion Galgenwaard; Attendance: 5,400; Referee: Erwin Blank

=== UEFA Europa League ===
==== Knockout phase ====
===== Play-off round =====
The play-off round draw was held on 7 August 2023.

24 August 2023 First leg	Ludogorets Razgrad (Bulgaria)	1–4	(Netherlands) Ajax	Razgrad, Bulgaria
20:00 CEST	Verdon 70' (pen.)	Report	Kudus 16', 18', 50'; Brobbey 40'; Medić (yellow card) 81'	Stadium: Huvepharma Arena; Attendance: 9,880; Referee: Marco Di Bello (Italy)

31 August 2023 Second leg	Ajax (Netherlands)	0–1 (4–2 agg.)	(Bulgaria) Ludogorets Razgrad	Amsterdam, Netherlands
20:00 CEST	Bergwijn (yellow card) 45'; Taylor (yellow card) 56'; Berghuis (yellow card) 74'	Report	Heister (yellow card) 55'; Tissera 62'; Gonçalves (yellow card) 71'	Stadium: Johan Cruyff Arena (roof open); Attendance: 50,900; Referee: Ivan Kružliak (Slovakia)

==== Group stage ====
The draw for the group stage was held on 1 September 2023.

Pos	Team	Pld	W	D	L	GF	GA	GD	Pts	Qualification	BHA	MAR	AJA	AEK
1	(England) Brighton & Hove Albion	6	4	1	1	10	5	+5	13	Advance to round of 16	—	1–0	2–0	2–3
2	(France) Marseille	6	3	2	1	14	10	+4	11	Advance to knockout round play-offs	2–2	—	4–3	3–1
3	(Netherlands) Ajax	6	1	2	3	10	13	−3	5	Transfer to Europa Conference League	0–2	3–3	—	3–1
4	(Greece) AEK Athens	6	1	1	4	6	12	−6	4		0–1	0–2	1–1	—

Source: UEFA
Rules for classification: Group stage tiebreakers

21 September 2023 1	Ajax (Netherlands)	3–3	(France) Marseille	Amsterdam, Netherlands
21:00 CEST (UTC+2)	Borges 9'; Berghuis 20', (yellow card) 22'; Taylor 52'; Vos (yellow card) 55' (yellow-red card) 90+1'	Report	Clauss 23'; Aubameyang 38', 78'; Gigot (yellow card) 90+7'	Stadium: Johan Cruyff Arena (roof closed); Attendance: 53,000; Referee: Maurizio Mariani (Italy)

5 October 2023 2	AEK Athens (Greece)	1–1	(Netherlands) Ajax	Athens, Greece
18:45 CEST (UTC+2)	Vida (yellow card) 40', (goal) 74'; Pineda (yellow card) 52'; Araujo (yellow card) 89'; Amrabat (yellow card) 90'	Report	Bergwijn 30' (pen.); Brobbey (yellow card) 56'; Šutalo (yellow card) 61'	Stadium: AEK Arena; Attendance: 29,524; Referee: Matej Jug (Slovenia)

26 October 2023 3	Brighton & Hove Albion (England)	2–0	(Netherlands) Ajax	Falmer, England
18:45 CEST (UTC+2)	Mitoma (yellow card) 22'; Van Hecke (yellow card) 31'; João Pedro 42'; Fati 53'	Report		Stadium: Falmer Stadium; Attendance: 30,540; Referee: Bartosz Frankowski (Poland)

9 November 2023 4	Ajax (Netherlands)	0–2	(England) Brighton & Hove Albion	Amsterdam, Netherlands
18:45 CET (UTC+1)		Report	Fati 14'; João Pedro (yellow card) 33'; Adingra 53'; Van Hecke (yellow card) 69'	Stadium: Johan Cruyff Arena (roof closed); Attendance: 52,095; Referee: Nikola Dabanović (Montenegro)

30 November 2023 5	Marseille (France)	4–3	(Netherlands) Ajax	Marseille, France
21:00 CET (UTC+1)	Aubameyang 9' (pen.), 48', 90+3' (pen.); Mbemba 26'; Lodi (yellow card) 69'; Sarr (yellow card) 90'	Report	Brobbey 10', 30'; Berghuis (red card) 63'; Taylor (yellow card) 71'; Hlynsson (yellow card) 76'; Akpom 79'; Rensch (yellow card) 90+3'; Hato (yellow card) 90+8'	Stadium: Stade Vélodrome; Attendance: 60,638; Referee: Simone Sozza (Italy)

14 December 2023 6	Ajax (Netherlands)	3–1	(Greece) AEK Athens	Amsterdam, Netherlands
21:00 CEST (UTC+2)	Akpom 5', 56'; Brobbey (yellow card) 8'; Sosa (yellow card) 10'; Taylor 20'; Hato (yellow card) 54'; Šutalo (yellow card) 76'	Report	García 11'; Amrabat (yellow card) 15'; Vida (yellow card) 35'; Moukoudi (yellow card) 45+2'	Stadium: Johan Cruyff Arena (roof open); Attendance: 53,926; Referee: Craig Pawson (England)

=== UEFA Europa Conference League ===
==== Knockout phase ====
===== Knockout round play-offs =====
The draw for the knockout round play-offs was held on 18 December 2023.

15 February 2024 First leg	Ajax (Netherlands)	2–2	(Norway) Bodø/Glimt	Amsterdam, Netherlands
21:00 CET (UTC+1)	Gooijer (yellow card) 85'; Henderson (yellow card) 87'; Van den Boomen 90+1' (pen.); Berghuis 90+7'	Report	Grønbæk 16', 64'; Moe (yellow card) 37'; Bjørtuft (red card) 90+1'	Stadium: Johan Cruyff Arena (roof open); Attendance: 52,267; Referee: António Nobre (Portugal)

22 February 2024 Second leg	Bodø/Glimt (Norway)	1–2 (a.e.t.) (3–4 agg.)	(Netherlands) Ajax	Bodø, Norway
18:45 CET (UTC+1)	Grønbæk (yellow card) 57' (yellow-red card) 65'; Žugelj (yellow card) 79'; Berg 83'; Gundersen (yellow card) 90+1'; Evjen (yellow card) 96'	Report	Berghuis 34'; Šutalo (red card) 48'; Rensch (yellow card) 57'; Ramaj (yellow card) 79'; Taylor 114'	Stadium: Aspmyra Stadion; Attendance: 7,885; Referee: Anastasios Sidiropoulos (Greece)

===== Round of 16 =====
The draw for the round of 16 was held on 23 February 2024.

7 March 2024 First leg	Ajax (Netherlands)	0–0	(England) Aston Villa	Amsterdam, Netherlands
18:45 CET (UTC+1)	Mannsverk (yellow card) 24'; Gooijer (yellow card) 68' (yellow-red card) 86'	Report	Konsa (yellow card) 25' (yellow-red card) 83'; Cash (yellow card) 64'; Zaniolo (yellow card) 76'	Stadium: Johan Cruyff Arena (roof open); Attendance: 52,197; Referee: Enea Jorgji (Albania)

14 March 2024 Second leg	Aston Villa (England)	4–0 (4–0 agg.)	(Netherlands) Ajax	Birmingham, England
21:00 CET (UTC+1)	Rogers (yellow card) 11'; Watkins (yellow card) 19', (goal) 25'; Bailey 60'; Durán 75'; Diaby 81'	Report	Mannsverk (yellow card) 14' (yellow-red card) 66'	Stadium: Villa Park; Attendance: 37,916; Referee: Orel Grinfeld (Israel)

== Statistics ==
=== Appearances and goals ===
No.	Pos	Nat	Player	Total		Eredivisie		KNVB Cup		Europa League		Europa Conference League	
No.	Pos	Nat	Player	Apps	Goals	Apps	Goals	Apps	Goals	Apps	Goals	Apps	Goals
1	GK	(Argentina) ARG	Gerónimo Rulli	7	0	7	0	0	0	0	0	0	0
2	DF	(Netherlands) NED	Devyne Rensch	38	2	26+2	2	0	0	6	0	4	0
3	DF	(Denmark) DEN	Anton Gaaei	34	1	12+13	1	0+1	0	4+1	0	0+3	0
4	DF	(Netherlands) NED	Jorrel Hato	46	1	33	1	1	0	8	0	4	0
6	MF	(England) ENG	Jordan Henderson	12	0	9	0	0	0	0	0	3	0
7	FW	(Netherlands) NED	Steven Bergwijn	31	13	23+1	12	0	0	7	1	0	0
8	MF	(Netherlands) NED	Kenneth Taylor	47	8	31+3	5	1	0	8	2	3+1	1
9	FW	(Netherlands) NED	Brian Brobbey	43	22	29+1	18	0+1	1	8	3	4	0
10	FW	(England) ENG	Chuba Akpom	35	15	8+16	11	1	1	1+5	3	1+3	0
11	FW	(Portugal) POR	Carlos Forbs	32	3	8+13	2	1	0	6+2	1	1+1	0
12	GK	(Netherlands) NED	Jay Gorter	12	0	7+1	0	0	0	4	0	0	0
13	DF	(Turkey) TUR	Ahmetcan Kaplan	13	0	10+1	0	0	0	0	0	2	0
16	MF	(Norway) NOR	Sivert Mannsverk	16	0	12+1	0	0	0	0	0	2+1	0
18	DF	(Croatia) CRO	Jakov Medić	9	1	3+3	1	0	0	2+1	0	0	0
19	FW	(Netherlands) NED	Julian Rijkhoff	10	0	0+8	0	0	0	0	0	0+2	0
21	MF	(Netherlands) NED	Branco van den Boomen	29	3	11+10	2	0	0	1+4	0	1+2	1
22	GK	(Netherlands) NED	Remko Pasveer	0	0	0	0	0	0	0	0	0	0
23	FW	(Netherlands) NED	Steven Berghuis	29	8	16+4	5	0	0	6+1	1	2	2
24	DF	(Netherlands) NED	Silvano Vos	14	0	3+8	0	0	0	1+2	0	0	0
25	DF	(Croatia) CRO	Borna Sosa	24	0	10+6	0	0	0	3+1	0	3+1	0
27	FW	(Netherlands) NED	Amourricho van Axel Dongen	5	0	1+2	0	1	0	0+1	0	0	0
28	MF	(Netherlands) NED	Kian Fitz-Jim	2	0	0+2	0	0	0	0	0	0	0
30	DF	(Argentina) ARG	Gastón Ávila	8	0	4+1	0	1	0	1+1	0	0	0
33	MF	(Bosnia and Herzegovina) BIH	Benjamin Tahirović	37	2	18+8	2	0+1	0	7+1	0	1+1	0
37	DF	(Croatia) CRO	Josip Šutalo	32	1	22+1	1	1	0	5	0	3	0
38	FW	(Iceland) ISL	Kristian Hlynsson	34	7	22+3	7	1	0	2+2	0	4	0
39	FW	(Belgium) BEL	Mika Godts	16	0	7+6	0	0	0	0+3	0	0	0
40	GK	(Germany) GER	Diant Ramaj	30	0	20+2	0	1	0	3	0	4	0
42	FW	(Curaçao) CUW	Ar'jany Martha	12	0	8+1	0	0+1	0	0+2	0	0	0
47	DF	(Netherlands) NED	Tristan Gooijer	13	0	7+2	0	1	0	0+1	0	2	0
49	FW	(Netherlands) NED	Jaydon Banel	6	0	1+4	0	0	0	0+1	0	0	0
Players sold or loaned out after the start of the season:
5	DF	(Netherlands) NED	Owen Wijndal	4	0	0+2	0	0	0	2	0	0	0
6	MF	(Netherlands) NED	Davy Klaassen	4	1	0+2	1	0	0	0+2	0	0	0
17	DF	(Netherlands) NED	Anass Salah-Eddine	9	0	2+4	0	0	0	0+3	0	0	0
19	DF	(Mexico) MEX	Jorge Sánchez	0	0	0	0	0	0	0	0	0	0
19	FW	(Georgia (country)) GEO	Georges Mikautadze	9	0	2+4	0	1	0	0+2	0	0	0
20	MF	(Ghana) GHA	Mohammed Kudus	3	4	2	1	0	0	1	3	0	0
35	FW	(Portugal) POR	Francisco Conceição	0	0	0	0	0	0	0	0	0	0

Source: Competitive matches

=== Goalscorers ===
Rank	No	Pos	Nat	Name	Eredivisie	KNVB Cup	Europa League	Europa Conference League	Total
1	9	FW	(Netherlands)	Brian Brobbey	18	1	3	0	22
2	10	FW	(England)	Chuba Akpom	11	1	3	0	15
3	7	FW	(Netherlands)	Steven Bergwijn	12	0	1	0	13
4	8	FW	(Netherlands)	Kenneth Taylor	5	0	2	1	8
4	23	FW	(Netherlands)	Steven Berghuis	5	0	1	2	8
6	38	MF	(Iceland)	Kristian Hlynsson	7	0	0	0	7
7	20	MF	(Ghana)	Mohammed Kudus	1	0	3	0	4
8	11	FW	(Portugal)	Carlos Forbs	2	0	1	0	3
8	21	MF	(Netherlands)	Branco van den Boomen	2	0	0	1	3
10	2	DF	(Netherlands)	Devyne Rensch	2	0	0	0	2
10	33	MF	(Bosnia and Herzegovina)	Benjamin Tahirović	2	0	0	0	2
12	3	DF	(Denmark)	Anton Gaaei	1	0	0	0	1
12	4	DF	(Netherlands)	Jorrel Hato	1	0	0	0	1
12	6	MF	(Netherlands)	Davy Klaassen	1	0	0	0	1
12	18	DF	(Croatia)	Jakov Medić	1	0	0	0	1
12	37	DF	(Croatia)	Josip Šutalo	1	0	0	0	1
Own goal					2	0	0	0	1
Totals					74	2	14	4	94

Source: Competitive matches

=== Clean sheets ===
Rank	No	Pos	Nat	Name	Eredivisie	KNVB Cup	Europa League	Europa Conference League	Total
1	40	GK	(Germany)	Diant Ramaj	3	0	0	1	4
2	12	GK	(Netherlands)	Jay Gorter	1	0	0	0	1
2	1	GK	(Argentina)	Gerónimo Rulli	1	0	0	0	1
Total					5	0	0	1	6

Source: Competitive matches

=== Disciplinary record ===
N	P	Nat.	Name	Eredivisie			KNVB Cup			Europa League			Europa Conference League			Total			Notes
N	P	Nat.	Name	Yellow card	Second yellow card	Red card	Yellow card	Second yellow card	Red card	Yellow card	Second yellow card	Red card	Yellow card	Second yellow card	Red card	Yellow card	Second yellow card	Red card	Notes
2	DF	(Netherlands)	Devyne Rensch	2		1				1			1			4		1	
3	DF	(Denmark)	Anton Gaaei	1			1									2			
4	DF	(Netherlands)	Jorrel Hato	5						2						7			
6	MF	(England)	Jordan Henderson										1			1			
7	FW	(Netherlands)	Steven Bergwijn	5		1				1						6		1	
8	MF	(Netherlands)	Kenneth Taylor	3						2						5			
9	FW	(Netherlands)	Brian Brobbey	4			1			2						7			
10	FW	(England)	Chuba Akpom							1						1			
13	DF	(Turkey)	Ahmetcan Kaplan	3		1										3		1	
16	MF	(Norway)	Sivert Mannsverk	4									1	1		5	1		
18	DF	(Croatia)	Jakov Medić	1						1						2			
21	MF	(Netherlands)	Branco van den Boomen	1												1			
23	FW	(Netherlands)	Steven Berghuis	1						2		1				3		1	
24	DF	(Netherlands)	Silvano Vos	3						1	1					4	1		
25	DF	(Croatia)	Borna Sosa	1						1						2			
30	DF	(Argentina)	Gastón Ávila	1			1									2			
33	MF	(Bosnia and Herzegovina)	Benjamin Tahirović	5												5			
37	DF	(Croatia)	Josip Šutalo	2						2					1	4		1	
38	DF	(Iceland)	Kristian Hlynsson	2						1						3			
40	DF	(Germany)	Diant Ramaj										1			1			
47	DF	(Netherlands)	Tristan Gooijer										1	1		1	1		

Source: Competitive matches
Ordered by (red card) , (second yellow card) and (yellow card)
(yellow card) = Number of bookings; (second yellow card) = Number of sending offs after a second yellow card; (red card) = Number of sending offs by a direct red card.
