= Tristan Gooijer =

Dutch footballer (born 2004)

Personal information
- Date of birth: 2 September 2004 (age 22)
- Place of birth: Blaricum, Netherlands
- Height: 1.85 m (6 ft 1 in)
- Position: Defender

Team information
- Current team: Lommel
- Number: 47

Youth career
- 2008–2013: Forza Almere
- 2013–2014: FC Almere
- 2014–2016: Almere City
- 2016–2020: Ajax

Senior career*
Years	Team	Apps	(Gls)
2021–2026	Jong Ajax	50	(3)
2023–2026	Ajax	9	(0)
2024–2026	→ PEC Zwolle (loan)	24	(3)
2026–	Lommel	3	(0)

International career^{‡}
2019	Netherlands U16	3	(0)
2021	Netherlands U18	6	(0)
2026–	Netherlands U21	1	(0)
- * Club domestic league appearances and goals as of 19 September 2026 ‡ National team caps and goals as of 30 March 2026

Tristan Gooijer (born 2 September 2004) is a Dutch professional footballer who plays as a defender for Belgian Pro League club Lommel.

== Club career ==
Gooijer is a product of the youth academies of FC Almere, Forza Almere and Almere City, before moving to the youth academy of Ajax in 2016. He signed his first professional contract with Ajax on 23 June 2021. He made his professional debut with Jong Ajax in a 6–3 Eerste Divisie win ADO Den Haag on 7 March 2022.

On 16 July 2024, Gooijer joined Eredivisie side PEC Zwolle on a season-long loan deal. He suffered a knee injury in his first game for PEC Zwolle and missed the remainder of the 2024–25 season recovering. On 29 August 2025, Gooijer returned to PEC Zwolle on a new loan.

On 27 August 2026, Gooijer signed for Belgian Pro League club Lommel on a two-year contract.

== International career ==
Gooijer played youth international for the Netherlands at under-16 and under-18 levels.

== Personal life ==
Born in the Netherlands, Gooijer is of Indonesian descent.

== Career statistics ==
=== Club ===
As of match played 24 May 2026

Club	Season	League			Cup		Europe		Other		Total	
Club	Season	Division	Apps	Goals	Apps	Goals	Apps	Goals	Apps	Goals	Apps	Goals
Jong Ajax	2021–22	Eerste Divisie	5	0	–		–		0	0	5	0
Jong Ajax	2022–23	Eerste Divisie	24	0	–		–		0	0	24	0
Jong Ajax	2023–24	Eerste Divisie	21	3	–		–		0	0	21	3
Jong Ajax	Total		50	3	–		–		0	0	50	3
Ajax	2023–24	Eredivisie	9	0	1	0	3 (Note: One appearance in UEFA Europa League, two appearances in UEFA Europa Conference League)	0	–		13	0
PEC Zwolle (loan)	2024–25	Eredivisie	1	0	0	0	—		–		1	0
PEC Zwolle (loan)	2025–26	Eredivisie	23	3	1	0	—		–		24	3
PEC Zwolle (loan)	Total		24	3	1	0	0	0	0	0	25	3
Lommel	2026–27	Belgian Pro League	0	0	0	0	—		—		0	0
Career total			83	3	2	0	3	0	0	0	88	6
