= Jelle ten Rouwelaar =

Dutch footballer

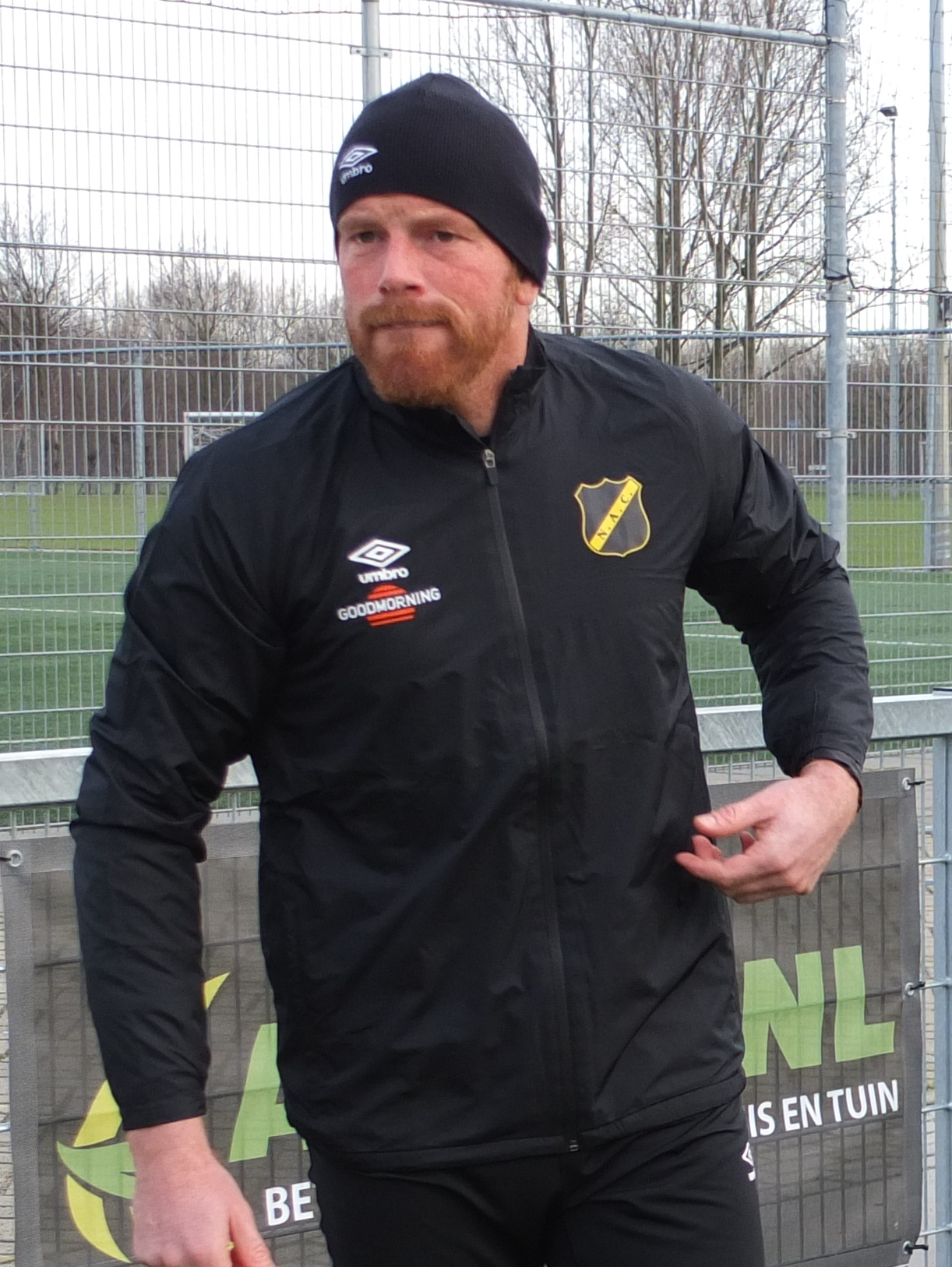
- Ten Rouwelaar training with NAC in 2015

Personal information
- Full name: Jelle ten Rouwelaar
- Date of birth: 24 December 1980 (age 45)
- Place of birth: Joure, Netherlands
- Height: 1.86 m (6 ft 1 in)
- Position: Goalkeeper

Team information
- Current team: Brighton & Hove Albion (goalkeeping coach)

Youth career
- SC Joure
- Emmen

Senior career*
Years	Team	Apps	(Gls)
1998–2002	FC Emmen	77	(0)
2002–2006	PSV	2	(0)
2002–2003	→ Groningen (loan)	4	(0)
2003–2004	→ Twente (loan)	11	(0)
2004–2005	→ Zwolle (loan)	36	(0)
2005–2006	→ FC Eindhoven (loan)	36	(0)
2006–2007	Austria Wien	4	(0)
2007–2016	NAC Breda	313	(0)
Total		483	(0)

Managerial career
- 2024–2025: Leicester City (assistant)
- * Club domestic league appearances and goals

Jelle ten Rouwelaar (Dutch pronunciation: [ˈjɛlə tɛn ˈrʌuəˌlaːr]; born 24 December 1980) is a Dutch professional football coach and former player who is currently the goalkeeping coach of Premier League club Brighton & Hove Albion.

Ten Rouwelaar started his career in the 1998–99 season playing for Emmen. He was the first-choice goalkeeper of NAC Breda for nine years in which he hardly missed a match. In March 2011, he received a call-up for the Netherlands national team, but he did not play.

After retirement, Ten Rouwelaar became the goalkeeping coach of NAC Breda in 2016. In 2018, he was the goalkeeping coach at Netherlands U-20 along his club duties. In 2020, he left the Dutch club and served as goalkeeping coach in Anderlecht under manager Vincent Kompany. He followed Kompany to join Burnley in 2022. In 2024, he joined Ajax briefly but left within eight days to join Manchester United under manager Erik ten Hag.

Following Ten Hag's departure and Amorim's appointment, Ten Rouwellar left Manchester United and moved to fellow Premier League club Leicester City in 2024 as a first-team coach under the new Dutch manager Ruud van Nistelrooy.

== Career ==
=== Coaching career ===
On 29 April 2016, during the match against Go Ahead Eagles the fans started to applaud his recently deceased mother at the 61st minute in reference to his mother's age. On 19 May 2016, he played his last match during the playoffs of the Dutch professional competitions.

After his active career, he was immediately hired as goalkeeper coach for NAC Breda, where he stayed until the summer of 2020. From there, he was hired in an identical position at Anderlecht. During the 2018–19 season, Ten Rouwelaar was also functioning as a goalkeeper coach for the Dutch U-20 national team.

In July 2022, Jelle ten Rouwelaar moved to English Premier League club Burnley under newly hired manager, Vincent Kompany, who he also worked under at Anderlecht.

In July 2024, he joined Ajax as goalkeeping coach, but left within eight days, as his compensation fee was paid by Manchester United, who signed him to replace Richard Hartis, who left the club after five years, as a part of the overhaul under the new ownership structure. On 11 November 2024, following Ruben Amorim's appointment as head coach, ten Rouwelaar left Manchester United's coaching staff.

In November 2024, ten Rouwelaar joined Premier League club Leicester City as part as new manager Ruud van Nistelrooy's coaching staff. He left on 4 July 2025 to become the goalkeeping coach of Brighton & Hove Albion.
