= Francesco Farioli =

Italian football manager (born 1989)

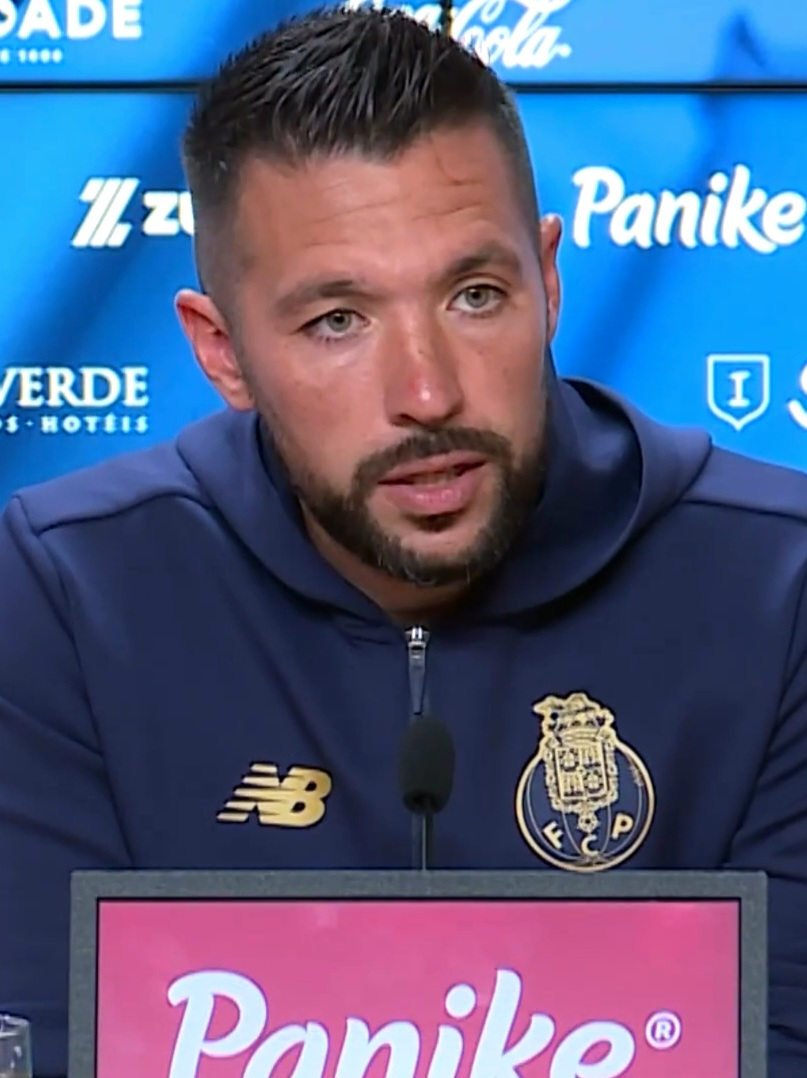
- Farioli with Porto in 2025

Personal information
- Full name: Francesco Farioli
- Date of birth: 10 April 1989 (age 37)
- Place of birth: Barga, Italy

Team information
- Current team: Porto (head coach)

Managerial career
- Years: Team
- 2021: Fatih Karagümrük
- 2021–2023: Alanyaspor
- 2023–2024: Nice
- 2024–2025: Ajax
- 2025–: Porto

Francesco Farioli (Italian pronunciation: [faˈrjɔːli]; born 10 April 1989) is an Italian football manager who is currently the head coach of Primeira Liga club Porto.

Farioli started his coaching career in Turkey with spells at Fatih Karagümrük and Alanyaspor. He then had one season in charge of French club Nice in Ligue 1, before being appointed by Ajax in May 2024. He resigned after one season at the club and following that, in July 2025, he was announced as the head coach of Porto.

== Career ==
=== Early career ===
Farioli studied philosophy and later sports science at the University of Florence. He began his coaching career with Margine Coperta, a lower-division Italian football club, where he was goalkeeping coach from 2009 to 2011. He subsequently worked as a goalkeeping coach for Fortis Juventus and Lucchese in the Italian Serie C.

Farioli then joined the Aspire Academy in Qatar as a goalkeeping coach for the Qatar U16 national team. While at Aspire, he met Roberto De Zerbi and Jarkko Tuomisto.

He returned to Italy to work as the goalkeeping coach for Benevento under De Zerbi during the 2017–18 season. He then followed De Zerbi to Sassuolo, where he continued as goalkeeping coach from 2018 to 2020.

=== Turkey ===
==== Alanyaspor (assistant manager) ====
Farioli's first role as an assistant manager was with the Turkish Süper Lig club Alanyaspor for the 2020–21 season under manager Çağdaş Atan.

==== Fatih Karagümrük ====
On 21 March 2021, he was appointed the head coach of Fatih Karagümrük, another Süper Lig club. At 31, he was one of the youngest managers in a professional European league. Farioli implemented a possession-based style of play at Fatih Karagümrük, a significant departure from the more direct approach common in the Süper Lig. His team led the league in average possession (61.3%) and had the second-highest number of open-play passing sequences of 10 or more passes. This tactical approach garnered attention for its distinctiveness. He managed Fatih Karagümrük until 12 December 2021.

==== Return to Alanyaspor ====
On 31 December 2021, he returned to Alanyaspor, this time as head coach. Farioli guided Alanyaspor through the second half of the 2021–22 Süper Lig season, achieving 11 wins, 3 draws, and 5 losses in the 19 league games he managed. The team finished the season in 5th place and reached the semi-finals of the 2021–22 Turkish Cup. In the 2022–23 Süper Lig season, Farioli oversaw the first 22 league matches, recording 6 wins, 7 draws, and 9 losses, before leaving the club by his own decision on 27 February 2023.

=== Nice ===
On 30 June 2023, Farioli joined French Ligue 1 side Nice as manager, signing a two-year contract. During his time at Nice, Farioli implemented a distinctive tactical system with influences from his previous mentor, Roberto De Zerbi, emphasizing possession-based football and a high defensive line. This approach led to a strong start to the 2023–24 Ligue 1 season, with Nice briefly challenging Paris Saint-Germain for the top spot in the league standings. Despite some decline in form later in the season, Nice finished the season in 5th place, securing qualification for the UEFA Europa League. In September 2023, Farioli obtained his UEFA Pro Licence.

=== Ajax ===
On 23 May 2024, Farioli was appointed head coach of Dutch club Ajax, signing a three-year contract and becoming the club's first Italian manager. His appointment also marked the first time Ajax had hired a foreign manager since Morten Olsen in the 1997–98 season.

Taking charge following a disappointing 2023–24 campaign, Farioli sought to stabilise the squad by implementing a disciplined defensive structure similar to that of his previous tenure at Nice. His emphasis on organisation, tactical flexibility, and youth development contributed to Ajax holding the best defensive record in the league and reaching first place in the 2024–25 Eredivisie by March 2025.

A pivotal moment in the season came with a 2–0 away victory over title rivals PSV, which drew praise for Farioli's tailored tactical approach. Analysts highlighted Ajax's pressing schemes and rehearsed player movements aimed at exploiting PSV's defensive shape, as well as his in-game shift to a 5–4–1 formation to protect the lead.

Despite holding a nine-point lead with five matches remaining, Ajax suffered a dramatic collapse and were overtaken by PSV, who secured the title on the final day. Farioli, visibly emotional after the final match, stated he had "no regrets" despite the outcome. Reports of internal disagreements over tactics, transfer policy, and budget constraints followed, culminating in Farioli's departure by mutual consent on 19 May 2025.

In May 2026, a year after his departure, Farioli elaborated on his exit during an interview with ESPN, stating that internal political struggles and decision-making by club officials lacking football expertise had created an impossible working environment and delayed necessary operations within the club.

=== Porto ===
On 6 July 2025, Francesco Farioli was officially unveiled as the head coach of Porto, signing on a two-year contract following the departure of Martín Anselmi by mutual consent. His appointment arrived at a pivotal moment: Porto had finished the 2024–25 Primeira Liga season in third place, nine points behind champions Sporting CP, and suffered a disappointing group-stage exit at the FIFA Club World Cup. He started the 2025–26 season with 7 wins in 7 league matches, and was named the Primeira Liga Manager of the Month for August 2025.

On 11 January 2026, after a record-breaking first half of the season, in which Porto topped the Primeira Liga table with 16 victories and 1 draw in 17 matches, having kept 13 clean sheets and suffered just 4 goals, Farioli extended his contract with the Dragons until 30 June 2028. His club secured the Primeira Liga title following a 1–0 win over Alverca on 2 May 2026.

== Tactics ==
Francesco Farioli's coaching style was influenced by his time spent as an assistant to Roberto De Zerbi, but he has since honed his own interpretation of De Zerbi's principles. Farioli emphasises retaining possession, with methodical, structured build up play ensuring his team create chances from sustained passing sequences whilst retaining a compact rest defence to protect against counter-attacks in case the ball is lost. His teams often concentrate players centrally, using short passes to dictate the game's pace, with an emphasis placed on regaining possession quickly after losing the ball. Key ideas include using quick passing sequences to bypass opponents and adjusting the speed of attacks based on the opposition.

Attacking play focuses on progressing the ball to players in pockets of space between the opposition's defensive and midfield lines, isolating opposition full backs in 1v1 situations on the wings, and several players arriving to overload the opponent's penalty box. Defensively, Farioli emphasizes aggressive high pressing – seeking to force turnovers as close as possible to the opposition goal, with his teams frequently top of their respective leagues in passes per defensive actions and high turnovers. When defending deeper, his teams tend to fall into a mid block, protecting central areas and forcing attacks towards the sidelines, while remaining ready to press high again when feasible. If the mid-block is bypassed his teams typically resort to a 5–3–2/5–4–1 low-block, prioritising compact structure and neutralising space in behind. Farioli's priority when arriving at clubs has been creating solid defensive foundations. In three consecutive seasons, Farioli's Nice, Ajax and Porto teams all conceded the fewest goals and accrued the most clean sheets in their league seasons.

== Managerial statistics ==
As of 20 November 2026

Managerial record by team and tenure
Team	Nat.	From	To	Record							
Team	Nat.	From	To	G	W	D	L	GF	GA	GD	Win %
Fatih Karagümrük	(Turkey)	22 March 2021	16 December 2021	27	11	8	8	43	39	+4	40.74
Alanyaspor	(Turkey)	31 December 2021	27 February 2023	48	20	12	16	82	76	+6	41.67
Nice	(France)	30 June 2023	23 May 2024	38	17	11	10	48	35	+13	44.74
Ajax	(Netherlands)	23 May 2024	19 May 2025	54	35	7	12	102	53	+49	64.81
Porto	(Portugal)	6 July 2025	Present	71	53	9	9	133	46	+87	74.65
Total				238	136	47	55	406	248	+158	57.14

== Honours ==
Porto

- Primeira Liga: 2025–26
- Supertaça Cândido de Oliveira: 2026

Individual

- Primeira Liga Manager of the Month: August 2025, December 2025, April 2026
- Primeira Liga Manager of the Season: 2025–26
