= 2022–23 Jong Ajax season =

Jong Ajax
2022–23 season
- Chairman: Hennie Henrichs
- Manager: John Heitinga (until 27 January); Michel Kreek (interim until 15 February); Dave Vos (since 15 February)
- Stadium: Sportpark De Toekomst
- Eerste Divisie: 13th
- Top goalscorer: League: Kristian Hlynsson (10); All: Kristian Hlynsson (10)
- All statistics correct as of 19 May 2023.

During the 2022–23 season, Jong Ajax participated in the Dutch Eerste Divisie, the 2nd tier of professional football in the Netherlands. It was their 9th consecutive season in the Eerste Divisie.

== Squad ==
As of 1 February 2023

Note: Flags indicate national team as defined under FIFA eligibility rules; some limited exceptions apply. Players may hold more than one non-FIFA nationality.

No.	Pos.	Nation	Player
36	FW	NED	Amourricho van Axel Dongen
37	FW	DEN	Christian Rasmussen
38	MF	ISL	Kristian Hlynsson
39	FW	BEL	Mika Godts
40	FW	NED	Sontje Hansen
41	MF	NED	Silvano Vos
42	FW	NED	Ar'jany Martha
43	DF	NED	Olivier Aertssen
44	DF	SRB	Mateja Milovanović
45	MF	NED	Donny Warmerdam

No.	Pos.	Nation	Player
46	MF	ECU	Patrickson Delgado (on loan from Independiente del Valle)
47	DF	NED	Tristan Gooijer
48	DF	MAR	Diyae Jermoumi
49	FW	NED	Jaydon Banel
51	GK	ENG	Charlie Setford
52	GK	NED	Sten Kremers
53	GK	NED	Tom de Graaff
54	MF	NED	Julian Brandes
55	MF	NED	Gabriel Misehouy
57	DF	NED	Jorrel Hato

== Transfers ==
For a list of all Dutch football transfers in the summer window (9 June 2022 to 31 August 2022) please see List of Dutch football transfers summer 2022. For a list of all Dutch football transfers in the winter window (3 January 2023 to 31 January 2023) please see List of Dutch football transfers winter 2022–23.

=== Summer ===
In:

No.	Pos.	Nation	Player
—	GK	NED	Tom de Graaff (from Ajax U18)
—	GK	NED	Sten Kremers (from Ajax U18)
—	DF	NED	Olivier Aertssen (from Ajax U18)
—	DF	NED	Tristan Gooijer (from Ajax U18)
—	DF	MAR	Diyae Jermoumi (from Ajax U18)
—	DF	SRB	Mateja Milovanović (from Ajax U18)
—	MF	NED	Julian Brandes (from Ajax U18)
—	MF	NED	Gabriel Misehouy (from Ajax U18)
—	MF	NED	Silvano Vos (from Ajax U18)
—	FW	NED	Jaydon Banel (from Ajax U18)
—	FW	DEN	Jeppe Kjær (from Ajax U18)
—	FW	BRA	Giovanni (loan return from SC Telstar)

Out:

No.	Pos.	Nation	Player
26	MF	NED	Youri Regeer (to Ajax)
32	FW	NED	Naci Ünüvar (to Ajax)
41	MF	NED	Enric Llansana (to Go Ahead Eagles)
43	DF	NED	Nordin Musampa (to FC Groningen)
46	DF	NED	Anass Salah-Eddine (on loan at FC Twente)
47	DF	NED	Steven van der Sloot (to (Germany) FC Schalke 04 II)
48	DF	NED	Terrence Douglas (to Roda JC Kerkrade, previously on loan at FC Den Bosch)
49	FW	NED	Max de Waal (on loan at ADO Den Haag, previously on loan at PEC Zwolle)
52	GK	NED	Calvin Raatsie (to FC Utrecht)
53	DF	NED	Liam van Gelderen (to FC Groningen)
54	DF	NED	Rio Hillen (to De Graafschap)
55	MF	NED	Gibson Yah (to Jong FC Utrecht)
—	FW	BFA	Hassane Bandé (to (France) Amiens SC, previously on loan at (Croatia) Istra)
—	GK	NED	Joey Roggeveen (released)

=== Winter ===
In:

No.	Pos.	Nation	Player
39	FW	BEL	Mika Godts (from (Belgium) Genk)
57	DF	NED	Jorrel Hato (from Ajax U18)

Out:

No.	Pos.	Nation	Player
25	DF	NED	Youri Baas (to Ajax)
28	MF	NED	Kian Fitz-Jim (to Ajax)
50	FW	BRA	Giovanni (to (Brazil) Fluminense FC)
56	FW	DEN	Jeppe Kjær (to (Norway) FK Bodø/Glimt)
58	MF	DEN	Victor Jensen (to FC Utrecht, previously on loan at (Norway) Rosenborg BK)

== Pre-season and friendlies ==
Win Draw Loss Fixtures

11 July 2022	Koninklijke HFC (Netherlands)	0–1	(Netherlands) Jong Ajax	Haarlem, Netherlands
19:30 CEST		Report	Giovanni 31'	Stadium: Spanjaardslaan

20 July 2022	Jong Ajax (Netherlands)	0−1	(Mexico) Tigres UANL U21	Duivendrecht, Netherlands
17:00 CEST		Report		Stadium: Sportpark De Toekomst

2 August 2022	Anderlecht Futures (Belgium)	4−1	(Netherlands) Jong Ajax	Duivendrecht, Netherlands
17:00 CEST		Report		Stadium: Sportpark De Toekomst

== Competitions ==
=== Eerste Divisie ===
==== League table ====
Pos	Team	Pld	W	D	L	GF	GA	GD	Pts	Promotion or qualification
11	Jong AZ	38	14	9	15	60	58	+2	51	Reserve teams are not eligible to be promoted to the Eredivisie
12	ADO Den Haag	38	13	12	13	51	57	−6	51	
13	Jong Ajax	38	12	10	16	69	72	−3	46	Reserve teams are not eligible to be promoted to the Eredivisie
14	Jong PSV	38	12	9	17	59	63	−4	45	Reserve teams are not eligible to be promoted to the Eredivisie
15	Roda JC Kerkrade	38	12	7	19	49	59	−10	43	

Source: Soccerway, Keuken Kampioen Divisie (in Dutch)
Rules for classification: Season in progress: 1) Most points won; 2) Less points lost; 3) Goal difference; 4) Goals scored; 5) Alphabetical order; End of season: 1) Points; 2) Goal difference; 3) Goals scored; 4) Head-to-head points; 5) Head-to-head goal difference; 6) Head-to-head away goals scored; 7) Play-off if relevant for deciding champion, relegation or participating in a European league, otherwise by draw. 8) Penalty shoot-out (only after a play-off)

==== Period 1 ====
Pos	Team	Pld	W	D	L	GF	GA	GD	Pts	Qualification
9	Willem II	10	4	3	3	14	12	+2	15	
10	NAC Breda	10	4	2	4	13	16	−3	14	
11	Jong Ajax	10	3	3	4	16	15	+1	12	Reserves teams cannot participate in the promotion play-offs
12	Jong PSV	10	3	3	4	12	17	−5	12	Reserves teams cannot participate in the promotion play-offs
13	Telstar	10	3	3	4	10	16	−6	12	

Source: Keuken Kampioen Divisie (in Dutch)
Rules for classification: 1) points; 2) goal difference; 3) number of goals scored

==== Period 2 ====
Pos	Team	Pld	W	D	L	GF	GA	GD	Pts	Qualification
10	Telstar	9	3	4	2	12	12	0	13	
11	Jong PSV	9	3	3	3	19	14	+5	12	Reserves teams cannot participate in the promotion play-offs
12	Jong Ajax	9	2	5	2	18	18	0	11	Reserves teams cannot participate in the promotion play-offs
13	Den Bosch	9	3	1	5	14	18	−4	10	
14	NAC Breda	9	3	1	5	12	16	−4	10	

Source: Keuken Kampioen Divisie (in Dutch)
Rules for classification: 1) points; 2) goal difference; 3) number of goals scored

==== Period 3 ====
Pos	Team	Pld	W	D	L	GF	GA	GD	Pts	Qualification
16	Den Bosch	9	2	2	5	10	32	−22	8	
17	Dordrecht	9	2	1	6	8	12	−4	7	
18	MVV Maastricht	9	2	1	6	16	21	−5	7	
19	Jong FC Utrecht	9	1	2	6	8	17	−9	5	Reserves teams cannot participate in the promotion play-offs
20	Jong Ajax	9	1	2	6	11	21	−10	5	Reserves teams cannot participate in the promotion play-offs

Source: Keuken Kampioen Divisie (in Dutch)
Rules for classification: 1) points; 2) goal difference; 3) number of goals scored

==== Period 4 ====
Pos	Team	Pld	W	D	L	GF	GA	GD	Pts	Qualification
2	Willem II	10	7	3	0	22	7	+15	24	Qualification for promotion play-offs
3	PEC Zwolle	10	7	1	2	21	11	+10	22	Period 2 winner
4	Jong Ajax	10	6	0	4	24	18	+6	18	Reserves teams cannot participate in the promotion play-offs
5	Almere City	10	5	3	2	18	12	+6	18	Period 3 winner
6	MVV Maastricht	10	6	0	4	13	13	0	18	

Source: Keuken Kampioen Divisie (in Dutch)
Rules for classification: 1) points; 2) goal difference; 3) number of goals scored

==== Results summary ====
Overall								Home						Away					
Pld	W	D	L	GF	GA	GD	Pts	W	D	L	GF	GA	GD	W	D	L	GF	GA	GD
38	12	10	16	69	72	−3	46	7	5	7	41	31	+10	5	5	9	28	41	−13

Last updated: 19 May 2023.
Source: Keuken Kampionen Divisie

==== Results by round ====
Round	1	2	3	4	5	6	7	8	9	10	11	12	13	14	15	16	17	18	19	20	21	22	23	24	25	26	27	28	29	30	31	32	33	34	35	36	37	38
Ground	H	A	H	A	H	A	A	H	A	H	A	H	H	A	H	A	H	A	H	A	H	A	H	A	H	A	H	A	H	A	H	A	H	A	A	H	H	A
Result	D	L	W	L	W	D	L	W	D	L	W	D	L	W	D	D	L	D	D	L	L	D	D	L	W	L	L	L	L	W	W	W	W	L	W	W	L	L
Position	9	14	9	11	10	9	11	10	11	11	10	11	13	10	10	10	12	12	13	14	15	15	16	17	15	16	17	17	18	16	16	15	15	15	13	13	13	13

Updated to match(es) played on 19 May 2023. Source: Keuken Kampionen Divisie
A = Away; H = Home; W = Win; D = Draw; L = Loss

==== Matches ====
8 August 2022 1	Jong Ajax	1−1	SC Telstar	Duivendrecht
20:00 CEST	Warmerdam (yellow card) 25'; Conceição 41'; Pierie (yellow card) 78'	Report	Blommestijn 3', (yellow card) 80'; Overtoom (yellow card) 57'; Najah (yellow card) 77'	Stadium: Sportpark De Toekomst; Attendance: 1,613; Referee: Martin Pérez

12 August 2022 2	Roda JC Kerkrade	1−0	Jong Ajax	Kerkrade
20:00 CEST	Vente 67' (pen.); Lambrix (yellow card) 81'; Mpie (yellow card) 90+2'; De Boer (yellow card) 90+6'	Report	Vos (yellow card) 63'; Jermoumi (yellow card) 85'; Fitz-Jim (yellow card) 90+3'	Stadium: Parkstad Limburg Stadion; Attendance: 8,352; Referee: Clay Ruperti

22 August 2022 3	Jong Ajax	5−1	De Graafschap	Duivendrecht
20:00 CEST	Warmerdam (yellow card) 3'; Hansen 9', 44'; Misehouy 70'; Rasmussen 73'; Lucca 80'	Report	Schenk (yellow card) 23'; Neghli 42'	Stadium: Sportpark De Toekomst; Attendance: 1,761; Referee: Martijn Vos

28 August 2022 4	ADO Den Haag	4−0	Jong Ajax	The Hague
12:15 CEST	Zwarts 2'; Asante (yellow card) 19'; Sverina 38', 61'; De Waal 48'; Breinburg (yellow card) 60'	Report		Stadium: Bingoal Stadion; Attendance: 3,785; Referee: Robin Hensgens

5 September 2022 5	Jong Ajax	4−0	Heracles Almelo	Duivendrecht
20:00 CEST	Lucca (yellow card) 39', (goal) 45', 57'; Warmerdam 73', 81'	Report		Stadium: Sportpark De Toekomst; Attendance: 1,557; Referee: Laurens Gerrets

9 September 2022 6	TOP Oss	1−1	Jong Ajax	Oss
20:00 CEST	Gündüz (yellow card) 54'; Margaritha 61'; Van Eijma (yellow card) 71'; Mathieu (yellow card) 90+3'	Report	Rasmussen 10'; Regeer (yellow card) 34'; Martha (yellow card) 39'; Warmerdam (yellow card) 82'; Jermoumi (yellow card) 90+1'	Stadium: Frans Heesen Stadion; Attendance: 1,668; Referee: Robin Vereijken

12 September 2022 8	Jong Ajax	3−1	NAC Breda	Duivendrecht
20:00 CEST	Pierie 48', (yellow card) 83'; Misehouy 59'; Milovanović (yellow card) 69'; Hansen (red card) 74'; Giovanni 81'	Report	Van der Sande 23'; Banzuzi (yellow card) 73'; Agougil (red card) 74'; Vet (yellow card) 90+6'	Stadium: Sportpark De Toekomst; Attendance: 1,422; Referee: Jannick van der Laan

16 September 2022 7	MVV Maastricht	4−1	Jong Ajax	Maastricht
20:00 CEST	Remans 10', (yellow card) 64'; Blummel 28'; Džepar (yellow card) 56'; Kostons 68', (yellow card) 75'; Van Bommel 85'	Report	Misehouy 53'	Stadium: De Geusselt; Attendance: 5,775; Referee: Michael Eijgelsheim

30 September 2022 9	PEC Zwolle	1−1	Jong Ajax	Zwolle
20:00 CEST	Görlich (yellow card) 11'; Schendelaar (red card) 12'; Medunjanin 62'	Report	Pierie (yellow card) 26'; Hlynsson 80'; Milovanović (yellow card) 84'	Stadium: MAC³PARK stadion Attendance: 13,505; Referee: Clay Ruperti

7 October 2022 10	Jong Ajax	0−1	Helmond Sport	Duivendrecht
20:00 CEST	Aertssen (yellow card) 81'	Report	Lieftink 2'; Chacón (yellow card) 23'; Mistrafović (yellow card) 84'; Van Vlerken (yellow card) 90+3'	Stadium: Sportpark De Toekomst; Referee: Stan Teuben

14 October 2022 11	Almere City	2−3	Jong Ajax	Almere
20:00 CEST	Royo 27'; Hilterman 51'; Peña (yellow card) 53'; Barbet (yellow card) 65'	Report	Rasmussen 20', (yellow card) 89'; Lucca 37'; Martha 78'	Stadium: Yanmar Stadion; Attendance: 2,612; Referee: Kevin Puts

24 October 2022 12	Jong Ajax	1−1	VVV-Venlo	Duivendrecht
20:00 CEST	Rasmussen 31'; Milovanović (yellow card) 49'; Vos (yellow card) 67'	Report	Braken 29'	Stadium: Sportpark De Toekomst; Attendance: 1,030; Referee: Luuk Timmer

31 October 2022 13	Jong Ajax	1−2	Willem II	Duivendrecht
20:00 CET	Hansen 21'; Fitz-Jim (yellow card) 90+1'	Report	Bokila 48'; Woudenberg 75'; Verreth (yellow card) 89'	Stadium: Sportpark De Toekomst; Attendance: 1,407; Referee: Martijn Vos

4 November 2022 14	FC Dordrecht	3−4	Jong Ajax	Dordrecht
20:00 CET	Longo 31'; Pinas 40'; Suray 59'; Schuurman (yellow card) 63'	Report	Hlynsson 10', 78'; Gooijer (yellow card) 14'; Rasmussen 47'; Hansen 49'; Pierie (yellow card) 90+5'	Stadium: Matchoholic Stadion; Attendance: 2,433; Referee: Nick Smit

14 November 2022 15	Jong Ajax	4−4	FC Den Bosch	Duivendrecht
20:00 CET	Rasmussen 16', 58'; Fitz-Jim 35'; Regeer (yellow card) 40'; Hansen (yellow card) 40'; Vos 50'; Pierie (yellow card) 90+1'	Report	Verbeek (yellow card) 8'; Möller 41', 83'; Van Grunsven 52'; Aertssen 77' (o.g.)	Stadium: Sportpark De Toekomst; Attendance: 742; Referee: Robin Hensgens

17 November 2022 16	Jong AZ	1−1	Jong Ajax	Alkmaar
21:00 CET	Reverson 82' (pen.), (yellow card) 88'	Report	Rasmussen 41'	Stadium: AFAS Trainingscomplex; Attendance: 744; Referee: Clay Ruperti

11 December 2022 17	Jong Ajax	1−2	Jong FC Utrecht	Duivendrecht
14:30 CET	Hlynsson 41'; Gooijer (yellow card) 45+2'	Report	Reijnders (yellow card) 30'; Mamengi 40'; Ikeshita (yellow card) 54' (yellow-red card) 82'; Rawlins (yellow card) 70'; Rijks 73'	Stadium: Sportpark De Toekomst; Attendance: 1,008; Referee: Wouter Wiersma

15 December 2022 18	Jong PSV	2−2	Jong Ajax	Eindhoven
20:00 CET	Tielemans 52'; Jiménez (yellow card) 74'	Report	Banel 39'; Vos 58'	Stadium: Philips Stadion; Attendance: 8,860; Referee: Michael Eijgelsheim

6 January 2023 19	Jong Ajax	1−1	FC Eindhoven	Duivendrecht
20:00 CET	Warmerdam (yellow card) 58'; Banel 86'	Report	Rottier 47'; Rêgo (yellow card) 90+2'	Stadium: Sportpark De Toekomst; Attendance: 887; Referee: Jesse Rozendal

13 January 2023 20	De Graafschap	3−0	Jong Ajax	Doetinchem
20:00 CET	Benschop 26', 83'; Haen 90+2'	Report	Gooijer (yellow card) 36'; Hlynsson (red card) 42'; Viereck (red card) 60'	Stadium: De Vijverberg; Attendance: 10,054; Referee: Luuk Timmer

23 January 2023 21	Jong Ajax	1−2	Roda JC Kerkrade	Duivendrecht
20:00 CET	Warmerdam 24'; Regeer (yellow card) 83'	Report	Vente 41'; Warmerdam 45+3' (o.g.)	Stadium: Sportpark De Toekomst; Attendance: 624; Referee: Kevin Puts

27 January 2023 22	Helmond Sport	1−1	Jong Ajax	Helmond
20:00 CET	Van Ooijen 60'	Report	Rasmussen 60'; Hato (yellow card) 70'; Vos (yellow card) 86'	Stadium: GS Staalwerken Stadion; Attendance: 3,145; Referee: Michael Eijgelsheim

6 February 2023 23	Jong Ajax	0−0	PEC Zwolle	Duivendrecht
20:00 CET	Rasmussen (penalty missed) 90+1'; Misehouy (yellow card) 90+4'	Report	Zitman (yellow card) 31' (yellow-red card) 90'; Van Hintum (yellow card) 90+2'; Van den Belt (yellow card) 90+4'	Stadium: Sportpark De Toekomst; Attendance: 1,430; Referee: Stan Teuben

10 February 2023 24	FC Den Bosch	4−2	Jong Ajax	's-Hertogenbosch
20:00 CET	Ahannach 17'; Konings 49', 66'; Verbeek (yellow card) 51'; Kalinauskas (yellow card) 77'; Hammouti 83'	Report	Rasmussen (yellow card) 24'; Hato 33'; Hlynsson 38'; Warmerdam (yellow card) 90'	Stadium: De Vliert; Attendance: 3,953; Referee: Wouter Wiersma

20 February 2023 25	Jong Ajax	4−2	MVV Maastricht	Duivendrecht
20:00 CET	Fitz-Jim 5'; Conceição 8'; Godts 51'; Gooijer (yellow card) 79'; Banel 90+4'	Report	Remans (yellow card) 21'; Blummel 31', (yellow card) 47'; Steuckers 65'; Essers (yellow card) 83'; Waem (yellow card) 84'	Stadium: Sportpark De Toekomst; Attendance: 755; Referee: Laurens Gerrets

24 February 2023 26	Willem II	2−1	Jong Ajax	Tilburg
20:00 CET	Heerkens 11', (yellow card) 45'; Svensson 25'	Report	Vos (yellow card) 37'; Hlynsson 45+1'; Banel (yellow card) 74'	Stadium: Koning Willem II Stadion; Attendance: 13,231; Referee: Martijn Vos

6 March 2023 27	Jong Ajax	1−2	TOP Oss	Duivendrecht
20:00 CET	Hlynsson 61'	Report	Mukeh (yellow card) 32'; Stuy van den Herik 41'; Tejan 57'	Stadium: Sportpark De Toekomst; Attendance: 479; Referee: Robin Hensgens

10 March 2023 28	FC Eindhoven	5−1	Jong Ajax	Eindhoven
20:00 CET	Amevor 22'; Rottier 35'; Van Doorm 64'; Dahlhaus 76'; Sanoh 88'	Report	Hlynsson 31', (penalty missed) 84'	Stadium: Jan Louwers Stadion; Attendance: 2,736; Referee: Clay Ruperti

13 March 2023 30	NAC Breda	2−6	Jong Ajax	Breda
20:00 CET	Martina (yellow card) 45'; Ómarsson 60'; Van der Sande 66'	Report	Warmerdam 4'; Van Axel Dongen 17'; Baas 21'; Fitz-Jim (yellow card) 24'; Lucca 34', (yellow card) 45'; Conceição 51', (yellow card) 71'; Regeer 86'	Stadium: Rat Verlegh Stadion; Attendance: 16,184; Referee: Jesse Rozendal

17 March 2023 29	Jong Ajax	0−2	Almere City	Duivendrecht
20:00 CET	Godts (yellow card) 32' (yellow-red card) 53'; Idumbo Muzambo (yellow card) 73'	Report	Hilterman 40'; Duijvestijn 48' (pen.), (yellow card) 90+1'; Akujobi (yellow card) 49'; Barbet (yellow card) 58'; Grootfaam (yellow card) 71'	Stadium: Sportpark De Toekomst; Attendance: 830; Referee: Robin Vereijken

3 April 2023 31	Jong Ajax	4−1	FC Dordrecht	Duivendrecht
20:00 CEST	Vos 21', 90+3', (yellow card) 53'; Jermoumi 40'; Aertssen 79'	Report	Touré 35'; Van Huizen (yellow card) 50'; Van der Avert (yellow card) 74'	Stadium: Sportpark De Toekomst; Referee: Luuk Timmer

7 April 2023 32	SC Telstar	2−3	Jong Ajax	Velsen
20:00 CEST	Apau (yellow card) 39'; Plet 72', 90+5'; Soares (yellow card) 90+2'	Report	Martha 28', (yellow card) 55'; Fitz-Jim 57', (yellow card) 45+2'; Misehouy 77'; De Graaff (yellow card) 87'	Stadium: BUKO Stadion; Attendance: 3,571; Referee: Michael Eijgelsheim

17 April 2022 33	Jong Ajax	5−4	Jong PSV	Duivendrecht
20:00 CEST	Lucca 16'; Godts 24'; Conceição 34', 59'; Seelt 49' (o.g.)	Report	Saibari 41'; Colyn 45'; Leysen 54'; Seelt (yellow card) 79'; Babadi 90+3'	Stadium: Sportpark De Toekomst; Attendance: 1,449; Referee: Nick Smit

24 April 2023 34	Jong FC Utrecht	1−0	Jong Ajax	Utrecht
20:00 CEST	Rawlins (yellow card) 30'; Timber (yellow card) 90+5'; Descotte 90+7' (pen.)	Report	Vos (yellow card) 61'; Warmerdam (yellow card) 88'; Baas (yellow card) 90+3'; Banel (red card) 90+6'	Stadium: Sportcomplex Zoudenbalch; Attendance: 345; Referee: Wouter Wiersma

28 April 2023 35	VVV-Venlo	0−1	Jong Ajax	Venlo
20:00 CEST	De Boer (yellow card) 61'; Sedláček (yellow card) 78'; Braken (yellow card) 82'	Report	Delgado (yellow card) 13'; Hlynsson 83' (pen.); De Graaff (yellow card) 90+2'	Stadium: De Koel; Attendance: 6,356; Referee: Jesse Rozendal

8 May 2023 36	Jong Ajax	4−2	ADO Den Haag	Duivendrecht
20:00 CEST	Hlynsson 19', 61'; Warmerdam 36'; Regeer (yellow card) 54'; Lucca (yellow card) 58'; Godts 73'	Report	Kemper 51', (yellow card) 53'; Guillem (red card) 53'; Asante (yellow card) 58'; Verheydt 76'	Stadium: Sportpark De Toekomst; Attendance: 444; Referee: Martin Pérez

12 May 2023 37	Jong Ajax	1−2	Jong AZ Alkmaar	Duivendrecht
20:00 CEST	Regeer (yellow card) 57'; Martha (yellow card) 62', (goal) 86'; Vos (yellow card) 63'	Report	Buurmeester 52'; Barası (yellow card) 64'; Stam (yellow card) 69'; Griffith 74'; Poku (yellow card) 79'	Stadium: Sportpark De Toekomst; Attendance: 1,569; Referee: Clay Ruperti

19 May 2023 38	Heracles Almelo	2−0	Jong Ajax	Almelo
20:00 CEST	Armenteros 23'; Schoofs 71'; Bruns (yellow card) 84'	Report	Aertssen (yellow card) 69'	Stadium: Erve Asito; Attendance: 12,080; Referee: Jochem Kamphuis

== Statistics ==
=== Appearances and goals ===
No.	Pos.	Nat	Name	Total		Eerste Divisie		Discipline		
No.	Pos.	Nat	Name	Apps	Goals	Apps	Goals	Yellow card	Second yellow card	Red card
	GK	(Netherlands) NED	Tom de Graaff	25	0	25	0	2	0	0
	GK	(Netherlands) NED	Sten Kremers	4	0	4	0	0	0	0
	GK	(England) ENG	Charlie Setford	9	0	9	0	0	0	0
	DF	(Netherlands) NED	Olivier Aertssen	36	1	31+5	1	2	0	0
	DF	(Netherlands) NED	Tristan Gooijer	24	0	19+5	0	4	0	0
	DF	(Netherlands) NED	Jorrel Hato	13	1	12+1	1	1	0	0
	DF	(Morocco) MAR	Diyae Jermoumi	22	1	8+14	1	2	0	0
	DF	(Serbia) SRB	Mateja Milovanović	12	0	7+5	0	3	0	0
	MF	(Netherlands) NED	Julian Brandes	4	0	0+4	0	0	0	0
	MF	(Ecuador) ECU	Patrickson Delgado	16	0	3+13	0	1	0	0
	MF	(Iceland) ISL	Kristian Hlynsson	37	10	37	10	0	0	1
	MF	(Netherlands) NED	Gabriel Misehouy	27	4	14+13	4	1	0	0
	MF	(Netherlands) NED	Silvano Vos	31	4	24+7	4	7	0	0
	MF	(Netherlands) NED	Donny Warmerdam	36	5	34+2	5	6	0	0
	FW	(Netherlands) NED	Amourricho van Axel Dongen	14	2	8+6	2	0	0	0
	FW	(Netherlands) NED	Jaydon Banel	25	3	14+11	3	1	0	1
	FW	(Belgium) BEL	Mika Godts	11	3	8+3	3	0	1	0
	FW	(Netherlands) NED	Sontje Hansen	23	4	14+9	4	1	0	1
	FW	(Netherlands) NED	Ar'jany Martha	30	3	13+17	3	3	0	0
	FW	(Denmark) DEN	Christian Rasmussen	29	9	27+2	9	2	0	0
First team players who have made appearances for reserve squad:
	DF	(Netherlands) NED	Youri Baas	10	1	10	1	1	0	0
	DF	(Netherlands) NED	Kik Pierie	15	1	15	1	5	0	0
	MF	(Netherlands) NED	Kian Fitz-Jim	30	3	30	3	4	0	0
	MF	(Netherlands) NED	Youri Regeer	26	1	26	1	5	0	0
	FW	(Netherlands) NED	Brian Brobbey	1	0	1	0	0	0	0
	FW	(Portugal) POR	Francisco Conceição	7	5	7	5	1	0	0
	FW	(Italy) ITA	Lorenzo Lucca	14	6	14	6	2	0	0
	FW	(Netherlands) NED	Naci Ünüvar	1	0	1	0	0	0	0
Youth players who have made appearances for reserve squad:
	DF	(Netherlands) NED	Oualid Agougil	1	0	0+1	0	0	0	0
	DF	(Netherlands) NED	Chahine van Bohemen	2	0	1+1	0	0	0	0
	DF	(Morocco) MAR	Rida Chahid	1	0	0+1	0	0	0	0
	DF	(Netherlands) NED	Alvaro Henry	2	0	0+2	0	0	0	0
	DF	(Netherlands) NED	Neal Viereck	2	0	0+2	0	0	0	1
	MF	(Belgium) BEL	Stanis Idumbo Muzambo	12	0	1+11	0	1	0	0
	FW	(Netherlands) NED	David Kalokoh	2	0	0+2	0	0	0	0
	FW	(Netherlands) NED	Raphaël Sarfo	1	0	0+1	0	0	0	0
Players sold or loaned out after the start of the season:
	FW	(Brazil) BRA	Giovanni	5	1	0+5	1	0	0	0
	FW	(Denmark) DEN	Jeppe Kjær	2	0	0+2	0	0	0	0

Last updated: 19 May 2023
Source: Competitions

=== Clean sheets ===
Rank	Pos	Nat	Name	Eerste Divisie	Matches
1	GK	(Netherlands)	Tom de Graaff	2	25
2	GK	(England)	Charlie Setford	1	9
3	GK	(Netherlands)	Sten Kremers	0	4
Totals				3	38

Last updated: 19 May 2023
