= 2021–22 Jong Ajax season =

Jong Ajax
2021–22 season
- Chairman: Hennie Henrichs
- Manager: John Heitinga
- Stadium: Sportpark De Toekomst
- Eerste Divisie: 7th
- Top goalscorer: League: Naci Ünüvar (16 goals); All: Naci Ünüvar (16 goals)
Home colours	Away colours

During the 2021–22 season, Jong Ajax participated in the Dutch Eerste Divisie, the 2nd tier of professional football in the Netherlands. It was their 9th consecutive season in the Eerste Divisie.

== Squad ==
As of 31 January 2022

Note: Flags indicate national team as defined under FIFA eligibility rules; some limited exceptions apply. Players may hold more than one non-FIFA nationality.

No.	Pos.	Nation	Player
35	DF	(Netherlands) NED	Youri Baas
37	FW	(Netherlands) NED	Naci Ünüvar
38	MF	(Iceland) ISL	Kristian Hlynsson
39	FW	(Denmark) DEN	Christian Rasmussen
40	FW	(Netherlands) NED	Sontje Hansen
41	MF	(Netherlands) NED	Enric Llansana
42	FW	(Netherlands) NED	Ar'jany Martha
43	DF	(Netherlands) NED	Nordin Musampa
44	MF	(Netherlands) NED	Youri Regeer
45	MF	(Netherlands) NED	Donny Warmerdam
46	DF	(Netherlands) NED	Anass Salah-Eddine

No.	Pos.	Nation	Player
47	DF	(Netherlands) NED	Steven van der Sloot
50	MF	(Netherlands) NED	Kian Fitz-Jim
51	GK	(England) ENG	Charlie Setford
52	GK	(Netherlands) NED	Calvin Raatsie
53	DF	(Netherlands) NED	Liam van Gelderen
54	DF	(Netherlands) NED	Rio Hillen
55	MF	(Netherlands) NED	Gibson Yah
56	FW	(Netherlands) NED	Amourricho van Axel Dongen
—	GK	(Netherlands) NED	Joey Roggeveen
—	MF	(Ecuador) ECU	Patrickson Delgado (on loan from Independiente del Valle)

== Transfers ==
For a list of all Dutch football transfers in the summer window (1 July 2021 to 31 August 2021) please see List of Dutch football transfers summer 2021. For a list of all Dutch football transfers in the winter window (1 January 2022 to 1 February 2022) please see List of Dutch football transfers winter 2021–22.

=== Summer ===
In:

No.	Pos.	Nation	Player
—	GK	(Netherlands) NED	Joey Roggeveen (from FC Volendam)
—	GK	(England) ENG	Charlie Setford (from Ajax U18)
—	DF	(Netherlands) NED	Julius Dirksen (from Ajax U18)
—	DF	(Netherlands) NED	Rio Hillen (from Ajax U18)
—	MF	(Iceland) ISL	Kristian Hlynsson (from Ajax U18)
—	MF	(Netherlands) NED	Gibson Yah (from Ajax U18)
—	FW	(Netherlands) NED	Amourricho van Axel Dongen (from Ajax U18)

Out:

No.	Pos.	Nation	Player
9	FW	(Brazil) BRA	Danilo (to Ajax, previously on loan at FC Twente)
30	FW	(Netherlands) NED	Brian Brobbey (to (Germany) RB Leipzig)
35	DF	(Netherlands) NED	Neraysho Kasanwirjo (to FC Groningen)
38	MF	(United States) USA	Alex Mendez (to (Portugal) Vizela)
42	MF	(Netherlands) NED	Quinten Timber (to FC Utrecht)
51	GK	(Netherlands) NED	Daan Reiziger (to SBV Vitesse)
—	GK	(Netherlands) NED	Nick Hengelman (released, later signed with (Bulgaria) Pirin Blagoevgrad)
—	MF	(Turkey) TUR	Tunahan Taşçı (to Jong Fortuna Sittard)
—	FW	(Netherlands) NED	Jaymillio Pinas (released, later signed with FC Dordrecht)

=== Winter ===
In:

No.	Pos.	Nation	Player
—	MF	(Ecuador) ECU	Patrickson Delgado (on loan from (Ecuador) Independiente del Valle)

Out:

No.	Pos.	Nation	Player
26	MF	(Denmark) DEN	Victor Jensen (on loan at (Norway) Rosenborg BK)
36	FW	(Brazil) BRA	Giovanni (on loan at SC Telstar)
48	DF	(Netherlands) NED	Terrence Douglas (on loan at FC Den Bosch)
49	FW	(Netherlands) NED	Max de Waal (on loan at PEC Zwolle)
—	DF	(Netherlands) NED	Julius Dirksen (to FC Emmen)

== Pre-season and friendlies ==
Win Draw Loss Fixtures

17 July 2021	Jong Ajax (Netherlands)	1–4	(Netherlands) FC Emmen	Duivendrecht, Netherlands
14:00 CEST	Martha 28'	Report	Veldmate 15'; Van Ooijen 23'; Hilterman 37', 46'	Stadium: Sportpark De Toekomst

21 July 2021	Jong AZ	1−3	Jong Ajax	Alkmaar, Netherlands
17:00 CEST	Van Brederode 40' (pen.)	Report	Hansen 50'; Kjær 51'; Rasmussen 79'	Stadium: AFAS Trainingscomplex

31 July 2021	FC Volendam	4−2	Jong Ajax	Volendam, Netherlands
18:45 CEST	Van Mieghem (yellow card) 31'; El Kadiri 34'; Mühren 40', 56'	Report	De Waal (yellow card) 55'; Warmerdam 75'	Stadium: Kras Stadion

== Competitions ==
=== Eerste Divisie ===
==== League table ====
Pos	Team	Pld	W	D	L	GF	GA	GD	Pts	Promotion or qualification
5	Roda JC Kerkrade	38	18	12	8	77	50	+27	66	Qualification to promotion play-offs
6	Excelsior (Note: Winner of the Second Period (Rounds 10–19)) (O, P)	38	19	9	10	82	57	+25	66	Qualification to promotion play-offs
7	Jong Ajax	38	18	9	11	82	63	+19	63	Reserve teams are not eligible to be promoted to the Eredivisie
8	NAC Breda	38	16	11	11	60	45	+15	59	Qualification to promotion play-offs
9	De Graafschap	38	15	11	12	52	43	+9	56	Qualification to promotion play-offs

Updated to match(es) played on 6 May 2022. Source: Soccerway, Keuken Kampioen Divisie (in Dutch)
Rules for classification: Season in progress: 1) Most points won; 2) Less points lost; 3) Goal difference; 4) Goals scored; 5) Alphabetical order; End of season: 1) Points; 2) Goal difference; 3) Goals scored; 4) Head-to-head points; 5) Head-to-head goal difference; 6) Head-to-head away goals scored; 7) Play-off if relevant for deciding champion, relegation or participating in a European league, otherwise by draw. 8) Penalty shoot-out (only after a play-off)
(O) Play-off winners; (P) Promoted

==== Period 1 ====
Pos	Team	Pld	W	D	L	GF	GA	GD	Pts	Qualification
9	VVV-Venlo	9	4	1	4	11	11	0	13	
10	FC Eindhoven	9	4	1	4	13	14	−1	13	
11	Jong Ajax	9	4	0	5	20	20	0	12	Reserves teams cannot participate in the promotion play-offs
12	Telstar	9	3	3	3	10	14	−4	12	
13	MVV Maastricht	9	4	0	5	13	26	−13	12	

Source: Keuken Kampioen Divisie (in Dutch)
Rules for classification: 1) points; 2) goal difference; 3) number of goals scored

==== Period 2 ====
Pos	Team	Pld	W	D	L	GF	GA	GD	Pts	Qualification
1	Excelsior	10	8	1	1	29	13	+16	25	Qualification to promotion play-offs
2	FC Volendam	10	7	3	0	25	12	+13	24	
3	Jong Ajax	10	7	3	0	24	11	+13	24	Reserves teams cannot participate in the promotion play-offs
4	ADO Den Haag	10	7	1	2	22	10	+12	22	Period 1 winner
5	FC Emmen	10	6	2	2	14	7	+7	20	

Source: Keuken Kampioen Divisie (in Dutch)
Rules for classification: 1) points; 2) goal difference; 3) number of goals scored

==== Period 3 ====
Pos	Team	Pld	W	D	L	GF	GA	GD	Pts	Qualification
10	Jong PSV	9	4	1	4	17	12	+5	13	Reserves teams cannot participate in the promotion play-offs
11	De Graafschap	9	3	4	2	9	6	+3	13	
12	Jong Ajax	9	4	1	4	13	15	−2	13	Reserves teams cannot participate in the promotion play-offs
13	Excelsior	9	3	2	4	13	14	−1	11	Period 2 winner
14	Telstar	9	2	3	4	8	14	−6	9	

Source: Keuken Kampioen Divisie (in Dutch)
Rules for classification: 1) points; 2) goal difference; 3) number of goals scored

==== Period 4 ====
Pos	Team	Pld	W	D	L	GF	GA	GD	Pts	Qualification
6	FC Den Bosch	10	5	2	3	12	11	+1	17	
7	ADO Den Haag	10	4	3	3	17	17	0	15	Period 1 winner
8	Jong Ajax	10	3	5	2	25	17	+8	14	Reserves teams cannot participate in the promotion play-offs
9	Excelsior	10	3	5	2	22	18	+4	14	Period 2 winner
10	Jong AZ	10	4	2	4	12	11	+1	14	Reserves teams cannot participate in the promotion play-offs

Source: Keuken Kampioen Divisie (in Dutch)
Rules for classification: 1) points; 2) goal difference; 3) number of goals scored

==== Results summary ====
Overall								Home						Away					
Pld	W	D	L	GF	GA	GD	Pts	W	D	L	GF	GA	GD	W	D	L	GF	GA	GD
38	18	9	11	82	63	+19	63	12	4	3	51	28	+23	6	5	8	31	35	−4

Last updated: 6 May 2022.
Source: Keuken Kampionen Divisie

==== Results by round ====
Round	1	2	3	4	5	6	7	8	9	10	11	12	13	14	15	16	17	18	19	20	21	22	23	24	25	26	27	28	29	30	31	32	33	34	35	36	37	38
Ground	A	H	A	H	H	A	A	H	A	A	H	A	H	A	H	H	A	H	A	H	A	H	A	H	H	A	H	A	H	A	H	H	A	A	A	H	A	H
Result	L	L	W	L	W	L	W	W	L	D	W	W	W	W	W	D	W	W	D	D	W	W	L	W	W	L	L	L	W	D	D	W	D	D	L	W	L	D
Position	18	19	14	18	13	15	13	10	11	12	9	5	5	5	3	5	4	3	4	5	5	4	5	3	3	3	5	6	6	6	6	5	6	7	7	7	7	7

Updated to match(es) played on 6 May 2022. Source: Keuken Kampionen Divisie
A = Away; H = Home; W = Win; D = Draw; L = Loss

==== Matches ====
8 August 2021 1	ADO Den Haag	2−0	Jong Ajax	The Hague
12:15 CEST	Asante (yellow card) 8'; Ćatić 51'; Verheydt 86'; Kemper (yellow card) 90+4'	Report		Stadium: Cars Jeans Stadion; Attendance: 3,057; Referee: Ingmar Oostrom

16 August 2021 2	Jong Ajax	1−2	FC Dordrecht	Duivendrecht
20:00 CEST	De Waal 33'; Douglas (yellow card) 90+7'	Report	Agrafiotis (yellow card) 10', (goal) 84', 90'; Hölscher (yellow card) 52'; Baggerman (yellow card) 73'	Stadium: Sportpark De Toekomst; Referee: Martijn Vos

20 August 2021 3	FC Den Bosch	2−3	Jong Ajax	's-Hertogenbosch
20:00 CEST	Kuijpers 1', 90+5'; Leijten (yellow card) 50'; Salasiwa (yellow card) 90+6'	Report	De Waal 23', 53'; Martha (yellow card) 47'; Van Gelderen (yellow card) 59'; Fitz-Jim (yellow card) 66'; Ünüvar 68'; Warmerdam (yellow card) 78'	Stadium: De Vliert; Attendance: 3,167; Referee: Martin Pérez

27 August 2021 4	Jong Ajax	1−2	Excelsior	Duivendrecht
20:00 CEST	Baas (yellow card) 40'; Fitz-Jim (yellow card) 48'; Warmerdam (yellow card) 61'; Van Gelderen (yellow card) 86'; Taylor 89' (pen.); Gorter (yellow card) 90'; Regeer (yellow card) 90'	Report	Niemeijer (penalty missed) 14'; El Yaakoubi 49'; Baas (yellow card) 51'; Nieuwpoort (yellow card) 77'; Azarkan 76'; Wieffer (yellow card) 90'	Stadium: Sportpark De Toekomst; Referee: Joey Kooij

10 September 2021 6	Jong PSV	3−1	Jong Ajax	Eindhoven
20:00 CET	Thomas 46'; Sealy 55'; Bakayoko 79', (yellow card) 82'	Report	Regeer 23'; Fitz-Jim (yellow card) 89'	Stadium: De Herdgang; Attendance: 1,258; Referee: Jesse Rozendal

13 September 2021 5	Jong Ajax	6−3	NAC Breda	Duivendrecht
20:00 CEST	Hillen (yellow card) 6'; Danilo 10'; Taylor 12'; Jensen 20', (yellow card) 83'; Baas 25'; Regeer 59'; De Waal 78'	Report	Seuntjens 3', 81'; Antonia (yellow card) 28'; Bakker (yellow card) 67'; Haye 70'; Malona (yellow card) 77'	Stadium: Sportpark De Toekomst; Attendance: 554; Referee: Ingmar Oostrom

17 September 2021 7	Almere City	2−4	Jong Ajax	Almere
20:00 CEST	Duijvestijn 11'; Woud (yellow card) 82'; Wildeboer 88'	Report	Kudus 20'; De Waal 54' (pen.), 76', 83' (pen.); Musampa (yellow card) 87'; Van Gelderen (yellow card) 90+4'	Stadium: Yanmar Stadion; Attendance: 2,652; Referee: Robin Hensgens

27 September 2021 8	Jong Ajax	3−1	MVV Maastricht	Duivendrecht
20:00 CEST	Hillen (yellow card) 20'; Rensch (yellow card) 22'; Danilo 33' (pen.), 60'; Ünüvar 45+1'	Report	Blummel (penalty missed) 23'; Zeegers (yellow card) 30'; Džepar 90+4'	Stadium: Sportpark De Toekomst; Attendance: 450; Referee: Martin Pérez

1 October 2021 9	Helmond Sport	3−1	Jong Ajax	Helmond
20:00 CEST	Van Landschoot 41', 78'; Dolet 50'	Report	Ünüvar 14'; Fitz-Jim (yellow card) 62'	Stadium: Stadion De Braak; Attendance: 1,834; Referee: Nick Smit

15 October 2021 11	Jong Ajax	3−1	Jong FC Utrecht	Duivendrecht
20:00 CEST	Ünüvar 25', 77', (yellow card) 34'; Warmerdam (yellow card) 66'; Llansana (yellow card) 71'; Douglas (yellow card) 82', (goal) 88'	Report	Balk 12'	Stadium: Sportpark De Toekomst; Attendance: 592; Referee: Martijn Vos

18 October 2021 10	Jong AZ	1−1	Jong Ajax	Alkmaar
20:00 CEST	Jacobs (yellow card) 37'; Poku 38'; Barası (red card) 71'; Evjen (yellow card) 75'; Velthuis (yellow card) 82'	Report	De Waal 73'	Stadium: AFAS Trainingscomplex; Attendance: 800; Referee: Jesse Rozendal

22 October 2021 12	FC Eindhoven	1−3	Jong Ajax	Eindhoven
20:00 CEST	Sleegers (yellow card) 52'; Rácz 90+3'; Amevor (yellow card) 90+5' (yellow-red card) 90+5'	Report	Jensen 38', 90+1'; Taylor 41'; Martha (yellow card) 58'; Baas (yellow card) 60'	Stadium: Jan Louwers Stadion; Attendance: 2,106; Referee: Clay Ruperti

1 November 2021 13	Jong Ajax	3−0	SC Telstar	Duivendrecht
20:00 CET	Danilo 16'; Regeer (yellow card) 57'; Ünüvar 60', 66'	Report		Stadium: Sportpark De Toekomst; Attendance: 850; Referee: Sam Dröge

5 November 2021 14	VVV-Venlo	1−3	Jong Ajax	Venlo
20:00 CET	Van Rooijen 53'; Koglin (yellow card) 66'; Pachonik (yellow card) 71'; Van Crooij (yellow card) 90+5'	Report	Taylor 4'; Ünüvar 62'; Danilo 72' (pen.); Rensch (yellow card) 85' (yellow-red card) 86'; Gorter (yellow card) 87'; Douglas (yellow card) 90+5'	Stadium: Covebo Stadion – De Koel; Attendance: 4,777; Referee: Robin Gansner

19 November 2021 16	Jong Ajax	4−4	FC Volendam	Duivendrecht
20:00 CET	De Waal 7'; Regeer 13'; Rasmussen 17'; Taylor 30' (pen.); Van Axel Dongen (yellow card) 75'; Gorter (yellow card) 90+4'	Report	Oristanio 15'; Mühren 19'; B. Plat (yellow card) 29'; Twigt (yellow card) 75'; Kaars 88'; A. Plat (yellow card) 90+1'; Kasius 90+5'	Stadium: Sportpark De Toekomst; Attendance: 0 Referee: Robin Hensgens

22 November 2021 15	Jong Ajax	2−1	Roda JC Kerkrade	Duivendrecht
20:00 CET	Salah-Eddine 54'; Van Axel Dongen 82'	Report	Klaasen 70', (yellow card) 90+1'; Vente (penalty missed) 77'	Stadium: Sportpark De Toekomst; Attendance: 0 Referee: Jesse Rozendal

26 November 2021 17	De Graafschap	1−3	Jong Ajax	Doetinchem
20:00 CET	Konings 43'; Fortes (yellow card) 48'; Brittijn (yellow card) 53'	Report	Ünüvar 24'; Rasmussen 88'; Martha 90+1'	Stadium: De Vijverberg; Attendance: 0 Referee: Alex Bos

6 December 2021 18	Jong Ajax	1−0	FC Emmen	Duivendrecht
20:00 CET	Regeer (yellow card) 32', (goal) 60'; Warmerdam (yellow card) 90'	Report	Araujo (yellow card) 87'	Stadium: Sportpark De Toekomst; Attendance: 0 Referee: Jannick van der Laan

10 December 2021 19	TOP Oss	1−1	Jong Ajax	Oss
20:00 CET	Tejan 89'	Report	Llansana (yellow card) 45'; Musampa 54'; Van Gelderen (yellow card) 87'	Stadium: Frans Heesen Stadion; Attendance: 0 Referee: Martijn Vos

20 December 2021 20	Jong Ajax	1−1	Helmond Sport	Duivendrecht
20:00 CET	Llansana 70'; Van Gelderen (yellow card) 80'	Report	Van Landschoot 54'	Stadium: Sportpark De Toekomst; Attendance: 0 Referee: Robin Gansner

10 January 2022 21	Jong FC Utrecht	0−2	Jong Ajax	Utrecht
18:45 CET	Bonsu (yellow card) 10'; Huizing (yellow card) 42'	Report	Musampa (yellow card) 9'; Regeer 16'; Van der Sloot (yellow card) 81'; Rasmussen 90+1'	Stadium: Sportcomplex Zoudenbalch; Attendance: 0 Referee: Laurens Gerrets

17 January 2022 22	Jong Ajax	2−1	FC Den Bosch	Duivendrecht
20:00 CET	Rasmussen 24'; Musampa (yellow card) 74'; Ünüvar (yellow card) 79'; Martha 86'	Report	Van der Heijden (yellow card) 61'; Van Bakel 72'; Hornkamp (yellow card) 78'; Van Grunsven (yellow card) 80'	Stadium: Sportpark De Toekomst; Attendance: 0 Referee: Jesse Rozendal

23 January 2022 23	SC Telstar	1−0	Jong Ajax	Velsen
14:30 CET	Smit 26'; Tugarinov (yellow card) 45+1'; Aktaş (yellow card) 59'; Vlijter (yellow card) 69'; Van Velzen (yellow card) 90+7'	Report	Yah (yellow card) 72'; Banel (yellow card) 88'	Stadium: Rabobank IJmond Stadion; Attendance: 0 Referee: Robin Vereijken

4 February 2022 25	Jong Ajax	2−1	Jong AZ Alkmaar	Duivendrecht
20:00 CET	Daramy 6'; Goes 69' (o.g.)	Report	Goes (yellow card) 25'; Frankeb 79'	Stadium: Sportpark De Toekomst; Attendance: 0 Referee: Robin Gansner

7 February 2022 24	Jong Ajax	2−0	Jong PSV	Duivendrecht
20:00 CET	Ünüvar (yellow card) 52', (goal) 65' (pen.); Hansen 67' (pen.)	Report	Nassoh (yellow card) 58'; Fofana (yellow card) 62'	Stadium: Sportpark De Toekomst; Attendance: 0 Referee: Robin Gansner

11 February 2022 26	Excelsior	6−2	Jong Ajax	Rotterdam
20:00 CET	Salah-Eddine 32' (o.g.); Dallinga 38', 71'; Niemeijer 45+1'; El Yaakoubi 57'; Raatsie 90+3' (o.g.)	Report	Rasmussen 4'; Hillen (yellow card) 34'; Ünüvar (penalty missed) 43'; Van Gelderen 64'; Salah-Eddine (yellow card) 74'	Stadium: Van Donge & De Roo Stadion; Attendance: 0 Referee: Robin Hensgens

21 February 2022 27	Jong Ajax	1−3	Almere City	Duivendrecht
20:00 CET	Ünüvar 36'; Llansana (yellow card) 44'	Report	Puriel 11', 54'; Wildeboer 28'; Receveur (yellow card) 73'; Esajas (yellow card) 78'; Jacobs (yellow card) 90'	Stadium: Sportpark De Toekomst; Attendance: 728; Referee: Luca Cantineau

25 February 2022 28	FC Emmen	2−1	Jong Ajax	Emmen
20:00 CET	Kharchouch 56', 67'; Lieder (yellow card) 88'; Mendes (yellow card) 90+4'	Report	Hansen 45+1'; Regeer (yellow card) 57'; Van Gelderen (yellow card) 60'	Stadium: De Oude Meerdijk; Attendance: 7,303; Referee: Clay Ruperti

7 March 2022 29	Jong Ajax	6−3	ADO Den Haag	Duivendrecht
20:00 CET	Kudus 18', 41' (pen.), 64'; Danilo 35'; Ünüvar 54', 83' (pen.); Baas (yellow card) 72'	Report	Kishna 23'; Damen (yellow card) 41'; Verheydt 58'; Steijn 59'; Amofa (yellow card) 70'; Bourard (yellow card) 76'	Stadium: Sportpark De Toekomst; Attendance: 1,014; Referee: Robin Gansner

11 March 2022 30	FC Dordrecht	3−3	Jong Ajax	Dordrecht
20:00 CET	Suray 34'; Miceli 37'; Donkor 60'; Savastano (yellow card) 77'; Van Huizen (yellow card) 90'	Report	Vos 31'; Rasmussen 62'; Van der Sloot (red card) 85'; Raatsie (yellow card) 86'; Hlynsson 90+2' (pen.); Fitz-Jim (yellow card) 90+4'	Stadium: GN Bouw Stadion; Attendance: 2,054; Referee: Robin Vereijken

18 March 2022 31	Jong Ajax	2−2	FC Eindhoven	Duivendrecht
20:00 CET	Danilo 37' (pen.); Hansen (yellow card) 53', (goal) 82'; Musampa (yellow card) 66'	Report	Sleegers 12'; Van der Sande 46'	Stadium: Sportpark De Toekomst; Attendance: 953; Referee: Jannick van der Laan

1 April 2022 33	NAC Breda	0–0	Jong Ajax	Breda
20:00 CEST	Azzagari (yellow card) 70'	Report	Rasmussen (yellow card) 68'	Stadium: Rat Verlegh Stadion; Attendance: 17,231; Referee: Erwin Blank

4 April 2022 32	Jong Ajax	4−1	TOP Oss	Duivendrecht
20:00 CEST	Fitz-Jim (yellow card) 4'; Brobbey 16' (pen.); Taylor 33', 39'; Ihattaren 57'	Report	Guezen (yellow card) 51'; Fleuren 90+2'	Stadium: Sportpark De Toekomst; Attendance: 888; Referee: Martijn Vos

8 April 2022 34	Roda JC Kerkrade	2−2	Jong Ajax	Kerkrade
20:00 CEST	Jensen (yellow card) 18'; Pflücke 43'; Klaasen (yellow card) 48'; Vente 53'	Report	Ünüvar 15'; Hillen (yellow card) 28'; Hlynsson 59'	Stadium: Parkstad Limburg Stadion; Attendance: 13,001; Referee: Robin Gansner

16 April 2022 35	FC Volendam	3−1	Jong Ajax	Volendam
16:30 CEST	Mühren 27' (pen.), 74'; Oristanio 51', (yellow card) 83'	Report	Rasmussen 3'; Llansana (yellow card) 32' (red card) 40'; Van der Sloot (yellow card) 90+2'	Stadium: Kras Stadion; Attendance: 6,500; Referee: Sander van der Eijk

25 April 2022 36	Jong Ajax	6−1	VVV-Venlo	Duivendrecht
20:00 CEST	Kudus 22'; Ünüvar 52', 80' (pen.); Ihattaren 59', 62', 68'	Report	Schroijen 24'; Ngobi (yellow card) 27'; El Azrak (yellow card) 64'	Stadium: Sportpark De Toekomst; Referee: Nick Smit

29 April 2022 37	MVV Maastricht	1−0	Jong Ajax	Maastricht
20:00 CEST	Ntelo 39'; Souren (yellow card) 45'; Alberg (yellow card) 65'; Zeegers (yellow card) 71'	Report	Baas (yellow card) 24'; Fitz-Jim (yellow card) 45+1'	Stadium: De Geusselt; Attendance: 3,856; Referee: Robin Vereijken

6 May 2022 38	Jong Ajax	1−1	De Graafschap	Duivendrecht
20:00 CEST	Martha 78'	Report	Fortes 56'	Stadium: Sportpark De Toekomst; Attendance: 1,358; Referee: Martin Pérez

== Statistics ==
=== Appearances and goals ===
No.	Pos.	Nat	Name	Total		Eerste Divisie		Discipline		
No.	Pos.	Nat	Name	Apps	Goals	Apps	Goals	Yellow card	Second yellow card	Red card
	GK	(Netherlands) NED	Calvin Raatsie	12	0	11+1	0	1	0	0
	GK	(Netherlands) NED	Joey Roggeveen	1	0	1	0	0	0	0
	GK	(England) ENG	Charlie Setford	8	0	8	0	0	0	0
	DF	(Netherlands) NED	Youri Baas	23	1	20+3	1	4	0	0
	DF	(Netherlands) NED	Liam van Gelderen	29	1	18+11	1	6	0	0
	DF	(Netherlands) NED	Rio Hillen	17	0	14+3	0	4	0	0
	DF	(Netherlands) NED	Nordin Musampa	30	1	27+3	1	4	0	0
	DF	(Netherlands) NED	Anass Salah-Eddine	21	1	16+5	1	1	0	0
	DF	(Netherlands) NED	Steven van der Sloot	10	0	2+8	0	2	0	1
	MF	(Ecuador) ECU	Patrickson Delgado	8	0	1+7	0	0	0	0
	MF	(Netherlands) NED	Kian Fitz-Jim	34	0	32+2	0	7	0	0
	MF	(Iceland) ISL	Kristian Hlynsson	30	2	23+7	2	0	0	0
	MF	(Netherlands) NED	Enric Llansana	24	1	23+1	1	4	0	1
	MF	(Netherlands) NED	Youri Regeer	25	5	24+1	5	4	0	0
	MF	(Netherlands) NED	Donny Warmerdam	24	0	17+7	0	4	0	0
	MF	(Netherlands) NED	Gibson Yah	12	0	2+10	0	1	0	0
	FW	(Netherlands) NED	Amourricho van Axel Dongen	7	1	4+3	1	1	0	0
	FW	(Netherlands) NED	Sontje Hansen	23	3	14+9	3	1	0	0
	FW	(Netherlands) NED	Ar'jany Martha	28	3	11+17	3	2	0	0
	FW	(Denmark) DEN	Christian Rasmussen	36	7	23+13	7	1	0	0
	FW	(Netherlands) NED	Naci Ünüvar	32	16	28+4	16	3	0	0
First team players who have made appearances for reserve squad:
	GK	(Netherlands) NED	Jay Gorter	18	0	18	0	3	0	0
	DF	(Netherlands) NED	Devyne Rensch	5	0	5	0	2	1	0
	MF	(Ghana) GHA	Mohammed Kudus	5	5	5	5	0	0	0
	MF	(Netherlands) NED	Kenneth Taylor	11	7	11	7	0	0	0
	FW	(Netherlands) NED	Brian Brobbey	1	1	1	1	0	0	0
	FW	(Brazil) BRA	Danilo	9	7	9	7	0	0	0
	FW	(Denmark) DEN	Mohamed Daramy	9	1	9	1	0	0	0
	FW	(Netherlands) NED	Mohamed Ihattaren	5	4	4+1	4	0	0	0
Youth players who have made appearances for reserve squad:
	DF	(Netherlands) NED	Olivier Aertssen	3	0	3	0	0	0	0
	DF	(Netherlands) NED	Tristan Gooijer	5	0	5	0	0	0	0
	DF	(Netherlands) NED	Diyae Jermoumi	1	0	0+1	0	0	0	0
	MF	(Netherlands) NED	Jenno Campagne	1	0	0+1	0	0	0	0
	MF	(Netherlands) NED	Jay Enem	2	0	0+2	0	0	0	0
	MF	(Netherlands) NED	Gabriel Misehouy	4	0	0+4	0	0	0	0
	MF	(Netherlands) NED	Silvano Vos	5	1	1+4	1	0	0	0
	FW	(Netherlands) NED	Jaydon Banel	8	0	1+7	0	1	0	0
Players sold or loaned out after the start of the season:
	DF	(Netherlands) NED	Julius Dirksen	0	0	0	0	0	0	0
	DF	(Netherlands) NED	Terrence Douglas	11	1	2+9	1	3	0	0
	MF	(Denmark) DEN	Victor Jensen	11	3	10+1	3	1	0	0
	FW	(Brazil) BRA	Giovanni	8	0	2+6	0	0	0	0
	FW	(Netherlands) NED	Max de Waal	20	9	12+8	9	0	0	0

Last updated: 6 May 2022
Source: Competitions

=== Clean sheets ===
Rank	Pos	Nat	Name	Eerste Divisie	Matches
1	GK	(England)	Charlie Setford	2	8
2	GK	(Netherlands)	Jay Gorter	1	18
3	GK	(Netherlands)	Calvin Raatsie	1	11
4	GK	(Netherlands)	Joey Roggeveen	1	1
Totals				5	38

Last updated: 6 May 2022
