= Diyae Jermoumi =

Moroccan footballer (born 2004)

Personal information
- Full name: Diyae-Edinne Jermoumi
- Date of birth: 19 July 2004 (age 22)
- Place of birth: Leiden, Netherlands
- Height: 1.74 m (5 ft 9 in)
- Position: Right-back

Team information
- Current team: Jong Sparta

Youth career
- –2014: LVV Lugdunum
- 2014–2019: Sparta Rotterdam
- 2019–2021: Ajax

Senior career*
Years	Team	Apps	(Gls)
2021–2025	Jong Ajax	49	(1)
2025–2026	Cambuur	16	(0)
2026–	Jong Sparta	1	(0)

International career^{‡}
2022–2023	Morocco U20	7	(0)
- * Club domestic league appearances and goals as of 28 April 2026 ‡ National team caps and goals as of 23:44, 13 June 2023 (UTC)

Diyae-Edinne Jermoumi (born 19 July 2004) is a professional footballer who plays as a right-back for club Jong Sparta. Born in the Netherlands, he is a youth international for Morocco.

== Club career ==
=== Early career ===
Jermoumi began his career at Lugdunum in his hometown of Leiden before joining the academy of Sparta Rotterdam in 2014. In 2019, he moved to the Ajax Youth Academy, and in December 2021, he signed his first professional contract with the Amsterdam club.

He made his professional debut for Jong Ajax on 10 January 2022, coming on as a 74th-minute substitute for Giovanni in a 2–0 away win over Jong Utrecht in the 2021–22 Eerste Divisie.

=== Cambuur ===
On 9 July 2025, Jermoumi signed a one-year contract with an option for a further season with Cambuur of the Eerste Divisie.

=== Sparta Rotterdam ===
On 20 August 2026, Jermoumi returned to his youth club Sparta Rotterdam, where he was assigned to the reserve team competing in the third-tier Tweede Divisie. He made his debut on 12 September, replacing Noah Zandvliet in the 55th minute of a 2–2 home draw against Katwijk.

== International career ==
Born in the Netherlands, Jermoumi is of Moroccan descent and was under-17 selection. He debuted with the Morocco U20s in a friendly 2–0 loss to the Spain U20s on 28 April 2022.

== Career statistics ==
As of match played 12 September 2026

Appearances and goals by club, season and competition
Club	Season	League			Cup		Other		Total	
Club	Season	Division	Apps	Goals	Apps	Goals	Apps	Goals	Apps	Goals
Jong Ajax Amsterdam	2021–22	Eerste Divisie	1	0	—		—		1	0
Jong Ajax Amsterdam	2022–23	Eerste Divisie	22	1	—		—		22	1
Jong Ajax Amsterdam	2023–24	Eerste Divisie	10	0	—		—		10	0
Jong Ajax Amsterdam	2024–25	Eerste Divisie	16	0	—		—		16	0
Jong Ajax Amsterdam	Total		49	1	—		—		49	1
Cambuur	2025–26	Eerste Divisie	16	0	0	0	—		16	0
Jong Sparta	2026–27	Tweede Divisie	1	0	—		—		1	0
Career total			66	1	0	0	0	0	66	1
