= Amourricho van Axel Dongen =

Dutch footballer (born 2004)

Personal information
- Full name: Amourricho Jahvairo Déshauntino van Axel Dongen
- Date of birth: 29 September 2004 (age 22)
- Place of birth: Almere, Netherlands
- Height: 1.75 m (5 ft 9 in)
- Position: Left winger

Youth career
- 2010–2012: Zeeburgia
- 2012–2013: OSV Amsterdam
- 2013–2021: Ajax

Senior career*
Years	Team	Apps	(Gls)
2021–2024	Jong Ajax	31	(4)
2021–2026	Ajax	4	(0)
2025–2026	→ Heerenveen (loan)	7	(1)

International career
2019–2020	Netherlands U16	3	(1)
2021	Netherlands U18	1	(0)
- * Club domestic league appearances and goals as of 7 February 2026

Amourricho Jahvairo Déshauntino van Axel Dongen (born 29 September 2004) is a Dutch professional footballer who plays as a left winger.

== Club career ==
Born in Almere, Van Axel Dongen played youth football for Zeeburgia and OSV Amsterdam before joining the youth academy of Ajax. He signed his first professional contract with the club in September 2020. He made his professional debut for Jong Ajax as a starter on 7 May 2021 in a 1–1 draw against De Graafschap, playing until halftime for the team led by Mitchell van der Gaag. The following matchday, which was also the final of the season, he also appeared as a starter in a 2–1 away win over Telstar. Shortly before the break, Van Axel Dongen scored the opening goal after an assist by Kian Fitz-Jim, and he was substituted in the 62nd minute for Nordin Musampa. At the end of the 2020–21 season, Van Axel Dongen was awarded the Abdelhak Nouri trophy as the best talent of Ajax's youth academy that season.

Van Axel Dongen made his first-team debut for Ajax on 15 December 2021, replacing Mohamed Daramy in the 75th minute of a 4–0 win in the second round of the KNVB Cup over BVV Barendrecht. The following month, on 16 January 2022, he made his Eredivisie debut for the first team, coming on as a late substitute for Antony as Utrecht were beaten 3–0. In September 2022, Van Axel Dongen sprained his ankle in a match for Jong Ajax against NAC Breda, sidelining him for several months, before returning to action in January 2023.

Van Axel Dongen returned to first-team action in the 2023–24 season, in which he made his European debut, coming on as an 84th-minute substitute for Carlos Forbs in a UEFA Europa League group stage draw against AEK Athens. On 8 October 2023, he made his first ever start for Ajax in a 2–1 home loss against AZ. However, he was substituted in the first half, after suffering an injury.

On 15 July 2025, Van Axel Dongen joined Heerenveen on a season long loan deal.

On 2 September 2026, his contract with Ajax was mutually terminated.

== International career ==
Born in the Netherlands, Van Axel Dongen is of Surinamese descent. He is a current Dutch youth international.

== Career statistics ==
As of match played 7 February 2026

Appearances and goals by club, season and competition
Club	Season	League			National cup		Continental		Total	
Club	Season	Division	Apps	Goals	Apps	Goals	Apps	Goals	Apps	Goals
Jong Ajax	2020–21	Eerste Divisie	2	1	—		—		2	1
Jong Ajax	2021–22	Eerste Divisie	7	1	—		—		7	1
Jong Ajax	2022–23	Eerste Divisie	14	2	—		—		14	2
Jong Ajax	2023–24	Eerste Divisie	5	0	—		—		5	0
Jong Ajax	2024–25	Eerste Divisie	3	0	—		—		3	0
Jong Ajax	Total		31	4	—		—		31	4
Ajax	2021–22	Eredivisie	1	0	2	0	0	0	3	0
Ajax	2022–23	Eredivisie	0	0	0	0	0	0	0	0
Ajax	2023–24	Eredivisie	3	0	1	0	1 (Note: Appearance in UEFA Europa League)	0	5	0
Ajax	2026–27	Eredivisie	0	0	0	0	0	0	0	0
Ajax	Total		4	0	3	0	1	0	8	0
Heerenveen (loan)	2025–26	Eredivisie	7	1	2	0	—		9	1
Career total			42	5	5	0	1	0	48	5

== Honours ==
Ajax

- Eredivisie: 2021–22

Individual

- Ajax Talent of the Future (Abdelhak Nouri Trophy): 2020–21
