= Charlie Setford =

English footballer (born 2004)

Personal information
- Full name: Charlie Terence Setford
- Date of birth: 11 May 2004 (age 22)
- Place of birth: Haarlem, Netherlands
- Height: 6 ft 5 in (1.96 m)
- Position: Goalkeeper

Team information
- Current team: Jong Ajax
- Number: 51

Youth career
- 2011–2021: Ajax

Senior career*
Years	Team	Apps	(Gls)
2020–	Jong Ajax	56	(0)
2024–	Ajax	0	(0)
2026	→ Milton Keynes Dons (loan)	0	(0)

International career^{‡}
2019	Netherlands U15	3	(0)
2019	Netherlands U16	1	(0)
2019–2020	England U16	5	(0)
2021	England U18	4	(0)
- * Club domestic league appearances and goals as of 19 January 2026 ‡ National team caps and goals as of 10:13, 18 March 2022 (UTC)

Charlie Terence Setford (born 11 May 2004) is a professional footballer who plays as a goalkeeper for Eerste Divisie club Jong Ajax.

Born in the Netherlands, he represents England at youth level.

== Club career ==
=== Ajax ===
Setford was scouted by Ajax at age 7 (at Football club BSM in Bennebroek), and he has been part of the club ever since. He featured regularly at every level of the club's youth system. He signed a three-year contract with Ajax in June 2020. On 2 April 2021, aged 16, Setford made the bench for Jong Ajax in a league match for the first time. He made the bench on three more occasions before the end of the season.

Setford made his first appearance and start for Jong Ajax during the 2021–22 season in a league match on 20 August 2021 against FC Den Bosch. Aged only 17, this made him the youngest goalkeeper ever to play for Ajax. Jong Ajax won 3–2 and Setford made an important one-on-one save. Setford made a second start against MVV on 27 September, saving a penalty in a 3–1 win.

Setford also made the bench for the senior Ajax team for the league match against PEC Zwolle on 11 September 2021, and from then on has made regular appearances on the bench for the seniors, including in the UEFA Champions League match against Beşiktaş on 28 September 2021.

==== Milton Keynes Dons (loan) ====
On 2 February 2026, Setford joined EFL League Two club Milton Keynes Dons on loan for the remainder of the 2025–26 season, but failed to make a matchday squad for the duration of his loan before returning to his parent club.

== International career ==
Setford was born in the Netherlands to an English father and a Dutch mother, and is eligible to play for both England and the Netherlands at international level. He has played for both nations at youth level, playing a combined four appearances for Netherlands U15 and Netherlands U16 before 2020, as well as making five appearances for the England U16 team. However, Setford later announced that he had decided to commit to playing for England over the Netherlands at international level, explaining: "It was my own choice, and my family as well. My heart lays at England. At England, they've got more trust in me than they would at Holland, for my feeling. So that's one of the biggest reasons why I chose for England."

On 27 August 2021, Setford received his first call up to the England U18s. He made his first appearance on 3 September 2021, starting a 1–1 draw against Wales U18. On 18 March 2022, he received his first call up the England U20 squad.

Setford is considered one of the most exciting England prospects of his generation.

== Personal life ==
Charlie has a younger brother, Tommy Setford, who is also a goalkeeper and currently plays for Stevenage, on loan from Arsenal as well as the England U21s. Charlie and Tommy's father is English pro golfer Chris Setford, who has been living in the Netherlands due to his career.

Setford's favourite team other than Ajax is Southampton, as his English father is from Alton near the city. Setford says he and his family only speak English at home.

== Career statistics ==
As of 2 May 2026

Appearances and goals by club, season and competition
Club	Season	League			National Cup		Europe		Other		Total	
Club	Season	Division	Apps	Goals	Apps	Goals	Apps	Goals	Apps	Goals	Apps	Goals
Jong Ajax	2020–21	Eerste Divisie	0	0	—		—		—		0	0
Jong Ajax	2021–22	Eerste Divisie	8	0	—		—		—		8	0
Jong Ajax	2022–23	Eerste Divisie	9	0	—		—		—		9	0
Jong Ajax	2023–24	Eerste Divisie	19	0	—		—		—		19	0
Jong Ajax	2024–25	Eerste Divisie	20	0	—		—		—		20	0
Jong Ajax	Total		56	0	—		—		—		56	0
Ajax	2024–25	Eredivisie	0	0	0	0	0	0	0	0	0	0
Milton Keynes Dons (loan)	2025–26	League Two	0	0	—		—		—		0	0
Career total			56	0	0	0	0	0	0	0	56	0

== Honours ==
Individual

- Ajax Talent of the Future (Abdelhak Nouri Trophy): 2021–22
