= Sten Kremers =

Dutch footballers (born 2004)

Personal information
- Date of birth: 16 February 2004 (age 22)
- Place of birth: Lichtenvoorde, Netherlands
- Height: 1.88 m (6 ft 2 in)
- Position: Goalkeeper

Team information
- Current team: Heerenveen

Youth career
- Longa '30
- De Graafschap

Senior career*
Years	Team	Apps	(Gls)
2021–2024	Jong Ajax	5	(0)
2024–2026	De Graafschap	1	(0)
2026–	Heerenveen	0	(0)

International career^{‡}
2020	Netherlands U16	1	(0)
2022	Netherlands U18	1	(0)
2022	Netherlands U19	1	(0)
- * Club domestic league appearances and goals as of 24 April 2026 ‡ National team caps and goals as of 00:15, 4 October 2022 (UTC)

Sten Kremers (born 16 February 2004) is a Dutch goalkeeper who plays for Eredivisie club Heerenveen.

== Early life ==
From Lichtenvoorde, Kremers played with local amateur side Longa '30 and was in the youth academy at De Graafschap before joining up with the Ajax academy.

== Club career ==
In July 2021 Kremers signed his first professional contract with Ajax tying him to the club until 2024. Kremers made his professional debut in the Eerste Divisie for Jong Ajax against SC Telstar on 8 August 2022.

On 22 May 2024, Kremers was announced to be returning to De Graafschap on a two-year deal.

On 22 September 2026, Kremers signed with Eredivisie club Heerenveen for one season with an option to extend, following a trial.

== International career ==
In September 2022 Kremers was called up for the Dutch U19 team for matches against Slovenia, Northern Ireland and Moldova.

== Career statistics ==
As of match played 16 September 2022

Appearances and goals by club, season and competition
Club	Season	League			Cup		Europe		Other		Total	
Club	Season	Division	Apps	Goals	Apps	Goals	Apps	Goals	Apps	Goals	Apps	Goals
Jong Ajax	2022–23	Eerste Divisie	4	0	—		—		—		4	0
Jong Ajax	2023–24	Eerste Divisie	0	0	—		—		—		0	0
Career total			4	0	0	0	0	0	0	0	4	0
