= Jaydon Banel =

Dutch footballer (born 2004)

Personal information
- Full name: Jaydon Amauri Banel
- Date of birth: 19 October 2004 (age 22)
- Place of birth: Amsterdam, Netherlands
- Height: 1.72 m (5 ft 8 in)
- Position: Forward

Team information
- Current team: Burnley
- Number: 34

Youth career
- –2012: Zeeburgia
- 2012–2022: Ajax

Senior career*
Years	Team	Apps	(Gls)
2022–2025	Jong Ajax	85	(13)
2023–2025	Ajax	6	(0)
2025–	Burnley	4	(0)
2026	→ Derby County (loan)	14	(3)

International career
2022	Netherlands U18	2	(0)
2022	Netherlands U19	3	(0)
- * Club domestic league appearances and goals as of 09:43, 8 November 2026 (UTC)

Jaydon Amauri Banel (born 19 October 2004) is a Dutch professional footballer who plays as a forward for EFL Championship for EFL Championship club Burnley.

== Club career ==
During the 2021–22 season, Banel became a regular player with the Ajax youth team, notably shining in the UEFA Youth League. His professional debut for Jong Ajax came on 17 January 2022, in a home Eerste Divisie game against Den Bosch. He replaced Naci Ünüvar and played a crucial role in his team's 2–1 victory by providing an assist for Ar'jany Martha's goal.

On 3 June 2022, Banel signed his first professional contract with Ajax, keeping him at the club until 2025. He debuted the senior Ajax team in a 4–3 UEFA Europa League loss to Marseille on 30 November 2023.

On 3 February 2025, Banel joined EFL Championship club Burnley on a four-and-a-half-year deal for an undisclosed fee, reported to be €1 million. Banel made his debut for Burnley in a 3–0 FA Cup loss to Preston North End on 1 March 2025.

Banel made his league debut for Burnley in a 2–0 Premier League loss to Brighton & Hove Albion on 3 January 2026. He scored his first goal in a 5–1 FA Cup victory over Millwall on 10 January 2026.

On 29 January 2026, Banel joined EFL Championship club Derby County on loan until the end of the 2025–26 season. Banel made his debut for Derby County in a 5–0 Championship win at Bristol City on 30 January 2026 as a 70th-minute substitute for Rhian Brewster. Banel scored his first Derby County goal in a 2–0 Championship win over Stoke City on 6 April 2026, scoring the opening goal of the match in the 54th minute. Banel's third goal for Derby County, a 88th-minute winner in 3–2 win at Queens Park Rangers on 25 April 2026 won the Derby County goal of the season award. Banel scored three goals in 14 appearances during his loan spell at Derby County.

== Personal life ==
Born in the Netherlands, Banel is of Surinamese descent.

== International career ==
In September 2022 Banel played for the Dutch U19 team against Slovenia.

== Career statistics ==
As of match played 7 November 2026

Appearances and goals by club, season and competition
Club	Season	League			National Cup (Note: Includes FA Cup)		League Cup (Note: Includes EFL Cup)		Europe		Total	
Club	Season	Division	Apps	Goals	Apps	Goals	Apps	Goals	Apps	Goals	Apps	Goals
Jong Ajax	2021–22	Eerste Divisie	8	0	—		—		—		8	0
Jong Ajax	2022–23	Eerste Divisie	26	3	—		—		—		26	3
Jong Ajax	2023–24	Eerste Divisie	36	7	—		—		—		36	7
Jong Ajax	2024–25	Eerste Divisie	15	3	—		—		—		15	3
Jong Ajax	Total		85	13	—		—		—		85	13
Ajax	2022–23	Eredivisie	0	0	0	0	—		0	0	0	0
Ajax	2023–24	Eredivisie	5	0	0	0	—		1 (Note: Appearance(s) in UEFA Europa League)	0	6	0
Ajax	2024–25	Eredivisie	1	0	0	0	—		2	0	3	0
Ajax	Total		6	0	0	0	—		3	0	9	0
Burnley	2024–25	Championship	0	0	1	0	—		—		1	0
Burnley	2025–26	Premier League	1	0	1	1	2	0	—		4	1
Burnley	2026–27	Championship	3	0	0	0	0	0	—		3	0
Burnley	Total		4	0	2	1	2	0	—		8	1
Derby County (loan)	2025–26	Championship	14	3	—		—		—		14	3
Career total			109	16	2	1	2	0	3	0	116	17
