= Silvano Vos =

Dutch footballer (born 2005)

Personal information
- Full name: Silvano Cliff Robbie Vos
- Date of birth: 16 March 2005 (age 21)
- Place of birth: Amsterdam, Netherlands
- Height: 1.89 m (6 ft 2 in)
- Position: Midfielder

Team information
- Current team: AC Milan
- Number: 55

Youth career
- –2012: Zeeburgia
- 2012–2021: Ajax

Senior career*
Years	Team	Apps	(Gls)
2021–2024	Jong Ajax	57	(6)
2022–2024	Ajax	13	(0)
2024–	Milan Futuro	20	(2)
2024–	AC Milan	0	(0)

International career^{‡}
2020	Netherlands U15	2	(0)
2021–2022	Netherlands U17	15	(0)
2022	Netherlands U18	2	(0)
2023–2024	Netherlands U19	3	(0)
Medal record
Men's football
Representing Netherlands
UEFA European Under-17 Championship
Runner-up	2022 Israel
- * Club domestic league appearances and goals as of 22:45, 8 November 2026 (UTC) ‡ National team caps and goals as of 23 March 2024

Silvano Cliff Robbie Vos (born 16 March 2005) is a Dutch professional footballer who plays as a midfielder for Serie D club Milan Futuro, the reserve team of Serie A club AC Milan. He is a former Dutch youth international.

== Club career ==
=== Ajax ===
Starting the 2021–22 season as a regular with the Ajax youth team, most notably in the UEFA Youth League, Silvano Vos made his professional debut for Jong Ajax on 4 February 2022, replacing Youri Baas during a 2–1 home Eerste Divisie win against Jong AZ.

On 21 July 2023, Vos' contract with Ajax was extended to 2028.

On 21 September 2023, he made his professional debut with Ajax senior team at UEFA Europa League.

=== AC Milan ===
On 30 August 2024, Vos moved to Italy, and joined Serie A club AC Milan for a €3 million estimated fee on a five-year contract, he was assigned to the newly created reserve team Milan Futuro.

He made his debut with Milan Futuro on 1 September 2024, coming on as a substitute for Demirel Hodžić at the 46th minute, on a 1–1 home draw Serie C Group B match against Carpi.

Vos received his first call-up with AC Milan on 15 December 2024, as an unused substitute for a 0–0 home draw Serie A match against Genoa, simultaneously celebrating the club's 125th anniversary.

After missing out the whole 2025–26 season with Milan Futuro, he started during the 3–1 home loss first round Coppa Italia Serie D match against Sant'Angelo, on 29 August 2026. Eight days later he started with the team once again, and scored the third goal (his first with the club) during a 4–3 home win Serie D match against Caldiero Terme on the league's opening match for the 2026–27 season, on September 6th.

Vos was called-up with the AC Milan senior team by head coach Ruben Amorim on 25 October 2026 during the 2026–27 season, for the 2–0 away win Serie A match against Udinese, as an unused substitute however.

== Career statistics ==
=== Club ===
As of match played 8 November 2026

Appearances and goals by club, season and competition
Club	Season	League			National cup (Note: Includes KNVB Cup, Coppa Italia Serie C, Coppa Italia Serie D)		Europe		Other		Total	
Club	Season	Division	Apps	Goals	Apps	Goals	Apps	Goals	Apps	Goals	Apps	Goals
Jong Ajax	2021–22	Eerste Divisie	5	1	–		–		–		5	1
Jong Ajax	2022–23	Eerste Divisie	31	4	–		–		–		31	4
Jong Ajax	2023–24	Eerste Divisie	20	1	–		–		–		20	1
Jong Ajax	2024–25	Eerste Divisie	1	0	–		–		–		1	0
Jong Ajax	Total		57	6	–		–		–		57	6
Ajax	2022–23	Eredivisie	2	0	0	0	0	0	0	0	2	0
Ajax	2023–24	Eredivisie	11	0	0	0	3 (Note: Appearances in UEFA Europa League)	0	–		14	0
Ajax	Total		13	0	0	0	3	0	0	0	16	0
Milan Futuro	2024–25	Serie C	13	0	2	0	–		0	0	15	0
Milan Futuro	2026–27	Serie D	7	2	1	0	–		0	0	8	2
Milan Futuro	Total		20	2	3	0	–		0	0	23	2
AC Milan	2024–25	Serie A	0	0	0	0	–		0	0	0	0
AC Milan	2026–27	Serie A	0	0	0	0	0	0	0	0	0	0
AC Milan	Total		0	0	0	0	–		0	0	0	0
Career total			90	8	3	0	3	0	0	0	96	8

== Honours ==
AC Milan

- Supercoppa Italiana: 2024
