= Tommy Setford =

English footballer (born 2006)

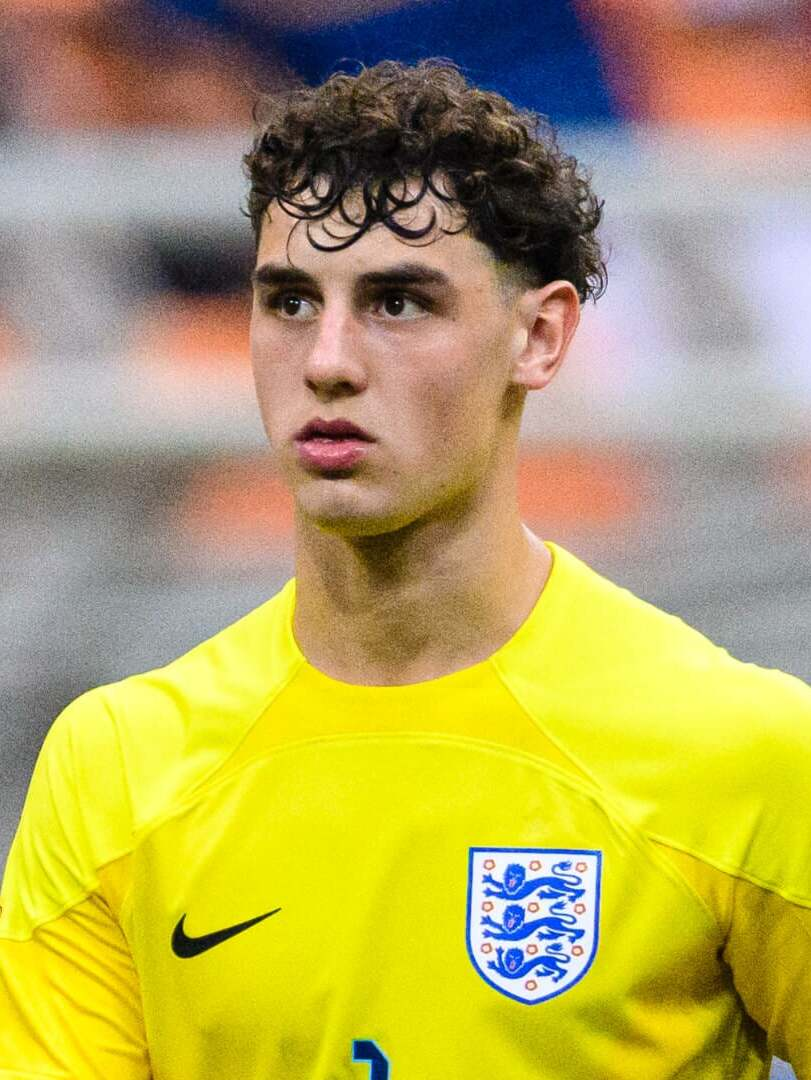
- Setford in 2024

Personal information
- Full name: Tommy Hogan Setford
- Date of birth: 13 March 2006 (age 20)
- Place of birth: Haarlem, Netherlands
- Height: 6 ft 1 in (1.85 m)
- Position: Goalkeeper

Team information
- Current team: Stevenage (on loan from Arsenal)
- Number: 1

Youth career
- 2021–2024: Ajax
- 2024–: Arsenal

Senior career*
Years	Team	Apps	(Gls)
2024–	Arsenal	0	(0)
2026–	→ Stevenage (loan)	5	(0)

International career^{‡}
2021	England U16	1	(0)
2021–2023	England U17	17	(0)
2023	England U18	4	(0)
2024–2025	England U19	10	(0)
2025–	England U20	1	(0)
2025–	England U21	4	(0)
- * Club domestic league appearances and goals as of 23:24, 19 October 2026 (UTC) ‡ National team caps and goals as of 23:24, 19 October 2026 (UTC)

Tommy Hogan Setford (born 13 March 2006) is a professional footballer who plays as a goalkeeper for EFL League One side Stevenage, on loan from Premier League club Arsenal. Born in the Netherlands, he represents England at youth international level.

Born in Haarlem, Setford began his youth career at Ajax, before transferring out to Arsenal's academy, Hale End, in July 2024, aged 18. He made his senior debut for the first team on 30 October 2024, in an EFL Cup match against Preston North End.

== Early life ==
Setford was born in 2006 in Haarlem, to an English professional golfer and a Dutch mother. He is the brother of MK Dons goalkeeper Charlie Setford.

== Club career ==
Setford was in the academy of Ajax before joining the academy at Arsenal in July 2024 for an undisclosed fee in the region of €1 million. He agreed a four-year contract with Arsenal with the option of an extra year.

Setford made his Arsenal debut on 30 October 2024, away to Preston North End in the Carabao Cup. He kept his first senior clean sheet for the Gunners in the 3–0 victory.

Setford came on as a substitute to make his FA Cup debut replacing Kepa in a 4–0 victory in the fourth round of the cup against Wigan Athletic on 15 February 2026.

Setford joined Stevenage on a season long loan deal from Arsenal on transfer deadline day, 1 September 2026.

== International career ==
Setford was a member of the England under-17 squad that finished fifth at the 2023 UEFA European Under-17 Championship. Later that year he was called up for the 2023 FIFA U-17 World Cup and started all four of their games at the tournament including their round of sixteen defeat against Uzbekistan.

In March 2024, Setford made his debut for the England under-19s against Morocco U19s. He was a member of the squad at the 2025 UEFA European Under-19 Championship and started all of their games at the tournament as England were eliminated at the group stage.

On 10 October 2025, Setford made his England U20 debut during a 1–0 defeat to Switzerland at St. George's Park. He has been described as "highly regarded at youth level and in the England setup too".

Setford made his England U21 debut on 14 November 2025 during a 2–0 win over the Republic of Ireland at St. Andrew's.

== Style of play ==
Setford operates as a goalkeeper. He has been described as "appreciated... for his sharp reflexes, technical skill, ability to play out from the back and his understanding of in-game tactics".

== Personal life ==
The son of Netherlands-based English professional golfer, Chris Setford, Tommy's older brother, Charlie Setford, also played for the Ajax youth teams as a goalkeeper, and also represented England U18s.

== Career statistics ==
As of match played 27 October 2026

Appearances and goals by club, season and competition
Club	Season	League			FA Cup		EFL Cup		Europe		Other		Total	
Club	Season	Division	Apps	Goals	Apps	Goals	Apps	Goals	Apps	Goals	Apps	Goals	Apps	Goals
Arsenal U21	2025–26	—			—		—		—		2 (Note: Appearances in EFL Trophy)	0	2	0
Arsenal U21	Total		—		—		—		—		2	0	2	0
Arsenal	2024–25	Premier League	0	0	0	0	1	0	0	0	—		1	0
Arsenal	2025–26	Premier League	0	0	1	0	0	0	0	0	—		1	0
Arsenal	Total		0	0	1	0	1	0	0	0	0	0	2	0
Stevenage	2026–27	League One	7	0	0	0	—		—		0	0	7	0
Career total			7	0	1	0	1	0	0	0	2	0	11	0

== Honours ==
Arsenal

- Premier League: 2025–26
