= Kristian Hlynsson =

Icelandic footballer (born 2004)

- Hlynsson in 2026 playing for Twente

Personal information
- Full name: Kristian Nökkvi Hlynsson
- Date of birth: 23 January 2004 (age 22)
- Place of birth: Odense, Denmark
- Height: 1.76 m (5 ft 9 in)
- Position: Midfielder

Team information
- Current team: Twente
- Number: 14

Youth career
- –2011: Þór
- 2011–2020: Breiðablik
- Norwich City
- 2020–2023: Ajax

Senior career*
Years	Team	Apps	(Gls)
2019	Breiðablik	1	(0)
2020–2023	Jong Ajax	87	(17)
2023–2025	Ajax	29	(8)
2025	→ Sparta Rotterdam (loan)	14	(2)
2025–	Twente	37	(10)

International career^{‡}
2018	Iceland U15	2	(2)
2019	Iceland U16	3	(0)
2019–2020	Iceland U17	10	(1)
2021–2023	Iceland U19	6	(1)
2021–2022	Iceland U21	10	(6)
2023–	Iceland	14	(2)
- * Club domestic league appearances and goals as of 18 October 2026 ‡ National team caps and goals as of 16 November 2026

Kristian Nökkvi Hlynsson (born 23 January 2004) is an Icelandic professional footballer who plays as a midfielder for Eredivisie club Twente and the Iceland national team.

== Club career ==
Kristian started his career with Icelandic club Breiðablik, making his senior debut in the Besta deild karla in 2019. During his youth career, Hlynsson also spent time training with English club Norwich City. In January 2020, he transferred to the youth academy of Ajax.

=== Ajax ===
Hlynsson made his professional debut for Jong Ajax in the Eerste Divisie on 7 December 2020 against FC Eindhoven. He gradually established himself as a key player for the reserve team, particularly during the 2022–23 season where he scored 11 goals in 37 league appearances from midfield. His first goals for the senior Ajax team came on 15 December 2021, when he scored twice after coming on as a substitute in a KNVB Cup match against BVV Barendrecht.

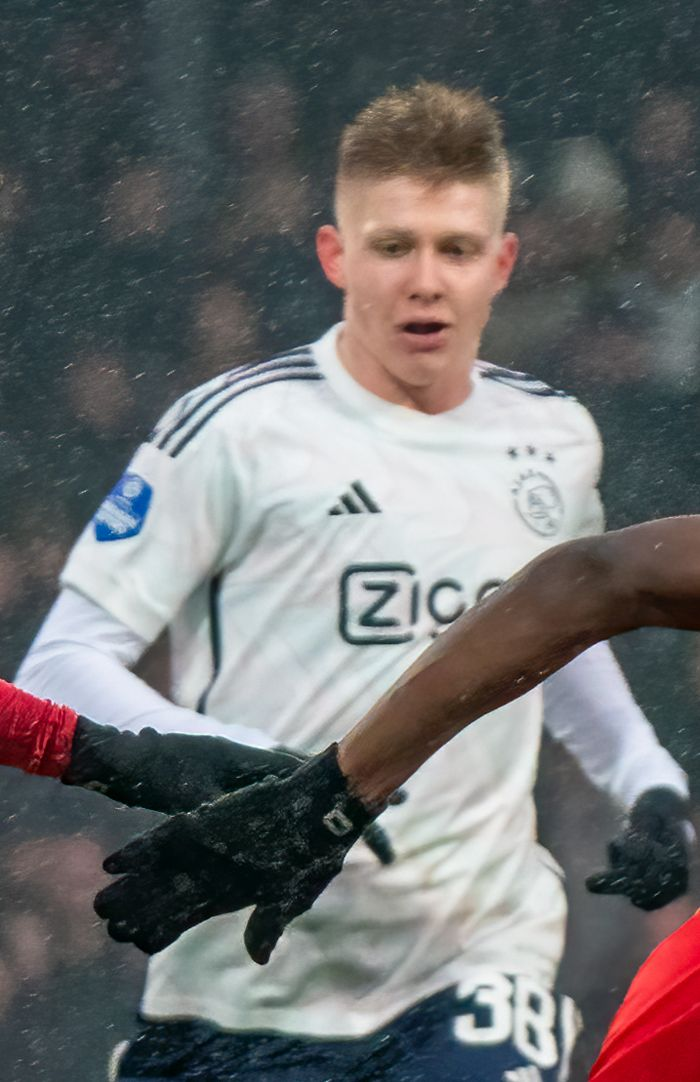
Hlynsson playing for Ajax

Hlynsson made his Eredivisie debut for Ajax on 19 August 2023 in a 2–2 draw against Excelsior. He enjoyed a breakthrough during the 2023–24 season, becoming a regular starter in attacking midfield under managers Maurice Steijn and John van 't Schip. He scored 7 goals in 25 Eredivisie appearances and featured in the UEFA Europa League and UEFA Europa Conference League. His performances earned him the Eredivisie Talent of the Month award for January 2024. However, in the first half of the 2024–25 season, his first-team opportunities became more limited.

==== Loan to Sparta Rotterdam ====
On 31 January 2025, seeking more consistent playing time, Hlynsson joined fellow Eredivisie club Sparta Rotterdam on loan until the end of the 2024–25 season. He quickly integrated into the team, scoring his first goal for Sparta in a league match against Willem II on 2 March 2025.

=== FC Twente ===
On 8 July 2025 Ajax and FC Twente reached an agreement regarding the transfer of Kristian Hlynsson to the club from Enschede.

== International career ==
Hlynsson has featured for the under-15, under-16, under-17, under-19 and under-21 Icelandic youth national teams. He made his senior debut for the Iceland national team on 16 November 2023, appearing as a substitute against Slovakia in a UEFA Euro 2024 qualifying match. He earned his second cap in a friendly against the Netherlands on 10 June 2024. His third appearance came on 23 March 2025, again as a substitute, in a UEFA Nations League play-off match against Kosovo.

== Personal life ==
Kristian is the younger brother of Vestri player Ágúst Hlynsson.

== Career statistics ==
=== Club ===
As of match played 22 October 2026

Appearances and goals by club, season and competition
Club	Season	League			National cup (Note: Includes KNVB Cup)		Europe		Other		Total	
Club	Season	Division	Apps	Goals	Apps	Goals	Apps	Goals	Apps	Goals	Apps	Goals
Breiðablik	2019	Besta deild karla	1	0	—		—		—		1	0
Jong Ajax	2020–21	Eerste Divisie	6	0	—		—		—		6	0
Jong Ajax	2021–22	Eerste Divisie	30	2	—		—		—		30	2
Jong Ajax	2022–23	Eerste Divisie	37	11	—		—		—		37	11
Jong Ajax	2023–24	Eerste Divisie	7	3	—		—		—		7	3
Jong Ajax	2024–25	Eerste Divisie	4	1	—		—		—		4	1
Jong Ajax	Total		85	17	—		—		—		85	17
Ajax	2021–22	Eredivisie	0	0	2	2	0	0	0	0	2	2
Ajax	2023–24	Eredivisie	25	7	1	0	7 (Note: Three appearances in UEFA Europa League, four appearances in UEFA Conference League)	0	—		33	7
Ajax	2024–25	Eredivisie	4	1	1	0	3 (Note: Appearances in UEFA Europa League)	0	—		8	1
Ajax	2025–26	Eredivisie	0	0	0	0	0	0	0	0	0	0
Ajax	Total		29	8	4	2	10	0	0	0	43	10
Sparta Rotterdam	2024–25	Eredivisie	14	2	—		—		—		14	2
Twente	2025–26	Eredivisie	33	10	4	2	—		—		37	12
Twente	2026–27	Eredivisie	4	0	0	0	7 (Note: Two appearances in UEFA Europa League, five appearances in UEFA Conference League)	0	—		11	0
Twente	Total		37	10	4	2	7	0	—		48	12
Career total			166	37	8	4	17	0	0	0	191	41

=== International ===
As of match played 16 November 2026

Appearances and goals by national team and year
National team	Year	Apps	Goals
Iceland	2023	1	0
Iceland	2024	1	0
Iceland	2025	7	2
Iceland	2026	5	0
Total		14	2

Scores and results list Iceland's goal tally first, score column indicates score after each Kristian goal.

List of international goals scored by Kristian Hlynsson
No.	Date	Venue	Cap	Opponent	Score	Result	Competition
1	5 September 2025	Laugardalsvöllur, Reykjavík, Iceland	5	Azerbaijan	5–0	5–0	2026 FIFA World Cup qualification
2	13 October 2025	Laugardalsvöllur, Reykjavík, Iceland	8	France	2–2	2–2	2026 FIFA World Cup qualification
