= List of Dutch football transfers winter 2022–23 =

List of Dutch football transfers for the 2022–23 winter transfer window

This is a list of Dutch football transfers for the 2022–23 winter transfer window. Only transfers featuring Eredivisie are listed.

== Eredivisie ==
Note: Flags indicate national team as has been defined under FIFA eligibility rules. Players may hold more than one non-FIFA nationality.

=== Ajax ===
In:

No.	Pos.	Nation	Player
12	GK	ARG	Gerónimo Rulli (from (Spain) Villarreal)

Out:

No.	Pos.	Nation	Player
11	FW	ARG	Lucas Ocampos (loan return to (Spain) Sevilla)
16	GK	NED	Jay Gorter (on loan to (Scotland) Aberdeen)
17	DF	NED	Daley Blind (to (Germany) Bayern Munich)
27	MF	NED	Mohamed Ihattaren (loan return to (Italy) Juventus)
29	DF	ARG	Lisandro Magallán (to (Spain) Elche)
39	DF	NED	Kik Pierie (on loan to Excelsior)

=== PSV ===
In:

No.	Pos.	Nation	Player
10	FW	POR	Fábio Silva (on loan from (England) Wolverhampton Wanderers, previously on loan at (Belgium) Anderlecht)
11	MF	BEL	Thorgan Hazard (on loan from (Germany) Borussia Dortmund)
30	DF	NED	Patrick van Aanholt (on loan from (Turkey) Galatasaray)

Out:

No.	Pos.	Nation	Player
2	DF	NED	Ki-Jana Hoever (loan return to (England) Wolverhampton Wanderers)
8	MF	NED	Marco van Ginkel (to Vitesse)
10	FW	ENG	Noni Madueke (to (England) Chelsea)
11	FW	NED	Cody Gakpo (to (England) Liverpool)
31	DF	GER	Philipp Max (on loan to (Germany) Eintracht Frankfurt)
32	FW	BEL	Yorbe Vertessen (on loan to (Belgium) Union Saint-Gilloise)
35	DF	NOR	Fredrik Oppegård (on loan to Go Ahead Eagles)
37	MF	USA	Richard Ledezma (on loan to (United States) New York City)
—	FW	POR	Bruma (to (Turkey) Fenerbahçe, previously on loan)

=== Feyenoord ===
In:

No.	Pos.	Nation	Player
28	DF	NED	Neraysho Kasanwirjo (from Groningen)

Out:

No.	Pos.	Nation	Player
5	DF	NOR	Fredrik André Bjørkan (loan return to (Germany) Hertha BSC)
27	MF	NED	Noah Naujoks (to Excelsior)

=== Twente ===
In:

No.	Pos.	Nation	Player
12	DF	ISL	Alfons Sampsted (from (Norway) Bodø/Glimt)

Out:

No.	Pos.	Nation	Player
19	FW	GRE	Christos Tzolis (loan return to (England) Norwich City)
24	DF	NED	Luca Everink (free agent)
32	MF	NED	Casper Staring (to NAC Breda)
37	MF	NED	Thijs van Leeuwen (to TOP Oss)

=== AZ ===
In:

No.	Pos.	Nation	Player
1	GK	AUS	Mathew Ryan (from (Denmark) Copenhagen)
16	MF	NED	Sven Mijnans (from Sparta Rotterdam)
30	MF	USA	Djordje Mihailovic (from (Canada) Montréal)

Out:

No.	Pos.	Nation	Player
1	GK	DEN	Peter Vindahl Jensen (on loan to (Germany) 1. FC Nürnberg)
14	MF	NED	Peer Koopmeiners (on loan to Excelsior)
18	MF	NOR	Håkon Evjen (to (Denmark) Brøndby)

=== Vitesse ===
In:

No.	Pos.	Nation	Player
15	MF	NED	Marco van Ginkel (from PSV)
19	MF	NED	Davy Pröpper (free agent)
29	DF	FRA	Nicolas Isimat-Mirin (from (United States) Sporting Kansas City)

Out:

No.	Pos.	Nation	Player
11	FW	DEN	Nikolai Baden Frederiksen (on loan to (Hungary) Ferencváros)
29	FW	NED	Thomas Buitink (on loan to Fortuna Sittard)

=== Utrecht ===
In:

No.	Pos.	Nation	Player
7	MF	DEN	Victor Jensen (from Jong Ajax, previously on loan at (Norway) Rosenborg)
19	FW	BEL	Anthony Descotte (on loan from (Belgium) Charleroi)
20	MF	MAR	Zakaria Labyad (free agent)

Out:

No.	Pos.	Nation	Player
7	FW	NED	Daishawn Redan (loan return to (Germany) Hertha BSC)
11	FW	MAR	Mimoun Mahi (on loan to Cambuur)
15	DF	NED	Djevencio van der Kust (on loan to (United States) Houston Dynamo)
20	DF	FRA	Arthur Zagré (loan return to (France) Monaco)
29	FW	FRA	Moussa Sylla (to (France) Caen)

=== Heerenveen ===
In:

No.	Pos.	Nation	Player
9	FW	NOR	Daniel Karlsbakk (from (Norway) Viking)
11	MF	NED	Pelle van Amersfoort (free agent)
20	MF	NOR	Osame Sahraoui (from (Norway) Vålerenga)
24	FW	NED	Ché Nunnely (free agent)
25	DF	NED	Jeffrey Bruma (from (Turkey) Kasımpaşa)

Out:

No.	Pos.	Nation	Player
9	FW	SWE	Amin Sarr (to (France) Lyon)
—	DF	URU	Joaquín Fernández (to (Uruguay) Boston River, previously on loan at (Uruguay) Atenas)

=== Cambuur ===
In:

No.	Pos.	Nation	Player
9	FW	NOR	Bjørn Johnsen (from (Canada) Montréal)
17	MF	NED	Ben Rienstra (free agent)
19	MF	NED	Navarone Foor (from (Latvia) Riga)
25	FW	MAR	Mimoun Mahi (on loan from Utrecht)

Out:

No.	Pos.	Nation	Player
2	DF	NED	Jasper ter Heide (free agent)
9	FW	NED	Tom Boere (to NAC Breda)

=== RKC Waalwijk ===
In:

No.	Pos.	Nation	Player
20	MF	NED	Mats Seuntjens (from Fortuna Sittard)
37	MF	BEL	Chris Lokesa (from (Belgium) RSCA Futures)

Out:

No.	Pos.	Nation	Player

=== NEC ===
In:

No.	Pos.	Nation	Player
77	FW	NED	Anthony Musaba (on loan from (France) Monaco, previously on loan at (France) Metz)

Out:

No.	Pos.	Nation	Player
10	MF	DEN	Mikkel Duelund (loan return to (Ukraine) Dynamo Kyiv)

=== Groningen ===
In:

No.	Pos.	Nation	Player
8	MF	NOR	Johan Hove (from (Norway) Strømsgodset)
15	DF	NED	Jetro Willems (free agent)
21	FW	FIN	Oliver Antman (on loan from (Denmark) Nordsjælland)
28	FW	NED	Elvis Manu (on loan from (Bulgaria) Botev Plovdiv)
29	DF	DEN	Mads Bech Sørensen (on loan from (England) Brentford, previously on loan at (France) Nice)
31	MF	SWE	Aimar Sher (on loan from (Italy) Spezia)
37	DF	CZE	Matěj Chaluš (on loan from (Sweden) Malmö)

Out:

No.	Pos.	Nation	Player
3	DF	CRO	Marin Šverko (on loan to (Italy) Venezia)
5	DF	NED	Mike te Wierik (to Emmen)
15	DF	SWE	Yahya Kalley (on loan to (Sweden) Norrköping)
16	GK	NED	Jan Hoekstra (on loan to PEC Zwolle)
21	DF	NED	Neraysho Kasanwirjo (to Feyenoord)
22	MF	SWE	Ramon Pascal Lundqvist (to (Norway) Sarpsborg 08)
27	FW	BEL	Cyril Ngonge (to (Italy) Hellas Verona)

=== Go Ahead Eagles ===
In:

No.	Pos.	Nation	Player
17	FW	ESP	Darío Serra (on loan from (Spain) Valencia B)
26	DF	NOR	Fredrik Oppegård (on loan from PSV)

Out:

No.	Pos.	Nation	Player
15	MF	SWE	Tesfaldet Tekie (to (Sweden) Hammarby)
17	FW	NED	Martijn Berden (on loan to VVV-Venlo)
26	DF	NED	Justin Bakker (to (Finland) KuPS)

=== Sparta Rotterdam ===
In:

No.	Pos.	Nation	Player
—	MF	ESP	Pedro Alemañ (from (Spain) Valencia B)
—	FW	NOR	Elias Melkersen (on loan from (Scotland) Hibernian)
—	DF	NED	Rick Meissen (from Jong Utrecht)

Out:

No.	Pos.	Nation	Player
—	MF	NED	Sven Mijnans (to AZ)
—	FW	GER	Mario Engels (to (Japan) Tokyo Verdy)
—	FW	COD	Jason Lokilo (on loan to (Turkey) İstanbulspor)

=== Fortuna Sittard ===
In:

No.	Pos.	Nation	Player
8	MF	CRO	Kristijan Bistrović (on loan from (Russia) CSKA Moscow, previously on loan at (Italy) Lecce)
29	FW	NED	Thomas Buitink (on loan from Vitesse)
55	DF	CRO	Stipe Radić (free agent)
74	FW	ITA	Gianmarco Cangiano (on loan from (Italy) Bologna, previously on loan at (Italy) Bari)

Out:

No.	Pos.	Nation	Player
3	MF	GRE	Vasilios Sourlis (loan return to (Greece) Olympiacos)
8	MF	USA	Cole Bassett (loan return to (United States) Colorado Rapids)
10	MF	NED	Mats Seuntjens (to RKC Waalwijk)

=== Emmen ===
In:

No.	Pos.	Nation	Player
14	DF	NED	Dennis Vos (from Jong PSV)
17	DF	NED	Mike te Wierik (from Groningen)
21	FW	NED	Danny Hoesen (free agent)
28	FW	ALG	Oussama Darfalou (from (Morocco) Maghreb de Fès)
57	FW	CUW	Jeremy Antonisse (on loan from Jong PSV)

Out:

No.	Pos.	Nation	Player
12	MF	NED	Remi van Ekeris (to Lisse)
15	FW	PER	Gonzalo Sánchez (free agent)
17	FW	PER	Fernando Pacheco (loan return to (Peru) Sporting Cristal)

=== Volendam ===
In:

No.	Pos.	Nation	Player
12	MF	FRA	Florent Da Silva (on loan from (France) Lyon)

Out:

No.	Pos.	Nation	Player

=== Excelsior ===
In:

No.	Pos.	Nation	Player
3	DF	NED	Kik Pierie (on loan from Ajax)
12	DF	FRA	Arthur Zagré (on loan from (France) Monaco, previously on loan at FC Utrecht)
15	MF	NED	Noah Naujoks (from Feyenoord)
23	MF	NED	Peer Koopmeiners (on loan from AZ)
27	FW	NED	Vicente Besuijen (on loan from (Scotland) Aberdeen)

Out:

No.	Pos.	Nation	Player

== See also ==
- 2022–23 Eredivisie
