= Olivier Aertssen =

Dutch footballer (born 2004)

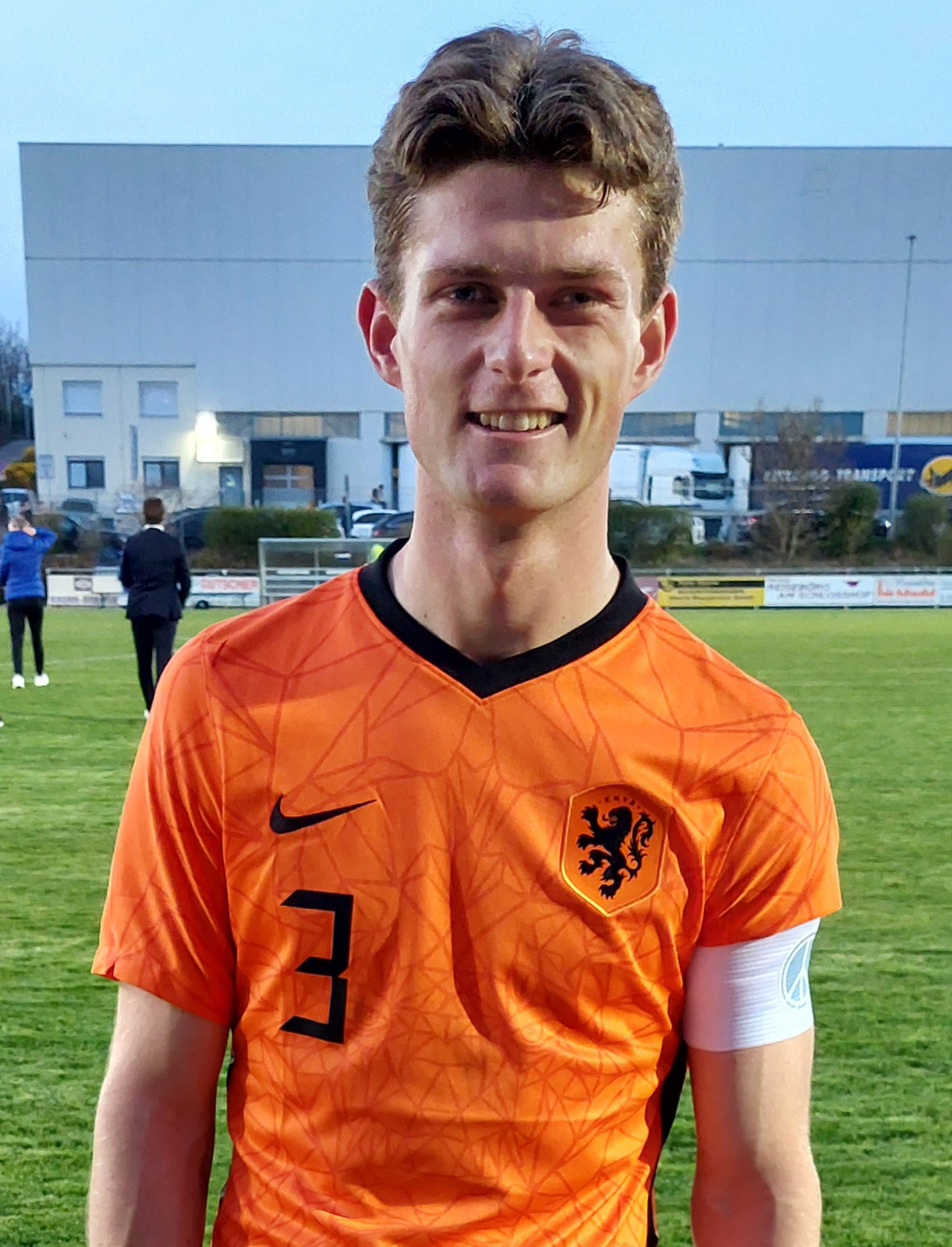

Personal information
- Date of birth: 7 August 2004 (age 22)
- Place of birth: Veldhoven, Netherlands
- Height: 1.83 m (6 ft 0 in)
- Position: Centre-back

Team information
- Current team: PEC Zwolle
- Number: 3

Youth career
- Oirschot Vooruit
- –2017: VV Wolphaartsdijk
- 2017–2018: VV Kloetinge
- 2018–2019: Sparta Rotterdam
- 2019–2021: Ajax

Senior career*
Years	Team	Apps	(Gls)
2021–2024	Jong Ajax	63	(1)
2023–2024	Ajax	0	(0)
2024–	PEC Zwolle	48	(1)

International career^{‡}
2022	Netherlands U18	1	(0)
2022	Netherlands U19	1	(0)
- * Club domestic league appearances and goals as of 21 May 2026 ‡ National team caps and goals as of 03:51, 10 January 2023 (UTC)

Olivier Aertssen (born 7 August 2004) is a Dutch professional footballer who plays as a centre-back for Eredivisie club PEC Zwolle.

== Club career ==
Olivier Aertssen started his footballing career in amateur teams between Oirschot, Wolphaartsdijk and Kloetinge, before joining Sparta Rotterdam in 2018 and the Ajax Youth Academy a year later, as they had a partnership with the club from Rotterdam.

Starting the 2021–22 season as a regular with the Ajax youth team, most notably in the UEFA Youth League, Aertssen made his professional debut for Jong Ajax on the 10 January 2022, starting the 2–0 away Eerste Divisie win against Jong Utrecht as a center-back. By doing so he became the fourth youngest professional footballer from the province of Zeeland, just behind John Karelse, Erwin Nuytinck and Rick van Drongelen.

Aertssen was called up to Ajax senior squad regularly in the 2022–23 and 2023–24 seasons, his only competitive appearance for the team was on 11 January 2023 in a KNVB Cup game against Den Bosch.

On 26 August 2024, Aertssen signed a three-season contract with PEC Zwolle.

== Career statistics ==
As of match played 16 February 2024

Appearances and goals by club, season and competition
Club	Season	League			Cup		Europe		Other		Total	
Club	Season	Division	Apps	Goals	Apps	Goals	Apps	Goals	Apps	Goals	Apps	Goals
Jong Ajax	2021–22	Eerste Divisie	4	0	—		—		—		4	0
Jong Ajax	2022–23	Eerste Divisie	36	1	—		—		—		36	1
Jong Ajax	2023–24	Eerste Divisie	23	0	—		—		—		23	0
Jong Ajax	Total		63	1	—		—		—		63	1
Ajax Amsterdam	2022–23	Eredivisie	0	0	1	0	0	0	0	0	1	0
Ajax Amsterdam	2023–24	Eredivisie	0	0	0	0	0	0	—		0	0
Ajax Amsterdam	Total		0	0	1	0	0	0	0	0	0	0
Career total			63	1	1	0	0	0	0	0	64	1
