= Gabriel Misehouy =

Dutch footballer (born 2005)

Personal information
- Full name: Gabriel Osei Misehouy
- Date of birth: 18 July 2005 (age 21)
- Place of birth: Amsterdam, Netherlands
- Height: 1.72 m (5 ft 8 in)
- Position: Attacking midfielder

Team information
- Current team: NAC Breda (on loan from Girona)

Youth career
- OSV
- 2012–2022: Ajax

Senior career*
| Years | Team | Apps | (Gls) |
| 2022–2024 | Jong Ajax | 44 | (10) |
| 2024– | Girona | 9 | (1) |
| 2025–2026 | → Aris (loan) | 9 | (1) |
| 2026– | → NAC Breda (loan) | 0 | (0) |

International career^{‡}
| 2019–2020 | Netherlands U16 | 3 | (2) |
| 2021 | Netherlands U17 | 8 | (2) |
| 2023 | Netherlands U19 | 1 | (0) |
Medal record
Men's football
Representing Netherlands
UEFA European Under-17 Championship
| Runner-up | 2022 |
- * Club domestic league appearances and goals as of 31 January 2026 ‡ National team caps and goals as of 11 September 2023

Gabriel Osei Misehouy (born 18 July 2005) is a Dutch professional footballer who plays as an attacking midfielder for NAC Breda, on loan from Segunda División club Girona.

== Career ==
=== Ajax ===
A youth product of OSV and Ajax, Misehouy worked his way up Ajax's reserves and was their U17 captain. He signed his first professional contract with Ajax in September 2021. He made his professional debut with Jong Ajax in a 3–1 Eerste Divisie loss to Almere City on 21 February 2022 coming on as a sub in the 79th minute.

=== Girona ===
On 10 July 2024, La Liga side Girona announced the signing of Misehouy on a four-year contract. On his debut on 15 August against Real Betis, Misehouy scored in the 72nd minute, salvaging a draw for his team.

On 21 July 2025, Misehouy was loaned to Super League Greece side Aris, for one year. On 31 August of the following year, he returned to the Netherlands after agreeing to a one-year loan deal with NAC Breda.

== Personal life ==
Born in the Netherlands, Misehouy is of Ghanaian descent. He is a youth international for the Netherlands.

== Career statistics ==
As of match played 30 March 2025.

Appearances and goals by club, season and competition
| Club | Season | League | | | Cup | | Europe | | Other | | Total | |
| Club | Season | Division | Apps | Goals | Apps | Goals | Apps | Goals | Apps | Goals | Apps | Goals |
|---|---|---|---|---|---|---|---|---|---|---|---|---|
| Jong Ajax | 2021–22 | Eerste Divisie | 4 | 0 | – | | – | | – | | 4 | 0 |
| Jong Ajax | 2022–23 | Eerste Divisie | 27 | 4 | – | | – | | – | | 27 | 4 |
| Jong Ajax | 2023–24 | Eerste Divisie | 13 | 6 | – | | – | | – | | 13 | 6 |
| Jong Ajax | Total | | 44 | 10 | – | | – | | – | | 44 | 10 |
| Girona FC | 2024–25 | La Liga | 9 | 1 | 2 | 0 | 0 | 0 | – | | 11 | 1 |
| Career total | | | 53 | 11 | 2 | 0 | 0 | 0 | 0 | 0 | 55 | 11 |
