= Ömer Gündüz =

Dutch footballer

Personal information
- Full name: Ömer Mert Gündüz
- Date of birth: 24 April 2001 (age 25)
- Place of birth: Maassluis, Netherlands
- Height: 1.76 m (5 ft 9 in)
- Position: Midfielder

Team information
- Current team: Mazıdağı Fosfatspor

Youth career
- 2011–2012: Excelsior Maassluis
- 2012–2020: Feyenoord

Senior career*
Years	Team	Apps	(Gls)
2020–2022	Feyenoord	0	(0)
2022–2023	TOP Oss	33	(0)
2023–2025	Fethiyespor	33	(0)
2025-2026	Yozgat Beledıyesı Bozokspor	32	(0)
2026-	Mazıdağı Fosfatspor	1	(0)
- * Club domestic league appearances and goals as of 10:28, 30 December 2025 (UTC)

Ömer Mert Gündüz (born 24 April 2001) is a Dutch professional footballer who plays as a midfielder for Turkish club Mazıdağı Fosfatspor.

== Career ==
=== Feyenoord ===
From Maassluis, in South Holland, in 2012 he made the switch from Excelsior Maassluis to join the football academy at Feyenoord. He moved through the age group teams and signed his first professional contract with Feyenoord in June 2020. Shortly afterward he suffered a severe knee injury that curtailed his season very early. He had successful surgery on the cruciate ligament in his knee in October 2020 and began a period of rehabilitation. In March 2021 he signed a contract extension with Feyenoord, with Feyenoord technical director Frank Arnesen commenting that between the COVID-19 pandemic and the knee injury he had not been given a chance to prove himself.

=== TOP Oss ===
In August 2022 Gündüz agreed a free transfer to TOP Oss following a short trial. He made his professional debut on 5 September 2022 for TOP Oss in the Eerste Divisie against Jong PSV.

=== Fethiyespor ===
On 25 August 2023, Gündüz joined Fethiyespor in the Turkish third-tier TFF Second League on a two-year contract.

=== Yozgatspor ===
In 2025, he joined Turkish club Yozgatspor, in the TFF 3. Lig.

== Personal life ==
Born in the Netherlands, Gündüz is of Turkish descent.
