= Tijmen Wildeboer =

Dutch footballer (born 2001)

Personal information
- Date of birth: 13 December 2001 (age 24)
- Place of birth: Haarlem, Netherlands
- Height: 1.89 m (6 ft 2 in)
- Position: Forward

Team information
- Current team: Spartak Trnava
- Number: 14

Youth career
- –2018: BVC Bloemendaal
- 2018–2020: AZ

Senior career*
Years	Team	Apps	(Gls)
2020–2021	Jong AZ	4	(0)
2021–2024	Almere City	21	(4)
2023–2024	Jong Almere City	29	(15)
2024–2026	TOP Oss	59	(11)
2026–	Spartak Trnava	10	(1)
- * Club domestic league appearances and goals as of 21 November 2026

Tijmen Wildeboer (born 13 December 2001) is a Dutch professional footballer who plays as a forward for Slovak club FC Spartak Trnava.

== Club career ==
Wildeboer made his professional debut with Jong AZ in a 3–2 Eerste Divisie loss to Jong Ajax on 16 October 2020.

On 11 June 2024, Wildeboer signed a two-year contract with an option for an additional year with Eerste Divisie club TOP Oss.
