= Giovanni (footballer, born 2002) =

Brazilian footballer

Personal information
- Full name: Giovanni Manson Ribeiro
- Date of birth: 31 January 2002 (age 24)
- Place of birth: Bauru, Brazil
- Height: 1.76 m (5 ft 9 in)
- Position: Attacking midfielder

Team information
- Current team: Ballkani
- Number: 37

Youth career
- 2012–2019: Santos
- 2020: Ajax

Senior career*
Years	Team	Apps	(Gls)
2020–2023	Jong Ajax	36	(3)
2022	→ Telstar (loan)	15	(2)
2023	Fluminense	13	(0)
2024	Amazonas	2	(1)
2024–	Ballkani	71	(16)

International career^{‡}
2017	Brazil U16	3	(3)
- * Club domestic league appearances and goals as of 30 October 2026 ‡ National team caps and goals as of 11:44, 30 August 2020 (UTC)

Giovanni Manson Ribeiro (born 31 January 2002), simply known as Giovanni, is a Brazilian footballer who plays as an attacking midfielder for Kosovan club Ballkani.

== Club career ==
=== Early career ===
Born in Bauru, São Paulo, Giovanni joined Santos FC's youth setup in 2012, aged ten. After failing to agree on terms to a new contract, he left the club in May 2019, as his youth deal expired, and was subsequently linked to moves to Chelsea and AFC Ajax.

=== Ajax ===
On 25 February 2020, Ajax requested FIFA to intervene for the club on the transfer of Giovanni, who was at the time blocked by Santos. On 4 March, after being given the clearance, he was announced by the club on a four-year contract, being initially assigned to the reserve team.

Giovanni made his senior debut for Jong Ajax on 30 August 2020, starting in a 4–0 away loss against Roda JC. On 11 September he scored his first senior goal, netting his team's only in a 2–1 loss at NEC Nijmegen.

==== Loan to Telstar ====
On 18 January 2022, Giovanni was loaned out to Telstar until the end of the season. Coincidentally, he made his debut for the club against Jong Ajax on 23 January in a 1–0 home win.

=== Fluminense ===
On 2 January 2023, Giovanni signed with Fluminense on a one-year contract, with an option to extend for 2024. He was regularly used during the 2023 Campeonato Carioca, and made his Série A debut on 13 May of that year, in a 2–0 home win over Cuiabá.

On 29 December 2023, Giovanni left Flu; he also won the 2023 Copa Libertadores with the club, but did not feature in the competition.

=== Amazonas ===
On 3 March 2024, Giovanni signed for Série B newcomers Amazonas. However, he only featured in three matches before leaving in July.

=== Ballkani ===
Shortly after leaving Amazonas, Giovanni moved to Kosovo after agreeing to a deal with FC Ballkani.

== Career statistics ==
As of 31 December 2024

Appearances and goals by club, season and competition
Club	Season	League			State league (Note: Includes Campeonato Carioca, Campeonato Amazonense)		Cup (Note: Includes KNVB Cup, Copa do Brasil)		Continental		Other		Total	
Club	Season	Division	Apps	Goals	Apps	Goals	Apps	Goals	Apps	Goals	Apps	Goals	Apps	Goals
Jong Ajax	2020–21	Eerste Divisie	23	2	—		—		—		—		23	2
Jong Ajax	2021–22	Eerste Divisie	8	0	—		—		—		—		8	0
Jong Ajax	2022–23	Eerste Divisie	5	1	—		—		—		—		5	1
Jong Ajax	Total		36	3	0	0	0	0	0	0	0	0	36	3
Telstar (loan)	2021–22	Eerste Divisie	15	2	—		1	0	—		—		16	2
Fluminense	2023	Série A	5	0	8	0	1	0	0	0	—		14	0
Amazonas	2024	Série B	0	0	2	1	0	0	—		1 (Note: Appearance(s) in Copa Verde)	0	3	1
Ballkani	2024–25	Superleague of Kosovo	15	5	—		0	0	3 (Note: Appearance(s) in UEFA Conference League)	0	—		18	5
Career total			71	10	10	1	2	0	3	0	1	0	87	11

== Honours ==
Fluminense

- Taça Guanabara: 2023
- Campeonato Carioca: 2023
- Copa Libertadores: 2023
