= Patrickson Delgado =

Ecuadorian footballer (born 2003)

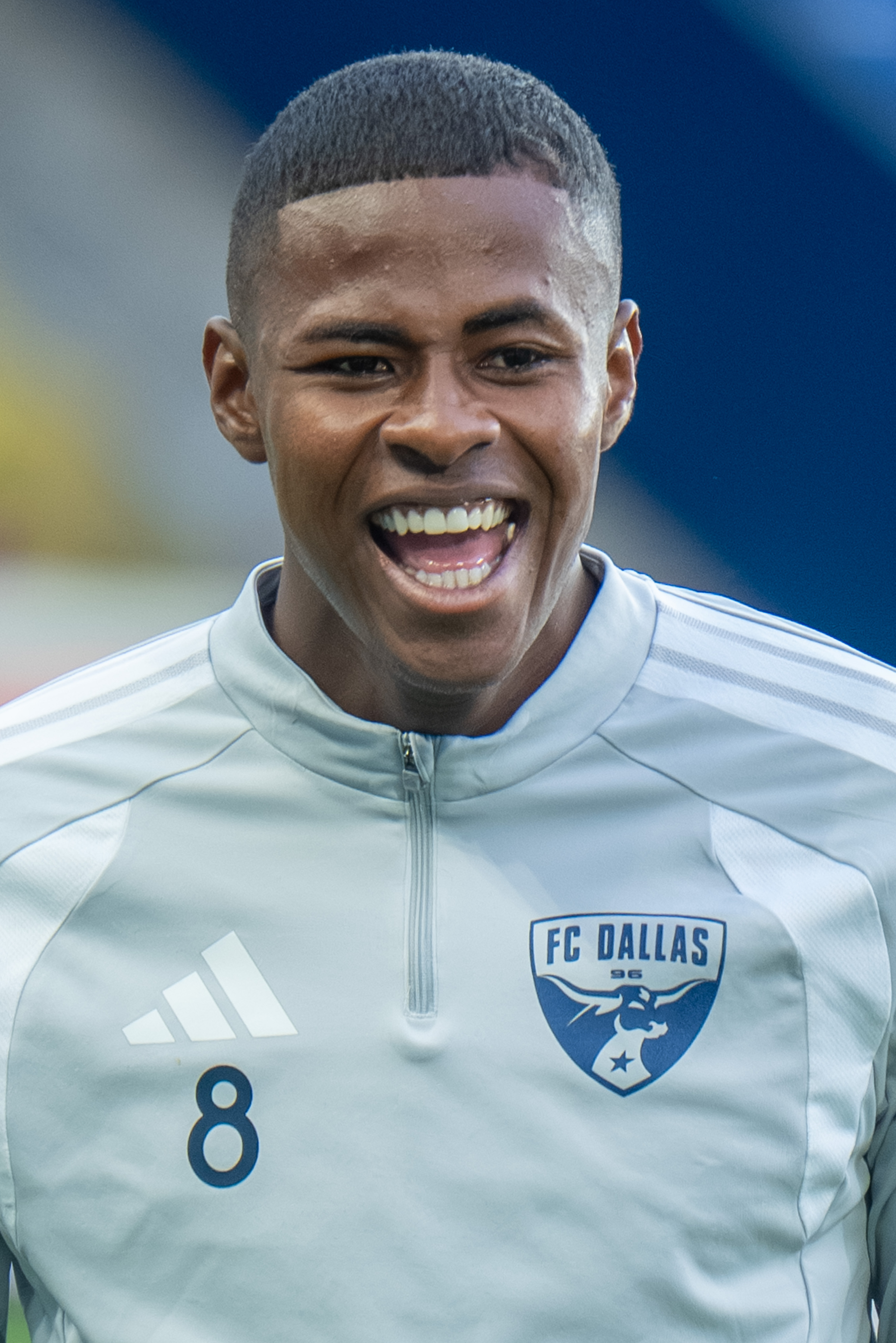
- Delgado with FC Dallas in 2026

Personal information
- Full name: Patrickson Luiggy Delgado Villa
- Date of birth: 17 October 2003 (age 23)
- Place of birth: Ibarra, Ecuador
- Height: 1.77 m (5 ft 10 in)
- Position: Midfielder

Team information
- Current team: FC Dallas
- Number: 8

Youth career
- Independiente del Valle

Senior career*
Years	Team	Apps	(Gls)
2021	Independiente Juniors	41	(5)
2022–2025	Independiente del Valle	6	(0)
2022–2023	→ Jong Ajax (loan)	24	(0)
2024–2025	→ FC Dallas (loan)	23	(4)
2025–	FC Dallas	37	(2)

International career
2023–	Ecuador U20	9	(0)
- * Club domestic league appearances and goals as of 06:09, 18 March 2024 (UTC)

Patrickson Luiggy Delgado Villa (born 17 October 2003) is an Ecuadorian footballer who plays as a midfielder for MLS side FC Dallas.

== Career ==
=== Club career ===
Before the second half of 2021–22, Delgado was sent on loan to Dutch side Jong Ajax. On 11 March 2022, he debuted for Jong Ajax during a 3–3 draw with FC Dordrecht.

On 25 January 2024, Delgado joined Major League Soccer side FC Dallas on a season-long loan.

=== International career ===
He represented Ecuador at the 2019 FIFA U-17 World Cup.
