= Donny Warmerdam =

Dutch footballer (born 2002)

Personal information
- Date of birth: 2 January 2002 (age 24)
- Place of birth: Sassenheim, Netherlands
- Height: 1.74 m (5 ft 9 in)
- Position: Defensive midfielder

Team information
- Current team: De Graafschap
- Number: 8

Youth career
- RKVV Teylingen
- 2010–2021: Ajax

Senior career*
Years	Team	Apps	(Gls)
2020–2023	Jong Ajax	82	(5)
2023–2025	De Graafschap	77	(9)
2025–2026	PSIM Yogyakarta	11	(0)
2026–	De Graafschap	7	(2)

International career
2018	Netherlands U16	5	(0)
- * Club domestic league appearances and goals as of 18:33, 21 September 2026 (UTC)

Donny Warmerdam (born 2 January 2002) is a Dutch professional footballer who plays as a defensive midfielder for Eerste Divisie club De Graafschap.

== Club career ==
=== Ajax ===
Warmerdam played youth football for RKVV Teylingen and Ajax. He made his professional debut for Jong Ajax on 30 August 2020, starting in a 4–0 home loss in the Eerste Divisie to Roda JC.

On 5 September 2022, Warmerdam scored his first goals for Jong Ajax, a late brace to cement a 4–0 victory against Heracles Almelo.

Warmerdam scored five goals in 82 league appearances for Jong Ajax over three seasons but did not manage to break into the first team, after 13 total years at the club.

=== De Graafschap ===
On 12 July 2023, Warmerdam signed a two-year contract with Eerste Divisie club De Graafschap. He made his competitive debut for the club on the first matchday of the season, starting in a goalless home draw against ADO Den Haag on 11 August. On 24 September, he scored his first goal for the Superboeren in a 2–1 league victory against MVV, two minutes after coming on as a first-half substitute for the injured Giovanni Büttner.

=== PSIM Yogyakarta ===
On 21 August 2025, Indonesian Super League club PSIM Yogyakarta announced the signing of Warmerdam, the season having already started. An ankle injury early in the campaign kept him out for around five months, and he did not make his debut until the 22nd matchweek, on 23 February 2026, when he replaced Yusaku Yamadera in the 75th minute of a home match against Bali United at the Sultan Agung Stadium. He went on to make 11 league appearances, all in the second half of the season, without scoring. PSIM announced his departure on 13 June 2026, with general manager Steven Sunny saying that the long spell of recovery had made the season a difficult one for the midfielder.

=== Return to De Graafschap ===
On 11 June 2026, De Graafschap announced that Warmerdam would return to the club on a free transfer, signing a one-year contract with an option for a further season. Technical manager Berry Powel said that the club had been looking for a midfielder who was comfortable on the ball and willing to move the game forward. Warmerdam started De Graafschap's opening fixture of the 2026–27 season, a 1–1 draw away to Helmond Sport on 9 August 2026.

== Career statistics ==
As of match played 20 September 2026

Appearances and goals by club, season and competition
Club	Season	League			National cup		Other		Total	
Club	Season	Division	Apps	Goals	Apps	Goals	Apps	Goals	Apps	Goals
Jong Ajax	2020–21	Eerste Divisie	22	0	—		—		22	0
Jong Ajax	2021–22	Eerste Divisie	24	0	—		—		24	0
Jong Ajax	2022–23	Eerste Divisie	36	5	—		—		36	5
Jong Ajax	Total		82	5	—		—		82	5
De Graafschap	2023–24	Eerste Divisie	37	4	2	0	2 (Note: Appearances in Eredivisie play-offs)	0	41	4
De Graafschap	2024–25	Eerste Divisie	36	5	1	0	—		35	5
De Graafschap	Total		73	9	3	0	2	0	78	9
PSIM Yogyakarta	2025–26	Super League	11	0	0	0	0	0	11	0
De Graafschap	2026–27	Eerste Divisie	7	2	0	0	—		7	2
Career total			173	16	3	0	2	0	178	16
