= Teun van Grunsven =

Dutch footballer (born 1999)

Personal information
- Date of birth: 30 October 1999 (age 27)
- Place of birth: Oss, Netherlands
- Height: 1.94 m (6 ft 4 in)
- Position: Centre-back

Team information
- Current team: Gwangju FC
- Number: 4

Youth career
- –2018: RKSV Margriet
- 2018–2019: OSS '20

Senior career*
Years	Team	Apps	(Gls)
2019–2020	RKC	0	(0)
2021–2026	Den Bosch	132	(6)
2026–	Gwangju	5	(0)
- * Club domestic league appearances and goals as of 4 August 2026

Teun van Grunsven (born 30 October 1999) is a Dutch professional footballer who plays as a centre-back for South Korean K League 1 club Gwangju FC.

== Career ==
He started playing first team football for RKSV Margriet when he was 16 years-old. In 2018, Van Grunsven left RKSV to join OSS '20. Playing for Oss led to professional interest in his development. He signed with RKC Waalwijk ahead of the 2019–20 season but would only prove to be played for the Jong RKC side, and did not make a first team league appearance in the Eredivisie, although he did score their solitary goal in a 6–1 defeat to Ajax in a pre-season friendly match in August 2020.

He joined FC Den Bosch from RKC Waalwijk in the winter of the 2020–21 season. However, injury kept him from playing during the rest of that first season at his new club. He made his senior debut the following season, in the opening fixture of the 2021–22 season, a 2–0 home victory against Helmond Sport on 6 August 2021 in the Eerste Divisie. Van Grunsven signed a new professional contract with Den Bosch a month later in September 2021. On 9 September 2022, Van Grunsven scored his first goal in professional football in an away match against FC Dordrecht, however, his 95th minute injury time goal only proved to be a consultation goal for his side as they were defeated 2–1 in the Eerste Divisie clash. In April 2025, despite still having a year-left on his contract with the club he agreed terms on a new two-year deal taking him up to the summer of 2027.

On 30 May 2026, he joined in Gwangju FC of South Korean K League 1.
