= Joey Roggeveen =

Surinamese footballer (born 1998)

Personal information
- Full name: Joey Ludwig Roggeveen
- Date of birth: 20 March 1998 (age 28)
- Place of birth: Hoofddorp, Netherlands
- Height: 1.87 m (6 ft 2 in)
- Position: Goalkeeper

Team information
- Current team: Noordwijk
- Number: 44

Youth career
- –2012: Ajax
- 2012–2016: AZ

Senior career*
Years	Team	Apps	(Gls)
2015–2018	Jong AZ	0	(0)
2015	→ Telstar (loan)	0	(0)
2018	Telstar	0	(0)
2018–2019	Jong AZ	5	(0)
2019–2021	Volendam	18	(0)
2019–2021	Jong Volendam	8	(0)
2021–2022	Jong Ajax	1	(0)
2023–2024	Den Bosch	10	(0)
2024–2025	FC Tulsa	4	(0)
2025–	Noordwijk	11	(0)

International career
2013	Netherlands U15	2	(0)
2023	Suriname	1	(0)
- * Club domestic league appearances and goals as of 4 August 2025

Joey Ludwig Roggeveen (born 20 March 1998) is a professional footballer who plays as a goalkeeper for Derde Divisie club Noordwijk. Born in the Netherlands, he plays for the Suriname national team.

== Club career ==
=== Early years ===
He made his Eerste Divisie debut for Jong AZ on 12 October 2018 in a game against Jong FC Utrecht, as a starter. He then had short stints with Telstar in 2015 and 2018, where he failed to make an appearance.

Between 2019 and 2021, he played for Volendam. On 25 June 2021 it was announced that Ajax had signed Roggeveen on a one-year contract for the reserves team' Jong Ajax as a free transfer from Volendam, competing in the Eerste Divisie, the second tier of professional football in the Netherlands.

=== Den Bosch ===
On 23 June 2023, Roggeveen signed a two-year contract with an option for an additional season with Eerste Divisie club Den Bosch. He made his competitive debut for the club on the first matchday of the season, starting in goal in a 1–0 home win over TOP Oss on 11 August. In late September, Roggeveen was benched in favour of Liverpool loanee Jakub Ojrzyński. He left the club on 1 February 2024, after his contract was terminated by mutual consent.

=== FC Tulsa ===
On 9 February 2024, Roggeveen signed with second-tier US side FC Tulsa who compete in the USL Championship. He left Tulsa following their 2024 season.

== International career ==
Born in the Netherlands, Roggeveen was born to a Dutch father and Surinamese mother. He was a youth international for the Netherlands. He has been called up by the Surinamese National squad to participate in a friendly match against Thailand on 27 March 2022.

== Career statistics ==
=== Club ===
As of match played 22 September 2023

Appearances and goals by club, season and competition
Club	Season	League			National cup		Other		Total	
Club	Season	Division	Apps	Goals	Apps	Goals	Apps	Goals	Apps	Goals
Jong AZ	2018–19	Eerste Divisie	5	0	—		—		5	0
Jong Volendam	2019–20	Tweede Divisie	5	0	—		—		5	0
Jong Volendam	2020–21	Tweede Divisie	3	0	—		—		3	0
Jong Volendam	Total		8	0	—		—		8	0
Volendam	2020–21	Eerste Divisie	18	0	1	0	0	0	19	0
Jong Ajax	2021–22	Eerste Divisie	1	0	—		—		1	0
Jong Ajax	2022–23	Eerste Divisie	0	0	—		—		0	0
Jong Ajax	Total		1	0	—		—		1	0
Den Bosch	2023–24	Eerste Divisie	6	0	0	0	—		6	0
Career total			38	0	1	0	0	0	39	0

== Honours ==
Jong AZ

- Tweede Divisie: 2016–17
