= Kik Pierie =

Dutch footballer (born 2000)

Personal information
- Date of birth: 20 July 2000 (age 26)
- Place of birth: Boston, Massachusetts, U.S.
- Height: 1.83 m (6 ft 0 in)
- Position: Centre-back

Youth career
- 2006–2011: LAC Frisia 1883
- 2011–2017: Heerenveen

Senior career*
Years	Team	Apps	(Gls)
2017–2019	Heerenveen	62	(2)
2019–2023	Ajax	0	(0)
2019–2023	Jong Ajax	37	(2)
2020–2022	→ Twente (loan)	27	(0)
2023	→ Excelsior (loan)	7	(1)
2023–2025	Excelsior	20	(3)
Total		153	(8)

International career
2015	Netherlands U15	3	(0)
2015–2016	Netherlands U16	9	(0)
2016–2017	Netherlands U17	14	(0)
2017–2018	Netherlands U19	10	(0)
2019	Netherlands U20	3	(0)
- * Club domestic league appearances and goals

Kik Pierie (born 20 July 2000) is a former professional footballer who played as a centre-back. Born in the United States, Pierie represented the Netherlands at international level.

== Early life ==
=== Formative years ===
Pierie was born in Boston, United States, to Dutch parents. His father, former Netherlands field hockey international Jean-Pierre Pierie, was working as a surgeon at Harvard University's hospital at the time. After one year the family returned to Zeist, their former hometown, and later moved to Leeuwarden when Pierie was five. His father later became professor of endoscopic surgery at the University Medical Center Groningen. His younger brothers, Take and Stijn, also played football.

=== Youth-team career ===
Pierie began his youth career with LAC Frisia 1883 before joining the academy of SC Heerenveen. As an under-15 player, he was named to the bench for the under-19 cup final and became a regular selection for Netherlands youth national teams. From late 2016, he was occasionally included on Heerenveen's first-team bench and was the youngest player registered in an Eredivisie squad that season.

== Club career ==
=== Heerenveen ===
Pierie made his professional debut on 17 May 2017 in the semi-final of the European play-offs, coming on at half-time for Jerry St. Juste in a 3–1 defeat to Utrecht. He made his Eredivisie debut on 26 August 2017 in a 2–1 away win against ADO Den Haag. In October 2017, The Guardian named him among the sixty most promising young players in world football. He established himself as a regular starter during the 2017–18 season.

He spent three seasons with Heerenveen, scoring his first senior goal on 26 August 2018 in a 5–3 home defeat to Feyenoord.

=== Ajax ===
In April 2019, Ajax announced that Pierie would join the club ahead of the 2019–20 season after agreeing a five-year contract. The fee paid to sc Heerenveen was reported as at least €4 million. He was an unused substitute as Ajax won the Johan Cruyff Shield on 27 July 2019. During the 2019–20 campaign he featured exclusively for Jong Ajax in the Eerste Divisie.

==== Loan to Twente ====
On 16 July 2020, Pierie joined FC Twente on a season-long loan from Ajax. Under head coach Ron Jans, he made 24 league appearances. He suffered an injury in pre-season that sidelined him for several months, but from November onwards he regularly featured in the starting line-up. He missed the final four matches of the season with a hamstring injury.

On 21 May 2021, it was announced that Pierie's loan would be extended for a further season. During the 2021–22 season, a persistent back injury ruled him out for much of the campaign, and he did not make his first appearance until February 2022. He finished the season with three appearances in all competitions. After the loan expired, he returned to Ajax.

=== Excelsior and retirement ===
On 30 November 2022, Pierie joined Excelsior on loan from Ajax for the second half of the 2022–23 season. An injury shortly after his arrival delayed his debut, which eventually came on 8 April 2023, when he started in a 4–0 defeat to PSV. He later described the rehabilitation period as mentally demanding and at times lonely, but said he had focused on remaining resilient. On 21 May, he scored his first goal for the club, opening the scoring in a 3–0 league win over Fortuna Sittard. The win contributed to Excelsior securing their Eredivisie status for the following season. On 11 July 2023, Ajax and Excelsior reached agreement on a permanent transfer, with Pierie signing a two-year contract with the Rotterdam club.

On 3 September 2025, Excelsior announced that Pierie's contract had been terminated by mutual consent, making him a free agent. At the same time, the club confirmed that he would remain associated with Excelsior through Kikstart Capital, a company he had founded to advise elite athletes on their sporting and financial development. On 12 September 2025, appearing on ESPN's talk show De Voetbalkantine, Pierie stated that he was stepping away from professional football, saying that the decision gave him a sense of freedom.

== International career ==
Born in the United States, Pierie was eligible to represent both the United States and the Netherlands. He chose to play for the Netherlands at youth level, earning caps across several age groups, but did not make a senior international appearance for either nation.

== Career statistics ==
Appearances and goals by club, season and competition
Club	Season	League			National cup		Other		Total	
Club	Season	Division	Apps	Goals	Apps	Goals	Apps	Goals	Apps	Goals
Heerenveen	2016–17	Eredivisie	0	0	0	0	2 (Note: Appearances in Eredivisie European qualification playoffs)	0	2	0
Heerenveen	2017–18	Eredivisie	31	0	1	0	2	0	34	0
Heerenveen	2018–19	Eredivisie	31	2	4	0	—		35	2
Heerenveen	Total		62	2	5	0	4	0	71	2
Jong Ajax	2019–20 (Note: Season curtailed due to COVID-19 pandemic in the Netherlands)	Eerste Divisie	22	1	—		—		22	1
Jong Ajax	2022–23	Eerste Divisie	15	1	—		—		15	1
Jong Ajax	Total		37	2	—		—		37	2
Twente (loan)	2020–21	Eredivisie	24	0	0	0	—		24	0
Twente (loan)	2021–22	Eredivisie	3	0	0	0	—		3	0
Twente (loan)	Total		27	0	0	0	—		27	0
Excelsior (loan)	2022–23	Eredivisie	7	1	0	0	—		7	1
Excelsior	2023–24	Eredivisie	5	1	0	0	—		5	1
Excelsior	2024–25	Eerste Divisie	15	2	1	0	—		16	2
Excelsior	Total		20	3	1	0	—		21	3
Career total			153	8	6	0	4	0	163	8

== Honours ==
Ajax

- Johan Cruyff Shield: 2019
