= Steven van der Sloot =

Dutch footballer (born 2002)

Personal information
- Full name: Steven Ako van der Sloot
- Date of birth: 6 July 2002 (age 24)
- Place of birth: Limbé, Cameroon
- Height: 1.75 m (5 ft 9 in)
- Position: Right-back

Team information
- Current team: Fortuna Düsseldorf
- Number: 2

Youth career
- Quick Steps
- –2012: Haaglandia
- 2012–2015: ADO Den Haag
- 2015–2019: Feyenoord
- 2019–2020: Ajax

Senior career*
Years	Team	Apps	(Gls)
2020–2022	Jong Ajax	13	(0)
2022–2024	Schalke 04 II	44	(3)
2024	Schalke 04	7	(0)
2024–2026	ADO Den Haag	72	(8)
2026–	Fortuna Düsseldorf	0	(0)

International career
2017–2018	Netherlands U16	7	(1)
2018–2019	Netherlands U17	13	(0)
2019	Netherlands U18	3	(0)
Medal record
Representing Netherlands
UEFA European Under-17 Championship
Winner	2019 Ireland
- * Club domestic league appearances and goals as of 28 April 2026

Steven Ako van der Sloot (born 6 July 2002) is a professional footballer who plays as a right-back for German 3. Liga club Fortuna Düsseldorf. Born in Cameroon, he represented the Netherlands at youth international level.

== Club career ==
Van der Sloot transferred to the Ajax youth academy on 28 May 2019. He joined the Schalke 04 youth academy on 18 May 2022. He made his first team debut for Schalke 04 in the 2. Bundesliga in a 1–1 away draw against Hannover 96 on 7 April 2024, coming on as a substitute in the 84th minute for Cédric Brunner.

Van der Sloot joined the Eerste Divisie club ADO Den Haag on 6 July 2024. He made his debut on 10 August 2024 against VVV-Venlo.

== International career ==
Van der Sloot was born in Cameroon to a Dutch father and a Cameroonian mother, and holds dual citizenship. He played for the Netherlands' youth national teams.

== Career statistics ==
As of match played 18 April 2026

Club	Season	League			National cup (Note: Includes KNVB Cup)		Total	
Club	Season	Division	Apps	Goals	Apps	Goals	Apps	Goals
Jong Ajax	2020–21	Eerste Divisie	3	0	—		3	0
Jong Ajax	2021–22	Eerste Divisie	10	0	—		10	0
Jong Ajax	Total		13	0	—		13	0
Schalke 04 II	2022–23	Regionalliga West	19	3	—		19	3
Schalke 04 II	2023–24	Regionalliga West	25	0	—		25	0
Schalke 04 II	Total		44	3	—		44	3
Schalke 04	2023–24	2. Bundesliga	7	0	0	0	7	0
ADO Den Haag	2024–25	Eerste Divisie	37	0	1	0	38	0
ADO Den Haag	2025–26	Eerste Divisie	36	8	1	0	37	8
ADO Den Haag	Total		73	8	2	0	75	8
Career total			134	11	2	0	136	11

== Honours ==
ADO Den Haag

- Eerste Divisie: 2025–26

Netherlands U17

- UEFA European Under-17 Championship: 2019
