= Nordin Musampa =

Dutch footballer (born 2001)

Personal information
- Date of birth: 13 October 2001 (age 25)
- Place of birth: Almere, Netherlands
- Height: 1.79 m (5 ft 10 in)
- Position: Centre-back

Youth career
- Zeeburgia
- Elinkwijk
- 2014–2016: Almere City
- 2016–2019: Ajax

Senior career*
Years	Team	Apps	(Gls)
2019–2022	Jong Ajax	56	(3)
2022–2024	Groningen	9	(0)
2025	Vitesse	2	(0)

International career^{‡}
2016	Netherlands U15	3	(0)
2017–2018	Netherlands U17	9	(0)
2018–2019	Netherlands U18	6	(0)
Medal record
Representing Netherlands
UEFA European Under-17 Championship
Winner	England 2018	U-17 Team
- * Club domestic league appearances and goals as of 16 May 2025 ‡ National team caps and goals as of 11:44, 10 April 2020 (UTC)

Nordin Musampa (born 13 October 2001) is a Dutch professional footballer who plays as a centre-back. He is a nephew of former Ajax player Kiki Musampa.

== Club career ==
Musampa began his football career with Zeeburgia and Elinkwijk, for whom he played until 2014. He then moved to Almere City for two years before moving to the renowned Ajax youth academy. In 2016–17, he made four appearances for the under-17 team. In the following season he established himself in the team and scored one goal in 26 games. In 2018–19, Musampa mainly played for the under-19 team, including in the UEFA Youth League.

He made his first appearance for Jong Ajax in the second-tier Eerste Divisie as a starter in a match against Jong Utrecht on 25 March 2019. In the following season, he only played for the U19 team. However, he would sign his first professional contract with Jong Ajax in June 2020, alongside fellow talent Terrence Douglas. He grew into a starter for the team during the 2020–21 season, and scored his first professional goal against MVV on 23 October 2020.

On 22 April 2022, Musampa signed a three-year deal with Groningen, beginning in the 2022–23 season.

After leaving Groningen in September 2024, on 10 January 2025 Musampa joined Vitesse on an amateur basis.

== International career ==
Musampa has played for several national youth teams for the Netherlands. With the under-17 team he won the 2018 UEFA European Under-17 Championship, after beating Italy in the final.

== Career statistics ==
=== Club ===
As of 10 April 2020

Appearances and goals by club, season and competition
Club	Season	League			Cup		Continental		Other		Total	
Club	Season	Division	Apps	Goals	Apps	Goals	Apps	Goals	Apps	Goals	Apps	Goals
Jong Ajax	2018–19	Eerste Divisie	1	0	–		–		0	0	1	0
Jong Ajax	2019–20	Eerste Divisie	0	0	–		–		0	0	9	0
Career total			1	0	0	0	0	0	0	0	1	0

== Honours ==
Netherlands U17

- UEFA European Under-17 Championship: 2018
