= 2020–21 Jong Ajax season =

Jong Ajax
2020–21 season
- Chairman: Hennie Henrichs
- Manager: Mitchell van der Gaag
- Stadium: Sportpark De Toekomst
- Eerste Divisie: 16th
- Top goalscorer: League: Brian Brobbey (9); All: Brian Brobbey (9)
Home colours	Away colours

During the 2020–21 season, Jong Ajax participated in the Dutch Eerste Divisie, the 2nd tier of professional football in the Netherlands. It was their 8th consecutive season in the Eerste Divisie.

== Squad ==
As of 1 February 2021

Note: Flags indicate national team as defined under FIFA eligibility rules; some limited exceptions apply. Players may hold more than one non-FIFA nationality.

No.	Pos.	Nation	Player
30	FW	NED	Brian Brobbey
35	DF	NED	Neraysho Kasanwirjo
36	MF	BRA	Giovanni
37	FW	NED	Naci Ünüvar
38	MF	USA	Alex Mendez
40	FW	NED	Sontje Hansen
41	MF	NED	Enric Llansana
42	MF	NED	Quinten Timber
43	DF	NED	Nordin Musampa
44	MF	NED	Youri Regeer
45	DF	NED	Liam van Gelderen
46	DF	NED	Anass Salah-Eddine
48	DF	NED	Terrence Douglas

No.	Pos.	Nation	Player
49	MF	NED	Max de Waal
51	GK	NED	Daan Reiziger
52	GK	NED	Calvin Raatsie
—	GK	NED	Nick Hengelman
—	DF	NED	Youri Baas
—	DF	NED	Steven van der Sloot
—	MF	NED	Kian Fitz-Jim
—	MF	TUR	Tunahan Taşçı
—	MF	NED	Donny Warmerdam
—	FW	NED	Ar'jany Martha
—	FW	NED	Jaymillio Pinas
—	FW	DEN	Christian Rasmussen

== Transfers ==
For a list of all Dutch football transfers in the summer window (1 July 2020 to 31 August 2020) please see List of Dutch football transfers summer 2020. For a list of all Dutch football transfers in the winter window (1 January 2021 to 1 February 2021) please see List of Dutch football transfers winter 2020–21.

=== Summer ===
In:

No.	Pos.	Nation	Player
—	GK	NED	Calvin Raatsie (from Ajax U19)
—	GK	NED	Nick Hengelman (from (South Africa) Ajax Cape Town)
—	DF	NED	Neraysho Kasanwirjo (from Ajax U19)
—	DF	NED	Nordin Musampa (from Ajax U19)
—	DF	NED	Devyne Rensch (from Ajax U19)
—	DF	NED	Anass Salah-Eddine (from Ajax U19)
—	DF	NED	Steven van der Sloot (from Ajax U19)
—	MF	NED	Enric Llansana (from Ajax U19)
—	MF	NED	Youri Regeer (from Ajax U19)
—	MF	NED	Max de Waal (from Ajax U19)
—	FW	BFA	Hassane Bandé (from Ajax)

Out:

No.	Pos.	Nation	Player
2	DF	NED	Jurriën Timber (to Ajax)
15	DF	NED	Devyne Rensch (to Ajax)
25	MF	NED	Kenneth Taylor (to Ajax)
—	GK	NED	Stan van Bladeren (to (Denmark) Silkeborg)
—	GK	MAR	Issam El Maach (released, later signed with RKC Waalwijk)
—	DF	NED	Juan Castillo (loan return to (England) Chelsea U23)
—	DF	RSA	Dean Solomons (released)
—	FW	RSA	Leo Thethani (released)

=== Winter ===
In:

No.	Pos.	Nation	Player
—	DF	NED	Youri Baas (from Ajax U18)
—	MF	NED	Kian Fitz-Jim (from Ajax U18)
—	MF	NED	Donny Warmerdam (from Ajax U18)
—	FW	NED	Ar'jany Martha (from Ajax U18)
—	FW	NED	Jaymillio Pinas (from Ajax U18)
—	FW	DEN	Christian Rasmussen (from Ajax U18)

Out:

No.	Pos.	Nation	Player
26	MF	DEN	Victor Jensen (on loan at (Denmark) Nordsjælland)
—	FW	BFA	Hassane Bandé (on loan at (Croatia) Istra)

== Pre-season and friendlies ==
Win Draw Loss Fixtures

1 August 2020	Almere City (Netherlands)	2–0	(Netherlands) Jong Ajax	Almere, Netherlands
14:45 CEST	Kaandorp 22'; Goselink 45'	Report		Stadium: Yanmar Stadion; Attendance: 736

5 August 2020	Jong Ajax (Netherlands)	2–0	(Netherlands) Telstar	Duivendrecht, Netherlands
15:00 CEST	Q. Timber 9'; De Waal 85'	Report		Stadium: Sportpark De Toekomst

8 August 2020	Jong Ajax (Netherlands)	2–3	(Netherlands) Jong AZ	Duivendrecht, Netherlands
10:30 CEST		Report		Stadium: Sportpark De Toekomst

12 August 2020	Jong Ajax (Netherlands)	1–2	(Netherlands) Jong FC Utrecht	Duivendrecht, Netherlands
18:45 CEST	Rasmussen 58'	Report	Mallahi 62'; Özcan 67'	Stadium: Sportpark De Toekomst

== Competitions ==
=== Eerste Divisie ===
==== League table ====
Pos	Team	Pld	W	D	L	GF	GA	GD	Pts	Promotion or qualification
14	Jong PSV	38	10	10	18	54	65	−11	40	Reserve teams are not eligible to be promoted to the 2021–22 Eredivisie
15	FC Eindhoven	38	10	10	18	50	62	−12	40	
16	Jong Ajax	38	10	10	18	55	71	−16	40	Reserve teams are not eligible to be promoted to the 2021–22 Eredivisie
17	Jong AZ	38	11	5	22	56	92	−36	38	Reserve teams are not eligible to be promoted to the 2021–22 Eredivisie
18	Jong FC Utrecht	38	11	2	25	53	77	−24	35	Reserve teams are not eligible to be promoted to the 2021–22 Eredivisie

Source: Soccerway, Keuken Kampioen Divisie (in Dutch)
Rules for classification: Season in progress: 1) Most points won; 2) Less points lost; 3) Goal difference; 4) Goals scored; 5) Alphabetical order; End of season: 1) Points; 2) Goal difference; 3) Goals scored; 4) Head-to-head points; 5) Head-to-head goal difference; 6) Head-to-head away goals scored; 7) Play-off if relevant for deciding champion, relegation or participating in a European league, otherwise by draw. 8) Penalty shoot-out (only after a play-off)

==== Period 1 ====
Pos	Team	Pld	W	D	L	GF	GA	GD	Pts	Qualification
6	FC Volendam	9	4	3	2	23	11	+12	15	
7	Telstar	9	4	3	2	18	13	+5	15	
8	Jong Ajax	9	5	0	4	19	17	+2	15	Reserves teams cannot participate in the promotion play-offs
9	Excelsior	9	4	1	4	19	16	+3	13	
10	Roda JC Kerkrade	9	3	3	3	17	14	+3	12	

Source: Keuken Kampioen Divisie (in Dutch)
Rules for classification: 1) points; 2) goal difference; 3) number of goals scored

==== Period 2 ====
Pos	Team	Pld	W	D	L	GF	GA	GD	Pts	Qualification
13	Telstar	10	4	1	5	16	15	+1	13	
14	Jong PSV	10	2	3	5	15	18	−3	9	Reserves teams cannot participate in the promotion play-offs
15	Jong Ajax	10	1	5	4	14	20	−6	8	Reserves teams cannot participate in the promotion play-offs
16	MVV Maastricht	10	2	2	6	12	22	−10	8	
17	Jong AZ	10	2	2	6	7	17	−10	8	Reserves teams cannot participate in the promotion play-offs

Source: Keuken Kampioen Divisie (in Dutch)
Rules for classification: 1) points; 2) goal difference; 3) number of goals scored

==== Period 3 ====
Pos	Team	Pld	W	D	L	GF	GA	GD	Pts	Qualification
11	FC Dordrecht	9	3	1	5	9	19	−10	10	
12	Helmond Sport	9	2	3	4	14	19	−5	9	
13	Jong Ajax	9	2	2	5	12	19	−7	8	Reserves teams cannot participate in the promotion play-offs
14	FC Den Bosch	9	2	2	5	14	23	−9	8	
15	Jong AZ	9	2	2	5	15	27	−12	8	Reserves teams cannot participate in the promotion play-offs

Source: Keuken Kampioen Divisie (in Dutch)
Rules for classification: 1) points; 2) goal difference; 3) number of goals scored

==== Period 4 ====
Pos	Team	Pld	W	D	L	GF	GA	GD	Pts	Qualification
15	Roda JC Kerkrade	10	3	3	4	13	20	−7	12	
16	FC Eindhoven	10	3	2	5	12	13	−1	11	
17	Jong Ajax	10	2	3	5	10	15	−5	9	Reserves teams cannot participate in the promotion play-offs
18	Telstar	10	1	4	5	12	18	−6	7	
19	Jong FC Utrecht	10	2	1	7	15	23	−8	7	Reserves teams cannot participate in the promotion play-offs

Source: Keuken Kampioen Divisie (in Dutch)
Rules for classification: 1) points; 2) goal difference; 3) number of goals scored

==== Results summary ====
Overall								Home						Away					
Pld	W	D	L	GF	GA	GD	Pts	W	D	L	GF	GA	GD	W	D	L	GF	GA	GD
38	10	10	18	55	71	−16	40	4	6	8	25	33	−8	6	4	10	30	38	−8

Last updated: 12 May 2021.
Source: Keuken Kampionen Divisie

==== Results by round ====
Round	1	2	3	4	5	6	7	8	9	10	11	12	13	14	15	16	17	18	19	20	21	22	23	24	25	26	27	28	29	30	31	32	33	34	35	36	37	38
Ground	H	H	A	A	H	A	H	H	A	H	A	H	A	A	H	A	H	A	H	A	H	A	H	H	A	A	H	A	H	A	H	A	H	A	H	A	H	A
Result	L	L	L	W	W	L	W	W	W	L	W	D	D	L	D	D	L	L	D	W	L	W	L	D	L	L	L	D	W	L	D	D	L	L	L	L	D	W
Position	18	20	19	17	10	16	11	10	8	8	7	8	10	11	11	11	11	12	13	11	12	10	12	12	12	12	11	12	12	13	13	14	15	16	16	16	17	16

Updated to match(es) played on 12 May 2021. Source: Keuken Kampionen Divisie
A = Away; H = Home; W = Win; D = Draw; L = Loss

==== Matches ====
30 August 2020 1	Jong Ajax	0–4	Roda JC Kerkrade	Duivendrecht
14:30 CEST	Reeger (yellow card) 26'	Report	Alberg 21'; Croux 70' (pen.); Klaasen (yellow card) 74'; Luijckx 82'; Vossebelt 90+3'	Stadium: Sportpark De Toekomst; Attendance: 151; Referee: Erwin Blank

11 September 2020 3	NEC Nijmegen	2–1	Jong Ajax	Nijmegen
21:00 CEST	Van Eijden 19'; Bruijn 82' (pen.)	Report	Taylor (yellow card) 48'; Musampa (yellow card) 58'; Giovanni 80'; Rasmussen (yellow card) 90+3'	Stadium: Stadion de Goffert; Attendance: 2,892; Referee: Alex Bos

14 September 2020 2	Jong Ajax	1–2	Jong PSV	Duivendrecht
18:45 CEST	Ekkelenkamp 45+1'; Llansana (yellow card) 63'; Brobbey (yellow card) 79'; Ünüvar (yellow card) 90+3'	Report	De Haas 18', (yellow card) 65' (yellow-red card) 69'; Touré 26'; Thomas (yellow card) 89'	Stadium: Sportpark De Toekomst; Attendance: 106; Referee: Martin Pérez

18 September 2020 4	Go Ahead Eagles	0–3	Jong Ajax	Deventer
21:00 CEST	Lucassen (yellow card) 20'; Brouwers (yellow card) 90'; Veldmate (penalty missed) 90+2'	Report	Taylor 35' (pen.), (yellow card) 36'; Brobbey 59'; De Waal (yellow card) 80' (yellow-red card) 90+6'; Musampa (yellow card) 82'; Mendez (yellow card) 90+1'; Rasmussen (yellow card) 90+3'; Jensen 90+4'	Stadium: De Adelaarshorst; Attendance: 2,111; Referee: Clay Ruperti

28 September 2020 5	Jong Ajax	3−0	Excelsior	Duivendrecht
18:45 CEST	Taylor (yellow card) 30', (goal) 87'; Brobbey 52'; Traoré 59'	Report	Matthys (yellow card) 90+2'	Stadium: Sportpark De Toekomst; Attendance: 197; Referee: Sam Dröge

2 October 2020 6	NAC Breda	4−0	Jong Ajax	Breda
21:00 CEST	Van Hooijdonk 9' (pen.), 32', 74'; Rösler (yellow card) 61'; Malone (yellow card) 71'; Venema 77'	Report	Douglas (yellow card) 8'; Brobbey (yellow card) 53'	Stadium: Rat Verlegh Stadion; Attendance: 0 Referee: Ingmar Oostrom

16 October 2020 8	Jong Ajax	3−2	Jong AZ	Duivendrecht
18:45 CEST	Llansana 14', (yellow card) 65'; Jensen (red card) 22'; Brobbey 42', 50' (pen.), (yellow card) 90+3'; Douglas (yellow card) 75'; Regeer (yellow card) 89'	Report	Koopmeiners 7'; Goudmijn (yellow card) 22'; Evora (yellow card) 49'; Margaret 58'; Berkhout (yellow card) 63'; Velthuis (yellow card) 78'	Stadium: Sportpark De Toekomst; Attendance: 0 Referee: Edgar Bijl

19 October 2020 7	Jong Ajax	3−2	Jong FC Utrecht	Duivendrecht
18:45 CEST	Kasanwirjo (yellow card) 38'; Hansen 61'; Douglas 71'; Brobbey 84'	Report	Van den Berg (yellow card) 13'; Hilterman 77', 87'; Lonwijk (yellow card) 82'; Pieters (yellow card) 90+4'	Stadium: Sportpark De Toekomst; Attendance: 0 Referee: Robin Hensgens

23 October 2020 9	MVV Maastricht	1−5	Jong Ajax	Maastricht
18:45 CEST	Déom 25'; Heerings (yellow card) 63'; Van Acker (yellow card) 90+1'	Report	De Waal 27'; Rensch 51'; Musampa 62'; Giovanni 67'; Ünüvar 79'	Stadium: De Geusselt; Attendance: 0 Referee: Stan Teuben

30 October 2020 10	Jong Ajax	1−4	Almere City	Duivendrecht
18:45 CET	Taylor 58' (pen.); Taşçı (yellow card) 80'; Douglas (yellow card) 84'	Report	Kasanwirjo 2' (o.g.); Verheydt 3'; Sørensen 25'; Mannes (yellow card) 34'; Helstrup 56'; Receveur (yellow card) 58'	Stadium: Sportpark De Toekomst; Attendance: 0 Referee: Alex Bos

7 November 2020 11	SC Cambuur	2−3	Jong Ajax	Leeuwarden
16:30 CET	Hoedemakers 15'; Breij 22'; Maulun (yellow card) 75'	Report	Taylor 8'; Douglas (yellow card) 56'; Rensch 82'; Llansana 88'; Scherpen (yellow card) 90+4'	Stadium: Cambuur Stadion; Attendance: 0 Referee: Christiaan Bax

20 November 2020 13	FC Den Bosch	2−2	Jong Ajax	's-Hertogenbosch
21:00 CET	Trotman 53', 76'	Report	Brobbey 3' (pen.), 5'	Stadium: De Vliert; Attendance: 0 Referee: Nick Smit

23 November 2020 12	Jong Ajax	1−1	FC Volendam	Duivendrecht
21:00 CET	Jensen 35'; Regeer (yellow card) 78'	Report	Kaars 31'; Mulattieri (yellow card) 66'; Eerdhuijzen (yellow card) 81'	Stadium: Sportpark De Toekomst; Attendance: 0 Referee: Ingmar Oostrom

28 November 2020 14	FC Dordrecht	3−1	Jong Ajax	Dordrecht
16:30 CET	Schuurman 6'; Jansen 43', (yellow card) 74'; Vermeulen (yellow card) 63'; Dos Santos 77'; Vicario (yellow card) 85'	Report	Brobbey 45+1'	Stadium: GN Bouw Stadion; Attendance: 0 Referee: Luca Cantineau

7 December 2020 15	Jong Ajax	1−1	FC Eindhoven	Duivendrecht
18:45 CET	Rensch 34'; Regeer (yellow card) 45'	Report	Peijnenburg (yellow card) 41'; Van Son (yellow card) 60'; De Keersmaecker (yellow card) 63'; Van Kleef 90' (pen.)	Stadium: Sportpark De Toekomst; Attendance: 0 Referee: Martijn Vos

11 December 2020 16	De Graafschap	2−2	Jong Ajax	Doetinchem
21:00 CET	Douglas 12' (o.g.); Seuntjens 27'; Verbeek (red card) 31'; Van Huizen (yellow card) 87'; Van Mieghem (yellow card) 90'	Report	Martha 16'; Hlynsson (yellow card) 41'; Hansen 57'	Stadium: De Vijverberg; Attendance: 0 Referee: Laurens Gerrets

21 December 2020 17	Jong Ajax	1−2	SC Telstar	Duivendrecht
20:00 CET	Martha 11'; Musampa (yellow card) 30'; Baas (yellow card) 43'; Bandé (red card) 48'	Report	Najah (yellow card) 45+1'; Fernandes 54'; Bronkhorst (yellow card) 58'; Van Wetten 84'	Stadium: Sportpark De Toekomst; Attendance: 0 Referee: Sam Dröge

4 January 2021 18	TOP Oss	1−0	Jong Ajax	Oss
20:00 CET	Lammers 9'; Guezen (yellow card) 36'; Stuy van den Herik (yellow card) 59'; Geens (yellow card) 78'	Report	Musampa (yellow card) 85'	Stadium: Frans Heesen Stadion; Attendance: 0 Referee: Robin Gansner

9 January 2021 19	Jong Ajax	2−2	Helmond Sport	Duivendrecht
14:00 CET	Pinas 11'; Jensen 45'; Baas (yellow card) 45+1'; Warmerdam (yellow card) 75'	Report	Van Hoorenbeeck 15'; Loukili 30'; De Bie (yellow card) 81'	Stadium: Sportpark De Toekomst; Attendance: 0 Referee: Martijn Vos

18 January 2021 20	Jong FC Utrecht	1−2	Jong Ajax	Utrecht
18:45 CET	Pieters 90+1'	Report	Brobbey 2'; Memengi 42' (o.g.); Hansen (yellow card) 73'	Stadium: Sportcomplex Zoudenbalch; Attendance: 0 Referee: Clay Ruperti

25 January 2021 21	Jong Ajax	0−2	Go Ahead Eagles	Duivendrecht
18:45 CET	Regeer (yellow card) 20'; Warmerdam (yellow card) 52'; Ünüvar (yellow card) 68'	Report	Kuipers (yellow card) 37'; Veldmate (yellow card) 49'; Hendriks 90+2'; Van Hoeven 90+4'	Stadium: Sportpark De Toekomst; Attendance: 0 Referee: Edgar Bijl

29 January 2021 22	Jong PSV	1−2	Jong Ajax	Eindhoven
18:45 CET	Sambo 67'; Fofana (yellow card) 83'	Report	Jensen 25'; Ünüvar (yellow card) 30', (goal) 71'; Warmerdam (yellow card) 40'	Stadium: De Herdgang; Attendance: 0 Referee: Stan Teuben

15 February 2021 24	Jong Ajax	1−2	FC Dordrecht	Duivendrecht
18:45 CET	Traoré 54'; Taylor (yellow card) 76'; Llansana (red card) 86'	Report	Schuurman (yellow card) 55'; Bannis 77' (pen.); Muringen 84'	Stadium: Sportpark De Toekomst; Attendance: 0 Referee: Sam Dröge

19 February 2021 23	Jong Ajax	1−1	SC Cambuur	Duivendrecht
16:30 CET	Ünüvar 21'; Douglas (yellow card) 36'	Report	Schmidt (yellow card) 26'; Jacobs (yellow card) 29'; Mühren 49'; Mac-Intosch (yellow card) 72'	Stadium: Sportpark De Toekomst; Attendance: 0 Referee: Erwin Blank
Note: The game was originally scheduled for 8 February, but it has been postponed due to severe winter conditions. On 12 February the KNVB announced the new date.

23 February 2021 25	FC Volendam	3−2	Jong Ajax	Volendam
18:45 CET	Mulattieri (yellow card) 76', (goal) 90+5'; El Azzouzi 85', 90+6'	Report	Baas (yellow card) 45'; Ünüvar 60'; Fitz-Jim 71'	Stadium: Kras Stadion; Attendance: 0 Referee: Robin Gansner

1 March 2021 26	Excelsior	5−1	Jong Ajax	Rotterdam
18:45 CET	Hillen 8' (o.g.); Baas 20'; Niemeijer 24'; Aberkane (yellow card) 80'; Moreira 82'; Zwarts 90+5'	Report	Kasanwirjo (yellow card) 54'; Taylor 74' (pen.)	Stadium: Van Donge & De Roo Stadion; Attendance: 0 Referee: Joey Kooij

8 March 2021 27	Jong Ajax	1−2	FC Den Bosch	Duivendrecht
18:45 CET	Taylor 10' (pen.); Baas (yellow card) 56'	Report	Hornkamp 42'; Kuijpers 70'; Postema (yellow card) 87'	Stadium: Sportpark De Toekomst; Attendance: 0 Referee: Martin Pérez

12 March 2021 28	Roda JC Kerkrade	2−2	Jong Ajax	Kerkrade
21:00 CET	Vossebelt (yellow card) 41'; Falkenburg 45'; Vente 59'	Report	Traoré (yellow card) 34'; Fitz-Jim (yellow card) 79'; Kasanwirjo 81'; Llansana 83'	Stadium: Parkstad Limburg Stadion; Attendance: 0 Referee: Jannick van der Laan

15 March 2021 30	Jong AZ	2−1	Jong Ajax	Alkmaar
20:00 CET	Duin 33'; Goudmijn 69'	Report	Ünüvar 25'; Taylor (yellow card) 56'	Stadium: AFAS Trainingscomplex; Attendance: 0 Referee: Marc Nagtegaal

19 March 2021 29	Jong Ajax	4−3	MVV Maastricht	Duivendrecht
20:00 CET	Ünüvar 12'; Baas (yellow card) 37'; Musampa 39'; Martha 53'; Hansen 76'	Report	Naudts 29', 87'; Mickels 63'	Stadium: Sportpark De Toekomst; Attendance: 0 Referee: Jesse Rozendal

2 April 2021 31	Jong Ajax	1−1	NAC Breda	Duivendrecht
20:00 CEST	Ünüvar (penalty missed) 43'; Mendez 68'; Douglas (yellow card) 71' (yellow-red card) 90+1'	Report	El Allouchi 55' (pen.); Bilate (yellow card) 57'	Stadium: Sportpark De Toekomst; Attendance: 0 Referee: Richard Martens

5 April 2021 32	Helmond Sport	1−1	Jong Ajax	Helmond
14:30 CEST	Van Hoorenbeeck (yellow card) 33'; Van Keilegom 55'; Vereijken (yellow card) 59'	Report	Llansana (yellow card) 15'; Ünüvar 73'	Stadium: Stadion De Braak; Attendance: 0 Referee: Laurens Gerrets

9 April 2021 33	Jong Ajax	0−1	TOP Oss	Duivendrecht
20:00 CEST		Report	Sanches 48'	Stadium: Sportpark De Toekomst; Attendance: 0 Referee: Clay Ruperti

16 April 2021 34	FC Eindhoven	3−0	Jong Ajax	Eindhoven
20:00 CEST	Seedorf (yellow card) 5'; Pozo 56'; Peijnenburg 63', (yellow card) 76'; Van Kleef (yellow card) 87'; Donkor 90'	Report	Taylor (penalty missed) 5'; Rasmussen (yellow card) 18'	Stadium: Jan Louwers Stadion; Attendance: 0 Referee: Stan Teuben

23 April 2021 35	Jong Ajax	0−1	NEC Nijmegen	Duivendrecht
20:00 CEST	Kasanwirjo (yellow card) 64' (yellow-red card) 75'	Report	Vet (yellow card) 23'; Barreto 34'; El Karouani (yellow card) 66'	Stadium: Sportpark De Toekomst; Attendance: 0 Referee: Martijn Vos

30 April 2021 36	Almere City	1−0	Jong Ajax	Almere
20:00 CEST	Tunga (yellow card) 39'; Woud (yellow card) 45+1'; Hammouti (yellow card) 71'; Yeboah 75'; Lesquoy (yellow card) 83'	Report	Brobbey (penalty missed) 39'; Hansen (yellow card) 45+1'; Regeer (yellow card) 87'; Fitz-Jim (yellow card) 66' (yellow-red card) 90+1'	Stadium: Yanmar Stadion; Attendance: 500; Referee: Luca Cantineau

7 May 2021 37	Jong Ajax	1−1	De Graafschap	Duivendrecht
20:00 CEST	Taylor 23'; Reiziger (yellow card) 78'; Mendez (yellow card) 90'	Report	Van Huizen 64', (yellow card) 90'	Stadium: Sportpark De Toekomst; Attendance: 0 Referee: Marc Nagtegaal

12 May 2021 38	SC Telstar	1−2	Jong Ajax	Velsen
20:00 CEST	Vandermeulen (yellow card) 20'; Bronkhorst 48'	Report	Van Axel Dongen 42'; Fitz-Jim (yellow card) 45+5'; Van Gelderen 58'; Douglas (yellow card) 68'	Stadium: Rabobank IJmond Stadion; Attendance: 0 Referee: Sam Dröge

== Statistics ==
=== Appearances and goals ===
No.	Pos.	Nat	Name	Total		Eerste Divisie		Discipline		
No.	Pos.	Nat	Name	Apps	Goals	Apps	Goals	Yellow card	Second yellow card	Red card
	DF	(Netherlands) NED	Terrence Douglas	30	1	23+7	1	7	1	0
	DF	(Netherlands) NED	Liam van Gelderen	10	1	6+4	1	0	0	0
	DF	(Netherlands) NED	Neraysho Kasanwirjo	34	1	34	1	3	1	0
	DF	(Netherlands) NED	Nordin Musampa	25	2	12+13	2	3	0	0
	DF	(Netherlands) NED	Devyne Rensch	11	3	11	3	0	0	0
	DF	(Netherlands) NED	Steven van der Sloot	3	0	2+1	0	0	0	0
	MF	(Brazil) BRA	Giovanni	23	2	10+13	2	0	0	0
	MF	(Netherlands) NED	Enric Llansana	33	3	30+3	3	3	0	1
	MF	(United States) USA	Alex Mendez	17	1	6+11	1	2	0	0
	MF	(Netherlands) NED	Youri Regeer	37	0	37	0	6	0	0
	MF	(Turkey) TUR	Tunahan Taşçı	5	0	0+5	0	0	0	0
	MF	(Netherlands) NED	Kenneth Taylor	29	7	29	7	5	0	0
	MF	(Netherlands) NED	Quinten Timber	13	0	12+1	0	0	0	0
	MF	(Netherlands) NED	Max de Waal	19	1	9+10	1	0	1	0
	MF	(Netherlands) NED	Donny Warmerdam	21	0	16+5	0	2	0	0
	FW	(Netherlands) NED	Brian Brobbey	17	9	13+4	9	3	0	0
	FW	(Netherlands) NED	Sontje Hansen	28	3	20+8	3	2	0	0
	FW	(Netherlands) NED	Jaymillio Pinas	16	1	3+13	1	0	0	0
	FW	(Netherlands) NED	Naci Ünüvar	29	7	22+7	7	2	0	0
First team players who have made appearances for reserve squad:
	GK	(Croatia) CRO	Dominik Kotarski	13	0	13	0	0	0	0
	GK	(Netherlands) NED	Kjell Scherpen	15	0	15	0	1	0	0
	DF	(Netherlands) NED	Jurriën Timber	4	0	4	0	0	0	0
	MF	(Netherlands) NED	Jurgen Ekkelenkamp	6	1	6	1	0	0	0
	FW	(Burkina Faso) BFA	Lassina Traoré	10	2	10	2	1	0	0
Youth players who have made appearances for reserve squad:
	GK	(Netherlands) NED	Calvin Raatsie	1	0	1	0	0	0	0
	GK	(Netherlands) NED	Daan Reiziger	9	0	9	0	1	0	0
	DF	(Netherlands) NED	Youri Baas	17	0	14+3	0	5	0	0
	DF	(Netherlands) NED	Rio Hillen	8	0	2+6	0	0	0	0
	DF	(Netherlands) NED	Anass Salah-Eddine	3	0	0+3	0	0	0	0
	MF	(Netherlands) NED	Kian Fitz-Jim	20	1	9+11	1	3	1	0
	MF	(Iceland) ISL	Kristian Hlynsson	6	0	1+5	0	0	0	0
	MF	(Netherlands) NED	Gibson Yah	7	0	0+7	0	0	0	0
	FW	(Netherlands) NED	Amourricho van Axel Dongen	2	1	2	1	0	0	0
	FW	(Netherlands) NED	Ar'jany Martha	28	3	17+11	3	0	0	0
	FW	(Denmark) DEN	Christian Rasmussen	16	0	6+10	0	2	0	0
Players sold or loaned out after the start of the season:
	MF	(Denmark) DEN	Victor Jensen	14	4	13+1	4	0	0	1
	FW	(Burkina Faso) BFA	Hassane Bandé	4	0	1+3	0	0	0	1

Last updated: 12 May 2021
Source: Competitions

=== Clean sheets ===
Rank	Pos	Nat	Name	Eerste Divisie	Matches
1	GK	(Netherlands)	Kjell Scherpen	2	15
2	GK	(Croatia)	Dominik Kotarski	0	13
3	GK	(Netherlands)	Daan Reiziger	0	9
4	GK	(Netherlands)	Calvin Raatsie	0	1
Totals				2	38

Last updated: 12 May 2021
