= 2021–22 AFC Ajax season =

Dutch football club season

AFC Ajax
2021–22 season
- Owner: AFC Ajax N.V.
- CEO: Edwin van der Sar
- Head coach: Erik ten Hag
- Stadium: Johan Cruyff Arena
- Eredivisie: 1st
- KNVB Cup: Runners-up
- Johan Cruyff Shield: Runners-up
- UEFA Champions League: Round of 16
- Top goalscorer: League: Sébastien Haller (21); All: Sébastien Haller (34)
- Highest home attendance: 54,709 (vs. Feyenoord, 20 March 2022 Eredivisie)
- Lowest home attendance: 0 (several games with restricted attendance, due to COVID-19 pandemic government measurements)
- Average home league attendance: 36,552
- Biggest win: 9–0 (vs. SC Cambuur (H), 19 September 2021 Eredivisie); 9–0 (vs. Excelsior Maassluis (H), 20 January 2022 KNVB Cup)
- Biggest defeat: 0–4 (vs. PSV (H), 7 August 2021 Johan Cruyff Shield)
Home colours	Away colours	Third colours

The 2021–22 season was the 122nd season in the existence of AFC Ajax and the club's 66th consecutive season in the top flight of Dutch football. In addition to the domestic league, Ajax participated in this season's edition of the KNVB Cup, the UEFA Champions League and the Johan Cruyff Shield.

== Players ==
=== First-team squad ===
As of 7 March 2022

Note: Flags indicate national team as defined under FIFA eligibility rules; some limited exceptions apply. Players may hold more than one non-FIFA nationality.

No.	Pos.	Nation	Player
1	GK	NED	Maarten Stekelenburg
2	DF	NED	Jurriën Timber
3	DF	NED	Perr Schuurs
4	MF	MEX	Edson Álvarez
5	DF	SUR	Sean Klaiber
6	MF	NED	Davy Klaassen (3rd captain)
8	MF	NED	Ryan Gravenberch
9	FW	BRA	Danilo
10	FW	SRB	Dušan Tadić (captain)
11	FW	BRA	Antony
12	DF	MAR	Noussair Mazraoui
15	DF	NED	Devyne Rensch
16	GK	NED	Jay Gorter
17	DF	NED	Daley Blind (vice-captain)

No.	Pos.	Nation	Player
18	FW	NED	Brian Brobbey (on loan from RB Leipzig)
19	FW	MAR	Zakaria Labyad
20	MF	GHA	Mohammed Kudus
21	DF	ARG	Lisandro Martínez
22	FW	CIV	Sébastien Haller
23	FW	NED	Steven Berghuis
24	GK	CMR	André Onana
25	MF	NED	Kenneth Taylor
27	MF	NED	Mohamed Ihattaren (on loan from Juventus)
30	FW	DEN	Mohamed Daramy
31	DF	ARG	Nicolás Tagliafico
32	GK	NED	Remko Pasveer
33	GK	POL	Przemysław Tytoń

=== Players out on loan ===
Note: Flags indicate national team as defined under FIFA eligibility rules; some limited exceptions apply. Players may hold more than one non-FIFA nationality.

No.	Pos.	Nation	Player
26	MF	DEN	Victor Jensen (at Rosenborg until 31 December 2022)
28	DF	ARG	Lisandro Magallán (at Anderlecht until 30 June 2022)
32	FW	BFA	Hassane Bandé (at Istra 1961 until 30 June 2022)

No.	Pos.	Nation	Player
33	GK	CRO	Dominik Kotarski (at HNK Gorica until 30 June 2022)
—	DF	NED	Kik Pierie (at FC Twente until 30 June 2022)

== Transfers ==
=== In ===
Date	Pos.	Name	Transferred from	Fee	Ref.
1 July 2021	GK	(Netherlands) Remko Pasveer	(Netherlands) Vitesse	Free transfer	
1 July 2021	GK	(Netherlands) Jay Gorter	(Netherlands) Go Ahead Eagles	€1,000,000	
12 July 2021	FW	(Netherlands) Steven Berghuis	(Netherlands) Feyenoord	€5,500,000	
22 August 2021	FW	(Denmark) Mohamed Daramy	(Denmark) FC Copenhagen	€12,000,000 (Note: Fee may eventually rise to €13,000,000, due to undisclosed bonuses.)	
7 March 2022	GK	(Poland) Przemysław Tytoń	(United States) FC Cincinnati	Free transfer	

=== Out ===
Date	Pos.	Name	Transferred to	Fee	Ref.
30 June 2021	FW	(Burkina Faso) Lassina Traoré	(Ukraine) Shakhtar Donetsk	€10,000,000	
30 June 2021	FW	(Morocco) Oussama Idrissi	(Spain) Sevilla	End of loan	
30 June 2021	MF	(Netherlands) Carel Eiting	(Belgium) Genk	Undisclosed	
1 July 2021	FW	(Netherlands) Brian Brobbey	(Germany) RB Leipzig	Free transfer	
1 July 2021	GK	(Netherlands) Daan Reiziger	(Netherlands) Vitesse	Free transfer	
1 July 2021	DF	(Netherlands) Neraysho Kasanwirjo	(Netherlands) Groningen	Free transfer	
1 July 2021	MF	(Netherlands) Quinten Timber	(Netherlands) Utrecht	Free transfer	
3 July 2021	MF	(United States) Alex Mendez	(Portugal) Vizela	Undisclosed	
16 July 2021	GK	(Netherlands) Kjell Scherpen	(England) Brighton & Hove Albion	€5,000,000	
27 August 2021	MF	(Netherlands) Jurgen Ekkelenkamp	(Germany) Hertha BSC	€3,000,000	
14 January 2022	FW	(Brazil) David Neres	(Ukraine) Shakhtar Donetsk	€12,000,000 (Note: Fee may eventually rise to €16,000,000, due to undisclosed bonuses.)	
31 January 2022	DF	(Netherlands) Julius Dirksen	(Netherlands) Emmen	Free transfer	

=== Loans in ===
Start date	Pos.	Name	From	End date	Fee	Ref.
1 January 2022	FW	(Netherlands) Brian Brobbey	(Germany) RB Leipzig	30 June 2022 (Note: The loan agreement doesn't include a take-over option for Ajax.)	Undisclosed	
28 January 2022	FW	(Ecuador) Patrickson Delgado	(Ecuador) Independiente del Valle	30 June 2023	Undisclosed	
30 January 2022	MF	(Netherlands) Mohamed Ihattaren	(Italy) Juventus	31 December 2022	Undisclosed	

=== Loans out ===
Start date	Pos.	Name	To	End date	Fee	Ref.
1 July 2021	FW	(Burkina Faso) Hassane Bandé	(Croatia) NK Istra 1961	30 June 2022 (Note: The loan agreement includes a take-over option for NK Istra 1961.)	Undisclosed	
1 July 2021	DF	(Netherlands) Kik Pierie	(Netherlands) FC Twente	30 June 2022	Undisclosed	
1 July 2021	GK	(Croatia) Dominik Kotarski	(Croatia) HNK Gorica	30 June 2022	Undisclosed	
31 August 2021	DF	(Argentina) Lisandro Magallán	(Belgium) Anderlecht	30 June 2022 (Note: The loan agreement includes a take-over option for Anderlecht.)	Undisclosed	
1 January 2022	MF	(Netherlands) Max de Waal	(Netherlands) PEC Zwolle	30 June 2022	Undisclosed	
18 January 2022	FW	(Brazil) Giovanni	(Netherlands) SC Telstar	30 June 2022	Undisclosed	
27 January 2022	FW	(Denmark) Eskild Dall	(Denmark) Aarhus GF	30 June 2022	Undisclosed	
31 January 2022	DF	(Netherlands) Terrence Douglas	(Netherlands) FC Den Bosch	30 June 2022	Undisclosed	
1 March 2022	MF	(Denmark) Victor Jensen	(Norway) Rosenborg BK	31 December 2022	Undisclosed	

== Pre-season and friendlies ==
Win Draw Loss Cancelled Fixtures

=== Pre-season ===
3 July 2021 Friendly	Ajax (Netherlands)	6–0	(Netherlands) Koninklijke HFC	Duivendrecht, Netherlands
14:00 CEST (UTC+2)	Neres 19', 21', 23'; Taylor 24'; Danilo 43'; Hlynsson 51'	Report		Stadium: Sportpark De Toekomst; Attendance: 0 Referee: Richard Groenewegen

6 July 2021 Friendly	Quick '20 (Netherlands)	1–1	(Netherlands) Ajax	Oldenzaal, Netherlands
18:00 CEST (UTC+2)	Wevers 80', (yellow card) 86'; Demir (yellow card) 85'	Report	Kudus 45+4'	Stadium: Sportpark Vondersweijde; Attendance: 1,400; Referee: Shona Shukrula

10 July 2021 Friendly	Ajax (Netherlands)	4–1	(Germany) SC Paderborn	Oldenzaal, Netherlands
12:00 CEST (UTC+2)	Haller 16'; Kudus 38'; Danilo 57'; Labyad (penalty missed) 78', 78'	Report	Hünemeier 66'	Stadium: Sportpark Vondersweijde; Referee: Martin van den Kerkhof

16 July 2021 Friendly	Anderlecht (Belgium)	0–2	(Netherlands) Ajax	Brussels, Belgium
19:30 CEST (UTC+2)		Report	Haller 7', 55'; Magallán (yellow card) 90+2'	Stadium: Lotto Park; Attendance: 6,000; Referee: Simon Bourdeaud'hui (Belgium)

24 July 2021 Friendly	Bayern Munich (Germany)	2–2	(Netherlands) Ajax	Munich, Germany
16:30 CEST (UTC+2)	Choupo-Moting 40'; Nianzou 48'; Lawrence (yellow card) 89'	Report	Labyad 10'; Jensen 50'	Stadium: Allianz Arena; Attendance: 8,500; Referee: Tobias Reichel (Germany)

31 July 2021 Friendly	RB Leipzig (Germany)	1–1	(Netherlands) Ajax	Grödig, Austria
16:00 CEST (UTC+2)	Nkunku 54'; Mukiele (yellow card) 89'	Report	Tadić 4'; Schuurs (yellow card) 78'; Taylor (yellow card) 80'	Stadium: Untersberg-Arena; Attendance: 820; Referee: Christopher Jäger (Austria)

4 August 2021 Friendly	Ajax XI (Netherlands)	3–1	(England) Leeds United XI	Duivendrecht, Netherlands
14:00 CEST (UTC+2)	De Waal 13'; Rasmussen 25'; Hlynsson 49'; Salah-Eddine (yellow card) 75'	Report	Dean 90' (pen.); Summerville (yellow card) 69'	Stadium: Sportpark De Toekomst; Attendance: 0

4 August 2021 Friendly	Ajax (Netherlands)	4–0	(England) Leeds United	Amsterdam, Netherlands
20:15 CEST (UTC+2)	Klaassen 2'; Schuurs 28'; Gravenberch 43'; Danilo 85'	Report		Stadium: Johan Cruyff Arena (roof closed); Attendance: 25,000; Referee: Kevin Blom

=== On-season ===
15 August 2021 Friendly	Ajax (Netherlands)	2–0	(Netherlands) Heracles Almelo	Duivendrecht, Netherlands
	Danilo 12'; Labyad 34'	Report		Stadium: Sportpark De Toekomst; Attendance: 0

2 September 2021 Friendly	AZ (Netherlands)	2–1	(Netherlands) Ajax	Wijdewormer, Netherlands
	Midtsjø 75'; Taabouni 83'	Report	Warmerdam 65'	Stadium: AFAS Trainingscomplex; Attendance: 0 Referee: Romano Vorm

10 November 2021 Friendly	Ajax (Netherlands)	3–0	(Netherlands) Sparta Rotterdam	Duivendrecht, Netherlands
	Giovanni 6'; Schuurs 40'; Van Axel Dongen 75'	Report		Stadium: Sportpark De Toekomst; Attendance: 0

9 January 2022 Friendly	Hajduk Split (Croatia)	v	(Netherlands) Ajax	Algarve, Portugal
14:30 CEST (UTC+2)		Report		Stadium: Estádio Algarve

26 January 2022 Friendly	Ajax (Netherlands)	0–1	(Netherlands) FC Utrecht	Duivendrecht, Netherlands
12:30 CEST (UTC+2)		Report	Sylla 39'	Stadium: Sportpark De Toekomst; Attendance: 0 Referee: Ingmar Oostrom

28 February 2022 Friendly	Ajax (Netherlands)	5–1	(Netherlands) Heracles Almelo	Duivendrecht, Netherlands
12:00 CEST (UTC+2)	Danilo 5'; Kudus 11', 87'; Jensen 33'; Taylor 65'	Report	Sierra 63'	Stadium: Sportpark De Toekomst; Attendance: 0

=== Post-season ===
20 May 2022 Friendly	Curaçao	1–5	(Netherlands) Ajax	Willemstad, Curaçao
20:00 AST (UTC−4)	Bacuna 27'	Report	Ihattaren 29'; Rasmussen 32', 45', 67', 83'	Stadium: Ergilio Hato Stadium

== Competitions ==
=== Overall record ===
Competition	First match	Last match	Starting round	Final position	Record							
Competition	First match	Last match	Starting round	Final position	Pld	W	D	L	GF	GA	GD	Win %
Eredivisie	14 August 2021	15 May 2022	Matchday 1	Winners	34	26	5	3	98	19	+79	76.47
KNVB Cup	15 December 2021	17 April 2022	Second round	Runners-up	5	4	0	1	21	2	+19	80.00
Johan Cruyff Shield	7 August 2021		Final	Runners-up	1	0	0	1	0	4	−4	0.00
UEFA Champions League	15 September 2021	15 March 2022	Group stage	Round of 16	8	6	1	1	22	8	+14	75.00
Total					48	36	6	6	141	33	+108	75.00

Last updated: 15 May 2022
Source: Soccerway

=== Eredivisie ===
==== League table ====
Pos	Team	Pld	W	D	L	GF	GA	GD	Pts	Qualification or relegation
1	Ajax (C)	34	26	5	3	98	19	+79	83	Qualification for the Champions League group stage
2	PSV Eindhoven	34	26	3	5	86	42	+44	81	Qualification for the Champions League third qualifying round
3	Feyenoord	34	22	5	7	76	34	+42	71	Qualification for the Europa League group stage (Note: Since the winners of the 2021–22 KNVB Cup, PSV, qualified for the Champions League based on their league position, the Europa League play-off berth awarded to the KNVB Cup winners was transferred to the third-placed team Feyenoord, the highest-placed team not qualified for the Champions League. Feyenoord qualified for the Europa League group stage as their opponent in the 2022 UEFA Europa Conference League final, Roma, qualified to the Europa League group stage through domestic performance by finishing sixth in the Serie A.)
4	Twente	34	20	8	6	55	37	+18	68	Qualification for the Europa Conference League third qualifying round
5	AZ (O)	34	18	7	9	64	44	+20	61	Qualification for the European competition play-offs

Source: Eredivisie
Rules for classification: Season in progress: 1) Most points won; 2) Less points lost; 3) Goal difference; 4) Goals scored; 5) Alphabetical order; End of season: 1) Points; 2) Goal difference; 3) Goals scored; 4) Head-to-head points; 5) Head-to-head goal difference; 6) Head-to-head away goals scored; 7) Play-off if relevant for deciding champion, relegation or participating in a European league, otherwise by draw. 8) Penalty shoot-out (only after a play-off)
(C) Champions; (O) Play-off winners

==== Results summary ====
Overall								Home						Away					
Pld	W	D	L	GF	GA	GD	Pts	W	D	L	GF	GA	GD	W	D	L	GF	GA	GD
34	26	5	3	98	19	+79	83	14	1	2	62	8	+54	12	4	1	36	11	+25

Last updated: 15 May 2022.
Source: Eredivisie

==== Results by round ====
Round	1	2	3	4	5	6	7	8	9	10	11	12	13	14	15	16	17	18	19	20	21	22	23	24	25	26	27	28	29	30	31	32	33	34
Ground	H	A	H	A	H	A	H	H	A	H	A	H	A	A	H	H	A	H	A	A	H	H	A	A	H	A	H	A	H	A	H	A	H	A
Result	W	D	W	W	W	W	W	L	W	W	D	D	W	W	W	L	W	W	W	W	W	W	W	L	W	W	W	W	W	W	W	D	W	D
Position	1	4	2	2	1	1	1	1	1	1	1	1	1	1	1	2	2	2	2	1	1	1	1	1	1	1	1	1	1	1	1	1	1	1

Updated to match(es) played on 15 May 2022. Source: Eredivisie
A = Away; H = Home; W = Win; D = Draw; L = Loss

==== Matches ====
The league fixtures were announced on 11 June 2021.

14 August 2021 1	Ajax	5–0	N.E.C.	Amsterdam
21:00 CEST (UTC+2)	Haller 5'; Mazraoui 9'; Van Rooij 14' (o.g.); Tadić 19', 38'	Report		Stadium: Johan Cruyff Arena (roof open); Attendance: 32,275; Referee: Bas Nijhuis

22 August 2021 2	FC Twente	1–1	Ajax	Enschede
12:15 CEST (UTC+2)	Menig (yellow card) 10'; Pröpper 87'	Report	Klaassen (yellow card) 17'; Haller 52', (yellow card) 55'	Stadium: De Grolsch Veste; Attendance: 20,000; Referee: Dennis Higler

29 August 2021 3	Ajax	5–0	Vitesse	Amsterdam
14:30 CEST (UTC+2)	Antony 5'; Álvarez 31'; Gravenberch 43'; Hájek 60' (o.g.); Klaassen 67'	Report	Bazoer (yellow card) 41'; Oroz (yellow card) 85'	Stadium: Johan Cruyff Arena (roof open); Attendance: 36,816; Referee: Danny Makkelie

11 September 2021 4	PEC Zwolle	0–2	Ajax	Zwolle
18:45 CEST (UTC+2)	Redan (yellow card) 49'	Report	Antony (yellow card) 26'; Haller 28', 67'; Gravenberch (yellow card) 51'; Mazraoui (yellow card) 78'	Stadium: MAC³PARK Stadion; Attendance: 9,000; Referee: Jeroen Manschot

18 September 2021 5	Ajax	9–0	SC Cambuur	Amsterdam
20:00 CEST (UTC+2)	Timber 16'; Berghuis 19'; Mazraoui 29'; Neres 38', 84'; Tadić 60'; Daramy 64'; Haller 67'; Danilo 76'	Report		Stadium: Johan Cruyff Arena (roof open); Attendance: 36,711; Referee: Sander van der Eijk

21 September 2021 6	Fortuna Sittard	0–5	Ajax	Sittard
18:45 CEST (UTC+2)	Janssen (yellow card) 49'	Report	Berghuis 11'; Mazraoui 27'; Tadić 38'; Kudus 72'; Tagliafico 77'	Stadium: Fortuna Sittard Stadion; Attendance: 8,333; Referee: Jochem Kamphuis

25 September 2021 7	Ajax	3–0	FC Groningen	Amsterdam
18:45 CEST (UTC+2)	Álvarez 40'; Antony 56'; Mazraoui 81'	Report	Suslov (yellow card) 36'	Stadium: Johan Cruyff Arena (roof open); Attendance: 53,148; Referee: Pol van Boekel

3 October 2021 8	Ajax	0–1	FC Utrecht	Amsterdam
14:30 CEST (UTC+2)	Gravenberch (yellow card) 50'	Report	Van der Maarel (yellow card) 38'; Paes (yellow card) 63'; Maher (yellow card) 67'; Warmerdam 77'; Timber (yellow card) 79'	Stadium: Johan Cruyff Arena (roof closed); Attendance: 52,621; Referee: Bas Nijhuis

16 October 2021 9	SC Heerenveen	0–2	Ajax	Heerenveen
18:45 CEST (UTC+2)	Madsen (yellow card) 55'; Kaib (yellow card) 61'; Van Ewijk (yellow card) 90'; Van Beek (yellow card) 90+2'	Report	Haller 24'; Neres 75'	Stadium: Abe Lenstra Stadion; Attendance: 25,133; Referee: Danny Makkelie

24 October 2021 10	Ajax	5–0	PSV	Amsterdam
16:45 CEST (UTC+2)	Berghuis 19'; Álvarez (yellow card) 24'; Martínez (yellow card) 29'; Haller 56'; Antony 66'; Klaassen 76'; Tadić 90+2'	Report	Max (yellow card) 36'; Carlos Vinícius (yellow card) 69'	Stadium: Johan Cruyff Arena (roof open); Attendance: 53,585; Referee: Serdar Gözübüyük

30 October 2021 11	Heracles Almelo	0–0	Ajax	Almelo
18:45 CEST (UTC+2)	Bakboord (yellow card) 11'; Quagliata (yellow card) 38'; Rente (yellow card) 58'; Burgzorg (yellow card) 75'	Report	Haller (yellow card) 80'	Stadium: Erve Asito; Attendance: 12,080; Referee: Jeroen Manschot

7 November 2021 12	Ajax	0–0	Go Ahead Eagles	Amsterdam
20:00 CET (UTC+1)	Martínez (yellow card) 42'; Álvarez (yellow card) 49'	Report	Lucassen (yellow card) 90'	Stadium: Johan Cruyff Arena (roof open); Attendance: 53,497; Referee: Rob Dieperink

21 November 2021 13	RKC Waalwijk	0–5	Ajax	Waalwijk
16:45 CET (UTC+1)	Gaari (yellow card) 85'	Report	Haller 17', 83'; Berghuis 42', 57'; Timber 74'	Stadium: Mandemakers Stadion; Attendance: 0 Referee: Allard Lindhout

28 November 2021 14	Sparta Rotterdam	0–1	Ajax	Rotterdam
12:15 CET (UTC+1)	Smeets (yellow card) 90+5'; Engels (yellow card) 90+5'	Report	Tadić 36'; Neres (yellow card) 90+4'	Stadium: Sparta Stadion Het Kasteel; Attendance: 0 Referee: Jochem Kamphuis

2 December 2021 15	Ajax	5–0	Willem II	Amsterdam
21:00 CET (UTC+1)	Antony 15', 23'; Martínez 18'; Klaassen 71'; Danilo 76'	Report	Saddiki (yellow card) 56'; Yeboah (yellow card) 89'; Köhn (yellow card) 89'	Stadium: Johan Cruyff Arena (roof open); Attendance: 0 Referee: Edwin van de Graaf

12 December 2021 16	Ajax	1–2	AZ	Amsterdam
16:45 CET (UTC+1)	Martínez (yellow card) 32'; Haller 73'; Gravenberch (yellow card) 90+2'	Report	Pavlidis 50'; Wijndal (yellow card) 69'; Aboukhlal 83'	Stadium: Johan Cruyff Arena (roof closed); Attendance: 0 Referee: Bas Nijhuis

19 December 2021 17	Feyenoord	0–2	Ajax	Rotterdam
14:30 CET (UTC+1)	Linssen (yellow card) 13'; Toornstra (yellow card) 37'; Aursnes (yellow card) 51'; Nelson (yellow card) 80'	Report	Gravenberch (yellow card) 15'; Haller (yellow card) 32'; Antony (yellow card) 34'; Senesi 44' (o.g.); Tadić 81' (pen.)	Stadium: De Kuip; Attendance: 0 Referee: Dennis Higler

22 December 2021 18	Ajax	5–0	Fortuna Sittard	Amsterdam
21:00 CET (UTC+1)	Blind 14'; Antony 22'; Rensch 82'; Haller 90', 90+3'	Report	van Osch (yellow card) 90+3'	Stadium: Johan Cruyff Arena (roof open); Attendance: 0 Referee: Marc Nagtegaal

16 January 2022 19	FC Utrecht	0–3	Ajax	Utrecht
12:15 CET (UTC+1)	Maher (yellow card) 21'; Boussaid (yellow card) 45+1'	Report	Antony 5'; Brobbey 19', 45+2'; Mazraoui (yellow card) 65'	Stadium: Stadion Galgenwaard; Attendance: 0 Referee: Serdar Gözübüyük

23 January 2022 20	PSV	1–2	Ajax	Eindhoven
14:30 CET (UTC+1)	Obispo (yellow card) 27'; Götze 53'; Mauro (yellow card) 79'; Gutiérrez (yellow card) 82'	Report	Álvarez (yellow card) 24'; Brobbey 34'; Mazraoui 74'	Stadium: Philips Stadion; Attendance: 0 Referee: Danny Makkelie

6 February 2022 21	Ajax	3–0	Heracles Almelo	Amsterdam
16:45 CET (UTC+1)	Álvarez (yellow card) 7'; Antony (yellow card) 11'; Klaassen 22'; Haller 55'; Taylor 65'; Tadić (penalty missed) 88'	Report	Sierhuis (yellow card) 73'; Bakboord (yellow card) 80'	Stadium: Johan Cruyff Arena (roof closed); Attendance: 14,000; Referee: Jeroen Manschot

13 February 2022 22	Ajax	5–0	FC Twente	Amsterdam
16:45 CET (UTC+1)	Klaassen 31'; Tadić (yellow card) 41', (penalty missed) 62'; Haller 53', 85', 88'; Pröpper 77' (o.g.)	Report	Rots (yellow card) 54'	Stadium: Johan Cruyff Arena (roof open); Attendance: 17,859; Referee: Allard Lindhout

19 February 2022 23	Willem II	0–1	Ajax	Tilburg
18:45 CET (UTC+1)	Crowley (yellow card) 34'	Report	Timber 81'	Stadium: Koning Willem II Stadion; Attendance: 14,412; Referee: Pol van Boekel

27 February 2022 24	Go Ahead Eagles	2–1	Ajax	Deventer
16:45 CET (UTC+1)	Córdoba 18'; Martina (yellow card) 41'; Rommens 45+3'	Report	Berghuis 64'	Stadium: De Adelaarshorst; Attendance: 9,200; Referee: Jochem Kamphuis

6 March 2022 25	Ajax	3–2	RKC Waalwijk	Amsterdam
16:45 CET (UTC+1)	Martínez (yellow card) 15'; Haller 33', 37'; Rensch (yellow card) 53'; Tadić 90' (pen.), (yellow card) 90+4'	Report	Kramer 50'; Van der Venne 57'; Anita (yellow card) 90+3'	Stadium: Johan Cruyff Arena (roof open); Attendance: 53,467; Referee: Dennis Higler

11 March 2022 26	SC Cambuur	2–3	Ajax	Leeuwarden
20:00 CET (UTC+1)	Boere (yellow card) 19'; Kallon 48'; Maulun (yellow card) 59'; Joosten 79'	Report	Tadić 3'; Haller 40', (yellow card) 71'; Gravenberch 90+2'	Stadium: Cambuur Stadion; Attendance: 9,822; Referee: Allard Lindhout

20 March 2022 27	Ajax	3–2	Feyenoord	Amsterdam
14:30 CET (UTC+1)	Haller 24'; Tadić 78'; Antony 86', (yellow card) 87' (yellow-red card) 90+4'; Klaassen (yellow card) 90+6'	Report	Sinisterra 8'; Til 28'	Stadium: Johan Cruyff Arena (roof open); Attendance: 54,709; Referee: Danny Makkelie

2 April 2022 28	FC Groningen	1–3	Ajax	Groningen
16:30 CEST (UTC+2)	Strand Larsen 20'	Report	Klaassen 45+1'; Tadić 45+7' (pen.); Berghuis 90+1'	Stadium: Hitachi Capital Mobility Stadion; Attendance: 22,525; Referee: Bas Nijhuis

9 April 2022 29	Ajax	2–1	Sparta Rotterdam	Amsterdam
20:00 CEST (UTC+2)	Klaassen 49'; Tadić 62' (pen.)	Report	De Kamps 33', (yellow card) 50'; Auassar (yellow card) 61'; Engels (yellow card) 64'	Stadium: Johan Cruyff Arena (roof open); Attendance: 54,254; Referee: Pol van Boekel

23 April 2022 30	N.E.C.	0–1	Ajax	Nijmegen
16:30 CEST (UTC+2)	Schöne (yellow card) 55'; Guth (yellow card) 59'	Report	Tadić (penalty missed) 34'; Blind (yellow card) 53'; Brobbey 88'	Stadium: Goffertstadion; Attendance: 12,390; Referee: Jeroen Manschot

30 April 2022 31	Ajax	3–0	PEC Zwolle	Amsterdam
18:45 CEST (UTC+2)	Tadić 30'; Klaassen 51', 80'	Report		Stadium: Johan Cruyff Arena (roof open); Attendance: 54,102; Referee: Rob Dieperink

8 May 2022 32	AZ	2–2	Ajax	Alkmaar
16:45 CEST (UTC+2)	Pavlidis 62', (yellow card) 90+2'; Clasie (yellow card) 72'; Evjen 75'; Wijndal (yellow card) 90+5'	Report	Brobbey 42'; Klaassen (yellow card) 78'; Álvarez 86'	Stadium: AFAS Stadion; Attendance: 18,033; Referee: Dennis Higler

11 May 2022 33	Ajax	5–0	SC Heerenveen	Amsterdam
20:00 CEST (UTC+2)	Tagliafico 19'; Berghuis 33'; Haller 38' (pen.); Brobbey 85'; Álvarez 90+1'	Report		Stadium: Johan Cruyff Arena (roof open); Attendance: 54,335; Referee: Allard Lindhout

15 May 2022 34	Vitesse	2–2	Ajax	Arnhem
14:30 CEST (UTC+2)	Openda 52', 56'	Report	Brobbey 15'; Álvarez (yellow card) 24', (goal) 87'; Blind (yellow card) 73'; Klaassen (yellow card) 76'	Stadium: GelreDome; Attendance: 18,920; Referee: Bas Nijhuis

=== KNVB Cup ===
15 December 2021 Second round	Ajax	4–0	BVV Barendrecht	Amsterdam
21:00 CET (UTC+1)	Taylor 10'; Danilo 12' (pen.), 49'; Hlynsson 89' (pen.)	Report	Jongman (yellow card) 40'	Stadium: Johan Cruyff Arena (roof open); Attendance: 0 Referee: Joey Kooij

20 January 2022 Round of 16	Ajax	9–0	Excelsior Maassluis	Amsterdam
21:00 CET (UTC+1)	Tagliafico 9'; Danilo 21' (pen.), 26', 37', 55'; Regeer 41'; Hlynsson 64'; Daramy 66', 84'	Report	Abbas (yellow card) 31'; Urbanus (yellow card) 75'	Stadium: Johan Cruyff Arena (roof closed); Attendance: 0 Referee: Sander van der Eijk

9 February 2022 Quarter-Finals	Ajax	5–0	Vitesse	Amsterdam
19:00 CET (UTC+1)	Antony 17', 62'; Haller 30', 46'; Tadić 51'	Report	Wittek (yellow card) 53'	Stadium: Johan Cruyff Arena (roof closed); Attendance: 15,403; Referee: Bas Nijhuis

3 March 2022 Semi-Finals	AZ	0–2	Ajax	Alkmaar
20:00 CET (UTC+1)	Hatzidiakos (yellow card) 27'; Clasie (yellow card) 71'	Report	Berghuis 11'; Haller (yellow card) 37'; Blind (yellow card) 74'; Klaassen 89'	Stadium: AFAS Stadium; Attendance: 15,802; Referee: Serdar Gözübüyük

17 April 2022 Final	PSV	2–1	Ajax	Rotterdam
18:00 CEST (UTC+2)	Gutiérrez 48'; Gakpo 50'; Max (yellow card) 63'; Teze (yellow card) 88'; Götze (yellow card) 90+3'	Report	Martínez (yellow card) 18'; Gravenberch 23', (yellow card) 81'	Stadium: De Kuip; Attendance: 47,500; Referee: Danny Makkelie

=== Johan Cruyff Shield ===
7 August 2021 Final	Ajax	0–4	PSV	Amsterdam
20:00 CEST (UTC+2)	Klaassen (yellow card) 31'; Tagliafico (red card) 40'	Report	Madueke 2', 29'; Zahavi (yellow card) 31'; Teze (yellow card) 73'; Vertessen 76'; Götze 89'	Stadium: Johan Cruyff Arena (roof closed); Attendance: 25,000; Referee: Björn Kuipers

=== UEFA Champions League ===
==== Group stage ====
The draw for the group stage was held on 26 August 2021.

Pos	Team	Pld	W	D	L	GF	GA	GD	Pts	Qualification	AJX	SPO	DOR	BES
1	(Netherlands) Ajax	6	6	0	0	20	5	+15	18	Advance to knockout phase	—	4–2	4–0	2–0
2	(Portugal) Sporting CP	6	3	0	3	14	12	+2	9 (Note: Tied on head-to-head points. Head-to-head goal difference: Sporting CP +1, Borussia Dortmund −1.)	Advance to knockout phase	1–5	—	3–1	4–0
3	(Germany) Borussia Dortmund	6	3	0	3	10	11	−1	9	Transfer to Europa League	1–3	1–0	—	5–0
4	(Turkey) Beşiktaş	6	0	0	6	3	19	−16	0		1–2	1–4	1–2	—

Source: UEFA
Rules for classification: Group stage tiebreakers
Notes:

15 September 2021 1	Sporting CP (Portugal)	1–5	(Netherlands) Ajax	Lisbon, Portugal
21:00 CEST (UTC+2)	Paulinho 33'; Palhinha (yellow card) 41'; Tomás (yellow card) 83'; Feddal (yellow card) 84'	Report	Haller 2', 9', 51', 63'; Berghuis 39'; Timber (yellow card) 45+1'; Álvarez (yellow card) 49'; Martínez (yellow card) 86'	Stadium: Estádio José Alvalade; Attendance: 20,382; Referee: José María Sánchez Martínez (Spain)

28 September 2021 2	Ajax (Netherlands)	2–0	(Turkey) Beşiktaş	Amsterdam, Netherlands
18:45 CEST (UTC+2)	Berghuis 17'; Haller 43'	Report	Yalçın (yellow card) 63'; Bozdoğan (yellow card) 75'; Batshuayi (yellow card) 90+3'	Stadium: Johan Cruyff Arena (roof open); Attendance: 52,628; Referee: Benoît Bastien (France)

19 October 2021 3	Ajax (Netherlands)	4–0	(Germany) Borussia Dortmund	Amsterdam, Netherlands
21:00 CEST (UTC+2)	Reus 11' (o.g.); Blind 25'; Álvarez (yellow card) 33'; Antony 57'; Haller 72'; Timber (yellow card) 90+2'	Report	Witsel (yellow card) 42'	Stadium: Johan Cruyff Arena (roof open); Attendance: 54,029; Referee: Jesús Gil Manzano (Spain)

3 November 2021 4	Borussia Dortmund (Germany)	1–3	(Netherlands) Ajax	Dortmund, Germany
21:00 CET (UTC+1)	Hummels (red card) 29'; Reus 37' (pen.); Knauff (yellow card) 79'	Report	Álvarez (yellow card) 39'; Tadić 72'; Haller 83'; Klaassen 90+3'	Stadium: Westfalenstadion; Attendance: 54,820; Referee: Michael Oliver (England)

24 November 2021 5	Beşiktaş (Turkey)	1–2	(Netherlands) Ajax	Istanbul, Turkey
18:45 CET (UTC+1)	Ghezzal 22' (pen.); Larin (yellow card) 88'	Report	Haller 54', 69', (yellow card) 85'	Stadium: Vodafone Park; Attendance: 11,712; Referee: Irfan Peljto (Bosnia and Herzegovina)

7 December 2021 6	Ajax (Netherlands)	4–2	(Portugal) Sporting CP	Amsterdam, Netherlands
21:00 CET (UTC+1)	Haller 8' (pen.); Antony 42'; Schuurs (yellow card) 44'; Álvarez (yellow card) 54'; Neres 58'; Berghuis 62'	Report	Bragança (yellow card) 7'; Santos 22'; Tabata (yellow card) 35', (goal) 78'	Stadium: Johan Cruyff Arena (roof closed); Attendance: 0 Referee: Davide Massa (Italy)

==== Knockout phase ====
===== Round of 16 =====
23 February 2022 First leg	Benfica (Portugal)	2–2	(Netherlands) Ajax	Lisbon, Portugal
21:00 CET	Haller 26' (o.g.); Núñez (yellow card) 46'; Ramos (yellow card) 49'; Yaremchuk 72', (yellow card) 72'	Report	Tadić 18'; Mazraoui (yellow card) 23'; Haller 29'; Berghuis (yellow card) 45'; Antony (yellow card) 87'	Stadium: Estádio da Luz; Attendance: 54,760; Referee: Slavko Vinčić (Slovenia)

15 March 2022 Second leg	Ajax (Netherlands)	0–1 (2–3 agg.)	(Portugal) Benfica	Amsterdam, Netherlands
21:00 CET	Timber (yellow card) 83'; Blind (yellow card) 90+4'; Gravenberch (yellow card) 90+4'	Report	Ramos (yellow card) 67'; Núñez 77'	Stadium: Johan Cruyff Arena (roof open); Attendance: 54,066; Referee: Carlos del Cerro Grande (Spain)

== Statistics ==
=== Appearances and goals ===
No.	Pos	Nat	Player	Total		Eredivisie		KNVB Cup Johan Cruyff Shield		Champions League	
No.	Pos	Nat	Player	Apps	Goals	Apps	Goals	Apps	Goals	Apps	Goals
1	GK	(Netherlands) NED	Maarten Stekelenburg	8	0	7	0	1	0	0	0
2	DF	(Netherlands) NED	Jurriën Timber	43	3	29+1	3	5	0	6+2	0
3	DF	(Netherlands) NED	Perr Schuurs	30	0	10+12	0	3+2	0	2+1	0
4	DF	(Mexico) MEX	Edson Álvarez	41	5	28+3	5	3	0	7	0
5	DF	(Suriname) SUR	Sean Klaiber	0	0	0	0	0	0	0	0
6	MF	(Netherlands) NED	Davy Klaassen	44	11	18+13	9	5+1	1	1+6	1
8	MF	(Netherlands) NED	Ryan Gravenberch	41	3	25+4	2	3+1	1	8	0
9	FW	(Brazil) BRA	Danilo	17	8	1+12	2	2+2	6	0	0
10	FW	(Serbia) SRB	Dušan Tadić	45	16	34	13	4	1	7	2
11	FW	(Brazil) BRA	Antony	33	12	21+2	8	3	2	7	2
12	DF	(Morocco) MAR	Noussair Mazraoui	35	5	23+2	5	2	0	8	0
15	DF	(Netherlands) NED	Devyne Rensch	29	1	8+11	1	3+2	0	0+5	0
16	GK	(Netherlands) NED	Jay Gorter	2	0	1	0	1	0	0	0
17	DF	(Netherlands) NED	Daley Blind	46	2	32+2	1	4	0	7+1	1
18	FW	(Netherlands) NED	Brian Brobbey	13	7	4+7	7	1	0	0+1	0
19	MF	(Morocco) MAR	Zakaria Labyad	2	0	0+2	0	0	0	0	0
20	MF	(Ghana) GHA	Mohammed Kudus	20	1	4+12	1	0+2	0	0+2	0
21	DF	(Argentina) ARG	Lisandro Martínez	37	1	23+1	1	5	0	8	0
22	FW	(Ivory Coast) CIV	Sébastien Haller	43	34	31	21	3+1	2	7+1	11
23	FW	(Netherlands) NED	Steven Berghuis	46	12	29+4	8	4+1	1	8	3
24	GK	(Cameroon) CMR	André Onana	10	0	6	0	2	0	2	0
25	MF	(Netherlands) NED	Kenneth Taylor	19	2	5+8	1	2+1	1	0+3	0
27	MF	(Netherlands) NED	Mohamed Ihattaren	1	0	0	0	0+1	0	0	0
30	FW	(Denmark) DEN	Mohamed Daramy	16	3	0+12	1	1+1	2	1+1	0
31	DF	(Argentina) ARG	Nicolás Tagliafico	30	3	9+13	2	3+2	1	1+2	0
32	GK	(Netherlands) NED	Remko Pasveer	28	0	20	0	2	0	6	0
33	GK	(Poland) POL	Przemysław Tytoń	0	0	0	0	0	0	0	0
37	FW	(Netherlands) NED	Naci Ünüvar	2	0	0	0	0+2	0	0	0
38	MF	(Iceland) ISL	Kristian Hlynsson	2	2	0	0	0+2	2	0	0
44	MF	(Netherlands) NED	Youri Regeer	5	1	2+1	0	1+1	1	0	0
46	DF	(Netherlands) NED	Anass Salah-Eddine	1	0	0+1	0	0	0	0	0
53	DF	(Netherlands) NED	Liam van Gelderen	2	0	0+2	0	0	0	0	0
56	FW	(Netherlands) NED	Amourricho van Axel Dongen	3	0	0+1	0	1+1	0	0	0
Players sold or loaned out after the start of the season:
7	FW	(Brazil) BRA	David Neres	22	4	3+12	3	1+1	0	2+3	1
18	MF	(Netherlands) NED	Jurgen Ekkelenkamp	1	0	0	0	0+1	0	0	0
26	MF	(Denmark) DEN	Victor Jensen	2	0	0+1	0	1	0	0	0
28	DF	(Argentina) ARG	Lisandro Magallán	1	0	0	0	0+1	0	0	0

Last updated: 15 May 2022
Source: Competitive matches

=== Goalscorers ===
Rank	No	Pos	Nat	Name	Eredivisie	KNVB Cup Johan Cruyff Shield	Champions League	Total
1	22	FW	(Ivory Coast)	Sébastien Haller	21	2	11	34
2	10	FW	(Serbia)	Dušan Tadić	13	1	2	16
3	11	FW	(Brazil)	Antony	8	2	2	12
3	23	FW	(Netherlands)	Steven Berghuis	8	1	3	12
5	6	MF	(Netherlands)	Davy Klaassen	9	1	1	11
6	9	FW	(Brazil)	Danilo	2	6	0	8
7	18	FW	(Netherlands)	Brian Brobbey	7	0	0	7
8	4	DF	(Mexico)	Edson Álvarez	5	0	0	5
8	12	DF	(Morocco)	Noussair Mazraoui	5	0	0	5
10	7	FW	(Brazil)	David Neres	3	0	1	4
11	2	DF	(Netherlands)	Jurriën Timber	3	0	0	3
11	8	MF	(Netherlands)	Ryan Gravenberch	2	1	0	3
11	30	FW	(Denmark)	Mohamed Daramy	1	2	0	3
11	31	DF	(Argentina)	Nicolás Tagliafico	2	1	0	3
15	17	DF	(Netherlands)	Daley Blind	1	0	1	2
15	25	MF	(Netherlands)	Kenneth Taylor	1	1	0	2
15	38	MF	(Iceland)	Kristian Hlynsson	0	2	0	2
18	15	DF	(Netherlands)	Devyne Rensch	1	0	0	1
18	20	MF	(Ghana)	Mohammed Kudus	1	0	0	1
18	21	DF	(Argentina)	Lisandro Martínez	1	0	0	1
18	44	MF	(Netherlands)	Youri Regeer	0	1	0	1
Own goal					4	0	1	5
Totals					98	21	22	141

Last updated: 15 May 2022
Source: Competitive matches

=== Clean sheets ===
Rank	No	Pos	Nat	Name	Eredivisie	KNVB Cup Johan Cruyff Shield	Champions League	Total
1	32	GK	(Netherlands)	Remko Pasveer	17	1	2	20
2	1	GK	(Netherlands)	Maarten Stekelenburg	5	0	0	5
3	24	GK	(Cameroon)	André Onana	0	2	0	2
4	16	GK	(Netherlands)	Jay Gorter	0	1	0	1
Total					22	4	2	28

Last updated: 15 May 2022
Source: Competitive matches

=== Disciplinary record ===
N	P	Nat.	Name	Eredivisie			KNVB Cup; Johan Cruyff Shield			Champions League			Total			Notes
N	P	Nat.	Name	Yellow card	Second yellow card	Red card	Yellow card	Second yellow card	Red card	Yellow card	Second yellow card	Red card	Yellow card	Second yellow card	Red card	Notes
2	DF	(Netherlands)	Jurriën Timber							3			3			
3	DF	(Netherlands)	Perr Schuurs							1			1			
4	DF	(Mexico)	Edson Álvarez	5						4			9			
6	MF	(Netherlands)	Davy Klaassen	3	1		1						4	1		
7	FW	(Brazil)	David Neres	1						2			3			
8	MF	(Netherlands)	Ryan Gravenberch	4			1			1			6			
10	FW	(Serbia)	Dušan Tadić	2									2			
11	FW	(Brazil)	Antony	4	1					1			5	1		
12	DF	(Morocco)	Noussair Mazraoui	2						1			3			
15	DF	(Netherlands)	Devyne Rensch	1									1			
17	DF	(Netherlands)	Daley Blind	2			1			1			4			
21	DF	(Argentina)	Lisandro Martínez	4			1			1			6			
22	FW	(Ivory Coast)	Sébastien Haller	4			1			1			6			
23	FW	(Netherlands)	Steven Berghuis							1			1			
31	DF	(Argentina)	Nicolás Tagliafico						1						1	

Last updated: 15 May 2022
Source: Competitive matches
Only competitive matches
(yellow card) = Number of bookings; (second yellow card) = Number of sending offs after a second yellow card; (red card) = Number of sending offs by a direct red card.
