= Anass Salah-Eddine =

Moroccan footballer (born 2002)

- Salah-Eddine with Morocco in 2026

Personal information
- Date of birth: 18 January 2002 (age 24)
- Place of birth: Amsterdam, Netherlands
- Height: 1.80 m (5 ft 11 in)
- Positions: Left-back; left wing-back

Team information
- Current team: Panathinaikos (on loan from Roma)
- Number: 5

Youth career
- Blauw-Wit Amsterdam
- RKSV Pancratius
- –2015: Amsterdamsche FC
- 2015–2018: AZ
- 2018–2022: Ajax

Senior career*
Years	Team	Apps	(Gls)
2020–2024	Jong Ajax	35	(2)
2022–2024	Ajax	7	(0)
2022–2023	→ Twente (loan)	14	(0)
2024–2025	Twente	24	(2)
2025–	Roma	3	(0)
2025–2026	→ PSV (loan)	17	(0)
2026–	→ Panathinaikos (loan)	5	(0)

International career^{‡}
2017	Netherlands U15	3	(0)
2017–2018	Netherlands U16	7	(1)
2018–2019	Netherlands U17	23	(1)
2019	Netherlands U18	3	(0)
2023–2025	Netherlands U21	13	(0)
2025–	Morocco	15	(0)
Medal record
Men's football
Representing Morocco
Africa Cup of Nations
Winner	2025 Morocco
Representing Netherlands
UEFA European Under-17 Championship
Winner	2019 Republic of Ireland
- * Club domestic league appearances and goals as of 8 November 2026 ‡ National team caps and goals as of 4 October 2026

Anass Salah-Eddine (Arabic: أنس صلاح الدين; born 18 January 2002) is a professional footballer who plays as a left-back or left wing-back for Super League Greece club Panathinaikos, on loan from Serie A club Roma. Born in the Netherlands, he plays for the Morocco national team.

== Club career ==
Salah-Eddine's youth career started with Jong Ajax in 2018. On 1 August 2022, he signed a contract extension until the end of the 2025 season. He then joined Twente on loan for the 2022–23 season. On 1 February 2024, he joined Twente on a permanent deal until 2027.

On 3 February 2025, Salah-Eddine joined Serie A club Roma.

On 31 August 2025, Salah-Eddine returned to the Netherlands and joined reigning champions PSV, on an initial one-year loan with an option to buy.

== International career ==
Born in the Netherlands, Salah-Eddine is of Moroccan descent with roots in Kalaat M'Gouna. He was a youth international for the Netherlands. On 21 October 2025, his request to switch international allegiance to Morocco was approved by FIFA.

On 11 December 2025, Salah-Eddine was called up to the Morocco squad for the 2025 Africa Cup of Nations.

On 26 May 2026, Salah-Eddine was selected in the 26-man squad for the 2026 FIFA World Cup.

== Career statistics ==
=== Club ===
As of match played 8 November 2026

Appearances and goals by club, season and competition
Club	Season	League			National cup (Note: Includes KNVB Cup, Greek Cup)		Europe		Other		Total	
Club	Season	Division	Apps	Goals	Apps	Goals	Apps	Goals	Apps	Goals	Apps	Goals
Jong Ajax	2019–20	Eerste Divisie	1	0	—		—		0	0	1	0
Jong Ajax	2020–21	Eerste Divisie	3	0	—		—		0	0	3	0
Jong Ajax	2021–22	Eerste Divisie	21	1	0	0	—		0	0	21	1
Jong Ajax	2023–24	Eerste Divisie	9	1	—		—		—		9	1
Jong Ajax	Total		34	2	0	0	—		0	0	34	2
Ajax	2020–21	Eredivisie	1	0	0	0	0	0	0	0	1	0
Ajax	2023–24	Eredivisie	6	0	0	0	2 (Note: Appearances in UEFA Europa League)	0	0	0	8	0
Ajax	Total		7	0	0	0	2	0	0	0	9	0
Twente (loan)	2022–23	Eredivisie	14	0	2	0	1 (Note: Appearance in UEFA Europa Conference League)	0	—		17	0
Twente	2023–24	Eredivisie	6	0	0	0	—		—		6	0
Twente	2024–25	Eredivisie	18	2	1	0	10 (Note: Two appearances in UEFA Champions League, eight appearances in UEFA Europa League)	0	—		29	2
Twente	Total		24	2	1	0	10	0	—		35	2
Roma	2024–25	Serie A	3	0	0	0	0	0	—		3	0
PSV (loan)	2025–26	Eredivisie	17	0	1	0	7 (Note: Appearances in UEFA Champions League)	0	—		25	0
Panathinaikos (loan)	2026–27	Super League Greece	5	0	1	0	0	0	—		6	0
Career total			104	4	5	0	20	0	0	0	129	4

=== International ===
As of match played 4 October 2026

Appearances and goals by national team and year
National team	Year	Apps	Goals
Morocco	2025	4	0
Morocco	2026	11	0
Total		15	0

== Honours ==
PSV

- Eredivisie: 2025–26

Netherlands U17

- UEFA European Under-17 Championship: 2019

Morocco

- Africa Cup of Nations: 2025

Individual

- Eredivisie Team of the Month: October 2024
