= Ar'jany Martha =

Dutch-Curaçaoan footballer (born 2003)

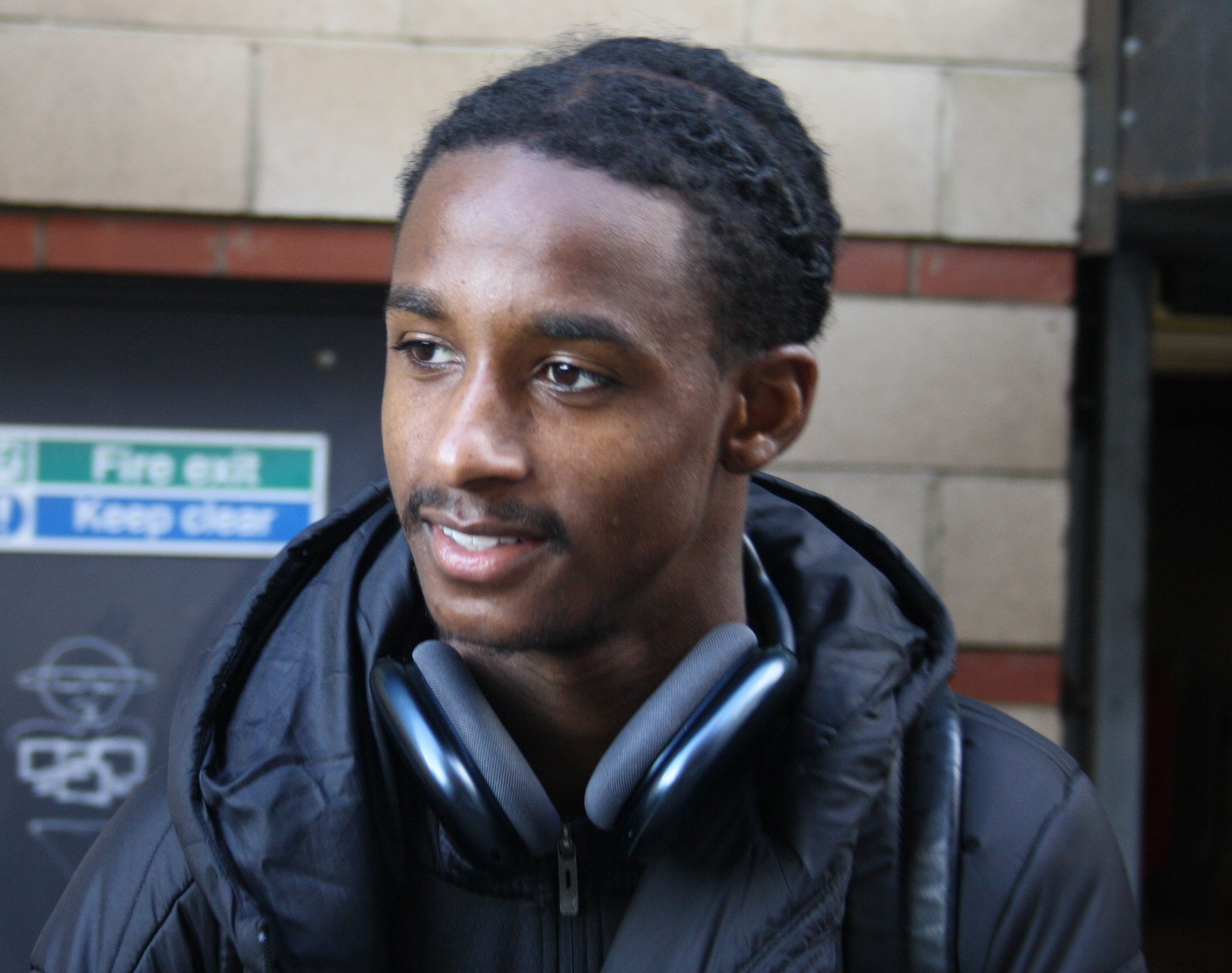
- Martha in 2026

Personal information
- Full name: Ar'jany Jainel Archenir Martha
- Date of birth: 4 September 2003 (age 23)
- Place of birth: Rotterdam, Netherlands
- Height: 1.80 m (5 ft 11 in)
- Positions: Winger; full-back

Team information
- Current team: Telstar (on loan from Rotherham United)
- Number: 42

Youth career
- 2013–2015: Spartaan'20
- 2015–2019: Sparta Rotterdam
- 2019–2020: Ajax

Senior career*
Years	Team	Apps	(Gls)
2020–2024	Jong Ajax	110	(9)
2023–2024	Ajax	9	(0)
2024–2025	Beerschot	18	(0)
2025–	Rotherham United	45	(1)
2026–	→ Telstar (loan)	7	(1)

International career^{‡}
2018	Netherlands U15	2	(0)
2018–2019	Netherlands U16	3	(1)
2019	Netherlands U17	6	(0)
2024–	Curaçao	10	(2)
- * Club domestic league appearances and goals as of 15:08, 14 November 2026 (UTC) ‡ National team caps and goals as of 5 October 2026

Ar'jany Jainel Archenir Martha (born 4 September 2003) is a professional footballer who plays as a winger or full-back for Eredivisie club Telstar, on loan from EFL League Two club Rotherham United. Born in the Netherlands, he plays for the Curaçao national team.

== Club career ==
=== Early career ===
Martha, whose roots lie in Curaçao, played for Spartaan'20 in the south of his native city of Rotterdam from 2013 to 2015. He then moved to the football academy of the professional club Sparta Rotterdam, where he played for four years. Then Martha moved to the Ajax academy. Since the 2020–21 season he has been playing for the second team Jong Ajax in the second-tier Eerste Divisie.

=== Ajax ===
On 2 November 2023, Martha made his debut for senior Ajax team, by starting in a 2–0 win over Volendam. Later that month, he made his European debut, replacing Borna Sosa in the 77th minute of a 4–3 UEFA Europa League loss to Marseille.

=== Beerschot ===
On 31 July 2024, Martha joined Belgian Pro League club Beerschot on a multiple-season contract. He made his debut for the club on 2 August, replacing Thibaud Verlinden in the 81st minute of a 3–1 away loss to Union Saint-Gilloise.

=== Rotherham United ===
On 30 July 2025, Martha joined EFL League One side Rotherham United for an undisclosed fee, signing a three-year contract. He was reported to have arrived for no initial payment, with a five-figure sum falling due based on the number of games he played. Martha made 47 appearances in his first season, which ended in relegation to League Two.

Martha played five times at the start of the 2026–27 season before falling out of the side under new head coach Alex Bruce, Rotherham having made fifteen summer signings. The club received more than £100,000 from FIFA for his involvement in the 2026 FIFA World Cup with Curaçao.

==== Telstar (loan) ====
On 2 September 2026, on the closing day of the Dutch transfer window, Martha joined Eredivisie club Telstar on loan for the rest of the 2026–27 season, with an option to buy. Telstar signed him as a winger, having begun his career as a left-back at Ajax.

== International career ==
=== Netherlands youth ===
Martha was a youth international for the Netherlands.

=== Curaçao ===
On 9 March 2024, it was announced that Martha had been called up by Dick Advocaat to join the Curaçao national team as part of the 23-man squad for the training camp scheduled for 18 to 25 March 2024 in Alanya, Turkey, ahead of the teams 2026 FIFA World Cup qualification campaign in June.

On 18 May 2026, he was named by head coach Dick Advocaat in the 26-man squad for the 2026 FIFA World Cup, marking the country's first-ever appearance at the tournament.

== Career statistics ==
=== Club ===
As of match played 7 November 2026

Appearances and goals by club, season and competition
Club	Season	League			National cup (Note: Includes KNVB Cup, Belgian Cup, FA Cup)		League cup (Note: Includes EFL Cup)		Europe		Other		Total	
Club	Season	Division	Apps	Goals	Apps	Goals	Apps	Goals	Apps	Goals	Apps	Goals	Apps	Goals
Jong Ajax	2020–21	Eerste Divisie	29	3	—		—		—		—		29	3
Jong Ajax	2021–22	Eerste Divisie	28	3	—		—		—		—		28	3
Jong Ajax	2022–23	Eerste Divisie	30	3	—		—		—		—		30	3
Jong Ajax	2023–24	Eerste Divisie	23	0	—		—		—		—		23	0
Jong Ajax	Total		110	9	—		—		—		—		110	9
Ajax	2023–24	Eredivisie	9	0	1	0	—		2 (Note: Appearances in UEFA Europa League)	0	—		12	0
Beerschot	2024–25	Belgian Pro League	17	0	1	0	—		—		—		18	0
Rotherham United	2025-26	EFL League One	41	1	1	0	2	1	—		3 (Note: Appearances in EFL Trophy)	0	47	2
Rotherham United	2026–27	EFL League Two	4	0	0	0	1	0	—		0	0	5	0
Rotherham United	Total		45	1	1	0	3	1	—		3	0	52	2
Telstar (loan)	2026–27	Eredivisie	7	1	0	0	—		—		—		7	1
Career total			188	11	3	0	3	1	2	0	3	0	199	12

=== International ===
As of match played 4 October 2026

Appearances and goals by national team and year
National team	Year	Apps	Goals
Curaçao	2024	4	0
Curaçao	2025	2	1
Curaçao	2026	4	1
Total		10	2

No.	Date	Venue	Opponent	Score	Result	Competition
1	31 March 2026	Melbourne Rectangular Stadium, Melbourne, Australia	Australia	1–1	1–5	2026 FIFA Series
