= Kenneth Taylor (footballer, born 2002) =

Dutch footballer

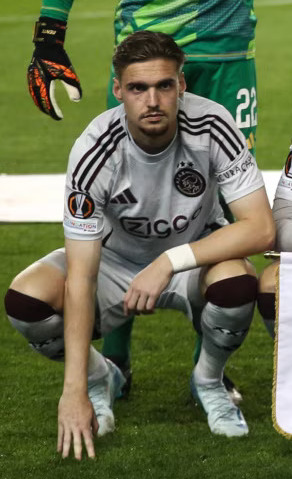
- Taylor playing for Ajax in 2024

Personal information
- Full name: Kenneth Ina Dorothea Taylor
- Date of birth: 16 May 2002 (age 24)
- Place of birth: Alkmaar, Netherlands
- Height: 1.82 m (6 ft 0 in)
- Position: Midfielder

Team information
- Current team: Lazio
- Number: 24

Youth career
- –2010: SV De Foresters
- 2010–2019: Ajax

Senior career*
Years	Team	Apps	(Gls)
2018–2022	Jong Ajax	60	(14)
2020–2026	Ajax	130	(25)
2026–	Lazio	29	(5)

International career^{‡}
2017	Netherlands U15	5	(0)
2017–2018	Netherlands U16	6	(1)
2018–2019	Netherlands U17	14	(4)
2021–2024	Netherlands U21	15	(1)
2022–	Netherlands	6	(0)
Medal record
Representing Netherlands
UEFA European Under-17 Championship
Winner	Ireland 2019	U-17 Team
- * Club domestic league appearances and goals as of 19:29, 21 November 2026 (UTC) ‡ National team caps and goals as of 27 September 2026

Kenneth Ina Dorothea Taylor (born 16 May 2002) is a Dutch professional footballer who plays as a midfielder for Serie A club Lazio and the Netherlands national team.

== Club career ==
=== Early career ===
A product of the Ajax Youth Academy, Taylor joined the club in 2010 from SV De Foresters. He made his professional debut for the reserve team, Jong Ajax, on 15 October 2018, appearing as a 70th-minute substitute for Jasper ter Heide in an Eerste Divisie match against Jong PSV. Over the following seasons, he became a regular fixture for Jong Ajax, eventually captaining the side and scoring 14 goals in 60 appearances by early 2022.

=== Ajax ===
Taylor made his senior debut for AFC Ajax on 12 December 2020 in a 4–0 victory against PEC Zwolle, entering as a 64th-minute substitute for Perr Schuurs. His first-team opportunities remained limited until the latter half of the 2021–22 season under manager Erik ten Hag. On 6 February 2022, he scored his first Eredivisie goal against Heracles Almelo just two minutes after coming off the bench, converting an assist from Sébastien Haller in a 3–0 win. He finished the campaign with 19 appearances, helping Ajax secure the league title. In July 2022, he extended his contract with the club until 2027.

==== Breakthrough and establishment ====
Following the departure of Ryan Gravenberch in the summer of 2022, Taylor became a regular starter in the Ajax midfield during the 2022–23 season. He made 44 appearances across all competitions, contributing 9 goals and 4 assists. His strong performances were recognised when he was named the Eredivisie Talent of the Month for November 2022. At the conclusion of the season, he was awarded the Marco van Basten Award as the Ajax Talent of the Year.

During the 2023–24 season, Taylor remained a key player despite the team's collective struggles and frequent managerial changes. Playing primarily under Maurice Steijn and later John van 't Schip, he recorded 8 goals in 47 appearances. He also scored his first European goals that season, netting twice in the UEFA Europa League and once in the UEFA Europa Conference League.

==== 2024–25: Player of the Year ====
The 2024–25 season under new manager Francesco Farioli proved to be Taylor's most prolific to date. Given a more advanced role in midfield, he displayed improved goalscoring form, finishing the campaign as Ajax's top league scorer with 9 goals in 33 matches. A major highlight of his season came on 2 February 2025 in De Klassieker against rivals Feyenoord, where he scored a dramatic 94th-minute winner to secure a 2–1 victory at the Johan Cruyff Arena. He was also instrumental in Europe, scoring 6 goals during the club's run in the UEFA Europa League. In recognition of his consistent performance, Taylor was named Ajax Player of the Year in May 2025.

==== 2025–26 season ====
In the summer of 2025, Taylor was the subject of a transfer bid from Farioli's new club, Portuguese club FC Porto, which was rejected by Ajax; Taylor subsequently expressed his commitment to the Amsterdam club. He began the 2025–26 season as a starter in the UEFA Champions League, making four appearances in the group stage. However, his progress was interrupted in late 2025 by an injury that ruled him out of action through December.

=== Lazio ===
On 9 January 2026, Taylor signed for Serie A side Lazio until June 2030 for a fee of €15 million in addition to add-ons.

== International career ==
Taylor has represented the Netherlands at various youth levels, beginning with the under-15 team in 2017. He was a member of the Netherlands U17 squad that won the 2019 UEFA European Under-17 Championship. Later that year, he captained the U17s at the 2019 FIFA U-17 World Cup in Brazil. He subsequently progressed to the Netherlands U21 team, earning 15 caps and scoring once between 2021 and 2024, and was included in the squad for the 2023 UEFA European Under-21 Championship in Romania.

Taylor made his senior debut for the Netherlands on 22 September 2022 under manager Louis van Gaal, appearing as a substitute in a 2–0 UEFA Nations League victory over Poland. He was selected for the 2022 FIFA World Cup squad in Qatar, where he made one appearance as a substitute in the final group stage match against the hosts.

On 24 March 2023, Taylor earned his fourth cap in a 4–0 UEFA Euro 2024 qualifying loss to France. He made his next international appearance two years later, coming on as a substitute in the UEFA Nations League Finals quarter-final second leg against Spain on 23 March 2025.

== Career statistics ==
=== Club ===
As of match played 21 November 2026

Appearances and goals by club, season and competition
Club	Season	League			National cup (Note: Includes KNVB Cup, Coppa Italia)		Europe		Other		Total	
Club	Season	Division	Apps	Goals	Apps	Goals	Apps	Goals	Apps	Goals	Apps	Goals
Jong Ajax	2018–19	Eerste Divisie	1	0	—		—		—		1	0
Jong Ajax	2019–20	Eerste Divisie	19	0	—		—		—		19	0
Jong Ajax	2020–21	Eerste Divisie	29	7	—		—		—		29	7
Jong Ajax	2021–22	Eerste Divisie	11	7	—		—		—		11	7
Jong Ajax	Total		60	14	—		—		—		60	14
Ajax	2020–21	Eredivisie	3	0	0	0	0	0	—		3	0
Ajax	2021–22	Eredivisie	13	1	3	1	3 (Note: Appearances in UEFA Champions League)	0	0	0	19	2
Ajax	2022–23	Eredivisie	32	8	3	1	8 (Note: Six appearances in UEFA Champions League, two appearances in UEFA Europa League)	0	1 (Note: Appearance in Johan Cruyff Shield)	0	44	9
Ajax	2023–24	Eredivisie	34	5	1	0	12 (Note: Eight appearances and two goals in UEFA Europa League, four appearances and one goal in UEFA Europa Conference League)	3	—		47	8
Ajax	2024–25	Eredivisie	33	9	2	0	17 (Note: Appearances in UEFA Europa League)	6	—		52	15
Ajax	2025–26	Eredivisie	15	2	0	0	4	0	—		19	2
Ajax	Total		130	25	9	2	44	9	1	0	184	36
Lazio	2025–26	Serie A	17	3	4	0	—		—		21	3
Lazio	2026–27	Serie A	12	2	1	0	—		0	0	13	2
Lazio	Total		29	5	5	0	—		0	0	34	5
Career total			219	44	14	2	44	9	1	0	278	55

=== International ===
As of 27 September 2026

Appearances and goals by national team and year
National team	Year	Apps	Goals
Netherlands	2022	3	0
Netherlands	2023	1	0
Netherlands	2025	1	0
Netherlands	2026	1	0
Total		5	0

== Honours ==
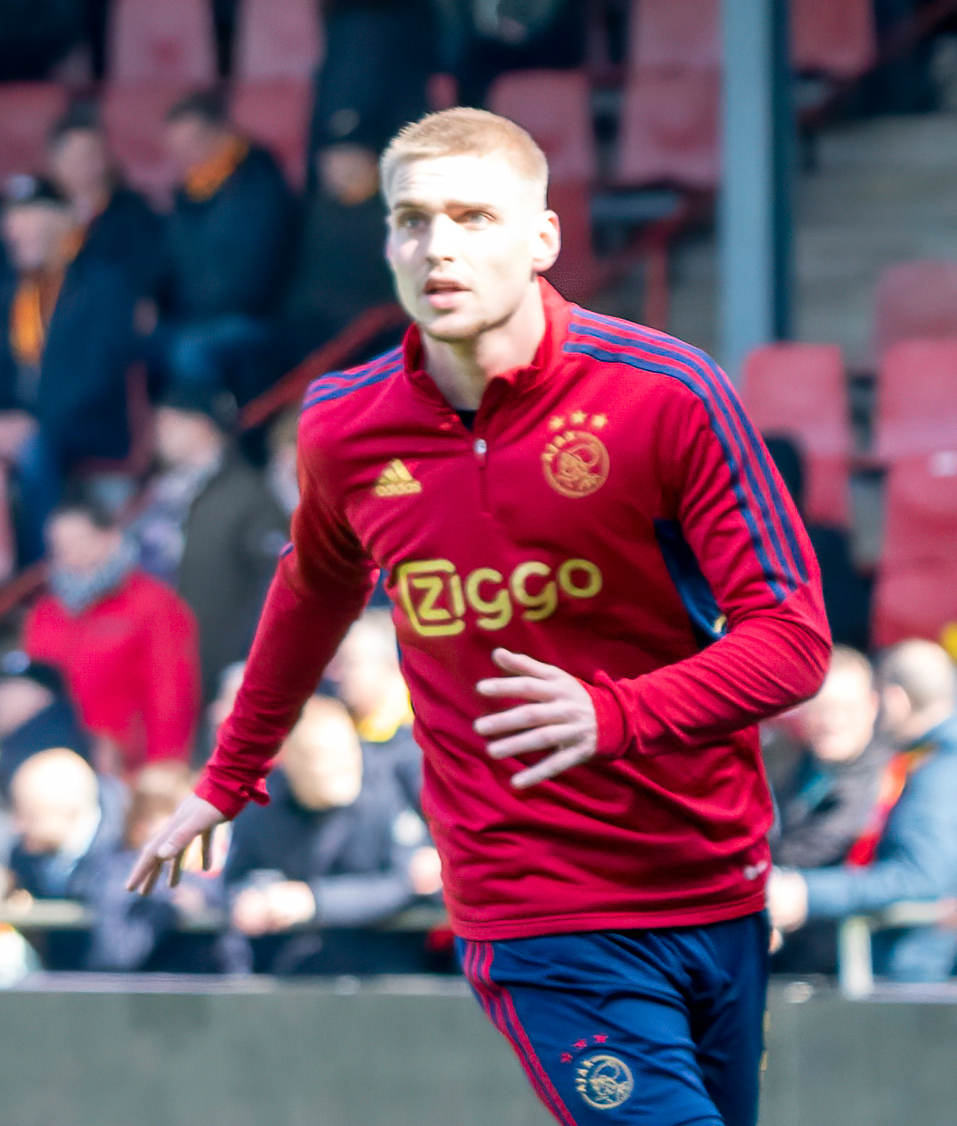
Taylor with Ajax in 2023.

Ajax

- Eredivisie: 2020–21, 2021–22
- KNVB Cup: 2020–21

Netherlands U17

- UEFA European Under-17 Championship: 2019

Individual

- Ajax Player of the Year (Rinus Michels Award): 2024–25
- Ajax Talent of the Year (Marco van Basten Award): 2022–23
- Eredivisie Team of the Month: March 2025
- Eredivisie Talent of the Month: November 2022
