= Jaymillio Pinas =

Dutch footballer (born 2002)

Personal information
- Date of birth: 3 May 2002 (age 24)
- Place of birth: Drachten, Netherlands
- Height: 1.73 m (5 ft 8 in)
- Position: Forward

Team information
- Current team: RKAV Volendam

Youth career
- –2015: Abcoude
- 2015–2017: Volendam
- 2017–2019: Ajax

Senior career*
Years	Team	Apps	(Gls)
2019–2021	Jong Ajax	17	(1)
2022–2023	Dordrecht	35	(3)
2023–2024	VV Katwijk	24	(3)
2024–	RKAV Volendam	2	(0)

International career
2017–2018	Netherlands U16	9	(8)
2018	Netherlands U17	5	(3)
- * Club domestic league appearances and goals as of 22:28, 30 December 2024 (UTC)

Jaymillio Pinas (born 3 May 2002) is a Dutch professional footballer who plays as a forward for RKAV Volendam.

== Club career ==
Pinas began his football career at FC Abcoude and Volendam, where he played until 2017. He then moved to the youth academy of Ajax. In the 2017–18 season he played for the under-17 team, for whom he scored once in two games. In the following season he played for both the U17 and U19 sides and was utilised a total of 24 times, scoring nine goals and making six assists. At the end of the season he won the cup and league double with the under-19s. In 2019–20, he was a regular of the U19 team and also played in the UEFA Youth League, where his team reached the semi-finals. He also made his Eerste Divisie debut against Jong PSV on 16 September 2019, against which he provided an assist for Max de Waal. In the following season he scored his first goal for the team against Helmond Sport on 9 January 2021 and also provided an assist. During the season he established himself as a regular in the Jong Ajax team.

On 28 January 2022, Pinas signed a two-year contract with Dordrecht.

On 30 August 2023, Pinas moved to VV Katwijk in the third-tier Tweede Divisie.

In December 2024, Pinas joined Tweede Divisie side RKAV Volendam.

== International career ==
Born in the Netherlands, Pinas is of Surinamese descent. Pinas is a youth international for the Netherlands.

== Career statistics ==
=== Club ===
As of 10 April 2020.

Club	Season	League			Cup		Continental		Other		Total	
Club	Season	Division	Apps	Goals	Apps	Goals	Apps	Goals	Apps	Goals	Apps	Goals
Jong Ajax	2019–20	Eerste Divisie	1	0	–		–		0	0	1	0
Career total			1	0	0	0	0	0	0	0	1	0
