= Maxime De Bie =

Belgian footballer

Personal information
- Date of birth: 13 December 2000 (age 25)
- Place of birth: Hove, Belgium
- Height: 1.89 m (6 ft 2 in)
- Position: Defender

Youth career
- 2009–2012: Lyra
- 2012–2015: Lierse
- 2015–2020: Mechelen

Senior career*
Years	Team	Apps	(Gls)
2020–2022	Mechelen	0	(0)
2020–2022	→ Helmond Sport (loan)	49	(1)
2022–2023	Lierse Kempenzonen	1	(0)

International career^{‡}
2017	Belgium U17	9	(0)
2017–2018	Belgium U18	4	(0)
2018	Belgium U19	5	(0)
- * Club domestic league appearances and goals as of 15 June 2023 ‡ National team caps and goals as of 13:17, 15 September 2020 (UTC)

Maxime De Bie (born 13 December 2000) is a Belgian professional footballer who plays as a defender.

== Career ==
De Bie was sent on a season-long loan to Helmond Sport on 15 August 2020 as part of a new cooperation agreement between his club Mechelen and Helmond Sport. He made his professional debut in on 29 August 2020, in the 2–1 away win over TOP Oss. He came on for Lance Duijvestijn in the 83rd minute. He scored his first goal on 2 January 2021 in a 5–2 win over FC Dordrecht; a header off a corner from Karim Loukili.

In July 2021, De Bie's loan deal with Helmond Sport was extended by another year, keeping him in North Brabant until 2022.

On 12 May 2022, De Bie signed a one-season contract with Lierse Kempenzonen.

== Personal life ==
De Bie has worked as a fashion photographer next to being as a professional footballer, taking photos for his mother's online shop.

== Career statistics ==
=== Club ===
As of 3 October 2021.

Club	Season	League			Cup		Continental		Other		Total	
Club	Season	Division	Apps	Goals	Apps	Goals	Apps	Goals	Apps	Goals	Apps	Goals
Mechelen	2020–21	Jupiler Pro League	0	0	0	0	–		0	0	0	0
Helmond Sport (loan)	2020–21	Eerste Divisie	22	1	1	0	–		0	0	21	1
Helmond Sport (loan)	2021–22	Eerste Divisie	9	0	0	0	–		–		9	0
Helmond Sport (loan)	Total		31	1	1	0	0	0	0	0	32	1
Career total			31	1	1	0	0	0	0	0	32	1
