= Steve Tunga =

German footballer (born 1997)

Personal information
- Full name: Steve Tunga Malanda
- Date of birth: 8 March 1997 (age 29)
- Place of birth: Essen, Germany
- Height: 1.70 m (5 ft 7 in)
- Position: Midfielder

Team information
- Current team: SG Wattenscheid 09
- Number: 26

Youth career
- –2011: Essener SG
- 2011–2015: VfL Bochum

Senior career*
Years	Team	Apps	(Gls)
2015–2017	Rot-Weiß Oberhausen	2	(0)
2017–2019	SG Wattenscheid 09	47	(3)
2019–2020	Borussia Dortmund II	18	(0)
2020–2022	Almere City	17	(0)
2022–2023	SG Wattenscheid 09	19	(1)
2023–2024	Wuppertaler SV	17	(0)
2025–	SG Wattenscheid 09	57	(4)
- * Club domestic league appearances and goals as of 23 September 2026

Steve Tunga Malanda (born 8 March 1997) is a German professional footballer who plays as a midfielder for SG Wattenscheid 09.

== Career ==
Tunga played youth football for Essener SG and VfL Bochum.

After playing for Rot-Weiß Oberhausen as well as SG Wattenscheid 09 in the German fourth division, Tunga was offered the chance to train and play friendlies for German Bundesliga side Borussia Dortmund through former Rot-Weiß Oberhausen head coach Mike Tullberg, eventually signing for the club, where he failed to make an appearance.

In 2020, he signed for Almere City in the Dutch second division. After the 2021–22 season, Tunga's contract was not extended by Almere City, and he left the club as a free agent.

== Personal life ==
Born in Germany, Tunga is of Angolan descent.
