= Victor Jensen =

Danish footballer (born 2000)

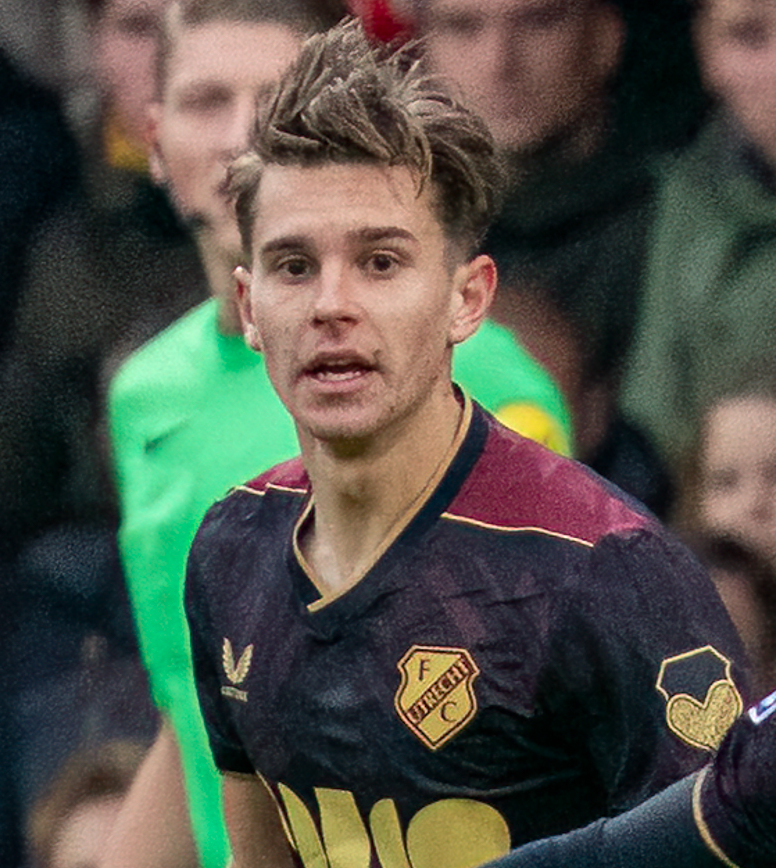
- Jensen with FC Utrecht in 2023

Personal information
- Full name: Victor Christoffer Jensen
- Date of birth: 8 February 2000 (age 26)
- Place of birth: Hvidovre, Denmark
- Height: 1.75 m (5 ft 9 in)
- Position: Attacking midfielder

Team information
- Current team: Utrecht
- Number: 7

Youth career
- 2007–2013: Hvidovre IF
- 2013–2017: Copenhagen

Senior career*
Years	Team	Apps	(Gls)
2017–2020	Jong Ajax	59	(14)
2020–2023	Ajax	2	(0)
2021	→ Nordsjælland (loan)	18	(3)
2022	→ Rosenborg (loan)	28	(5)
2023–	Utrecht	77	(15)

International career^{‡}
2015–2016	Denmark U16	7	(1)
2016–2017	Denmark U17	11	(6)
2017–2018	Denmark U18	6	(1)
2018–2019	Denmark U19	10	(2)
2021	Denmark U20	2	(0)
2019–2022	Denmark U21	10	(2)
- * Club domestic league appearances and goals as of 18 January 2026 ‡ National team caps and goals as of 4 June 2022

Victor Christoffer Jensen (born 8 February 2000) is a Danish professional footballer who plays as an attacking midfielder for Eredivisie club Utrecht.

== Club career ==
=== Ajax ===
On 2 June 2017, the 17-year-old Jensen officially signed for Ajax from FC Copenhagen's youth sector. Jensen would join the club's U19 squad on 1 July due to his young age. Copenhagen sold Jensen for about €3.5 million which made him the most expensive player ever under 18 to be sold from Denmark. In October 2017 Jensen was also nominated by The Guardian to the list of the 60 biggest talents born in 2000.

In his first season at Ajax, he played 27 games for the U19 squad, scoring 6 goals. He also made his way to Jong Ajax making his Eerste Divisie debut on 12 January 2018 in a game against Fortuna Sittard. From the 2018–19 season, he became a permanent part of the Jong Ajax squad.

Jensen made his first team debut on 11 January 2019 in a friendly game against Brazilian club Flamengo.

Jensen made his Eredivisie debut for Ajax on 12 December 2020 in a game against PEC Zwolle as a 75th-minute substitute for Antony.

==== Loan to Nordsjælland ====
On 1 February 2021, Jensen was sent on a six-month loan to Danish Superliga club Nordsjælland. He made his debut for the club on 4 February against Brøndby which ended in a 1–0 loss.

==== Loan to Rosenborg ====
On 1 March 2022, it was announced that Jensen had extended his contract with Ajax until 2024, while undergoing his second loan spell, this time with Eliteserien side Rosenborg BK, until the end of the year.

=== Utrecht ===
On 31 January 2023, Jensen joined Eredivisie side Utrecht on a permanent deal, signing a contract until June 2026 with the club.

== Career statistics ==
As of match played 18 January 2026

Appearances and goals by club, season and competition
Club	Season	League			Cup		Europe		Other		Total	
Club	Season	Division	Apps	Goals	Apps	Goals	Apps	Goals	Apps	Goals	Apps	Goals
Jong Ajax	2017–18	Eerste Divisie	3	1	—		—		—		3	1
Jong Ajax	2018–19	Eerste Divisie	20	3	—		—		—		20	3
Jong Ajax	2019–20	Eerste Divisie	12	5	—		—		—		12	5
Jong Ajax	2020–21	Eerste Divisie	14	4	—		—		—		14	4
Jong Ajax	2021–22	Eerste Divisie	11	1	—		—		—		11	1
Jong Ajax	Total		60	14	—		—		—		60	14
Ajax	2020–21	Eredivisie	1	0	0	0	0	0	0	0	1	0
Ajax	2021–22	Eredivisie	1	0	1	0	0	0	—		2	0
Ajax	Total		2	0	1	0	0	0	0	0	3	0
Nordsjælland (loan)	2021–22	Superliga	18	3	—		—		—		18	3
Rosenborg (loan)	2022	Eliteserien	28	5	2	0	—		—		30	5
Utrecht	2022–23	Eredivisie	12	1	2	0	—		1 (Note: Appearances in European playoffs)	0	15	1
Utrecht	2023–24	Eredivisie	28	7	2	0	—		2	1	32	8
Utrecht	2024–25	Eredivisie	29	2	3	2	—		—		32	4
Utrecht	2025–26	Eredivisie	8	5	2	1	6 (Note: Appearances in UEFA Europa League)	5	—		16	11
Utrecht	Total		77	15	9	3	6	5	3	1	95	24
Career total			185	38	12	3	6	5	3	1	206	47
