= Devyne Rensch =

Dutch footballer (born 2003)

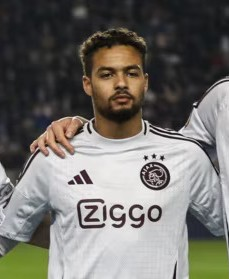
- Rensch lining up for Ajax in 2024

Personal information
- Full name: Devyne Fabian Jairo Rensch
- Date of birth: 18 January 2003 (age 23)
- Place of birth: Lelystad, Netherlands
- Height: 1.81 m (5 ft 11 in)
- Positions: Right-back; left-back

Team information
- Current team: Roma
- Number: 2

Youth career
- –2016: VV Unicum
- 2016–2020: Ajax

Senior career*
Years	Team	Apps	(Gls)
2020–2022	Jong Ajax	16	(3)
2020–2025	Ajax	105	(10)
2025–	Roma	38	(1)

International career^{‡}
2017–2018	Netherlands U15	4	(0)
2018	Netherlands U16	1	(0)
2019	Netherlands U17	17	(0)
2019	Netherlands U18	3	(0)
2021–	Netherlands U21	14	(2)
2021–	Netherlands	2	(0)
Medal record
Representing Netherlands
UEFA European Under-17 Championship
Winner	Ireland 2019	U-17 Team
- * Club domestic league appearances and goals as of 23:47, 24 May 2026 (UTC) ‡ National team caps and goals as of 23:09, 19 November 2024 (UTC)

Devyne Fabian Jairo Rensch (born 18 January 2003) is a Dutch professional footballer who plays as a right-back or left-back for Serie A club Roma and the Netherlands national team.

== Club career ==
=== Ajax ===
Rensch played in the youth academies of VV Unicum and Ajax. In the 2020–21 pre-season, Rensch, who had not yet made an appearance for Jong Ajax at that time, was given several minutes of play in Ajax's first team. During the regular season he was officially part of the first team, but he played most of his matches for Jong Ajax. On 19 November 2020, he was awarded the Abdelhak Nouri trophy as the best talent of Ajax's youth academy in the 2019–20 season. He succeeded Naci Ünüvar, who received the prize a year earlier. Rensch made his debut for Ajax's first team on 28 November 2020, in an Eredivisie match against Emmen. He made his first start on 31 January 2021. On 18 February, he made his European debut in the UEFA Europa League against Lille OSC. He scored his first goal for Ajax on 21 March in a 5–0 home win over ADO Den Haag. In the course of the season he received more and more playing time as a right back, partly due to injuries to other players, and he featured as a starter for Ajax in the second half of the season. On 18 April 2021, he won his first silverware with Ajax by beating Vitesse in the KNVB Cup final. After that, the Eredivisie title was also won.

Rensch played less during the 2021–22 season, losing his starting spot to Noussair Mazraoui. Before the start of the 2022–23 season, Rensch expressed his wish of playing a more decisive role after struggling to find his form in the previous season, and after the departure of fellow right-back Mazraoui. However, Ajax also brought in Jorge Sánchez for the position. After the start of the season, Rensch regained his form and became the starter.

=== Roma ===
On 23 January 2025, Rensch signed with Roma in Italy.

== International career ==
Born in the Netherlands, Rensch is of Surinamese descent. He was a youth international for the Netherlands.

He made his debut for the Netherlands national team on 7 September 2021 in a World Cup qualifier against Turkey, a 6–1 home victory. He substituted Denzel Dumfries in the 71st minute.

In June 2025 he was part of the Netherlands U21 for the 2025 UEFA European Under-21 Championship in Slovakia.

== Career statistics ==
=== Club ===
As of match played 10 September 2026

Appearances and goals by club, season and competition
Club	Season	League			National cup (Note: Includes KNVB Cup, Coppa Italia)		Europe		Other		Total	
Club	Season	Division	Apps	Goals	Apps	Goals	Apps	Goals	Apps	Goals	Apps	Goals
Jong Ajax	2020–21	Eerste Divisie	16	3	—		—		—		16	3
Ajax	2020–21	Eredivisie	18	3	4	0	5 (Note: Appearances in UEFA Europa League)	0	—		27	3
Ajax	2021–22	Eredivisie	19	1	4	0	5 (Note: Appearances in UEFA Champions League)	0	1 (Note: Appearance in Johan Cruyff Shield)	0	29	1
Ajax	2022–23	Eredivisie	26	3	3	0	6 (Note: Four appearances in UEFA Champions League, two appearances in UEFA Europa League)	0	1	0	36	3
Ajax	2023–24	Eredivisie	28	2	0	0	10 (Note: Six appearances in UEFA Europa League, four appearances in UEFA Europa Conference League)	0	—		38	2
Ajax	2024–25	Eredivisie	14	1	1	0	11	0	—		26	1
Ajax	Total		105	10	12	0	37	0	2	0	156	10
Roma	2024–25	Serie A	14	0	1	0	3	0	—		18	0
Roma	2025–26	Serie A	24	1	1	0	7	0	—		32	1
Roma	2026–27	Serie A	0	0	0	0	1	0	—		1	0
Roma	Total		38	1	2	0	11	0	—		51	1
Career total			159	14	14	0	48	0	2	0	223	14

=== International ===
As of match played 19 November 2024

Appearances and goals by national team and year
National team	Year	Apps	Goals
Netherlands	2021	1	0
Netherlands	2024	1	0
Total		2	0

== Honours ==
Ajax

- Eredivisie: 2020–21, 2021–22
- KNVB Cup: 2020–21

Netherlands U17

- UEFA European Under-17 Championship: 2019

Individual

- Abdelhak Nouri Trophy: 2019–20
- Eredivisie Team of the Month: September 2024
