= Perr Schuurs =

Dutch footballer (born 1999)

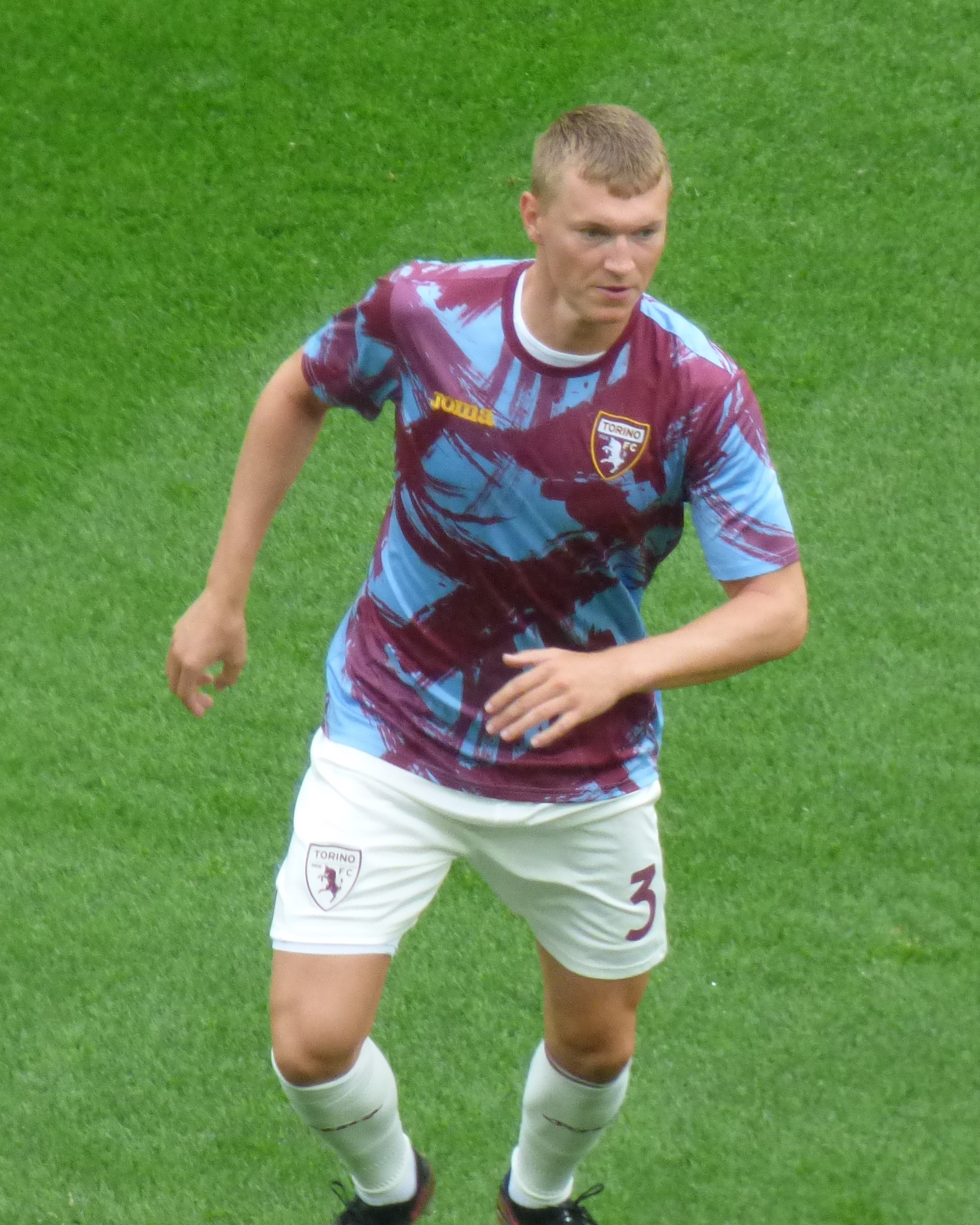
- Schuurs with Torino in 2023

Personal information
- Date of birth: 26 November 1999 (age 26)
- Place of birth: Nieuwstadt, Netherlands
- Height: 1.91 m (6 ft 3 in)
- Position: Centre-back

Team information
- Current team: NEC
- Number: 4

Youth career
- 2010–2011: FC RIA
- 2011–2016: Fortuna Sittard

Senior career*
Years	Team	Apps	(Gls)
2016–2018	Fortuna Sittard	41	(7)
2018–2020	Jong Ajax	31	(5)
2018–2022	Ajax	62	(2)
2018	→ Fortuna Sittard (loan)	16	(3)
2022–2026	Torino	39	(1)
2026–	NEC	6	(2)

International career^{‡}
2017–2018	Netherlands U19	4	(0)
2018–2021	Netherlands U21	17	(2)
- * Club domestic league appearances and goals as of 25 October 2026 ‡ National team caps and goals as of 3 June 2021

Perr Schuurs (born 26 November 1999) is a Dutch professional footballer who plays as a centre-back for Eredivisie club NEC.

== Club career ==
=== Fortuna Sittard ===
Schuurs made his senior league debut for Sittard on 14 October 2016 in an Eerste Divisie 2–0 home win against VVV-Venlo. He scored his first goal on 6 February 2017 in Fortuna's 5–2 home victory over Jong Ajax.

For the 2017–18 season, Schuurs, aged 17, was made captain of Fortuna Sittard.

=== Ajax ===
In January 2018, Schuurs became a player of Ajax, who sent him back on loan to Fortuna Sittard for the remainder of the season. On 7 October 2018, Schuurs made his Eredivisie debut as a substitute for Ajax in a 5–0 win against AZ.

=== Torino ===
Schuurs transferred to Italian club Torino in August 2022. He quickly established himself as a starting centre-back for the team, scoring once in 33 appearances during his first season at the club.

However, on 21 October 2023, Schuurs suffered a torn anterior cruciate ligament in his left knee during a match against Inter Milan. Following this injury, Schuurs struggled for recovery and would not play another game for Torino, and on 6 February 2026, his contract with the club was mutually terminated.

=== NEC Nijmegen ===
On 16 June 2026, Schuurs joined Eredivisie club NEC Nijmegen on a three-year contract. On 29 August 2026, Schuurs made his NEC debut, marking his first competitive appearance in 1,043 days. He came on as an 80th-minute substitute for Bram Nuytinck and scored three minutes later to secure a 3–1 away win over PEC Zwolle.

== International career ==
Schuurs was called up to the senior Netherlands squad for the UEFA Nations League matches against Poland and Italy in September 2020.

== Personal life ==
Schuurs is a son of former Dutch international handball player Lambert Schuurs and his sister Demi is a professional tennis player.

== Career statistics ==
As of match played 25 October 2026

Appearances and goals by club, season and competition
Club	Season	League			National cup (Note: Includes KNVB Cup, Coppa Italia)		Europe		Other		Total	
Club	Season	Division	Apps	Goals	Apps	Goals	Apps	Goals	Apps	Goals	Apps	Goals
Fortuna Sittard	2016–17	Eerste Divisie	24	2	0	0	—		—		24	2
Fortuna Sittard	2017–18	Eerste Divisie	17	5	3	0	—		—		20	5
Fortuna Sittard	Total		41	7	3	0	—		—		44	7
Fortuna Sittard (loan)	2017–18	Eerste Divisie	16	3	0	0	—		0	0	16	3
Jong Ajax	2018–19	Eerste Divisie	29	4	—		—		—		29	4
Jong Ajax	2019–20	Eerste Divisie	2	1	—		—		—		2	1
Jong Ajax	Total		31	5	—		—		—		31	5
Ajax	2018–19	Eredivisie	1	0	3	1	0	0	—		4	1
Ajax	2019–20	Eredivisie	10	1	1	0	5 (Note: Three appearances in UEFA Champions League, two appearances in UEFA Europa League)	0	1 (Note: Appearance in Johan Cruyff Shield)	0	17	1
Ajax	2020–21	Eredivisie	27	1	4	0	10 (Note: Six appearances in UEFA Champions League, four appearances in UEFA Europa League)	0	—		41	1
Ajax	2021–22	Eredivisie	22	0	5	0	3 (Note: Appearances in UEFA Champions League)	0	0	0	30	0
Ajax	2022–23	Eredivisie	2	0	0	0	0	0	1	0	3	0
Ajax	Total		62	2	13	1	18	0	2	0	95	3
Torino	2022–23	Serie A	30	0	3	1	—		—		33	1
Torino	2023–24	Serie A	9	1	1	0	—		—		10	1
Torino	2024–25	Serie A	0	0	0	0	—		—		0	0
Torino	2025–26	Serie A	0	0	0	0	—		—		0	0
Torino	Total		39	1	4	1	—		—		43	2
NEC	2026–27	Eredivisie	6	2	0	0	3 (Note: Appearances in UEFA Europa League)	0	—		9	2
Career total			195	20	20	2	21	0	2	0	238	22

== Honours ==
Ajax

- Eredivisie: 2018–19, 2020–21, 2021–22
- KNVB Cup: 2018–19, 2020–21
- Johan Cruyff Shield: 2019

Individual

- UEFA European Under-21 Championship Team of the Tournament: 2021
- Eredivisie Team of the Month: December 2021
