= Lorenzo van Kleef =

Dutch footballer (born 2001)

Personal information
- Date of birth: 26 January 2001 (age 25)
- Place of birth: The Hague, Netherlands
- Height: 1.83 m (6 ft 0 in)
- Position: Right-back

Team information
- Current team: Scheveningen
- Number: 8

Youth career
- SV Houtwijk
- –2013: Haaglandia
- 2013–2014: SV VELO
- 2014–2019: ADO Den Haag

Senior career*
Years	Team	Apps	(Gls)
2019–2021	ADO Den Haag	2	(0)
2020–2021	→ FC Eindhoven (loan)	31	(2)
2021–2022	Quick Boys	19	(1)
2022–2023	Jong Sparta Rotterdam	15	(0)
2023–	Scheveningen	45	(2)

International career
2016–2017	Netherlands U16	10	(3)
- * Club domestic league appearances and goals as of 02:45, 4 August 2025 (UTC)

Lorenzo van Kleef (born 26 January 2001) is a Dutch professional footballer who plays as a right-back for Vierde Divisie club Scheveningen.

== Professional career ==
On 3 April 2016, Van Kleef signed his first professional contract with ADO Den Haag. Van Kleef made his professional debut with ADO Den Haag in a 3-1 Eredivisie loss to PSV Eindhoven on 11 August 2019.

In May 2022, Van Kleef joined Jong Sparta Rotterdam, the reserve team of Sparta Rotterdam. On 30 January 2023, he moved to SVV Scheveningen.
