= Duivendrecht =

- Village
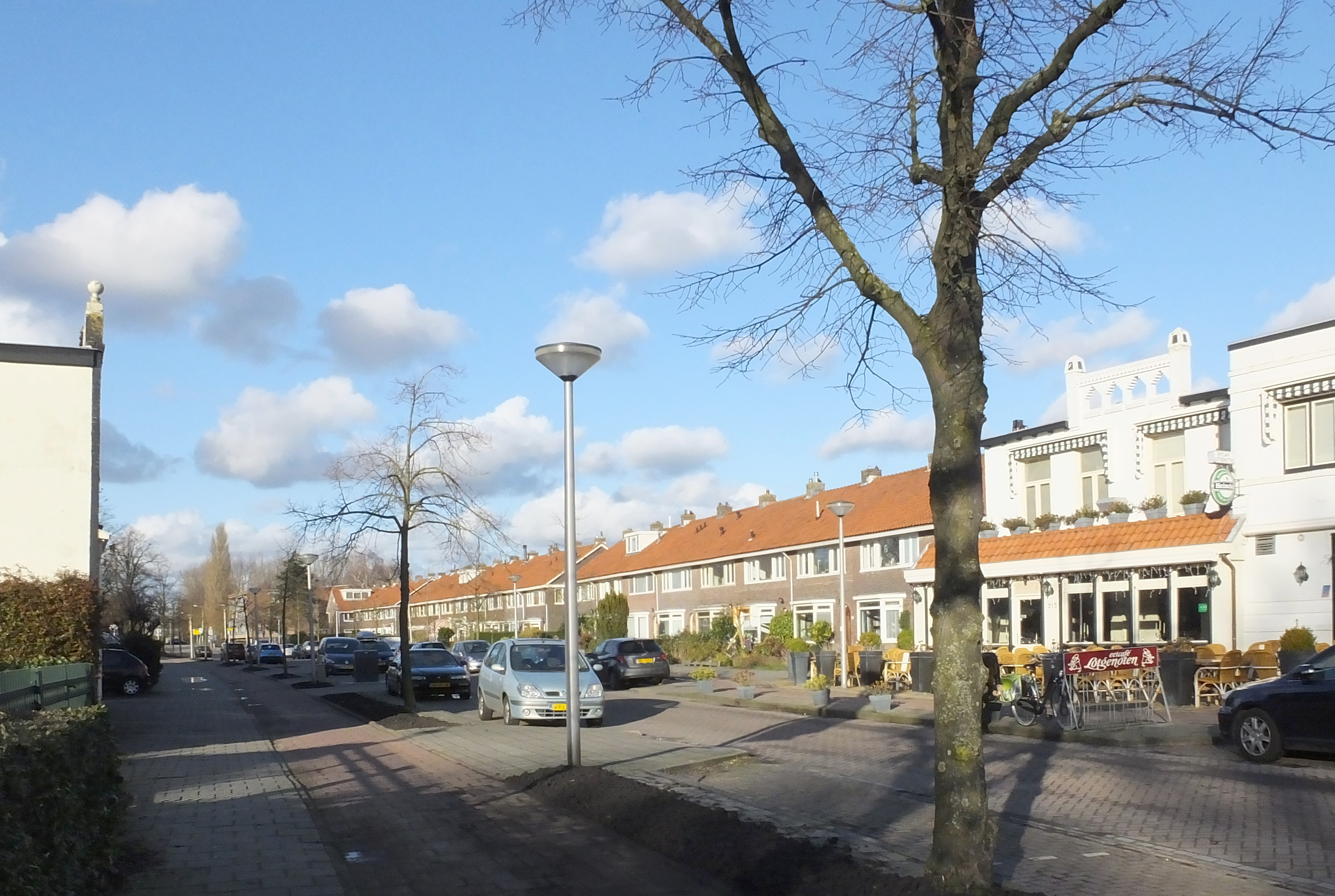

- Location in the Netherlands Location in the province of North Holland in the Netherlands
- Coordinates: 52°20′N 4°56′E
- Country: Netherlands
- Province: North Holland
- Municipality: Ouder-Amstel

Area
  - Total: 1.41 km^{2} (0.54 sq mi)
- Elevation: −0.8 m (−2.6 ft)

Population (2021)
  - Total: 5,300
  - Density: 3,800/km^{2} (9,700/sq mi)
- Time zone: UTC+1 (CET)
  - Summer (DST): UTC+2 (CEST)
- Postal code: 1115
- Dialing code: 020

Duivendrecht (Dutch pronunciation: [ˈdœyvə(n)ˌdrɛxt]) is a village in the Dutch province of North Holland. It is a part of the municipality of Ouder-Amstel, and lies about 6 km southeast of Amsterdam’s city centre. It is a suburb of Amsterdam.

== History ==
The village was first mentioned in 1308 as Doevendrecht, and means "ferry of Doeve (person)." Duivendrecht started to developed in the 19th century and has become encircled by Amsterdam, Diemen and the Bijlmermeer.

The Catholic St Urbanus Church is a single aisled cruciform church with a double tower. It was built between 1877 and 1878 as a replacement of the 1840 church.

The local Duivendrecht railway station is a major interchange point on the Dutch railway network. It opened in 1993 and is on the Amsterdam to Arnhem railway line, the Weesp to Leiden line as well as the Amsterdam Metro.

== Radio Stations (local) ==
The local radio station for Duivendrecht is Jamm fm 104.9 Smooth & Funky.

== Born in Duivendrecht ==
- Wim Eijk, Roman Catholic archbishop (22 June 1953)

== Gallery ==
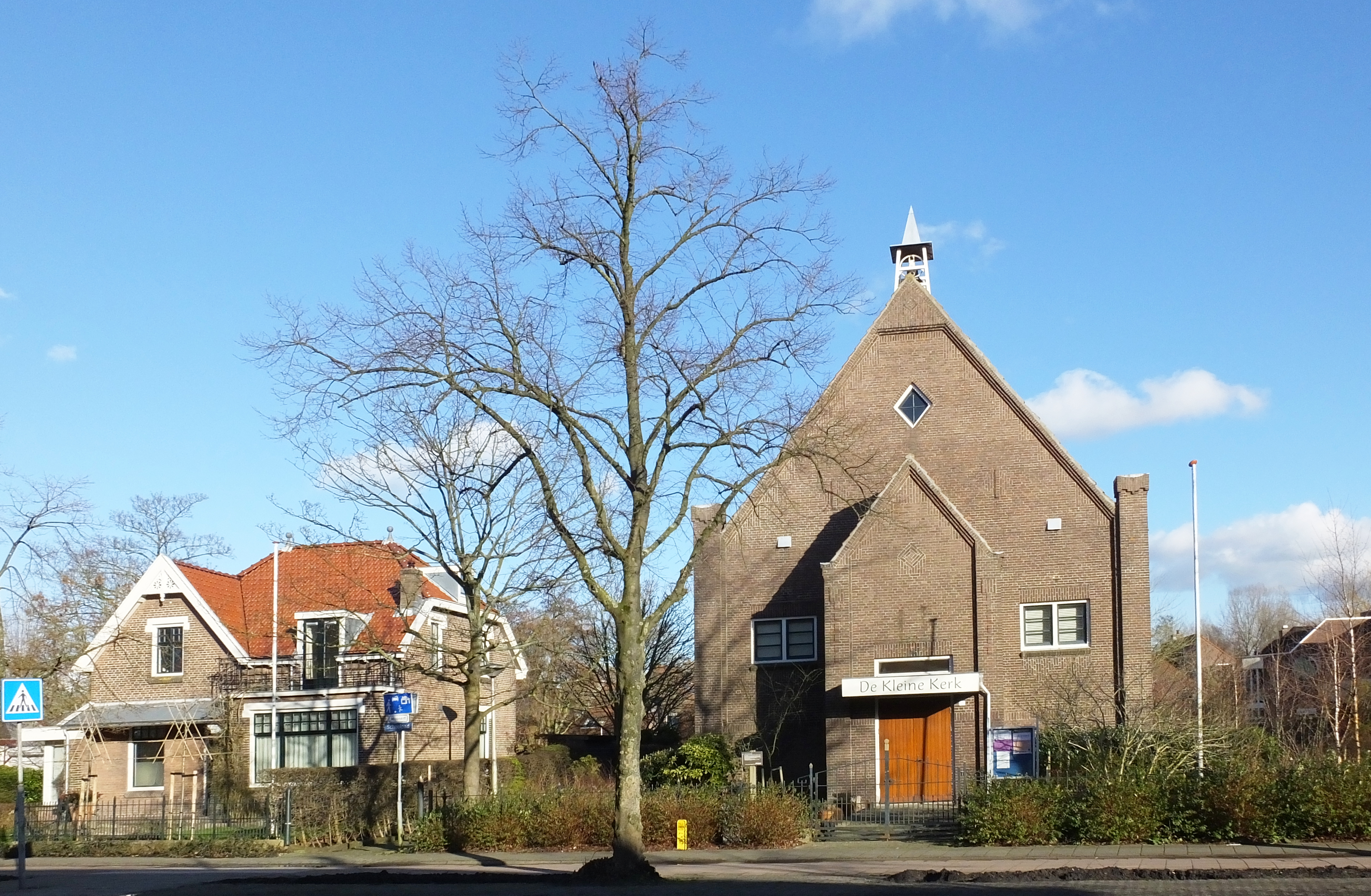
Little church of Duivendrecht

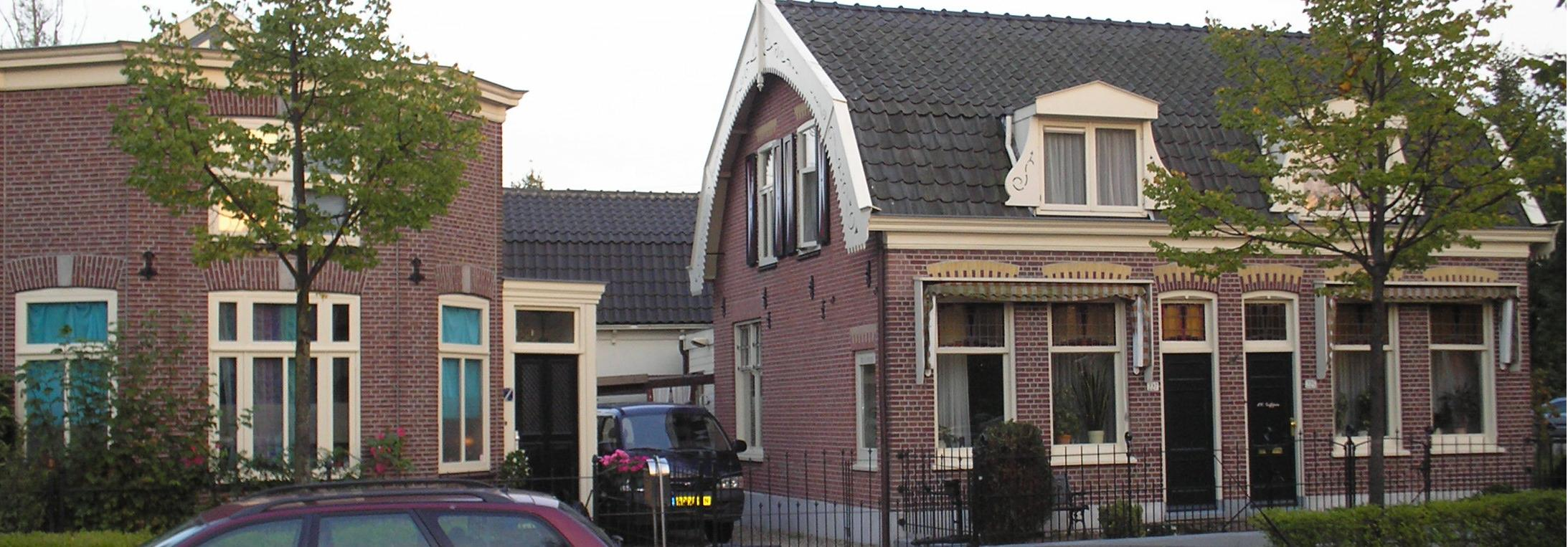
Houses in Duivendrecht

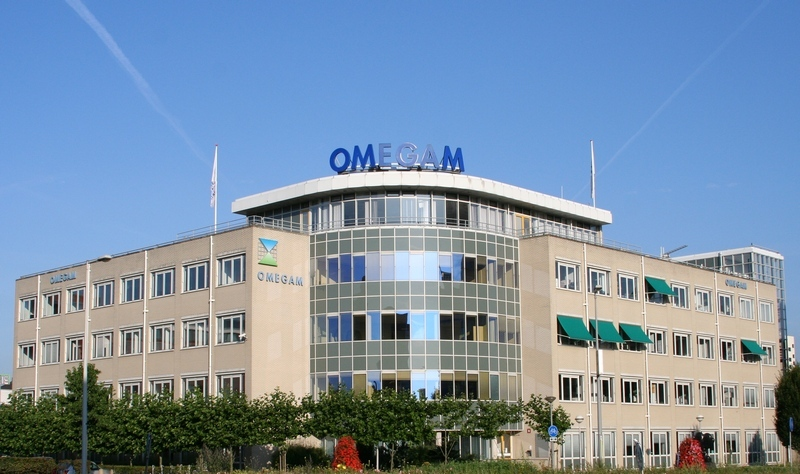
Omegam Laboratories

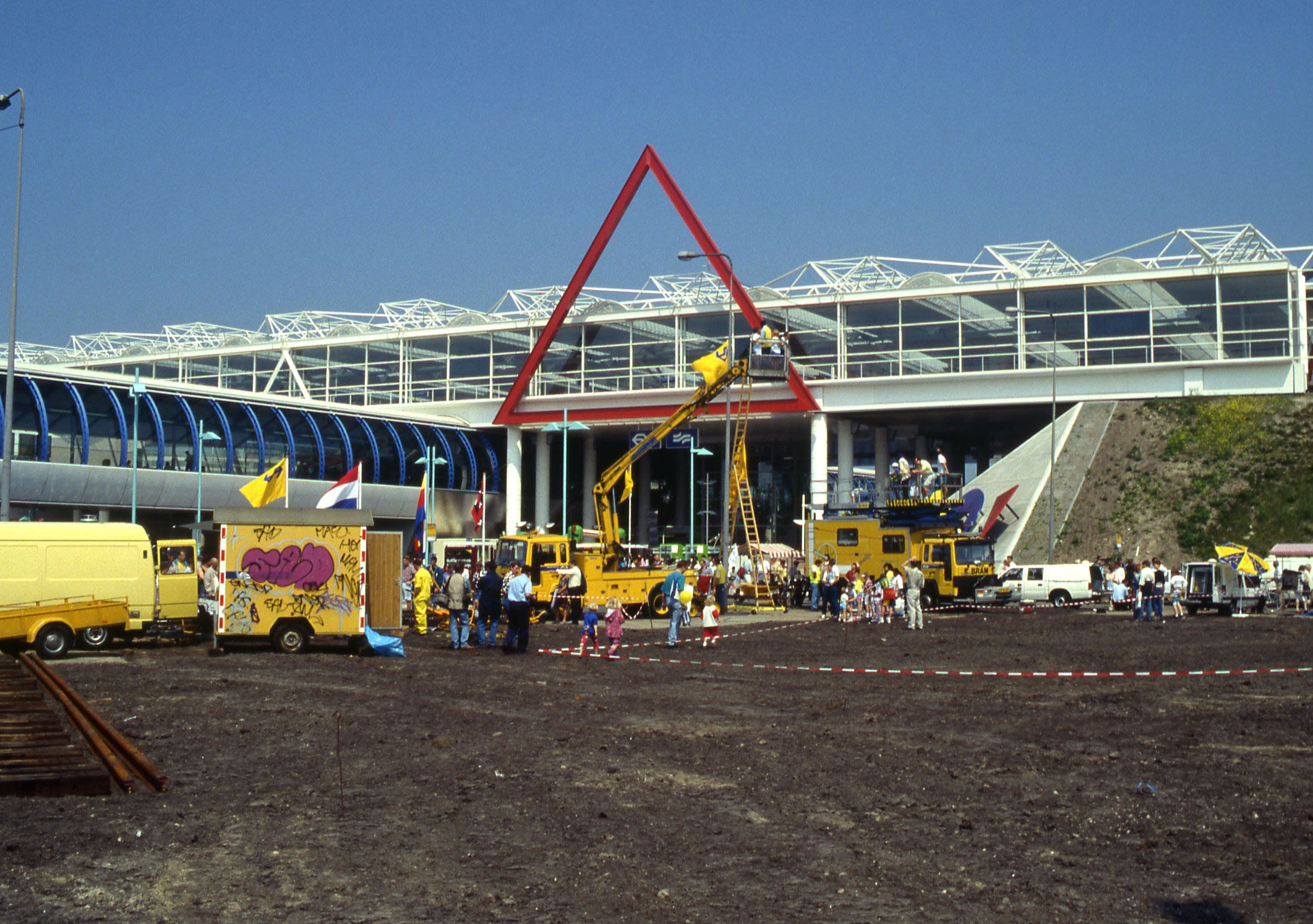
Opening of Duivendrecht railway station (1993)
