= Max de Waal =

Dutch footballer (born 2002)

Personal information
- Date of birth: 10 January 2002 (age 24)
- Place of birth: Hoorn, Netherlands
- Height: 1.84 m (6 ft 0 in)
- Positions: Forward; attacking midfielder

Youth career
- 2007–2012: Always Forward
- 2011–2013: HV Veerhuys
- 2012–2013: Hollandia
- 2013–2019: Ajax

Senior career*
Years	Team	Apps	(Gls)
2019–2023	Jong Ajax	41	(11)
2022	→ PEC Zwolle (loan)	7	(0)
2022–2023	→ ADO Den Haag (loan)	18	(2)
2023–2026	Willem II	16	(1)
2024–2025	→ VVV-Venlo (loan)	18	(2)

International career
2017	Netherlands U15	2	(0)
2018	Netherlands U16	1	(0)
- * Club domestic league appearances and goals as of 19:51, 14 January 2026 (UTC)

Max de Waal (born 10 January 2002) is a Dutch professional footballer who plays as a forward or attacking midfielder.

== Club career ==
=== Ajax ===
De Waal began his football career with Always Forward, based in his hometown Hoorn, for whom he played until 2012. He also played for HV Veerhuys for three years while playing for Always Forward. He then moved to Hollandia for a year before moving to the renowned Ajax youth academy. In 2017–18, he made one appearance for the under-17 team. In the following season he established himself in the team and scored nine goals in 26 games. In 2019–20, De Waal mainly played for the under-19 team, including in the UEFA Youth League.

He made his first appearance for Jong Ajax in the second-tier Eerste Divisie in a match against Jong PSV on 16 September 2019. He came on in the 69th minute for Alex Mendez and scored the 2–0 winner in stoppage time. During the season he was utilised once more in the Eerste Divisie. In the following season, he played more regularly for the Jong Ajax team. However, he would only signed his first professional contract with Jong Ajax in December 2020.

==== Loans ====
In January 2022, De Waal extended his contract with Ajax but immediately went out on loan to bottom of the table side PEC Zwolle. He made his debut for the side on 5 February 2022, replacing Mustafa Saymak in the 81st minute of a 1–1 home draw against NEC. De Waal made seven appearances for PEC – all as a substitute – as the club suffered relegation to the Eerste Divisie at the end of the season.

On 24 June 2022, after returning to Ajax, De Waal was sent on a one-season loan to Eerste Divisie club ADO Den Haag. He made his ADO debut under new head coach Dirk Kuyt on the first matchday of the 2022–23 season, starting in midfield in a resounding 4–0 defeat against recently relegated Heracles Almelo; all goals fell in the first half. On 28 August, De Waal scored his first goal for the club against his parent club Jong Ajax, adding an assist to help ADO to a 4–0 home win. Following Kuyt's dismissal in November 2022, De Waal was utilised less frequently and mainly appeared as a substitute during his successor Dick Advocaat's tenure during the latter part of the season. De Waal scored twice in 21 appearances for ADO, before returning to Ajax in June 2023.

=== Willem II ===
On 12 July 2023, De Waal signed a three-year contract with Eerste Divisie club Willem II. He made his competitive debut for the club on the first matchday of the season, starting in a 1–1 away draw against FC Eindhoven on 13 August. On 6 October, he scored his first goal for the Tricolores in a 4–2 league victory against De Graafschap after coming on as a second-half substitute.

On 2 September 2024, De Waal joined VVV-Venlo on a season-long loan from Willem II. He returned to his parent club at the end of the season.

In January 2026, De Waal's contract with Willem II was terminated by mutual consent, six months before its scheduled expiry. He had not featured in the matchday squad in the preceding months, with his final appearance for the club coming in August 2025.

== International career ==
De Waal has played for two Netherlands national youth teams, but has yet to play in a major tournament.

== Career statistics ==
As of match played 29 August 2025

Appearances and goals by club, season and competition
Club	Season	League			National cup		Europe		Other		Total	
Club	Season	Division	Apps	Goals	Apps	Goals	Apps	Goals	Apps	Goals	Apps	Goals
Jong Ajax	2019–20	Eerste Divisie	2	1	—		—		—		2	1
Jong Ajax	2020–21	Eerste Divisie	19	1	—		—		—		19	1
Jong Ajax	2021–22	Eerste Divisie	20	9	—		—		—		20	9
Jong Ajax	2022–23	Eerste Divisie	0	0	—		—		—		0	0
Jong Ajax	Total		41	11	—		—		—		41	11
PEC Zwolle (loan)	2021–22	Eredivisie	7	0	0	0	—		—		7	0
ADO Den Haag (loan)	2022–23	Eerste Divisie	18	2	3	0	—		—		21	1
Willem II	2023–24	Eerste Divisie	14	1	1	0	—		—		15	1
Willem II	2024–25	Eredivisie	0	0	0	0	—		0	0	0	0
Willem II	2025–26	Eerste Divisie	2	0	0	0	—		—		2	0
Willem II	Total		16	1	1	0	—		0	0	17	1
VVV-Venlo (loan)	2024–25	Eerste Divisie	18	2	1	0	—		—		19	2
Career total			100	16	5	0	0	0	0	0	105	16
