= Saïd Bakari =

Footballer (born 1994)

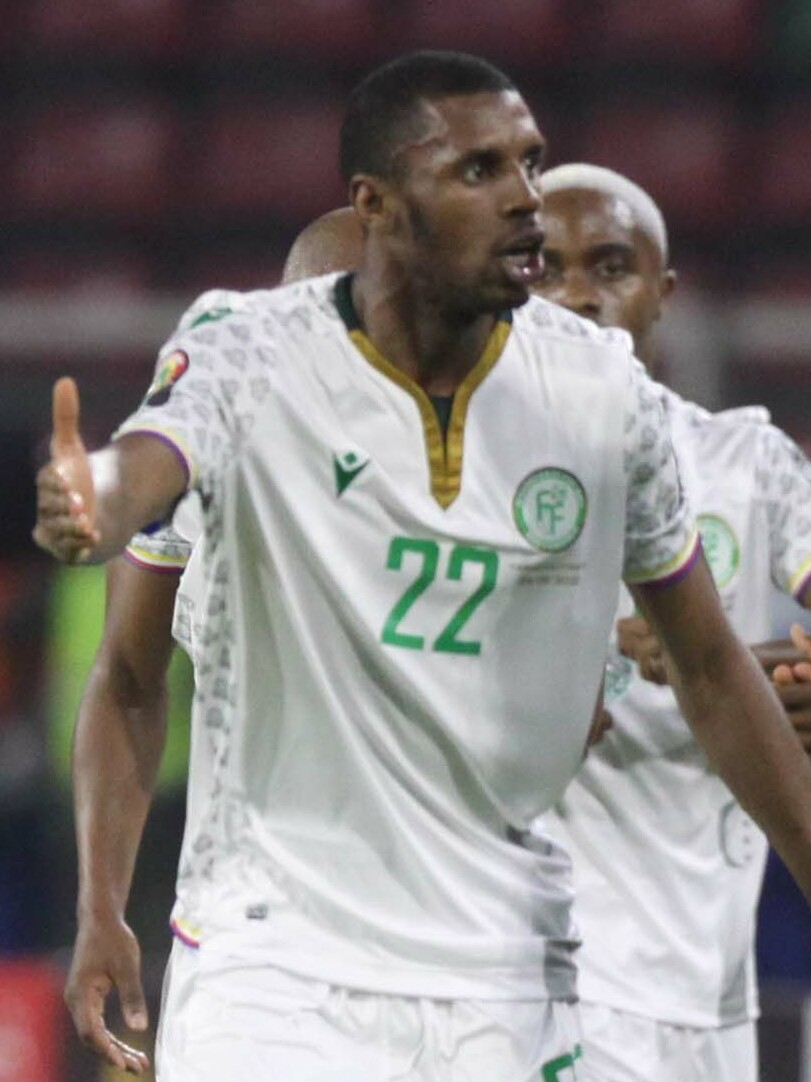
- Bakari playing for Comoros at the 2021 Africa Cup of Nations

Personal information
- Full name: Saïd Riad Bakari
- Date of birth: 22 September 1994 (age 32)
- Place of birth: La Courneuve, France
- Height: 1.78 m (5 ft 10 in)
- Position: Winger

Youth career
- 2005–2010: FC Bourget
- 2010–2011: Paris Saint-Germain
- 2011–2012: Red Star
- 2012–2013: Chantilly

Senior career*
Years	Team	Apps	(Gls)
2013–2015	Turnhout	19	(4)
2015–2016	Bonchamp	21	(8)
2016–2017	UR Namur	28	(6)
2017–2023	RKC Waalwijk	131	(4)
2023–2026	Sparta Rotterdam	72	(1)

International career^{‡}
2017–	Comoros	51	(1)
- * Club domestic league appearances and goals as of 21 May 2026 ‡ National team caps and goals as of 23:17, 29 December 2025 (UTC)

Saïd Riad Bakari (born 22 September 1994) is a professional footballer who plays as a winger. Born in France, he plays for the Comoros national team.

Born in La Courneuve, Bakari played youth football for FC Bourget, Paris Saint-Germain, Red Star and Chantilly before starting his senior career at Belgian third tier club Turnhout in 2013. He had spells with fellow amateur clubs Bonchamp and Namur before joining Eerste Divisie club RKC Waalwijk in 2017, initially on a non-contract basis before signing a professional contract later that year. He was promoted to the Eredivisie with the club in 2019.

Bakari made his debut for the Comoros national team in 2017, against Mauritania. He played every match of Comoros' qualification campaign for the 2021 Africa Cup of Nations as they qualified for their first ever tournament. He made four appearances in the final tournament as Comoros were eliminated in the round of 16.

== Club career ==
=== Early career ===
Bakari was born in La Courneuve, France, to Comoran parents and grew up there alongside his five siblings. He played youth football for FC Bourget between 2005 and 2010. He subsequently joined Paris Saint-Germain's academy but left in 2011 due to a lack of game time. He had spells with Red Star and US Chantilly's academies before leaving home in 2013 to move to Belgium, where he played for Turnhout in the Belgian Third Division B. He played twice in the 2013–14 season and 17 times in the 2014–15 season, scoring four times in the latter but was forced to leave the club at the end of the season following the club's bankruptcy.

After the promise a move to a Moroccan club fell through, Bakari signed for French part-time Régional 1 club ES Bonchamp where he scored 8 goals in 21 games during the 2015–16 season. He combined his spell at Bonchamp with part-time work, first in a supermarket before working as a school caretaker. He returned to Belgium with UR Namur in 2016 and scored 6 in 28 Belgian Second Amateur Division appearances during the 2016–17 season.

=== RKC Waalwijk ===
After a successful trial with Eerste Divisie club RKC Waalwijk, Bakari signed for their under-23 side in summer 2017 on an amateur basis. He made his first-team debut for the club on 25 August 2017 as a substitute in a 2–1 defeat to Jong AZ. He scored his first goal for the club in the first minute of a 4–1 win over SC Telstar on 17 November 2021. In December 2017, he signed a two-year professional contract with the club, including the option for a further year, having played in 15 of the club's first 16 matches. In total, he scored once in 23 matches during the 2017–18 season. He played three times during the 2018–19 season as Waalwijk were promoted to the Eredivisie via the play-offs.

Bakari made his Eredivisie debut on 11 August 2019 in a 2–0 defeat to AZ Alkmaar, becoming the first player from Comoros to play in the division. Bakari played mainly as a left-back during the early stages of the 2019–20 season following an injury to usual left-back Paul Quasten. He scored his first Eredivisie goal on 19 October 2019 in the 63rd minute of a 2–1 home defeat to AFC Ajax. He made 18 appearances in the 2019–20 Eredivisie, scoring once, before the season was cut short due to the COVID-19 pandemic. In September 2020, Baraki signed a contract with RKC valid until summer 2023. He scored for the club in a 1–0 win away to Heracles Almelo on 17 October 2021, which was his only goal in 30 league appearances that season.

=== Sparta Rotterdam ===
On 25 April 2023, Bakari signed a contract with Sparta Rotterdam for two seasons, with an option for a third, beginning in the 2023–24 season.

== International career ==
Born in France to Comorian parents, Bakari was called up to the Comoros national team in September 2017. He made his debut for Comoros in a 1–0 friendly win over Mauritania on 6 October 2017. He represented Comoros at the 2018 COSAFA Cup and made one appearance in 2019 Africa Cup of Nations qualification as Comoros failed to qualify. He was part of Comoros' successful bid to qualify for the 2021 Africa Cup of Nations, playing all six of their qualification Group G games as Comoros qualified for their first ever Africa Cup of Nations. In December 2021, it was announced that Bakari was named in Comoros' squad for the tournament, which started in January 2022. He made four appearances as Comoros were eliminated by Cameroon in the round of 16.

On 11 December 2025, Bakari was called up to the Comoros squad for the 2025 Africa Cup of Nations.

== Career statistics ==
=== Club ===
As of match played 11 April 2026

Appearances and goals by club, season and competition
Club	Season	League			National cup		Europe		Other		Total	
Club	Season	Division	Apps	Goals	Apps	Goals	Apps	Goals	Apps	Goals	Apps	Goals
Turnhout	2013–14	Belgian Division 3	2	0	—		—		—		2	0
Turnhout	2014–15	Belgian Division 3	17	4	—		—		—		17	4
Turnhout	Total		19	4	—		—		—		19	4
RKC Waalwijk	2017–18	Eerste Divisie	23	1	3	2	—		—		26	3
RKC Waalwijk	2018–19	Eerste Divisie	3	0	1	0	—		0	0	4	0
RKC Waalwijk	2019–20	Eredivisie	18	1	1	0	—		—		19	1
RKC Waalwijk	2020–21	Eredivisie	30	1	0	0	—		—		30	1
RKC Waalwijk	2021–22	Eredivisie	31	1	3	2	—		—		34	3
RKC Waalwijk	2022–23	Eredivisie	26	0	1	0	—		—		27	0
RKC Waalwijk	Total		131	4	9	4	—		—		140	8
Sparta Rotterdam	2023–24	Eredivisie	33	0	1	0	—		1 (Note: Appearances in European competition play-offs)	0	35	0
Sparta Rotterdam	2024–25	Eredivisie	26	1	1	0	—		0	0	27	1
Sparta Rotterdam	2025–26	Eredivisie	12	0	2	0	—		—		14	0
Sparta Rotterdam	Total		71	1	4	0	—		1	0	76	1
Career total			221	9	13	4	0	0	1	0	235	13

=== International ===
As of 29 December 2025

Appearances and goals by national team and year
National team	Year	Apps	Goals
Comoros	2017	1	0
Comoros	2018	5	0
Comoros	2019	5	0
Comoros	2020	3	0
Comoros	2021	4	0
Comoros	2022	9	0
Comoros	2023	6	0
Comoros	2024	10	0
Comoros	2025	8	1
Total		51	1

Scores and results list Comoros's goal tally first, score column indicates score after each Bakari goal.

List of international goals scored by Saïd Bakari
No.	Date	Venue	Opponent	Score	Result	Competition
1	9 June 2025	Fadil Vokrri Stadium, Pristina, Kosovo	Kosovo	1–0	2–4	Friendly

== Style of play ==
Although mainly a winger, Bakari retrained to play as a left-back during the 2019–20 season following an injury to Paul Quasten.

== Honours ==
Individual

- Eredivisie Team of the Month: March 2025
