= Mike Eerdhuijzen =

Dutch footballer (born 2000)

Personal information
- Date of birth: 13 July 2000 (age 26)
- Place of birth: Volendam, Netherlands
- Height: 1.94 m (6 ft 4 in)
- Position: Centre back

Team information
- Current team: Mechelen
- Number: 44

Youth career
- –2018: Volendam

Senior career*
Years	Team	Apps	(Gls)
2018–2022	Jong Volendam	49	(4)
2019–2022	Volendam	57	(1)
2022–2025	Sparta Rotterdam	76	(2)
2025–2026	Utrecht	13	(0)
2026–	Mechelen	4	(0)

International career^{‡}
2018	Netherlands U20	1	(0)
- * Club domestic league appearances and goals as of 19 September 2026 ‡ National team caps and goals as of 08:22, 11 December 2020 (UTC)

Mike Eerdhuijzen (born 13 July 2000) is a Dutch professional footballer who plays as a centre back for Belgian Pro League club Mechelen.

== Club career ==
Born in Volendam, Noord-Holland, Eerdhuijzen played in the youth department of FC Volendam until 2018, where he signed a contract until 2022. From 2017, he began playing for Jong FC Volendam in the Derde Divisie.

He made his debut in the first team of FC Volendam on 19 April 2019, in the 2–3 loss at home against NEC. He came on as a substitute for Darryl Bäly in the 68th minute.

On 18 August 2021, Eerdhuijzen became unwell during practice, but subsequent examinations at the hospital showed, that he did not suffer from heart issues.

On 31 January 2022, Eerdhuijzen signed a contract with Sparta Rotterdam, effective 1 July 2022.

On 19 May 2025, Eerdhuijzen agreed to move to Utrecht on a four-year contract.

On 22 August 2026, Eerdhuijzen signed a four-season contract with Mechelen in Belgium.

== International career ==
In November 2018, Eerdhuijzen was called up for the Netherlands under-20 team by coach Bert Konterman for the friendlies against Switzerland and Italy. He made his international debut for the Netherlands youth team on 15 November 2018 in the 3–1 away win over Switzerland U20, coming on as a substitute in the 70th minute for Shaquille Pinas.

== Career statistics ==
As of match played 15 August 2026

Appearances and goals by club, season and competition
Club	Season	League			Cup		Europe		Other		Total	
Club	Season	Division	Apps	Goals	Apps	Goals	Apps	Goals	Apps	Goals	Apps	Goals
Jong Volendam	2016–17	Derde Divisie	1	0	—		—		—		1	0
Jong Volendam	2017–18	Derde Divisie	2	0	—		—		1 (Note: Appearance(s) in Derde Divisie play-offs)	0	3	0
Jong Volendam	2018–19	Derde Divisie	31	2	—		—		—		31	2
Jong Volendam	2019–20	Tweede Divisie	12	1	—		—		—		12	1
Jong Volendam	2020–21	Tweede Divisie	2	1	—		—		—		2	1
Jong Volendam	2021–22	Tweede Divisie	9	0	—		—		—		9	0
Jong Volendam	Total		57	4	—		—		1	0	58	4
Volendam	2018–19	Eerste Divisie	1	0	0	0	—		—		1	0
Volendam	2019–20	Eerste Divisie	12	0	0	0	—		—		12	0
Volendam	2020–21	Eerste Divisie	22	0	1	0	—		0	0	23	0
Volendam	2021–22	Eerste Divisie	22	1	1	0	—		—		23	1
Volendam	Total		57	1	2	0	—		—		59	1
Sparta Rotterdam	2022–23	Eredivisie	25	0	2	0	—		4 (Note: Appearance(s) in Eredivisie play-offs)	0	31	0
Sparta Rotterdam	2023–24	Eredivisie	19	1	0	0	—		1	0	20	1
Sparta Rotterdam	2024–25	Eredivisie	32	1	1	0	—		0	0	33	1
Sparta Rotterdam	Total		76	2	3	0	—		5	0	85	2
Utrecht	2025–26	Eredivisie	9	0	1	0	3 (Note: Appearance(s) in UEFA Europa League)	0	1 (Note: Appearance in European play-offs)	0	14	0
Utrecht	2026–27	Eredivisie	2	0	0	0	—		—		2	0
Utrecht	Total		11	0	1	0	3	0	1	0	16	0
Career total			201	7	6	0	3	0	7	0	217	7

== Honours ==
Jong Volendam

- Derde Divisie – Sunday: 2018–19

Individual

- Eredivisie Team of the Month: February 2025, March 2025
