= Gilles Deusings =

Belgian footballer

Personal information
- Full name: Gilles Frédéric Deusings
- Date of birth: 17 November 1997 (age 28)
- Place of birth: Dalhem, Belgium
- Height: 1.87 m (6 ft 2 in)
- Position: Goalkeeper

Team information
- Current team: Stade Verviétois
- Number: 1

Youth career
- –2014: Visé

Senior career*
Years	Team	Apps	(Gls)
2014–2015	Visé	15	(0)
2015–2016	Alemannia Aachen II	4	(0)
2016–2017	Seraing	5	(0)
2017–2020	MVV	10	(0)
2021–2022	Wiltz 71	0	(0)
2022–2025	Royal Aywaille	33	(0)
2025–	Stade Verviétois	0	(0)
- * Club domestic league appearances and goals as of 11:25, 21 January 2026 (UTC)

Gilles Frédéric Deusings (born 17 November 1997) is a Belgian footballer who plays as a goalkeeper for Stade Verviétois.

== Career ==
Born in Dalhem, Deusings started his career at C.S. Visé before playing for Alemannia Aachen II and R.F.C. Seraing. He joined MVV Maastricht on trial on 16 August 2017, before signing for the club on a permanent basis two weeks later. He signed a one-year contract extension with the club in June 2018 on a one-year contract. In April 2019, his contract with the club was extended by one year, and he made his debut for the club shortly after in a 1–1 Eerste Divisie draw at home to NEC Nijmegen on 3 May 2020.

== Career statistics ==
As of 5 June 2020

Appearances and goals by club, season and competition
Club	Season	League			National Cup		Other		Total	
Club	Season	Division	Apps	Goals	Apps	Goals	Apps	Goals	Apps	Goals
C.S. Visé	2013–14	Belgian Second Division	1	0	0	0	0	0	1	0
C.S. Visé	2014–15	Belgian Third Division	14	0	0	0	3 (Note: Appearance(s) in Belgian Third Division play-offs)	0	14	0
C.S. Visé	Total		15	0	0	0	3	0	18	0
Alemannia Aachen II	2015–16	Mittelrheinliga	4	0	—		0	0	4	0
R.F.C. Seraing	2016–17	Belgian First Amateur Division	5	0	0	0	0	0	5	0
MVV Maastricht	2018–19	Eerste Divisie	1	0	0	0	0	0	1	0
MVV Maastricht	2019–20	Eerste Divisie	9	0	0	0	0	0	9	0
MVV Maastricht	Total		10	0	0	0	0	0	10	0
Career total			34	0	0	0	3	0	37	0
