= 2023–24 Sparta Rotterdam season =

Season of Dutch football club

Sparta Rotterdam
2023–24 season
- Chairman: Leo Ruijs
- Head coach: Jeroen Rijsdijk
- Stadium: Sparta Stadion Het Kasteel
- Eredivisie: 8th
- KNVB Cup: Second round
- Top goalscorer: League: Tobias Lauritsen (12); All: Tobias Lauritsen (13)
- Highest home attendance: 11,000 vs PSV
- Lowest home attendance: 10,111 vs NEC
- Average home league attendance: 10,555
- Biggest win: 4–1 vs FC Volendam (12 November 2023)
- Biggest defeat: 0–4 vs PSV Eindhoven (8 October 2023)
Home colours	Away colours

The 2023–24 season was Sparta Rotterdam's 136th season in existence and fifth consecutive in the Eredivisie. They also competed in the KNVB Cup.

== Players ==
=== First-team squad ===
As of 1 February 2024

Note: Flags indicate national team as defined under FIFA eligibility rules; some limited exceptions apply. Players may hold more than one non-FIFA nationality.

No.	Pos.	Nation	Player
—	GK	NED	Nick Olij
—	DF	NED	Mike Eerdhuijzen
—	MF	NOR	Joshua Kitolano
—	MF	COD	Metinho
—	FW	NOR	Tobias Lauritsen
—	MF	BEL	Arno Verschueren
—	FW	JPN	Koki Saito (on loan from Lommel)
—	DF	NED	Dylan van Wageningen
—	MF	ALG	Camiel Neghli
—	MF	JPN	Shunsuke Mito
—	DF	NED	Jeremy van Mullem
—	FW	NED	Mohammed Tahiri

No.	Pos.	Nation	Player
—	MF	ESP	Pedro Alemañ
—	GK	NED	Delano van Crooij
—	GK	GER	Kaylen Reitmaier
—	DF	COM	Saïd Bakari
—	DF	SUR	Djevencio van der Kust
—	DF	ESP	Sergi Rosanas
—	DF	NED	Tijs Velthuis
—	DF	NED	Django Warmerdam
—	MF	NED	Pelle Clement
—	MF	BRA	Metinho
—	FW	USA	Agustin Anello
—	FW	CAN	Charles-Andreas Brym
—	FW	TUR	Mehmet Yüksel

=== Out on loan ===
Note: Flags indicate national team as defined under FIFA eligibility rules; some limited exceptions apply. Players may hold more than one non-FIFA nationality.

No.	Pos.	Nation	Player
—	MF	NED	Patrick Brouwer (at Emmen until 30 June 2024)

== Transfers ==
=== In ===
Pos.	Player	Transferred from	Fee	Date	Source
MF	(Comoros) Saïd Bakari	(Netherlands) RKC Waalwijk	Free	1 July 2023	
DF	(Netherlands) Django Warmerdam	(Netherlands) FC Utrecht	Free	1 July 2023	
MF	(Netherlands) Pelle Clement	(Netherlands) RKC Waalwijk	Free	1 July 2023	
DF	(Suriname) Djevencio van der Kust	(Netherlands) FC Utrecht	Undisclosed	10 August 2023	
MF	[[ (Brazil) Metinho]]	(France) Troyes			

=== Out ===
Pos.	Player	Transferred to	Fee	Date	Source
DF	(Netherlands) Aaron Meijers	(Netherlands) RKC Waalwijk	Free	1 July 2023	
FW	(Netherlands) Vito van Crooij	(Saudi Arabia) Al-Wehda	Unknown	31 August 2023	

== Pre-season and friendlies ==
Win Draw Loss Fixtures

14 July 2023 Friendly	Sparta Rotterdam (Netherlands)	3–1	(Netherlands) PEC Zwolle
16:00 UTC+2	Van Crooij 6'; Saito 32'; Verschueren 48'		Vellios 103'
Note: Four periods of 30 minutes.

22 July 2023 Friendly	Sparta Rotterdam (Netherlands)	4–0	(Belgium) Zulte Waregem	Goes, Netherlands
14:00 UTC+2	Verschueren 16'; Clement 44'; Saito 57'; Anello 89'			Stadium: Sportpark Het Schenge

25 July 2023 Friendly	Sparta Rotterdam (Netherlands)	1–4	(South Africa) Mamelodi Sundowns	Zeist
15:00 UTC+2	Yüksel 74'		Shalulile 23', 35'; Ribeiro 57'; Maseko 81'	Stadium: KNVB Sportcentrum

29 July 2023 Friendly	Willem II (Netherlands)	0–3	(Netherlands) Sparta Rotterdam	Tilburg
13:00 UTC+2			Verschueren 7'; Lauritsen 87'; Saito 88'	Stadium: Koning Willem II Stadion

1 August 2023 Friendly	ADO Den Haag (Netherlands)	1–2	(Netherlands) Sparta Rotterdam	Rijswijk
14:30 UTC+2				Stadium: Sportpark Prinses Irene

5 August 2023 Friendly	Sparta Rotterdam (Netherlands)	1–0	(Netherlands) RKC Waalwijk	Rotterdam
13:00 UTC+2	69'			Stadium: Sparta Stadion Het Kasteel

== Competitions ==
=== Overall record ===
Competition	First match	Last match	Starting round	Record							
Competition	First match	Last match	Starting round	Pld	W	D	L	GF	GA	GD	Win %
Eredivisie	12 August 2023	19 May 2024	Matchday 1	34	14	7	13	51	48	+3	41.18
KNVB Cup	1 November 2023		First round	2	1	0	1	2	2	+0	50.00
Total				36	15	7	14	53	50	+3	41.67

Last updated: 19 May 2024
Source: Soccerway

=== Eredivisie ===
==== League table ====
Pos	Team	Pld	W	D	L	GF	GA	GD	Pts	Qualification or relegation
6	NEC	34	14	11	9	68	51	+17	53	Qualification for the European competition play-offs
7	Utrecht	34	13	11	10	49	47	+2	50	Qualification for the European competition play-offs
8	Sparta Rotterdam	34	14	7	13	51	48	+3	49	Qualification for the European competition play-offs
9	Go Ahead Eagles (O)	34	12	10	12	47	46	+1	46	Qualification for the European competition play-offs
10	Fortuna Sittard	34	9	11	14	37	56	−19	38	

Source: Eredivisie
Rules for classification: Season in progress: 1) Most points won; 2) Less points lost; 3) Goal difference; 4) Goals scored; 5) Alphabetical order; End of season: 1) Points; 2) Goal difference; 3) Goals scored; 4) Head-to-head points; 5) Head-to-head goal difference; 6) Head-to-head away goals scored; 7) Play-off if relevant for deciding champion, relegation or participating in a European league, otherwise by draw. 8) Penalty shoot-out (only after a play-off)
(O) Play-off winners

==== Results summary ====
Overall								Home						Away					
Pld	W	D	L	GF	GA	GD	Pts	W	D	L	GF	GA	GD	W	D	L	GF	GA	GD
34	14	7	13	51	47	+4	49	6	5	6	25	24	+1	8	2	7	26	23	+3

Last updated: 19 May 2024.

==== Results by round ====
Round	1	2	3	4	5	6	7	8	9	10	11	12	13	14	15	16	17	18	19	20	21	22	23	24	25	26	27	28	29	30	31	32	33	34
Ground	A	H	A	H	A	H	A	H	A	H	H	A	H	A	A	H	A	H	A	H	A	H	A	H	A	H	H	A	H	A	H	A	A	H
Result	W	D	W	D	L	W	L	L	D	W	L	W	L	W	L	D	W	L	D	L	L	W	L	D	L	D	W	W	L	W	W	L	W	W
Position	7	7	1	5	6	5	6	7	7	6	6	6	6	6	7	7	6	8	8	9	10	8	9	10	11	10	9	9	9	9	9	9	9	8

Updated to match(es) played on 19 May 2024. Source:
A = Away; H = Home; W = Win; D = Draw; L = Loss

==== Matches ====
The league fixtures were unveiled on 30 June 2023.

12 August 2023 1	PEC Zwolle	1–2	Sparta Rotterdam	Zwolle
21:00 UTC+2	Thy 82'; Vellios (yellow card) 90+5'; Kersten (yellow card) 90+7'	Report	Kersten 13' (o.g.); Warmerdam (yellow card) 33'; De Guzmán (yellow card) 54'; Kitolano (yellow card) 57'; Bakari (yellow card) 68'; Lauritsen 70'	Stadium: MAC³PARK Stadion; Attendance: 12,500; Referee: Joey Kooij

20 August 2023 2	Sparta Rotterdam	2–2	Feyenoord	Rotterdam
14:30 UTC+2	Brym 40', 54'; Van Crooij (yellow card) 42'; Van Mullem (yellow card) 90+3'	Report	Giménez 77'; Sauer 90+1'	Stadium: Sparta Stadion Het Kasteel; Attendance: 11,000; Referee: Danny Makkelie

27 August 2023 3	SC Heerenveen	1–3	Sparta Rotterdam	Heerenveen
16:45 UTC+2	Bochniewicz 71'; Haye (red card) 90+3'	Report	Lauritsen 34'; Saito 53', 62'	Stadium: Abe Lenstra Stadion; Attendance: 19,700; Referee: Allard Lindhout

1 September 2023 4	Sparta Rotterdam	1–1	NEC	Rotterdam
20:00 UTC+2	Verschueren (yellow card) 16'; Kitolano 81'	Report	Nuytinck (yellow card) 8'; Proper 56'; Baas (yellow card) 65'; Netten (yellow card) 67'; González (yellow card) 70'	Stadium: Sparta Stadion Het Kasteel; Attendance: 10,111; Referee: Serdar Gözübüyük

17 September 2023 5	AZ	2-0	Sparta Rotterdam	Alkmaar
16:45 UTC+2	de Wit 18'; Pavlidis 19'	Report	Arno Verscheuren (yellow card) 39'; Saïd Bakari (yellow card) 43'; Djevencio van der Kust (yellow card) 81'	Stadium: AFAS Stadion; Attendance: unknown Referee: Pol van Boekel

24 September 2023 6	Sparta Rotterdam	1-0	Vitesse	Rotterdam
12:15 UTC+2	Verschueren 5'; Bakari (yellow card) 59'	Report	Cornelisse (yellow card) 65'; Carlens (yellow card) 85'	Stadium: Sparta Stadion Het Kasteel; Attendance: 10,121; Referee: Richard Martens

1 October 2023 7	Excelsior	2-1	Sparta Rotterdam	Rotterdam
14:30 UTC+2	El Yaakoubi (yellow card) 2'; Driouech (yellow card) 45'; Zagré 73', (yellow card) 75'; Parrott 90+3', (yellow card) 90+3'	Report	de Guzmán 59'; Vriends (yellow card) 90'	Stadium: Stadion Woudestein; Attendance: 4 400; Referee: Jeroen Manschot

8 October 2023 8	Sparta Rotterdam	0-4	PSV	Rotterdam
16:45 UTC+2	de Guzmán (yellow card) 45+1'; Brym (yellow card) 45+1'; Neghli (yellow card) 54'	Report	Tillman 51'; Bakayoko 59'; Vertessen 80'; de Jong 88', 88'; Dest (yellow card) 90'	Stadium: Sparta Stadion Het Kasteel; Attendance: 11,000; Referee: Dennis Higler

22 October 2023 9	Go Ahead Eagles	0-0	Sparta Rotterdam	Deventer
16:45 UTC+2		Report		Stadium: De Adelaarshorst; Attendance: 9,837; Referee: Ingmar Oostrom

28 October 2023 10	Sparta Rotterdam	2-0	RKC Waalwijk	Rotterdam
20:00 UTC+2	Clement (yellow card) 39'; Lauritsen 54', (yellow card) 70'; Verschueren 64', (red card) 67'	Report	Roemeratoe (yellow card) 18'	Stadium: Sparta Stadion Het Kasteel; Attendance: 10,341; Referee: Sander van der Eijk

5 November 2023 11	Sparta Rotterdam	1-2	Almere City	Rotterdam
16:45 UTC+1	Kitolano 84'	Report	Robinet 12'; Hansen 76'	Stadium: Sparta Stadion Het Kasteel; Attendance: 10,132; Referee: Allard Lindhout

12 November 2023 12	FC Volendam	1–4	Sparta Rotterdam	Volendam
14:30 UTC+1	de Haan 13'	Report	Vriends 6', 87'; Velthuis (yellow card) 37'; Kitolano 42'; Verschueren 90+1'	Stadium: Kras Stadion; Attendance: 6,784; Referee: Richard Martens

26 November 2023 13	Sparta Rotterdam	1–2	FC Utrecht	Rotterdam
16:45 UTC+1	Neghli 43'	Report	Seuntjens 5'; Leliendal (yellow card) 40'; Lidberg 54'; Barkas (yellow card) 71'; Boussaid (yellow card) 76'	Stadium: Sparta Stadion Het Kasteel; Attendance: 10,030; Referee: Joey Kooij

2 December 2023 14	Heracles	0–1	Sparta Rotterdam	Almelo
21:00 UTC+1	Ouahim (yellow card) 44'	Report	Kitolano 62'	Stadium: Erve Asito; Attendance: 11,645; Referee: Edwin van de Graaf

9 December 2023 15	Ajax	2–1	Sparta Rotterdam	Amsterdam
18:45 UTC+1	Brobbey 8'; Bergwijn 42' (pen.)	Report	Neghli 55'; de Guzmán (yellow card) 68'	Stadium: Johan Cruijff Arena; Attendance: 54,526; Referee: Danny Makkelie

17 December 2023 16	Sparta Rotterdam	2–2	Twente	Rotterdam
18:45 UTC+1	de Guzmán (yellow card) 35'; Bakari (red card) 45+3'; Lauritsen 51' (pen.), 55' (pen.); Velthuis (yellow card) 72'	Report	Steijn 45+4'; Sadílek (yellow card) 53'; Ünüvar 90+1'	Stadium: Sparta Stadion Het Kasteel; Attendance: 10,289; Referee: Martin van den Kerkhof

13 January 2024 17	Fortuna Sittard	0–2	Sparta Rotterdam	Sittard
16:30 UTC+1	Halilović (yellow card) 50'; Belkheir 88'; Peterson (yellow card) 90+2'; Rosier (yellow card) 90+3'	Report	Mito 33'; van der Kust (yellow card) 37'; Metinho 48'	Stadium: Fortuna Sittard Stadion; Attendance: 9,800; Referee: Erwin Blank

21 January 2024 18	Sparta Rotterdam	0–2	Go Ahead Eagles	Rotterdam
14:30 UTC+1		Report	Willumsson 7'; Kuipers (yellow card) 27'; Adekanye (yellow card) 45+1'; Victor Edvardsen 51' (pen.); Amofa (yellow card) 55'	Stadium: Sparta Stadion Het Kasteel; Attendance: 10,078; Referee: Danny Makkelie

27 January 2024 19	RKC Waalwijk	1–1	Sparta Rotterdam	Waalwijk
18:45 UTC+1	Gaari (yellow card) 8'; Verschueren 53' (o.g.); Kramer (yellow card) 54'; Van den Buijs (yellow card) 55'	Report	Metinho (yellow card) 46'; Verschueren (yellow card) 57'; Kitolano 82' (pen.)	Stadium: Mandemakers Stadion; Attendance: 6,517; Referee: Alex Bos

4 February 2024 20	Sparta Rotterdam	0–2	PEC Zwolle	Rotterdam
16:45 UTC+1	Eerdhuijzen (yellow card) 17'	Report	Lam 26'; Rooij (yellow card) 53'; Fichtinger (yellow card) 64'; van den Berg 70'; Velanas (yellow card) 85'	Stadium: Sparta Stadion Het Kasteel; Attendance: 9,446; Referee: Jeroen Manschot

11 February 2024 21	Feyenoord	2–0	Sparta Rotterdam	Rotterdam
20:00 UTC+1	Hancko 57'; Geertruida 63'	Report	Clement (yellow card) 34'; Metinho (yellow card) 86'	Stadium: De Kuip; Attendance: 47,500; Referee: Pol van Boekel

17 February 2024 22	Sparta Rotterdam	4–2	Excelsior	Rotterdam
18:45 UTC+1	Verschueren 24'; Lauritsen 31', 75'; Clement (yellow card) 51'; de Guzmán (yellow card) 56'; Vriends (yellow card) 63'; van der Kust (yellow card) 66'; Brym 90+5'	Report	Pierie 11'; Duijvestijn 16'; Omorowa (yellow card) 90+1'; Horemans (yellow card) 90+2'	Stadium: Sparta Stadion Het Kasteel; Attendance: 10,459; Referee: Serdar Gözübüyük

24 February 2024 23	NEC	2–0	Sparta Rotterdam	Nijmegen
21:00 UTC+1	Proper 32'; Verdonk 36'; Hansen (yellow card) 82'	Report	Vriends (yellow card) 44'; Kitolano (yellow card) 45'; van der Kust (yellow card) 90+1'; el Dahri (yellow card) 90+4'	Stadium: Goffertstadion; Attendance: 12,500; Referee: Dennis Higler

2 March 2024 24	Sparta Rotterdam	1–1	AZ	Rotterdam
21:00 UTC+1	Verschueren 74'	Report	Sugawara 25'	Stadium: Sparta Stadion Het Kasteel; Referee: Jochem Kamphuis

9 March 2024 25	FC Twente	2–1	Sparta Rotterdam	Enschede
18:45 CET (UTC+1)	Rots 21'; Boadu 77'	Report	Clement 87'	Stadium: De Grolsch Veste; Referee: Rob Dieperink

17 March 2024 26	Sparta Rotterdam	2–2	Ajax	Rotterdam
16:45 CET (UTC+1)	Verschueren 28', 47'	Report	Akpom 65'; Bergwijn 88'; Taylor (yellow card) 89'; Kaplan (red card) 90+4'	Stadium: Sparta Stadion Het Kasteel; Attendance: 10,599; Referee: Serdar Gözübüyük

30 March 2024 27	Sparta Rotterdam	4–0	Fortuna Sittard	Rotterdam
18:45 CET (UTC+1)	Verschueren 28'; Lauritsen 58', 88'; Neghli 90+1'	Report		Stadium: Sparta Stadion Het Kasteel; Attendance: 9,353; Referee: Martin van den Kerkhof

2 April 2024 28	Vitesse	1–4	Sparta Rotterdam	Arnhem
18:45 CET (UTC+2)	Kozłowski 45+1'; Aaronson (yellow card) 57'	Report	Mito 7'; Clement 19'; Saito 43'; Eerdhuijzen 58'	Stadium: GelreDome; Attendance: 15,726; Referee: Edwin van de Graaf

6 April 2024 29	Sparta Rotterdam	1–2	Heracles Almelo	Rotterdam
16:30 CET (UTC+2)	Brym 42'; Metinho (yellow card) 61'	Report	Scheperman (yellow card) 19'; Hoogma 48', (yellow card) 90+7'; Bruns (yellow card) 55'; Hornkamp 73'	Stadium: Sparta Stadion Het Kasteel; Attendance: 9,820; Referee: Laurens Gerrets

13 April 2024 30	Almere City	2–3	Sparta Rotterdam	Almere
21:00 CEST (UTC+2)	Cathline 5'; Robinet 87'	Report	Lauritsen 19'; van der Kust 28'; Verschueren 88'	Stadium: Yanmar Stadion; Referee: Alex Bos

28 April 2024 31	Sparta Rotterdam	1–0	FC Volendam	Rotterdam
14:00 CEST (UTC+2)	de Guzmán (yellow card) 45'; Lauritsen 75'	Report	Le Roux (yellow card) 35'; Cox (yellow card) 57'	Stadium: Sparta Stadion Het Kasteel; Attendance: 10,021; Referee: Jeroen Manschot

5 May 2024 32	PSV	4–2	Sparta Rotterdam	Eindhoven
12:15 CEST (UTC+2)	Bakari 19' (o.g.); Bakayoko 26'; Boscagli 67'; Teze 78'	Report	Metinho 8'; Boscagli 29' (o.g.); Lauritsen (yellow card) 66'	Stadium: Philips Stadion; Attendance: 34,000; Referee: Dennis Higler

12 May 2024 33	FC Utrecht	0–1	Sparta Rotterdam	Utrecht
14:30 CEST (UTC+2)	ter Avest (yellow card) 23'	Report	Neghli 68'	Stadium: Stadion Galgenwaard; Attendance: 22,270; Referee: Jannick van der Laan

19 May 2024 34	Sparta Rotterdam	2–1	SC Heerenveen	Rotterdam
14:30 CEST (UTC+2)	Neghli 57'; Lauritsen 73'	Report	Braude (yellow card) 59'; Köhlert (yellow card) 83'; Bochniewicz 90+1'	Stadium: Sparta Stadion Het Kasteel; Attendance: 10,272; Referee: Sander van der Eijk

=== KNVB Cup ===
1 November 2023 First round	IJsselmeervogels	0–2	Sparta Rotterdam	Spakenburg
20:00 CET (UTC+1)	Wessel Boer (yellow card) 80'; van der Velden (yellow card) 38'; Bäly (yellow card) 90'	Report	Neghli 37'; Anello (yellow card) 59'; Brym 88'	Stadium: Sportpark De Westmaat; Referee: Joey Kooij

20 December 2023 Second round	ADO Den Haag	2–0	Sparta Rotterdam	The Hague
18:45 CET (UTC+1)	van Mieghem 5'; Komljenovic (yellow card) 42'; Ideho 88'	Report	Velthuis (yellow card) 38'; Warmerdam (yellow card) 40'; Verschueren (yellow card) 62'; Rosario (yellow card) 90+2'	Stadium: ADO Den Haag Stadium; Attendance: 15,000; Referee: Ingmar Oostrom

=== Play-offs ===
23 May 2024 Semi-final	FC Utrecht	3–1	Sparta Rotterdam	Utrecht
21:00 CEST (UTC+2)	Flamingo 41'; Lammers 70'; Jensen 90+3', (yellow card) 90+3'	Report	Clement (yellow card) 35'; Lauritsen 38'; Metinho (yellow card) 90+5'	Stadium: Stadion Galgenwaard; Attendance: 20,092; Referee: Danny Makkelie
