= 2022–23 Sparta Rotterdam season =

Sparta Rotterdam
2022–23 season
- Chairman: Leo Ruijs
- Head coach: Maurice Steijn
- Stadium: Het Kasteel
- Eredivisie: 6th
- KNVB Cup: Second Round
- Top goalscorer: League: Vito van Crooij (9); All: Arno Verschueren; Vito van Crooij (9 each)

The 2022–23 is the 135th season in the existence of Sparta Rotterdam and the club's fourth consecutive season in the top flight of Dutch football. In addition to the domestic league, Sparta Rotterdam participated in this season's edition of the KNVB Cup.

== Players ==
=== First-team squad ===
As of 6 August 2022
As of 22 July 2022

Note: Flags indicate national team as defined under FIFA eligibility rules; some limited exceptions apply. Players may hold more than one non-FIFA nationality.

No.	Pos.	Nation	Player
1	GK	NED	Nick Olij
—	GK	NED	Tim Coremans
—	GK	NED	Youri Schoonderwaldt
12	DF	NED	Dirk Abels
—	DF	NED	Mike Eerdhuijzen
—	DF	LUX	Laurent Jans
—	DF	NED	Aaron Meijers
—	DF	LUX	Mica Pinto
—	DF	NED	Bart Vriends
—	MF	NED	Adil Auassar (captain)

No.	Pos.	Nation	Player
6	MF	NED	Jonathan de Guzmán
—	MF	NOR	Joshua Kitolano
—	MF	NED	Sven Mijnans
—	MF	DEN	Younes Namli
16	MF	JPN	Koki Saito (on loan from Lommel)
10	MF	BEL	Arno Verschueren
—	MF	ESP	Pedro Alemañ
—	FW	CAN	Charles-Andreas Brym
11	FW	NED	Vito van Crooij
9	FW	NOR	Tobias Lauritsen
—	FW	COD	Jason Lokilo

=== Reserve squad ===
Note: Flags indicate national team as defined under FIFA eligibility rules; some limited exceptions apply. Players may hold more than one non-FIFA nationality.

No.	Pos.	Nation	Player
—	GK	NED	Jomar Gomes
—	GK	SUR	Ishan Kort
—	GK	NED	Finn Murre
—	DF	TOG	Augustin Drakpe
—	DF	MAR	Farouq Limouri
—	DF	NED	Jeremy van Mullem
—	DF	NED	Tariq Dilrosun
—	DF	NED	Gaultiér Overman
—	DF	NED	Jay den Haan
—	DF	NED	Yanilio de Nooijer
—	DF	NED	Joshua Adney
—	MF	NED	Constantijn Schop
—	MF	NED	Delano Vianello

No.	Pos.	Nation	Player
—	MF	NED	Jason Meerstadt
—	MF	NED	Jeremy Udenhout
—	MF	MAS	Dylan van Wageningen
—	MF	NED	Patrick Brouwer
—	MF	NED	Achraf Madi
—	MF	NED	Marcus Scholten
—	FW	NED	Marouane Afaker
—	FW	NED	Mohamed el Karbachi
—	FW	NED	Mike Frimpong
—	FW	NED	Aaron Bashir
—	FW	NED	Shairon de Wind
—	FW	MAR	Mohammed Tahiri
—	FW	NED	Pepijn Doesburg

=== Players out on loan ===
Note: Flags indicate national team as defined under FIFA eligibility rules; some limited exceptions apply. Players may hold more than one non-FIFA nationality.

No.	Pos.	Nation	Player

== Transfers ==
=== In ===
Pos	Player	Transferred from	Fee
MF	(Norway) Joshua Kitolano	(Norway) Odds BK	€610,000
FW	(Norway) Tobias Lauritsen	(Norway) Odds BK	€450,000
FW	(Canada) Charles-Andreas Brym	(Netherlands) FC Eindhoven	€250,000
MF	(Denmark) Younes Namli	(Russia) FC Krasnodar	Free transfer
DF	(Netherlands) Mike Eerdhuijzen	(Netherlands) FC Volendam	Free transfer
MF	(Netherlands) Jonathan de Guzmán	(Greece) OFI	Free transfer
GK	(Netherlands) Youri Schoonderwaldt	(Netherlands) ADO Den Haag	Undisclosed
GK	(Netherlands) Nick Olij	(Netherlands) NAC Breda	Undisclosed
MF	(Belgium) Arno Verschueren	(Belgium) Lommel SK	Undisclosed
FW	(Democratic Republic of the Congo) Jason Lokilo	(Poland) GKS Górnik Łęczna	Undisclosed
DF	(Tunisia) Omar Rekik	(England) Arsenal	Loan transfer
FW	(Japan) Koki Saito	(Belgium) Lommel SK	Loan transfer
DF	(Netherlands) Shurandy Sambo	(Netherlands) PSV	Loan transfer

=== Out ===
Pos	Player	Transferred from	Fee
MF	(Netherlands) Abdou Harroui	(Italy) Sassuolo	€3,000,000
FW	(Germany) Lennart Thy	(Netherlands) PEC Zwolle	Free transfer
DF	(Netherlands) Tom Beugelsdijk	(Netherlands) PEC Zwolle	Free transfer
DF	(Belgium) Michaël Heylen	(Netherlands) FC Emmen	Free transfer
FW	(Netherlands) Reda Kharchouch	(Netherlands) Excelsior	Undisclosed
FW	(Spain) Adrián Dalmau	Released	Free transfer
GK	(Netherlands) Benjamin van Leer	Released	Free transfer

== Pre-season and friendlies ==
Win Draw Loss

12 July 2022 Friendly	Quick '20	0–3	Sparta Rotterdam	Oldenzaal
16:00 CEST (UTC+2)		Report

15 July 2022 Friendly	Sparta Rotterdam	1–0	Heracles Almelo	Rotterdam
16:00 CEST (UTC+2)		Report

20 July 2022 Friendly	Willem II	0–2	Sparta Rotterdam	Tilburg
13:00 CEST (UTC+2)

23 July 2022 Friendly	Beerschot	1–0	Sparta Rotterdam
CEST (UTC+2)

26 July 2022 Friendly	VOC	1–5	Sparta Rotterdam	Rotterdam
19:00 CEST (UTC+2)

30 July 2022 Friendly	Sparta Rotterdam	3–1	FC Emmen	Rotterdam
12:00 CEST (UTC+2)				Stadium: Het Kasteel

4 December 2022 Friendly	ADO Den Haag	0–3	Sparta Rotterdam
13:00 CET (UTC+1)			Eyenga-Lokilo 2', 88'; Tahiri 24'

10 December 2022 Friendly	FC Twente	2–1	Sparta Rotterdam	Enschede
16:30 CET (UTC+1)	van Wolfswinkel 38'; Clonise 84'		Meijers 16'	Stadium: De Grolsch Veste

17 December 2022 Friendly	Spezia	1–3	Sparta Rotterdam	Oliva
14:00 CET (UTC+1)	Gyasi 90+10'		Verschueren 31'; Saito 67'; Tahiri 90+12'	Stadium: Oliva Nova Golf & Beach Resort

22 December 2022 Friendly	Sparta Rotterdam	1–0	Vitesse	Rotterdam
13:00 CET (UTC+1)				Stadium: Sparta Stadion Het Kasteel

30 December 2022 Friendly	Westerlo	2–1	Sparta Rotterdam	Belgium
20:00 CET (UTC+1)

== Competitions ==
=== Overall record ===
Competition	First match	Last match	Starting round	Final position	Record							
Competition	First match	Last match	Starting round	Final position	Pld	W	D	L	GF	GA	GD	Win %
Eredivisie	5 August 2022	28 May 2023	Matchday 1	6th	34	17	8	9	60	37	+23	50.00
KNVB Cup	21 October 2022	10 January 2023	First round	Second round	2	1	0	1	4	3	+1	50.00
Total					36	18	8	10	64	40	+24	50.00

Last updated: 28 May 2023
Source: Competitions

=== Eredivisie ===
==== League table ====
Pos	Team	Pld	W	D	L	GF	GA	GD	Pts	Qualification or relegation
4	AZ	34	20	7	7	68	35	+33	67	Qualification to Europa Conference League third qualifying round
5	Twente (O)	34	18	10	6	66	27	+39	64	Qualification to European competition play-offs
6	Sparta Rotterdam	34	17	8	9	60	37	+23	59	Qualification to European competition play-offs
7	Utrecht	34	15	9	10	55	50	+5	54	Qualification to European competition play-offs
8	Heerenveen	34	12	10	12	44	50	−6	46	Qualification to European competition play-offs

Source: Eredivisie
Rules for classification: Season in progress: 1) Most points won; 2) Less points lost; 3) Goal difference; 4) Goals scored; 5) Alphabetical order; End of season: 1) Points; 2) Goal difference; 3) Goals scored; 4) Head-to-head points; 5) Head-to-head goal difference; 6) Head-to-head away goals scored; 7) Play-off if relevant for deciding champion, relegation or participating in a European league, otherwise by draw. 8) Penalty shoot-out (only after a play-off)
(O) Play-off Winner

==== Results summary ====
Overall								Home						Away					
Pld	W	D	L	GF	GA	GD	Pts	W	D	L	GF	GA	GD	W	D	L	GF	GA	GD
34	17	8	9	60	37	+23	59	10	2	5	32	18	+14	7	6	4	28	19	+9

Last updated: 28 May 2023.
Source: Eredivisie

==== Results by round ====
Round	1	2	3	4	5	6	7	8	9	10	11	12	13	14	15	16	17	18	19	20	21	22	23	24	25	26	27	28	29	30	31	32	33	34
Ground	A	H	H	A	H	A	H	A	H	H	A	H	A	H	A	H	A	H	A	A	H	A	H	A	H	A	H	A	H	A	H	A	H	A
Result	D	L	L	W	W	L	W	D	W	W	L	W	W	D	D	W	W	D	D	D	W	L	L	W	W	W	L	W	W	D	L	L	W	W
Position	12	11	14	11	7	11	7	8	6	6	6	6	6	6	6	6	6	6	6	6	6	6	6	6	6	6	6	6	5	5	5	6	6	6

Updated to match(es) played on 28 May 2023. Source: Eredivisie
A = Away; H = Home; W = Win; D = Draw; L = Loss

==== Matches ====
The league fixtures were announced on 17 June 2022.

5 August 2022 1	SC Heerenveen	0–0	Sparta Rotterdam	Heerenveen
CEST (UTC+2)	van Hooijdonk (yellow card) 25'	Report	Verschueren (yellow card) 49'	Stadium: Abe Lenstra Stadion; Attendance: 18.000; Referee: Pol van Boekel

14 August 2022 2	Sparta Rotterdam	2–3	AZ	Rotterdam
16:45 CEST (UTC+2)	van Crooij 1', (yellow card) 38', (goal) 59'; Verschueren (yellow card) 36'	Report	Bruno Martins Indi (yellow card) 38'; de Wit (yellow card) 38', (goal) 57'; Kerkez 65'; Pavlidis 45+1' (pen.)	Stadium: Sparta Stadion Het Kasteel; Attendance: 9.631; Referee: Jannick van der Laan

21 August 2022 3	Sparta Rotterdam	0–1	Ajax	Rotterdam
14:30 CEST (UTC+2)	de Guzmán (yellow card) 14'	Report	Álvarez (yellow card) 32'; Bergwijn 37'	Stadium: Sparta Stadion Het Kasteel; Attendance: 10.606; Referee: Jeroen Manschot

27 August 2022 4	Go Ahead Eagles	0–1	Sparta Rotterdam	Deventer
16:30 CEST (UTC+2)	Rashaan Fernandes (red card) 57'; Bakker (yellow card) 90+1'	Report	Lauritsen 18'; Sambo (yellow card) 57'; Mica Pinto (yellow card) 88'	Stadium: De Adelaarshorst; Attendance: 9.317; Referee: Jochem Kamphuis

3 September 2022 5	Sparta Rotterdam	4–0	FC Volendam	Rotterdam
20:00 CEST (UTC+2)	van Crooij 14'; Lauritsen 68', 72'; Mijnans 85'	Report		Stadium: Sparta Stadion Het Kasteel; Attendance: 10.050; Referee: Edwin van de Graaf

11 September 2022 6	Feyenoord	3–0	Sparta Rotterdam	Rotterdam
20:00 CEST (UTC+2)	Kökcü 5'; Dilrosun 35'; Giménez 73'	Report		Stadium: De Kuip; Attendance: 47.500; Referee: Martin van den Kerkhof

17 September 2022 7	Sparta Rotterdam	2–1	Groningen	Rotterdam
16:30 CEST (UTC+2)	Mijnans 73'; van Crooij 90' (pen.)	Report	Balker (yellow card) 28'; Pepi 61'; Šverko (yellow card) 79'; Verrips (yellow card) 84'	Stadium: Sparta Stadion Het Kasteel; Attendance: 9.657; Referee: Danny Makkelie

2 October 2022 8	RKC Waalwijk	2–2	Sparta Rotterdam	Waalwijk
16:30 CEST (UTC+2)	Kramer 10'; Bel Hassani 60', (yellow card) 67'; Adewoye (yellow card) 90'	Report	Verschueren 35', 75'; Sambo (red card) 62'; Šverko (yellow card) 79'	Stadium: Mandemakers Stadion; Attendance: 5.647; Referee: Ingmar Oostrom

8 October 2022 9	Sparta Rotterdam	3–1	FC Emmen	Rotterdam
18:45 CEST (UTC+2)	van Crooij 13'; Abels (yellow card) 21'; Lauritsen (yellow card) 47'; Vriends 82'; Verschueren (yellow card) 90+1'; Engels 90+5', (yellow card) 90+5'	Report	Romeny 51'; Araujo (yellow card) 61' (yellow-red card) 69'; Assehnoun (yellow card) 90+7'	Stadium: Sparta Stadion Het Kasteel; Attendance: 10.087; Referee: Pol van Boekel

16 October 2022 10	Sparta Rotterdam	2–0	N.E.C.	Rotterdam
12:15 CEST (UTC+2)	Abels 7'; de Guzmán 29'; van Crooij (yellow card) 79'; Lauritsen (yellow card) 85'	Report	El Karouani (yellow card) 25'; Tannane (yellow card) 62'; Verdonk (yellow card) 79'	Stadium: Sparta Stadion Het Kasteel; Attendance: 10.420; Referee: Robin Hensgens

23 October 2022 11	Utrecht	3–1	Sparta Rotterdam	Utrecht
16:45 CEST (UTC+2)	Redan 6'; Douvikas 48'; Klaiber 80'	Report	Kitolano 84'; van Crooij (yellow card) 90+2'; Eerdhuijzen (yellow card) 90+4'	Stadium: Stadion Galgenwaard; Attendance: 10.048; Referee: Bas Nijhuis

29 October 2022 12	Sparta Rotterdam	3–1	Fortuna Sittard	Rotterdam
18:45 CEST (UTC+2)	Vriends (yellow card) 18'; Verschueren 26'; van Crooij 54', 83'	Report	Nosliin 19'; Navarro (yellow card) 53'; Yılmaz (yellow card) 72'	Stadium: Sparta Stadion Het Kasteel; Attendance: 10.221; Referee: Serdar Gözübüyük

5 November 2022 13	Vitesse	0–4	Sparta Rotterdam	Arnhem
16:30 CET (UTC+1)	Tronstad (yellow card) 7'	Report	Lauritsen 69', 88'; Mijnans 72'; Verschueren 90+1'	Stadium: GelreDome; Attendance: 16.493; Referee: Pol van Boekel

11 November 2022 14	Sparta Rotterdam	1–1	FC Twente	Rotterdam
20:00 CET (UTC+1)	Verschueren (yellow card) 60', (goal) 71'; Van Mullem (yellow card) 62'	Report	Steijn 63'	Stadium: Sparta Stadion Het Kasteel; Attendance: 10.606; Referee: Alex Bos

8 January 2023 15	PSV	0–0	Sparta Rotterdam	Eindhoven
21:00 CET (UTC+1)	Madueke (yellow card) 51'	Report	Vriends (yellow card) 45+1'; van Crooij (yellow card) 52'; Verschueren (yellow card) 70'	Stadium: Philips Stadion; Attendance: 33,421; Referee: Sander van der Eijk

14 January 2023 16	Sparta Rotterdam	1–0	Excelsior	Rotterdam
21:00 CET (UTC+1)	Van Mullem (yellow card) 23'; Kitolano 90+1'	Report	Van Duinen (yellow card) 90'	Stadium: Sparta Stadion Het Kasteel; Referee: Edwin van de Graaf

21 January 2023 17	SC Cambuur	0–3	Sparta Rotterdam	Cambuur
20:00 CET (UTC+1)	Schmidt (yellow card) 53'	Report	Lauritsen 9'; Saito 18'; van Crooij 51' (pen.)	Stadium: Cambuur Stadion; Attendance: 9,841; Referee: Jochem Kamphuis

24 January 2023 18	Sparta Rotterdam	0–0	RKC Waalwijk	Rotterdam
21:00 CET (UTC+1)		Report		Stadium: Sparta Stadion Het Kasteel; Attendance: 9,720; Referee: Danny Makkelie

28 January 2023 19	N.E.C.	1–1	Sparta Rotterdam	Nijmegen
20:00 CET (UTC+1)	Márquez (yellow card) 76'; Marques 80'	Report	Eerdhuijzen (yellow card) 56'; Verschueren 58'; Kitolano (yellow card) 84'	Stadium: Goffertstadion; Attendance: 12,500; Referee: Dennis Higler

3 February 2023 20	Fortuna Sittard	0–0	Sparta Rotterdam	Limburg
20:00 CET (UTC+1)		Report		Stadium: Fortuna Sittard Stadion; Attendance: 10,278; Referee: Allard Lindhout

12 February 2023 21	Sparta Rotterdam	2–1	Go Ahead Eagles	Rotterdam
12:15 CET (UTC+1)	van Crooij 4'; de Guzmán (yellow card) 26'; Lauritsen 58'	Report	Amofa (yellow card) 49'; Lidberg (yellow card) 51'; Stokkers 53'; Idzes (yellow card) 90+3'	Stadium: Sparta Stadion Het Kasteel; Attendance: 10.130; Referee: Jeroen Manschot

19 February 2023 22	Ajax	4–0	Sparta Rotterdam	Amsterdam
16:45 CET (UTC+1)	Tadić 6', 64' (pen.); Kudus 84'; Taylor 27'	Report	Rosario (yellow card) 90+2'	Stadium: Johan Cruyff Arena; Attendance: 54.410; Referee: Pol van Boekel

24 February 2023 23	Sparta Rotterdam	0–3	FC Utrecht	Rotterdam
20:00 CET (UTC+1)	Shurandy Sambo (yellow card) 38'; Adil Auassar (red card) 49'; de Guzmán (yellow card) 71'; Namli (yellow card) 90+2'	Report	Brouwers (yellow card) 27'; Sagnan (yellow card) 45+1'; Jensen 74'; Boussaid 88'; Descotte 89'; Ramselaar (yellow card) 90+5'	Stadium: Sparta Stadion Het Kasteel; Attendance: 10.321; Referee: Joey Kooij

5 March 2023 24	Excelsior	1–4	Sparta Rotterdam	Rotterdam
12:30 CET (UTC+1)	Driouech 45'	Report	El Yaakoubi 20' (o.g.); Saito 49'; Lauritsen 56'; Vriends 60'	Stadium: Stadion Woudestein; Attendance: 4.400; Referee: Bas Nijhuis

11 March 2023 25	Sparta Rotterdam	3–1	Vitesse	Rotterdam
21:00 CET (UTC+1)	Verschueren 11'; Saito 45'; Kitolano 87'	Report	Oroz 7'; Maximilian Wittek (yellow card) 18', (red card) 80'	Stadium: Sparta Stadion Het Kasteel; Attendance: 10.531; Referee: Laurens Gerrets

18 March 2023 26	Emmen	0–2	Sparta Rotterdam	Emmen
18:45 CET (UTC+1)		Report	Saito 44'; Kitolano (yellow card) 86'; van Crooij 89'; Eerdhuijzen (yellow card) 90+2'	Stadium: De Oude Meerdijk; Attendance: 8.274; Referee: Sander van den Eijk

2 April 2023 27	Sparta Rotterdam	1–3	Feyenoord	Rotterdam
14:30 CEST (UTC+2)	Verschueren (yellow card) 28'; Pinto 33'; van Crooij 45+3'	Report	Paixão 12'; Giménez 70'; Hancko 76'; Wieffer (yellow card) 78'	Stadium: Sparta Stadion Het Kasteel; Attendance: 10,606; Referee: Dennis Higler

8 April 2023 28	AZ	0–1	Sparta Rotterdam	Alkmaar
20:00 CEST (UTC+2)	Meerdink (yellow card) 45+3'; Lahdo (yellow card) 87'	Report	Lauritsen (yellow card) 22', (goal) 45+1'; Abels (yellow card) 83'	Stadium: AFAS Stadion; Attendance: 18,002; Referee: Danny Makkelie

15 April 2023 29	Sparta Rotterdam	4–0	SC Heerenveen	Rotterdam
21:00 CEST (UTC+2)	Pinto 39'; Namli 51'; Sambo 68'; Eerdhuijzen (yellow card) 73'; van Crooij 76'	Report	van Otelle (yellow card) 55'; Nunnely (yellow card) 90'	Stadium: Sparta Stadion Het Kasteel; Attendance: 10,420; Referee: Ingmar Oostrom

23 April 2023 30	FC Twente	3–3	Sparta Rotterdam	Enschede
12:15 CEST (UTC+2)	Brenet 22'; Abels 65' (o.g.); Černý 67'; Pröpper (yellow card) 90'	Report	Sambo (yellow card) 25' (red card); Lauritsen 32', 42', (yellow card) 72'; van Mullem (yellow card) 52'	Stadium: De Grolsch Veste; Attendance: 29,500; Referee: Joey Kooij

6 May 2023 31	Sparta Rotterdam	0–1	PSV	Rotterdam
18:45 CEST (UTC+2)	de Guzman (yellow card) 90+2'	Report	El Ghazi 74'; Simons (yellow card) 90+5'	Stadium: Sparta Stadion Het Kasteel; Attendance: 10,599; Referee: Jeroen Manschot

13 May 2023 32	FC Volendam	2–1	Sparta Rotterdam	Volendam
18:45 CEST (UTC+2)	mbuyamba 37', 90+1'; Antonucci (yellow card) 67'; Benamar (yellow card) 70'	Report	Saito 5'; Eerdhuijzen (yellow card) 57'; Sambo (yellow card) 89'	Stadium: Kras Stadion; Attendance: 6,807; Referee: Jannick van der Laan

21 May 2023 33	Sparta Rotterdam	4–1	SC Cambuur	Rotterdam
14:30 CEST (UTC+2)	Saito 30'; Pinto 38', (yellow card) 62'; Kitolano 42'; Namli 50'	Report	Uldriķis 8'; Tol 9'; Bergsma (yellow card) 36'	Stadium: Sparta Stadion Het Kasteel; Attendance: 9,731; Referee: Richard Martens

28 May 2023 34	FC Groningen	0–5	Sparta Rotterdam	Groningen
14:30 CEST (UTC+2)	Musampa (red card) 24'; Määttä (yellow card) 26'	Report	Vriends (yellow card) 15'; de Guzmán 25'; Saito 58'; Verschueren 75'; Lauritsen 79'; van Crooij 89' (pen.)	Stadium: Euroborg; Attendance: TBA; Referee: Rob Dieperink

=== KNVB Cup ===
21 October 2022 First round	OFC Oostzaan	1–3	Sparta Rotterdam	Rotterdam
20:00 CEST (UTC+2)	Butter 19' (pen.); Frimpong (yellow card) 38'; Bäly (yellow card) 64'; Walberg (yellow card) 75'	Report	Lokilo 3'; Sambo (yellow card) 19'; Lauritsen 82', 85'	Stadium: Sparta Stadion Het Kasteel; Referee: Robin Gansner

10 January 2023 Second round	Sparta Rotterdam	1–2	PSV	Rotterdam
21:00 CET (UTC+1)	Verschueren 61'; Sambo (yellow card) 81'	Report	Simons 34'; Madueke 45+1'; Teze (yellow card) 80'	Stadium: Sparta Stadion Het Kasteel; Attendance: 9,712; Referee: Serdar Gözübüyük

== Statistics ==
=== Clean sheets ===
Rank	No	Pos	Nat	Name	Eredivisie	KNVB Cup	ECL play-offs	Total
1	1	GK	(Netherlands)	Nick Olij	14	0	0	14
Total					14	0	0	14

Last updated: 28 May 2023
Source: Competitive matches
