= 2024–25 US Salernitana 1919 season =

US Salernitana 1919
2024–25 season
- Manager: Giovanni Martusciello (until 11 November); Stefano Colantuono (11 November–30 December); Roberto Breda (3 January–7 April); Pasquale Marino (from 7 April)
- Stadium: Stadio Arechi
- Serie B: 16th
- Relegation play-out: First leg
- Coppa Italia: Second round
- Top goalscorer: League: Simy (5); All: Simy (6)
| Home colours | Away colours | Third colours |

In the 2024–25 season, Unione Sportiva Salernitana 1919, having just been relegated from Serie A, competed in Serie B and the Coppa Italia. The club concluded the league campaign in 16th place after a difficult and inconsistent season, marked by the appointment of four different head coaches.

On 11 November 2024, head coach Giovanni Martusciello was relieved of his duties, just months after signing a two-year contract in July. The decision came in response to the team's poor performance, having dropped to 17th place in the league table with only two points earned from five games.

== Transfers ==
=== In ===
| Pos. | Player | Transferred from | Fee | Date | Source |
|---|---|---|---|---|---|
| FW | (Sierra Leone) Yayah Kallon | (Italy) Hellas Verona | Loan | 30 July 2024 | |
| MF | (Italy) Lorenzo Amatucci | (Italy) Fiorentina | Loan | 30 July 2024 | |
| DF | (Netherlands) Tijs Velthuis | (Netherlands) Sparta Rotterdam | Loan | 6 August 2024 | |
| DF | (Italy) Fabio Andrea Ruggeri | (Italy) Lazio | Loan | 17 August 2024 | |
| MF | (Colombia) Andrés Tello | (Italy) Catania | Loan | 17 August 2024 | |
| MF | (Italy) Roberto Soriano | | Undisclosed | 20 August 2024 | |
| MF | (France) Jeff Reine-Adélaïde | Unattached | | 20 August 2024 | |
| FW | (Poland) Szymon Włodarczyk | (Austria) Sturm Graz | Free | 27 August 2024 | |
| DF | (Poland) Paweł Jaroszyński | (Poland) Cracovia | Free | 30 August 2024 | |
| FW | (Venezuela) Ernesto Torregrossa | (Italy) Pisa | Free | 30 August 2024 | |
| MF | (Slovenia) Petar Stojanović | (Italy) Empoli | Loan | 30 August 2024 | |
| DF | (Italy) Gian Marco Ferrari | (Italy) Sassuolo | Free | 30 August 2024 | |
| MF | (Australia) Ajdin Hrustic | (Italy) Hellas Verona | Undisclosed | 30 August 2024 | |
| FW | (Italy) Alberto Cerri | (Italy) Como | Loan | 7 January 2025 | |
| MF | (Italy) Antonio Pio Iervolino | (Italy) Taranto | Loan return | 8 January 2025 | |
| FW | (Italy) Antonio Raimondo | (Italy) Bologna | Loan | 9 January 2025 | |
| DF | (Italy) Tommaso Corazza | (Italy) Bologna | Loan | 9 January 2025 | |
| MF | (Italy) Stefano Girelli | (Italy) Sampdoria | Loan | 9 January 2025 | |
| DF | (Georgia (country)) Luka Lochoshvili | (Italy) Cremonese | Loan | 10 January 2025 | |
| DF | (Argentina) Juan Guasone | (Argentina) Estudiantes de La Plata | Loan | 14 January 2025 | |
| MF | (Italy) Fabrizio Caligara | (Italy) Sassuolo | Loan | 16 January 2025 | |
| GK | (Denmark) Oliver Christensen | (Italy) Fiorentina | Loan | 22 January 2025 | |
| MF | (Italy) Federico Zuccon | (Italy) Juve Stabia | Loan | 3 February 2025 | |

=== Out ===
| Pos. | Player | Transferred to | Fee | Date | Source |
|---|---|---|---|---|---|
| DF | (Italy) Matteo Lovato | (Italy) Sassuolo | Loan | 7 August 2024 | |
| MF | (Mali) Lassana Coulibaly | (Italy) Lecce | €1,800,000 | 14 August 2024 | |
| FW | (Senegal) Boulaye Dia | (Italy) Lazio | Loan | 16 August 2024 | |
| MF | (Spain) Kaleb Jiménez | (Italy) Catania | Free | 28 August 2024 | |
| DF | (Austria) Flavius Daniliuc | (Italy) Hellas Verona | Loan | 30 August 2024 | |
| MF | (France) Junior Sambia | (Italy) Empoli | Loan | 30 August 2024 | |
| MF | (Italy) Antonio Pio Iervolino | (Italy) Taranto | Loan | 30 August 2024 | |
| MF | (Senegal) Mamadou Coulibaly | (Italy) Catanzaro | Undisclosed | 30 August 2024 | |
| MF | (Croatia) Domagoj Bradarić | (Italy) Hellas Verona | Loan | 30 August 2024 | |
| GK | (Mexico) Guillermo Ochoa | (Portugal) AVS | Free | 2 September 2024 | |
| DF | (Poland) Mateusz Łęgowski | (Switzerland) Yverdon Sport | Loan | 9 September 2024 | |
| DF | (Greece) Kostas Manolas | (Greece) Pannaxiakos | Free | 16 October 2024 | |
| GK | (Italy) Gregorio Salvati | (Italy) Roma City | Free | 19 November 2024 | |
| FW | (Romania) Andres Şfaiţ | (Romania) CFR Cluj | Undisclosed | 8 January 2025 | |
| DF | (Netherlands) Tijs Velthuis | (Netherlands) Sparta Rotterdam | Loan return | 22 January 2025 | |
| MF | (Italy) Nicola Dalmonte | (Italy) Catania | Loan | 28 January 2025 | |
| MF | (Italy) Antonio Pio Iervolino | (Malta) Żabbar St. Patrick | Loan | 31 January 2025 | |
| GK | (Italy) Vincenzo Fiorillo | (Italy) Carrarese | Loan | 31 January 2025 | |
| FW | (Sierra Leone) Yayah Kallon | (Italy) Hellas Verona | Loan return | 2 February 2025 | |
| FW | (Venezuela) Ernesto Torregrossa | (Italy) Carrarese | Undisclosed | 3 February 2025 | |
| MF | (Italy) Giulio Maggiore | (Italy) Bari | Loan | 3 February 2025 | |
| MF | (Chile) Diego Valencia | (Chile) Universidad Católica | Free | 12 February 2025 | |

== Competitions ==
=== Serie B ===
==== Lague table ====
| Pos | Team | Pld | W | D | L | GF | GA | GD | Pts | Promotion, qualification or relegation |
|---|---|---|---|---|---|---|---|---|---|---|
| 14 | Reggiana | 38 | 11 | 11 | 16 | 42 | 52 | −10 | 44 | |
| 15 | Frosinone | 38 | 9 | 16 | 13 | 37 | 50 | −13 | 43 | |
| 16 | Salernitana (R) | 38 | 11 | 9 | 18 | 37 | 47 | −10 | 42 | Qualification for relegation play-out |
| 17 | Sampdoria (O) | 38 | 8 | 17 | 13 | 38 | 49 | −11 | 41 | Qualification for relegation play-out |
| 18 | Brescia (R, E) | 38 | 9 | 16 | 13 | 41 | 48 | −7 | 39 (Note: Brescia were deducted 4 points due to administrative irregularities.) | Excluded and folded |

Source: Serie BKT
Rules for classification: 1) Points; 2) Head-to-head points; 3) Head-to-head goal difference; 4) Goal difference; 5) Goals scored; 6) Draw.
(Note: Head-to-head record is used only after all the matches between the teams in question have been played)
(E) Eliminated; (O) Play-off winners; (R) Relegated

==== Results by round ====
| Round | 1 | 2 | 3 | 4 | 5 | 6 | 7 | 8 | 9 | 10 | 11 | 12 | 13 | 14 | 15 | 16 | 17 | 18 | 19 | 20 | 21 | 22 | 23 | 24 | 25 | 26 | 27 | 28 | 29 | 30 | 31 | 32 | 33 | 34 | 35 | 36 | 37 | 38 |
|---|---|---|---|---|---|---|---|---|---|---|---|---|---|---|---|---|---|---|---|---|---|---|---|---|---|---|---|---|---|---|---|---|---|---|---|---|---|---|
| Ground | H | A | H | A | H | A | H | A | H | A | H | A | H | A | H | A | H | H | A | A | H | H | A | H | A | A | H | A | H | A | H | A | H | A | H | A | H | A |
| Result | W | L | W | L | L | D | D | W | L | L | D | D | L | L | W | D | L | D | L | L | L | W | L | W | D | L | D | L | W | D | L | L | W | W | W | L | W | L |
| Position | 2 | 8 | 5 | 8 | 14 | 14 | 15 | 10 | 14 | 16 | 16 | 14 | 17 | 18 | 15 | 16 | 16 | 16 | 18 | 18 | 20 | 17 | 18 | 18 | 17 | 18 | 18 | 19 | 19 | 19 | 19 | 19 | 18 | 17 | 14 | 16 | 15 | 17 |

A = Away; H = Home; W = Win; D = Draw; L = Loss

==== Matches ====
| 17 August 2024 1 | Salernitana | 2–1 | Cittadella |

| 24 August 2024 2 | Südtirol | 3–2 | Salernitana |

| 27 August 2024 3 | Salernitana | 3–2 | Sampdoria |

| 1 September 2024 4 | Mantova | 1–0 | Salernitana |

| 15 September 2024 5 | Salernitana | 2–3 | Pisa |

| 21 September 2024 6 | Reggiana | 0–0 | Salernitana |

| 29 September 2024 7 | Salernitana | 0–0 | Catanzaro |

| 6 October 2024 8 | Palermo | 0–1 | Salernitana |

| 19 October 2024 9 | Salernitana | 0–2 | Spezia |

| 26 October 2024 10 | Cremonese | 2–1 | Salernitana |

| 29 October 2024 11 | Salernitana | 1–1 | Cesena |

| 3 November 2024 12 | Cosenza | 1–1 | Salernitana |

| 10 November 2024 13 | Salernitana | 0–2 | Bari |

| 23 November 2024 14 | Sassuolo | 4–0 | Salernitana |

| 1 December 2024 15 | Salernitana | 4–1 | Carrarese |

| 7 December 2024 16 | Modena | 1–1 | Salernitana |

| 15 December 2024 17 | Salernitana | 1–2 | Juve Stabia |

| 20 December 2024 18 | Salernitana | 0–0 | Brescia |

| 26 December 2024 19 | Frosinone | 2–0 | Salernitana |

| 29 December 2024 20 | Catanzaro | 1–0 | Salernitana |

| 12 January 2025 21 | Salernitana | 1–2 | Sassuolo |

| 18 January 2025 22 | Salernitana | 2–1 | Reggiana |

| 26 January 2025 23 | Pisa | 1–0 | Salernitana |

| 2 February 2025 24 | Salernitana | 1–0 | Cremonese |

| 7 February 2025 25 | Brescia | 0–0 | Salernitana |

| 15 February 2025 26 | Carrarese | 3–2 | Salernitana |

| 23 February 2025 27 | Salernitana | 1–1 | Frosinone |

| 1 March 2025 28 | Cesena | 2–0 | Salernitana |

| 8 March 2025 29 | Salernitana | 1–0 | Modena |

| 15 March 2025 30 | Bari | 0–0 | Salernitana |

| 30 March 2025 31 | Salernitana | 1–2 | Palermo |

| 5 April 2025 32 | Juve Stabia | 1–0 | Salernitana |

| 12 April 2025 33 | Salernitana | 2–1 | Südtirol |

| 25 April 2025 35 | Salernitana | 3–1 | Cosenza |

| 1 May 2025 36 | Spezia | 2–0 | Salernitana |

| 4 May 2025 37 | Salernitana | 2–0 | Mantova |

| 9 May 2025 38 | Sampdoria | 1–0 | Salernitana |

| 13 May 2025 34 | Cittadella | 0–2 | Salernitana |

==== Relegation play-out ====
| June 2025 First leg | Sampdoria | v | Salernitana | Genoa |

| June 2025 Second leg | Salernitana | v | Sampdoria | Salerno |
| | | | | Stadium: Stadio Arechi |

=== Coppa Italia ===
| 12 August 2024 First round | Salernitana | 3–3 (5–4 p) | Spezia | Salerno |
| 20:45 | | Report | | Stadium: Stadio Arechi; Referee: Daniele Rutella |

| 25 September 2024 Second round | Udinese | 3–1 | Salernitana | Udine |
| 18:30 | Bijol 20', (yellow card) 90'; Lucca 44' (pen.); Ekkelenkamp 47'; Davis (yellow card) 77' | Report | Simy 25'; Velthuis (yellow card) 43'; Ruggeri (yellow card) 53'; Tello (yellow card) 79'; Torregrossa (penalty missed) 84'; Maggiore (red card) 90+8' | Stadium: Stadio Friuli; Referee: Francesco Cosso |
