= Shurandy Sambo =

Curaçaoan footballer (born 2001)

Personal information
- Full name: Shurandy Ruggerio Sambo
- Date of birth: 19 August 2001 (age 25)
- Place of birth: Geldrop, Netherlands
- Height: 1.74 m (5 ft 9 in)
- Position: Right back

Team information
- Current team: Burnley
- Number: 20

Youth career
- –2009: SV Braakhuizen
- 2009–2020: PSV

Senior career*
Years	Team	Apps	(Gls)
2020–2024	Jong PSV	46	(6)
2020–2024	PSV	12	(0)
2022–2023	→ Sparta Rotterdam (loan)	30	(2)
2024–	Burnley	1	(0)
2025–2026	→ Sparta Rotterdam (loan)	25	(0)

International career^{‡}
2016–2017	Netherlands U16	6	(0)
2017–2018	Netherlands U17	11	(0)
2023	Netherlands U21	2	(0)
2025–	Curaçao	15	(0)
Medal record
Representing Netherlands
UEFA European Under-17 Championship
Winner	England 2018	U-17 Team
- * Club domestic league appearances and goals as of 11:10, 13 May 2026 (UTC) ‡ National team caps and goals as of 13:24, 18 November 2026 (UTC)

Shurandy Ruggerio Sambo (born 19 August 2001) is a professional footballer who plays as a right back for EFL Championship club Burnley. Born in the Netherlands, he represents the Curaçao national team.

== Club career ==
=== PSV ===
Sambo played youth football for SV Braakhuizen and PSV Eindhoven. In the winter break of the 2019–20 season, he was promoted to the reserve team, Jong PSV, competing in the second-tier Eerste Divisie. He made his debut on 13 January 2020 in a 0–0 league draw at home against Jong Ajax.

In the 2020–21 season, Sambo made 35 appearances for Jong PSV, scoring six goals. He made his debut for the first team in the final matchday of the Eredivisie on 16 May 2021, coming off the bench for Armando Obispo in the 77th minute against Utrecht.

On 15 August 2021, Sambo tore his anterior cruciate ligament during practice, sidelining him for the entire 2021–22 season. At the end of the season, on 28 April 2022, he extended his contract with PSV until 2024.

==== Sparta Rotterdam (loan) ====
Sambo joined Eredivisie club Sparta Rotterdam on loan for the 2022–23 season, with an option to buy.

=== Burnley ===
On 28 June 2024, Sambo signed for Burnley on a four-year deal.

== International career ==
Born in the Netherlands, Sambo is of Curaçaoan descent. He is a youth international for the Netherlands. He was called up to the preliminary squad for the Curaçao national team for the 2021 CONCACAF Gold Cup.

On 29 August 2025, Sambo's request to change sports citizenship from Dutch to Curaçaoan was approved by FIFA. He made his debut for Curaçao on 6 September 2025 in a 0–0 draw against Trinidad and Tobago.

== Career statistics ==
=== Club ===
As of match played 10 May 2026

Appearances and goals by club, season and competition
Club	Season	League			National Cup (Note: Includes KNVB Cup)		League Cup (Note: Includes EFL Cup)		Europe		Other		Total	
Club	Season	Division	Apps	Goals	Apps	Goals	Apps	Goals	Apps	Goals	Apps	Goals	Apps	Goals
Jong PSV	2019–20	Eerste Divisie	8	0	—		—		—		—		8	0
Jong PSV	2020–21	Eerste Divisie	35	6	—		—		—		—		35	6
Jong PSV	2021–22	Eerste Divisie	1	0	—		—		—		—		1	0
Jong PSV	2023–24	Eerste Divisie	2	0	—		—		—		—		2	0
Jong PSV	Total		46	6	—		—		—		—		46	6
PSV	2020–21	Eredivisie	1	0	0	0	—		0	0	—		1	0
PSV	2023–24	Eredivisie	11	0	0	0	—		3 (Note: Appearances in UEFA Champions League)	0	0	0	14	0
PSV	Total		12	0	0	0	—		3	0	0	0	15	0
Sparta Rotterdam (loan)	2022–23	Eredivisie	30	2	2	0	—		—		4 (Note: Appearances in the Eredivisie UEFA Europa Conference League play-offs)	0	36	2
Burnley	2024–25	Championship	1	0	0	0	1	0	—		—		2	0
Burnley	2026–27	Championship	0	0	0	0	0	0	—		—		0	0
Burnley	Total		1	0	0	0	1	0	—		—		2	0
Sparta Rotterdam (loan)	2025–26	Eredivisie	25	0	2	0	—		—		—		27	0
Career total			114	8	4	0	1	0	3	0	4	0	126	8

=== International ===
As of match played 15 November 2026

Appearances and goals by national team and year
National team	Year	Apps	Goals
Curaçao	2025	6	0
Curaçao	2026	9	0
Total		15	0

== Honours ==
PSV

- Eredivisie: 2023–24
- Johan Cruyff Shield: 2023

Netherlands U17

- UEFA European Under-17 Championship: 2018
