= Pelle Clement =

Dutch footballer (born 1996)

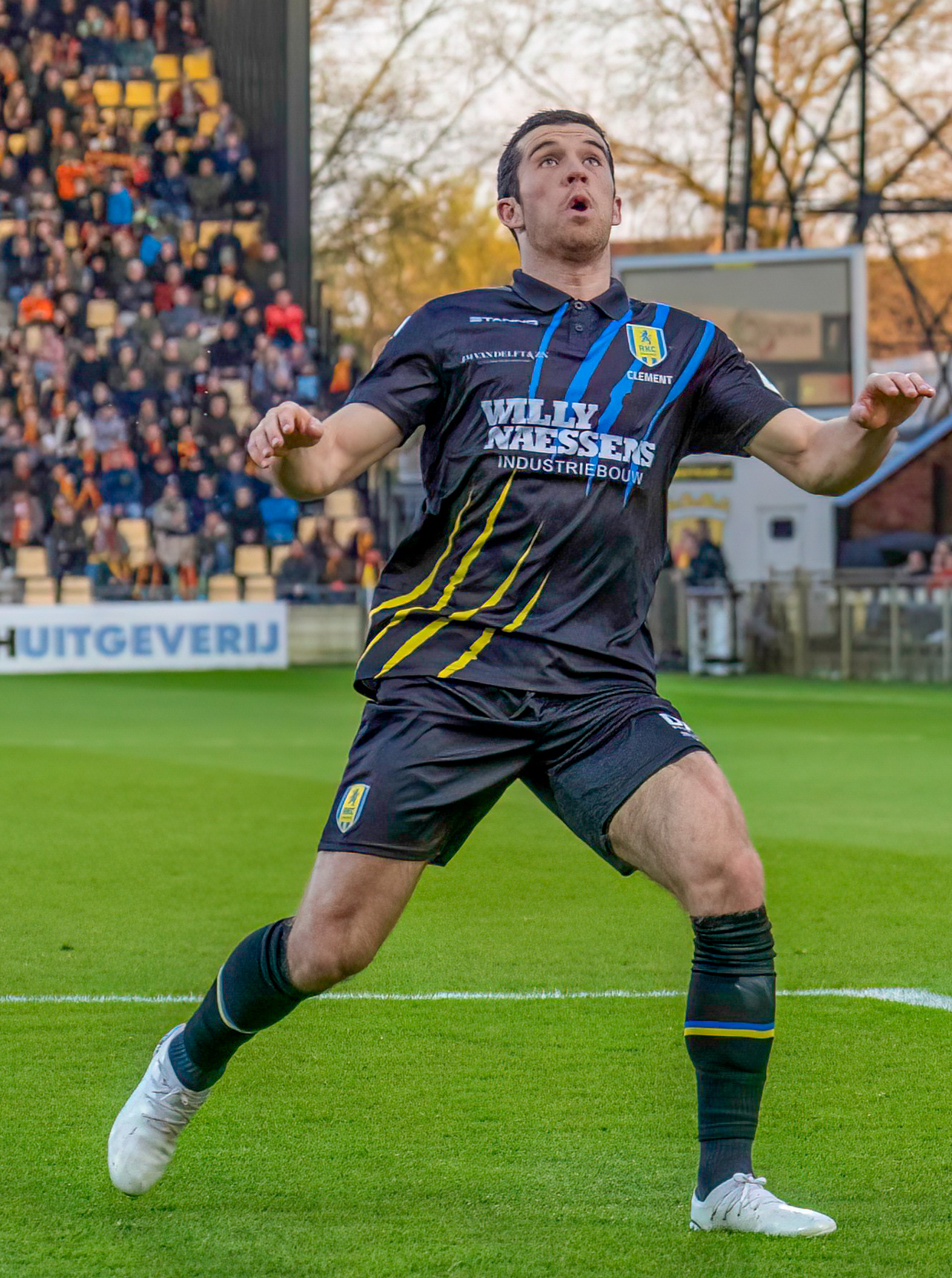
- Clement with RKC Waalwijk in 2023

Personal information
- Date of birth: 19 May 1996 (age 30)
- Place of birth: Amsterdam, Netherlands
- Height: 1.77 m (5 ft 10 in)
- Position: Attacking midfielder

Team information
- Current team: Groningen
- Number: 24

Youth career
- –2006: Koninklijke HFC
- 2006–2015: Ajax

Senior career*
Years	Team	Apps	(Gls)
2015–2017	Jong Ajax	54	(6)
2016–2017	Ajax	1	(0)
2017–2019	Reading	23	(0)
2019–2022	PEC Zwolle	83	(4)
2022–2023	RKC Waalwijk	33	(2)
2023–2026	Sparta Rotterdam	87	(6)
2026–	Groningen	0	(0)

International career
2013	Netherlands U18	3	(0)
2015–2016	Netherlands U20	7	(1)
2018	Netherlands U21	2	(0)
- * Club domestic league appearances and goals as of 17 May 2026

Pelle Clement (born 19 May 1996) is a Dutch professional footballer who plays as an attacking midfielder for Eredivisie club Groningen.

== Club career ==
Clement is a youth exponent from Ajax, whom he joined in 2006 from his youth club Koninklijke HFC. He made his professional debut at Jong Ajax on 8 May 2015 in an Eerste Divisie game against VVV Venlo. He played the full game. His first Eredivisie match was a November 2016 match against NEC.

On 28 June 2017, Clement moved to Reading from Ajax for an undisclosed fee, signing a three-year contract with the EFL Championship club.

On 3 January 2019, Jaap Stam signed Clement for the second time for PEC Zwolle after only featuring for Reading once in the 2018–19 season. In his first game he started and registered an assist as Zwolle beat Feyenoord 3–1.

Clement joined RKC Waalwijk on 5 August 2022, signing a one-year contract.

On 6 May 2023, it was announced that he would be joining Sparta Rotterdam on a two-year deal on 1 July 2023 following the conclusion of his contract with Waalwijk.

On 27 June 2026, Clement signed for Groningen on a free transfer after his contract with Sparta Rotterdam expired. He agreed to a two-year contract, keeping him at the club until the summer of 2028.

== Career statistics ==
As of match played 17 May 2026

Appearances and goals by club, season and competition
Club	Season	League			National Cup		League Cup		Continental		Other		Total	
Club	Season	Division	Apps	Goals	Apps	Goals	Apps	Goals	Apps	Goals	Apps	Goals	Apps	Goals
Ajax	2014–15	Eredivisie	0	0	0	0	—		0	0	0	0	0	0
Ajax	2015–16	Eredivisie	0	0	0	0	—		0	0	0	0	0	0
Ajax	2016–17	Eredivisie	1	0	2	3	—		1 (Note: Appearance in the Europa League)	0	0	0	0	0
Ajax	Total		1	0	2	3	—		1	0	0	0	4	3
Jong Ajax	2014–15	Eerste Divisie	1	0	—		—		—		—		2	0
Jong Ajax	2015–16	Eerste Divisie	30	1	—		—		—		—		30	1
Jong Ajax	2016–17	Eerste Divisie	23	5	—		—		—		—		23	5
Jong Ajax	Total		54	6	—		—		1	0	—		55	6
Reading	2017–18	Championship	23	0	2	0	3	0	—		—		28	0
Reading	2018–19	Championship	0	0	0	0	1	0	—		—		1	0
Reading	Total		23	0	2	0	4	0	—		—		29	0
Reading U-23s	2017–18	—			—		—		—		1 (Note: Appearance in the EFL Trophy)	0	1	0
PEC Zwolle	2018–19	Eredivisie	17	0	0	0	—		—		—		17	0
PEC Zwolle	2019–20	Eredivisie	24	2	2	0	—		—		—		26	2
PEC Zwolle	2020–21	Eredivisie	23	2	1	0	—		—		—		24	2
PEC Zwolle	2021–22	Eredivisie	19	0	1	0	—		—		—		20	0
PEC Zwolle	Total		83	4	4	0	—		—		—		87	4
RKC Waalwijk	2022–23	Eredivisie	33	2	1	0	—		—		—		34	2
Sparta Rotterdam	2023–24	Eredivisie	29	2	1	0	—		—		1 (Note: Appearances in Eredivisie European play-offs)	0	31	2
Sparta Rotterdam	2024–25	Eredivisie	32	2	1	0	—		—		0	0	33	2
Sparta Rotterdam	2025–26	Eredivisie	26	2	2	0	—		—		—		28	2
Sparta Rotterdam	Total		87	6	4	0	—		—		1	0	92	6
Career total			281	18	13	3	4	0	1	0	2	0	301	21
