= Tijs Velthuis =

Dutch footballer (born 2002)

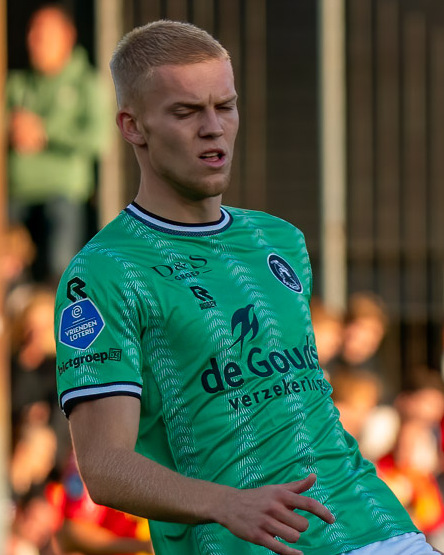
- Velthuis with Sparta Rotterdam in 2023

Personal information
- Date of birth: 12 January 2002 (age 24)
- Place of birth: Oldenzaal, the Netherlands
- Height: 1.90 m (6 ft 3 in)
- Position: Centre-back

Team information
- Current team: PEC Zwolle

Youth career
- –2012: Quick '20
- 2012–2019: Twente
- 2019–2020: AZ Alkmaar

Senior career*
Years	Team	Apps	(Gls)
2020–2023	Jong AZ	61	(1)
2022–2023	→ NAC Breda (loan)	28	(1)
2023–2026	Sparta Rotterdam	28	(0)
2024–2025	→ Salernitana (loan)	8	(0)
2025	→ Sassuolo (loan)	0	(0)
2026	→ PEC Zwolle (loan)	11	(0)
2026–	PEC Zwolle	0	(0)

International career^{‡}
2018–2019	Netherlands U17	4	(0)
2019	Netherlands U18	1	(0)
- * Club domestic league appearances and goals as of 21 May 2026 ‡ National team caps and goals as of 11:44, 30 October 2020 (UTC)

Tijs Velthuis (born 12 January 2002) is a Dutch professional footballer who plays as a centre-back for Eredivisie club PEC Zwolle.

== Career ==
Velthuis joined NAC Breda on a season-long loan deal on 13 July 2022, with an option to buy.

On 3 July 2023, Velthuis signed a contract with Sparta Rotterdam for the term of three years, with an additional option year.

On 7 August 2024, Velthuis moved to Salernitana in Italy on loan with an option to buy and a conditional obligation to buy.

On 23 January 2025, Velthuis moved on a new Serie B loan to Sassuolo, with an option to buy.

On 3 February 2026, Velthuis was loaned once again, to PEC Zwolle, with an option to buy. On 14 May 2026, PEC Zwolle exercised the purchase option and signed Velthuis for three seasons.

== Career statistics ==
=== Club ===
As of match played 17 May 2026

Appearances and goals by club, season and competition
Club	Season	League			Cup		Continental		Other		Total	
Club	Season	Division	Apps	Goals	Apps	Goals	Apps	Goals	Apps	Goals	Apps	Goals
Jong AZ	2020–21	Eerste Divisie	28	1	–		–		–		28	1
Jong AZ	2021–22	Eerste Divisie	33	0	–		–		–		33	0
Jong AZ	Total		61	1	–		–		–		61	1
NAC Breda (loan)	2022–23	Eerste Divisie	28	1	2	0	–		1 (Note: Appearance in Eerste Divisie playoffs)	0	31	1
Sparta Rotterdam	2023–24	Eredivisie	25	0	2	0	–		–		27	0
Sparta Rotterdam	2025–26	Eredivisie	3	0	0	0	–		–		3	0
Sparta Rotterdam	Total		28	0	2	0	–		–		30	0
Salernitana (loan)	2024–25	Serie B	8	0	2	0	–		–		10	0
PEC Zwolle (loan)	2025–26	Eredivisie	11	0	–		–		–		11	0
PEC Zwolle	2026–27	Eredivisie	0	0	0	0	–		–		0	0
Career total			136	2	6	0	0	0	1	0	143	2

== Honours ==
Sassuolo

- Serie B: 2024–25
