= Arno Verschueren =

Belgian footballer (born 1997)

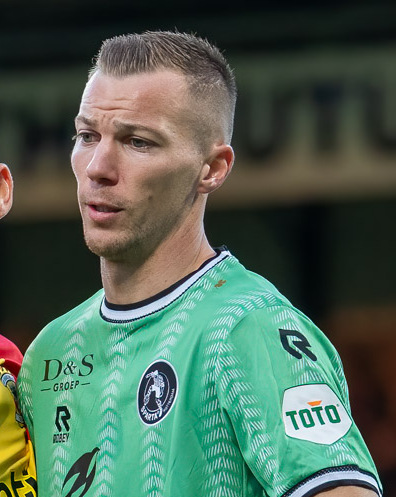
- Verschueren in 2023 with Sparta Rotterdam

Personal information
- Date of birth: 8 April 1997 (age 29)
- Place of birth: Lier, Belgium
- Height: 1.86 m (6 ft 1 in)
- Position: Defensive midfielder

Team information
- Current team: Beveren
- Number: 24

Youth career
- 2002–2019: Lierse
- 2009–2012: Westerlo
- 2012–2014: OH Leuven

Senior career*
Years	Team	Apps	(Gls)
2014–2016	Westerlo	19	(0)
2016–2020	NAC Breda	106	(13)
2020–2022	Lommel	36	(6)
2022	→ Sparta Rotterdam (loan)	12	(2)
2022–2025	Sparta Rotterdam	78	(19)
2025–2026	Twente	44	(0)
2026–	Beveren	3	(0)

International career^{‡}
2012	Belgium U15	3	(0)
2012–2013	Belgium U16	9	(0)
2013–2014	Belgium U17	13	(0)
2014–2015	Belgium U18	5	(0)
2015–2016	Belgium U19	9	(0)
- * Club domestic league appearances and goals as of 20 September 2026 ‡ National team caps and goals as of 09:46, 2 April 2016 (UTC)

Arno Verschueren (born 8 April 1997) is a Belgian professional footballer who plays as a defensive midfielder for Belgian Pro League club Beveren.

== Club career ==
Verschueren made his top flight debut on 9 August 2014 against Waasland-Beveren in a 1–1 draw. He replaced Jarno Molenberghs after 80 minutes.

On 19 January 2022, Verschueren agreed to join Sparta Rotterdam in the Netherlands. The transfer was a loan for the remainder of the 2021–22 season, and then the transfer became permanent, as Verschueren signed a contract with Sparta until the summer of 2025.

On 28 January 2025, Verschueren moved to Twente on a three-and-a-half-year contract.

On 1 September 2026, Verschueren signed a three-year deal with Beveren.

== Career statistics ==
As of match played 17 May 2026

Appearances and goals by club, season and competition
Club	Season	League			National Cup		Europe		Other		Total	
Club	Season	Division	Apps	Goals	Apps	Goals	Apps	Goals	Apps	Goals	Apps	Goals
Westerlo	2014–15	Belgian First Division A	5	0	—		—		—		5	0
Westerlo	2015–16	Belgian First Division A	4	0	2	0	—		—		6	0
Westerlo	2016–17	Belgian First Division A	0	0	0	0	—		—		0	0
Westerlo	Total		9	0	2	0	—		—		11	0
NAC Breda	2016–17	Eerste Divisie	34	4	1	0	—		4 (Note: Appearances in Eerste Divisie play-offs)	0	39	4
NAC Breda	2017–18	Eredivisie	26	1	1	0	—		—		27	1
NAC Breda	2018–19	Eredivisie	18	1	0	0	—		3	1	21	1
NAC Breda	2019–20	Eerste Divisie	28	7	4	0	—		—		32	7
NAC Breda	Total		106	13	6	0	—		7	1	119	13
Lommel	2020–21	Belgian First Division B	21	3	2	0	—		—		23	3
Lommel	2021–22	Belgian First Division B	15	3	3	0	—		—		18	3
Lommel	Total		36	6	5	0	—		—		41	6
Sparta Rotterdam (loan)	2021–22	Eredivisie	12	2	0	0	—		—		12	2
Sparta Rotterdam	2022–23	Eredivisie	31	9	2	1	—		—		33	10
Sparta Rotterdam	2023–24	Eredivisie	27	9	1	0	—		0	0	28	9
Sparta Rotterdam	2024–25	Eredivisie	20	1	2	1	—		0	0	22	2
Sparta Rotterdam	Total		78	19	5	2	—		0	0	83	22
Twente	2024–25	Eredivisie	16	0	—		2 (Note: Appearances in UEFA Europa League)	0	—		18	0
Twente	2025–26	Eredivisie	30	0	4	1	—		—		34	1
Twente	Total		46	0	4	1	2	0	—		52	1
Career total			278	40	20	3	2	0	7	1	307	43

== Honours ==
Individual

- Eredivisie Team of the Month: October 2022
