= Charles-Andreas Brym =

Soccer player (born 1998)

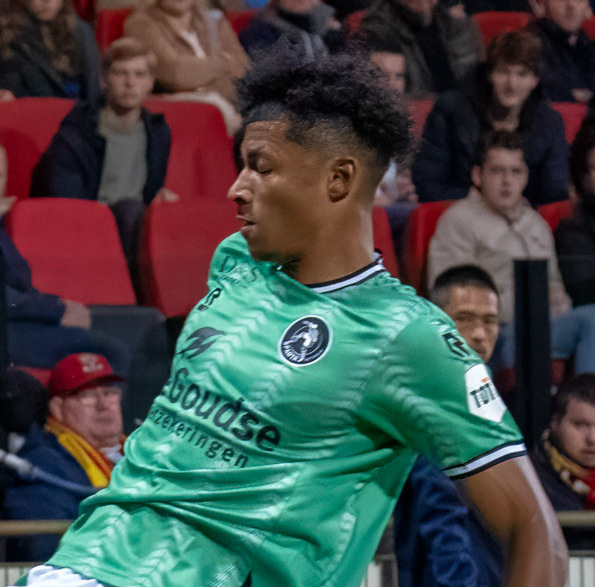
- Brym playing for Sparta Rotterdam in 2023

Personal information
- Date of birth: August 8, 1998 (age 28)
- Place of birth: Colombes, France
- Height: 1.85 m (6 ft 1 in)
- Positions: Right winger; forward

Team information
- Current team: NAC Breda
- Number: 28

Youth career
- 2011–2013: Montreal Impact
- 2013–2014: Gazélec Ajaccio
- 2014–2015: Mouscron
- 2015–2018: Zulte Waregem

Senior career*
Years	Team	Apps	(Gls)
2018–2021	Lille II	30	(12)
2019–2020	→ Belenenses SAD (loan)	1	(0)
2020–2021	→ Mouscron (loan)	7	(0)
2021–2022	FC Eindhoven	26	(8)
2022–2024	Sparta Rotterdam	45	(4)
2022–2023	→ FC Eindhoven (loan)	29	(11)
2025	Almere City	17	(3)
2025–	NAC Breda	36	(11)

International career^{‡}
2021	Canada U23	4	(0)
2020–	Canada	14	(1)
- * Club domestic league appearances and goals as of November 6, 2026 ‡ National team caps and goals as of November 13, 2026

Charles-Andréas Brym (born August 8, 1998) is a professional soccer player who plays as a right winger or forward for Eerste Divisie club NAC Breda. Born in France, he plays for the Canada national team.

== Early life ==
Born in France to a Togolese father and a Corsican mother, Brym moved to Montreal in Canada with his family and spent his early years there. He holds French and Canadian nationalities. In 2011, he joined the youth academy of Montreal Impact as one of their first academy recruits. He returned to France to further his soccer career in 2013 with Gazélec Ajaccio. After one season there, he moved to Belgium.

== Club career ==
=== Lille ===
On July 4, 2018, Brym signed a professional contract with Ligue 1 club Lille.

In July 2019, Brym was loaned to Belenenses SAD of the Primeira Liga. He made his debut for Belenenses on August 30 against Boavista. In July 2020, Brym joined his former club Mouscron in Belgium on loan.

=== FC Eindhoven ===
In August 2021, Brym signed for Eerste Divisie club FC Eindhoven, on a one-year contract with an option for a second season. He made his debut for the club on September 5 in a 4–2 loss to ADO Den Haag, coming 59th-minute substitute for Jort van der Sande. On September 13, he scored his first goal in a 3–2 win over Helmond Sport after an assist by Joey Sleegers.

=== Sparta Rotterdam ===
On May 31, 2022, Brym signed with Eredivisie club Sparta Rotterdam. He made his debut on August 14 against AZ as a late substitute in a 3–2 defeat. On August 29, Sparta Rotterdam announced Brym had been loaned to his former club FC Eindhoven in the Eerste Divisie for the remainder of the season.

Returning to the club for the 2023–24 Eredivisie campaign, Brym scored his first goals for Sparta against Feyenoord, netting a brace in an eventual 2–2 draw on August 20, 2023.

=== Almere City ===
In January 2025, Brym moved to fellow Eredivisie club Almere City, signing a deal through the end of the 2026–27 season, as well as reuniting with his former manager at Sparta Rotterdam. He made his debut for the club on January 12 in a 0–0 draw against Groningen. On February 22, he scored his first goal for Almere in a 2–1 loss to Feyenoord.

=== NAC Breda ===
In July 2025, Brym would transfer to Eredivisie club NAC Breda, signing a 3 year contract with a club option for a 4th season.

== International career ==
=== Youth ===
Brym was named to the Canadian under-23 provisional roster for the 2020 CONCACAF Men's Olympic Qualifying Championship on February 26, 2020. He was named to the final squad on March 10, 2021.

=== Senior ===
In January 2020, Brym was called up to the senior Canada national team ahead of friendlies against Barbados and Iceland. On January 7, he made his debut as a substitute against Barbados and scored his first goal three days later in a rematch against Barbados.

In June 2023, Brym was called-up to Canada's 2023 CONCACAF Gold Cup squad. On July 9, in their quarter-final match against the United States, he missed the crucial penalty which saw Canada lose the shoot-out and resulted in their elimination from the tournament.

== Career statistics ==
=== Club ===
As of match played November 6, 2026

Appearances and goals by club, season and competition
Club	Season	League			National cup		Continental		Other		Total	
Club	Season	Division	Apps	Goals	Apps	Goals	Apps	Goals	Apps	Goals	Apps	Goals
Lille II	2017–18	Championnat National 2	6	1	—		—		—		6	1
Lille II	2018–19	Championnat National 2	19	10	—		—		—		19	10
Lille II	2019–20	Championnat National 2	5	1	—		—		—		5	1
Lille II	Total		30	12	0	0	0	0	0	0	30	12
Belenenses SAD (loan)	2019–20	Primeira Liga	1	0	0	0	—		—		1	0
Mouscron (loan)	2020–21	Belgian Pro League	7	0	1	0	—		—		8	0
FC Eindhoven	2021–22	Eerste Divisie	26	8	1	0	—		4	1	31	9
Sparta Rotterdam	2022–23	Eredivisie	2	0	—		—		—		2	0
Sparta Rotterdam	2023–24	Eredivisie	31	4	1	1	—		1	0	33	5
Sparta Rotterdam	2024–25	Eredivisie	12	0	2	3	—		—		14	3
Sparta Rotterdam	Total		45	4	3	4	0	0	1	0	49	8
FC Eindhoven (loan)	2022–23	Eerste Divisie	29	11	2	1	—		2	0	33	12
Almere City	2024–25	Eredivisie	17	3	0	0	—		—		17	3
NAC Breda	2025–26	Eredivisie	24	2	1	0	—		—		25	2
NAC Breda	2026–27	Eerste Divisie	12	9	0	0	—		—		12	9
NAC Breda	Total		36	11	1	0	0	0	1	0	37	11
Career total			191	51	40	5	0	0	7	1	207	57

=== International ===
As of match played November 13, 2026

Appearances and goals by national team and year
National team	Year	Apps	Goals
Canada	2020	3	1
Canada	2021	3	0
Canada	2022	1	0
Canada	2023	5	0
Canada	2024	1	0
Canada	2025	0	0
Canada	2026	1	0
Total		14	1

As of January 10, 2020
Scores and results list Canada's goal tally first, score column indicates score after each Brym goal.

List of international goals scored by Charles-Andreas Brym
No.	Date	Venue	Cap	Opponent	Score	Result	Competition
1	January 10, 2020	Championship Soccer Stadium, Irvine, United States	2	Barbados	1–0	4–1	Friendly
