= Metinho =

Footballer (born 2003)

Personal information
- Full name: Abemly Meto Silu
- Date of birth: 23 April 2003 (age 23)
- Place of birth: Matadi, DR Congo
- Height: 1.78 m (5 ft 10 in)
- Position: Midfielder

Team information
- Current team: Basel
- Number: 5

Youth career
- 2014: Madureira
- 2015–2021: Fluminense

Senior career*
Years	Team	Apps	(Gls)
2021	Fluminense	1	(0)
2021–	Troyes B	8	(1)
2022–2023	→ Lommel (loan)	26	(4)
2023–2025	→ Sparta Rotterdam (loan)	36	(2)
2023	→ Jong Sparta Rotterdam (loan)	1	(0)
2025	→ Basel (loan)	12	(0)
2025–	Basel	37	(4)
- * Club domestic league appearances and goals as of 28 September 2026

Abemly Meto Silu (born 23 April 2003), known as Metinho, is a professional footballer who plays as a midfielder for Swiss Super League club Basel on loan from Ligue 1 club Troyes. Born in the Democratic Republic of the Congo, he holds both Congolese and Brazilian citizenship.

== Early life ==
Metinho was born in Matadi, Democratic Republic of the Congo, but moved to Brazil aged one, after his father, Abel, fled the country following religious persecution. After settling in the Cinco Bocas favela in Brás de Pina, a neighbourhood in Rio de Janeiro, Abel came up with the name "Metinho" for his son, taking the diminutive form of his real name, Meto - a common tradition in Brazil.

== Club career ==
Metinho progressed through the youth sides of Madureira before going on trial with Vasco da Gama. He was offered a contract, but changed his mind before finalising the deal, determined that he would wait for Fluminense to make an offer. He joined the Tricolor, and moved from the favela into a house owned by then-teammate João Pedro. Metinho would go on to captain the under-17 team of Fluminense and play for the club's under-20 side. In 2020, he was included in The Guardian's "Next Generation 2020". In March 2021, Metinho made his professional debut, coming on as a substitute for Rafael Ribeiro in a 3–0 loss to Portuguesa-RJ.

On 15 June 2021, Fluminense confirmed that Metinho had been released by the club in order to "introduce himself to his new club in Europe". On 23 July, this was confirmed to be Ligue 1 side Troyes, with which he signed a five-year contract for a reported fee of €5 million plus bonuses. On 2 July 2022, Metinho moved to Belgian club Lommel on loan for the 2022–23 season.

On 31 August 2023, Metinho joined Sparta Rotterdam in the Netherlands on loan. The loan was extended for the 2024–25 season.

On 27 January 2025, Metinho moved on a new loan to Basel in Switzerland.

== International career ==
Metinho became a naturalized Brazilian citizen in 2019. In November 2020, despite not having represented Brazil at any youth level, Metinho was called up to train with the senior squad, alongside teammate Luiz Henrique. He remains eligible to represent the country of his birth, the Democratic Republic of the Congo.

== Honours ==
Basel

- Swiss Super League: 2024–25

== Career statistics ==
As of match played 18 December 2024

Club	Season	League			Cup		Continental		Other		Total	
Club	Season	Division	Apps	Goals	Apps	Goals	Apps	Goals	Apps	Goals	Apps	Goals
Fluminense	2021	Série A	0	0	0	0	0	0	1 (Note: Appearance in Campeonato Carioca)	0	1	0
Troyes B	2021–22	Championnat National 3	8	1	—		—		—		8	1
Lommel (loan)	2022–23	Challenger Pro League	26	4	1	0	—		0	0	27	4
Jong Sparta Rotterdam (loan)	2023–24	Tweede Divisie	1	0	—		—		—		1	0
Sparta Rotterdam (loan)	2023–24	Eredivisie	24	1	2	0	—		1 (Note: Appearance in European play-offs)	0	27	1
Sparta Rotterdam (loan)	2024–25	Eredivisie	12	0	2	0	—		0	0	14	0
Sparta Rotterdam (loan)	Total		36	1	4	0	—		1	0	41	1
Career total			70	6	5	0	0	0	2	0	77	6
