= 2013–14 Belgian Third Division =

Belgian Third Divisions
- Season: 2013–14

The 2013–14 season of the Belgian Third Divisions was the 87th season of the third-tier football league in Belgium, since its establishment in 1926.

The league is composed of 36 teams divided into two groups of 18 teams each. Teams will play only other teams in their own division.

Locations of the 2013–14 Belgian Third Division A teams

== Group A ==
Pos	Team	Pld	W	D	L	GF	GA	GD	Pts	Promotion or relegation
1	Racing Mechelen (C, P)	34	22	8	4	76	36	+40	74	Promotion to 2014–15 Belgian Second Division
2	Oudenaarde	34	20	7	7	64	37	+27	67	
3	Deinze	34	16	9	9	53	38	+15	57	Qualification for promotion play-off
4	Londerzeel	34	16	9	9	55	41	+14	57	
5	KVV Coxyde	33	15	11	7	66	46	+20	56	
6	Géants Athois	34	13	11	10	47	39	+8	50	
7	Olsa Brakel	34	14	8	12	59	58	+1	50	
8	Gent-Zeehaven	34	13	9	12	51	46	+5	48	
9	Tournai	34	12	10	12	53	55	−2	46	
10	Torhout 1992 KM	34	11	8	15	39	55	−16	41	
11	FCV Dender EH	34	11	7	16	45	59	−14	40	
12	Rupel Boom	34	11	7	16	41	63	−22	40	
13	Hamme	34	10	10	14	60	65	−5	40	
14	Izegem	34	9	11	14	45	59	−14	38	
15	Temse	34	10	7	17	46	56	−10	37	
16	Bornem (O)	34	10	6	18	48	50	−2	36	Qualification for relegation play-off
17	Sint-Niklaas (R)	34	8	9	17	40	50	−10	33	Relegation to 2014–15 Belgian Promotion
18	Standaard Wetteren (R)	34	8	8	18	35	66	−31	32	Relegation to 2014–15 Belgian Promotion

Updated to match(es) played on 4 May 2014. Source: Standing
Rules for classification: 1) points; 2) goal difference; 3) number of goals scored.
(C) Champions; (O) Play-off winners; (P) Promoted; (R) Relegated
Locations of the 2013–14 Belgian Third Division B teams

== Group B ==
Pos	Team	Pld	W	D	L	GF	GA	GD	Pts	Promotion or relegation
1	Woluwe Zaventem (C, P)	34	21	7	6	68	31	+37	70	Promotion to 2014–15 Belgian Second Division
2	Verviers	34	20	9	5	66	28	+38	69	
3	Patro Eisden Maasmechelen (P)	34	18	8	8	61	46	+15	62	Qualification for promotion play-off
4	Turnhout	34	16	8	10	53	44	+9	56	Qualification for promotion play-off
5	La Louvière Centre	34	14	11	9	55	42	+13	53	
6	Union Saint-Gilloise	34	13	10	11	42	35	+7	49	Qualification for promotion play-off
7	Bocholt	34	13	10	11	51	48	+3	49	
8	Sporting Hasselt	34	13	6	15	30	41	−11	45	
9	Sprimont Comblain Sport	34	13	5	16	57	66	−9	44	
10	Wallonne Ciney	34	11	10	13	51	48	+3	43	
11	Union La Calamine	34	12	6	16	63	63	0	42	
12	Cappellen	34	12	6	16	45	64	−19	42	
13	Diegem Sport	34	12	5	17	46	62	−16	41	
14	Berchem Sport	34	11	7	16	48	55	−7	40	
15	Oosterzonen Oosterwijk	34	12	3	19	45	69	−24	39	
16	Grimbergen (O)	34	9	10	15	47	61	−14	37	Qualification for relegation play-off
17	Charleroi Fleurus (R)	34	11	3	20	45	64	−19	36	Relegation to 2014–15 Belgian Promotion
18	Huy (R)	36	9	8	19	37	42	−5	35	Relegation to 2014–15 Belgian Promotion

Updated to match(es) played on 4 May 2014. Source: Standing
Rules for classification: 1) points; 2) goal difference; 3) number of goals scored.
(C) Champions; (O) Play-off winners; (P) Promoted; (R) Relegated

== Third Division Overall Championship ==
09 May 2014
KRC Mechelen	3–2	KV Woluwe-Zaventem

== Promotion to Second Division playoffs ==
=== Quarterfinals ===
Team 1	Agg.	Team 2	1st leg	2nd leg
Union Saint-Gilloise	4–4	Turnhout	0–3	4–1

=== Semifinals ===
Team 1	Agg.	Team 2	1st leg	2nd leg
Union Saint-Gilloise	2–1	Deinze	2–0	0–1
Patro Eisden Maasmechelen	5–1	Hoogstraten (2nd Division)	3–0	2–1

Hoogstraten relegated to Third Division.

=== Finals ===
Team 1	Agg.	Team 2	1st leg	2nd leg
Patro Eisden Maasmechelen	3–2	Union Saint-Gilloise	1–2	2–0

Patro Eisden Maasmechelen promoted to Second Division.

== Relegation playoffs ==
Team 1	Score	Team 2
Grimbergen	2–1	St-Elois-Winkel Sport (Promotion)
Cité Sport GH (Promotion)	1–2	Bornem

Grimbergen and Bornem remained in Second Division.
