= 2014–15 Belgian Third Division =

Belgian Third Divisions
- Season: 2014–15

The 2014–15 season of the Belgian Third Divisions was the 88th season of the third-tier football league in Belgium, since its establishment in 1926.

The league is composed of 36 teams divided into two groups of 18 teams each. Teams play only other teams in their own division.

Locations of the 2014–15 Belgian Third Division A teams

== Group A ==
Pos	Team	Pld	W	D	L	GF	GA	GD	Pts	Promotion or relegation
1	KVV Coxyde (C, P)	34	22	5	7	75	42	+33	71	Promotion to 2015–16 Belgian Second Division
2	Deinze (P)	34	19	8	7	72	29	+43	65 (Note: Automatically promoted as no playoffs were held.)	Promotion to 2015–16 Belgian Second Division
3	Temse	34	17	10	7	64	33	+31	61	
4	Olsa Brakel	34	16	7	11	52	44	+8	55	
5	Rupel Boom	34	16	6	12	55	51	+4	54	
6	Oudenaarde	34	15	9	10	54	42	+12	54	
7	St-Elois-Winkel Sport	34	15	7	12	57	53	+4	52	
8	Hamme	34	13	11	10	55	50	+5	50	
9	FCV Dender EH	34	14	7	13	46	39	+7	49 (Note: Dender won the third period but received no remunerative license and lost appeal to CBAS, thus disqualifying them from the promotion playoffs which were not held.)	
10	Gent-Zeehaven	34	13	7	14	41	48	−7	46	
11	Londerzeel	34	11	11	12	46	43	+3	44	
12	Gullegem	34	11	10	13	35	34	+1	43	
13	Bornem	34	10	12	12	46	53	−7	42	
14	Izegem	34	11	7	16	45	57	−12	40	
15	Torhout 1992 KM	34	10	10	14	33	42	−9	40	
16	Géants Athois (R)	34	9	8	17	39	68	−29	35	Qualification for relegation play-off
17	Zele (R)	34	8	6	20	43	65	−22	30	Relegation to 2015–16 Belgian Fourth Division
18	Tournai (R)	34	4	2	28	27	92	−65	14	Relegation to 2015–16 Belgian Fourth Division

Updated to match(es) played on 3 May 2015. Source: Flashscores.co.uk
Rules for classification: 1) points; 2) number of wins; 3) goals scored; 4) goal difference
(C) Champions; (P) Promoted; (R) Relegated
Notes:
Locations of the 2014–15 Belgian Third Division B teams

== Group B ==
Pos	Team	Pld	W	D	L	GF	GA	GD	Pts	Promotion or relegation
1	Cappellen (C)	34	22	7	5	105	40	+65	73 (Note: Declined promotion despite winning first period.)	
2	Sprimont Comblain Sport	34	21	5	8	69	34	+35	68 (Note: Declined to apply for a license.)	
3	Union Saint-Gilloise (P)	34	20	7	7	54	43	+11	67	Promotion to 2015–16 Belgian Second Division
4	Wallonne Ciney	34	19	8	7	73	42	+31	65	
5	Bocholt	34	18	10	6	77	37	+40	64 (Note: Lacked professional license; failed to qualify for promotion playoffs which were not held.)	
6	Walhain CG	34	17	6	11	58	40	+18	57	
7	Sporting Hasselt	34	16	8	10	59	43	+16	56	
8	Hoogstraten VV	34	15	6	13	58	54	+4	51	
9	Oosterzonen Oosterwijk	34	14	9	11	69	48	+21	51	
10	La Louvière Centre	34	14	5	15	54	57	−3	47	
11	Union La Calamine	34	13	8	13	56	66	−10	47	
12	Berchem Sport	34	14	3	17	57	72	−15	45	
13	Tirlemont	34	9	8	17	48	57	−9	35	
14	Diegem Sport	34	9	8	17	40	61	−21	35	
15	Grimbergen	34	8	11	15	34	46	−12	35	
16	Visé (R)	34	8	4	22	40	83	−43	28	Qualification for relegation play-off
17	Verviers	34	6	7	21	43	95	−52	25	Club folded in June 2015
18	Turnhout (R)	34	1	4	29	23	109	−86	7	Relegation to 2015–16 Belgian Fourth Division

Updated to match(es) played on 3 May 2015. Source: Flashscores.co.uk
Rules for classification: 1) points; 2) number of wins; 3) goals scored; 4) goal difference
(C) Champions; (P) Promoted; (R) Relegated
Notes:

No promotion playoffs contested. Deinze and Union Saint-Gilloise promoted to Second Division.

== Third Division Overall Championship ==
8 May 2015
R Cappellen FC	2–1	KVV Coxyde

== Relegation playoffs ==
Team 1	Score	Team 2
Acrenoise (Promotion)	5–0 (forfeit)	Géants Athois
Acrenoise (Promotion)	1–1 (5–3 p)	Visé

Acrenoise promoted to Third Division.
