= Darryl Bäly =

Aruban footballer (born 1998)

Personal information
- Date of birth: 19 January 1998 (age 28)
- Place of birth: Zaandijk, Netherlands
- Height: 1.78 m (5 ft 10 in)
- Position: Left back

Team information
- Current team: Lisse
- Number: 5

Youth career
- –2009: ZVV Zaandijk
- 2009–2013: KFC Koog aan de Zaan
- 2013–2018: Volendam

Senior career*
Years	Team	Apps	(Gls)
2018–2021	Jong Volendam	47	(0)
2018–2021	Volendam	36	(1)
2020	→ Telstar (loan)	0	(0)
2021–2023	OFC	52	(3)
2023–	Lisse	56	(1)

International career^{‡}
2021–	Aruba	9	(1)
- * Club domestic league appearances and goals as of 4 August 2025 ‡ National team caps and goals as of 4 August 2025

Darryl Bäly (born 19 January 1998) is a professional footballer who plays as a left back for Lisse. Born in the Netherlands, he represents the Aruba national team.

== Club career ==
He made his Eerste Divisie debut for Volendam on 24 August 2018 in a game against Sparta Rotterdam, as a starter.

In the 2019–20 season, Bäly was not a part of the plans of head coach Wim Jonk and he mainly played with the reserve team Jong Volendam in the Tweede Divisie. On 31 January 2020 he was sent on loan to Telstar for the remainder of the season.

In May 2021, Bäly signed with Derde Divisie club OFC Oostzaan after his contract with Volendam was not extended. He moved to Lisse in summer 2023.

== International ==
Bäly made his Aruba national football team debut on 2 June 2021 in the 2022 FIFA World Cup qualification game against Cayman Islands.
