= 2021–22 Excelsior Rotterdam season =

Dutch football club season

Excelsior Rotterdam
2021–22 season
- Stadium: Van Donge & De Roo Stadion
- Eerste Divisie: 6th (Note: Promoted to Eredivisie via play-offs.)
- KNVB Cup: 2nd round
- Top goalscorer: League: Thijs Dallinga (32 goals); All: Thijs Dallinga (36 goals)
- Biggest win: 5-0 FC Den Bosch (a) 5th week
- Biggest defeat: 4-1 (NAC Breda (a) 9th week FC Eindhoven (a) 25th week SC Telstar (h) 34th week); 3-0 Almere City FC (a) 33rd week
- All statistics correct as of 19 October 2025.

The 2021–22 season was Excelsior Rotterdam's 31st season in the Eerste Divisie (3rd consecutive).

Excelsior Rotterdam finished the regular season in 6th place and secured promotion to the Eredivisie after defeating ADO Den Haag in a penalty shootout, winning 8–7.

The club also participated in the 2021–22 KNVB Cup, where their run ended in the second round with a 4–2 loss after extra time against FC Groningen.

Thijs Dallinga was the top scorer of the club in this season with 36 goals; 32 goals in Eerste Divisie and 4 goals in promotion play-offs..

Reuven Niemeijer was the most appeared player in this season with 46 appearances; 38 appearances in the Eerste Divisie, 6 appearances in the promotion play-offs and 2 appearances in the KNVB Cup.

== Players ==
=== First-team squad ===
Note: Flags indicate national team as defined under FIFA eligibility rules; some limited exceptions apply. Players may hold more than one non-FIFA nationality.

No.	Pos.	Nation	Player
1	GK	NED	Stijn van Gassel
2	DF	BEL	Siebe Horemans
4	DF	NED	Redouan El Yaakoubi
5	DF	SUI	Nikita Vlasenko
6	DF	NED	Abdallah Aberkane
7	FW	NED	Hugo Botermans
7	FW	NED	Nikolas Agrafiotis
8	MF	NED	Mats Wieffer
9	FW	NED	Thijs Dallinga
10	FW	NED	Reuven Niemeijer
11	FW	NED	Marouan Azarkan
14	FW	MAR	Couhaib Driouech
15	MF	NED	Noa Dundas
16	DF	NED	Sven Nieuwpoort
17	FW	NED	Dave van Delft
18	MF	FRA	Modeste Duku Mbenga

No.	Pos.	Nation	Player
20	GK	BEL	Bo Geens
21	MF	NED	Kenzo Goudmijn
22	DF	NED	Jaimy Buter
24	DF	ENG	Brandon Ormonde-Ottewill
27	MF	NED	Michael Chacon
28	DF	IND	Nathan Tjoe-A-On
32	MF	NED	Joshua Eijgenraam
33	MF	NED	Julian Baas
33	MF	NED	Julian Baas
34	MF	NED	Serano Seymor
35	FW	NED	Raphaël Eyongo
35	FW	NED	Brent Vugts
36	FW	NED	Delano Gouda
37	FW	NED	Luuk Admiraal
38	GK	NED	Pascal Kuiper

== Transfers ==
=== In ===
Pos.	Player	Transferred from	Fee	Date
DF	(Netherlands) Redouan El Yaakoubi	(Netherlands) SC Telstar	Free	1 July 2021
GK	(Netherlands) Stijn van Gassel	(Netherlands) Helmond Sport	Free	1 July 2021
FW	(Netherlands) Thijs Dallinga	(Netherlands) FC Groningen	Free	1 July 2021
DF	(Netherlands) Sven Nieuwpoort	(Netherlands) SC Cambuur	Free	27 July 2021
GK	(Belgium) Bo Geens	(Netherlands) TOP Oss	Free	2 August 2021
GK	(Belgium) Bo Geens	(Belgium) K.V. Mechelen	Free	2 August 2021
FW	(Morocco) Marouan Azarkan	(Netherlands) Feyenoord	On loan	9 August 2021
FW	(Netherlands) Michael Chacón	(Colombia) Atlético Nacional	On loan	17 August 2021
MF	(Netherlands) Kenzo Goudmijn	(Netherlands) AZ Alkmaar	On loan	7 January 2022
FW	(Netherlands) Luuk Admiraal	(Netherlands) ASWH	Free	24 January 2022
FW	(Netherlands) Nikolas Agrafiotis	(Netherlands) FC Dordrecht		31 January 2022

=== Out ===
Pos.	Player	Transferred to	Fee	Date
DF	(Belgium) Hervé Matthys	Without club		1 July 2021
MF	(Netherlands) Luigi Bruins	(Netherlands) VV Smitshoek	Free	1 July 2021
MF	(Netherlands) Niek den Heeten	Without club		1 July 2021
DF	(Netherlands) Robin van der Meer	(Netherlands) Helmond Sport	Free	1 July 2021
DF	(Netherlands) Sander Fischer	(Netherlands) VV Capelle	Free	1 July 2021
FW	(Netherlands) Thomas Verhaar	(Netherlands) Amsterdamsche FC	Free	1 July 2021
FW	(Netherlands) Joël Zwarts	(Germany) SSV Jahn Regensburg	€425,000	15 July 2021
GK	(Netherlands) Maarten de Fockert	Without club		16 July 2021
FW	(Iceland) Elías Már Ómarsson	(France) Nîmes Olympique	€500,000	21 July 2021
DF	(Netherlands) Thomas Oude Kotte	(Denmark) Vendsyssel FF		23 July 2021
FW	(Belgium) Dylan Seys	(Netherlands) Helmond Sport	Free	26 July 2021
FW	(Netherlands) Mitchell van Rooijen	(Netherlands) VVV-Venlo		26 July 2021

== Competitions ==
=== Overall record ===
Competition	First match	Last match	Starting round	Final position	Record							
Competition	First match	Last match	Starting round	Final position	Pld	W	D	L	GF	GA	GD	Win %
Eerste Divisie	6 August 2021	6 May 2022	Week 1	6th	38	19	9	10	82	57	+25	50.00
Promotion playoffs	10 May 2022	29 May 2022	1st round	Final	6	3	3	0	15	7	+8	50.00
KNVB Cup	27 October 2021	15 December 2021	1st round	2nd round	2	1	0	1	5	4	+1	50.00
Total					46	23	12	11	102	68	+34	50.00

Source: ESPN

=== Eerste Divisie ===
==== League table ====
Pos	Team	Pld	W	D	L	GF	GA	GD	Pts	Promotion or qualification
4	ADO Den Haag (Note: Winner of the First Period (Rounds 1–9))	38	22	7	9	76	53	+23	67 (Note: ADO Den Haag were deducted a total of six points for breaking the financial standards set by the Royal Dutch Football Association.)	Qualification to promotion play-offs
5	Roda JC Kerkrade	38	18	12	8	77	50	+27	66	Qualification to promotion play-offs
6	Excelsior (Note: Winner of the Second Period (Rounds 10–19)) (O, P)	38	19	9	10	82	57	+25	66	Qualification to promotion play-offs
7	Jong Ajax	38	18	9	11	82	63	+19	63	Reserve teams are not eligible to be promoted to the Eredivisie
8	NAC Breda	38	16	11	11	60	45	+15	59	Qualification to promotion play-offs

Updated to match(es) played on 6 May 2022. Source: Soccerway, Keuken Kampioen Divisie (in Dutch)
Rules for classification: Season in progress: 1) Most points won; 2) Less points lost; 3) Goal difference; 4) Goals scored; 5) Alphabetical order; End of season: 1) Points; 2) Goal difference; 3) Goals scored; 4) Head-to-head points; 5) Head-to-head goal difference; 6) Head-to-head away goals scored; 7) Play-off if relevant for deciding champion, relegation or participating in a European league, otherwise by draw. 8) Penalty shoot-out (only after a play-off)
(O) Play-off winners; (P) Promoted

==== Results summary ====
Overall								Home						Away					
Pld	W	D	L	GF	GA	GD	Pts	W	D	L	GF	GA	GD	W	D	L	GF	GA	GD
38	19	9	10	82	57	+25	66	9	5	5	44	28	+16	10	4	5	38	29	+9

Source: https://www.espn.nl/voetbal/stand/_/competitie/NED.1/season/2020

==== Results by round ====
Round	1	2	3	4	5	6	7	8	9	10	11	12	13	14	15	16	17	18	19	20	21	22	23	24	25	26	27	28	29	30	31	32	33	34	35	36	37	38
Ground	H	A	H	A	A	H	A	H	A	A	H	A	H	A	H	A	H	A	H	A	H	A	H	H	A	H	A	H	H	A	A	H	A	H	A	H	A	H
Result	L	W	D	W	W	W	L	W	L	W	W	W	L	W	D	W	W	W	W	D	D	L	L	L	L	W	W	W	W	W	D	W	L	L	D	D	D	D
Position																																						6

Source: ESPN
A = Away; H = Home; W = Win; D = Draw; L = Loss

=== Matches ===
==== 1st half ====
6 August 2021 1st week	Excelsior Rotterdam	0-1	TOP Oss	Rotterdam
20:00		Report	Jearl Margaritha 41'	Stadium: Van Donge & De Roo Stadion; Attendance: 1,500

13 August 2021 2nd week	Roda JC Kerkrade	1-2	Excelsior Rotterdam	Kerkrade
20:00	Abdallah Aberkane 83' (o.g.)	Report	Thijs Dallinga 7'; Redouan El Yaakoubi 24'	Stadium: Parkstad Limburg Stadion; Attendance: 5,216

20 August 2021 3rd week	Excelsior Rotterdam	1-1	FC Volendam	Rotterdam
20:00	Thijs Dallinga 40'	Report	Robert Mühren 45+1'	Stadium: Van Donge & De Roo Stadion; Attendance: 2,010

27 August 2021 4th week	Jong Ajax	1-2	Excelsior Rotterdam	Duivendrecht, Amsterdam
20:00	Kenneth Taylor 89' (pen.)	Report	Redouan El Yaakoubi 49'; Marouan Azarkan 76'	Stadium: Sportpark De Toekomst; Attendance: 606

3 September 2021 5th week	FC Den Bosch	0-5	Excelsior Rotterdam	Den Bosch
18:45		Report	Thijs Dallinga 19' 26' 30' 74'; Reuven Niemeijer 86'	Stadium: De Vliert; Attendance: 2,927

10 September 2021 6th week	Excelsior Rotterdam	3-1	FC Dordrecht	Rotterdam
20:00	Marouan Azarkan 47'; Julian Baas 60'; Thijs Dallinga 90+3'	Report	Nikolas Agrafiotis 29'	Stadium: Van Donge & De Roo Stadion; Attendance: 2,361

17 September 2021 7th week	De Graafschap	3-1	Excelsior Rotterdam	Doetinchem
20:00	Jasper van Heertum 54'; Joey Konings 67'; Elmo Lieftink 77'	Report	Marouan Azarkan 57'	Stadium: De Vijverberg; Attendance: 7,274

24 September 2021 8th week	Excelsior Rotterdam	3-0	Jong PSV	Rotterdam
20:00	Thijs Dallinga 10' 90+1'; Couhaib Driouech 90+3'	Report		Stadium: Van Donge & De Roo Stadion; Attendance: 2,034

1 October 2021 9th week	NAC Breda	4-1	Excelsior Rotterdam	Breda
20:00	Thom Haye 45+1'; Redouan El Yaakoubi 71' (o.g.); Ralf Seuntjens 85'; Kaj de Rooij 87'	Report	Modeste Duku Mbenga 64'	Stadium: Rat Verlegh Stadion; Attendance: 14,823

9 October 2021 10th week	FC Emmen	0-1	Excelsior Rotterdam	Emmen
18:45		Report	Thijs Dallinga 32'	Stadium: De Oude Meerdijk; Attendance: 7,625

15 October 2021 11th week	Excelsior Rotterdam	3-0	VVV-Venlo	Rotterdam
20:00	Reuven Niemeijer 45' 53'; Thijs Dallinga 56'	Report		Stadium: Van Donge & De Roo Stadion; Attendance: 2,734

22 October 2021 12th week	ADO Den Haag	0-2	Excelsior Rotterdam	The Hague
20:00		Report	Jamal Amofa 52' (o.g.); Redouan El Yaakoubi 82'	Stadium: ADO Den Haag Stadium; Attendance: 7,018

30 October 2021 13th week	Excelsior Rotterdam	3-4	FC Eindhoven	Rotterdam
16:30	Reuven Niemeijer 10'; Thijs Dallinga 55'; Mats Wieffer 61'	Report	Pieter Bogaers 37'; Barnabás Rácz 45+2'; Joey Sleegers 47'; Collin Seedorf 77'	Stadium: Van Donge & De Roo Stadion; Attendance: 2,534

6 November 2021 14th week	SC Telstar	2-5	Excelsior Rotterdam	Velsen-Zuid
16:30	Cas Dijkstra 10'; Rein Smit 89'	Report	Thijs Dallinga 17' 33' (pen.) 36' 49'; Julian Baas 58'	Stadium: BUKO Stadion; Attendance: 2,763

14 November 2021 15th week	Excelsior Rotterdam	4-4	Almere City FC	Rotterdam
20:00	Reuven Niemeijer 11' 82'; Thijs Dallinga 16'; Stije Resink 54' (o.g.)	Report	Lance Duijvestijn 25'; Jonas Arweiler 69' 74' 78'	Stadium: Van Donge & De Roo Stadion

19 November 2021 16th week	Helmond Sport	1-5	Excelsior Rotterdam	Helmond
20:00	Jellert Van Landschoot 68'	Report	Siebe Horemans 5'; Reuven Niemeijer 17'; Thijs Dallinga 55' 58' 82'	Stadium: Stadion De Braak

26 November 2021 17th week	Excelsior Rotterdam	2-1	Jong FC Utrecht	Rotterdam
20:00	Thijs Dallinga 48'; Marouan Azarkan 81'	Report	Eros Maddy 19'	Stadium: Van Donge & De Roo Stadion

6 December 2021 18th week	Jong AZ	0-2	Excelsior Rotterdam	The Hague
20:00		Report	Marouan Azarkan 80'; Thijs Dallinga 90+1'	Stadium: AFAS Trainingscomplex

10 December 2021 19th week	Excelsior Rotterdam	2-1	MVV Maastricht	Rotterdam
20:00	Thijs Dallinga 21' 50'	Report	Mats Wieffer 84' (o.g.)	Stadium: Van Donge & De Roo Stadion

18 December 2021 20th week	FC Dordrecht	1-1	Excelsior Rotterdam	Dordrecht
20:00	Jacky Donkor 52'	Report	Thijs Dallinga 87' (pen.)	Stadium: Stadion Krommedijk

==== 2nd half ====
14 January 2022 21st week	Excelsior Rotterdam	0-0	De Graafschap	Rotterdam
20:00		Report		Stadium: Van Donge & De Roo Stadion

21 January 2022 22nd week	Jong PSV	3-0	Excelsior Rotterdam	Eindhoven
20:00	Fedde Leysen 57'; Johan Bakayoko 68'; Mohamed Nassoh 78'	Report		Stadium: De Herdgang

25 January 2022 23rd week	Excelsior Rotterdam	2-3	ADO Den Haag	Rotterdam
20:00	Reuven Niemeijer 40'; Couhaib Driouech 86'	Report	Samy Bourard 19'; Sem Steijn 36'; Thomas Verheydt 58'	Stadium: Van Donge & De Roo Stadion

29 January 2022 24th week	Excelsior Rotterdam	0-1	FC Emmen	Rotterdam
16:30		Report	Jeroen Veldmate 73' (pen.)	Stadium: Van Donge & De Roo Stadion

7 February 2022 25th week	FC Eindhoven	4-1	Excelsior Rotterdam	Eindhoven
20:00	Joey Sleegers 7' 87'; Charles-Andreas Brym 9'; Valentino Vermeulen 14'	Report	Marouan Azarkan 24'	Stadium: Jan Louwers Stadion

11 February 2022 26th week	Excelsior Rotterdam	6-2	Jong Ajax	Rotterdam
20:00	Anass Salah-Eddine 32' (o.g.); Thijs Dallinga 38' 71'; Reuven Niemeijer 45+1'; Redouan El Yaakoubi 57'; Calvin Raatsie 90+3'	Report	Christian Rasmussen 4'; Liam van Gelderen 64'	Stadium: Van Donge & De Roo Stadion

21 February 2022 27th week	Jong FC Utrecht	0-1	Excelsior Rotterdam	Utrecht
20:00		Report	Reuven Niemeijer 18'	Stadium: Sportcomplex Zoudenbalch

25 February 2022 28th week	Excelsior Rotterdam	2-0	Roda JC Kerkrade	Rotterdam
20:00	Reuven Niemeijer 12'; Marouan Azarkan 26'	Report		Stadium: Van Donge & De Roo Stadion

4 March 2022 29th week	Excelsior Rotterdam	4-0	FC Den Bosch	Rotterdam
20:00	Thijs Dallinga 17' 89'; Mats Wieffer 47'; Marouan Azarkan 60'	Report		Stadium: Van Donge & De Roo Stadion

11 March 2022 30th week	FC Volendam	2-5	Excelsior Rotterdam	Volendam
20:00	Robert Mühren 34' (pen.); Boy Deul 54'	Report	Kenzo Goudmijn 2'; Reuven Niemeijer 15'; Thijs Dallinga 18'; Marouan Azarkan 29'; Michael Chacon 90+4'	Stadium: Kras Stadion

18 March 2022 31st week	TOP Oss	1-1	Excelsior Rotterdam	Oss
20:00	Jearl Margaritha 77'	Report	Reuven Niemeijer 86'	Stadium: Frans Heesen Stadion

26 March 2022 32nd week	Excelsior Rotterdam	3-0	Helmond Sport	Rotterdam
18:45	Mats Wieffer 9'; Thijs Dallinga 48'; Redouan El Yaakoubi 90+3'	Report		Stadium: Van Donge & De Roo Stadion

1 April 2022 33rd week	Almere City FC	3-0	Excelsior Rotterdam	Almere
20:00	Jeffry Puriel 51'; Ilias Alhaft 54'; Lance Duijvestijn 69'	Report		Stadium: Yanmar Stadion

8 April 2022 34th week	Excelsior Rotterdam	1-4	SC Telstar	Rotterdam
20:00	Mats Wieffer 40'	Report	Sven van Doorm 6'; Jip Molenaar 29'; Ozan Kökcü 52' (pen.); Anwar Bensabouh 90+1'	Stadium: Van Donge & De Roo Stadion

15 April 2022 35th week	MVV Maastricht	1-1	Excelsior Rotterdam	Maastricht
20:00	Mart Remans 6'	Report	Reuven Niemeijer 2'	Stadium: De Geusselt

22 April 2022 36th week	Excelsior Rotterdam	3-3	Jong AZ	Rotterdam
20:00	Reuven Niemeijer 30' 66'; Loek Postma 75' (o.g.)	Report	Zico Buurmeester 24' 57'; Fedde de Jong 81'	Stadium: Van Donge & De Roo Stadion

29 April 2022 37th week	VVV-Venlo	2-2	Excelsior Rotterdam	Venlo
20:00	Joeri Schroyen 49'; Sven Braken 72'	Report	Couhaib Driouech 83'; Marouan Azarkan 90+1'	Stadium: De Koel

6 May 2022 38th week	Excelsior Rotterdam	2-2	NAC Breda	Rotterdam
20:00	Thijs Dallinga 45+1'; Reuven Niemeijer 48'	Report	Odysseus Velanas 10'; Dion Malone 90+4'	Stadium: Van Donge & De Roo Stadion

=== Promotion Play-offs ===
10 May 2022 1st round 1st match	Excelsior Rotterdam	2-2	Roda JC Kerkrade	Rotterdam
21:00	Kenzo Goudmijn 9'; Thijs Dallinga 42' (pen.)	Report	Dylan Vente 67'; Stefano Marzo 68'	Stadium: Van Donge & De Roo Stadion; Attendance: 3,178

14 May 2022 1st round 2nd match	Roda JC Kerkrade	0-2 (a.e.t.)	Excelsior Rotterdam	Kerkrade
20:00		Report	Couhaib Driouech 95'; Nikolas Agrafiotis 120+2'	Stadium: Parkstad Limburg Stadion; Attendance: 14,763

Excelsior Rotterdam won 4–2 on aggregate.

18 May 2022 Semi-final; 1st match	Excelsior Rotterdam	3-0	Heracles Almelo	Rotterdam
18:45	Marouan Azarkan 21'; Thijs Dallinga 74'; Couhaib Driouech 85'	Report		Stadium: Van Donge & De Roo Stadion; Attendance: 4,400

21 May 2022 Semi-final; 2nd match	Heracles Almelo	1-3	Excelsior Rotterdam	Almelo
20:00	Sinan Bakış 28'	Report	Thijs Dallinga 47'; Mats Wieffer 63'; Nikolas Agrafiotis 83'	Stadium: Asito Stadion; Attendance: 6,924

Excelsior Rotterdam won 6–1 on aggregate.

24 May 2022 Final; 1st match	Excelsior Rotterdam	1-1	ADO Den Haag	Rotterdam
20:00	Marouan Azarkan 47'	Report	Sem Steijn 90+2'	Stadium: Van Donge & De Roo Stadion; Attendance: 4,400

29 May 2022 Final; 2nd match	ADO Den Haag	4-4 (a.e.t.) (8–7 p)	Excelsior Rotterdam	The Hague
18:00	Thomas Verheydt 34'; Felipe Pires 40'; Sem Steijn 47'; Sacha Komljenovic 97'	Report	Marouan Azarkan 78'; Reuven Niemeijer 83'; Thijs Dallinga 90+3'; Redouan El Yaakoubi 108'	Stadium: ADO Den Haag Stadium; Attendance: 15,000
	Penalties
	Boy Kemper (penalty scored); Hervé Matthys (penalty scored); Dhoraso Klas (penalty missed); Sacha Komljenovic (penalty scored); Felipe Pires (penalty scored); David Puclin (penalty scored); Amar Ćatić (penalty scored); Silvinho Esajas (penalty scored); Jamal Amofa (penalty missed)		Redouan El Yaakoubi (penalty scored); Julian Baas (penalty scored); Raphaël Eyongo (penalty missed); Sven Nieuwpoort (penalty scored); Couhaib Driouech (penalty scored); Brandon Ormonde-Ottewill (penalty scored); Luuk Admiraal (penalty scored); Mats Wieffer (penalty scored); Siebe Horemans (penalty scored)

5–5 on aggregate. Excelsior Rotterdam won 8–7 on penalties.

=== KNVB Cup ===
27 October 2021 1st round	Ijsselmeervogels	0-3	Excelsior Rotterdam	Bunschoten
20:00		Report	Hugo Botermans 5' 52'; Reuven Niemeijer 58'	Stadium: Sportpark De Westmaat

15 December 2021 2nd round	Excelsior Rotterdam	2-4 (a.e.t.)	FC Groningen	Rotterdam
20:00	Reuven Niemeijer 23'; Julian Baas 69'	Report	Cyril Ngonge 45+1'; Mohamed El Hankouri 85' (pen.); Jørgen Strand Larsen 111' 115'	Stadium: Van Donge & De Roo Stadion

== Player statistics ==
=== Appearances and goals ===
No.	Pos	Nat	Player	Total		Eerste Divisie		Promotion play-offs		KNVB Cup	
No.	Pos	Nat	Player	Apps	Goals	Apps	Goals	Apps	Goals	Apps	Goals
1	GK	(Netherlands) NED	Stijn van Gassel	44	0	36	0	6	0	2	0
2	DF	(Belgium) BEL	Siebe Horemans	44	1	36	1	6	0	2	0
4	DF	(Netherlands) NED	Redouan El Yaakoubi	41	6	33	5	6	1	2	0
5	DF	(Sweden) SWE	Nikita Vlasenko	26	0	21	0	4	0	1	0
6	DF	(Netherlands) NED	Abdallah Aberkane	33	0	31	0	0	0	2	0
7	FW	(Netherlands) NED	Hugo Botermans	9	2	8	0	0	0	1	2
7	FW	(Netherlands) NED	Nikolas Agrafiotis	14	2	11	0	3	2	0	0
8	MF	(Netherlands) NED	Mats Wieffer	42	5	34	4	6	1	2	0
9	FW	(Netherlands) NED	Thijs Dallinga	44	36	37	32	6	4	1	0
10	FW	(Netherlands) NED	Reuven Niemeijer	46	20	38	17	6	1	2	2
11	FW	(Netherlands) NED	Marouan Azarkan	37	13	31	10	5	3	1	0
14	FW	(Morocco) MAR	Couhaib Driouech	33	5	26	3	5	2	2	0
15	MF	(Netherlands) NED	Noa Dundas	3	0	2	0	0	0	1	0
16	DF	(Netherlands) NED	Sven Nieuwpoort	40	0	33	0	6	0	1	0
17	FW	(Netherlands) NED	Dave van Delft	1	0	1	0	0	0	0	0
18	FW	(France) FRA	Modeste Duku Mbenga	20	1	18	1	0	0	2	0
20	GK	(Belgium) BEL	Bo Geens	1	0	1	0	0	0	0	0
21	MF	(Netherlands) NED	Kenzo Goudmijn	24	2	18	1	6	1	0	0
22	DF	(Netherlands) NED	Jaimy Buter	5	0	4	0	0	0	1	0
24	DF	(England) ENG	Brandon Ormonde-Ottewill	31	0	24	0	5	0	2	0
27	MF	(Netherlands) NED	Michael Chacon	34	1	28	1	4	0	2	0
28	DF	(Indonesia) IDN	Nathan Tjoe-A-On	16	0	10	0	6	0	0	0
32	MF	(Netherlands) NED	Joshua Eijgenraam	39	0	32	0	6	0	1	0
33	MF	(Netherlands) NED	Julian Baas	45	3	37	2	6	0	2	1
34	DF	(Netherlands) NED	Serano Seymor	6	0	6	0	0	0	0	0
35	FW	(Netherlands) NED	Brent Vugts	1	0	1	0	0	0	0	0
35	FW	(Netherlands) NED	Raphaël Eyongo	8	0	6	0	1	0	1	0
36	FW	(Netherlands) NED	Delano Gouda	3	0	3	0	0	0	0	0
37	FW	(Netherlands) NED	Luuk Admiraal	1	0	0	0	1	0	0	0
38	GK	(Netherlands) NED	Pascal Kuiper	2	0	2	0	0	0	0	0

=== Clean sheets ===
#	Player	Eerste Divisie	Promotion play-offs	KNVB Cup	Total
1	(Netherlands) Stijn van Gassel	10	2	1	13
2	(Belgium) Bo Geens	1	0	0	1
Total		11	2	1	14

=== Disciplinary record ===
#	Player	Eredivisie		Promotion play-offs		KNVB Cup		Total	
#	Player	Booked	Sent off (straight red)	Booked	Sent off (straight red)	Booked	Sent off (straight red)	Booked	Sent off (straight red)
1	(Netherlands) Michael Chacon	4	1	0	1	0	0	4	2
2	(Netherlands) Redouan El Yaakoubi	5	1	0	0	0	0	5	1
3	(Netherlands) Marouan Azarkan	3	1	1	0	0	0	4	1
4	(Netherlands) Jaimy Buter	0	0	0	0	0	0	0	1
5	(Netherlands) Mats Wieffer	6	0	2	0	2	0	8	0
6	(Belgium) Siebe Horemans	5	0	2	0	0	0	7	0
7	(Netherlands) Sven Nieuwpoort	4	0	1	0	0	0	5	0
8	(Netherlands) Joshua Eijgenraam	3	0	0	0	0	0	3	0
8	(France) Modeste Duku Mbenga	3	0	0	0	0	0	3	0
8	(Netherlands) Reuven Niemeijer	3	0	0	0	0	0	3	0
8	(Netherlands) Thijs Dallinga	2	0	0	0	1	0	3	0
12	(Netherlands) Nikolas Agrafiotis	1	0	1	0	0	0	2	0
13	(Netherlands) Abdallah Aberkane	1	0	0	0	0	0	1	0
13	(England) Brandon Ormonde-Ottewill	1	0	0	0	0	0	1	0
13	(Morocco) Couhaib Driouech	1	0	0	0	0	0	1	0
13	(Netherlands) Julian Baas	1	0	0	0	0	0	1	0
13	(India) Nathan Tjoe-A-On	0	0	1	0	0	0	1	0
13	(Sweden) Nikita Vlasenko	1	0	0	0	0	0	1	0
