= 2022–23 Excelsior Rotterdam season =

Dutch football club season

Excelsior Rotterdam
2022–23 season
- Chairman: Bob de Lange
- Manager: Marinus Dijkhuizen
- Stadium: Van Donge & De Roo Stadion
- Eredivisie: 15th
- KNVB Cup: 2nd round
- Top goalscorer: League: Kenzo Goudmijn; Lazaros Lamprou (4 each); All: Lazaros Lamprou (6)
- Highest home attendance: 4,400 (3rd, 11th, 13th, 15th, 17th 19th, 20th, 24th, 27th, 29th, 31st, 33rd weeks)
- Lowest home attendance: 2,000 (KNVB 1st round)
- Average home league attendance: 4,423
- Biggest win: Excelsior Rotterdam 5–1 MVV Maastricht
- Biggest defeat: Ajax 7–1 Excelsior

The 2022–23 season was the 121st season in the existence of Excelsior Rotterdam and the club's first season back in the top flight of Dutch football.

The season was Excelsior Rotterdam's 23rd season in the Eredivisie (1st consecutive) and the team concluded the regular Eredivisie season in 15th place.

In the KNVB Cup, Excelsior Rotterdam's participation ended in the second round following a 4–1 defeat to AZ Alkmaar.

Lazaros Lamprou was the top scorer of the club in this season with 6 goals; 4 goals in Eredivisie and 2 goals in KNVB Cup.

Kenzo Goudmijn and Siebe Horemans were most appeared players in this season with 36 appearances; 34 appearances in the Eredivisie, 2 appearances in the KNVB Cup.

== Players ==
As of 31 January 2023

Note: Flags indicate national team as defined under FIFA eligibility rules; some limited exceptions apply. Players may hold more than one non-FIFA nationality.

No.	Pos.	Nation	Player
1	GK	NED	Stijn van Gassel
2	DF	BEL	Siebe Horemans
3	DF	NED	Kik Pierie
4	DF	NED	Redouan El Yaakoubi (captain)
5	MF	GER	Adrian Fein
6	MF	NED	Joshua Eijgenraam
7	FW	SRB	Nikolas Agrafiotis
8	MF	NED	Kenzo Goudmijn
9	FW	NED	Reda Kharchouch
10	FW	NED	Marouan Azarkan
11	MF	BEL	Jacky Donkor
12	DF	FRA	Arthur Zagré
14	FW	NED	Couhaib Driouech
15	MF	NED	Noah Naujoks

No.	Pos.	Nation	Player
16	DF	NED	Sven Nieuwpoort
17	DF	GER	Maxime Awoudja
17	FW	NED	Luuk Admiraal
18	GK	NED	Norbert Alblas
19	FW	NED	Raphaël Eyongo
21	MF	MAR	Yassin Ayoub
22	MF	GRE	Lazaros Lamprou
23	MF	NED	Peer Koopmeiners
27	FW	NED	Vicente Besuijen
28	DF	IDN	Nathan Tjoe-A-On
29	FW	NED	Mike van Duinen
33	MF	NED	Julian Baas
34	DF	NED	Serano Seymor
37	MF	CUW	Nathangelo Markelo

== Transfers ==
=== In ===
Pos.	Player	Transferred from	Fee	Date
FW	(Netherlands) Reda Kharchouch	(Netherlands) Sparta Rotterdam	End of loan	30 June 2022
FW	(Belgium) Jacky Donkor	(Netherlands) FC Dordrecht		21 July 2022
FW	(Netherlands) Mike van Duinen	(Greece) OFI Crete F.C.	Free	19 August 2022
MF	(Germany) Adrian Fein	(Germany) FC Bayern Munich	Free	24 August 2022
FW	(Greece) Lazaros Lamprou	(Greece) PAOK FC	€450,000	31 August 2022
DF	(Germany) Maxime Awoudja	(Germany) VfB Stuttgart	Free	31 August 2022
GK	(Netherlands) Norbert Alblas	(Netherlands) TOP Oss		31 August 2022
DF	(Netherlands) Kik Pierie	(Netherlands) ASWH	On loan	1 January 2023
DF	(Netherlands) Peer Koopmeiners	(Netherlands) AZ Alkmaar	On loan	10 January 2023
MF	(Netherlands) Noah Naujoks	(Netherlands) Feyenoord		30 January 2023
DF	(France) Arthur Zagré	(France) AS Monaco FC	On loan	31 January 2023
FW	(Netherlands) Vicente Besuijen	(Scotland) Aberdeen F.C.	On loan	31 January 2023

=== Out ===
Pos.	Player	Transferred to	Fee	Date
DF	(Switzerland) Nikita Vlasenko	(Italy) Juventus FC	End of loan	30 June 2022
DF	(Netherlands) Abdallah Aberkane	Without club		1 July 2022
GK	(Belgium) Bo Geens	Without club		1 July 2022
DF	(England) Brandon Ormonde-Ottewill	Without club		1 July 2022
MF	(Netherlands) Mats Wieffer	(Netherlands) Feyenoord	€575,000	1 July 2022
MF	(Netherlands) Reuven Niemeijer	(Italy) Brescia Calcio	Free	1 July 2022
FW	(Netherlands) Thijs Dallinga	(France) Toulouse FC	€2,500,000	1 July 2022
FW	(France) Modeste Duku	(France) FC Borgo	Free	2 August 2022

== Pre-season and friendlies ==
Win Draw Loss Fixtures

9 July 2022 Friendly	NAC Breda (Netherlands)	1–1	(Netherlands) Excelsior	Zundert, Netherlands
19:00 CEST (UTC+2)	Ismail-Mahamed 89'	Report	El Yaakoubi 52'	Stadium: Sportpark de Wildert
Note: Match was played in three 30-minute periods

12 July 2022 Friendly	Almere City (Netherlands)	2–0	(Netherlands) Excelsior	Netherlands
13:00 CEST (UTC+2)	Pouwels 67'; Huijsman 85'	Report		Attendance: 0
Note: Match was played in four 30-minute periods

16 July 2022 Friendly	Excelsior (Netherlands)	3–2	(Netherlands) Dordrecht	Rotterdam, Netherlands
19:00 CEST (UTC+2)	Kharchouch 43'; Driouech 45', 73'	Report	Doesburg 68' (pen.); Savastano 81'	Stadium: Stadion Woudestein; Referee: Sven Spaan

22 July 2022 Friendly	Heracles Almelo (Netherlands)	2–1	(Netherlands) Excelsior	Almelo, Netherlands
18:00 CEST (UTC+2)	Bakış 54'; Armenteros 81'	Report	Goudmijn 85'	Stadium: Erve Asito

30 July 2022 Friendly	Heerenveen (Netherlands)	3–1	(Netherlands) Excelsior	Heerenveen
19:00 CEST (UTC+2)	Van Aken 45', 85'; Sarr 47'	Report	Admiraal 73'	Stadium: Abe Lenstra Stadion; Referee: Jeroen Mans

8 November 2022 Friendly	Jong FC Utrecht (Netherlands)	1–1	(Netherlands) Excelsior	Utrecht, Netherlands
13:00 CET (UTC+1)	Van Eldik 90'		Agrafiotis 17'	Stadium: Sportcomplex Zoudenbalch

4 December 2022 Friendly	Kortrijk (Belgium)	1–0	(Netherlands) Excelsior	Burgh-Haamstede, Netherlands
12:00 CET (UTC+1)	Mehssatou 72'

10 December 2022 Friendly	Club Brugge (Belgium)	0–2	(Netherlands) Excelsior	Knokke-Heist, Netherlands
13:00 CET (UTC+1)		Report	Markelo 45'; Agrafiotis 82'	Stadium: Complex Molenhoek

15 December 2022 Friendly	Portimonense (Portugal)	1–1	(Netherlands) Excelsior	Albufeira, Portugal
11:00 CET (UTC+1)	Anderson 85'	Report	Goudmijn 23'

22 December 2022 Friendly	Excelsior (Netherlands)	0–1	(Netherlands) Heerenveen	Netherlands
13:00 CET (UTC+1)			Ali 44'
Note: 45+30 minutes

22 December 2022 Friendly	Excelsior (Netherlands)	1–1	(Netherlands) Heerenveen	Netherlands
15:00 CET (UTC+1)	Markelo 60'		Van Amersfoort 24'
Note: Match was played in two 30-minute periods

30 December 2022 Friendly	Willem II (Netherlands)	3–1	(Netherlands) Excelsior	Netherlands
11:00 CET (UTC+1)		Report

== Competitions ==
=== Overall record ===
Competition	First match	Last match	Starting round	Final position	Record							
Competition	First match	Last match	Starting round	Final position	Pld	W	D	L	GF	GA	GD	Win %
Eredivisie	7 August 2022	28 May 2023	Matchday 1	15th	34	9	5	20	32	71	−39	26.47
KNVB Cup	19 October 2022	11 January 2023	First round	Second round	2	1	0	1	6	5	+1	50.00
Total					36	10	5	21	38	76	−38	27.78

Source: Soccerway

=== Eredivisie ===
==== League table ====
Pos	Team	Pld	W	D	L	GF	GA	GD	Pts	Qualification or relegation
13	Fortuna Sittard	34	10	6	18	39	62	−23	36	
14	Volendam	34	10	6	18	42	71	−29	36	
15	Excelsior	34	9	5	20	32	71	−39	32	
16	Emmen (R)	34	6	10	18	33	65	−32	28	Qualification to Relegation play-offs
17	Cambuur (R)	34	5	4	25	26	69	−43	19	Relegation to Eerste Divisie

Source: Eredivisie
Rules for classification: Season in progress: 1) Most points won; 2) Less points lost; 3) Goal difference; 4) Goals scored; 5) Alphabetical order; End of season: 1) Points; 2) Goal difference; 3) Goals scored; 4) Head-to-head points; 5) Head-to-head goal difference; 6) Head-to-head away goals scored; 7) Play-off if relevant for deciding champion, relegation or participating in a European league, otherwise by draw. 8) Penalty shoot-out (only after a play-off)
(R) Relegated

==== Results summary ====
Overall								Home						Away					
Pld	W	D	L	GF	GA	GD	Pts	W	D	L	GF	GA	GD	W	D	L	GF	GA	GD
34	9	5	20	32	71	−39	32	8	2	7	22	26	−4	1	3	13	10	45	−35

Last updated: 28 May 2023.
Source: Eredivisie

==== Results by round ====
Round	1	2	3	4	5	6	7	8	9	10	11	12	13	14	15	16	17	18	19	20	21	22	23	24	25	26	27	28	29	30	31	32	33	34
Ground	A	H	H	A	A	H	A	H	A	A	H	A	H	A	H	A	H	A	H	H	A	H	A	H	A	H	H	A	H	A	H	A	H	A
Result	W	W	L	L	L	W	L	L	D	L	W	L	L	L	W	L	W	L	L	D	L	L	L	L	L	W	L	L	W	D	L	D	W	L
Position																																		15

Source: Eredivisie
A = Away; H = Home; W = Win; D = Draw; L = Loss

=== Matches ===
The league fixtures were announced on 17 June 2022.

==== 1st half ====
6 August 2022 1st week	SC Cambuur	0-2	Excelsior Rotterdam	Leeuwarden
18:45		Report	Marouan Azarkan 10'; Julian Baas 44'	Stadium: Kooi Stadion; Attendance: 9,671; Referee: Edwin van de Graaf

12 August 2022 2nd week	Excelsior Rotterdam	3-1	SBV Vitesse	Rotterdam
20:00	Reda Kharchouch 14' 20'; Kenzo Goudmijn 76'	Report	Nikolai Baden Frederiksen 29'	Stadium: Van Donge & De Roo Stadion; Attendance: 4,234; Referee: Alex Bos

28 August 2022 3rd week	Excelsior Rotterdam	1-6	PSV Eindhoven	Rotterdam
14:30	Siebe Horemans 74'	Report	Joey Veerman 2'; Ibrahim Sangaré 29' 45'; Xavi Simons 55' 84'; Cody Gakpo 59'	Stadium: Van Donge & De Roo Stadion; Attendance: 4,400; Referee: Jeroen Manschot

31 August 2022 4th week	FC Twente	4-0	Excelsior Rotterdam	Enschede
21:00	Denilho Cleonise 1'; Christos Tzolis 8'; Václav Cerný 62' 90+3'	Report		Stadium: De Grolsch Veste; Attendance: 27,000; Referee: Marc Nagtegaal

4 September 2022 5th week	RKC Waalwijk	4-0	Excelsior Rotterdam	Waalwijk
12:15	Shawn Adewoye 38'; Pelle Clement 50'; Thierry Lutonda 60'; Vurnon Anita 80'; Michiel Kramer 90+1'	Report	Julian Baas 15'; Redouan El Yaakoubi 43'	Stadium: Mandemakers Stadion; Attendance: 4,332; Referee: Jannick van der Laan

10 September 2022 6th week	Excelsior Rotterdam	2-1	FC Emmen	Rotterdam
21:00	Nathan Tjoe-A-On 61'; Serano Seymor 90+5'	Report	Ole Romeny 45'	Stadium: Van Donge & De Roo Stadion; Attendance: 4,034; Referee: Laurens Gerrets

17 September 2022 7th week	Fortuna Sittard	1-0	Excelsior Rotterdam	Sittard
21:00	Rémy Vita 87'	Report		Stadium: Fortuna Sittard Stadion; Attendance: 8,379; Referee: Edwin van de Graaf

2 October 2022 8th week	Excelsior Rotterdam	0-1	FC Utrecht	Rotterdam
14:30		Report	Sander van de Streek 31'	Stadium: Van Donge & De Roo Stadion; Attendance: 4,142; Referee: Richard Martens

8 October 2022 9th week	NEC Nijmegen	1-1	Excelsior Rotterdam	Goffertstadion
21:00	Landry Dimata 59'	Report	Lazaros Lamprou 88'	Stadium: Fortuna Sittard Stadion; Attendance: 12,100; Referee: Sander van der Eijk

16 October 2022 10th week	AFC Ajax	7-1	Excelsior Rotterdam	Amsterdam
20:00	Jorge Sánchez 15'; Steven Berghuis 26'; Brian Brobbey 44' 59'; Dusan Tadic 64'; Steven Bergwijn 75'; Mohammed Kudus 81'	Report	Nikolas Agrafiotis 90'	Stadium: Johan Cruijff Arena; Attendance: 53,941; Referee: Marc Nagtegaal

23 October 2022 11th week	Excelsior Rotterdam	2-1	AZ Alkmaar	Rotterdam
12:15	Siebe Horemans 6'; Marouan Azarkan 32'	Report	Yukinari Sugawara 48'	Stadium: Van Donge & De Roo Stadion; Attendance: 4,400; Referee: Allard Lindhout

29 October 2022 12th week	Go Ahead Eagles	3-1	Excelsior Rotterdam	Deventer
21:00	Willum Þór Willumsson 39'; Bobby Adekanye 41'; Isac Lidberg 60'	Report	Lazaros Lamprou 72'	Stadium: De Adelaarshorst; Attendance: 9,238; Referee: Jochem Kamphuis

5 November 2022 13th week	Excelsior Rotterdam	0-1	SC Heerenveen	Rotterdam
21:00		Report	Milan van Ewijk 58'	Stadium: Van Donge & De Roo Stadion; Attendance: 4,400; Referee: Robin Hensgens

13 November 2022 14th week	Feyenoord	5-1	Excelsior Rotterdam	Rotterdam
16:45	Sebastian Szymański 11' 50'; Orkun Kökçü 20' 66'; Patrik Wålemark 78'	Report	Kenzo Goudmijn 4'	Stadium: De Kuip; Attendance: 47,500; Referee: Joey Kooij

==== 2nd half ====
8 January 2023 15th week	Excelsior Rotterdam	1-0	FC Groningen	Rotterdam
16:45	Redouan El Yaakoubi 69'	Report		Stadium: Van Donge & De Roo Stadion; Attendance: 4,400; Referee: Erwin Blank

14 January 2023 16th week	Sparta Rotterdam	1-0	Excelsior Rotterdam	Rotterdam
21:00	Joshua Kitolano 90+1'	Report		Stadium: De Kuip; Attendance: 10,555; Referee: Edwin van de Graaf

20 January 2023 17th week	Excelsior Rotterdam	2-0	FC Volendam	Rotterdam
20:00	Damon Mirani 18' (o.g.); Marouan Azarkan 80'	Report		Stadium: Van Donge & De Roo Stadion; Attendance: 4,400; Referee: Danny Makkelie

25 January 2023 18th week	FC Utrecht	1-0	Excelsior Rotterdam	Rotterdam
21:00	Anastasios Douvikas 6'	Report		Stadium: Stadion Galgenwaard; Attendance: 17,058; Referee: Laurens Gerrets

29 January 2023 19th week	Excelsior Rotterdam	1-4	AFC Ajax	Rotterdam
14:30	Redouan El Yaakoubi 36'	Report	Dusan Tadic 15' (pen.); Davy Klaassen 45'; Mohammed Kudus 61'; Devyne Rensch 83'	Stadium: Van Donge & De Roo Stadion; Attendance: 4,400; Referee: Ingmar Oostrom

4 February 2023 20th week	Excelsior Rotterdam	0-0	RKC Waalwijk	Rotterdam
21:00		Report		Stadium: Van Donge & De Roo Stadion; Attendance: 4,400; Referee: Marc Nagtegaal

10 February 2023 21st week	FC Utrecht	5-0	Excelsior Rotterdam	Alkmaar
20:00	Sven Mijnans 20' 30'; Jesper Karlsson 27'; Jens Odgaard 35'; Vangelis Pavlidis 38'	Report		Stadium: AFAS Stadion; Attendance: 16,187; Referee: Alex Bos

19 February 2023 22nd week	Excelsior Rotterdam	0-3	NEC Nijmegen	Rotterdam
20:00		Report	Magnus Mattsson 44'; Souffian El Karouani 73'; Anthony Musaba 85'	Stadium: Van Donge & De Roo Stadion; Attendance: 4,000; Referee: Martin van den Kerkhof

25 February 2023 23rd week	FC Groningen	3-0	Excelsior Rotterdam	Groningen
16:30	Johan Hove 13'; Ricardo Pepi 50'; Liam van Gelderen 66'	Report		Stadium: Euroborg; Attendance: 20,140; Referee: Danny Makkelie

5 March 2023 24th week	Excelsior Rotterdam	1-4	Sparta Rotterdam	Rotterdam
12:15	Couhaib Driouech 45'	Report	Redouan El Yaakoubi 20' (o.g.); Kōki Saitō 49'; Tobias Lauritsen 56'; Bart Vriends 60'	Stadium: Van Donge & De Roo Stadion; Attendance: 4,000; Referee: Bas Nijhuis

11 March 2023 25th week	FC Emmen	2-0	Excelsior Rotterdam	Groningen
16:30	Ole Romeny 63' 71'	Report		Stadium: De Oude Meerdijk; Attendance: 8,126; Referee: Dennis Higler

19 March 2023 26th week	Excelsior Rotterdam	4-1	SC Cambuur	Rotterdam
14:30	Kenzo Goudmijn 6'; Léon Bergsma 10' (o.g.); Siebe Horemans 20'; Lazaros Lamprou 33'	Report	Alex Bangura 50'	Stadium: Van Donge & De Roo Stadion; Attendance: 4,100; Referee: Jeroen Manschot

1 April 2023 27th week	Excelsior Rotterdam	0-0	FC Twente	Rotterdam
18:45		Report		Stadium: Van Donge & De Roo Stadion; Attendance: 4,400; Referee: Martin Fernando Perezlindo

8 April 2023 28th week	PSV Eindhoven	4-0	Excelsior Rotterdam	Eindhoven
20:00	Luuk de Jong 12'; Xavi Simons 78'; Fábio Silva 82'; Érick Gutiérrez 87'	Report		Stadium: Philips Stadion; Attendance: 36,003; Referee: Rob Dieperink

14 April 2023 29th week	Excelsior Rotterdam	2-1	Go Ahead Eagles	Rotterdam
20:00	Couhaib Driouech 54'; Julian Baas 65'	Report	Willum Þór Willumsson 61'	Stadium: Van Donge & De Roo Stadion; Attendance: 4,400; Referee: Erwin Blank

22 April 2023 30th week	SBV Vitesse	0-0	Excelsior Rotterdam	Arnhem
21:00		Report		Stadium: Gelredome; Attendance: 15,007; Referee: Sander van der Eijk

7 May 2023 31st week	Excelsior Rotterdam	0-2	Feyenoord	Rotterdam
14:30		Report	Santiago Gimenez 9' 75'	Stadium: Van Donge & De Roo Stadion; Attendance: 4,400; Referee: Serdar Gözübüyük

13 May 2023 32nd week	SC Heerenveen	0-0	Excelsior Rotterdam	Heerenveen
20:00		Report		Stadium: Abe Lenstra Stadion; Attendance: 18,912; Referee: Rob Dieperink

21 May 2023 33rd week	Excelsior Rotterdam	3-0	Fortuna Sittard	Rotterdam
14:30	Kik Pierie 59'; Couhaib Driouech 73'; Kenzo Goudmijn 85'	Report		Stadium: Van Donge & De Roo Stadion; Attendance: 4,400; Referee: Martin van den Kerkhof

28 May 2023 34th week	FC Volendam	3-2	Excelsior Rotterdam	Volendam
14:30	Daryl van Mieghem 10'; Stijn van Gassel 23' (o.g.); Francesco Antonucci 27'	Report	Lazaros Lamprou 56'; Nikolas Agrafiotis 78'	Stadium: Kras Stadion; Attendance: 6,733; Referee: Jochem Kamphuis

=== KNVB Cup ===
19 October 2022 1st round	Excelsior Rotterdam	5-1	MVV Maastricht	Rotterdam
20:00	Reda Kharchouch 22' (pen.) 53' (pen.); Lazaros Lamprou 39' 44'; Marouan Azarkan 49'	Report	Koen Kostons 65'	Stadium: Van Donge & De Roo Stadion; Attendance: 2,000; Referee: Jeroen Manschot

11 January 2023 2nd round	Excelsior Rotterdam	1-4	AZ Alkmaar	Rotterdam
18:45	Reda Kharchouch 32'	Report	Jens Odgaard 13'; Dani de Wit 35'; Jesper Karlsson 39'; Vangelis Pavlidis 79'	Stadium: Van Donge & De Roo Stadion; Attendance: 4,300; Referee: Bas Nijhuis

== Player statistics ==
=== Appearances and goals ===
No.	Pos	Nat	Player	Total		Eredivisie		KNVB Cup	
No.	Pos	Nat	Player	Apps	Goals	Apps	Goals	Apps	Goals
1	GK	(Netherlands) NED	Stijn van Gassel	34	0	34	0	0	0
2	DF	(Belgium) BEL	Siebe Horemans	36	3	34	3	2	0
3	DF	(Netherlands) NED	Kik Pierie	7	1	7	1	0	0
4	DF	(Netherlands) NED	Redouan El Yaakoubi	34	3	33	3	1	0
5	MF	(Germany) GER	Adrian Fein	15	0	14	0	1	0
6	MF	(Netherlands) NED	Joshua Eijgenraam	15	0	13	0	2	0
7	FW	(Netherlands) NED	Nikolas Agrafiotis	19	2	17	2	2	0
8	MF	(Netherlands) NED	Kenzo Goudmijn	36	4	34	4	2	0
9	FW	(Netherlands) NED	Reda Kharchouch	31	5	29	2	2	3
10	FW	(Netherlands) NED	Marouan Azarkan	29	5	27	3	2	2
11	MF	(Belgium) BEL	Jacky Donkor	7	0	6	0	1	0
12	DF	(France) FRA	Arthur Zagre	9	0	9	0	0	0
14	FW	(Belgium) BEL	Couhaib Driouech	35	3	33	3	2	0
15	MF	(Netherlands) NED	Noah Naujoks	10	0	10	0	0	0
16	DF	(Netherlands) NED	Sven Nieuwpoort	23	0	23	0	0	0
17	DF	(Germany) GER	Maxime Awoudja	12	0	10	0	2	0
17	FW	(Netherlands) NED	Luuk Admiraal	1	0	1	0	0	0
18	GK	(Netherlands) NED	Norbert Alblas	3	0	1	0	2	0
19	FW	(Netherlands) NED	Raphaël Eyongo	5	0	5	0	0	0
21	MF	(Morocco) MAR	Yassine Ayoub	15	0	15	0	0	0
22	FW	(Greece) GRE	Lazaros Lamprou	30	6	28	4	2	2
23	MF	(Netherlands) NED	Peer Koopmeiners	20	0	19	0	1	0
27	FW	(Netherlands) NED	Vicente Besuijen	2	0	2	0	0	0
28	DF	(India) IND	Nathan Tjoe-A-On	30	1	29	1	1	0
29	FW	(Netherlands) NED	Mike van Duinen	30	0	28	0	2	0
33	MF	(Netherlands) NED	Julian Baas	35	3	33	3	2	0
34	DF	(Netherlands) NED	Serano Seymor	23	1	21	1	2	0
37	MF	(Curaçao) CUW	Nathangelo Markelo	16	0	14	0	2	0

=== Clean sheets ===
#	Player	Eredivisie
1	(Netherlands) Stijn van Gassel	6

=== Disciplinary record ===
#	Player	Eredivisie		KNVB Cup		Total	
#	Player	Yellow card	Red card	Yellow card	Red card	Yellow card	Red card
1	(Netherlands) Redouan El Yaakoubi	3	1	0	0	3	1
2	(Morocco) Couhaib Driouech	5	0	0	0	5	0
3	(Netherlands) Julian Baas	4	0	0	0	4	0
3	(Netherlands) Marouan Azarkan	4	0	0	0	4	0
3	(Netherlands) Mike van Duinen	4	0	0	0	4	0
3	(Belgium) Siebe Horemans	4	0	0	0	4	0
7	(Netherlands) Reda Kharchouch	3	0	0	0	3	0
7	(Morocco) Yassine Ayoub	3	0	0	0	3	0
9	(Germany) Adrian Fein	2	0	0	0	2	0
9	(Netherlands) Joshua Eijgenraam	2	0	0	0	2	0
9	(Netherlands) Kenzo Goudmijn	2	0	0	0	2	0
9	(Curaçao) Nathangelo Markelo	2	0	0	0	2	0
9	(Netherlands) Nikolas Agrafiotis	2	0	0	0	2	0
14	(France) Arthur Zagre	1	0	0	0	1	0
14	(Belgium) Jacky Donkor	1	0	0	0	1	0
14	(Greece) Lazaros Lamprou	1	0	0	0	1	0
14	(Germany) Maxime Awoudja	0	0	1	0	1	0
14	(Netherlands) Noah Naujoks	1	0	0	0	1	0
14	(Netherlands) Peer Koopmeiners	1	0	0	0	1	0
14	(Netherlands) Serano Seymor	1	0	0	0	1	0
14	(Netherlands) Sven Nieuwpoort	1	0	0	0	1	0
