= 2021–22 Eredivisie =

66th season of the Eredivisie

Eredivisie
- Season: 2021–22
- Dates: 13 August 2021 – 15 May 2022
- Champions: Ajax (36th title)
- Relegated: Heracles Almelo; Willem II; PEC Zwolle
- Champions League: Ajax; PSV Eindhoven
- Europa League: Feyenoord
- Europa Conference League: Twente; AZ
- Matches: 306
- Goals: 875 (2.86 per match)
- Top goalscorer: Sébastien Haller (21 goals)
- Biggest home win: Ajax 9–0 Cambuur (18 September 2021)
- Biggest away win: Fortuna Sittard 0–5 Ajax (21 September 2021); RKC Waalwijk 0–5 Ajax (21 November 2021); Cambuur 1–6 Vitesse (4 December 2021); Vitesse 0–5 PSV (12 February 2022)
- Highest scoring: Ajax 9–0 Cambuur (18 September 2021)
- Longest winning run: 7 matches Ajax
- Longest unbeaten run: 14 matches AZ
- Longest winless run: 13 matches Willem II
- Longest losing run: 10 matches Willem II

The 2021–22 Eredivisie was the 66th season of Eredivisie, the premier football competition in the Netherlands. It began on 14 August 2021 and concluded on 15 May 2022.

Ajax became the champions in round 33, beating Heerenveen 5–0 in their own Johan Cruyff Arena in Amsterdam on 11 May 2022.

== Teams ==
Cambuur (promoted after a five-year absence), Go Ahead Eagles and NEC (both promoted after a four-year absence) were promoted from the 2020–21 Eerste Divisie. ADO Den Haag (relegated after thirteen years in the top flight), VVV-Venlo (relegated after four years in the top flight) and Emmen (relegated after three years in the top flight) have been relegated to 2021–22 Eerste Divisie.

Locations of the 2021–22 Eredivisie teams
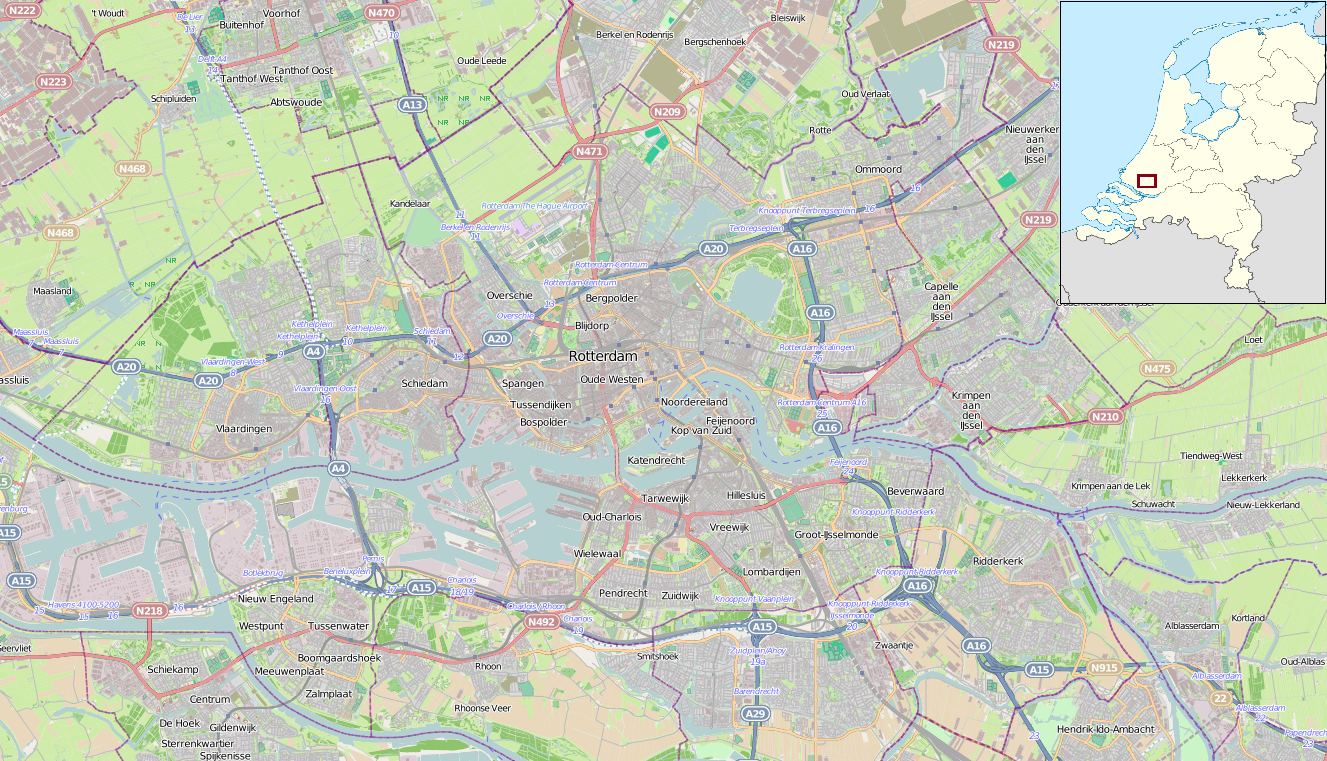
Rotterdam Eredivisie football clubs

=== Stadiums and locations ===
Club	Location	Venue	Capacity	2020–21 position
Ajax	Amsterdam	Johan Cruyff Arena	55,500	1st
AZ	Alkmaar	AFAS Stadion	19,478	3rd
Cambuur	Leeuwarden	Cambuur Stadion	10,500	1D, 1st
Feyenoord	Rotterdam	De Kuip	47,500	5th
Fortuna Sittard	Sittard	Fortuna Sittard Stadion	10,300	11th
Go Ahead Eagles	Deventer	De Adelaarshorst	10,000	1D, 2nd
Groningen	Groningen	Euroborg	22,550	7th
Heerenveen	Heerenveen	Abe Lenstra Stadion	27,224	12th
Heracles Almelo	Almelo	Erve Asito	12,080	9th
NEC	Nijmegen	Goffertstadion	12,500	PO, W
PEC Zwolle	Zwolle	MAC³PARK stadion	14,000	13th
PSV	Eindhoven	Philips Stadion	36,500	2nd
RKC Waalwijk	Waalwijk	Mandemakers Stadion	7,500	15th
Sparta Rotterdam	Rotterdam	Spartastadion Het Kasteel	11,000	8th
Twente	Enschede	De Grolsch Veste	30,205	10th
Utrecht	Utrecht	Stadion Galgenwaard	23,750	6th
Vitesse	Arnhem	GelreDome	21,248	4th
Willem II	Tilburg	Koning Willem II Stadion	14,500	14th

=== Number of teams by province ===
Number of teams	Province	Team(s)
4	Overijssel	Go Ahead Eagles, Heracles Almelo, PEC Zwolle, Twente
3	North Brabant	PSV, RKC Waalwijk, Willem II
2	Friesland	Cambuur, Heerenveen
2	Gelderland	NEC, Vitesse
2	North Holland	Ajax, AZ
2	South Holland	Feyenoord, Sparta Rotterdam
1	Groningen	Groningen
1	Limburg	Fortuna Sittard
1	Utrecht	Utrecht

=== Personnel and kits ===
Note: Flags indicate national team as has been defined under FIFA eligibility rules. Players and managers may hold more than one non-FIFA nationality.

Team	Manager	Captain	Kit manufacturer	Main Sponsor
Ajax	(Netherlands) Erik ten Hag	(Serbia) Dušan Tadić	Adidas	Ziggo
AZ	(Netherlands) Pascal Jansen	(Netherlands) Owen Wijndal	Nike	AFAS Software
Cambuur	(Netherlands) Dennis Haar (interim)	(Netherlands) Erik Schouten	Craft	Bouwgroep Dijkstra Draisma
Feyenoord	(Netherlands) Arne Slot	(Netherlands) Jens Toornstra	Adidas	EuroParcs
Fortuna Sittard	(Netherlands) Sjors Ultee	(Netherlands) Ben Rienstra	Masita	Hurkmans Groep
Go Ahead Eagles	(Netherlands) Kees van Wonderen	(Netherlands) Bas Kuipers	Stanno	Jumper De diersuper
Groningen	(Netherlands) Danny Buijs	(Morocco) Mo El Hankouri	Robey	Office Centre
Heerenveen	(Denmark) Ole Tobiasen (interim)	(Netherlands) Erwin Mulder	Jako	Ausnutria
Heracles Almelo	(Germany) Frank Wormuth	(Germany) Janis Blaswich	Acerbis	Asito
NEC Nijmegen	(Netherlands) Rogier Meijer	(Netherlands) Rens van Eijden	Legea	KlokGroep
PEC Zwolle	(Netherlands) Dick Schreuder	(Netherlands) Bram van Polen	Craft	VDK Groep
PSV	(Germany) Roger Schmidt	(Netherlands) Marco van Ginkel	Puma	Metropoolregio Brainport Eindhoven
RKC Waalwijk	(Netherlands) Joseph Oosting	(Netherlands) Melle Meulensteen	Stanno	Willy Naessens
Sparta Rotterdam	(Netherlands) Maurice Steijn	(Morocco) Adil Auassar	Robey	D&S Groep
Twente	(Netherlands) Ron Jans	(Netherlands) Wout Brama	Meyba	Pure Energie
Utrecht	(Netherlands) Rick Kruys (interim)	(Netherlands) Willem Janssen	Nike	T-Mobile
Vitesse	(Germany) Thomas Letsch	(Netherlands) Danilho Doekhi	Nike	eToro
Willem II	(Netherlands) Kevin Hofland	(Spain) Pol Llonch	Robey	DESTIL

=== Managerial changes ===
Team	Outgoing manager	Manner of departure	Date of vacancy	Position in table	Replaced by	Date of appointment	Ref.
Feyenoord	(Netherlands) Dick Advocaat	End of contract	30 June 2021	Pre season	(Netherlands) Arne Slot	1 July 2021	
PEC Zwolle	(Netherlands) Bert Konterman	End of interim spell	30 June 2021	Pre season	(Netherlands) Art Langeler	1 July 2021	
Willem II	(Montenegro) Željko Petrović	End of contract	30 June 2021	Pre season	(Netherlands) Fred Grim	1 July 2021	
RKC Waalwijk	(Netherlands) Fred Grim	Signed by Willem II	30 June 2021	Pre season	(Netherlands) Joseph Oosting	1 July 2021	
PEC Zwolle	(Netherlands) Art Langeler	Resigned	16 November 2021	18th	(Netherlands) Dick Schreuder	18 November 2021	
Heerenveen	(Netherlands) Johnny Jansen	Sacked	24 January 2022	10th	(Denmark) Ole Tobiasen (interim)	27 January 2022	
Willem II	(Netherlands) Fred Grim	Sacked	8 March 2022	15th	(Netherlands) Denny Landzaat (interim)	8 March 2022	
Willem II	(Netherlands) Denny Landzaat	End of interim spell	14 March 2022	16th	(Netherlands) Kevin Hofland	14 March 2022	
Utrecht	(Netherlands) René Hake	Sacked	22 March 2022	7th	(Netherlands) Rick Kruys (interim)	22 March 2022	
Cambuur	(Netherlands) Henk de Jong	Illness replacement	29 March 2022	9th	(Netherlands) Dennis Haar (interim)	30 March 2022	
Sparta Rotterdam	(Netherlands) Henk Fraser	Resigned	24 April 2022	18th	(Netherlands) Maurice Steijn	26 April 2022	
Heracles Almelo	(Germany) Frank Wormuth	Sacked	16 May 2022	16th	(Netherlands) René Kolmschot (interim)	16 May 2022	

== Standings ==
=== League table ===
Pos	Team	Pld	W	D	L	GF	GA	GD	Pts	Qualification or relegation
1	Ajax (C)	34	26	5	3	98	19	+79	83	Qualification for the Champions League group stage
2	PSV Eindhoven	34	26	3	5	86	42	+44	81	Qualification for the Champions League third qualifying round
3	Feyenoord	34	22	5	7	76	34	+42	71	Qualification for the Europa League group stage (Note: Since the winners of the 2021–22 KNVB Cup, PSV, qualified for the Champions League based on their league position, the Europa League play-off berth awarded to the KNVB Cup winners was transferred to the third-placed team Feyenoord, the highest-placed team not qualified for the Champions League. Feyenoord qualified for the Europa League group stage as their opponent in the 2022 UEFA Europa Conference League final, Roma, qualified to the Europa League group stage through domestic performance by finishing sixth in the Serie A.)
4	Twente	34	20	8	6	55	37	+18	68	Qualification for the Europa Conference League third qualifying round
5	AZ (O)	34	18	7	9	64	44	+20	61	Qualification for the European competition play-offs
6	Vitesse	34	15	6	13	42	51	−9	51	Qualification for the European competition play-offs
7	Utrecht	34	12	11	11	51	46	+5	47	Qualification for the European competition play-offs
8	Heerenveen	34	11	8	15	37	50	−13	41	Qualification for the European competition play-offs
9	Cambuur	34	11	6	17	53	70	−17	39	
10	RKC Waalwijk	34	9	11	14	40	51	−11	38	
11	NEC	34	10	8	16	38	52	−14	38	
12	Groningen	34	9	9	16	41	55	−14	36	
13	Go Ahead Eagles	34	10	6	18	37	51	−14	36	
14	Sparta Rotterdam	34	8	11	15	30	48	−18	35	
15	Fortuna Sittard	34	10	5	19	36	67	−31	35	
16	Heracles Almelo (R)	34	9	7	18	33	49	−16	34	Qualification for the Relegation play-offs
17	Willem II (R)	34	9	6	19	32	57	−25	33	Relegation to Eerste Divisie
18	PEC Zwolle (R)	34	7	6	21	26	52	−26	27	Relegation to Eerste Divisie

Source: Eredivisie
Rules for classification: Season in progress: 1) Most points won; 2) Less points lost; 3) Goal difference; 4) Goals scored; 5) Alphabetical order; End of season: 1) Points; 2) Goal difference; 3) Goals scored; 4) Head-to-head points; 5) Head-to-head goal difference; 6) Head-to-head away goals scored; 7) Play-off if relevant for deciding champion, relegation or participating in a European league, otherwise by draw. 8) Penalty shoot-out (only after a play-off)
(C) Champions; (O) Play-off winners; (R) Relegated

== Results ==
=== Fixtures and results ===
Home \ Away	AJA	AZ	CAM	FEY	FOR	GAE	GRO	HEE	HER	NEC	PEC	PSV	RKC	SPA	TWE	UTR	VIT	WIL
Ajax		1–2	9–0	3–2	5–0	0–0	3–0	5–0	3–0	5–0	3–0	5–0	3–2	2–1	5–0	0–1	5–0	5–0
AZ	2–2		0–0	2–1	2–1	5–0	1–0	2–1	2–1	1–1	3–2	0–3	1–3	3–1	0–1	5–1	3–1	4–1
Cambuur	2–3	1–3		2–3	2–1	5–2	1–2	1–2	2–1	1–2	3–4	1–2	1–1	1–1	2–0	2–1	1–6	1–1
Feyenoord	0–2	1–0	3–1		5–0	2–0	1–1	3–1	2–1	5–3	4–0	2–2	2–2	4–0	1–2	2–1	0–1	2–0
Fortuna Sittard	0–5	1–2	1–0	1–3		1–0	1–4	2–0	0–2	1–3	0–1	1–4	2–2	3–0	2–1	2–2	1–2	1–0
Go Ahead Eagles	2–1	1–4	3–0	0–1	4–3		0–1	0–1	4–2	0–2	1–0	1–2	0–2	2–0	1–2	1–1	1–2	4–0
Groningen	1–3	2–0	2–3	1–1	0–1	2–1		1–1	0–1	4–3	1–1	0–1	1–1	1–2	1–1	0–0	0–1	1–0
Heerenveen	0–2	1–3	3–3	0–3	1–0	3–1	3–1		2–0	0–1	0–1	1–1	3–2	0–0	2–3	1–2	1–2	2–1
Heracles Almelo	0–0	3–2	1–1	1–4	3–1	1–1	4–2	0–1		0–1	2–0	0–2	1–0	1–3	1–1	1–0	0–0	3–2
NEC	0–1	1–3	2–3	1–4	0–1	1–0	3–0	1–1	0–0		2–0	1–2	1–1	0–0	0–2	0–3	0–1	0–0
PEC Zwolle	0–2	2–1	1–2	1–2	0–1	0–1	1–1	0–1	1–0	1–1		1–2	0–0	1–1	1–3	1–1	0–1	2–0
PSV	1–2	1–2	4–1	0–4	5–0	2–0	5–2	3–1	3–1	3–2	3–1		2–0	2–1	5–2	4–1	2–0	4–2
RKC Waalwijk	0–5	1–0	0–1	0–2	2–1	1–1	3–1	0–0	2–0	2–1	0–2	1–4		1–0	1–2	1–1	1–2	1–2
Sparta Rotterdam	0–1	1–1	0–4	0–1	3–1	1–0	1–1	1–1	1–1	1–1	2–0	1–2	1–1		0–1	0–3	2–2	1–0
Twente	1–1	3–1	1–0	0–0	1–2	2–2	3–0	2–0	1–0	1–2	1–0	3–3	2–1	2–0		1–0	3–0	1–1
Utrecht	0–3	2–2	3–2	3–1	1–1	0–0	1–3	2–1	1–0	1–0	5–1	0–1	2–2	4–0	1–1		1–1	5–1
Vitesse	2–2	0–0	1–0	2–1	1–1	1–2	1–3	1–2	2–1	4–1	1–0	0–5	1–2	0–1	1–4	2–1		0–3
Willem II	0–1	2–2	1–3	0–4	1–1	0–1	2–1	0–0	2–0	0–1	1–0	2–1	3–1	0–3	0–1	3–0	1–0	

Source: Eredivisie, Flashscore
Legend: Blue = home team win; Yellow = draw; Red = away team win.
For upcoming matches, an "a" indicates there is an article about the rivalry between the two participants.

=== Results by round ===
Team ╲ Round	1	2	3	4	5	6	7	8	9	10	11	12	13	14	15	16	17	18	19	20	21	22	23	24	25	26	27	28	29	30	31	32	33	34
Ajax	W	D	W	W	W	W	W	L	W	W	D	D	W	W	W	L	W	W	W	W	W	W	W	L	W	W	W	W	W	W	W	D	W	D
AZ	L	W	W	L	L	L	W	W	W	L	W	L	D	D	W	W	W	W	W	D	W	W	W	W	W	L	D	W	L	W	D	D	D	L
Cambuur	L	L	W	W	L	W	W	L	L	L	W	W	W	W	L	W	L	D	D	D	L	L	L	W	L	L	L	L	L	L	D	D	D	W
Feyenoord	W	W	L	W	W	W	W	L	D	W	W	W	W	D	W	D	L	W	L	W	W	W	W	L	D	W	L	W	W	W	W	D	W	L
Fortuna Sittard	W	L	D	L	L	L	D	L	W	D	L	L	L	L	L	W	D	L	L	L	W	W	W	L	L	W	L	L	D	W	L	W	L	W
Go Ahead Eagles	L	L	W	L	W	L	L	D	W	W	W	D	L	W	L	D	L	L	L	D	L	L	D	W	D	L	W	W	W	L	L	L	L	L
Groningen	W	D	L	D	L	L	L	D	D	W	L	D	W	W	D	D	L	L	L	W	W	L	D	W	D	W	W	L	L	L	L	L	L	L
Heerenveen	W	W	L	D	W	L	L	W	L	L	L	D	W	D	W	D	W	L	L	L	L	L	L	L	D	D	W	D	W	L	D	W	L	W
Heracles Almelo	L	D	L	L	W	L	W	W	L	L	D	L	W	L	L	L	W	D	D	D	L	W	L	W	L	D	L	W	L	W	D	L	L	L
NEC	L	W	W	D	D	L	L	W	L	W	W	D	D	L	L	L	W	W	D	L	D	W	D	L	L	L	D	W	L	L	L	W	L	L
PEC Zwolle	L	L	L	L	L	D	L	L	L	W	L	L	L	D	D	L	L	L	W	W	D	W	D	L	W	L	L	L	W	W	L	D	L	L
PSV	W	W	W	W	L	W	L	W	W	L	W	W	W	D	W	W	W	W	W	L	L	W	W	W	W	W	W	D	W	W	W	D	W	W
RKC Waalwijk	W	L	D	L	D	L	L	D	D	W	L	D	L	D	W	L	L	D	W	W	L	L	D	L	L	D	W	D	L	L	W	D	W	W
Sparta Rotterdam	L	D	L	W	D	D	L	L	D	L	L	W	L	L	L	D	D	D	D	L	L	W	L	L	W	W	D	D	L	L	D	W	W	W
Twente	L	D	L	W	W	W	W	D	D	L	L	W	W	D	W	W	W	D	W	W	W	L	D	W	W	W	W	D	W	W	D	L	W	W
Utrecht	W	D	W	L	D	W	W	W	L	W	W	L	L	W	L	D	D	D	L	W	W	L	D	W	D	L	L	D	D	L	W	D	D	L
Vitesse	W	L	L	W	L	W	D	W	W	L	W	W	L	D	W	W	D	W	W	L	L	L	D	W	L	D	L	L	W	L	W	L	W	D
Willem II	L	W	W	D	W	W	W	L	D	D	L	L	L	L	L	L	L	L	L	L	W	L	L	L	D	L	D	L	L	W	L	W	D	W

Source: worldfootball.net

== European play-offs ==
The European play-offs were contested by the four highest ranked teams which were not yet qualified for any European tournament. The matches were played on a home-and-away basis, from 18 to 29 May. The winner received a spot in the second qualifying round of the 2022–23 UEFA Europa Conference League.

=== Qualified teams ===
Team	Rank	Seed
AZ	5	1
Vitesse	6	2
Utrecht	7	3
Heerenveen	8	4

=== Bracket ===
Semi-finals
1	AZ	2	2	4
4	Heerenveen	3	0	3
2	Vitesse (a.e.t.)	1	3	4
3	Utrecht	3	0	3

Final
1	AZ	1	6	7
2	Vitesse	2	1	3

=== Semi-finals ===
==== First legs ====
19 May 2022	Heerenveen	3–2	AZ	Heerenveen
18:45 CEST	Van Hooijdonk 58'; Sarr 90'; Halilović 90+5'	Report	Evjen 59'; Pavlidis 65'	Stadium: Abe Lenstra Stadion; Attendance: 15,765; Referee: Jeroen Manschot

19 May 2022	Utrecht	3–1	Vitesse	Utrecht
21:00 CEST	Janssen 3'; Van de Streek 21'; Gustafson 81' (pen.)	Report	Vroegh 85'	Stadium: Stadion Galgenwaard; Attendance: 17,524; Referee: Dennis Higler

==== Second legs ====
22 May 2022	AZ	2–0 (4–3 agg.)	Heerenveen	Alkmaar
14:30 CEST	De Wit 5'; Aboukhlal 88'	Report		Stadium: AFAS Stadion; Attendance: 11,521; Referee: Danny Makkelie

22 May 2022	Vitesse	3–0 (a.e.t.) (4–3 agg.)	Utrecht	Arnhem
18:00 CEST	Manhoef 39'; Tronstad 52'; Baden Frederiksen 93'	Report		Stadium: GelreDome; Attendance: 13,675; Referee: Allard Lindhout

=== Final ===
==== First leg ====
26 May 2022	Vitesse	2–1	AZ	Arnhem
20:00 CEST	Buitink 22'; Openda 86'	Report	Clasie 59'	Stadium: GelreDome; Attendance: 17,547; Referee: Pol van Boekel

==== Second leg ====
29 May 2022	AZ	6–1 (7–3 agg.)	Vitesse	Alkmaar
14:30 CEST	Pavlidis 3'; Reijnders 13', 52'; De Wit 41'; Karlsson 75', 89'	Report	Bazoer 78'	Stadium: AFAS Stadion; Attendance: 15,222; Referee: Bas Nijhuis

== Promotion/relegation play-offs ==
The seeds were assigned based on the final ranking after the regular season. The best ranked team got the highest seed (lowest number). Eredivisie teams were considered to be better ranked than Eerste Divisie teams.

If a match was level at the end of normal playing time, extra time was played (two periods of fifteen minutes each) and followed, if necessary, by a penalty shoot-out to determine the winners.

Seven teams, six from the Eerste Divisie and one from the Eredivisie, played for a spot in the 2022–23 Eredivisie. The remaining six teams played in the 2022–23 Eerste Divisie. The highest seeded team or the team from the Eredivisie always host the second leg.

=== Qualified teams ===
Team	Rank	Seed
Heracles Almelo	16	1
FC Eindhoven	3	2
ADO Den Haag	4	3
Roda JC Kerkrade	5	4
Excelsior	6	5
NAC Breda	8	6
De Graafschap	9	7

=== Bracket ===
First round
4	Roda JC Kerkrade	2	0	2
5	Excelsior (a.e.t.)	2	2	4
2	FC Eindhoven	1	3	4
7	De Graafschap	1	1	2
3	ADO Den Haag	2	2	4
6	NAC Breda	1	1	2

Semi-finals
5	Excelsior	3	3	6
1	Heracles Almelo	0	1	1
2	FC Eindhoven	1	1	2
3	ADO Den Haag	2	2	4

Final
5	Excelsior (p)	1	4	5 (8)
3	ADO Den Haag	1	4	5 (7)

=== First round ===
==== First legs ====
9 May 2022	De Graafschap	1–1	FC Eindhoven	Doetinchem
20:00 CEST	Gravenberch 73' (pen.)	Report	Sleegers 12' (pen.)	Stadium: De Vijverberg; Attendance: 10,022; Referee: Alex Bos

10 May 2022	NAC Breda	1–2	ADO Den Haag	Breda
18:45 CEST	Maria 74'	Report	Steijn 34'; Komljenovic 90+3'	Stadium: Rat Verlegh Stadion; Attendance: 16,728; Referee: Edwin van de Graaf

10 May 2022	Excelsior	2–2	Roda JC Kerkrade	Rotterdam
21:00 CEST	Goudmijn 9'; Dallinga 42' (pen.)	Report	Vente 67'; Marzo 68'	Stadium: Van Donge & De Roo Stadion; Attendance: 3,178; Referee: Rob Dieperink

==== Second legs ====
13 May 2022	FC Eindhoven	3–1 (4–2 agg.)	De Graafschap	Eindhoven
20:00 CEST	Ogenia 10'; Brym 22'; Sleegers 24'	Report	Kaandorp 16'	Stadium: Jan Louwers Stadion; Attendance: 4,200; Referee: Jannick van der Laan

14 May 2022	ADO Den Haag	2–1 (4–2 agg.)	NAC Breda	Den Haag
16:30 CEST	Malone 76' (o.g.); Klas 79'	Report	Banzuzi 90+3'	Stadium: Cars Jeans Stadion; Attendance: 10,379; Referee: Allard Lindhout

14 May 2022	Roda JC Kerkrade	0–2 (a.e.t.) (2–4 agg.)	Excelsior	Kerkrade
20:00 CEST		Report	Driouech 95'; Agrafiotis 120+3'	Stadium: Parkstad Limburg Stadion; Attendance: 14,763; Referee: Jochem Kamphuis

=== Semi-finals ===
==== First legs ====
17 May 2022	ADO Den Haag	2–1	FC Eindhoven	Den Haag
20:00 CEST	Klas 15'; Verheydt 28'	Report	Sleegers 74' (pen.)	Stadium: Cars Jeans Stadion; Attendance: 10,475; Referee: Jochem Kamphuis

18 May 2022	Excelsior	3–0	Heracles Almelo	Rotterdam
18:45 CEST	Azarkan 21'; Dallinga 74'; Driouech 85'	Report		Stadium: Van Donge & De Roo Stadion; Attendance: 4,400; Referee: Martin van den Kerkhof

==== Second legs ====
21 May 2022	FC Eindhoven	1–2 (2–4 agg.)	ADO Den Haag	Eindhoven
16:30 CEST	Amevor 89'	Report	Verheydt 16'; Seedorf 26' (o.g.)	Stadium: Jan Louwers Stadion; Attendance: 4,200; Referee: Bas Nijhuis

21 May 2022	Heracles Almelo	1–3 (1–6 agg.)	Excelsior	Almelo
20:00 CEST	Bakış 28'	Report	Dallinga 47'; Wieffer 63'; Agrafiotis 83'	Stadium: Erve Asito; Attendance: 6,924; Referee: Edwin van de Graaf

=== Final ===
==== First leg ====
24 May 2022	Excelsior	1–1	ADO Den Haag	Rotterdam
20:00 CEST	Azarkan 47'	Report	Steijn 90+2'	Stadium: Van Donge & De Roo Stadion; Attendance: 4,400; Referee: Dennis Higler

==== Second leg ====
29 May 2022	ADO Den Haag	4–4 (a.e.t.) (5–5 agg.) (7–8 p)	Excelsior	Den Haag
18:00 CEST	Verheydt 35'; Pires 40'; Steijn 47'; Komljenovic 97'	Report	Azarkan 79'; Niemeijer 83'; Dallinga 90+3'; El Yaakoubi 109'	Stadium: Cars Jeans Stadion; Attendance: 15,000; Referee: Danny Makkelie
	Penalties
	Kemper (penalty scored); Matthys (penalty scored); Klas (penalty missed); Asante (penalty scored); Komljenovic (penalty scored); Puclin (penalty scored); Ćatić (penalty scored); Esajas (penalty scored); Amofa (penalty missed)		(penalty scored) El Yaakoubi; (penalty scored) Baas; (penalty missed) Eyongo; (penalty scored) Nieuwpoort; (penalty scored) Driouech; (penalty scored) Ormonde-Ottewill; (penalty scored) Admiraal; (penalty scored) Wieffer; (penalty scored) Horemans

== Statistics ==
=== Top scorers ===
Rank	Player	Club	Goals
1	(Ivory Coast) Sébastien Haller	Ajax	21
2	(Belgium) Loïs Openda	Vitesse	18
3	(Greece) Vangelis Pavlidis	AZ	16
3	(Netherlands) Ricky van Wolfswinkel	Twente	16
5	(Sweden) Jesper Karlsson	AZ	15
5	(Netherlands) Guus Til	Feyenoord	15
7	(Norway) Jørgen Strand Larsen	Groningen	14
8	(Netherlands) Bryan Linssen	Feyenoord	13
8	(Serbia) Dušan Tadić	Ajax	13
10	(Netherlands) Zian Flemming	Fortuna Sittard	12
10	(Netherlands) Cody Gakpo	PSV Eindhoven	12
10	(Colombia) Luis Sinisterra	Feyenoord	12

=== Hat-tricks ===
Rnd	Player	Club	Goals	Date	Home	Score	Away
11	(Netherlands) Bart Ramselaar	Utrecht	10', 25', 67'	31 October 2021	Utrecht	5–1	Willem II
22	(Ivory Coast) Sébastien Haller	Ajax	53', 85', 88'	13 February 2022	Ajax	5–0	Twente

=== Top assists ===
Rank	Player	Club	Assists
1	(Serbia) Dušan Tadić	Ajax	19
2	(Netherlands) Cody Gakpo	PSV	13
2	(Sweden) Jesper Karlsson	AZ	13
4	(Netherlands) Steven Berghuis	Ajax	11
4	(Netherlands) Joey Veerman	PSV	11
6	(Netherlands) Owen Wijndal	AZ	10
7	(Turkey) Orkun Kökçü	Feyenoord	9
8	(Sierra Leone) Issa Kallon	Cambuur	8
8	(Netherlands) Bryan Linssen	Feyenoord	8
8	(Netherlands) Ricky van Wolfswinkel	Twente	8

=== Clean sheets ===
Rank	Player	Club	Clean sheets
1	(Netherlands) Remko Pasveer	Ajax	17
2	(Germany) Lars Unnerstall	Twente	12
3	(Netherlands) Mattijs Branderhorst	NEC	10
4	(Netherlands) Justin Bijlow	Feyenoord	9
5	(Netherlands) Yanick van Osch	Fortuna Sittard	8
6	(Netherlands) Joël Drommel	PSV	7
7	(Greece) Kostas Lamprou	PEC Zwolle	6
7	(Nigeria) Maduka Okoye	Sparta Rotterdam	6
7	(Germany) Timon Wellenreuther	Willem II	6
10	(Germany) Janis Blaswich	Heracles Almelo	5
10	(Suriname) Warner Hahn	Go Ahead Eagles	5
10	(Netherlands) Erwin Mulder	Heerenveen	5
10	(Netherlands) Maarten Paes	Utrecht	5
10	(Germany) Markus Schubert	Vitesse	5
10	(Netherlands) Maarten Stekelenburg	Ajax	5
10	(Netherlands) Etienne Vaessen	RKC Waalwijk	5

=== Discipline ===
==== Player ====
- Most yellow cards: 10
  - (Slovakia) Matúš Bero (Vitesse)
  - (Netherlands) Adam Maher (Utrecht)
  - (Netherlands) Mark van der Maarel (Utrecht)
- Most red cards: 2
  - (Netherlands) Joris Kramer (Go Ahead Eagles)
  - (Netherlands) Mike te Wierik (Groningen)

==== Club ====
- Most yellow cards: 65
  - Vitesse
- Most red cards: 6
  - Vitesse
  - Willem II

== Awards ==
=== Monthly awards ===
Month	Player of the Month		Talent of the Month		Ref.	Team of the Month
Month	Player	Club	Player	Club	Ref.	Team of the Month
August	Bruma	PSV	Ali Akman	NEC		Wellenreuther (Willem II); Mazraoui (Ajax), Janssen (Utrecht), Blind (Ajax); Seuntjens (Fortuna Sittard), Kökçü (Feyenoord), Bruma (PSV); Linssen (Feyenoord), Akman (NEC), Kramer (RKC Waalwijk), Tadić (Ajax)
September	Guus Til	Feyenoord	Jurriën Timber	Ajax		Wellenreuther (Willem II); Blind (Ajax), Martínez (Ajax), J. Timber (Ajax), Mazraoui (Ajax); Gakpo (PSV), Til (Feyenoord), Toornstra (Feyenoord); Tadić (Ajax), Boere (Cambuur), Seuntjens (Fortuna Sittard)
October	Luuk Brouwers	Go Ahead Eagles	Elayis Tavşan	NEC		Pasveer (Ajax); Mazraoui (Ajax); J. Timber (Ajax); Bazoer (Vitesse); Wijndal (AZ); Sangaré (PSV); Brouwers (Go Ahead Eagles); Tavşan (NEC); Openda (Vitesse); Tadić (Ajax); Pavlidis (AZ)
November	Ibrahim Sangaré	PSV	Jurriën Timber	Ajax		Unnerstall (Twente); Mazraoui (Ajax), J. Timber (Ajax), Bakker (Heerenveen), Blind (Ajax); Sangaré (PSV), Bazoer (Vitesse); Linssen (Feyenoord), Tadić (Ajax), Bruma (PSV); Strand Larsen (Groningen)
December	Jesper Karlsson	AZ	Antony	Ajax		Vindahl Jensen (AZ); Mwene (PSV), J. Timber (Ajax); Schuurs (Ajax), Blind (Ajax); Kökçü (Feyenoord), Sangaré (PSV); Antony (Ajax); Linssen (Feyenoord), Karlsson (AZ); Odgaard (RKC Waalwijk)
January	Orkun Kökçü	Feyenoord	Yukinari Sugawara	AZ		Stevens (Cambuur); Mazraoui (Ajax), Hilgers (Twente); Beukema (AZ), Wijndal (AZ); Aursnes (Feyenoord), Kökçü (Feyenoord); Sugawara (AZ); De la Torre (Heracles Almelo), Openda (Vitesse); Kramer (RKC Waalwijk)
February	Orkun Kökçü	Feyenoord	Daishawn Redan	PEC Zwolle		Van Osch (Fortuna Sittard); Mauro Júnior (PSV), J. Timber (Ajax), Martínez (Ajax), Meijer (Groningen); J. Veerman (PSV), Berghuis (Ajax), Kökçü (Feyenoord); Sinisterra (Feyenoord), Haller (Ajax), Redan (PEC Zwolle)
March	Eran Zahavi	PSV	Ryan Gravenberch	Ajax		Okoye (Sparta Rotterdam); Brenet (Twente), Pröpper (Twente), Pleguezuelo (Twente), Max (PSV); De Leeuw (Groningen), Brouwers (Go Ahead Eagles), Gravenberch (Ajax), Karlsson (AZ); Zahavi (PSV), Haller (Ajax)
April	Davy Klaassen	Ajax	Sydney van Hooijdonk	Heerenveen		De Keijzer (Utrecht); Dasa (Vitesse), Blind (Ajax), Mauro Júnior (PSV); J. Veerman (PSV), Klaassen (Ajax), Kökçü (Feyenoord); Van Hooijdonk (Heerenveen), Van Wolfswinkel (Twente), Pavlidis (AZ), Sinisterra (Feyenoord)
May	Loïs Openda	Vitesse	Brian Brobbey	Ajax		Mvogo (PSV Eindhoven); Van Rooij (NEC), Dammers (Willem II), El Karouani (NEC), Smal (Twente); Doan (PSV Eindhoven), Álvarez (Ajax); Thy (Sparta Rotterdam), Openda (Vitesse), Limnios (Twente); Brobbey (Ajax)

=== Annual awards ===
Award	Player	Club	Ref.
Player of the Season	(Netherlands) Jurriën Timber	Ajax	
Talent of the Season	(Netherlands) Jurriën Timber	Ajax	
Goal of the Season	(Belgium) Cyril Ngonge	Groningen	

Team of the Season
Goalkeeper	(Germany) Lars Unnerstall (FC Twente)			
Defenders	(Morocco) Noussair Mazraoui (Ajax)		(Netherlands) Owen Wijndal (AZ)	(Netherlands) Jurriën Timber (Ajax)
Midfielders	(Netherlands) Cody Gakpo (PSV)	(Turkey) Orkun Kökçü (Feyenoord)	(Netherlands) Ryan Gravenberch (Ajax)	(Ivory Coast) Ibrahim Sangaré (PSV)
Forwards	(Brazil) Antony (Ajax)		(Ivory Coast) Sébastien Haller (Ajax)	(Colombia) Luis Sinisterra (Feyenoord)
