= Jaimy Buter =

Dutch footballer (born 2002)

Personal information
- Date of birth: 4 March 2002 (age 24)
- Position: Defender

Team information
- Current team: Zwaluwen

Youth career
- 2011-20: Excelsior Rotterdam

Senior career*
Years	Team	Apps	(Gls)
2020-2023	Excelsior	5	(0)
2024-	Zwaluwen		
- * Club domestic league appearances and goals as of 12:35, 9 May 2023 (UTC)

Jaimy Buter (born 4 March 2002) is a Dutch footballer who plays as a defender for Zwaluwen Vlaardingen.

== Career ==
Buter made his professional debut in the Eerste Divisie appearing as a substitute as Excelsior Rotterdam played Jong AZ at Excelsior's Stadion Woudestein on 20 November 2020. Buter had joined the academy at Excelsior Rotterdam when he was nine years old. Ten years later in June 2021 he was given a professional contract until 2023. Buter commented that he took pride in the fact so many youth products had developed together at Excelsior and so many of his childhood friends, such as Joshua Eijgenraam, and Delano Gouda were training and playing together in the first team.

In 2025, Buter was playing for VV Zwaluwen.
