= List of Excelsior Rotterdam seasons =

This is a list of the seasons played by Excelsior Rotterdam from 1965.

== Summary of Excelsior Rotterdam seasons ==
=== 1960s ===
Excelsior Rotterdam competed in the Tweede Divisie for most of the decade. They earned promotion to the Eerste Divisie in the 1968–69 season after finishing second. Their best KNVB Cup performance was reaching the quarter-finals in the 1967–68 season.

=== 1970s ===
The club frequently moved between divisions during the 1970s. They were promoted to the Eredivisie in 1970, 1974, and 1979, and relegated in 1973 and 1976. Excelsior had a notable cup run in the 1977–78 season, reaching the semi-finals.

=== 1980s ===
Excelsior Rotterdam continued to experience promotions and relegations throughout the 1980s. They were promoted to the Eredivisie in 1982 and relegated again in 1981 and 1987. Their best Eredivisie finish was 9th place in the 1982–83 season. The team reached the quarter-finals of the KNVB Cup in 1986–87.

=== 1990s ===
The club spent the entire decade in the Eerste Divisie. They had mostly mid- to lower-table finishes, with their best league performance being 3rd place in the 1994–95 season. Their cup performances included several appearances in the round of 16.

=== 2000s ===
Excelsior achieved multiple promotions to the Eredivisie in 2002, 2006, and 2010. They were relegated in 2003 and 2008. The club's best KNVB Cup performance during the decade was a quarter-final appearance in 2002–03.

=== 2010s ===
This decade saw several promotions and relegations. Excelsior were promoted in 2010 and 2014, and relegated in 2012 and 2019. Their best Eredivisie result was 11th place in the 2017–18 season. The team reached the semi-finals of the KNVB Cup in 2014–15.

=== 2020s ===
In the early 2020s, Excelsior played in both the Eerste Divisie and Eredivisie. They were promoted in 2022 and 2025, and relegated in 2023. Their most notable cup run was a quarter-final appearance in 2020–21.

== Seasons ==
Key to KNVB Cup rounds:

- 2R – Second round
- 3R – Third round
- GS – Group stage
- QF – Quarter-final
- R16 – 1/8 Final (round of 16)
- R32 – 1/16 Final (round of 32)
- SF – Semi-final

Seasons of Excelsior Rotterdam
#	Season	League					KNVB Cup	Top scorer(s)	
#	Season	Division	Total	Consecutive	Pts	Pos	KNVB Cup	Player(s)	Goals
1	1965–66	Tweede Divisie Group B	1st	1st	25	9th	GS	—	—
2	1966–67	Tweede Divisie	1st	1st	51	9th	—	—	—
3	1967–68	Tweede Divisie	2nd	2nd	33	16th	QF	—	—
4	1968–69	Tweede Divisie	3rd	3rd	48	2nd (Note: Promoted to Eerste Divisie.)	2R	—	—
5	1969–70	Eerste Divisie	1st	1st	48	2nd (Note: Promoted to Eredivisie.)	2R	—	—
6	1970–71	Eredivisie	1st	1st	20	16th	2R	—	—
7	1971–72	Eredivisie	2nd	2nd	20	15th	QF	—	—
8	1972–73	Eredivisie	3rd	3rd	18	17th (Note: Relegated to Eerste Divisie.)	3R	—	—
9	1973–74	Eerste Divisie	2nd	1st	52	1st	3R	—	—
10	1974–75	Eredivisie	4th	1st	26	14th	2R	—	—
11	1975–76	Eredivisie	5th	2nd	19	18th	2R	—	—
12	1976–77	Eerste Divisie	3rd	1st	47	4th	R16	—	—
13	1977–78	Eerste Divisie	4th	2nd	45	4th	SF	—	—
14	1978–79	Eerste Divisie	5th	3rd	51	1st	2R	—	—
15	1979–80	Eredivisie	6th	1st	27	13th	2R	—	—
16	1980–81	Eredivisie	7th	2nd	21	17th	2R	—	—
17	1981–82	Eerste Divisie	6th	1st	44	3rd (Note: Promoted to Eredivisie via play-offs.)	R16	—	—
18	1982–83	Eredivisie	8th	1st	32	9th	2R	—	—
19	1983–84	Eredivisie	9th	2nd	31	13th	1R	—	—
20	1984–85	Eredivisie	10th	3rd	30	12th	R16	—	—
21	1985–86	Eredivisie	11th	4th	25	15th	1R	—	—
22	1986–87	Eredivisie	12th	5th	19	18th	QF	—	—
23	1987–88	Eerste Divisie	7th	1st	38	8th	R16	—	—
24	1988–89	Eerste Divisie	8th	2nd	49	3rd	1R	—	—
25	1989–90	Eerste Divisie	9th	3rd	33	14th	2R	—	—
26	1990–91	Eerste Divisie	10th	4th	23	19th	2R	—	—
27	1991–92	Eerste Divisie	11th	5th	34	15th	3R	—	—
28	1992–93	Eerste Divisie	12th	6th	24	14th	R16	—	—
29	1993–94	Eerste Divisie	13th	7th	30	12th	3R	—	—
30	1994–95	Eerste Divisie	14th	8th	44	3rd	R32	—	—
31	1995–96	Eerste Divisie	15th	9th	29	16th	GS	—	—
32	1996–97	Eerste Divisie	16th	10th	24	17th	GS	—	—
33	1997–98	Eerste Divisie	17th	11th	30	16th	GS	—	—
34	1998–99	Eerste Divisie	18th	12th	54	6th	R32	—	—
35	1999–00	Eerste Divisie	19th	13th	59	4th	R16	—	—
36	2000–01	Eerste Divisie	20th	14th	66	2nd	R16	—	—
37	2001–02	Eerste Divisie	21st	15th	70	2nd	R16	—	—
38	2002–03	Eredivisie	13th	1st	23	17th	QF	—	—
39	2003–04	Eerste Divisie	22nd	1st	74	2nd	R32	—	—
40	2004–05	Eerste Divisie	23rd	2nd	44	12th	2R	—	—
41	2005–06	Eerste Divisie	24th	3rd	75	1st	2R	—	—
42	2006–07	Eredivisie	14th	1st	30	16th	3R	—	—
43	2007–08	Eredivisie	15th	2nd	27	18th	R16	—	—
44	2008–09	Eerste Divisie	25th	1st	61	5th	R16	—	—
45	2009–10	Eerste Divisie	26th	2nd	65	3rd	R32	—	—
46	2010–11	Eredivisie	16th	1st	35	16th	R32	—	—
47	2011–12	Eredivisie	17th	2nd	19	18th	R32	—	—
48	2012–13	Eerste Divisie	27th	1st	21	15th	2R	—	—
49	2013–14	Eerste Divisie	28th	2nd	66	3rd	R16	—	—
50	2014–15	Eredivisie	18th	1st	32	15th	SF	—	—
51	2015–16	Eredivisie	19th	2nd	30	15th	R32	(Netherlands) Tom van Weert	15
52	2016–17	Eredivisie	20th	3rd	37	12th	R32	(Suriname) Nigel Hasselbaink	11
53	2017–18	Eredivisie	21st	4th	40	11th	1R	(Netherlands) Mike van Duinen	10
54	2018–19	Eredivisie	22nd	5th	33	16th (Note: Relegated to Eerste Divisie via play-offs.)	1R	(Iceland) Elías Már Ómarsson	8
55	2019–20	Eerste Divisie	29th	1st	47	7th	R32	(Netherlands) Rai Vloet	14
56	2020–21	Eerste Divisie	30th	2nd	48	9th	QF	(Iceland) Elías Már Ómarsson	21
57	2021–22	Eerste Divisie	31st	3rd	66	6th	R32	(Netherlands) Thijs Dallinga	36
58	2022–23	Eredivisie	23rd	1st	32	15th	R32	(Greece) Lazaros Lamprou	6
59	2023–24	Eredivisie	24th	2nd	29	16th	R16	(Belgium) Troy Parrott	17
60	2024–25	Eerste Divisie	32nd	1st	72	2nd	R16	(Netherlands) Lance Duijvestijn	12
61	2025–26	Eredivisie	25th	1st				—	—
