= Theo Custers =

Belgian footballer

Personal information
- Full name: Theodore Laurent Custers
- Date of birth: 10 August 1950 (age 76)
- Place of birth: Genk, Belgium
- Height: 1.86 m (6 ft 1 in)
- Position: Goalkeeper

Senior career*
Years	Team	Apps	(Gls)
1971–1975	Waterschei THOR	103	(0)
1975–1980	FC Antwerp	130	(0)
1981	Helmond Sport	19	(0)
1981–1983	Espanyol	34	(0)
1983–1986	KV Mechelen	96	(0)
1986–1988	Bornem	57	(0)
Total		439	(0)

International career
1979–1982	Belgium	10	(0)
- * Club domestic league appearances and goals

Theodore Laurent Custers (born 10 August 1950 in Genk) is a Belgian retired footballer who played as a goalkeeper.

== Club career ==
During his club career he played for Thor Waterschei, FC Antwerp, Helmond Sport, Espanyol, K.V. Mechelen and SV Bornem.

== International career ==
At international level, he also earned 10 caps for the Belgium national football team, and participated in the 1982 FIFA World Cup and UEFA Euro 1980. His nickname was the Walrus because of his distinctive moustache.

== Personal life ==
Custers has been sentenced twice to serve time in prison for not paying alimony to his ex-wife.

His son Bo Geens is a professional footballer who played for Eendracht Aalst and in the Dutch Eerste Divisie.

== Career statistics ==
=== International ===
Appearances and goals by national team and year
National team	Year	Apps	Goals
Belgium	1979	4	0
Belgium	1980	4	0
Belgium	1981	–	
Belgium	1982	2	0
Total		10	0

== Honours ==
=== Player ===
Waterschei

- Belgian Third Division: 1973–74

=== International ===
Belgium

- UEFA European Championship: 1980 (runners-up)
- Belgian Sports Merit Award: 1980
