= Kenneth Goudmijn =

Dutch footballer

Personal information
- Full name: Kenneth Humphrey Goudmijn
- Date of birth: December 4, 1970 (age 55)
- Place of birth: Paramaribo, Suriname
- Positions: Attacking midfielder; right forward

Youth career
- HSV Waard '75
- SVW '27

Senior career*
Years	Team	Apps	(Gls)
1990–1991	AZ	2	(0)
1991–1993	Eindhoven	40	(6)
1995–1997	AZ	51	(3)
1997–1999	Haarlem	63	(16)
1999–2002	Cambuur	88	(17)
Total		244	(42)

International career
1993	Netherlands (futsal)	3	(1)

Managerial career
- 2020–2025: AZ (assistant)
- * Club domestic league appearances and goals

Kenneth Goudmijn (born 4 December 1970) is a Dutch retired footballer, who most recently was the assistant manager of Eredivisie club AZ. He had been in the role since the 2020–2021 season. He has made over 200 appearances in his career as a footballer.

== Personal life ==
Goudmijn was born Kenneth Humphrey Goudmijn, in Paramaribo, the capital of Suriname, on 4 December 1970 and grew up in Heerhugowaard. He has a son, Kenzo Goudmijn, who is also a footballer, playing as a midfielder for English club Derby County.

== Career ==
=== Player ===
Goudmijn began his professional football career with AZ as a player in the 1990–1991 season, but left the club for Eindhoven, only to return to AZ after two seasons and a spell at amateur side Hollandia.

During the 1995–1996 season, he made 32 appearances for the club, scoring 3 goals. In the following season, he played 19 matches for them in the Eredivisie. He later moved to Haarlem for the 1997–1998 season, where he made 31 appearances in the Eerste Divisie. Goudmijn continued at HFC Haarlem in the 1998–1999 season, playing in 32 matches in the Eerste Divisie.

In 1999, he joined SC Cambuur, where he played 28 matches in the Eredivisie during the 1999–2000 season. He remained with SC Cambuur for the next two seasons, making 30 appearances each season in the Eerste Divisie, and scoring 15 goals.

Goudmijn also played 3 games for the Netherlands national futsal team

=== Assistant manager ===
In 2016, Goudmijn became the assistant manager for AZ's under-16 team, with whom he won a league title the following season. In 2020, Goudmijn joined AZ as an assistant manager to Pascal Jansen, replacing Marino Pusic. He signed a two-year contract until 2022. He was dismissed in December 2025.

== Career statistics ==
=== Club ===
Club	Season	League			National Cup		Total	
Club	Season	Division	Apps	Goals	Apps	Goals	Apps	Goals
AZ Alkmaar	1995–1996	Eredivisie	0	0	1	0	1	0
AZ Alkmaar	1996–1997	Eredivisie	19	0	1	0	20	0
HFC Haarlem	1997–1998	Eerste Divisie	31	6	0	0	31	6
HFC Haarlem	1998–1999	Eerste Divisie	32	10	0	0	32	10
SC Cambuur	1999–2000	Eredivisie	28	2	0	0	28	2
SC Cambuur	2000–2001	Eerste Divisie	30	6	0	0	30	6
SC Cambuur	2001–2002	Eerste Divisie	30	9	0	0	30	9
Career total			170	33	2	0	172	33
