= Michael Chacon =

American racing cyclist (born 1992)

Michael Chacon (born July 3, 1992) is a professional fixed-gear bicycle rider. He is ranked among the top fixed freestyle riders in the world. Chacon started riding fixed gear bikes in his hometown of Culver City, CA in 2009. Before turning professional, Chacon gained a local following performing freestyle tricks along the boardwalk of Venice Beach, CA. Since his pro debut in February 2010 he has won and placed in fixed gear competitions internationally.

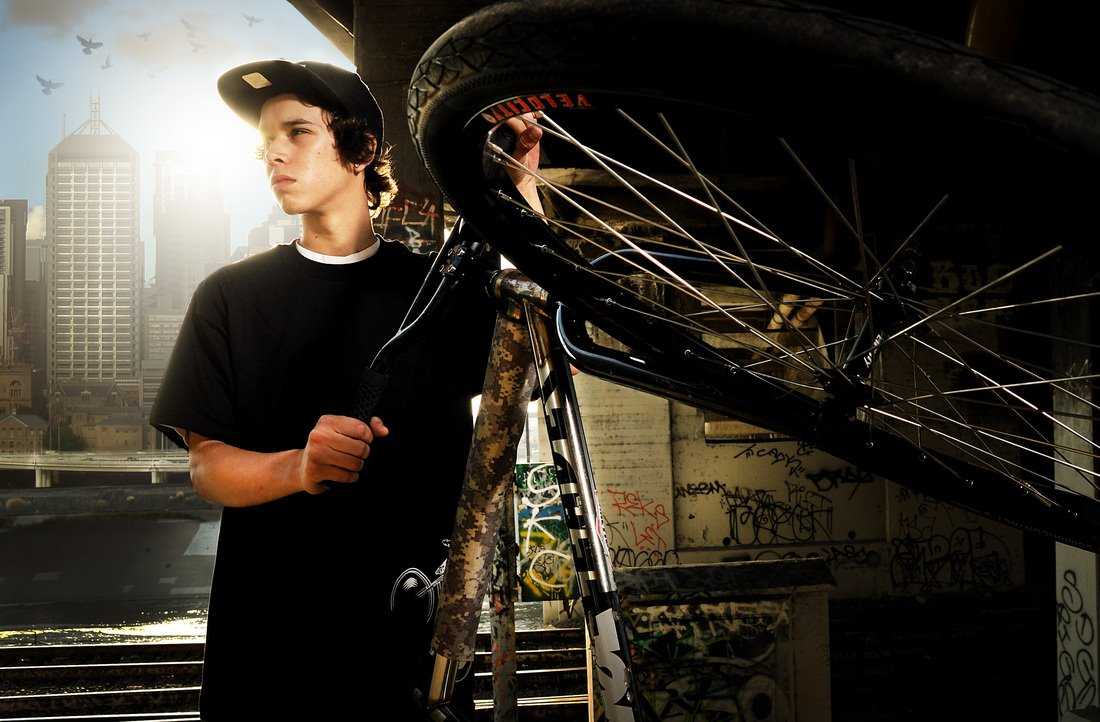
Michael Chacon Fixed Gear Trick Rider

== Career highlights ==
- Chacon has appeared in numerous commercials during his freestyle career.
- In April 2017, Chacon did an interview with Unsettle & Company and was named "Cyclist of the Week."
- In February 2015, MICHAEL CHACON X UNDEFEATED X LEADER BIKES released their second custom one-of-a-kind bike collaboration.
- In May 2014, Michael Chacon was featured in a VANS X BROTURES X LEADER BIKES promotion for release in Japan and worldwide on the web.
- In May 2013, Michael Chacon revealed two MICHAEL CHACON X UNDEFEATED X LEADER BIKES one-of-a-kind collaboration bikes—one a Leader track bike and one a Leader Hurricane freestyle bike. Chacon rode the Leader Hurricane at the 2013 Red Bull Ride + Style competition in San Francisco, California.
- In May 2013, Chacon was invited to Tecate, Baja California by Tecate Fixed to put on a demonstration of Fixed Gear Freestyle Trick Riding.
- In April 2013, Chacon was selected by Red Bull to be one of the Fixed Gear Freestyle Trick Riders from around the world (including the U.S., Japan, Portugal and France) to participate in Red Bull's Third Annual Ride + Style competition in San Francisco, California.
- On February 6, 2013, Chacon was selected by Nike Sportswear to be a part of their KEEP IT COMING Campaign for the Nike AF1 shoes.
- On June 18, 2012, Chacon was invited to travel to Japan and compete in Tokushuma's Fixed Gear Event "Shiokaze" by Leader Bikes and Brotures Bike Shop, where he won first place.
- In May 2012, Chacon was selected for the second year in a row by Red Bull to be one of few Fixed Gear Freestyle Trick Riders worldwide to participate in Red Bull's Second Annual Ride + Style competition in San Francisco, California.
- On March 27, 2012, Michael was invited to participate on a TV show in Rome, Italy to attempt to break the Guinness World Record on his Fixed Gear Bike for the most jumps on a bike with a jump rope in 60 seconds.
- In November 2011, Chacon's Signature Leader Bike "The Hurricane" was featured at the Ford Booth at the SEMA Auto show on a Ford Focus built by the ID Agency.
- In September 2011, Chacon collaborated with Hold Fast to create "Chacon" pedal straps.
- On July 17, 2011, Undefeated welcomed Chacon as its newest team member.
- In July 2011, Chacon was featured in a video shot by photographer and director Estevan Oriol.
- In June 2011, Chacon was invited by Rocket Company to do a demo and compete in Jakarta, Indonesia.
- In May 2011, Chacon was tapped by Nike Sportswear for its Nike L.A. Destroyer Jacket campaign and named "More Than a Gamechanger."
- In May 2011, Chacon was selected by Red Bull to be one of 24 Fixed Gear Freestyle Trick Riders worldwide to participate in Red Bull's First Annual Ride + Style in San Francisco, California.
- In March 2011, Chacon was invited to tour Europe and participate in the Trick Trick Boom competition in Paris, France and the West Jam Fixed Competition in Lisbon, Portugal.

== Signature Logo ==
In July 2011, it was announced that Michael Chacon's logo would be designed by Los Angeles-based tattoo and graffiti artist Mister Cartoon.

== Social media ==
https://twitter.com/Michaelchacon1

https://www.instagram.com/mikechacon/
