= Kenzo Goudmijn =

Dutch footballer (born 2001)

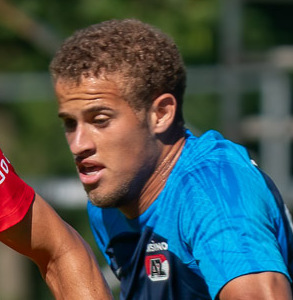
- Goudmijn in 2023 playing for AZ

Personal information
- Date of birth: 18 December 2001 (age 24)
- Place of birth: Heerhugowaard, The Netherlands
- Height: 1.73 m (5 ft 8 in)
- Position: Midfielder

Team information
- Current team: Grasshopper (on loan from Derby County)
- Number: 24

Youth career
- –2010: Reiger Boys
- 2010–2019: AZ

Senior career*
Years	Team	Apps	(Gls)
2018–2023	Jong AZ	84	(6)
2019–2024	AZ	13	(0)
2021–2022	→ Sparta Rotterdam (loan)	11	(0)
2022–2023	→ Excelsior (loan)	52	(5)
2024	→ Excelsior (loan)	18	(0)
2024–	Derby County	44	(2)
2025–2026	→ Go Ahead Eagles (loan)	16	(0)
2026–	→ Grasshopper (loan)	3	(0)

International career
2017	Netherlands U16	4	(2)
2017–2018	Netherlands U17	12	(0)
2018–2019	Netherlands U18	4	(0)
2019	Netherlands U19	6	(0)
Medal record
Representing Netherlands
UEFA European Under-17 Championship
Winner	England 2018	U-17 Team
- * Club domestic league appearances and goals as of 28 September 2026

Kenzo Goudmijn (born 18 December 2001) is a Dutch professional footballer who plays as a midfielder for Swiss Super League club Grasshopper, on loan from EFL Championship club Derby County.

Goudmijn started his career at AZ, making his debut for Jong AZ in 2018 and the first team in 2019, whilst at AZ he would have loan spells at Sparta Rotterdam in 2021 and two spells at Excelsior in 2022 and 2024. In July 2024, he would move to England to sign with Derby County on a four-year contract. In September 2025, Goudmijm returned to the Netherlands, joining Go Ahead Eagles on a season-long loan. In September 2026, he joined Swiss club Grasshopper on a season-long loan with an option to make the move permanent.

== Club career ==
=== AZ ===
On 7 January 2022, Goudmijn joined Excelsior on loan until the end of the season. The loan was extended for the 2022–23 season.

In January 2024, Goudmijn returned to Excelsior on an eighteen-month loan deal.

=== Derby County ===
On 10 July 2024, Goudmjin moved to England and signed with Derby County of the EFL Championship on a four-year contract for an undisclosed fee from AZ. On 9 August 2024, he made his debut for the club in a 2–4 loss against Blackburn Rovers in the league. Goudmjin scored his first goal for Derby in the 28th minute of a 3–0 win against Bristol City on 31 August 2024. Goudmijn's performances earned praise from Derby fans and head coach Paul Warne in October; with Warne stating that "He is good with his feet; he accelerates away from people - he's just a really good footballer. I thought he was our outstanding performer at the weekend (v QPR). He really helped us have a bit of guile and control at times when we didn't.". Goudmijn scored in Derby's next match, a 1–0 over Cardiff City on 14 September 2024. Under head coach Warne, Goudmjin was a regular in the Rams starting 11. After declining form in early 2025, Warne was dismissed and replaced by John Eustace in February 2025. Under Eustace; Goudmjin lost his place in the team to Everton loanee Harrison Armstrong, under Eustace Goudmijin was restricted to substitute appearances. Goudmijn made 44 appearances in his first season at Derby, scoring twice.

Goudmijn played four times for Derby during the 2025–26 season, but fell down the pecking order after the likes of Lewis Travis joined the club. On 4 September 2025, Goudmijn joined Eredivisie side Go Ahead Eagles on a season-long loan deal. Goudmijn played 23 times for the club during his loan spell, scoring one goal on 17 December 2025 in the KNVB Beker at Roda JC.

On 8 September 2026, he joined Swiss record champions Grasshopper on loan for the season. The loan agreement includes an option to make the move permanent.

== International career ==
Goudmijn played 12 games for the Netherlands national under-17 football team and 4 for the U18s.

== Personal life ==
Kenzo Goudmijn is the son of former AZ player Kenneth Goudmijn. Through his father, Goudmijn is of Surinamese descent.

== Career statistics ==
=== Club ===
As of 8 September 2026

Appearances and goals by club, season and competition
Club	Season	League			National cup (Note: Includes KNVB Cup, FA Cup)		League cup (Note: Includes EFL Cup)		Europe		Other		Total	
Club	Season	Division	Apps	Goals	Apps	Goals	Apps	Goals	Apps	Goals	Apps	Goals	Apps	Goals
Jong AZ	2017–18	Eerste Divisie	7	1	—		—		—		—		7	1
Jong AZ	2018–19	Eerste Divisie	31	2	—		—		—		—		31	2
Jong AZ	2019–20	Eerste Divisie	22	0	—		—		—		—		22	0
Jong AZ	2020–21	Eerste Divisie	23	4	—		—		—		—		23	4
Jong AZ	2023–24	Eerste Divisie	1	0	—		—		—		—		1	0
Jong AZ	Total		84	6	0	0	0	0	0	0	0	0	84	6
AZ	2018–19	Eredivisie	1	0	0	0	—		0	0	—		1	0
AZ	2019–20	Eredivisie	1	0	1	0	—		0	0	—		2	0
AZ	2020–21	Eredivisie	3	0	0	0	—		0	0	—		3	0
AZ	2021–22	Eredivisie	0	0	0	0	—		0	0	—		0	0
AZ	2022–23	Eredivisie	0	0	0	0	—		0	0	—		0	0
AZ	2023–24	Eredivisie	8	0	1	0	—		5 (Note: Appearances in UEFA Europa Conference League)	0	—		14	0
AZ	Total		13	0	2	0	0	0	5	0	0	0	20	0
Sparta Rotterdam (loan)	2021–22	Eredivisie	11	0	1	0	—		—		—		12	0
Excelsior (loan)	2021–22	Eerste Divisie	18	1	0	0	—		—		6 (Note: Appearances in the Eredivise promotion/relegation playoffs)	0	24	1
Excelsior (loan)	2022–23	Eredivisie	34	4	2	0	—		—		—		36	4
Excelsior (loan)	2023–24	Eredivisie	18	0	1	0	—		—		4	0	23	0
Excelsior (loan)	Total		70	5	3	0	0	0	0	0	10	0	83	5
Derby County	2024–25	Championship	41	2	1	0	2	0	—		—		44	2
Derby County	2025–26	Championship	3	0	0	0	1	0	—		—		4	0
Derby County	2026–27	Championship	0	0	0	0	0	0	—		—		0	0
Derby County	Total		44	2	1	0	3	0	0	0	0	0	48	2
Go Ahead Eagles (loan)	2025–26	Eredivisie	16	0	2	1	—		5 (Note: Appearances in UEFA Europa League)	0	—		23	1
Grasshopper (loan)	2026–27	Swiss Super League	0	0	0	0	—		—		—		0	0
Career total			238	13	9	1	3	0	10	0	10	0	270	14

== Honours ==
Netherlands U17

- UEFA European Under-17 Championship: 2018
