= Hugo Botermans =

Dutch footballer

Personal information
- Date of birth: 2 March 2000 (age 26)
- Place of birth: Delft, Netherlands
- Height: 1.87 m (6 ft 2 in)
- Position: Forward

Team information
- Current team: DSO

Youth career
- –2012: FC Zoetermeer
- 2012–2015: Alphense Boys
- 2015–2019: ADO Den Haag

Senior career*
Years	Team	Apps	(Gls)
2019–2020	Jong ADO Den Haag	20	(11)
2020–2021	ADO Den Haag	0	(0)
2020–2021	→ Eindhoven (loan)	36	(8)
2021	Excelsior	8	(0)
2022	Katwijk	26	(2)
2023	ASWH	15	(3)
2023–	DSO		
- * Club domestic league appearances and goals as of 5 September 2023

Hugo Botermans (born 2 March 2000) is a Dutch professional footballer who plays as a forward for DSO.

== Club career ==
Hugo Botermans played in the youth of FC Zoetermeer, Alphense Boys and ADO Den Haag.

=== Jong ADO and FC Eindhoven ===
In 2019, Jong ADO Den Haag joined the KNVB football pyramid and Botermans played with that team for a season in the Derde Divisie. During 20 caps at Jong ADO, he scored 11 goals.

He was loaned to FC Eindhoven in the 2020–21 season. He made his debut in professional football for Eindhoven on 28 August 2020 in a 1–2 away victory against Jong FC Utrecht. Botermans replaced Alef João in the 65th minute and forced the penalty that resulted in the winning goal. The following week, in the 2–3 loss against SC Telstar, he scored a 1–1 equalizer as his first goal in professional football. In total, he scored 8 goals in 36 caps. At the end of the Eindhoven season, the contract of Botermans with ADO expired.

=== Excelsior and Katwijk ===
During a trial period at FC Den Bosch, Boterman scored in a practice game against Nivo Sparta. In September 2021, Botermans joined Excelsior Rotterdam on a free transfer. He had 8 Eerste Divisie caps, all as a substitute and without scoring goals. He did open in two National Cup games and scored twice. Botermans and Excelsior agreed to separate in the winter break of 2021.

On 31 January 2022, Botermans signed a 1.5-year contract with VV Katwijk in the Tweede Divisie. Late August 2022, Botermans suffered an ankle injury in a tournament game against Koninklijke HFC. He recovered and separated from Katwijk in December 2022. At Katwijk he had 26 caps, scoring 2 goals.

=== ASWH and DSO ===
On 16 December 2022, Botermans signed a new 1.5-year contract with the Hendrik-Ido-Ambacht-side ASWH in the Derde Divisie. Botermans scored 3 goals and had 2 assists in 15 games, yet in the summer of 2023, ASWH relegated to the Vierde Divisie. At the start of the new season, ASWH and Botermans separated.

In the 2023–24 season, he plays at SV DSO.
