= Nathan Markelo =

Curaçao footballer (born 1999)

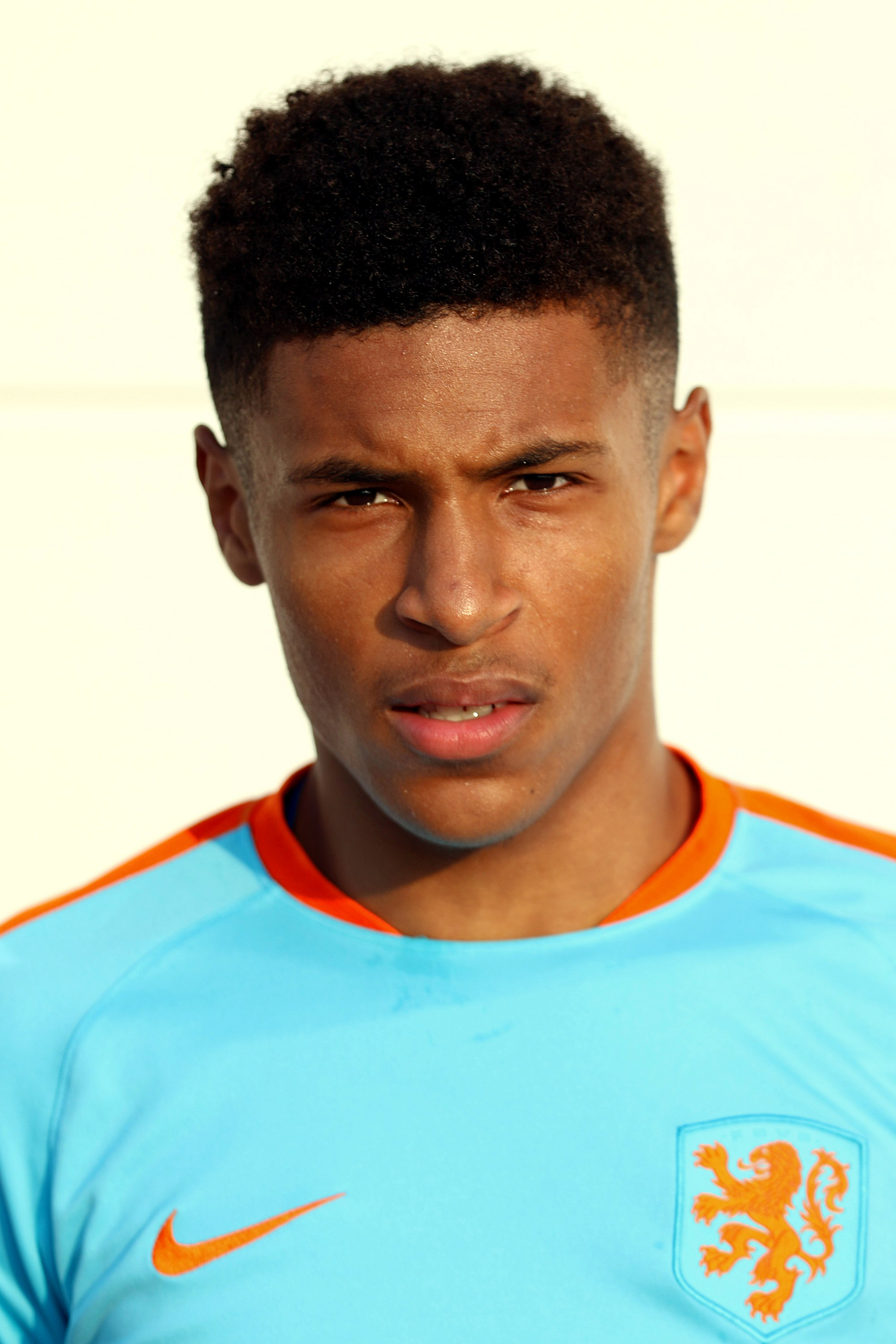
- Markelo playing for Netherlands U18s in March 2017.

Personal information
- Full name: Nathangelo Alexandro Markelo
- Date of birth: 7 January 1999 (age 27)
- Place of birth: Groningen, Netherlands
- Height: 1.82 m (6 ft 0 in)
- Position: Midfielder

Team information
- Current team: Vitesse
- Number: 24

Youth career
- Volendam
- 2017–2020: Everton

Senior career*
Years	Team	Apps	(Gls)
2020–2021	Everton	0	(0)
2020–2021	→ Twente (loan)	13	(0)
2021–2022	Jong PSV	30	(0)
2022–2023	Excelsior	14	(0)
2023–2024	Fortuna Sittard	3	(0)
2024–2025	Roda JC	4	(0)
2025	Hebar Pazardzhik	16	(0)
2025–	Vitesse	27	(0)

International career^{‡}
2016–2017	Netherlands U18	5	(0)
2018	Netherlands U19	1	(0)
2018–2019	Netherlands U20	6	(0)
2018–2019	Netherlands U21	2	(0)
2022–	Curaçao	11	(0)
- * Club domestic league appearances and goals as of 28 April 2026 ‡ National team caps and goals as of 10:22, 28 January 2026 (UTC)

Nathangelo Alexandro Markelo (born 7 January 1999) is a professional footballer who plays as a midfielder for Eerste Divisie club Vitesse. Born in the Netherlands, he plays for the Curaçao national team.

== Club career ==
Born in Groningen, Markelo was signed by English club Everton in 2017 after being scouted playing in a youth tournament for FC Volendam. He moved on loan to FC Twente in July 2020.

He signed for Jong PSV in August 2021 on a permanent deal.

On 9 July 2022, Markelo joined Excelsior on a three-year contract. At the end of the 2022–23 season, his contract with Excelsior was terminated by mutual consent.

On 3 August 2023, Markelo signed a contract with Fortuna Sittard for one season, with an option to extend for two more years.

After one season at Fortuna, Markelo joined Eerste Divisie club Roda JC on 27 June 2024. He signed a two-year deal, with an option to extend for one more year. He made his competitive debut for the club on 4 October, replacing Jay Kruiver in the 80th minute of a 3–0 victory against Excelsior. The contract with Roda was mutually dissolved on 22 January 2025.

Later that month, Markelo signed for Bulgarian First League club Hebar Pazardzhik.

In September 2025, Markelo joined Eerste Divisie side Vitesse.

== International career ==
Born in the Netherlands, Markelo is of Curaçao and Surinamese descent. He has represented the Netherlands are various youth international levels. He debuted with the Curaçao national team in a friendly 3–2 loss to Indonesia on 25 September 2022.

== Personal life ==
His younger brother Jahnoah Markelo is also a footballer.

== Honours ==
Everton U23s

- Premier League Cup: 2018–19
