= Nikita Vlasenko =

Swiss and Ukrainian footballer (born 2001)

Personal information
- Date of birth: 20 March 2001 (age 25)
- Place of birth: Donetsk, Ukraine
- Height: 1.90 m (6 ft 3 in)
- Position: Defender

Team information
- Current team: Komárno
- Number: 4

Youth career
- 2016–2019: Lugano
- 2019: → Juventus (loan)

Senior career*
Years	Team	Apps	(Gls)
2019–2022	Juventus	0	(0)
2020–2021	→ Sion (loan)	0	(0)
2021–2022	→ Excelsior (loan)	21	(0)
2022–2023	Rijeka	4	(1)
2024	Servette II	16	(2)
2025	Arsenal Dzerzhinsk	25	(1)
2026	Vukovar 1991	8	(0)
2026–	Komárno	1	(0)

International career
2019	Switzerland U19	2	(0)
- * Club domestic league appearances and goals as of 22 September 2026

Nikita Vlasenko (Ukrainian: Микита Власенко; born 20 March 2001) is a footballer who plays as a defender for Slovak club Komárno. Born in Ukraine, he is a youth international for Switzerland.

== Career ==
=== Club career ===
In 2019, he signed for Italian Serie A side Juventus. In 2020, Vlasenko was sent on loan to Sion in Switzerland. In 2021, he was sent on loan to Dutch second division club Excelsior. On 20 August 2021, he debuted for Excelsior during a 1-1 draw with FC Volendam.

On 18 July 2022, Vlasenko signed with Rijeka in Croatia.

On 7 February 2025, Belarusian club Arsenal Dzerzhinsk announced the signing of Vlasenko.
