= Sacha Komljenovic =

Dutch footballer (born 2003)

Personal information
- Date of birth: 10 May 2003 (age 23)
- Place of birth: Zoetermeer, Netherlands
- Height: 1.78 m (5 ft 10 in)
- Position: Midfielder

Team information
- Current team: Artis Brno
- Number: 8

Youth career
- DWO Zoetermeer
- DSO Zoetermeer
- 2018–2021: ADO Den Haag

Senior career*
Years	Team	Apps	(Gls)
2021–2024	ADO Den Haag	41	(2)
2024–2026	Baník Ostrava	0	(0)
2024–2025	→ Baník Ostrava B	46	(11)
2026	→ Mura (loan)	0	(0)
2026–	Artis Brno	0	(0)
- * Club domestic league appearances and goals as of 17 February 2026

Sacha Komljenovic (Serbian: Саша Комљеновић, romanized: Saša Komljenović; Russian: Саша Комленович, romanized: Sasha Komlenovich; born 10 May 2003) is a Dutch professional footballer who plays as a midfielder for Czech First League club Artis Brno.

== Early life ==
Komljenovic was born in Zoetermeer, South Holland, to a Serbian father and a Russian mother.

== Career ==
After playing youth football for DWO Zoetermeer and DSO Zoetermeer, Komljenovic joined ADO Den Haag's academy in July 2018. In February 2021, Komljenovic signed a professional contract until summer 2023. He broke into Den Haag's first team for the 2021–22 Eerste Divisie, as he made 18 appearances during the regular season. On 10 May 2022, he scored his first goal for the club with a 93rd-minute winner in their 2–1 first leg play-off win over NAC Breda.

On 16 February 2026, Komljenovic joined Slovenian club NŠ Mura on a half-year loan deal without an option.

On 27 June 2026, Komljenovic signed a contract with Czech First League club Artis Brno.

== Career statistics ==
As of match played 16 January 2024

Appearances and goals by club, season and competition
Club	Season	League			Cup		Other		Total	
Club	Season	Division	Apps	Goals	Apps	Goals	Apps	Goals	Apps	Goals
ADO Den Haag	2021–22	Eerste Divisie	18	0	1	0	4 (Note: Appearances in Promotion Playoffs)	2	23	2
ADO Den Haag	2022–23	Eerste Divisie	11	1	0	0	—		11	1
ADO Den Haag	2023–24	Eerste Divisie	12	1	3	0	—		15	1
Career total			41	2	4	0	4	2	49	4
