= Bo Geens =

Belgian footballer (born 1995)

Personal information
- Date of birth: 10 August 1995 (age 31)
- Place of birth: Mechelen, Belgium
- Height: 1.83 m (6 ft 0 in)
- Position: Goalkeeper

Team information
- Current team: KSC City Pirates
- Number: 20

Youth career
- –2013: Lokeren

Senior career*
Years	Team	Apps	(Gls)
2013–2018	Lokeren	0	(0)
2016–2017	→ MVV (loan)	42	(0)
2018–2020	Lierse	16	(0)
2019	→ Eendracht Aalst (loan)	10	(0)
2020–2021	TOP Oss	38	(0)
2021–2022	Excelsior	1	(0)
2022–2023	Wezel Sport	19	(0)
2023–	KSC City Pirates	36	(0)

International career
2014	Belgium U19	2	(0)
- * Club domestic league appearances and goals as of 16 January 2026

Bo Geens (born 10 August 1995) is a Belgian footballer who plays as a goalkeeper for KSC City Pirates.

== Career ==
Geens joined MVV Maastricht in 2016 on loan from Lokeren. He made his Eerste Divisie debut on 5 August 2016 against Helmond Sport. He played the full game.

Upon his return to Lokeren, however, his chances of playing again faltered. In 2018, Geens moved to Lierse Kempenzonen, where he started the season as the starting goalkeeper. There he eventually fell in the depth chart and was passed by Senne Vits and Thibaut Rausin. During the second half of the 2018–19 season, Lierse Kempenzonen loaned him out to division rivals Eendracht Aalst.

On his return, Geens failed to win the competition with Rausin. After his contract with Lierse Kempenzonen expired at the end of the 2019–20 season, he signed a one-year contract with Dutch Eerste Divisie club TOP Oss on 27 August 2020.

On 2 August 2021, he joined Excelsior for one season.

== Personal life ==
His father Theo Custers is a former Belgian international goalkeeper who played for FC Antwerp and in the Dutch and Spanish leagues.
