= Joshua Eijgenraam =

Dutch footballer (born 2002)

Personal information
- Date of birth: 18 February 2002 (age 24)
- Place of birth: Berkel en Rodenrijs, Netherlands
- Height: 1.85 m (6 ft 1 in)
- Position: Defensive midfielder

Team information
- Current team: Taranto

Youth career
- 2008–2014: TOGB
- 2014–2020: Excelsior

Senior career*
Years	Team	Apps	(Gls)
2020–2025	Excelsior	72	(0)
2023–2024	→ TOP Oss (loan)	16	(0)
2025–2026	VVV-Venlo	30	(1)
2026–	Taranto	0	(0)
- * Club domestic league appearances and goals as of 28 April 2026

Joshua Eijgenraam (born 18 February 2002) is a Dutch professional footballer who plays as a defensive midfielder for Eccellenza Apulia club Taranto.

== Career ==
=== Excelsior ===
Eijgenraam was born in Berkel en Rodenrijs and progressed through the youth teams of hometown team TOGB before moving to the Excelsior academy in 2014. He made his professional debut in the Eerste Divisie appearing as a substitute against Jong AZ at Excelsior's Stadion Woudestein on 20 November 2020.

Following their promotion from the Eerste Divisie at the end of the 2021–22 season, Eijgenraam was given a new contract and an extension until 2025 as a reward for becoming a permanent fixture in the first team. He subsequently made his Eredivisie debut for Excelsior on 12 August 2022 against Cambuur at Cambuur Stadion in a 2–0 victory. During the team's return to the Eredivisie, Eijgenraam lost his starting position, featuring in 13 matches, of which only five were as a starter.

Due to reduced playing time, Eijgenraam opted for a season-long loan to TOP Oss in the Eerste Divisie, joining the club on 26 July 2023.

=== VVV-Venlo ===
On 14 May 2025, Eijgenraam joined VVV-Venlo on a two-year deal with an option for a third, the first signing of the club's squad rebuild for the 2025–26 Eerste Divisie season. He started on the opening day of the season, 8 August, in a 3–2 defeat away to De Graafschap, and scored the first senior goal of his career on 5 December, in a 2–1 win at RKC Waalwijk. He played 31 matches in what proved to be his only season at Venlo.

On 5 August 2026, with a year of his contract still to run, VVV-Venlo and Eijgenraam terminated it by mutual consent. The club said that talks had led both parties to conclude that their sporting expectations for the future no longer matched sufficiently.

=== Taranto ===
After two months without a club, Eijgenraam signed permanently for Taranto of the Italian fifth-tier Eccellenza on 2 October 2026.

== Career statistics ==
As of match played 20 March 2026

Appearances and goals by club, season and competition
Club	Season	League			KNVB Cup		Other		Total	
Club	Season	Division	Apps	Goals	Apps	Goals	Apps	Goals	Apps	Goals
Excelsior	2020–21	Eerste Divisie	1	0	0	0	—		1	0
Excelsior	2021–22	Eerste Divisie	32	0	1	0	6 (Note: Appearances in Eredivisie promotion/relegation playoffs)	0	39	0
Excelsior	2022–23	Eredivisie	13	0	2	0	—		15	0
Excelsior	2023–24	Eredivisie	0	0	0	0	—		0	0
Excelsior	2024–25	Eerste Divisie	26	0	3	0	—		29	0
Excelsior	Total		72	0	6	0	6	0	84	0
TOP Oss (loan)	2023–24	Eerste Divisie	16	0	0	0	—		16	0
VVV-Venlo	2025–26	Eerste Divisie	30	1	1	0	—		31	1
Taranto	2026–27	Eccellenza Apulia	0	0	0	0	—		0	0
Career total			118	1	7	0	6	0	131	1
