= Serano Seymor =

Dutch footballer (born 2002)

Personal information
- Date of birth: 4 January 2002 (age 24)
- Place of birth: Vlaardingen, Netherlands
- Height: 1.90 m (6 ft 3 in)
- Position: Centre-back

Team information
- Current team: Khor Fakkan
- Number: 34

Youth career
- VFC
- 2013–2021: Excelsior

Senior career*
Years	Team	Apps	(Gls)
2021–	Excelsior	46	(1)
2025–	→ VVV-Venlo (loan)	14	(0)
2025–	Khor Fakkan	10	(0)
- * Club domestic league appearances and goals as of 27 May 2026

Serano Seymor (born 4 January 2002) is a Dutch professional footballer who plays as a centre-back for Khor Fakkan.

== Career ==
Seymor was spotted by Academy head Marco van Lochem playing youth football for VFC Vlaardingen and was brought to the set up at Excelsior. He signed his a pro contract in the summer of 2022. He had made his debut on the opening weekend of the 2021–22 season as Excelsior played TOP Oss at Excelsior's Stadion Woudestein on 6 August 2021.

Following Excelsior's promotion from the Eerste Divisie at the end of the 2021–22 season, he made his Eredivisie debut on 12 August 2022 against SC Cambuur at the Cambuur Stadion in a 2–0 victory. Seymor scored his first professional league goal, netting in injury time to secure a 2–1 win for Excelsior over FC Emmen on 9 September 2022.

On 12 July 2024, Seymor extended his contract with Excelsior to 2026.

On 4 February 2025, Seymor moved on loan to VVV-Venlo.

On 22 July 2025, Seymor moved to UAE Pro League side Khor Fakkan.
