= Delano Gouda =

Dutch footballer (born 2002)

Personal information
- Date of birth: 24 January 2002 (age 24)
- Place of birth: The Hague, Netherlands
- Height: 1.92 m (6 ft 4 in)
- Position: Striker

Team information
- Current team: AFC
- Number: 28

Youth career
- HMSH
- GONA
- Excelsior

Senior career*
Years	Team	Apps	(Gls)
2020–2022	Excelsior	4	(0)
2022–2023	Jong Sparta	2	(0)
2023–2024	Scheveningen	17	(7)
2024	SG Barockstadt	5	(0)
2024–2025	Spakenburg	27	(4)
2025–	AFC	29	(19)
- * Club domestic league appearances and goals as of 30 December 2025

Delano Gouda (born 24 January 2002) is a Dutch professional footballer who plays as a striker for Tweede Divisie club AFC.

== Career ==
Gouda made his professional debut appearing as a substitute away as Excelsior Rotterdam beat TOP Oss 3–1 at their Frans Heesen Stadion on 23 January 2021. He signed for city neighbours Sparta Rotterdam on 31 May 2022.

In 2023, he signed for SVV Scheveningen. In February 2024, he moved to German fourth tier side SG Barockstadt Fulda-Lehnerz where he joined forces with fellow Dutch Clint Essers. In September 2024, Gouda returned to the Netherlands to play for Spakenburg.

== Personal life ==
In Scheveningen, he has supplemented his income by working as a plumber.
