= Luuk Admiraal =

Dutch footballer (born 2002)

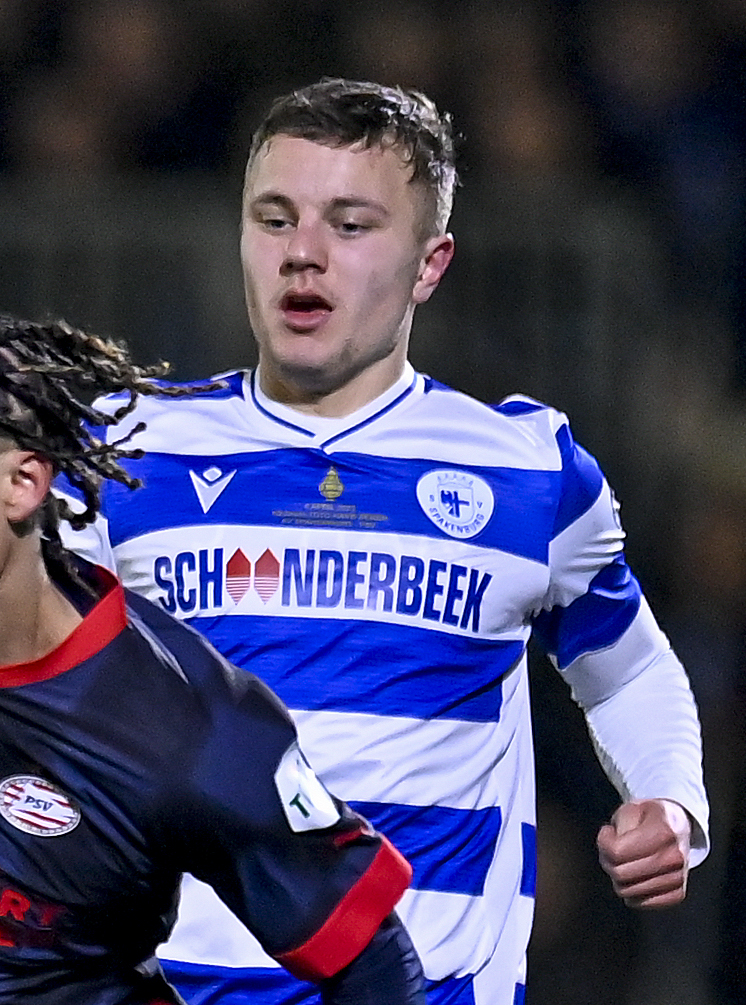
- Admiraal playing for Spakenburg in 2023

Personal information
- Date of birth: 15 March 2002 (age 24)
- Place of birth: Zwijndrecht, Netherlands
- Position: Forward

Team information
- Current team: Kloetinge
- Number: 37

Youth career
- –2020: ASWH

Senior career*
Years	Team	Apps	(Gls)
2019–2022	ASWH	18	(10)
2022–2023	Excelsior	1	(0)
2022–2023	→ Spakenburg (loan)	26	(12)
2023–2024	Jong Sparta	29	(3)
2024	Quick Boys	8	(2)
2025–2026	ASWH	33	(15)
2026–	Kloetinge	10	(4)
- * Club domestic league appearances and goals as of 4 August 2025

Luuk Admiraal (born 15 March 2002) is a Dutch footballer who plays as a forward for Tweede Divisie club Kloetinge.

== Career ==
=== Growing at ASWH ===
Admiraal played in the youth of ASWH. He made his debut in the first squad on 18 January 2020 against SV Spakenburg in the Tweede Divisie, still 17 years old. In 2021, Admiraal turned down a move to ADO Den Haag for fear of his growth being stunted without regular first-team football. He was subsequently awarded the 'Gouden Bal' (Golden Ball) award for the best player in the Tweede Divisie in 2021, despite ASWH battling relegation. While leaving mid-season, Admiraal was ASWH's top scorer for the entire 2021–22 season.

=== Excelsior and Spakenburg ===
Admiraal signed for Excelsior Rotterdam in January 2022, signing for a year. Admiraal played his first minutes for Excelsior in the promotion play-off on 29 May 2022 against ADO Den Haag, appearing as a substitute. After extra time, the match ended 4–4 and went to penalty kicks. Admiraal scored the seventh spot-kick for his new side who ultimately won the shoot-out 8–7 on sudden death, and secured promotion. Admiraal made his Eredivisie debut for Excelsior appearing as a substitute in a 3–1 victory for Excelsior against Vitesse on 12 August 2022.

On 29 August 2022, Admiraal joined SV Spakenburg in the Tweede Divisie on loan for the season. Admiraal scored 12 goals for Spakenburg.

=== Sparta, Quick Boys and ASWH ===
From 1 July 2023, Admiraal officially signed for Sparta Rotterdam, agreeing to a two-year contract with the option for two further years. He played one year for Jong Sparta and left.

In 2024, Admiraal joined Quick Boys in the Tweede Divisie. In mutual agreement, his contract was dissolved at the end of 2024. From 1 January 2025, Admiraal was back at ASWH, playing in the Derde Divisie. He signed a contract until the summer of 2026.

=== Kloetinge ===
Admiraal signed with VV Kloetinge for the 2026–27 season.
