= Redouan El Yaakoubi =

Dutch footballer (born 1996)

Personal information
- Date of birth: 25 January 1996 (age 30)
- Place of birth: Utrecht, Netherlands
- Height: 1.83 m (6 ft 0 in)
- Position: Centre-back

Youth career
- –2015: USV Elinkwijk

Senior career*
Years	Team	Apps	(Gls)
2015–2017	De Meern		
2017–2019	Jong Utrecht	46	(1)
2019–2021	Telstar	57	(0)
2021–2024	Excelsior	93	(8)
2025	RKC Waalwijk	7	(0)
- * Club domestic league appearances and goals as of 11:47, 28 May 2025 (UTC)

Redouan El Yaakoubi (born 25 January 1996) is a Dutch professional footballer who plays as a central defender.

== Club career ==
El Yaakoubi played in the youth academy of USV Elinkwijk. In 2015, he joined Hoofdklasse club VV De Meern. With De Meern, El Yaakoubi promoted to the Derde Divisie. In May 2017, after having initially decided to move to DVS '33, El Yaakoubi opted to sign for FC Utrecht led by manager Erik ten Hag. He made his Eerste Divisie debut for Jong FC Utrecht on 25 August 2017 in a game against FC Dordrecht.

After six matches for the reserve team in the Eerste Divisie, El Yaakoubi signed his first professional contract with FC Utrecht; a two-and-a-half-year deal with an option for an additional season. In July 2019, however, he signed for two years with SC Telstar.

On 6 April 2021, El Yaakoubi signed a two-year contract with Excelsior with an option for an additional season. On 28 March 2023, the club announced he had relinquished the club captaincy after refusing to pose in a team photo with a banner marking the OneLove campaign, which embraces inclusiveness, connection, tolerance and opposition to all forms of discrimination.

On 30 January 2025, El Yaakoubi signed a one-and-a-half-year contract with RKC Waalwijk.

== Personal life ==
Born in the Netherlands, El Yaakoubi is of Moroccan descent.
