= Marouan Azarkan =

Dutch footballer (born 2001)

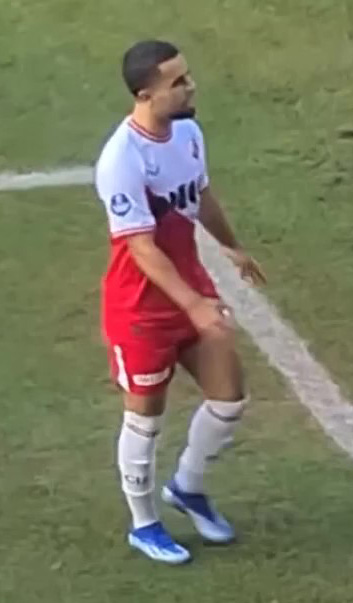
- Azarkan playing for FC Utrecht in 2023

Personal information
- Date of birth: 8 December 2001 (age 24)
- Place of birth: Rotterdam, Netherlands
- Height: 1.65 m (5 ft 5 in)
- Position: Winger

Youth career
- 2012–2020: Feyenoord

Senior career*
Years	Team	Apps	(Gls)
2019–2023	Feyenoord	2	(0)
2021	→ NAC (loan)	11	(0)
2021–2023	→ Excelsior (loan)	66	(17)
2023–2024	Utrecht	18	(0)
2024–2026	Al-Nasr	36	(5)

International career
2016–2017	Netherlands U16	6	(1)
2018	Netherlands U18	3	(2)
2019	Netherlands U19	5	(5)
- * Club domestic league appearances and goals as of 9 April 2026

Marouan Azarkan (born 8 December 2001) is a Dutch professional footballer who plays as a winger.

== Club career ==
On 2 May 2019, Azarkan signed his first professional contract with Feyenoord. He made his professional debut with Feyenoord in a 3–2 Eredivisie win over ADO Den Haag on 15 September 2019. On 10 August 2020, Feyenoord announced that the club had reached an agreement with Azarkan to extend his contract until the end of the 2022–23 season.

Azarkan was sent on a one-season loan to Excelsior on 9 August 2021. On 5 July 2022, following Excelsior's promotion to the Eredivisie, his loan was renewed for the 2022–23 season.

On 15 June 2023, it was announced that Azarkan signed with Eredivisie side FC Utrecht on a five-year deal for approximately €750.000.

== International career ==
Born in the Netherlands, Azarkan is of Moroccan descent. He is a former youth international for the Netherlands. Azarkan is eligible to appear for the Netherlands national team, and Morocco national team.

In March 2023, Azarkan accepted a call-up to the Morocco under-23 team, for the friendlies against the youth teams of Togo, Ivory Coast, and Uzbekistan. He made no appearances due to an injury sustained shortly before the friendlies.
