= Reuven Niemeijer =

Dutch footballer (born 1995)

Personal information
- Date of birth: 27 March 1995 (age 31)
- Place of birth: Hengelo, Netherlands
- Height: 1.78 m (5 ft 10 in)
- Position: Midfielder

Team information
- Current team: Volendam
- Number: 10

Youth career
- KSV BWO
- Quick '20

Senior career*
Years	Team	Apps	(Gls)
2014–2016	Quick '20		
2016–2020	Heracles Almelo	36	(11)
2018–2019	→ Emmen (loan)	19	(2)
2020–2022	Excelsior	76	(28)
2022–2023	Brescia	15	(0)
2023–2025	RKC Waalwijk	38	(2)
2025–2026	De Graafschap	49	(22)
2026–	Volendam	9	(4)
- * Club domestic league appearances and goals as of 3 October 2026

Reuven Niemeijer (born 27 March 1995) is a Dutch professional footballer who plays as a midfielder for Eerste Divisie club Volendam.

== Club career ==
Niemeijer made his professional debut in the Eredivisie for Heracles Almelo on 2 December 2016 in a game against NEC

On 1 July 2020, he moved to Excelsior.

On 1 July 2022, Niemeijer signed with Brescia in Italy.

On 17 August 2023, Niemeijer signed with RKC Waalwijk for one year, with an option for a second year.

On 31 January 2025, Niemeijer joined De Graafschap on a one-and-a-half-year contract.

On 4 August 2026, he moved to Volendam for two seasons.
