= Raphaël Eyongo =

Dutch footballer (born 2003)

Personal information
- Full name: Raphaël Bosisa Eyongo
- Date of birth: 21 May 2003 (age 23)
- Place of birth: Breda, Netherlands
- Height: 1.94 m (6 ft 4 in)
- Position: Forward

Youth career
- 2014–2015: Feyenoord
- 2015–2016: NAC
- 2016–2022: Excelsior

Senior career*
Years	Team	Apps	(Gls)
2021–2024	Excelsior	12	(0)
2024–2026	La Louvière	14	(1)
2025–2026	→ Olympic Charleroi (loan)	8	(0)
- * Club domestic league appearances and goals as of 21 January 2026

Raphaël Bosisa Eyongo (born 21 May 2003) is a Dutch retired footballer who played as a forward.

== Professional career ==
Eyongo is a youth product of Feyenoord and NAC Breda, before moving to the youth academy of Excelsior at the age of 13. He made his professional debut with Excelsior as a late substitute in a 4–2 KNVB Cup loss to Groningen on 15 December 2021. On 13 November 2022, he signed his first professional contract with the club for a 1+1year option. At the beginning of the 2023/2024 season, Eyongo struggled with an ankle injury, after his recovery he played for the Under-21 team of Excelsior. In July 2024, he made a free transfer from Excelsior to RAAL La Louvière. In June 2026, Eyongo had reportedly quit playing football.

== Personal life ==
Born in the Netherlands, Eyongo is of Congolese (DR) descent.
