= 2024–25 FC Volendam season =

Football club in the Netherlands

FC Volendam
- Full name: Football Club Volendam
- Nicknames: Palingboeren; Wijdbroeken; Het Andere Oranje; Het Nieuwe Oranje (The Other Oranje)
- Founded: 1977; 49 years ago
- Ground: Kras Stadion
- Capacity: 6,984
- Chairman: Cees Driebergen
- Head coach: Rick Kruys
- League: Eerste Divisie
- 2025–26: Eredivisie, 16th of 18 (relegated via play-offs)
- Website: https://fcvolendam.nl
| Home colours | Away colours |

This season will be the 48th season in the history of the Dutch football club FC Volendam. During this season the club will participate in the following competitions: Eerste Divisie, KNVB Cup.

== Current squad ==
As of 31 January 2025

Note: Flags indicate national team as defined under FIFA eligibility rules; some limited exceptions apply. Players may hold more than one non-FIFA nationality.

| No. | Pos. | Nation | Player |
|---|---|---|---|
| 2 | DF | NED | Daniël Beukers |
| 3 | DF | TOG | Mawouna Amevor |
| 4 | DF | NED | Xavier Mbuyamba (captain) |
| 5 | MF | CUW | Vurnon Anita |
| 6 | MF | NED | Alex Plat |
| 7 | FW | NED | Bilal Ould-Chikh |
| 8 | MF | NED | Jamie Jacobs |
| 9 | FW | NED | Henk Veerman |
| 10 | FW | CUW | Brandley Kuwas |
| 11 | FW | NED | Aurelio Oehlers |
| 12 | DF | NED | Déron Payne |
| 14 | DF | NED | Daan Steur |
| 15 | MF | NED | Anass Bouziane |
| 16 | GK | NED | Khadim Ngom |
| 18 | MF | NED | Nordin Bukala |

| No. | Pos. | Nation | Player |
|---|---|---|---|
| 19 | MF | NED | Myron Mau-Asam |
| 20 | GK | NED | Kayne van Oevelen |
| 21 | FW | NED | Robert Mühren |
| 22 | GK | NED | Barry Lauwers |
| 23 | DF | NED | Gladwin Curiel |
| 25 | DF | NED | Luca Blondeau |
| 26 | FW | CPV | Jerson Cabral |
| 28 | MF | SUR | Silvinho Esajas |
| 32 | DF | SUR | Yannick Leliendal |
| 34 | MF | MAR | Imran Nazih |
| 36 | MF | NED | Milan de Haan |
| 39 | FW | IDN | Mauro Zijlstra |
| 46 | MF | NED | Mika van der Horst |
| 77 | FW | NED | Caner Demircioglu |

=== Out on loan ===
Note: Flags indicate national team as defined under FIFA eligibility rules; some limited exceptions apply. Players may hold more than one non-FIFA nationality.

| No. | Pos. | Nation | Player |
|---|---|---|---|
| — | MF | NED | Flip Klomp (at Spakenburg until 30 June 2025) |
| — | MF | NED | Bram van Driel (at Lecce U19 until 30 June 2025) |

| No. | Pos. | Nation | Player |
|---|---|---|---|
| — | FW | BOE | Quincy Hoeve (at Jong Sparta until 30 June 2025) |

== Non-competitive ==
=== Club Friendlies ===
| 6 July 2024 Friendly | MSV Duisburg (Germany) | 0–0 | (Netherlands) Volendam | Wissel |
| 13:00 | | Report | | Stadium: Sportpark Ericaweg Epe |

| 12 July 2024 Friendly | Volendam (Netherlands) | 5–0 | (Netherlands) Noordwijk | Volendam |
| 20:00 CET | Mühren 28'; Veerman 32', 36'; Blommestijn 72'; Steur 82' | Report | | Stadium: Kras Stadion |

| 17 July 2024 Friendly | Volendam (Netherlands) | 1–0 | (Qatar) Al-Shamal | Cuijk |
| 16:00 CET | Hoeve 2' | Report | | Stadium: Gemeentelijk Sportpark De Groenendijkse Kampen |

== Competitive ==
=== Eerste Divisie ===
==== League Table ====
| Pos | Team | Pld | W | D | L | GF | GA | GD | Pts | Promotion or qualification |
|---|---|---|---|---|---|---|---|---|---|---|
| 1 | Volendam (Note: Winner of the Second Period (Rounds 10–19)) (C, P) | 38 | 26 | 4 | 8 | 87 | 48 | +39 | 82 | Promotion to the Eredivisie |
| 2 | Excelsior (Note: Winner of the Fourth Period (Rounds 30–38)) (P) | 38 | 22 | 8 | 8 | 74 | 38 | +36 | 74 | Promotion to the Eredivisie |
| 3 | Cambuur | 38 | 22 | 5 | 11 | 63 | 42 | +21 | 71 | Qualification for promotion play-offs |
| 4 | ADO Den Haag (Note: Winner of the Third Period (Rounds 20–29)) | 38 | 20 | 10 | 8 | 69 | 47 | +22 | 70 | Qualification for promotion play-offs |
| 5 | Dordrecht | 38 | 20 | 8 | 10 | 69 | 46 | +23 | 68 | Qualification for promotion play-offs |

Source: Flashscore, Keuken Kampioen Divisie (in Dutch)
Rules for classification: Season in progress: 1) Most points won; 2) Less points lost; 3) Goal difference; 4) Goals scored; 5) Alphabetical order; End of season: 1) Points; 2) Goal difference; 3) Goals scored; 4) Head-to-head points; 5) Head-to-head goal difference; 6) Head-to-head away goals scored; 7) Play-off if relevant for deciding champion, relegation or participating in a European league, otherwise by draw. 8) Penalty shoot-out (only after a play-off)
(C) Champions; (P) Promoted

==== Results summary ====
| Overall | | | | | | | | Home | | | | | | Away | | | | | |
| Pld | W | D | L | GF | GA | GD | Pts | W | D | L | GF | GA | GD | W | D | L | GF | GA | GD |
|---|---|---|---|---|---|---|---|---|---|---|---|---|---|---|---|---|---|---|---|
| 0 | 0 | 0 | 0 | 0 | 0 | 0 | 0 | 0 | 0 | 0 | 0 | 0 | 0 | 0 | 0 | 0 | 0 | 0 | 0 |

===== Results by round =====
| Round | 1 |
|---|---|
| Ground | |
| Result | |
| Position | |

A = Away; H = Home; W = Win; D = Draw; L = Loss
