= 2023–24 FC Volendam season =

FC Volendam
2023–24 season
- Chairman: Piet Kemper
- Manager: Matthias Kohler
- Stadium: Kras Stadion
- Eredivisie: 17th (relegated)
- KNVB Cup: First round
- Top goalscorer: League: Robert Muhren (8); All: Robert Muhren (8)
Home colours	Away colours

The 2023–24 season was FC Volendam's 47th season in existence and second consecutive in the Eredivisie. They also competed in the KNVB Cup, being eliminated from the first round.

== Players ==
=== First-team squad ===
As of 31 July 2023

Note: Flags indicate national team as defined under FIFA eligibility rules; some limited exceptions apply. Players may hold more than one non-FIFA nationality.

No.	Pos.	Nation	Player
1	GK	GER	Mio Backhaus (on loan from Werder Bremen)
2	DF	DEN	Oskar Buur
3	DF	NED	Brian Plat
4	DF	NED	Damon Mirani
6	DF	MAR	Benaissa Benamar
7	MF	USA	Zach Booth (on loan from Leicester City)
11	MF	NED	Bilal Ould-Chikh
14	FW	AUS	Garang Kuol (on loan from Newcastle United)
16	MF	NED	Imran Nazih
17	MF	NED	Calvin Twigt
18	MF	BRA	Diego Gustavo
19	FW	NED	Koen Blommestijn
20	GK	NED	Kayne van Oevelen
21	FW	NED	Robert Mühren
22	GK	NED	Barry Lauwers

No.	Pos.	Nation	Player
23	DF	NED	Billy van Duijl
24	DF	NED	Achraf Douiri
25	FW	NED	Lequincio Zeefuik
26	DF	NED	Déron Payne
27	FW	BOE	Quincy Hoeve
28	DF	ENG	Josh Flint
30	MF	NED	Flip Klomp
31	DF	NED	Xavier Mbuyamba
34	FW	MAR	Ibrahim El Kadiri
35	DF	DOM	Francisco Reyes Marizán
37	MF	NED	Joey Antonioli
38	FW	GRN	Darius Johnson
—	MF	RSA	Luke Le Roux
—	DF	ENG	George Cox

=== Out on loan ===
Note: Flags indicate national team as defined under FIFA eligibility rules; some limited exceptions apply. Players may hold more than one non-FIFA nationality.

No. / Pos. / Nation / Player; — / DF / NED / Walid Ould-Chikh (at Roda JC until 30 June 2024)	No. / Pos. / Nation / Player; — / FW / NED / Henk Veerman (at ADO Den Haag until 30 June 2024)

== Transfers ==
=== In ===
Pos.	Player	Transferred from	Fee	Date	Source
GK	(Germany) Mio Backhaus	(Germany) Werder Bremen	Loan	5 July 2023	
MF	(Australia) Garang Kuol	(England) Newcastle United	Loan	8 August 2023	
DF	(England) George Cox	Unattached	Free	18 September 2023	

=== Out ===
Pos.	Player	Transferred to	Fee	Date	Source
MF	(Netherlands) Walid Ould-Chikh	(Netherlands) Roda JC Kerkrade	Loan	7 July 2023	
DF	(Netherlands) Dean James	(Netherlands) Go Ahead Eagles	Free	18 July 2023	
FW	(Netherlands) Henk Veerman	(Netherlands) ADO Den Haag	Loan	29 July 2023	

== Pre-season and friendlies ==
Win Draw Loss Fixtures

15 July 2023 Friendly	Volendam (Netherlands)	1–2	(Belgium) Gent	Alkmaar
13:30 UTC+2	Fiemawhle 87'		Cuypers 22'; Hjulsager 44'	Stadium: Sportpark Overdie

22 July 2023 Friendly	Kortrijk (Belgium)	2–1	(Netherlands) Volendam
	Bruno 24'; Mbayo 77'		Mühren 5' (pen.)

29 July 2023 Friendly	Volendam (Netherlands)	2–0	(Greece) Lamia	Volendam
15:30 UTC+2	Fiemawhle 74'; Zeefuik 89'			Stadium: Kras Stadion

1 August 2023 Friendly	Volendam (Netherlands)	1–1	(Turkey) Alanyaspor	Alkmaar
18:30 UTC+2	Twigt 11'		Karaca 33' (pen.)	Stadium: Sportpark Overdie

5 August 2023 Friendly	Heracles Almelo (Netherlands)	1–3	(Netherlands) Volendam	Almelo
14:30 UTC+2	Hornkamp 41'		Mühren 26'; Eiting 32'; Nazih 46'	Stadium: Erve Asito

5 January 2024 Friendly	Volendam (Netherlands)	1–1	(Albania) FK Partizani	Belek
13:00 UTC+1	Booth 73'	Report	Bircay 68'	Stadium: Calista Sports Center

8 January 2024 Friendly	Volendam (Netherlands)	2–0	(Switzerland) Winterthur	Belek
	Twigt 65'; de Haan 85'	Report		Stadium: Calista Sports Center - Field A

== Competitions ==
=== Overall record ===
Competition	First match	Last match	Starting round	Final position	Record							
Competition	First match	Last match	Starting round	Final position	Pld	W	D	L	GF	GA	GD	Win %
Eredivisie	11 August 2023	19 May 2024	Matchday 1	17th	32	4	7	21	31	79	−48	12.50
KNVB Cup	16 November 2023	16 November 2023	First round	First round	1	0	0	1	0	1	−1	0.00
Total					33	4	7	22	31	80	−49	12.12

Last updated: 5 May 2024
Source: Soccerway

=== Eredivisie ===
==== League table ====
Pos	Team	Pld	W	D	L	GF	GA	GD	Pts	Qualification or relegation
14	Heracles Almelo	34	9	6	19	41	74	−33	33	
15	RKC Waalwijk	34	7	8	19	38	56	−18	29	
16	Excelsior (R)	34	6	11	17	50	73	−23	29	Qualification for the Relegation play-off
17	Volendam (R)	34	4	7	23	34	88	−54	19	Relegation to Eerste Divisie
18	Vitesse (Note: Vitesse were deducted eighteen points for breaking the license requirements set by the Royal Dutch Football Association.) (R)	34	6	6	22	30	74	−44	6	Relegation to Eerste Divisie

Source: Eredivisie
Rules for classification: Season in progress: 1) Most points won; 2) Less points lost; 3) Goal difference; 4) Goals scored; 5) Alphabetical order; End of season: 1) Points; 2) Goal difference; 3) Goals scored; 4) Head-to-head points; 5) Head-to-head goal difference; 6) Head-to-head away goals scored; 7) Play-off if relevant for deciding champion, relegation or participating in a European league, otherwise by draw. 8) Penalty shoot-out (only after a play-off)
(R) Relegated

==== Results summary ====
Overall								Home						Away					
Pld	W	D	L	GF	GA	GD	Pts	W	D	L	GF	GA	GD	W	D	L	GF	GA	GD
32	4	7	21	31	79	−48	19	3	2	11	15	42	−27	1	5	10	16	37	−21

Last updated: 5 May 2024.

==== Results by round ====
Round	1	2	3	4	5	6	7	8	9	10	11	12	13	14	15	16	17	18	19
Ground	H	A	A	H	A	H	A	H	A	H	A	H	A	H	A	A	H	A	H
Result	L	L	L	L	L	D	L	W	L	W	D	L	L	L	L	W	L		
Position	12	16	16	15	18	18	18	17	18	17	17	18	18	18	18	17	18		

Updated to match(es) played on 5 May 2024. Source:
A = Away; H = Home; W = Win; D = Draw; L = Loss

==== Matches ====
The league fixtures were unveiled on 30 June 2023.

11 August 2023 1	Volendam	1–2	Vitesse	Volendam
20:00 CEST (UTC+2)	Mühren 10', (red card) 45+1'; Murkin (yellow card) 38'; Ould-Chikh (yellow card) 78'	Report	Tielemans 60', (yellow card) 78'; Van Ginkel 86'; Plat (yellow card) 90+3'	Stadium: Kras Stadion; Referee: Dennis Higler

19 August 2023 2	Go Ahead Eagles	4–1	Volendam	Deventer
21:00 CEST (UTC+2)	Kuipers 13'; Edvardsen 36'; Willumsson 40'; Adekanye (red card) 45'; Kramer (yellow card) 84'; Rommens 86'	Report	Zeefuik (yellow card) 56'; Van Mieghem 61'; Payne (yellow card) 84'; Hoeve (yellow card) 90'	Stadium: De Adelaarshorst; Referee: Edwin van de Graaf

3 September 2023 4	Volendam	0–2	Twente	Volendam
14:30 CEST (UTC+2)	Benamar (yellow card) 75'; Backhaus (yellow card) 76'	Report	Steijn 36'; Kjølø (yellow card) 41'; Rots (yellow card) 74'; van Wolfswinkel 79'	Stadium: Kras Stadion; Attendance: 6,600; Referee: (Netherlands) Richard Martens

16 September 2023 5	Fortuna Sittard	3–1	Volendam	Sittard
20:00 CEST (UTC+2)	Dijks (yellow card) 16'; Özyakup 59'; Noslin 66'; Halilović 89'	Report	Kuol 40'	Stadium: Fortuna Sittard Stadion; Attendance: 9,238; Referee: (Netherlands) Jochem Kamphuis

23 September 2023 6	Volendam	2–2	Heracles Almelo	Volendam
16:30 CEST (UTC+2)	Kuol (yellow card) 31'; Benamar 71'; Mühren 87'	Report	De Keersmaecker (yellow card) 45+1' (goal) 51'; Hansson 57'	Stadium: Kras Stadion; Attendance: 6,600; Referee: (Netherlands) Ingmar Oostrom

30 September 2023 7	PSV Eindhoven	3–1	Volendam	Eindhoven
18:45 CEST (UTC+2)	Lang 12'; Til 47'; Pepi (yellow card) 79'; Tillman 90+6'	Report	Benamar (yellow card) 63' (yellow-red card) 88'; Twigt 76' (pen.)	Stadium: Philips Stadion; Attendance: 34,000; Referee: (Netherlands) Allard Lindhout

6 October 2023 8	Volendam	1–0	FC Utrecht	Volendam
20:00 CEST (UTC+2)	Twigt (yellow card) 35'; Mühren 57'; Douiri (yellow card) 83'; Ould-Chikh (yellow card) 90+4'	Report	Viergever (red card) 5'; Lidberg (yellow card) 20'; Fraulo (yellow card) 20'	Stadium: Kras Stadion; Attendance: 6,525; Referee: (Netherlands) Serdar Gözübüyük

21 October 2023 9	RKC Waalwijk	2–1	Volendam	Waalwijk
18:45 CEST (UTC+2)	Min 43'; Meijers (yellow card) 52'; Roemeratoe (yellow card) 76'; Oukili 90+2'; Kramer (yellow card) 90+3'	Report	Mbuyamba (yellow card) 28'; Payne (yellow card) 45+1'; Benamar 89'	Stadium: Mandemakers Stadion; Attendance: 6,188; Referee: (Netherlands) Edwin van de Graaf

29 October 2023 10	Volendam	3–1	Excelsior	Volendam
14:30 CEST (UTC+2)	Benamar 53'; Mühren 57'; Milan de Haan 71'; Ould-Chikh (yellow card) 76'	Report	Driouech 33'; Parrott (yellow card) 70'; Horemans (yellow card) 89'	Stadium: Kras Stadion; Attendance: 6,500; Referee: (Netherlands) Alex Bos

2 November 2023 3	AFC Ajax	2–0	Volendam	Amsterdam
20:00 CET (UTC+1)	Bergwijn 57'; Akpom 89'	Report	Twigt (yellow card) 85'	Stadium: Johan Cruyff Arena (roof closed); Attendance: 54,177; Referee: Martin van den Kerkhof
Note: The match was originally scheduled for 3 September 2023, but was postponed due to Ajax playing in the 2023–24 UEFA Europa League play-off round and rescheduled for 27 September. The postponement was extended following the rescheduling of the postponed Ajax v Feyenoord match.

5 November 2023 11	NEC	3–3	Volendam	Nijmegen
14:30 CET (UTC+1)	Ogawa 6' 90+8'; Tavşan (yellow card) 8' (yellow-red card) 38'; Mattsson (yellow card) 41' (goal) 90+1' (pen.); Schöne (yellow card) 86'	Report	Mühren 34'; Milan de Haan 78'; Twigt (yellow card) 87' (goal) 90+6'; Backhaus (yellow card) 90'	Stadium: Goffertstadion; Attendance: 12,500; Referee: (Netherlands) Jochem Kamphuis

12 November 2023 12	Volendam	1–4	Sparta Rotterdam	Volendam
14:30 CET (UTC+1)	Milan de Haan 13'	Report	Vriends 6' 87'; Velthuis (yellow card) 37'; Kitolano 42'; Verschueren 90+1'	Stadium: Kras Stadion; Attendance: 6,784; Referee: (Netherlands) Richard Martens

26 November 2023 13	AZ	3–0	Volendam	Alkmaar
14:30 CET (UTC+1)	van Bommel 5'; Pavlidis 48'; Martens Indi 57'	Report		Stadium: AFAS Stadion; Attendance: 18,261; Referee: (Netherlands) Bas Nijhuis

2 December 2023 14	Volendam	0–5	PEC Zwolle	Volendam
18:45 CET (UTC+1)	Twigt (yellow card) 71'; Zeefuik (yellow card) 88'	Report	Velanas 59'; Druijf 62' 67' 87'; Thy 82'	Stadium: Kras Stadion; Attendance: 6,800; Referee: (Netherlands) Dennis Higler

7 December 2023 15	Feyenoord	3–1	Volendam	Rotterdam
21:00 CET (UTC+1)	Timber 13'; Igor Paixão (yellow card) 76' (goal) 90+6'; Giménez 90+4'	Report	Zeefuik 31'; Backhaus (yellow card) 90'	Stadium: Stadion Feijenoord; Attendance: 40,000; Referee: (Netherlands) Martin van den Kerkhof

16 December 2023 16	Heerenveen	1–2	Volendam	Heerenveen
21:00 CET (UTC+1)	Nicolaescu 65'; Olsson (yellow card) 76'	Report	Ould-Chikh 28'; Milan de Haan (yellow card) 46'; Zeefuik 51'; Hoeve (yellow card) 90+7'	Stadium: Abe Lenstra Stadion; Attendance: 21,800; Referee: (Netherlands) Allard Lindhout

14 January 2024 17	Volendam	0–1	Almere City	Volendam
12:15 CET (UTC+1)	Cox (yellow card) 78'	Report	Robinet 12'; Floranus (yellow card) 78'	Stadium: Kras Stadion; Attendance: 6,738; Referee: Ingmar Oostrom

5 May 2024 32	Volendam	1–4	Ajax	Volendam
14:30 CEST (UTC+2)		Report		Stadium: Kras Stadion; Referee: Alex Bos

12 May 2024 33	FC Twente	v	Volendam	Enschede
14:30 CEST (UTC+2)

19 May 2024 34	Volendam	v	Go Ahead Eagles	Volendam
14:30 CEST (UTC+2)		Report		Stadium: Kras Stadion

=== KNVB Cup ===
16 November 2023	Excelsior Maassluis	1–0	Volendam	Maassluis
20:00 CET	Ouali 20'	Report		Stadium: Sportpark Dijkpolder
