= 2022–23 FC Volendam season =

Volendam
2022–23 season
- Chairman: Piet Kemper
- Manager: Wim Jonk
- Stadium: Kras Stadion
- Eredivisie: 14th
- KNVB Cup: Second round
- Biggest win: Harkemase Boys 1–5 Volendam
- Biggest defeat: PSV 7–1 Volendam

The 2022–23 season was FC Volendam's 46th season in existence and the club's first season back in the top flight of Dutch football since 2009. In addition to the domestic league, FC Volendam participated in this season's edition of the KNVB Cup.

== Players ==
=== First-team squad ===
As of 24 January 2023

Note: Flags indicate national team as defined under FIFA eligibility rules; some limited exceptions apply. Players may hold more than one non-FIFA nationality.

No.	Pos.	Nation	Player
1	GK	SRB	Filip Stanković (on loan from Inter Milan)
2	DF	DEN	Oskar Buur
3	DF	NED	Brian Plat
4	DF	NED	Damon Mirani
5	DF	ENG	Derry Murkin
6	DF	MAR	Benaissa Benamar
7	FW	NED	Daryl van Mieghem
8	MF	NED	Carel Eiting (Captain)
9	FW	NED	Henk Veerman
10	MF	ITA	Gaetano Oristanio (on loan from Inter Milan)
11	MF	NED	Bilal Ould-Chikh
12	MF	FRA	Florent Da Silva (on loan from Lyon)
15	DF	NED	Dean James
16	MF	NED	Imran Nazih
17	MF	NED	Calvin Twigt
18	MF	BRA	Diego Gustavo

No.	Pos.	Nation	Player
19	MF	BEL	Francesco Antonucci (on loan from Feyenoord)
20	GK	NED	Kayne van Oevelen
21	FW	NED	Robert Mühren
22	GK	NED	Barry Lauwers
23	DF	NED	Billy van Duijl
24	DF	NED	Achraf Douiri
25	FW	NED	Lequincio Zeefuik
26	DF	NED	Déron Payne
27	DF	NED	Givairo Read
28	DF	ENG	Josh Flint
30	MF	NED	Flip Klomp
31	DF	NED	Xavier Mbuyamba
33	DF	NED	Walid Ould-Chikh
34	FW	MAR	Ibrahim El Kadiri
36	FW	NED	Jordi Blom
37	MF	NED	Joey Antonioli

=== On loan ===
Note: Flags indicate national team as defined under FIFA eligibility rules; some limited exceptions apply. Players may hold more than one non-FIFA nationality.

No.	Pos.	Nation	Player
—	FW	NED	Koen Blommestijn (at Telstar until 30 June 2023)

== Pre-season and friendlies ==
Win Draw Loss

9 July 2022 Friendly	Volendam (Netherlands)	3–2	(Belgium) Genk	Alkmaar, Netherlands
14:30 CEST (UTC+2)	Van Mieghem 12'; El Kadiri 41'; Ould-Chikh 54'		Cuesta 79'; Németh 90+2'	Stadium: Sportpark Overdie

15 July 2022 Friendly	NAC Breda (Netherlands)	0–0	(Netherlands) Volendam	Breda
19:00 CEST (UTC+2)				Stadium: Sportpark Tussen de Leyen Veld 2

7 December 2022 Friendly	Ajax (Netherlands)	5−4	(Netherlands) Volendam	Duivendrecht, Netherlands
12:00 CET (UTC+1)	Hato 56'; Conceição 58', 69'; Brobbey 65', 89'		Oristanio 7'; Antonioli 46', 74'; Plat 48'	Stadium: Sportpark De Toekomst; Attendance: Behind closed doors

15 December 2022 Friendly	Sevilla (Spain)	7–0	(Netherlands) Volendam	Seville
18:30 CET (UTC+1)	Gudelj 6', 41'; Mir 21', 42'; Fernando (yellow card) 34'; Álvarez 37'; Quintana 85', 90+2'			Stadium: Estadio Jesús Navas; Attendance: 0 Referee: Juan Antonio Manrique Antequera (Spain)

30 December 2022 Friendly	Volendam (Netherlands)	4–1	(Netherlands) NAC Breda	Volendam
13:00 CET (UTC+1)				Stadium: Kras Stadion

== Competitions ==
=== Overview ===
Competition	First match	Last match	Starting round	Final position	Record							
Competition	First match	Last match	Starting round	Final position	Pld	W	D	L	GF	GA	GD	Win %
Eredivisie	7 August 2022	28 May 2023	Matchday 1	14th	34	10	6	18	42	71	−29	29.41
KNVB Cup	18 October 2022	11 January 2023	First round	Second round	2	1	0	1	5	3	+2	50.00
Total					36	11	6	19	47	74	−27	30.56

Source: Soccerway

=== Eredivisie ===
==== League table ====
Pos	Team	Pld	W	D	L	GF	GA	GD	Pts	Qualification or relegation
12	NEC	34	8	15	11	42	45	−3	39	
13	Fortuna Sittard	34	10	6	18	39	62	−23	36	
14	Volendam	34	10	6	18	42	71	−29	36	
15	Excelsior	34	9	5	20	32	71	−39	32	
16	Emmen (R)	34	6	10	18	33	65	−32	28	Qualification to Relegation play-offs

Source: Eredivisie
Rules for classification: Season in progress: 1) Most points won; 2) Less points lost; 3) Goal difference; 4) Goals scored; 5) Alphabetical order; End of season: 1) Points; 2) Goal difference; 3) Goals scored; 4) Head-to-head points; 5) Head-to-head goal difference; 6) Head-to-head away goals scored; 7) Play-off if relevant for deciding champion, relegation or participating in a European league, otherwise by draw. 8) Penalty shoot-out (only after a play-off)
(R) Relegated

==== Results summary ====
Overall								Home						Away					
Pld	W	D	L	GF	GA	GD	Pts	W	D	L	GF	GA	GD	W	D	L	GF	GA	GD
34	10	6	18	42	71	−29	36	9	1	7	29	32	−3	1	5	11	13	39	−26

==== Results by round ====
Round	1	2	3	4	5	6	7	8	9	10	11	12	13	14	15	16	17	18	19	20	21	22	23	24	25	26	27	28	29	30	31	32	33	34
Ground	A	H	A	H	A	H	A	A	H	A	H	A	H	H	A	H	A	A	H	H	A	H	A	H	A	H	A	A	H	H	A	H	A	H
Result	D	L	L	W	L	L	D	L	L	D	L	L	L	L	W	W	L	D	W	D	L	W	L	W	L	W	D	L	L	W	L	W	L	W
Position																																		

A = Away; H = Home; W = Win; D = Draw; L = Loss

==== Matches ====
The league fixtures were announced on 17 June 2022.

7 August 2022 1	Groningen	2–2	Volendam	Groningen
CEST (UTC+2)				Stadium: Euroborg

14 August 2022 2	Volendam	1–4	NEC	Volendam
CEST (UTC+2)				Stadium: Kras Stadion

28 August 2022 4	Volendam	1–0	Twente	Volendam
CEST (UTC+2)				Stadium: Kras Stadion

31 August 2022 3	PSV	7–1	Volendam	Eindhoven
CEST (UTC+2)				Stadium: Philips Stadion

3 September 2022 5	Sparta Rotterdam	4–0	Volendam	Rotterdam
CEST (UTC+2)				Stadium: Sparta Stadion Het Kasteel

9 September 2022 6	Volendam	2–3	Go Ahead Eagles	Volendam
CEST (UTC+2)				Stadium: Kras Stadion

17 September 2022 7	Vitesse	1–1	Volendam	Arnhem
CEST (UTC+2)				Stadium: GelreDome

2 October 2022 8	Fortuna Sittard	2–0	Volendam	Sittard
CEST (UTC+2)				Stadium: Fortuna Sittard Stadion

8 October 2022 9	Volendam	2–4	Ajax	Volendam
CEST (UTC+2)				Stadium: Kras Stadion

14 October 2022 10	Emmen	1–1	Volendam	Emmen
CEST (UTC+2)				Stadium: De Oude Meerdijk

23 October 2022 11	Volendam	1–3	Heerenveen	Volendam
CEST (UTC+2)				Stadium: Kras Stadion

30 October 2022 12	AZ	2–1	Volendam	Alkmaar
CEST (UTC+2)				Stadium: AFAS Stadion

6 November 2022 13	Volendam	0–2	Feyenoord	Volendam
CET (UTC+1)				Stadium: Kras Stadion

12 November 2022 14	Volendam	0–4	Utrecht	Volendam
CET (UTC+1)				Stadium: Kras Stadion

8 January 2023 15	SC Cambuur	0–3	Volendam	Leeuwarden
CET (UTC+1)				Stadium: Cambuur Stadion

14 January 2023 16	Volendam	2–1	RKC Waalwijk	Volendam
CET (UTC+1)				Stadium: Kras Stadion

20 January 2023 17	Excelsior	2–0	Volendam	Rotterdam
CET (UTC+1)				Stadium: Van Donge & De Roo Stadion

26 January 2023 18	Ajax	1–1	Volendam	Amsterdam
CET (UTC+1)				Stadium: Johan Cruyff Arena

29 January 2023 19	Volendam	3–2	Groningen	Volendam
CET (UTC+1)				Stadium: Kras Stadion

4 February 2023 20	Volendam	1–1	AZ	Volendam
CET (UTC+1)				Stadium: Kras Stadion

12 February 2023 21	Twente	3–0	Volendam	Enschede
CET (UTC+1)				Stadium: De Grolsch Veste

18 February 2023 22	Volendam	2–0	Vitesse	Volendam
CET (UTC+1)				Stadium: Kras Stadion

25 February 2023 23	NEC	3–0	Volendam	Nijmegen
CET (UTC+1)				Stadium: Goffertstadion

4 March 2023 24	Volendam	3–1	Emmen	Volendam
CET (UTC+1)				Stadium: Kras Stadion

12 March 2023 25	Feyenoord	2–1	Volendam	Rotterdam
CET (UTC+1)				Stadium: De Kuip

17 March 2023 26	Volendam	2–1	Fortuna Sittard	Volendam
CET (UTC+1)				Stadium: Kras Stadion

2 April 2023 27	Utrecht	0–0	Volendam	Utrecht
CEST (UTC+2)				Stadium: Stadion Galgenwaard

8 April 2023 28	Heerenveen	2–1	Volendam	Heerenveen
CEST (UTC+2)				Stadium: Abe Lenstra Stadion

16 April 2023 29	Volendam	2–3	PSV	Volendam
CEST (UTC+2)				Stadium: Kras Stadion

21 April 2023 30	Volendam	2–0	Cambuur	Volendam
CEST (UTC+2)				Stadium: Kras Stadion

5 May 2023 31	RKC Waalwijk	4–1	Volendam	Waalwijk
20:00 CEST (UTC+2)	Oukili 3'; Jozefzoon 35'; Seuntjens 49'; Lobete 88'	Report	Antonucci 52'	Stadium: Mandemakers Stadion; Referee: Bas Nijhuis

13 May 2023 32	Volendam	2–1	Sparta Rotterdam	Volendam
18:45 CEST (UTC+2)	Mbuyamba 37', 90+1'	Report	Saito 5'	Stadium: Kras Stadion; Referee: Jannick van der Laan

21 May 2023 33	Go Ahead Eagles	3–0	Volendam	Deventer
14:30 CEST (UTC+2)	Willumsson (penalty missed) 2'; Lidberg 45'; Edvardsen 51'; Álvarez 65'	Report		Stadium: De Adelaarshorst; Referee: Danny Makkelie

28 May 2023 34	Volendam	3–2	Excelsior	Volendam
14:30 CEST (UTC+2)	Van Mieghem 10'; Van Gassel 23' (o.g.); Antonucci 27'	Report	Lamprou 56'; Agrafiotis 78'; Kharchouch (penalty missed) 90'	Stadium: Kras Stadion; Referee: Jochem Kamphuis

==== KNVB Cup ====
18 October 2022 First round	Harkemase Boys	1–5	Volendam	Harkema
20:00 CEST (UTC+2)	Margharita 32'	Report	16' Nazih; 43' Mühren; 66', 81' El Kadiri; 76' Zeefuik	Stadium: De Bosk

11 January 2023 Second round	Heerenveen	2–0	Volendam	Heerenveen
20:00 CET (UTC+1)	Van Amersfoort 48'; Van Hooijdonk 74'	Report		Stadium: Abe Lenstra Stadion; Referee: Ingmar Oostrom
