= Vlak =

Vlak is a surname found in Croatia and in the Netherlands. Notable people with the surname include:

- Dion Vlak (born 2001), Dutch footballer
- Gerry Vlak (born 1996), Dutch footballer
- Jari Vlak (born 1998), Dutch footballer
- Marijan Vlak (born 1955), Croatian football player and manager
