= 2023–24 FC Emmen season =

FC Emmen
2023–24 season
- President: Ronald Lubbers
- Manager: Fred Grim
- Stadium: De Oude Meerdijk
- Eerste Divisie: 7th
- KNVB Cup: First round
- Top goalscorer: League: Piotr Parzyszek (9); All: Piotr Parzyszek (10)
- Average home league attendance: 7,427
- All statistics correct as of 10 May 2024.

The 2023–24 season was FC Emmen's 99th season in existence and first one back in the Eerste Divisie. They also competed in the KNVB Cup.

== Players ==
=== First-team squad ===
As of 26 August 2023

Note: Flags indicate national team as defined under FIFA eligibility rules; some limited exceptions apply. Players may hold more than one non-FIFA nationality.

No.	Pos.	Nation	Player
1	GK	GER	Eric Oelschlägel
3	DF	NED	Jeff Hardeveld
4	DF	NED	Mike te Wierik
6	MF	NED	Maikel Kieftenbeld
7	FW	POR	Rui Mendes
8	MF	FRA	Lucas Bernadou
9	FW	POL	Piotr Parzyszek
11	FW	NED	Chardi Landu
13	DF	BEL	Michaël Heylen
14	DF	NED	Dennis Vos
16	GK	NED	Kyan van Dorp

No.	Pos.	Nation	Player
18	DF	NED	Lorenzo Burnet
19	FW	NED	Ben Scholte
20	MF	NED	Jari Vlak
21	FW	NED	Patrick Brouwer (on loan from Sparta Rotterdam)
22	GK	NED	Jan Hoekstra
23	MF	MAR	Ahmed El Messaoudi
24	DF	NED	Julius Dirksen
—	DF	NED	Robin Schouten
—	MF	NED	Jorrit Smeets
—	MF	NED	Desley Ubbink
—	FW	NED	Joey Konings

== Transfers ==
=== In ===
Pos.	Player	Transferred from	Fee	Date	Source

=== Out ===
Pos.	Player	Transferred to	Fee	Date	Source

== Pre-season and friendlies ==
Win Draw Loss Fixtures

14 July 2023 Friendly	VfL Osnabrück (Germany)	5–0	(Netherlands) Emmen
16:00 CEST (UTC+2)
Note: Match was played in four periods of thirty minutes each.

19 July 2023 Friendly	Deinze (Belgium)	2–0	(Netherlands) Emmen
15:00 CEST (UTC+2)

22 July 2023 Friendly	PEC Zwolle (Netherlands)	1–2	(Netherlands) Emmen
13:00 CEST (UTC+2)
Note: Match was played in two periods of thirty minutes each.

25 July 2023 Friendly	Heracles Almelo (Netherlands)	1–0	(Netherlands) Emmen
19:00 CEST (UTC+2)

29 July 2023 Friendly	Groningen (Netherlands)	1–1	(Netherlands) Emmen
15:00 CEST (UTC+2)

4 August 2023 Friendly	Emmen (Netherlands)	2–3	(Netherlands) TOP Oss
14:00 CEST (UTC+2)
Note: Match was played in two 45-minute periods plus a 30-minute period.

== Competitions ==
=== Overall record ===
Competition	First match	Last match	Starting round	Record							
Competition	First match	Last match	Starting round	Pld	W	D	L	GF	GA	GD	Win %
Eerste Divisie	11 August 2023	10 May 2024	Matchday 1	7	3	3	1	15	12	+3	42.86
KNVB Cup	31 October–2 November 2023		First round	0	0	0	0	0	0	+0	—
Total				7	3	3	1	15	12	+3	42.86

Last updated: 22 September 2023
Source: Soccerway

=== Eerste Divisie ===
==== League table ====
Pos	Team	Pld	W	D	L	GF	GA	GD	Pts	Promotion or qualification
5	ADO Den Haag	38	17	12	9	72	50	+22	63	Qualification for promotion play-offs
6	De Graafschap	38	19	6	13	61	52	+9	63	Qualification for promotion play-offs
7	Emmen	38	17	6	15	59	60	−1	57	Qualification for promotion play-offs
8	NAC Breda (O, P)	38	15	11	12	63	56	+7	56	Qualification for promotion play-offs
9	MVV Maastricht	38	16	8	14	64	60	+4	56	

Source: Flashscore, Keuken Kampioen Divisie (in Dutch)
Rules for classification: Season in progress: 1) Most points won; 2) Less points lost; 3) Goal difference; 4) Goals scored; 5) Alphabetical order; End of season: 1) Points; 2) Goal difference; 3) Goals scored; 4) Head-to-head points; 5) Head-to-head goal difference; 6) Head-to-head away goals scored; 7) Play-off if relevant for deciding champion, relegation or participating in a European league, otherwise by draw. 8) Penalty shoot-out (only after a play-off)
(O) Play-off winners; (P) Promoted

==== Results summary ====
Overall								Home						Away					
Pld	W	D	L	GF	GA	GD	Pts	W	D	L	GF	GA	GD	W	D	L	GF	GA	GD
7	3	3	1	15	12	+3	12	1	1	1	6	6	0	2	2	0	9	6	+3

Last updated: 22 September 2023.

==== Results by round ====
Round	1	2	3	4	5	6	7
Ground	A	H	A	H	H	A	A
Result	D	D	W	L	W	D	W
Position	7	14	6	14	8	10	

Updated to match(es) played on 22 September 2023. Source:
A = Away; H = Home; W = Win; D = Draw; L = Loss

==== Matches ====
The league fixtures were unveiled on 30 June 2023.

11 August 2023 1	Cambuur	2–2	Emmen	Leeuwarden
20:00 CEST (UTC+2)	Breij 66'; Kooistra 90+4'	Report	Scholte 38'; Hardeveld 44'	Stadium: Cambuur Stadion; Attendance: 10,000; Referee: Alex Bos

18 August 2023 2	Emmen	2–2	VVV-Venlo	Emmen
20:00 CEST (UTC+2)	Brouwer 13'; Parzyszek 71'	Report	Allouch 19', 33'	Stadium: De Oude Meerdijk; Attendance: 7,200; Referee: Jochem Kamphuis

25 August 2023 3	De Graafschap	0–1	Emmen	Doetinchem
20:00 CEST (UTC+2)		Report	Scholte 81'	Stadium: De Vijverberg; Attendance: 10,040; Referee: Jesse Rozendal

1 September 2023 4	Emmen	2–4	Dordrecht	Emmen
20:00 CEST (UTC+2)	Konings 39', 85'	Report	De Bie 14'; Segecic 24'; Suray 40'; Tee Wierik 78' (o.g.)	Stadium: De Oude Meerdijk; Referee: Robin Vereijken

15 September 2023 6	Jong Ajax	3–3	Emmen	Ouder-Amstel
20:00 CEST (UTC+2)		Report		Stadium: Sportpark De Toekomst; Referee: Robin Hensgens

18 September 2023 5	Emmen	2–0	Jong Utrecht	Emmen
20:00 CEST (UTC+2)	Brouwer (yellow card) 11'; Heylen 41'; Konings (yellow card) 46'; Ubbink 74'; Scholte (yellow card) 89'	Report	Held (yellow card) 29'; Leliendal (yellow card) 48'; Augustinus-Jensen (yellow card) 78'; Mukeh (yellow card) 80'; Andersen (yellow card) 90+4'	Stadium: De Oude Meerdijk; Attendance: 6,731; Referee: Luuk Timmer

22 September 2023 7	NAC Breda	1–3	Emmen	Breda
20:00 CEST (UTC+2)	Hardeveld 3' (o.g.)	Report	Vlak 14'; Dirksen (yellow card) 34'; Vos (yellow card) 54'; Heylen (yellow card) 55'; Konings 58'; Mendes 80'	Stadium: Rat Verlegh Stadion; Referee: Danny Makkelie

=== KNVB Cup ===
31 October–2 November 2023 First round	De Graafschap	v	Emmen	Doetinchem
--:-- CET (UTC+1)				Stadium: De Vijverberg
