= Robert Mühren =

Dutch footballer (born 1989)

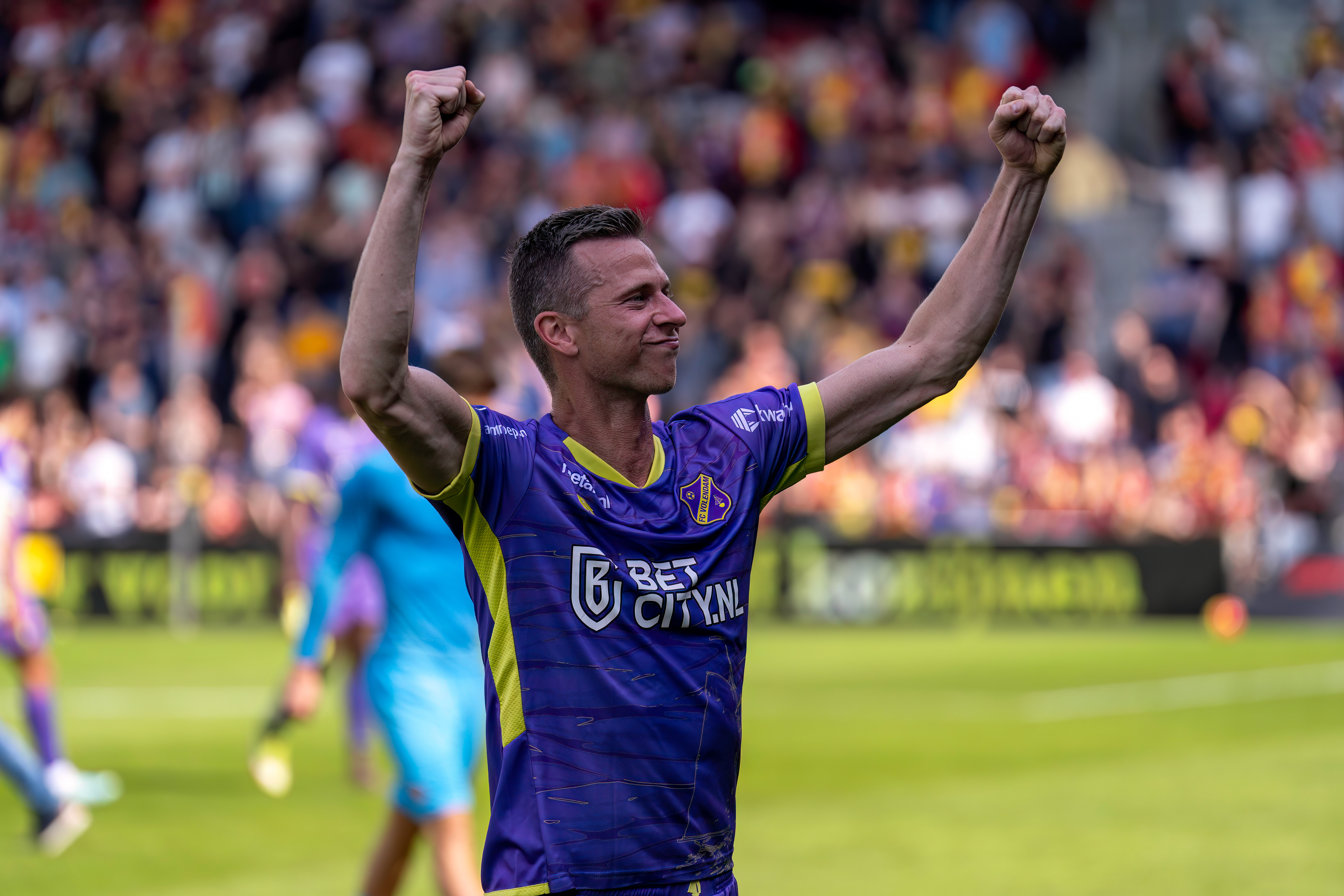
- Mühren in 2023

Personal information
- Date of birth: 18 May 1989 (age 37)
- Place of birth: Purmerend, Netherlands
- Height: 1.87 m (6 ft 2 in)
- Position: Forward

Team information
- Current team: Volendam (assistant)

Youth career
- 1995–2001: RKAV Volendam
- 2002–2006: Ajax
- 2006–2009: Volendam
- 2009–2011: RKAV Volendam

Senior career*
Years	Team	Apps	(Gls)
2011–2014	Volendam	102	(49)
2014–2017	AZ	47	(11)
2016	Jong AZ	3	(3)
2017–2021	Zulte Waregem	12	(2)
2017–2018	→ Sparta Rotterdam (loan)	28	(7)
2018–2019	→ NAC Breda (loan)	14	(0)
2019–2021	→ Cambuur (loan)	66	(64)
2021–2026	Volendam	154	(66)
Total		426	(202)
- * Club domestic league appearances and goals

Robert Mühren (born 18 May 1989) is a Dutch football coach and former player who is assistant coach of Volendam.

A forward, Mühren made his first breakthrough as part of FC Volendam, where he was as a proven goalscorer. He moved to AZ in 2014, but mostly appeared as a substitute, and then signed with Belgian club Zulte Waregem in January 2017. There, he failed to make the team, and was sent on loans to Sparta, NAC Breda and Cambuur, emerging as top goalscorer of the Eerste Divisie with the latter. In 2021, he returned to Volendam, helping them promote to the Eredivisie in his first season back.

Mühren is the nephew of former Dutch internationals Gerrie Mühren and Arnold Mühren.

== Career ==
=== Volendam ===
Mühren was born in Purmerend. He made his professional debut for boyhood club FC Volendam on 5 August 2011, playing the full ninety minutes in an Eerste Divisie match against FC Dordrecht; the game ended 0–0. His first goals for the club came in an Eerste Divisie match on 30 September, netting twice in the first half as Volendam defeated Fortuna Sittard 3–2. On 10 February 2013, Mühren netted his first professional hat-trick, and fellow strike-partner Jack Tuyp also scored a hat-trick as Volendam defeated Telstar 6–2.

On the opening day of the 2013–14 Eerste Divisie season on 3 August 2013, Mühren scored all of Volendam's goals in a 3–2 away victory over Almere City. In a KNVB Cup match against Eredivisie heavyweights Ajax on 25 September 2013, Mühren netted a brace as Volendam fell to a 4–2 defeat in extra time. The game came just six days after the death of Robert's uncle Gerrie Mühren, who started his career with Volendam before going on to be a part of the great Ajax teams of the 1970s that won three consecutive European Cups.

On 10 February 2014, Mühren netted twice in the first half before completing his hat-trick in the second half, as Volendam defeated Jong FC Twente 4–2. In the 32nd round of the Eerste Divisie tournament on 21 March, he scored in either half as Volendam defeated Jong PSV by a score of 3–1 at the Kras Stadion. By scoring in Volendam's next fixture, a 2–1 defeat to Excelsior on 28 March, Mühren reached 24 league goals for the season and had completed a remarkable run of scoring in eight of his previous ten appearances.

=== AZ ===
On 28 August 2014, Mühren signed a three-year deal with AZ, leaving for a fee of €350,000. He made his Eredivisie debut three days later in a 3–1 win against Dordrecht. He scored his first goal on 5 October in a 2–2 draw against Twente.

With the Alkmaar-based club, he made ten appearances in the UEFA Europa League, scoring two goals. He scored his first goal in the tournament on 27 August 2015, in the play-off round against Romanian club Astra Giurgiu. He scored his second goal on 20 October 2016 against Israeli side Maccabi Tel Aviv.

Mühren scored a number of important goals for AZ in the first half of the 2016–17 season and grew into a starter, but soon lost his place in the team due to the emergence of Wout Weghorst.

=== Zulte Waregem ===
After two-and-a-half years with AZ, some of which were spent with the reserve team, he moved to Belgian Jupiler Pro League side Zulte Waregem on 31 January 2017.

Mühren scored two goals in 12 games for Zulte Waregem, but left on loan after serving out only six months of his four-and-a-half-year contract, after having disagreements with manager Francky Dury.

==== Loans ====
Mühren was sent on loan to Eredivisie club Sparta Rotterdam on 17 August 2017. Three days later, on 20 August 2017, he was immediately successful for his new and temporary employer by scored the equaliser a home game against PEC Zwolle (1–1). He became the club's top goalscorer that season with nine goals, but the side suffered relegation at the end of the season via playoffs.

The following year he was sent on loan to NAC Breda. This proved largely unsuccessful due to a long-term injury.

In the 2019–20 season, Mühren was sent on loan to second-tier Eerste Divisie club Cambuur, where he developed into a particularly productive striker by scoring 26 goals before the season was abandoned due to the global COVID-19 pandemic. Mühren extended his loan deal after the season, with the hopes of reaching promotion to the Eredivisie with this club. After 24 games played in the 2020–21 season, he already had 25 goals with 6 assists to his name. He scored his 100th Eerste Divisie goal on 22 February 2021. In May 2021, he won the Eerste Divisie title with Cambuur which meant promotion to the Eredivisie. He finished his loan at Cambuur with 66 appearances in which he scored 64 goals.

=== Return to Volendam ===
Despite interest from Cambuur in signing him permanently following their promotion to the top tier, Mühren surprisingly returned to second-tier club Volendam on 29 May 2021, signing a three-year contract. This marked a return to the club he played for six years earlier. He helped Volendam reach promotion to the Eredivisie in his first season back, scoring 29 goals and providing 12 assists in 37 league appearances. In May 2022, he secured his third consecutive title as the Eerste Divisie player of the season, as voted by the league.

On 5 February 2026, Mühren announced his retirement at the end of the season. He became assistant coach under Edwin van de Looi from the 2026–27 season.

== Personal life ==
Mühren is the nephew of former Dutch internationals Gerrie Mühren and Arnold Mühren. Arnold played for Ipswich Town in the 1981 UEFA Cup Final, beating Robert's former club, AZ.

== Career statistics ==
Appearances and goals by club, season and competition
Club	Season	League			National cup		Europe		Other		Total	
Club	Season	Division	Apps	Goals	Apps	Goals	Apps	Goals	Apps	Goals	Apps	Goals
Volendam	2011–12	Eerste Divisie	31	9	2	0	—		—		33	9
Volendam	2012–13	Eerste Divisie	33	9	1	0	—		4 (Note: Appearances in the Eredivisie relegation play-offs)	1	38	10
Volendam	2013–14	Eerste Divisie	34	25	1	2	—		—		35	27
Volendam	2014–15	Eerste Divisie	4	6	0	0	—		—		4	6
Volendam	Total		102	49	4	2	—		4	1	110	52
AZ	2014–15	Eredivisie	17	4	2	1	—		—		19	5
AZ	2015–16	Eredivisie	18	1	5	2	7 (Note: Appearances in the Europa League)	1	—		30	4
AZ	2016–17	Eredivisie	12	6	3	3	3	1	—		18	10
AZ	Total		47	11	10	6	10	2	—		67	19
Jong AZ	2016–17	Tweede Divisie	3	3	—		—		—		3	3
Zulte Waregem	2016–17	Belgian First Division A	12	2	1	0	—		0	0	13	2
Sparta Rotterdam (loan)	2017–18	Eredivisie	28	7	1	0	—		4	2	33	9
NAC Breda (loan)	2018–19	Eredivisie	14	0	1	0	—		—		15	1
Cambuur (loan)	2019–20	Eerste Divisie	29	26	0	0	—		—		29	26
Cambuur (loan)	2020–21	Eerste Divisie	37	38	0	0	—		0	0	37	38
Cambuur (loan)	Total		66	64	0	0	—		0	0	66	64
Volendam	2021–22	Eerste Divisie	37	29	1	0	—		—		38	29
Volendam	2022–23	Eredivisie	28	5	1	1	—		—		29	6
Volendam	2023–24	Eredivisie	23	8	1	0	—		—		24	8
Volendam	2024–25	Eerste Divisie	35	18	1	0	—		—		36	18
Volendam	2025–26	Eredivisie	31	6	4	1	—		2	0	37	7
Volendam	Total		154	66	8	2	—		2	0	164	68
Career total			426	202	25	10	10	2	10	3	471	217

== Honours ==
Zulte Waregem

- Belgian Cup: 2016–17

Cambuur

- Eerste Divisie: 2020–21

Volendam

- Eerste Divisie: 2024–25

Individual

- Eerste Divisie Player of the Season: 2019–20, 2020–21, 2021–22
- Eerste Divisie Golden Boot: 2019–20, 2020–21
