= Barry Lauwers =

Dutch footballer (born 1999)

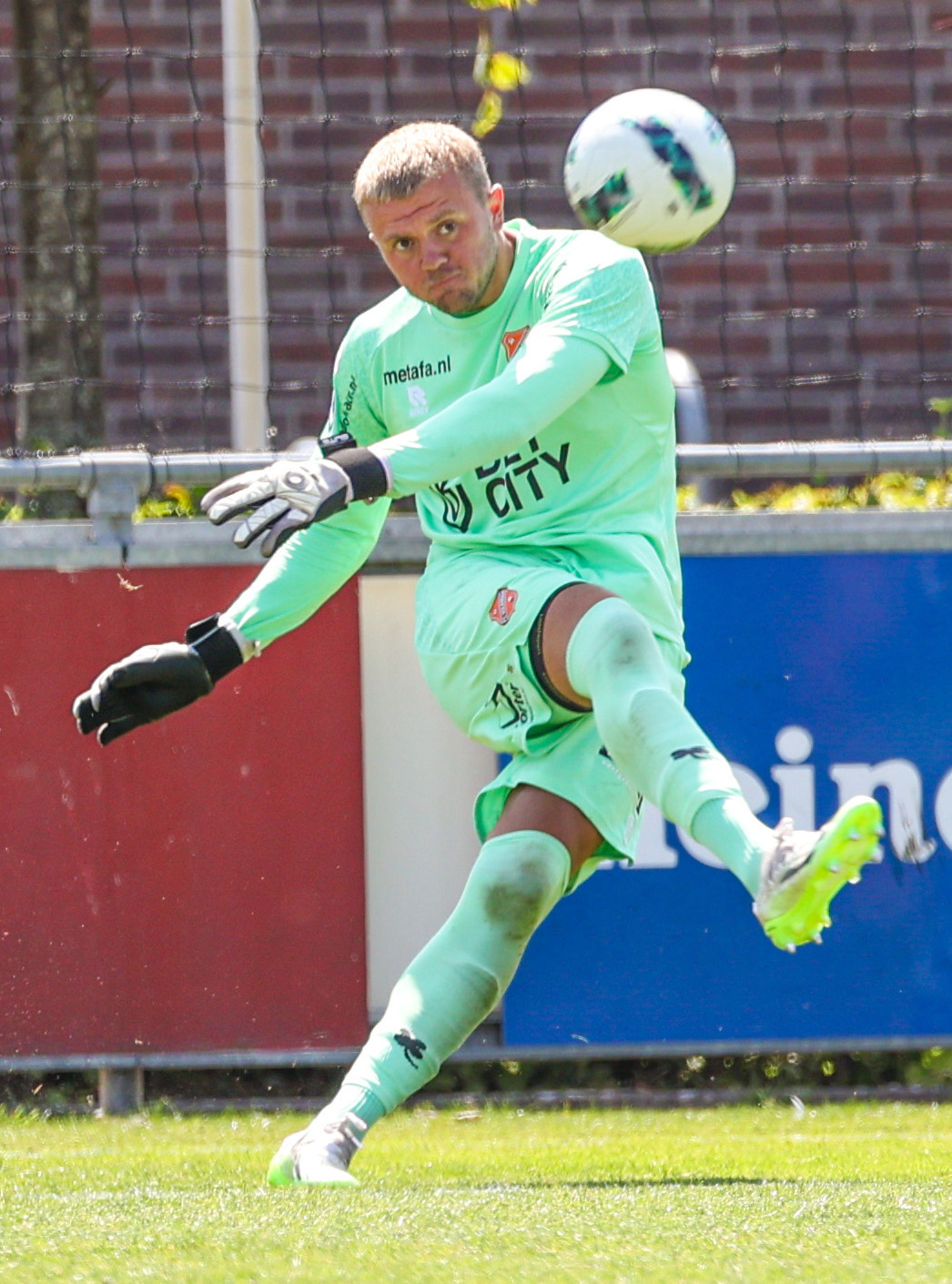
- Lauwers with Volendam in 2023

Personal information
- Date of birth: 29 November 1999 (age 26)
- Place of birth: Purmerend, Netherlands
- Height: 1.89 m (6 ft 2 in)
- Position: Goalkeeper

Team information
- Current team: RKAV Volendam
- Number: 22

Youth career
- –2011: FC Purmerend
- 2011–2019: FC Volendam

Senior career*
| Years | Team | Apps | (Gls) |
| 2019–2023 | Jong FC Volendam | 51 | (0) |
| 2020–2025 | FC Volendam | 23 | (0) |
| 2025– | RKAV Volendam | 13 | (0) |
- * Club domestic league appearances and goals as of 13 December 2025

Barry Lauwers (born 29 November 1999) is a Dutch professional footballer who plays as a goalkeeper for Tweede Divisie club RKAV Volendam.

== Career ==
Born in Purmerend, Lauwers began his football education at FC Purmerend before joining the youth academy of Volendam in 2011. He progressed through the club's youth ranks and made his debut for the reserve side, Jong Volendam, in 2018. That season, he was part of the squad that won the Derde Divisie (Sunday), securing promotion to the Tweede Divisie.

Lauwers made his first-team debut for Volendam on 12 May 2021, starting in a 2–1 home victory over Jong AZ. The following month, he signed a contract extension that kept him at the club until the summer of 2022.

Over the next two seasons, Lauwers primarily served as backup goalkeeper, most often deputising for Filip Stanković. Following Volendam's promotion to the Eredivisie in 2022, he made his top-flight debut on 18 February 2023, starting against Vitesse due to Stanković's injury. Lauwers played the full match and kept a clean sheet in a 2–0 victory, which proved to be his sole league appearance that season.

In June 2023, amid reported interest from other clubs, Lauwers extended his contract with Volendam. During the 2023–24 season, he again made a single league appearance, starting late in the campaign against Twente in a match played after Volendam's relegation had already been confirmed. The match ended in a 7–2 defeat.

Following the return of loanee Mio Backhaus to Werder Bremen, Lauwers began the 2024–25 season as Volendam's first-choice goalkeeper under new head coach Rick Kruys. After two months, however, the position was taken over by Kayne van Oevelen, and Lauwers returned to a reserve role. In mid-2025, with his contract expiring, Volendam confirmed that it would not be renewed, bringing his time at the club to an end.

On 29 August 2025, Lauwers joined Tweede Divisie club RKAV Volendam.

== Career statistics ==
As of match played 13 December 2025

Appearances and goals by club, season and competition
| Club | Season | League | | | National cup | | Other | | Total | |
| Club | Season | Division | Apps | Goals | Apps | Goals | Apps | Goals | Apps | Goals |
|---|---|---|---|---|---|---|---|---|---|---|
| Jong Volendam | 2019–20 | Derde Divisie | 18 | 0 | — | | — | | 18 | 0 |
| Jong Volendam | 2020–21 | Tweede Divisie | 1 | 0 | — | | — | | 1 | 0 |
| Jong Volendam | 2021–22 | Tweede Divisie | 7 | 0 | — | | — | | 7 | 0 |
| Jong Volendam | 2022–23 | Tweede Divisie | 9 | 0 | — | | — | | 9 | 0 |
| Jong Volendam | Total | | 35 | 0 | — | | — | | 35 | 0 |
| Volendam | 2020–21 | Eerste Divisie | 1 | 0 | 0 | 0 | 0 | 0 | 1 | 0 |
| Volendam | 2021–22 | Eerste Divisie | 11 | 0 | 0 | 0 | — | | 11 | 0 |
| Volendam | 2022–23 | Eredivisie | 1 | 0 | 0 | 0 | — | | 1 | 0 |
| Volendam | 2023–24 | Eredivisie | 1 | 0 | 0 | 0 | — | | 1 | 0 |
| Volendam | 2024–25 | Eerste Divisie | 9 | 0 | 0 | 0 | — | | 9 | 0 |
| Volendam | Total | | 23 | 0 | 0 | 0 | 0 | 0 | 23 | 0 |
| RKAV Volendam | 2025–26 | Tweede Divisie | 13 | 0 | 1 | 0 | — | | 14 | 0 |
| Career total | | | 71 | 0 | 1 | 0 | 0 | 0 | 72 | 0 |
