= 2026–27 De Graafschap season =

De Graafschap
2026–27 season
- Stadium: De Vijverberg
- Eerste Divisie: Pre-season
- KNVB Cup: Pre-season

The 2026–27 season is the 73rd season in the history of De Graafschap and the eighth consecutive season in the Eerste Divisie, the second tier of Dutch football. The club will also compete in the KNVB Cup.

== Transfers ==
=== In ===
Pos.	Player	Transferred from	Fee	Date	Source
DF	(Netherlands) Gijs Bolk	(Netherlands) Emmen	Free	1 July 2026	
DF	(Liberia) Mark Pabai	(Slovenia) Koper	Free	1 July 2026	
MF	(Netherlands) Donny Warmerdam	(Indonesia) PSIM Yogyakarta	Free	1 July 2026	

=== Out ===
Pos.	Player	Transferred to	Fee	Date	Source
MF	(Netherlands) Chahid El Allachi	(Cyprus) Aris Limassol	Undisclosed	1 July 2026	
MF	(Morocco) Ibrahim El Kadiri	(Germany) Darmstadt 98	Undisclosed	1 July 2026	

== Pre-season and friendlies ==
27 June 2026 Friendly	Utrecht (Netherlands)	1–2	(Netherlands) De Graafschap
11:00	Min 4'		De Jong 3', 41'

3 July 2026 Friendly	sc Heerenveen (Netherlands)	7–2	(Netherlands) De Graafschap
19:00	3'; 40'; 41'; 57'; 79'; 87'; 90+8'		56'; 90+24'
Note: A match comprising two periods of one hour each.

25 July 2026 Friendly	De Graafschap (Netherlands)	4–2	(Greece) AE Kifisia
15:00

== Competitions ==
=== Overall record ===
Competition	Starting round	Record							
Competition	Starting round	Pld	W	D	L	GF	GA	GD	Win %
Eerste Divisie	Matchday 1	0	0	0	0	0	0	+0	—
KNVB Cup		0	0	0	0	0	0	+0	—
Total		0	0	0	0	0	0	+0	—

Source: Competitions

=== Eerste Divisie ===
Pos	Team	Pld	W	D	L	GF	GA	GD	Pts	Promotion or qualification
13	Jong PSV	14	4	5	5	18	22	−4	17	Reserve teams are not eligible to be promoted to the Eredivisie
14	Jong Ajax	14	4	4	6	22	30	−8	16	Reserve teams are not eligible to be promoted to the Eredivisie
15	De Graafschap	13	4	3	6	17	27	−10	15	
16	TOP Oss	14	4	2	8	20	23	−3	14	
17	Helmond Sport	14	3	3	8	25	31	−6	12	

Updated to match(es) played on 6 November 2026. Source: Flashscore, Keuken Kampioen Divisie (in Dutch)
Rules for classification: Season in progress: 1) Most points won; 2) Less points lost; 3) Goal difference; 4) Goals scored; 5) Head-to-head points; 6) Head-to-head goal difference; 7) Head-to-head goals scored 8) Head-to-head away goals scored 9) Alphabetical order; End of season: 1) Points; 2) Goal difference; 3) Goals scored; 4) Head-to-head points; 5) Head-to-head goal difference; 6) Head-to-head goals scored 7) Head-to-head away goals scored; 8) Extra match or series of matches 9) Goal difference (series of matches) 10) Goals scored (series of matches) 11) Penalty shoot-out (extra match or series of matches)
