= Kayne van Oevelen =

Dutch footballer (born 2003)

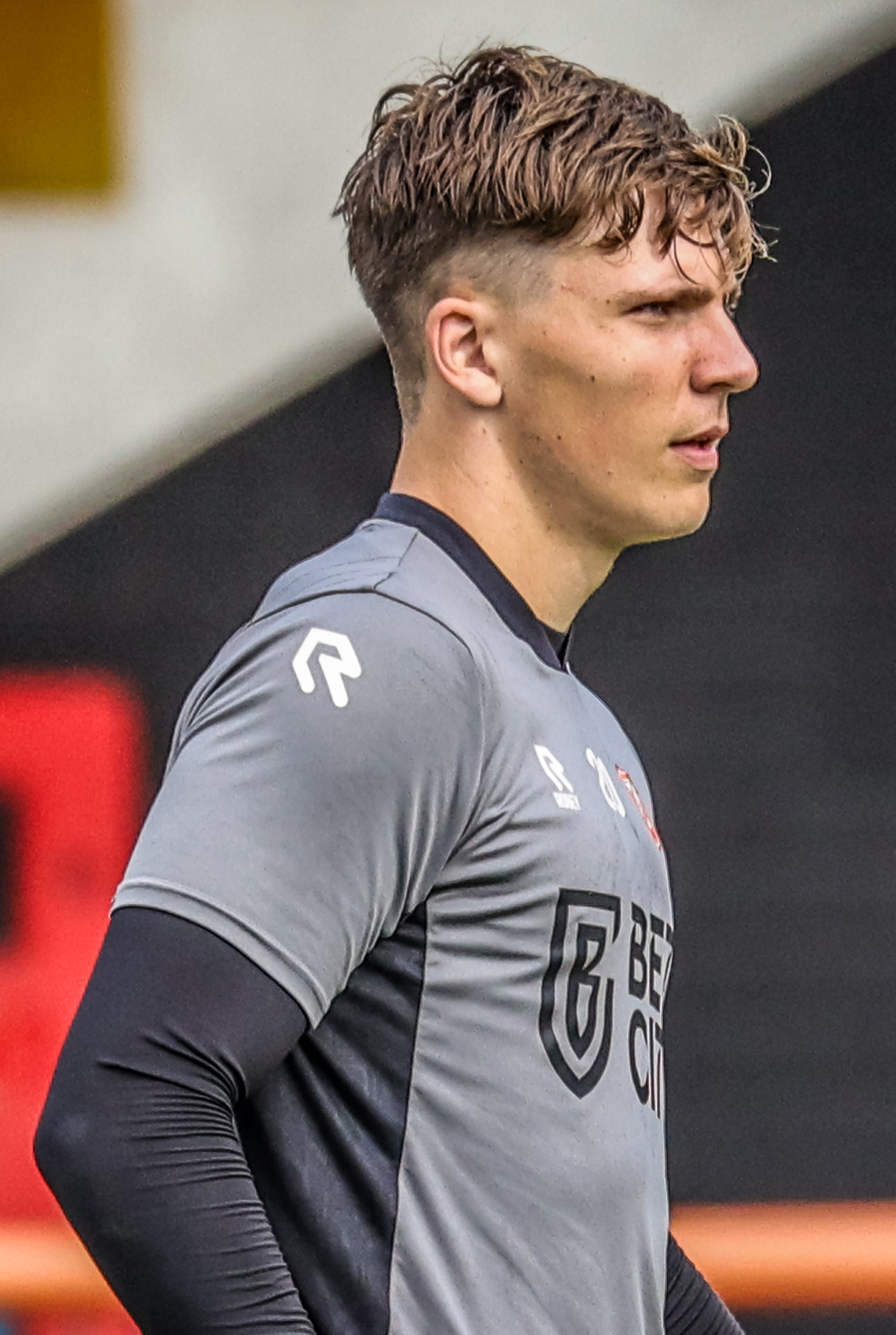
- Van Oevelen training with Volendam in 2023

Personal information
- Date of birth: 7 August 2003 (age 23)
- Place of birth: Zaandam, Netherlands
- Height: 1.99 m (6 ft 6 in)
- Position: Goalkeeper

Team information
- Current team: Valencia (on loan from Ipswich Town)
- Number: 25

Youth career
- –2021: AFC
- 2021–2024: Volendam

Senior career*
| Years | Team | Apps | (Gls) |
| 2022–2024 | Jong Volendam | 37 | (0) |
| 2024–2026 | Volendam | 61 | (0) |
| 2026– | Ipswich Town | 0 | (0) |
| 2026– | → Valencia (loan) | 0 | (0) |
- * Club domestic league appearances and goals as of 19 May 2026

Kayne van Oevelen (born 7 August 2003) is a Dutch professional footballer who plays as a goalkeeper for La Liga club Valencia, on loan from Premier League club Ipswich Town.

== Career ==
Van Oevelen was born in Zaandam in North Holland and he played as an outfield player until the age of 14 years old. Van Oevelen joined Volendam from Amsterdamsche FC in the summer of 2021 and made 16 appearances for Jong Volendam during debut season, signing a three-year professional contract with the club that summer. Van Oevelen's performances that season included a string of saves against his former club AFC that saw him voted the Voetbal247 player of the week in October 2021.

Van Oevelen made his debut for FC Volendam in the Eredivisie against Go Ahead Eagles on 19 May 2024. The following season Van Oevelen displaced first choice goalkeeper Barry Lauwers to play for the club for the first time in the Eerste Divisie against Vitesse Arnhem on 4 October 2024.

On 21 July 2026, Van Oevelen joined newly promoted Premier League club Ipswich Town on a five-year contract. On 24 August, he was loaned to La Liga side Valencia for the season.

== Career statistics ==
As of match played 8 March 2026

Appearances and goals by club, season and competition
| Club | Season | League | | | National cup (Note: Includes KNVB Cup) | | League cup | | Europe | | Other | | Total | |
| Club | Season | Division | Apps | Goals | Apps | Goals | Apps | Goals | Apps | Goals | Apps | Goals | Apps | Goals |
|---|---|---|---|---|---|---|---|---|---|---|---|---|---|---|
| Jong Volendam | 2021–22 | Tweede Divisie | 16 | 0 | — | | — | | — | | — | | 16 | 0 |
| Jong Volendam | 2022–23 | Tweede Divisie | 21 | 0 | — | | — | | — | | — | | 21 | 0 |
| Jong Volendam | Total | | 37 | 0 | — | | — | | — | | — | | 37 | 0 |
| Volendam | 2022–23 | Eredivisie | 0 | 0 | 0 | 0 | — | | — | | — | | 0 | 0 |
| Volendam | 2023–24 | Eredivisie | 1 | 0 | 0 | 0 | — | | — | | — | | 1 | 0 |
| Volendam | 2024–25 | Eerste Divisie | 28 | 0 | 2 | 0 | — | | — | | — | | 30 | 0 |
| Volendam | 2025–26 | Eredivisie | 26 | 0 | 1 | 0 | — | | — | | — | | 27 | 0 |
| Volendam | Total | | 55 | 0 | 3 | 0 | — | | — | | — | | 58 | 0 |
| Ipswich Town | 2026–27 | Premier League | 0 | 0 | 0 | 0 | 0 | 0 | — | | — | | 0 | 0 |
| Career total | | | 92 | 0 | 3 | 0 | 0 | 0 | 0 | 0 | 0 | 0 | 95 | 0 |

== Honours ==
Volendam

- Eerste Divisie: 2024–25

Individual

- Eredivisie Player of the Month: April 2026
