= Piotr Parzyszek =

Polish footballer (born 1993)

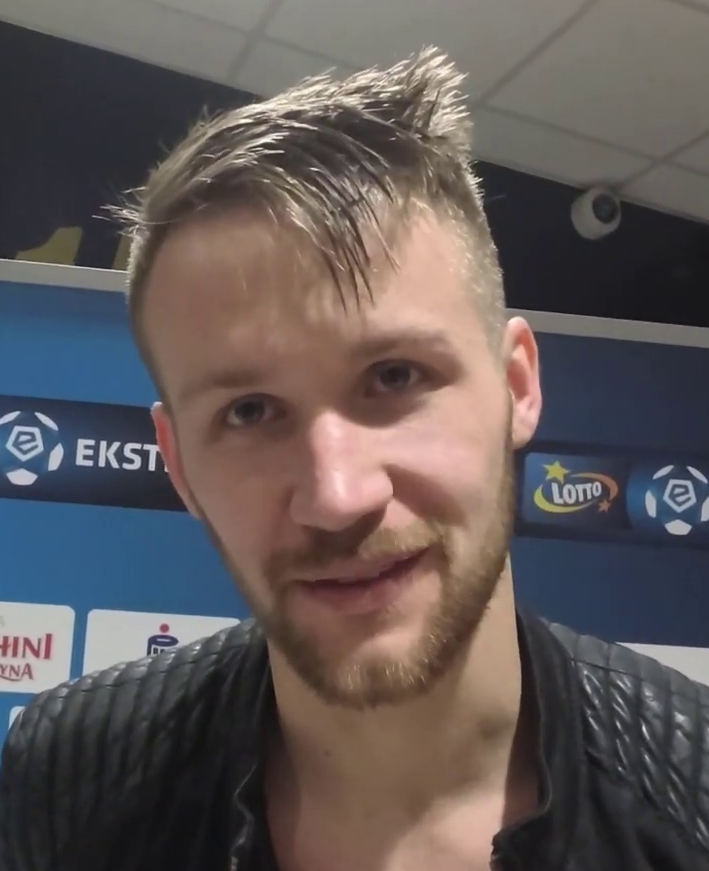
- Parzyszek in 2019

Personal information
- Date of birth: 8 September 1993 (age 33)
- Place of birth: Toruń, Poland
- Height: 1.91 m (6 ft 3 in)
- Position: Forward

Team information
- Current team: KuPS

Youth career
- 1999–2004: Eldenia
- 2004–2005: Vitesse
- 2005–2007: ESA Rijkerswoerd
- 2007–2012: De Graafschap

Senior career*
Years	Team	Apps	(Gls)
2012–2014	De Graafschap	52	(29)
2014–2016	Charlton Athletic	1	(0)
2014–2015	→ Sint-Truiden (loan)	31	(11)
2015–2016	→ Randers (loan)	8	(1)
2016–2017	De Graafschap	50	(28)
2017–2018	Zwolle	23	(5)
2018–2020	Piast Gliwice	74	(21)
2020–2022	Frosinone	28	(5)
2021–2022	→ Pogoń Szczecin (loan)	27	(1)
2022–2023	Leganés	9	(0)
2023–2024	Emmen	35	(9)
2024–2025	RWD Molenbeek	29	(9)
2025	KuPS	13	(7)
2026	Pakhtakor	10	(2)
2026–	KuPS	14	(2)

International career
2011	Poland U18	3	(0)
2013	Poland U20	1	(0)
2013–2014	Poland U21	4	(0)
- * Club domestic league appearances and goals as of 12 November 2026

Piotr Parzyszek (born 8 September 1993) is a Polish professional footballer who plays as a forward for Veikkausliiga club KuPS.

== Career ==
=== De Graafschap ===
Born in Toruń, Poland, Parzyszek started his career with Dutch side De Graafschap in 2012. In January 2014, he received attention from several teams, including Benfica, West Ham United and Nantes. He played 52 league matches for De Graafschap in which he scored 29 times.

=== Charlton Athletic ===
On 30 January 2014, it was announced Parzyszek had been sold to Championship side Charlton Athletic. He made his first and what turned out to be only appearance for the club as a late substitute against Birmingham City on 8 February 2014.

On 3 February 2016, it was confirmed that Parzyszek had been released from his contract.

==== Sint-Truiden (loan) ====
Parzyszek was loaned out in the summer of 2014 for one season to Sint-Truiden where he scored two goals on his debut.

==== Randers (loan) ====
Parzyszek was loaned out again in the summer of 2015 for one season to Randers.

Parzyszek's loan contract was terminated on 1 February 2016, after the club announced, that it was Parzyszek's own request.

=== Frosinone ===
On 29 September 2020, he joined Italian Serie B side Frosinone. On 29 August 2022, he was released by the club.

==== Pogoń Szczecin (loan) ====
On 12 July 2021, he joined Pogoń Szczecin on a season-long loan.

=== Leganés ===
On 1 September 2022, Leganés announced an agreement in principle with Parzyszek on a two-year deal, pending legal procedures. The following 19 June, after just nine league matches, he terminated his contract with the club.

=== Emmen ===
On 13 July 2023, Parzyszek returned to Dutch football, signing a one-year deal with an extension option with Eerste Divisie side Emmen. He left the club at the end of the 2023–24 season.

=== RWD Molenbeek ===
On 3 July 2024, Parzyszek joined Belgian Challenger Pro League club RWD Molenbeek on a one-year contract with an option for a further year. He recorded nine goals and five assists in 33 appearances across all competitions, captaining the club throughout most of the season. On 29 April 2025, it was announced Parzyszek would leave RWD at the end of his contract.

=== KuPS ===
On 5 August 2025, Parzyszek signed with Finnish Veikkausliiga club Kuopion Palloseura. He scored seven goals in thirteen league appearances in 2025, helping KuPS win their eighth league title. He also scored thrice in the UEFA Conference League league phase, finding the back of the net against Drita, Slovan Bratislava and Crystal Palace. Parzyszek concluded his stint at KuPS with 11 goals and two assists in 24 appearances, and left the club on 31 December 2025.

=== Pakhtakor ===
On 17 February 2026, Uzbekistan Super League club Pakhtakor announced the signing of Parzyszek. On 1 July 2026, Pakhtakor announced that Parzyszek had left the club after his contract was mutually terminated.

=== Return to KuPS ===
On 2 July 2026, Paryszek rejoined KuPS on a one-year contract.

== Career statistics ==
As of match played 27 May 2026

Appearances and goals by club, season and competition
Club	Season	League			National cup (Note: Includes KNVB Cup, Belgian Cup, Danish Cup, Polish Cup, Copa del Rey, Finnish Cup)		Continental		Other		Total	
Club	Season	Division	Apps	Goals	Apps	Goals	Apps	Goals	Apps	Goals	Apps	Goals
De Graafschap	2012–13	Eerste Divisie	32	13	0	0	—		—		32	13
De Graafschap	2013–14	Eerste Divisie	20	16	1	0	—		—		21	16
De Graafschap	Total		52	29	1	0	—		—		53	29
Charlton Athletic	2013–14	Championship	1	0	0	0	—		—		1	0
Sint-Truiden (loan)	2014–15	Belgian Second Division	31	11	1	0	—		—		32	11
Randers (loan)	2015–16	Danish Superliga	8	1	2	2	—		—		10	3
De Graafschap	2015–16	Eredivisie	12	3	—		—		—		12	3
De Graafschap	2016–17	Eerste Divisie	38	25	1	0	—		—		39	25
De Graafschap	Total		50	28	1	0	—		—		51	28
Zwolle	2017–18	Eredivisie	23	5	2	1	—		—		25	6
Piast Gliwice	2018–19	Ekstraklasa	33	9	1	0	—		—		34	9
Piast Gliwice	2019–20	Ekstraklasa	37	12	1	0	4 (Note: Two appearances and one goal in UEFA Champions League, two appearances in UEFA Europa League)	1	1 (Note: Appearance in Polish Super Cup)	0	43	13
Piast Gliwice	2020–21	Ekstraklasa	4	0	1	1	3 (Note: Appearances in UEFA Europa League)	0	—		8	1
Piast Gliwice	Total		74	21	3	1	7	1	1	0	85	23
Frosinone	2020–21	Serie B	28	5	0	0	—		—		28	5
Pogoń Szczecin (loan)	2021–22	Ekstraklasa	27	1	1	0	2 (Note: Appearances in UEFA Europa Conference League)	0	—		30	1
Leganés	2022–23	Segunda División	9	0	1	0	—		—		10	0
Emmen	2023–24	Eerste Divisie	35	9	1	0	—		4 (Note: Appearances in Eerste Divisie promotion play-offs)	1	40	10
RWD Molenbeek	2024–25	Challenger Pro League	29	9	2	0	—		2 (Note: Appearances in Challenger Pro League promotion play-offs)	0	33	9
KuPS	2025	Veikkausliiga	13	7	2	1	9 (Note: Three appearances in UEFA Europa League, six appearances and three goals in UEFA Conference League)	3	0	0	24	11
Pakhtakor	2026	Uzbekistan Super League	10	2	2	0	0	0	1 (Note: Appearance in Uzbekistan Super Cup)	0	13	2
Career total			390	128	19	5	18	4	8	1	435	138

== Honours ==
Piast Gliwice

- Ekstraklasa: 2018–19

KuPS

- Veikkausliiga: 2025
