= Xavier Mbuyamba =

Dutch footballer (born 2001)

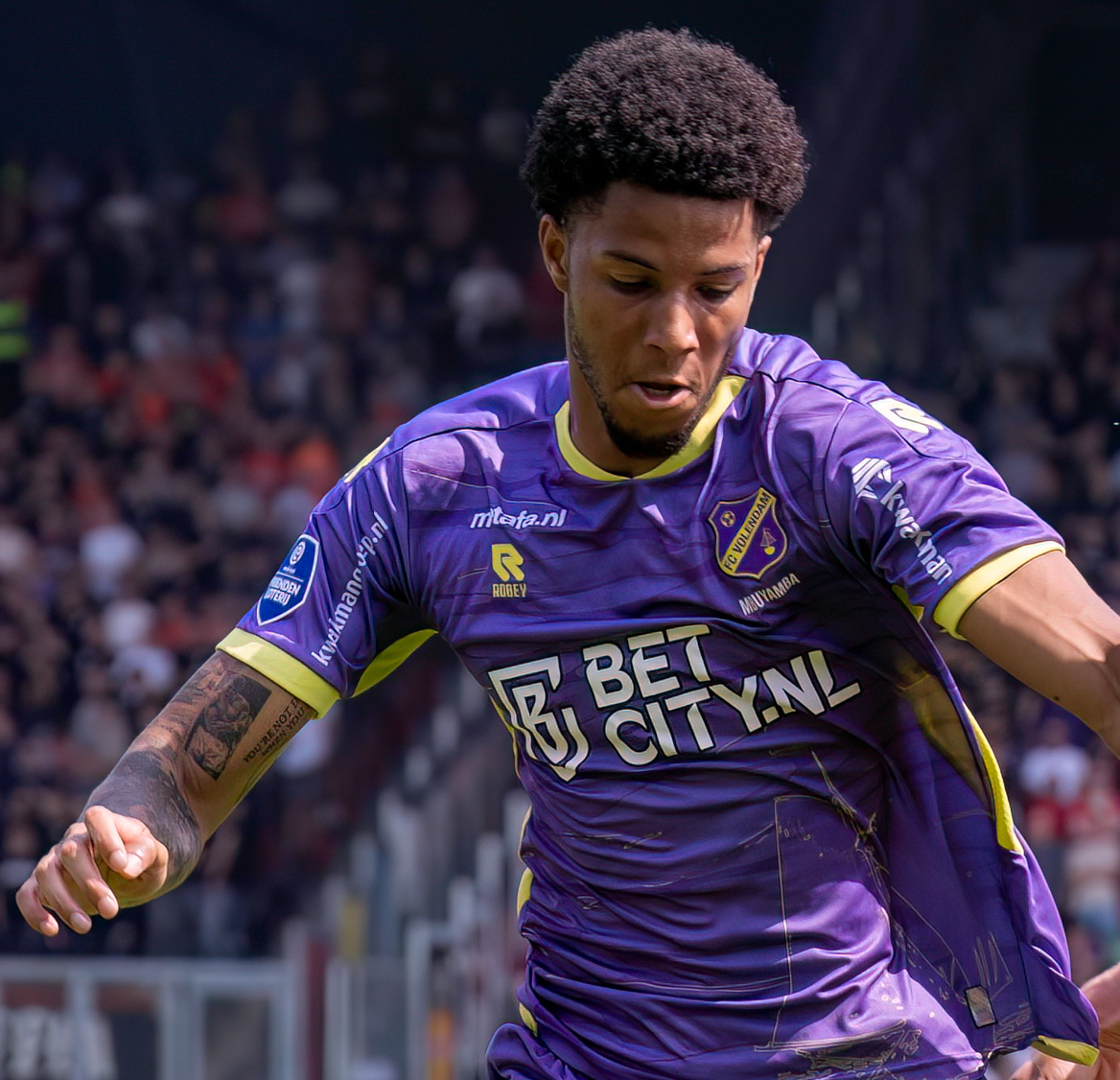
- Mbuyamba with Volendam in 2023

Personal information
- Full name: Xavier Tshimanga Kamaluba Ntite Mukendi Mpoyi Mbuyamba
- Date of birth: 31 December 2001 (age 24)
- Place of birth: Maastricht, Netherlands
- Height: 1.95 m (6 ft 5 in)
- Position: Centre-back

Team information
- Current team: Persija Jakarta
- Number: 3

Youth career
- –2012: VV Scharn
- 2012–2018: MVV
- 2019–2020: Barcelona
- 2020–2022: Chelsea

Senior career*
Years	Team	Apps	(Gls)
2018–2019	MVV	11	(0)
2022–2026	Volendam	87	(11)
2026–	LASK	24	(3)

International career
2019	Netherlands U19	1	(0)
- * Club domestic league appearances and goals as of 21:30, 31 October 2026 (UTC)

Xavier Tshimanga Kamaluba Ntite Mukendi Mpoyi Mbuyamba (born 31 December 2001) is a Dutch professional footballer who plays as a centre-back for Austrian Bundesliga club LASK.

Mbuyamba made his professional debut for MVV in 2018 and became the club's youngest-ever debutant, before moving to Barcelona the following year. After a season in Spain, he joined Premier League side Chelsea where he continued his progression with the club's development side. He left Chelsea on a permanent deal on 1 September 2022 to join Eredivisie side, Volendam.

A Dutch youth international, Mbuyamba represented the Netherlands under-19 team in 2019, although he remains eligible to represent DR Congo through descent.

== Club career ==
=== MVV ===
==== Early life and career ====
Mbuyamba was born in Maastricht, Netherlands to a Congolese father and Dutch mother and is one of four brothers born from the relationship. He hails from a sporting family and his older brother, Nathan, plays in the lower leagues in the Dutch system while his younger brother, Jeannot, is a budding goalkeeper. His other sibling, Noah, is an aspirant Paralympic sprinter. Mbuyamba started his footballing career with amateur clubs VV de Heeg and VV Scharn before joining the development structures of MVV at the age of nine. There, he rapidly progressed through the club's academy and, upon making his senior debut against Volendam in the Eerste Divisie in November 2018, he became the club's youngest-ever player at the age of 16 years, 10 months and nine days. He ultimately made 11 league appearances for Maastricht throughout the season and his performances reportedly attracted attention from a host of European clubs, including the likes of Bayern Munich, Chelsea, Liverpool and Real Madrid. Mbuyamba was later invited to trial with Chelsea and was only prevented a move to London due to the club's transfer ban at the time, before electing instead to sign his first professional contract with Barcelona.

=== Barcelona ===
Having previously only signed a youth agreement with Maastricht, Mbuyamba turned down a three-year professional contract offer from the club in 2019 in favour of a move to La Liga side Barcelona. The move came about following an approach from Barça's academy director and former Netherlands international Patrick Kluivert, and saw him become the fourth Dutch player to join the Catalan side ahead of the 2019–20 season following the club's earlier acquisitions of Frenkie de Jong, Ludovit Reis and Mike van Beijnen. Mbuyamba initially teamed up with the club's under-19 team where he played as both a right-back and centre-back throughout the season, representing the side in the UEFA Youth League, before earning the chance to train with the first team and feature in the match day squad during Barcelona B's 2–0 win against Ejea in January 2020.

=== Chelsea ===
After reaching an agreement for his release from Barcelona in June, Mbuyamba joined Premier League side Chelsea on 20 August 2020 on a three-year deal. However, soon after his arrival in London he suffered a torn meniscus injury which required surgery and which ultimately saw him sidelined for the majority of the season. After a period of eight months of rehabilitation, he made his debut for the club's development side on 11 April 2021 as a late substitute and marked his return to action with a goal as Chelsea recorded a 3–1 win over Southampton U23.

=== Volendam ===
On 1 September 2022, Mbuyamba returned to the Netherlands to join newly promoted, Volendam on a three-year deal for an undisclosed fee. He was named captain ahead of the 2023–24 season after the departure of Carel Eiting. Missing all games between January and May 2024, Mbuyamba revealed that the club had discovered he had cardiac arrhythmia during the annual medical. Consequently, he underwent surgery to have a subcutaneous implantable defibrillator (S-ICD) implanted as primary prevention. He returned to action on 12 May, starting and playing the first half in a 7–2 loss to Twente. The following week, Volendam were relegated from the Eredivisie following a defeat against Ajax.

=== LASK ===
On 21 January 2026, Mbuyamba joined Austrian Bundesliga side LASK for an undisclosed fee, signing a contract until summer 2028.

== International career ==
Mbuyamba is a Dutch youth international and made his debut for the Netherlands U19 team in November 2019 when he started and played the whole match in a 3–3 friendly draw against Mexico However, despite representing his country of birth, he remains eligible to play for DR Congo through descent as his father was born in the African country.

== Style of play ==
Mbuyamba is a tall, athletic right-footed central defender who plays with the ball at his feet and is strong in the air. Due to his height, physical stature, aerial presence and proficiency on the ball, the latter of which has been accredited to his development at La Masia, he has often been compared to countryman Virgil van Dijk during the early stages of his career. While ordinarily a centre-back by trade, he also possesses the versatility to slot in at right-back and was used on occasion in this role at Maastricht and Barcelona.

== Career statistics ==
As of match played 3 November 2026

Appearances and goals by club, season and competition
Club	Season	League			National cup (Note: Includes KNVB Cup, FA Cup, Austrian Cup)		League cup (Note: Includes League/EFL Cup)		Europe		Other		Total	
Club	Season	Division	Apps	Goals	Apps	Goals	Apps	Goals	Apps	Goals	Apps	Goals	Apps	Goals
MVV	2018–19	Eerste Divisie	11	0	0	0	—		—		—		11	0
Chelsea U23	2021–22	—			—		—		—		4 (Note: Appearance in the EFL Trophy)	0	4	0
Volendam	2022–23	Eredivisie	28	5	2	0	—		—		—		30	5
Volendam	2023–24	Eredivisie	9	0	0	0	—		—		—		9	0
Volendam	2024–25	Eerste Divisie	34	5	2	0	—		—		—		36	5
Volendam	2025–26	Eredivisie	16	1	2	0	—		—		—		18	1
Volendam	Total		87	11	6	0	—		—		—		93	11
LASK	2025–26	Austrian Bundesliga	13	2	3	0	—		—		—		16	2
LASK	2026–27	Austrian Bundesliga	11	1	2	1	—		6 (Note: Appearances in UEFA Champions League)	0	—		19	2
LASK	Total		24	3	5	1	—		6	0	—		35	4
Career total			122	14	10	1	0	0	6	0	4	0	142	15

== Honours ==
LASK

- Austrian Bundesliga: 2025–26
- Austrian Cup: 2025–26
