= Gerry Vlak =

Dutch footballer (born 1996)

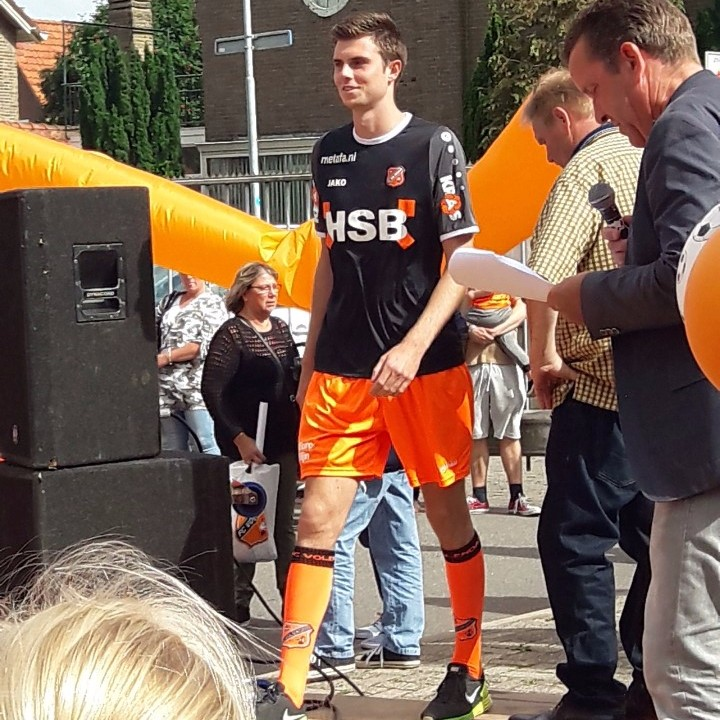
- Vlak in 2017

Personal information
- Date of birth: 25 March 1996 (age 30)
- Place of birth: Volendam, Netherlands
- Height: 1.90 m (6 ft 3 in)
- Position: Midfielder

Team information
- Current team: RKAV Volendam
- Number: 5

Youth career
- 2000–: RKAV Volendam
- –2015: FC Volendam

Senior career*
Years	Team	Apps	(Gls)
2015–2020	FC Volendam	72	(3)
2016–2020	Jong FC Volendam	66	(12)
2020–2021	IJsselmeervogels	5	(0)
2021–2026	Koninklijke HFC	155	(13)
2026–	RKAV Volendam	12	(2)
- * Club domestic league appearances and goals as of 18:34, 20 November 2026 (UTC)

Gerry Vlak (born 25 March 1996) is a Dutch footballer who plays as a midfielder for Tweede Divisie club RKAV Volendam.

Born and raised in Volendam, Vlak came through the youth system of FC Volendam and made 75 appearances for the club's first team between 2015 and 2020, scoring three goals. He was named in a preliminary Netherlands under-20 squad in 2015. After completing a master's degree in actuarial science, he joined IJsselmeervogels in 2020 and spent five seasons with Koninklijke HFC before returning in 2026 to RKAV Volendam, the amateur club where he had started. His younger brothers Jari and Dion are also footballers.

== Career ==
=== FC Volendam ===
Vlak began playing at RKAV Volendam, the amateur branch of the village's football club, before moving to the FC Volendam academy, a step both of his younger brothers later followed. He was promoted to the first-team squad for the 2015–16 season and made his professional debut on 21 August 2015, aged 19, when he started in place of the suspended Rafik El Hamdi in a 3–1 win away to Dordrecht that took Volendam to the top of the Eerste Divisie. In December 2015, NH described Kees Kwakman and Jack Tuijp as mentors to Vlak and fellow youngster Bert Steltenpool. Vlak said that he learned from the way Kwakman coached his team-mates and reacted after losing the ball, which he found very different from youth football.

A month after his debut, Vlak was one of 34 players named by coach Remy Reynierse in a preliminary Netherlands under-20 squad for matches against England, Germany and Turkey in Germany in October 2015. He was left out of the final squad, but later described his debut and the call-up as the best period of his time at Volendam.

Vlak made 20 league appearances in the 2017–18 season. On 16 February 2018, in his 41st first-team appearance, he scored his first goal for the club, placing a shot just inside the post from a Nick Doodeman cross to make it 3–0 in a 4–1 home win over Dordrecht. Two weeks later, he kept his composure at the byline and slid the ball across for Joey Veerman to score an 88th-minute winner against Eindhoven. On 20 April, he equalised against Jong Ajax just before half-time with a long-range shot that bounced past the goalkeeper, although Volendam went on to lose 2–1. Alongside his first-team appearances, he played more than 60 matches for the reserve side Jong FC Volendam in the Derde Divisie.

=== IJsselmeervogels ===
On 5 December 2019, Tweede Divisie club IJsselmeervogels announced that Vlak would join from Volendam the following summer on a one-year contract. Head coach André van Diermen described him as a technically skilled and clever midfielder with professional experience, and added that his Volendam roots gave him an understanding of the mentality of a fishing village, the same as Bunschoten. Vlak left Volendam in June 2020 after five seasons with the first team, in which he made 75 appearances and scored three goals. He said that it felt special to have played for the club of the village where he was born and raised, and that at IJsselmeervogels he could combine football with his new job as an actuary and expected to play more often, having seldom featured at Volendam in recent months.

Many matches in the 2020–21 season were cancelled because of the COVID-19 pandemic, and Vlak made only five official appearances for the club. On 3 February 2021, IJsselmeervogels announced that he would leave at the end of the season. Erwin van der Lugt of the club's technical committee said that talks about the midfield had led both sides to conclude that Vlak was a different type of midfielder, and that he had chosen to seek a new challenge.

=== Koninklijke HFC ===
Vlak joined Koninklijke HFC, also of the Tweede Divisie, for the 2021–22 season. On 7 December 2024, he faced his younger brother Dion, the goalkeeper of RKAV Volendam, in an official match for the first time, as HFC and RKAV drew 1–1. Vlak said that it felt strange to run out against a side containing so many players he had played alongside. He made 158 appearances for HFC over five seasons.

=== RKAV Volendam ===
On 13 April 2026, RKAV Volendam announced that Vlak would return to the club that summer. Ger Veerman, chairman of its technical committee, said that he was coming back after a fine career to the club where it had all begun. Vlak said that he always had a good feeling at RKAV, where he knew almost all of the players. In the first pre-season match of the 2026–27 season on 5 July, he started for RKAV against FC Volendam, with Dion keeping goal for the professionals in the second half. FC Volendam won 3–2, and Vlak said that his return felt like coming home.

== Personal life ==
Alongside his football career, Vlak studied econometrics at the University of Amsterdam. In 2019, he completed a master's degree in actuarial science and mathematical finance there, and after leaving FC Volendam he began working as an actuary.

His younger brother Jari Vlak is a midfielder and his youngest brother Dion is a goalkeeper. Their grandfather Gerrie Vlak played 28 matches for FC Volendam and died in June 2026.
