= Luca Blondeau =

Dutch footballer (born 2006)

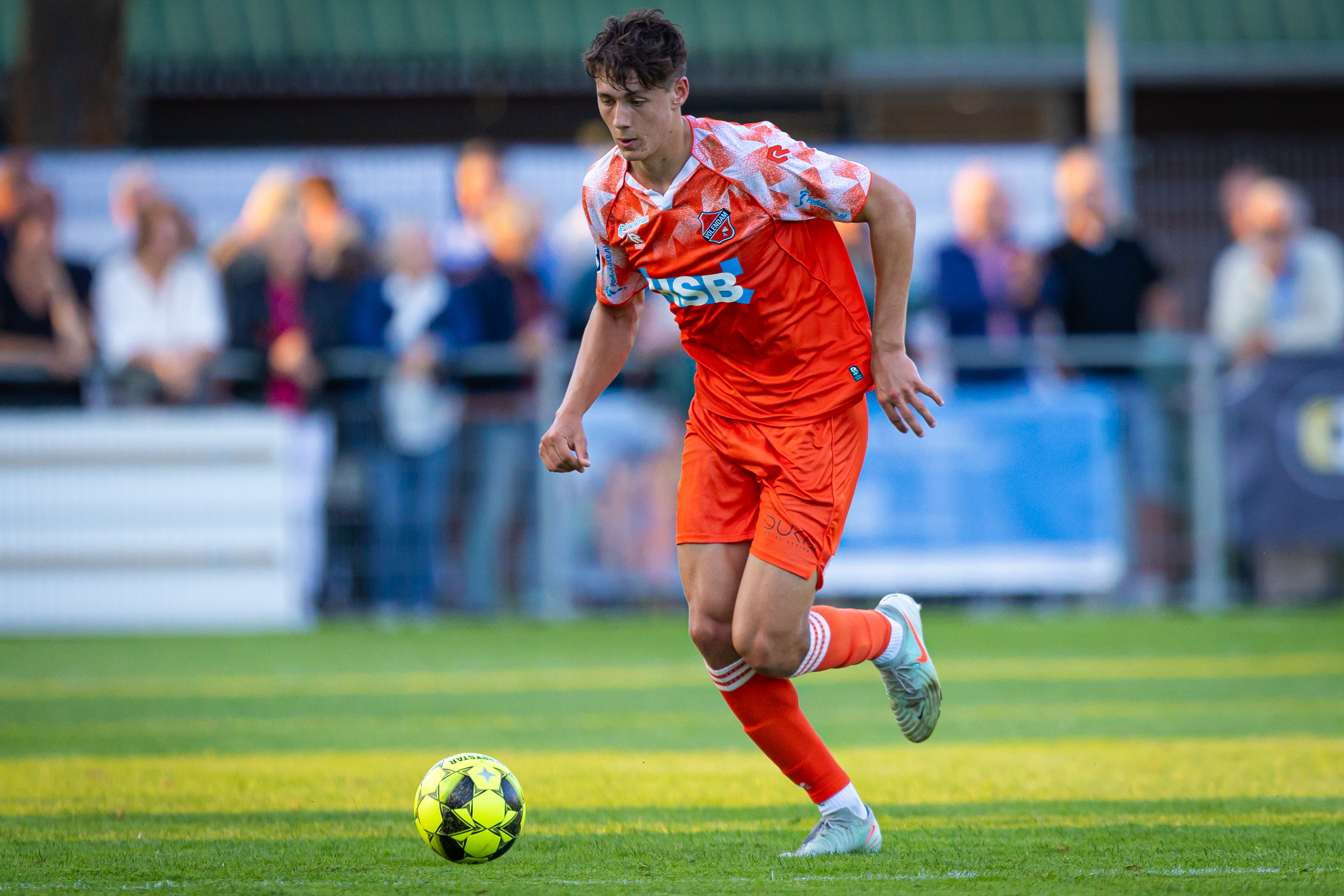

Personal information
- Date of birth: 11 February 2006 (age 20)
- Place of birth: Volendam, Netherlands
- Height: 1.94 m (6 ft 4 in)
- Position: Right-back

Team information
- Current team: Volendam
- Number: 25

Youth career
- –2022: RKAV Volendam
- 2022–2024: Volendam

Senior career*
Years	Team	Apps	(Gls)
2024–	Volendam	7	(0)
- * Club domestic league appearances and goals as of 23 April 2026

Luca Blondeau (born 11 February 2006) is a Dutch professional footballer who plays as a right-back for Eerste Divisie club Volendam.

== Club career ==
Blondeau joined FC Volendam from RKAV Volendam in June 2024.

On 31 August 2024, he made his first team debut as a substitute in a 4–0 win against TOP Oss in the Eerste Divisie.

== Personal life ==
Born in the Netherlands, Blondeau is eligible to represent Indonesia through his grandfather who comes from Jakarta.

== Career statistics ==
=== Club ===
As of match played 2 May 2025

Appearances and goals by club, season and competition
Club	Season	League			KNVB Cup		Other		Total	
Club	Season	Division	Apps	Goals	Apps	Goals	Apps	Goals	Apps	Goals
Volendam	2024–25	Eerste Divisie	5	0	0	0	0	0	5	0
Volendam	2025–26	Eredivisie	2	0	0	0	0	0	2	0
Career total			7	0	0	0	0	0	7	0

== Honours ==
Volendam

- Eerste Divisie: 2024–25
