= Ibrahim El Kadiri =

Footballer (born 2002)

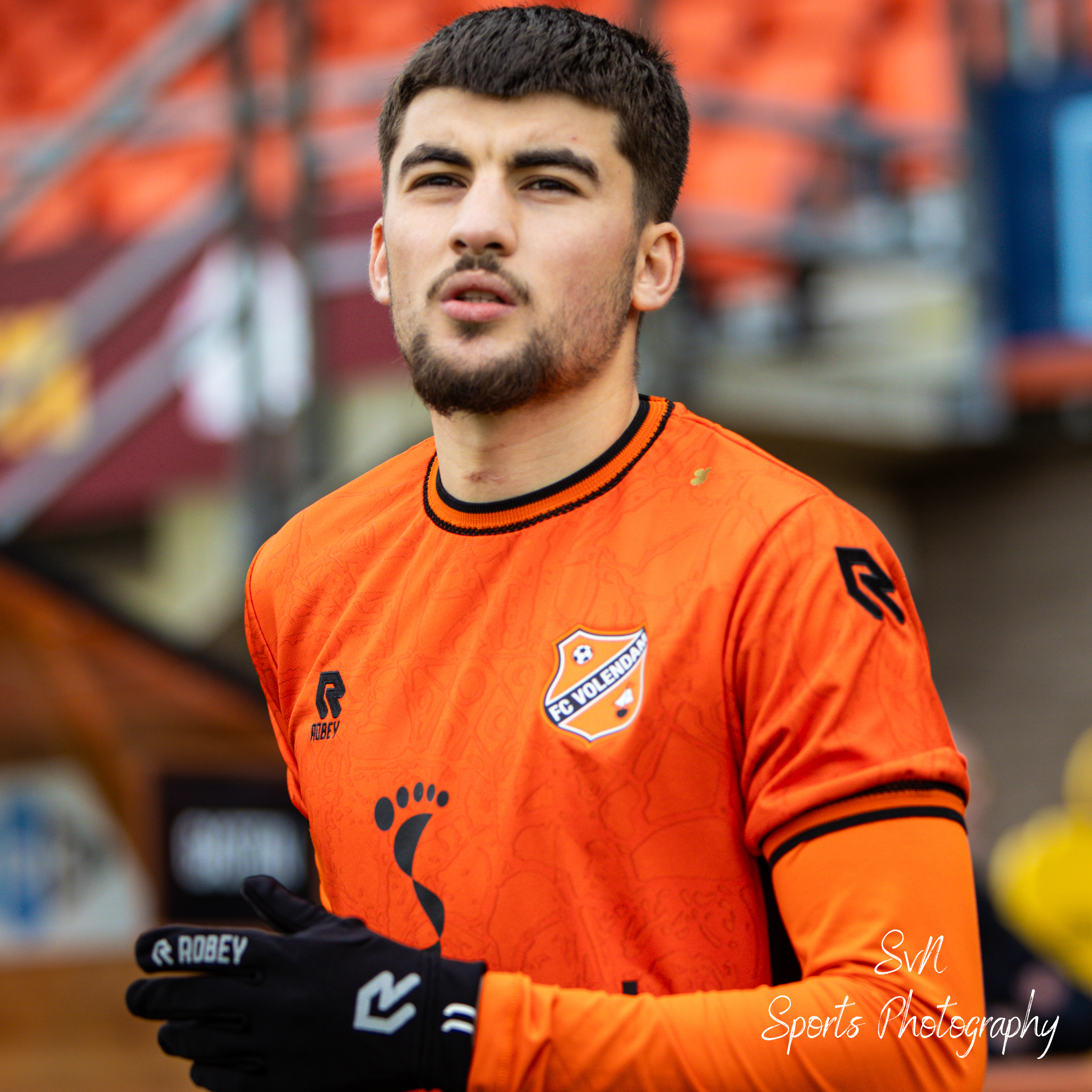
- El Kadiri with Volendam

Personal information
- Date of birth: 23 January 2002 (age 24)
- Place of birth: Amsterdam, Netherlands
- Height: 1.70 m (5 ft 7 in)
- Position: Left winger

Team information
- Current team: Darmstadt 98
- Number: 11

Youth career
- 2010–2012: AFC IJburg
- 2012–2013: WV-HEDW
- 2013–2017: Ajax
- 2018–2019: Utrecht

Senior career*
Years	Team	Apps	(Gls)
2019–2021	Jong Volendam	23	(3)
2019–2024	Volendam	89	(10)
2024–2026	De Graafschap	60	(12)
2026–	Darmstadt 98	0	(0)

International career
2022	Morocco U23	1	(0)
- * Club domestic league appearances and goals as of 28 April 2026

Ibrahim El Kadiri (born 23 January 2002) is a professional footballer who plays as a left winger for German 2. Bundesliga club Darmstadt 98. Born in the Netherlands, he has represented Morocco at youth level.

== Career ==
=== Volendam ===
El Kadiri played youth football for AFC IJburg, WV-HEDW, Ajax and FC Utrecht. In 2019, he signed a three-year contract with FC Volendam together with Samir Ben Sallam. He made his debut for Volendam on 29 November 2019, in a 3–1 home win over NEC Nijmegen. He came on as a substitute for Derry Murkin in the 76th minute, and even scored in injury time to secure his first ever professional goal. On 7 August 2020, he signed a contract extension with Volendam until 2024.

=== De Graafschap ===
On 1 July 2024, El Kadiri signed a two-year contract with an option for an additional year with Eerste Divisie club De Graafschap. On 11 August, he scored on his competitive debut for the club, netting the final goal in the 94th minute to complete a decisive 4–3 comeback victory against his former club Volendam on the first matchday of the season.

=== Darmstadt 98 ===
On 28 June 2026, El Kadiri signed with Darmstadt 98 in German 2. Bundesliga.

== Career statistics ==
As of match played 1 November 2024

Appearances and goals by club, season and competition
Club	Season	League			Cup		Other		Total	
Club	Season	Division	Apps	Goals	Apps	Goals	Apps	Goals	Apps	Goals
Jong Volendam	2019–20	Tweede Divisie	21	3	—		—		21	3
Jong Volendam	2021–22	Tweede Divisie	2	0	—		—		2	0
Jong Volendam	Total		23	3	—		—		23	3
Volendam	2019–20	Eerste Divisie	10	3	0	0	—		16	0
Volendam	2020–21	Eerste Divisie	32	3	1	0	1 (Note: Appearance(s) in Eerste Divisie promotion play-offs)	0	34	3
Volendam	2021–22	Eerste Divisie	26	4	1	0	—		27	4
Volendam	2022–23	Eredivisie	17	0	1	2	—		18	2
Volendam	2023–24	Eredivisie	4	0	0	0	—		4	0
Volendam	Total		89	10	3	2	1	0	93	12
De Graafschap	2024–25	Eerste Divisie	13	3	1	1	—		14	4
Career total			125	16	4	3	1	0	130	19
