= Ben Scholte =

Dutch football player

Personal information
- Date of birth: 10 August 2001 (age 25)
- Place of birth: Ter Apel, Netherlands
- Height: 1.85 m (6 ft 1 in)
- Position: Attacking midfielder

Youth career
- 2012–2020: Emmen

Senior career*
Years	Team	Apps	(Gls)
2020–2024	Emmen	61	(7)
2024–2025	Dordrecht	10	(1)
- * Club domestic league appearances and goals as of 29 August 2025

Ben Scholte (born 10 August 2001) is a Dutch professional footballer who plays as an attacking midfielder.

== Career ==
Scholte started at Fc Ter Apel 96.

Scholte made his debut for FC Emmen in the 2020–21 season on the 22 December 2020 against FC Utrecht appearing as a substitute for Nick Bakker in a 3–2 defeat at De Oude Meerdijk.

He played 19 league games and opened his scoring account for the club in the 2021–22, he scored an injury time winner in a 2–1 victory when playing FC Dordrecht on the 10 December 2021 at De Ouse Meerijk. The club would go on to win the Eerste Divisie and get promoted as champions. In June 2022, 10 years after first joining the club's youth academy, Scholte was given a new contract with FC Emmen.

In the summer of 2024, Scholte signed with Dordrecht for two seasons, with an option for a third. On 3 September 2025, the contract was mutually terminated.

== Honours ==
- Eerste Divisie

Winner: 2021–22
