= Dion Vlak =

Dutch footballer

Personal information
- Date of birth: 28 June 2001 (age 25)
- Place of birth: Volendam, Netherlands
- Position: Goalkeeper

Team information
- Current team: Volendam
- Number: 1

Youth career
- Volendam

Senior career*
Years	Team	Apps	(Gls)
2019–2022	Volendam II	12	(0)
2020–2022	Volendam	1	(0)
2022–2023	Spakenburg	1	(0)
2023–2025	RKAV Volendam	66	(0)
2025–	Volendam	0	(0)
- * Club domestic league appearances and goals as of 13 December 2025

Dion Vlak (born 28 June 2001) is a Dutch professional footballer who plays as a goalkeeper for Eerste Divisie club Volendam.

== Career ==
On 25 June 2025, Vlak returned to Volendam and signed a three-year contract.

== Personal life ==
His grandfather was Gerrie Vlak, who played 28 games for FC Volendam.
