= Jordi Blom =

Dutch footballer (born 2002)

Personal information
- Date of birth: 5 June 2002 (age 24)
- Place of birth: Amsterdam, Netherlands
- Position: Winger

Team information
- Current team: SV De Meer

Youth career
- SV De Meer
- 2010–2011: Ajax
- 2011–2021: WV-HEDW

Senior career*
Years	Team	Apps	(Gls)
2021–2023	Jong Volendam	51	(5)
2021–2023	Volendam	3	(0)
2023	Quick Boys	2	(0)
- * Club domestic league appearances and goals as of 25 September 2023

Jordi Blom (born 5 June 2002) is a Dutch football player. He plays as a winger (on either left or right side) for amateur club SV De Meer.

== Club career ==
Blom played futsal in the Dutch top-tier Eredivisie for ASV Lebo before switching to football. He signed a contract with Volendam on 8 June 2021, initially assigned to their Under-21 squad.

Blom made his professional debut for Volendam on 17 September 2021 in an Eerste Divisie game against VVV-Venlo. For the 2022–23 season, Volendam was promoted to the top-tier Eredivisie. Blom made his Eredivisie debut on 23 October 2022 against Heerenveen.

On 26 May 2023, Blom signed a one-year contract with Quick Boys, with a club option to extend for the second season. He had his contract terminated by mutual consent on 25 September 2023.

He returned to former club SV De Meer in 2025.
