= Daan Steur =

Dutch footballer (born 2002)

Personal information
- Date of birth: 6 August 2002 (age 24)
- Place of birth: Volendam, Netherlands
- Height: 1.90 m (6 ft 3 in)
- Position: Centre-back

Team information
- Current team: RKAV Volendam
- Number: 14

Youth career
- –2021: Volendam
- 2024–2025: Volendam

Senior career*
Years	Team	Apps	(Gls)
2021–2024	RKAV Volendam	80	(13)
2024–2026	Volendam	7	(0)
2025–2026	→ IJsselmeervogels (loan)	15	(0)
2026	→ RKAV Volendam (loan)	11	(1)
2026–	RKAV Volendam	6	(1)
- * Club domestic league appearances and goals as of 09:47, 25 September 2026 (UTC)

Daan Steur (born 6 August 2002) is a Dutch professional footballer who plays as a defender for Tweede Divisie side RKAV Volendam.

== Career ==
He is from Volendam in North Holland. He played for RKAV Volendam during the 2022–23 season. He was part of the RKAV Volendam team that earned promotion from the Derde Divisie A in May 2024 to the Tweede Divisie. That month, he joined FC Volendam.

He made his league debut for FC Volendam on 11 August 2024 in a 4–3 Eerste Divisie defeat away at De Graafschap.

On 25 April 2025, Steur agreed to join IJsselmeervogels on loan for the 2025–26 season.

On 29 January 2026, Steur returned to RKAV Volendam on a new loan until the end of the season. The deal was made permanent on 12 June 2026.

== Personal life ==
He is nicknamed 'The Shovel'. He studied accountancy at the University of Amsterdam. He has done charity work with children's health charities in Volendam.
