= Henk Veerman =

Dutch footballer (born 1991)

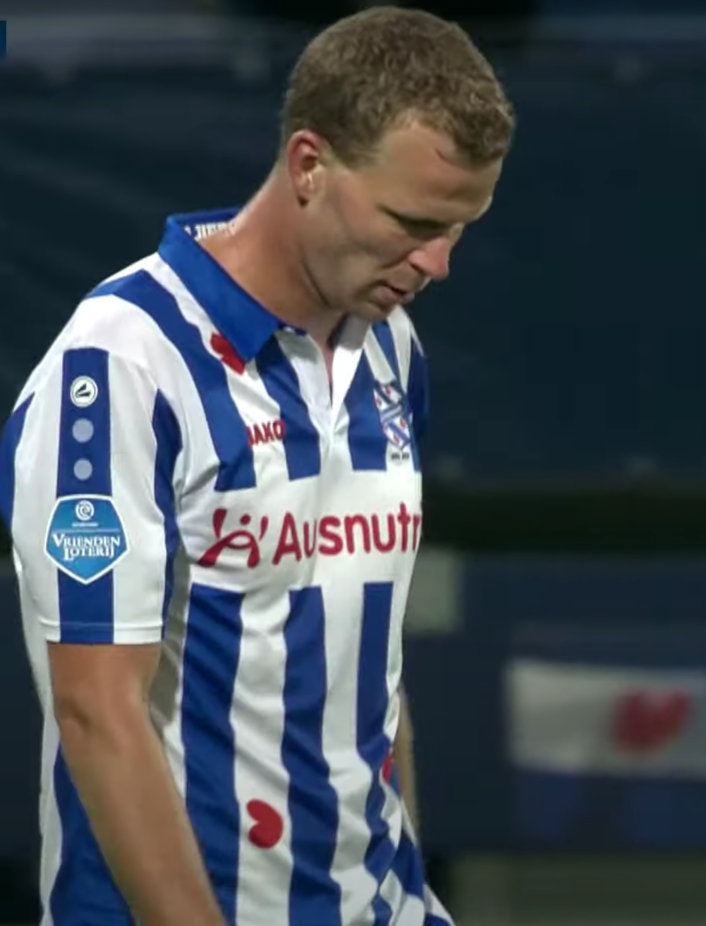

Personal information
- Full name: Hendrik Andreas Jacobus Veerman
- Date of birth: 26 February 1991 (age 35)
- Place of birth: Volendam, Netherlands
- Height: 2.01 m (6 ft 7 in)
- Position: Forward

Team information
- Current team: Volendam
- Number: 9

Youth career
- RKAV Volendam
- Volendam

Senior career*
Years	Team	Apps	(Gls)
2013–2015	Volendam	46	(22)
2015–2018	Heerenveen	94	(17)
2018–2020	St. Pauli	38	(17)
2020–2022	Heerenveen	51	(21)
2022	Utrecht	8	(1)
2022–	Volendam	90	(34)
2023–2024	→ ADO Den Haag (loan)	38	(23)
- * Club domestic league appearances and goals as of 19 May 2026

Hendrik Andreas Jacobus Veerman (born 26 February 1991) is a Dutch professional footballer who plays as a forward for Eerste Divisie club Volendam.

== Career ==
In August 2018, Veerman joined 2. Bundesliga side FC St. Pauli from SC Heerenveen signing a three-year contract until 2021.

On 26 January 2022, Veerman signed a 2.5-year contract with FC Utrecht.

On 31 July 2022, Veerman returned to his first professional club FC Volendam on a three-year contract. On 31 July 2023, Veerman moved to ADO Den Haag on a season-long loan with an option to buy.

== Personal life ==
Veerman is married and has two children. In 2021, he named his second child after SC Heerenveen teammate Joey Veerman, whom he bears no relation to.

== Career statistics ==
As of match played 25 May 2024

Appearances and goals by club, season and competition
Club	Season	League			Cup		Other		Total	
Club	Season	Division	Apps	Goals	Apps	Goals	Apps	Goals	Apps	Goals
FC Volendam	2013–14	Eerste Divisie	25	6	1	0	—		26	6
FC Volendam	2014–15	Eerste Divisie	21	16	3	3	—		24	19
FC Volendam	Total		46	22	4	3	—		50	25
SC Heerenveen	2014–15	Eredivisie	14	2	0	0	3 (Note: Appearance(s) in the Eredivisie playoffs)	0	17	2
SC Heerenveen	2015–16	Eredivisie	26	6	3	2	—		29	8
SC Heerenveen	2016–17	Eredivisie	23	5	2	2	1	0	26	7
SC Heerenveen	2017–18	Eredivisie	31	4	2	0	2	0	35	4
SC Heerenveen	Total		94	17	7	4	6	0	107	21
FC St. Pauli	2018–19	2. Bundesliga	16	6	1	0	—		17	6
FC St. Pauli	2019–20	2. Bundesliga	22	11	0	0	—		22	11
FC St. Pauli	Total		38	17	1	0	—		39	17
SC Heerenveen	2020–21	Eredivisie	31	14	4	0	—		35	14
SC Heerenveen	2021–22	Eredivisie	20	7	3	1	—		23	8
SC Heerenveen	Total		51	21	7	1	—		58	22
Utrecht	2021–22	Eredivisie	8	1	1	0	—		9	1
Volendam	2022–23	Eredivisie	29	4	1	0	—		30	4
ADO Den Haag (loan)	2023–24	Eerste Divisie	38	23	2	1	4 (Note: Appearances in promotion/relegation play-offs)	2	44	26
Career total			303	103	22	8	10	2	335	114

== Honours ==
Volendam

- Eerste Divisie: 2024–25

Individual

- Eerste Divisie top goalscorer: 2023–24, 2024–25
