= Jari Vlak =

Dutch footballer (born 1998)

Personal information
- Date of birth: 15 August 1998 (age 28)
- Place of birth: Volendam, Netherlands
- Height: 1.91 m (6 ft 3 in)
- Position: Midfielder

Team information
- Current team: Castellón
- Number: 25

Youth career
- –2017: Volendam

Senior career*
Years	Team	Apps	(Gls)
2018–2021	Jong Volendam	42	(3)
2018–2021	Volendam	71	(7)
2021–2024	Emmen	108	(13)
2024–2026	ADO Den Haag	85	(22)
2026–	Castellón	4	(0)
- * Club domestic league appearances and goals as of 17 October 2026

Jari Vlak (born 15 August 1998) is a Dutch professional footballer who plays as a midfielder for Segunda División club Castellón.

== Club career ==
Vlak made his Eerste Divisie debut for Volendam on 5 October 2018 in a game against RKC Waalwijk, as a starter.

On 11 January 2021, Vlak signed a three-and-a-half-year contract with Eredivisie club FC Emmen. He was eyed as a replacement of Michael Chacón, who had moved to Atlético Nacional.

On 1 February 2024, Vlak moved to ADO Den Haag and signed a contract until 30 June 2027. On 8 July 2026, he moved abroad and signed a three-year deal with Segunda División side Castellón.

== Personal life ==
His older brother Gerry Vlak is also a footballer. Their grandfather Gerrie Vlak, who played 28 games for FC Volendam, died in June 2026.

== Career statistics ==
As of match played 24 April 2026

Appearances and goals by club, season and competition
Club	Season	League			KNVB Cup		Europe		Other		Total	
Club	Season	Division	Apps	Goals	Apps	Goals	Apps	Goals	Apps	Goals	Apps	Goals
Jong Volendam	2015–16	Beloften Eredivisie	2	0	—		—		—		2	0
Jong Volendam	2016–17	Derde Divisie	1	0	—		—		—		1	0
Jong Volendam	2017–18	Derde Divisie	32	2	—		—		2 (Note: Appearances in promotion/relegation playoffs)	0	34	2
Jong Volendam	2018–19	Derde Divisie	7	1	—		—		—		7	1
Jong Volendam	Total		42	3	—		—		2	0	44	3
Volendam	2018–19	Eerste Divisie	26	1	1	0	—		—		27	1
Volendam	2019–20	Eerste Divisie	28	4	1	0	—		—		29	4
Volendam	2020–21	Eerste Divisie	17	2	0	0	—		—		17	2
Volendam	Total		71	7	2	0	—		—		73	7
Emmen	2020–21	Eredivisie	17	1	1	0	—		1	0	19	1
Emmen	2021–22	Eerste Divisie	38	4	2	0	—		—		40	4
Emmen	2022–23	Eredivisie	31	1	3	1	—		4	1	39	3
Emmen	2023–24	Eerste Divisie	22	7	0	0	—		—		22	7
Emmen	Total		108	13	6	1	—		5	1	119	15
ADO Den Haag	2023–24	Eerste Divisie	12	1	1	0	—		4	0	17	1
ADO Den Haag	2024–25	Eerste Divisie	38	10	1	0	—		2	0	41	10
ADO Den Haag	2025–26	Eerste Divisie	35	11	1	0	—		—		36	11
ADO Den Haag	Total		85	22	3	0	—		6	0	94	22
Career total			306	45	11	1	0	0	13	1	331	47

== Honours ==
ADO Den Haag

- Eerste Divisie: 2025–26
