= Dennis Vos =

Dutch footballer

Personal information
- Full name: Dennis Silvanus Vos
- Date of birth: 28 November 2001 (age 24)
- Place of birth: Geldrop, Netherlands
- Height: 1.81 m (5 ft 11 in)
- Position: Left-back

Youth career
- RKSV Nuenen
- 2010–2020: PSV

Senior career*
| Years | Team | Apps | (Gls) |
| 2020–2023 | Jong PSV | 76 | (2) |
| 2022–2023 | PSV | 1 | (0) |
| 2023–2026 | Emmen | 58 | (1) |
| 2025–2026 | → Helmond Sport (loan) | 29 | (0) |

International career
| 2015–2016 | Netherlands U15 | 5 | (0) |
| 2018 | Netherlands U18 | 1 | (0) |
| 2019 | Netherlands U19 | 1 | (0) |
- * Club domestic league appearances and goals as of 28 April 2026

Dennis Silvanus Vos (born 28 November 2001) is a Dutch professional footballer who plays as a left-back.

== Career ==
=== PSV ===
Vos joined PSV's academy in 2010 from RKSV Nuenen. He signed his first professional contract in June 2019; a three-year deal. He made his debut for Jong PSV on 26 August 2020 in a 6–1 loss to Excelsior in the Eerste Divisie, starting at left-back. He scored his first goal on 23 October in a 2–1 defeat against De Graafschap.

Vos signed a one-year contract extension February 2022, keeping him at the club until 2023. At that point, he had become the team captain of Jong PSV under head coach Ruud van Nistelrooy.

On 15 May 2022, Vos made his debut for the PSV first team on the final matchday of the 2021–22 Eredivisie season, coming on as a half-time substitute for Philipp Max in a 2–1 victory against PEC Zwolle.

=== FC Emmen ===
In January 2023, Vos signed for FC Emmen on an eighteen-month contract with the option for a further year.

==== Loan to Helmond Sport ====
On 28 August 2025, Vos moved on loan to Helmond Sport.

== Career statistics ==
As of 27 January 2023

Appearances and goals by club, season and competition
| Club | Season | League | | | Cup | | Continental | | Other | | Total | |
| Club | Season | Division | Apps | Goals | Apps | Goals | Apps | Goals | Apps | Goals | Apps | Goals |
|---|---|---|---|---|---|---|---|---|---|---|---|---|
| Jong PSV | 2020–21 | Eerste Divisie | 22 | 2 | — | | — | | — | | 22 | 2 |
| Jong PSV | 2021–22 | Eerste Divisie | 33 | 0 | — | | — | | — | | 33 | 0 |
| Jong PSV | 2022–23 | Eerste Divisie | 21 | 0 | — | | — | | — | | 21 | 0 |
| Jong PSV | Total | | 76 | 2 | — | | — | | — | | 76 | 2 |
| PSV | 2021–22 | Eredivisie | 1 | 0 | 0 | 0 | 0 | 0 | 0 | 0 | 1 | 0 |
| Career total | | | 77 | 2 | 0 | 0 | 0 | 0 | 0 | 0 | 77 | 2 |
