= Joey Antonioli =

Dutch footballer (born 2003)

Personal information
- Date of birth: 15 December 2003 (age 22)
- Place of birth: Woerden, Netherlands
- Position: Midfielder

Team information
- Current team: Noordwijk
- Number: 19

Youth career
- CSW
- 2012–2015: Ajax
- 2015–2016: AFC
- 2016–2021: Volendam
- 2024–2025: Twente/Heracles Academy

Senior career*
Years	Team	Apps	(Gls)
2020–2024	Jong Volendam	43	(7)
2020–2024	Volendam	12	(0)
2025–	Noordwijk	10	(1)
- * Club domestic league appearances and goals as of 14:41, 7 January 2026 (UTC)

Joey Antonioli (born 15 December 2003) is a Dutch professional footballer who plays as a midfielder for Derde Divisie club Noordwijk.

== Club career ==
After playing for four seasons with Volendam in Eerste Divisie and then Eredivisie, on 2 September 2024 Antonioli decided to continue his career at the Under-21 squad of Twente/Heracles Academy, an academy jointly run by FC Twente and Heracles Almelo.

In July 2025, Antonioli joined Derde Divisie club Noordwijk.

== Personal life ==
Antonioli is of Italian descent through a grandfather.
