= Mio Backhaus =

German footballer (born 2004)

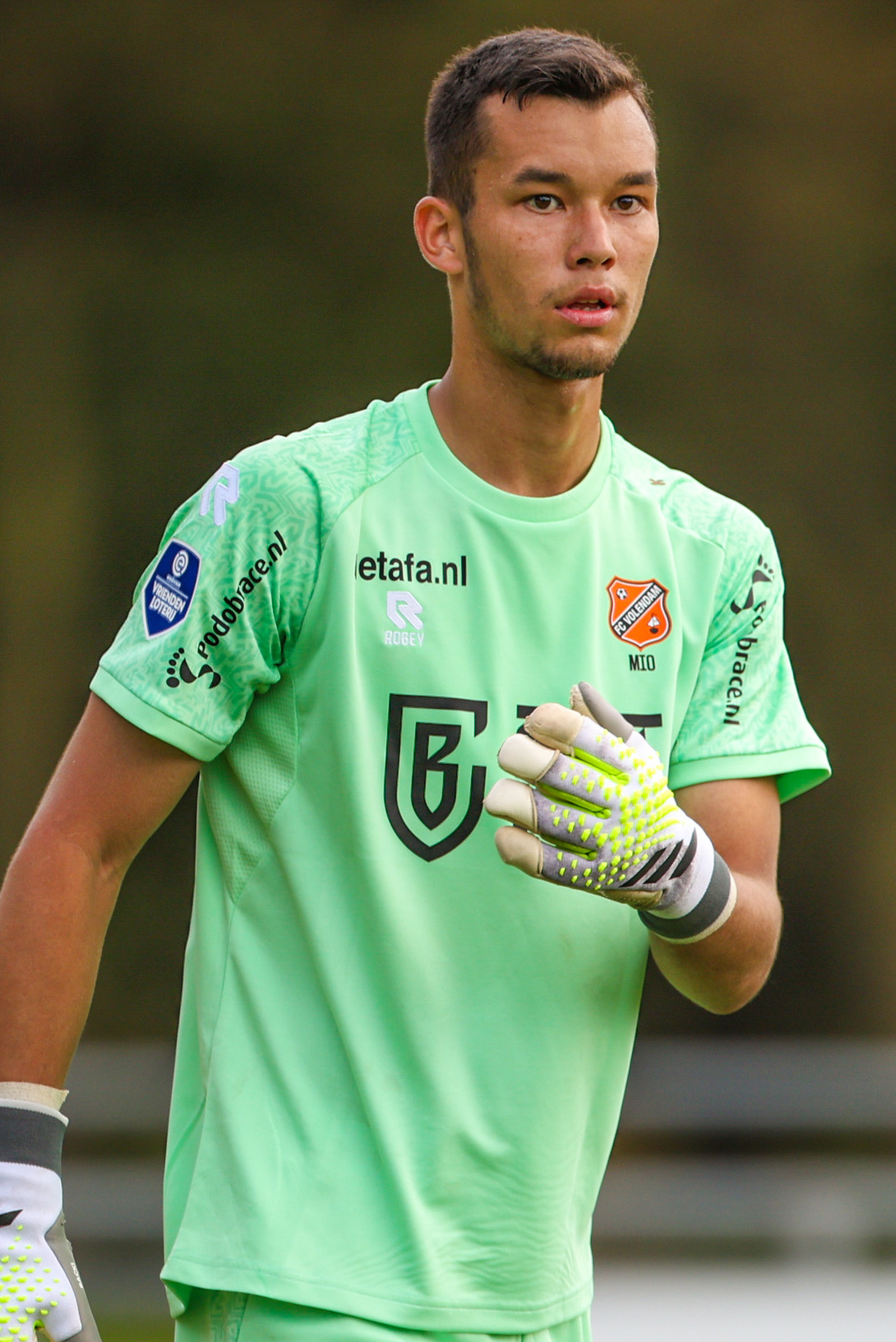
- Backhaus with FC Volendam

Personal information
- Date of birth: 16 April 2004 (age 22)
- Place of birth: Mönchengladbach, Germany
- Height: 1.94 m (6 ft 4 in)
- Position: Goalkeeper

Team information
- Current team: SC Freiburg
- Number: 1

Youth career
- 2015–2017: Kawasaki Frontale
- 2017–2018: Alemannia Aachen
- 2018–2021: Werder Bremen

Senior career*
Years	Team	Apps	(Gls)
2021–2026	Werder Bremen	32	(0)
2022–2023	Werder Bremen II	14	(0)
2023–2024	→ FC Volendam (loan)	33	(0)
2026–	SC Freiburg	8	(0)

International career^{‡}
2018	Japan U15	1	(0)
2019	Germany U15	1	(0)
2019–2020	Germany U16	4	(0)
2021–2022	Germany U18	4	(0)
2022–2023	Germany U19	2	(0)
2023–2025	Germany U20	8	(0)
2025–	Germany U21	7	(0)
- * Club domestic league appearances and goals as of 17:30, 31 October 2026 (UTC) ‡ National team caps and goals as of 18:40, 6 October 2026 (UTC)

Mio Backhaus (長田 澪, Nagata Mio; born 16 April 2004), also known as Mio Nagata, is a German professional footballer who plays as a goalkeeper for Bundesliga club SC Freiburg. He has represented both Germany and Japan at underage level.

== Club career ==
From Baesweiler, in Aachen, Backhaus joined the Werder Bremen youth team in 2018, having previously been at Alemannia Aachen. He featured for the Bremen second team in the Regionalliga Nord as a teenager, and played for the German age-group teams, up to representing the U19 team. He agreed a new contract with Bremen tying him to the club until 2026.

In July 2023, Backhaus joined FC Volendam on a season-long loan from Werder Bremen, in order to get first-team minutes. Volendam’s goalkeeper from the previous two seasons, Filip Stanković had also been a loanee, but had returned to Inter Milan from the Eredivisie club. During his season with Volendam he made the most saves (176) of any goalkeeper in the division.

On 23 May 2026, SC Freiburg announced that Backhaus will join the club next season, with the details of the contract being undisclosed.

== International career ==
Backhaus has represented Germany internationally at youth levels since 2019, winning 12 international caps in the Germany U15, Germany U16, Germany U18 and Germany U19 sides (He had played for the U15 team of Japan in 2018). In early 2023, the head coach of Japan Hajime Moriyasu visited him with representatives from the Japanese FA whilst he was in training in Bremen according to Werder Bremen managing director for sport, Clemens Fritz. In March 2025, he played for the Germany national under-20 football team, starting the match and keeping a clean sheet as they beat Czechia U20 1-0.

== Personal life ==
Backhaus was born in Germany to a German father and a Japanese mother.

== Career statistics ==
As of matches played 31 October 2026

Appearances and goals by club, season and competition
Club	Season	League			Cup		Europe		Other		Total	
Club	Season	Division	Apps	Goals	Apps	Goals	Apps	Goals	Apps	Goals	Apps	Goals
Werder Bremen	2021–22	2. Bundesliga	0	0	0	0	—		—		0	0
Werder Bremen	2022–23	Bundesliga	0	0	0	0	—		—		0	0
Werder Bremen	2024–25	Bundesliga	0	0	0	0	—		—		0	0
Werder Bremen	2025–26	Bundesliga	32	0	0	0	—		—		32	0
Werder Bremen	Total		32	0	0	0	—		—		32	0
Werder Bremen II	2021–22	Regionalliga Nord	5	0	—		—		—		5	0
Werder Bremen II	2022–23	Regionalliga Nord	10	0	—		—		—		10	0
Werder Bremen II	Total		15	0	—		—		—		15	0
FC Volendam (loan)	2023–24	Eredivisie	33	0	1	0	—		—		34	0
SC Freiburg	2026–27	Bundesliga	8	0	1	0	4 (Note: Appearances in UEFA Conference League)	0	—		13	0
Career total			88	0	2	0	4	0	0	0	94	0
