= Flip Klomp =

Dutch footballer (born 2001)

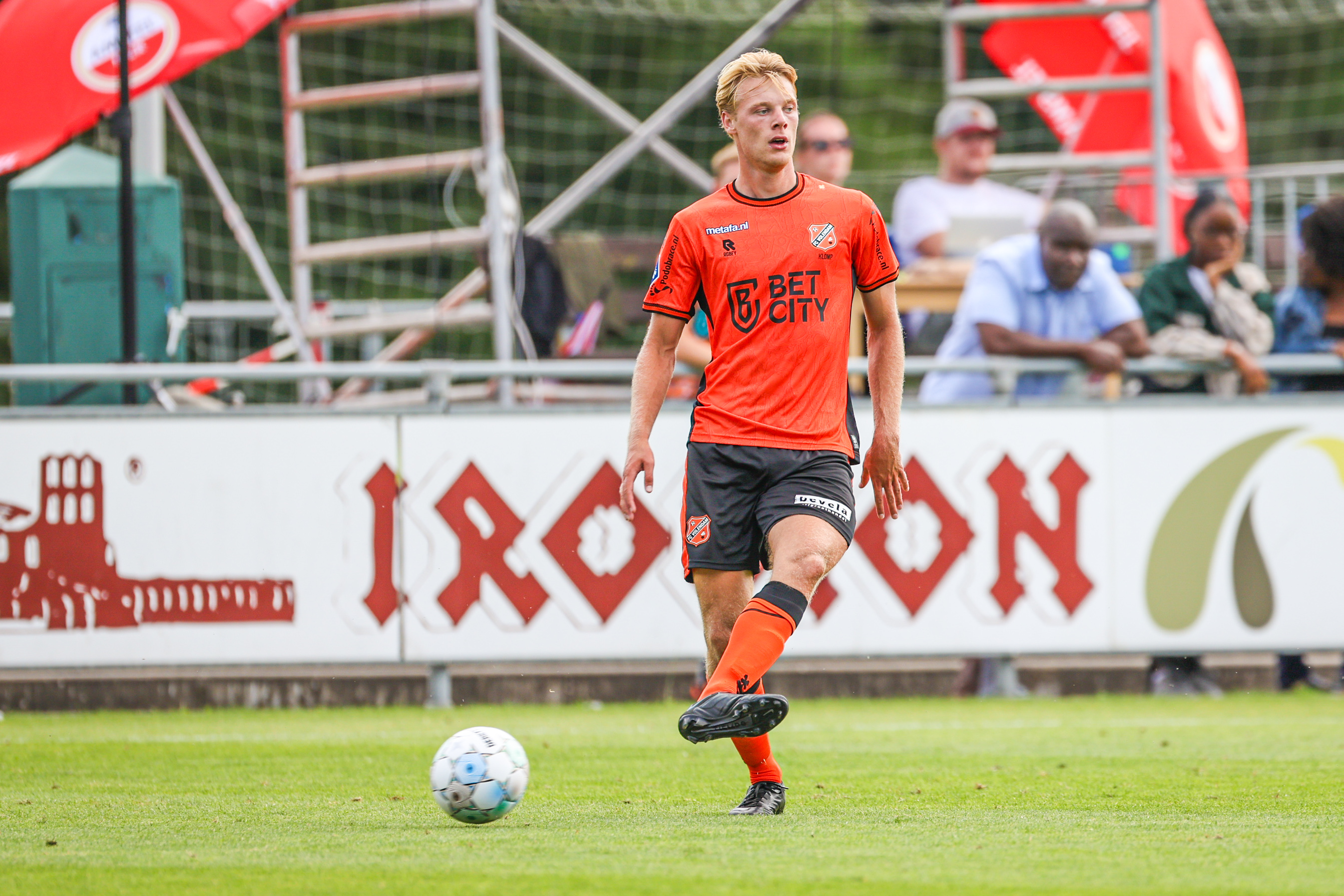

Personal information
- Date of birth: 18 October 2001 (age 25)
- Place of birth: Alkmaar, Netherlands
- Height: 1.85 m (6 ft 1 in)
- Position: Central midfielder

Team information
- Current team: Koninklijke HFC
- Number: 7

Youth career
- 2017–2018: Sporting Martinus
- 2018–2019: RODA '23
- 2019–2020: AFC
- 2020–2021: Ajax Amateurs

College career
Years	Team	Apps	(Gls)
2021–2023	VCU Rams	35	(16)

Senior career*
Years	Team	Apps	(Gls)
2023–	Jong Volendam	13	(0)
2023–	Volendam	3	(0)
2024	→ Koninklijke HFC (loan)	16	(1)
2024–2025	→ Spakenburg (loan)	25	(0)
2025–	Koninklijke HFC	43	(0)
- * Club domestic league appearances and goals as of 11:22, 24 October 2026 (UTC)

Flip Klomp (born 18 October 2001) is a Dutch football player who plays as a central midfielder for Tweede Divisie club Koninklijke HFC.

== Club career ==
Klomp studied business administration in the Virginia Commonwealth University in the US for a year and a half. On 24 January 2023, Klomp signed a two-and-a-half-year contract with Volendam.

He made his Eredivisie debut for Volendam on 29 January 2023 in a game against Groningen.

On 26 January 2024, Klomp was loaned to Koninklijke HFC for the remainder of the 2023–24 season.
