= Imran Nazih =

Moroccan footballer

- Nazih in 2023

Personal information
- Date of birth: 25 January 2006 (age 20)
- Place of birth: Amsterdam, Netherlands
- Height: 1.78 m (5 ft 10 in)
- Position: Attacking midfielder

Team information
- Current team: NAC Breda
- Number: 34

Youth career
- Nieuw-West United
- 2016–2017: Zeeburgia
- 2017–2019: Ajax
- 2019–2020: Zeeburgia
- 2020–2025: Volendam
- 2025–: NAC Breda

Senior career*
Years	Team	Apps	(Gls)
2021–2023	Jong Volendam	32	(1)
2022–2025	Volendam	9	(0)
2026–	NAC Breda	7	(1)

International career^{‡}
2021–2022	Netherlands U16	4	(0)
2022	Netherlands U17	2	(0)
2023	Morocco U17	7	(1)
- * Club domestic league appearances and goals as of 3 October 2026 ‡ National team caps and goals as of 19:41, 21 November 2024 (UTC)

Imran Nazih (Berber languages: ⵄⵎⵔⴰⵏ ⵏⴰⵣⵉⵀ;Arabic: عمران نزيه; born 25 January 2006) is a professional footballer who plays as a midfielder for Eerste Divisie club NAC Breda. Born in the Netherlands, he is a youth international for Morocco.

== Club career ==
Nazih is a youth product of Nieuw-West United, Zeeburgia, Ajax and Volendam. He began his senior career with Volendam's reserves in 2021, and signed his first professional contract with the club on 11 May 2022 at the age of 16 until 2025. He made his professional debut with Volendam as a late substitute in a 7–1 Eredivisie loss to PSV on 31 August 2022.

On 19 August 2026, Nazih signed a two-year contract (with a club option to extend for two more years) with NAC Breda, where he played for the Under-21 squad in the 2025–26 season.

== Personal life ==
Born in the Netherlands, Nazih is of Moroccan descent. He played for the Netherlands U16s four times. He was called up to a training camp for the Morocco U17s in May 2022. He was part of the Morocco U17 squad called up for the 2023 FIFA U-17 World Cup.
