= Déron Payne =

Trinidadian footballer (born 2002)

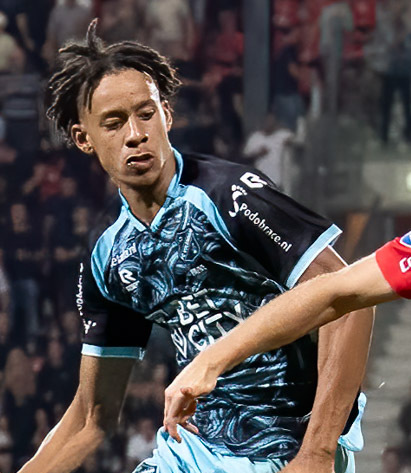
- Payne with Volendam in 2023

Personal information
- Date of birth: 25 September 2002 (age 24)
- Place of birth: Hoofddorp, Netherlands
- Height: 1.82 m (6 ft 0 in)
- Position: Right-back

Team information
- Current team: Volendam
- Number: 2

Youth career
- –2013: FC VVC
- 2013–2017: AZ
- 2017–2021: Koninklijke HFC

Senior career*
Years	Team	Apps	(Gls)
2020–2022	Koninklijke HFC	23	(0)
2022–2023	Jong Volendam	24	(0)
2022–	Volendam	64	(1)

International career^{‡}
2025–	Trinidad and Tobago	1	(0)
- * Club domestic league appearances and goals as of 19 May 2026 ‡ National team caps and goals as of 11 October 2025

Déron Payne (born 25 September 2002) is a professional footballer who plays as a right-back for Eerste Divisie club Volendam. Born in the Netherlands, he plays for the Trinidad and Tobago national team.

== Career ==
On 18 May 2022, Payne signed a three-year contract with Volendam and was initially assigned to their Under-21 squad.

He made his Eredivisie debut for Volendam on 6 November 2022 in a game against Feyenoord.

== Personal life ==
Payne was born in the Netherlands to a Trinidadian father and Dutch mother. He was called up to the Trinidad and Tobago national team for a set of 2026 FIFA World Cup qualification – CONCACAF third round matches in October 2025.

Payne is the younger brother of the footballer Desevio Payne.
