= Kras Stadion =

Dutch football stadium

Coordinates: 52°29′40″N 5°03′59″E

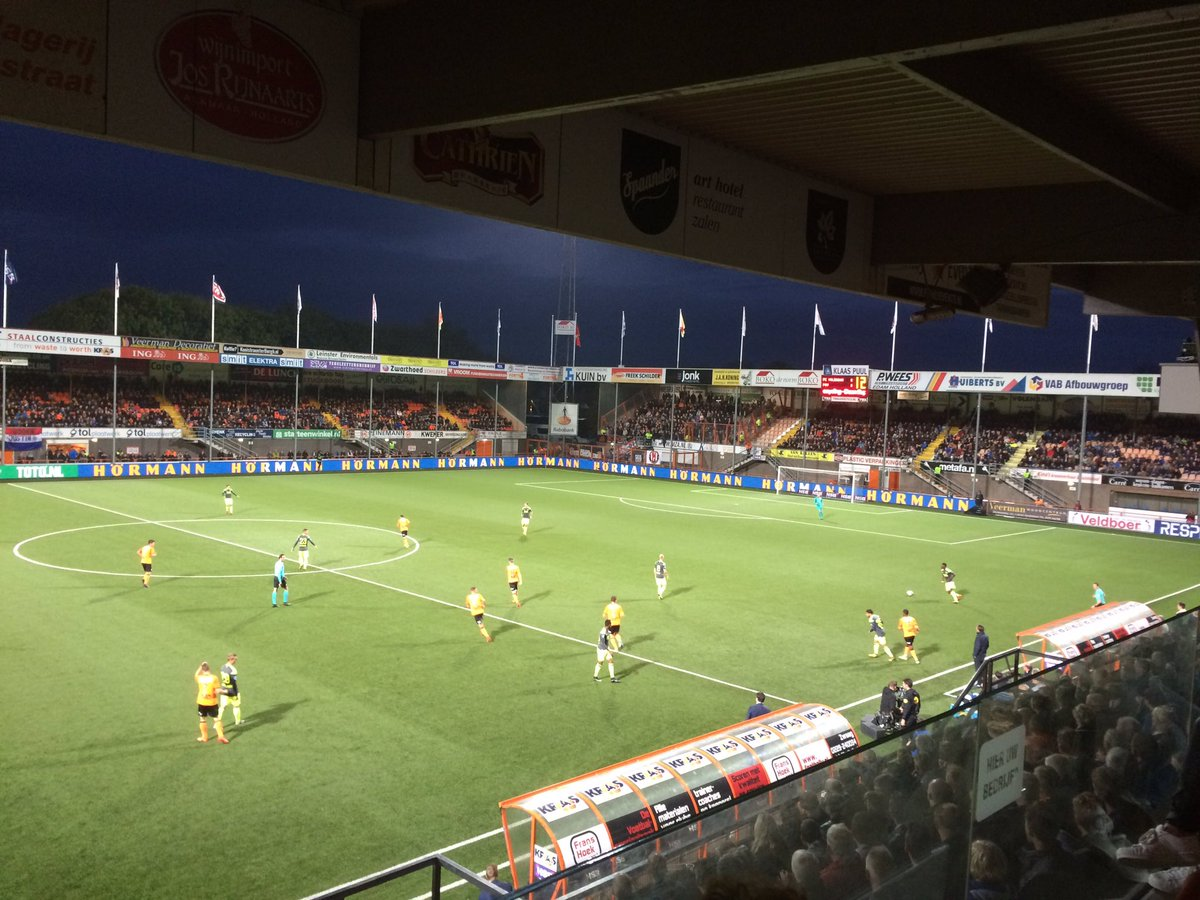
Kras Stadion

The Kras Stadion (Dutch pronunciation: [ˈkrɑˌstaːdijɔn]) (Note: In isolation, Kras is pronounced [krɑs].) is a multi-purpose stadium in Volendam, Netherlands. It is currently used mostly for football matches and is the home stadium of FC Volendam. The stadium is able to hold 6,984 people and was built in 1975.
