= RKAV Volendam =

Dutch football club

- Full name: Rooms Katholieke Amateur Voetbalvereniging
- Nickname: RKAV
- Founded: 1 June 1920; 106 years ago
- Ground: Hein Koning Stadion, Volendam
- Chairman: Vincent Gruwèl
- Manager: Ted Verdonkschot
- League: Tweede Divisie
- 2025–26: Tweede Divisie, 13th of 18
Home colours	Away colours

Rooms Katholieke Amateur Voetbalvereniging (Dutch: Roman Catholic Amateur Football Club), abbreviated as RKAV Volendam, is a Dutch football team. It competes in the Tweede Divisie, after reaching promotion from the Derde Divisie A in 2024.

== History ==
RKAV was founded in 1920 Volendam as Victoria. It soon changed its name to RKSV Volendam (with an S for Sports Club). Initially, the club participated in the Catholic football league. It joined the KNVB in 1940. In July 1977 the club split into the professional FC Volendam and the Hoofdklasse amateur-team RKAV Volendam.

RKAV relegated from the Hoofdklasse after the 2014–2015 season. Preparing for the 2017-18 Eerste Klasse season, RKAV beat Hoofdklasse-side AFC Ajax (amateurs), 2–1.

== Current squad ==
As of 2 November 2026

Note: Flags indicate national team as defined under FIFA eligibility rules; some limited exceptions apply. Players may hold more than one non-FIFA nationality.

No.	Pos.	Nation	Player
1	GK	NED	Dominique Witte
2	DF	NED	Rob Tol
3	DF	NED	Stef Schokker
4	DF	NED	Lex Veerman
5	MF	NED	Gerry Vlak
6	MF	NED	Pieter Kroon
7	FW	NED	Roy Tol
8	MF	NED	Daan van Baarsen
9	FW	NED	Azeddine Sout
10	MF	NED	Nick Runderkamp
11	FW	FRA	Ilias Boudouni
13	DF	NED	Perry Karregat
14	DF	NED	Daan Steur
15	DF	NED	Stan Veerman

No.	Pos.	Nation	Player
16	MF	NED	Levi van Duijl
17	GK	NED	Leon Kwakman
18	MF	NED	Timo Schokker
20	FW	NED	Dave Zwarthoed
21	DF	NED	Tom Smit
22	GK	NED	Jan Kluessien
25	MF	NED	Daan Sier
26	FW	NED	Patrick Plugboer
27	DF	NED	Wouter Kwakman
28	FW	ARU	Arenchelo Leito
29	GK	NED	Joey van der Plas
30	DF	NED	Waleed Aït Abdellah
77	FW	NED	Mitchi Huijsman
