= List of Dutch football transfers summer 2025 =

This is a list of Dutch football transfers for the 2025 summer transfer window. Only transfers featuring Eredivisie are listed.

== Eredivisie ==
Note: Flags indicate national team as has been defined under FIFA eligibility rules. Players may hold more than one non-FIFA nationality.

=== PSV ===
In:

No.	Pos.	Nation	Player
1	GK	NED	Nick Olij (from Sparta Rotterdam)
3	DF	ESP	Yarek Gasiorowski (from (Spain) Valencia)
7	FW	NED	Ruben van Bommel (from AZ)
10	MF	GER	Paul Wanner (from (Germany) Bayern Munich, previously on loan at (Germany) 1. FC Heidenheim)
14	FW	FRA	Alassane Pléa (from (Germany) Borussia Mönchengladbach)
25	DF	FRA	Kiliann Sildillia (from (Germany) SC Freiburg)
27	FW	ROU	Dennis Man (from (Italy) Parma)
32	GK	CZE	Matěj Kovář (on loan from (Germany) Bayer Leverkusen)

Out:

No.	Pos.	Nation	Player
1	GK	ARG	Walter Benítez (to (England) Crystal Palace)
2	DF	NED	Rick Karsdorp (free agent)
3	DF	NED	Tyrell Malacia (loan return to (England) Manchester United)
7	MF	USA	Malik Tillman (to (Germany) Bayer Leverkusen)
9	FW	NED	Luuk de Jong (to (Portugal) Porto)
10	FW	NED	Noa Lang (to (Italy) Napoli)
11	FW	BEL	Johan Bakayoko (to (Germany) RB Leipzig)
16	GK	NED	Joël Drommel (on loan to Sparta Rotterdam)
18	DF	FRA	Olivier Boscagli (to (England) Brighton & Hove Albion)
27	FW	ESP	Lucas Pérez (free agent)
37	MF	USA	Richard Ledezma (to (Mexico) Guadalajara)

=== Ajax ===
In:

No.	Pos.	Nation	Player
1	GK	CZE	Vítězslav Jaroš (on loan from (England) Liverpool)
4	DF	JPN	Ko Itakura (from (Germany) Borussia Mönchengladbach)
7	FW	ESP	Raúl Moro (from (Spain) Valladolid)
10	MF	ISR	Oscar Gloukh (from (Austria) Red Bull Salzburg)
12	GK	NED	Joeri Heerkens (from (Czech Republic) Sparta Prague)

Out:

No.	Pos.	Nation	Player
4	DF	NED	Jorrel Hato (to (England) Chelsea)
6	MF	ENG	Jordan Henderson (to (England) Brentford)
12	GK	NED	Jay Gorter (to (Cyprus) Pafos)
16	GK	BRA	Matheus (loan return to (Portugal) Braga)
24	DF	ITA	Daniele Rugani (loan return to (Italy) Juventus)
27	FW	NED	Amourricho van Axel Dongen (on loan to Heerenveen)
29	FW	DEN	Christian Rasmussen (to (Germany) Fortuna Düsseldorf)
—	MF	NOR	Sivert Mannsverk (on loan to (Czech Republic) Sparta Prague, previously on loan at (Wales) Cardiff City)
—	FW	ENG	Chuba Akpom (on loan to (England) Ipswich Town, previously on loan at (France) Lille)
—	DF	CRO	Borna Sosa (to (England) Crystal Palace, previously on loan at (Italy) Torino)
—	DF	CRO	Jakov Medić (to (England) Norwich City, previously on loan at (Germany) VfL Bochum)
—	MF	ISL	Kristian Hlynsson (to Twente, previously on loan at Sparta Rotterdam)
—	FW	POR	Carlos Forbs (to (Belgium) Club Brugge, previously on loan at (England) Wolverhampton Wanderers)

=== Feyenoord ===
In:

No.	Pos.	Nation	Player
4	DF	JPN	Tsuyoshi Watanabe (from (Belgium) Gent)
11	FW	POR	Gonçalo Borges (from (Portugal) Porto)
14	MF	NED	Sem Steijn (from Twente)
15	DF	AUS	Jordan Bos (from (Belgium) Westerlo)
17	FW	DEN	Casper Tengstedt (from (Portugal) Benfica, previously on loan at (Italy) Hellas Verona)
21	DF	BIH	Anel Ahmedhodžić (from (England) Sheffield United)
27	FW	MLI	Gaoussou Diarra (from (Turkey) İstanbulspor)
39	GK	IRL	Liam Bossin (from Dordrecht, previously on loan)
40	MF	NED	Luciano Valente (from Groningen)

Out:

No.	Pos.	Nation	Player
6	MF	ALG	Ramiz Zerrouki (on loan to Twente)
11	DF	NED	Quilindschy Hartman (to (England) Burnley)
14	FW	BRA	Igor Paixão (to (France) Marseille)
15	DF	URU	Facundo González (loan return to (Italy) Juventus)
16	DF	ESP	Hugo Bueno (loan return to (England) Wolverhampton Wanderers)
17	MF	CRO	Luka Ivanušec (on loan to (Greece) PAOK)
21	GK	BUL	Plamen Andreev (on loan to (Spain) Racing Santander)
27	MF	NED	Antoni Milambo (to (England) Brentford)
31	FW	MEX	Stephano Carrillo (on loan to Dordrecht)
33	DF	SVK	Dávid Hancko (to (Spain) Atlético Madrid)
38	FW	GHA	Ibrahim Osman (loan return to (England) Brighton & Hove Albion)
—	MF	NED	Gjivai Zechiël (on loan to Utrecht, previously on loan at Sparta Rotterdam)
—	GK	NED	Mikki van Sas (to (England) Wycombe Wanderers, previously on loan at Vitesse)
—	DF	PER	Marcos López (to (Denmark) Copenhagen, previously on loan)
—	DF	NED	Mimeirhel Benita (to Heracles Almelo, previously on loan)
—	MF	MAR	Ilias Sebaoui (to (Belgium) Sint-Truiden, previously on loan at Heerenveen)
—	MF	NED	Thomas van den Belt (to Twente, previously on loan at (Spain) Castellón)
—	FW	NED	Devin Haen (to Willem II, previously on loan at Dordrecht)

=== Utrecht ===
In:

No.	Pos.	Nation	Player
6	MF	NED	Davy van den Berg (from PEC Zwolle)
10	FW	FRA	Yoann Cathline (from (France) Lorient, previously on loan)
17	FW	TUR	Emirhan Demircan (from (Germany) Bayern Munich II)
20	MF	NED	Dani de Wit (from (Germany) VfL Bochum)
21	MF	NED	Gjivai Zechiël (on loan from Feyenoord, previously on loan at Sparta Rotterdam)
44	DF	NED	Mike Eerdhuijzen (from Sparta Rotterdam)
55	DF	ENG	Derry Murkin (from (Germany) Schalke 04)
91	FW	CIV	Sébastien Haller (from (Germany) Borussia Dortmund, previously on loan)
—	DF	NED	Neville Ogidi Nwankwo (from Quick Boys)

Out:

No.	Pos.	Nation	Player
18	MF	NED	Jens Toornstra (to Sparta Rotterdam)
19	FW	BEL	Anthony Descotte (loan return to (Belgium) Charleroi)
21	MF	USA	Paxten Aaronson (loan return to (Germany) Eintracht Frankfurt)
32	GK	NED	Tom de Graaff (on loan to PEC Zwolle)
—	GK	NED	Mattijs Branderhorst (to Fortuna Sittard, previously on loan)
—	DF	NED	Neville Ogidi Nwankwo (on loan to Telstar)

=== AZ ===
In:

No.	Pos.	Nation	Player
15	DF	MEX	Mateo Chávez (from (Mexico) Guadalajara)
17	FW	DEN	Isak Jensen (from (Denmark) Viborg)

Out:

No.	Pos.	Nation	Player
4	DF	NED	Bruno Martins Indi (to Sparta Rotterdam)
7	FW	NED	Ruben van Bommel (to PSV)
13	GK	ESP	Sem Westerveld (on loan to MVV)
14	MF	SRB	Kristijan Belić (on loan to (Israel) Maccabi Tel Aviv)
17	FW	NED	Jayden Addai (to (Italy) Como)
18	DF	NOR	David Møller Wolfe (to (England) Wolverhampton Wanderers)
21	FW	NED	Ernest Poku (to (Germany) Bayer Leverkusen)
23	FW	SWE	Mayckel Lahdo (on loan to (France) Nantes)
24	DF	NED	Lewis Schouten (on loan to Excelsior)

=== Twente ===
In:

No.	Pos.	Nation	Player
3	DF	NED	Robin Pröpper (from (Scotland) Rangers)
6	MF	ALG	Ramiz Zerrouki (on loan from Feyenoord)
12	DF	POR	Guilherme Peixoto (from (Portugal) Benfica B)
14	MF	ISL	Kristian Hlynsson (from Ajax, previously on loan at Sparta Rotterdam)
20	MF	NED	Thomas van den Belt (from Feyenoord, previously on loan at (Spain) Castellón)
23	DF	ISR	Stav Lemkin (from (Ukraine) Shakhtar Donetsk, previously on loan at (Israel) Maccabi Tel Aviv)
27	FW	NOR	Sondre Ørjasæter (from (Norway) Sarpsborg 08)

Out:

No.	Pos.	Nation	Player
3	DF	SWE	Gustaf Lagerbielke (loan return to (Scotland) Celtic)
14	MF	NED	Sem Steijn (to Feyenoord)
18	MF	NED	Michel Vlap (to (Qatar) Al Ahli)
19	MF	MAR	Younes Taha (on loan to Groningen)
23	MF	CZE	Michal Sadílek (to (Czech Republic) Slavia Prague)
24	DF	MAR	Juliën Mesbahi (on loan to Emmen)
30	FW	TUN	Sayfallah Ltaief (on loan to Sparta Rotterdam)
41	MF	NED	Gijs Besselink (on loan to Willem II)
—	DF	ISL	Alfons Sampsted (to (England) Birmingham City, previously on loan)
—	MF	NED	Carel Eiting (to (Cyprus) Omonia, previously on loan at Sparta Rotterdam)
—	FW	NED	Mitchell van Bergen (to Sparta Rotterdam, previously on loan)

=== Go Ahead Eagles ===
In:

No.	Pos.	Nation	Player
18	FW	SUR	Richonell Margaret (from RKC Waalwijk)
21	MF	NED	Melle Meulensteen (from (Italy) Sampdoria)

Out:

No.	Pos.	Nation	Player
19	FW	FIN	Oliver Antman (to (Scotland) Rangers)
21	MF	NED	Enric Llansana (to (Belgium) Anderlecht)

=== NEC ===
In:

No.	Pos.	Nation	Player
1	GK	NED	Jasper Cillessen (from (Spain) Las Palmas)
7	FW	SUR	Virgil Misidjan (from (Hungary) Ferencváros)
9	MF	SUR	Tjaronn Chery (from (Belgium) Antwerp)
15	DF	NED	Jetro Willems (from (Spain) Castellón)
16	GK	ARG	Gonzalo Crettaz (from (Spain) Castellón)
34	FW	MAR	Youssef El Kachati (from Telstar)

Out:

No.	Pos.	Nation	Player
1	GK	NED	Stijn van Gassel (to Excelsior)
4	DF	ESP	Iván Márquez (loan return to (Germany) 1. FC Nürnberg)
6	MF	NED	Mees Hoedemakers (to (Denmark) Viborg)
11	FW	CUW	Sontje Hansen (to (England) Middlesbrough)
14	MF	NOR	Lars Olden Larsen (on loan to (Norway) Tromsø)
15	DF	NED	Thomas Reinders (to VVV-Venlo)
19	DF	GRE	Lefteris Lyratzis (loan return to (Greece) PAOK)
20	MF	DEN	Lasse Schöne (retired)
22	GK	NED	Robin Roefs (to (England) Sunderland)
27	MF	NED	Omar Mohamedhoesein (free agent)
29	MF	NED	Kas de Wit (to TOP Oss)

=== Heerenveen ===
In:

No.	Pos.	Nation	Player
3	DF	NED	Maas Willemsen (from De Graafschap)
6	MF	NED	Joris van Overeem (from (Israel) Maccabi Tel Aviv)
7	FW	FRA	Maxence Rivera (from (France) Dunkerque)
9	FW	SUR	Dylan Vente (from (Scotland) Hibernian, previously on loan at PEC Zwolle)
10	MF	NED	Ringo Meerveld (from Willem II)
15	DF	NED	Mats Egbring (from Vitesse)
17	DF	NOR	Nikolai Hopland (from (Norway) Aalesund, previously on loan)
19	DF	GRE	Vasilios Zagaritis (from Almere City)
26	FW	NED	Amourricho van Axel Dongen (on loan from Ajax)
27	FW	CZE	Václav Sejk (on loan from (Czech Republic) Sparta Prague, previously on loan at (Portugal) Famalicão)
31	GK	NED	Nordin Bakker (from Almere City)
—	MF	COD	Nolhan Courtens (from (Belgium) Young Reds Antwerp)

Out:

No.	Pos.	Nation	Player
2	DF	NED	Denzel Hall (to (England) Rotherham United)
3	DF	NED	Jordy de Wijs (loan return to (Germany) Fortuna Düsseldorf)
6	MF	GER	Amara Condé (to (Germany) SV Elversberg)
7	FW	NED	Ché Nunnely (free agent)
10	MF	MAR	Ilias Sebaoui (loan return to Feyenoord)
11	DF	GER	Mats Köhlert (to (Denmark) Brøndby)
13	GK	NED	Mickey van der Hart (to (South Africa) Cape Town City)
15	DF	IRQ	Hussein Ali (free agent)
18	FW	MDA	Ion Nicolaescu (to (Israel) Maccabi Tel Aviv)
23	GK	NED	Jan Bekkema (free agent)
24	FW	SRB	Miloš Luković (loan return to (France) Strasbourg)
26	FW	GRE	Dimitris Rallis (to (Poland) Jagiellonia Białystok)
27	DF	SRB	Mateja Milovanović (to (Serbia) Partizan)
30	MF	IRN	Alireza Jahanbakhsh (free agent)
—	FW	IRQ	Danilo Al-Saed (to (Sweden) Häcken, previously on loan at (Sweden) AIK)

=== PEC Zwolle ===
In:

No.	Pos.	Nation	Player
10	FW	NED	Koen Kostons (from (Germany) SC Paderborn, previously on loan at (Belgium) Kortrijk)
11	FW	BEL	Dylan Mbayo (from (Belgium) Kortrijk, previously on loan)
16	GK	NED	Tom de Graaff (on loan from Utrecht)
25	MF	NED	Thijs Oosting (on loan from Groningen)
28	DF	DEN	Simon Graves (from (Italy) Palermo, previously on loan)

Out:

No.	Pos.	Nation	Player
5	DF	BEL	Thierry Lutonda (to (Belgium) La Louvière)
6	MF	MAR	Anouar El Azzouzi (to (Germany) Fortuna Düsseldorf)
7	MF	DEN	Younes Namli (to (France) Le Havre)
9	FW	SUR	Dylan Vente (loan return to (Scotland) Hibernian)
10	MF	NED	Davy van den Berg (to Utrecht)
25	GK	NED	Kenneth Vermeer (to GVVV)
38	MF	NED	Teun Gijselhart (to De Graafschap)
40	GK	NED	Mike Hauptmeijer (to (Indonesia) Bali United)
—	MF	NED	Mohamed Oukhattou (to Jong Sparta, previously on loan)

=== Fortuna Sittard ===
In:

No.	Pos.	Nation	Player
18	MF	GRE	Dimitrios Limnios (on loan from (Greece) Panathinaikos)
19	FW	NED	Paul Gladon (free agent)
21	DF	SRB	Marko Kerkez (from (Serbia) Partizan, previously on loan at (Greece) Aris Thessaloniki)
23	MF	NED	Philip Brittijn (from De Graafschap)
28	DF	IDN	Justin Hubner (from (England) Wolverhampton Wanderers)
31	GK	NED	Mattijs Branderhorst (from Utrecht, previously on loan)
44	DF	ESP	Iván Márquez (from (Germany) 1. FC Nürnberg, previously on loan at NEC)
52	MF	NED	Mohamed Ihattaren (from RKC Waalwijk)
—	MF	SUR	Justin Lonwijk (on loan from (Ukraine) Dynamo Kyiv, previously on loan at (Denmark) Viborg)
—	DF	GNB	Houboulang Mendes (from (Spain) Almería, previously on loan at (France) Troyes)

Out:

No.	Pos.	Nation	Player
5	DF	AUT	Darijo Grujcic (to (Poland) Wisła Kraków)
14	DF	BRA	Rodrigo Guth (to (Argentina) Talleres)
17	FW	TUR	Onur Demir (on loan to (Slovakia) Petržalka)
19	FW	SRB	Bojan Radulović (loan return to (England) Huddersfield Town)
23	MF	CPV	Alessio da Cruz (to (Brazil) Athletic)
28	FW	CRO	Josip Mitrović (to (Croatia) Slaven Belupo)
32	MF	FRA	Loreintz Rosier (free agent)
33	MF	ARG	Ezequiel Bullaude (loan return to Feyenoord)
35	DF	NED	Mitchell Dijks (to (Vietnam) Nam Định)
—	DF	NED	Robyn Esajas (to (Portugal) Chaves, previously on loan at MVV)
—	DF	COM	Rémy Vita (to (Portugal) Tondela, previously on loan at (France) Amiens)
—	FW	ALG	Mouhamed Belkheir (to (Belgium) La Louvière, previously on loan)
—	FW	BEL	Milan Robberechts (to (Belgium) Patro Eisden, previously on loan at (Belgium) RSCA Futures)

=== Sparta Rotterdam ===
In:

No.	Pos.	Nation	Player
—	FW	ISL	Nökkvi Þeyr Þórisson (from (United States) St. Louis City, previously on loan)
—	MF	NED	Jens Toornstra (from Utrecht)
—	GK	POL	Filip Bednarek (from (Poland) Lech Poznań)
—	MF	NED	Lance Duijvestijn (from Excelsior)
—	GK	NED	Pascal Kuiper (from Excelsior)
—	DF	NED	Bruno Martins Indi (from AZ)
—	GK	NED	Joël Drommel (on loan from PSV)
—	FW	TUN	Sayfallah Ltaief (on loan from Twente)
—	DF	NED	Shurandy Sambo (on loan from (England) Burnley)
—	FW	NED	Mitchell van Bergen (from Twente, previously on loan)

Out:

No.	Pos.	Nation	Player
—	GK	NED	Nick Olij (to PSV)
—	GK	NED	Youri Schoonderwaldt (on loan to VVV-Venlo)
—	DF	NED	Mike Eerdhuijzen (to Utrecht)
—	DF	NED	Boyd Reith (on loan to Almere City)
—	DF	NED	Rick Meissen (to Excelsior)
—	MF	NED	Hamza el Dahri (to Almere City)
—	MF	NED	Carel Eiting (loan return to Twente)
—	MF	ISL	Kristian Hlynsson (loan return to Ajax)
—	MF	NED	Gjivai Zechiël (loan return to Feyenoord)
—	MF	MAR	Mohamed Nassoh (to NAC Breda)
—	FW	NED	Joel Ideho (on loan to Volendam)
—	DF	SUR	Djevencio van der Kust (to Heracles Almelo, previously on loan at (Belgium) Beerschot)

=== Groningen ===
In:

No.	Pos.	Nation	Player
4	DF	NED	Dies Janse (on loan from Jong Ajax)
10	MF	MAR	Younes Taha (on loan from Twente)
13	GK	SVN	Lovro Štubljar (from (Italy) Empoli, previously on loan at (Slovenia) Domžale)
15	DF	SWE	Elvis van der Laan (from (Sweden) AIK)
16	DF	CUW	Tyrique Mercera (from Cambuur)
19	FW	POL	Oskar Zawada (from RKC Waalwijk)

Out:

No.	Pos.	Nation	Player
4	DF	SWE	Hjalmar Ekdal (loan return to (England) Burnley)
7	DF	CUW	Leandro Bacuna (to (Turkey) Bandırmaspor)
10	MF	NED	Luciano Valente (to Feyenoord)
16	MF	NED	Dave Kwakman (loan return to AZ)
22	DF	NED	Finn Stam (loan return to AZ)
25	MF	NED	Thijs Oosting (on loan to PEC Zwolle)
29	FW	NED	Romano Postema (on loan to Emmen)
31	GK	NED	Jasper Meijster (to Cambuur)
36	DF	NED	Maxim Mariani (to TOP Oss)
99	FW	NED	Kevin van Veen (to FC Eindhoven)

=== Heracles Almelo ===
In:

No.	Pos.	Nation	Player
2	DF	NED	Mimeirhel Benita (from Feyenoord, previously on loan)
11	MF	FRA	Jeff Reine-Adélaïde (from (Italy) Salernitana)
15	DF	SUR	Djevencio van der Kust (from Sparta Rotterdam, previously on loan at (Belgium) Beerschot)
17	MF	NED	Tristan van Gilst (from De Graafschap)
21	MF	LUX	Yvandro Borges Sanches (from (Germany) Borussia Mönchengladbach)
23	DF	NED	Mike te Wierik (from Emmen)
33	GK	NED	Leco Zeevalkink (from NEO Borne)
70	MF	AUS	Ajdin Hrustic (from (Italy) Salernitana)

Out:

No.	Pos.	Nation	Player
5	MF	NED	Jordy Bruijn (to (Indonesia) Bali United)
11	FW	DEN	Nikolai Laursen (retired)
14	MF	BEL	Brian De Keersmaecker (to (England) Oxford United)
21	DF	NED	Justin Hoogma (to Willem II)
23	FW	FIN	Juho Talvitie (loan return to (Belgium) Lommel)
27	DF	SUR	Kelvin Leerdam (free agent)
29	FW	ISR	Suf Podgoreanu (loan return to (Israel) Maccabi Haifa)
35	DF	NED	Stijn Bultman (on loan to De Graafschap)
39	DF	NED	Mats Rots (loan return to Twente)

=== NAC Breda ===
In:

No.	Pos.	Nation	Player
7	FW	CAN	Charles-Andreas Brym (from Almere City)
9	FW	FRA	Moussa Soumano (from (France) Ajaccio)
10	MF	MAR	Mohamed Nassoh (from Sparta Rotterdam)
21	DF	NED	Jayden Candelaria (from Feyenoord U21)
22	DF	NED	Rio Hillen (from De Graafschap)
32	FW	FIN	Juho Talvitie (on loan from (Belgium) Lommel, previously on loan at Heracles Almelo)
55	FW	MAR	Brahim Ghalidi (from (Belgium) Standard Liège)
90	MF	GER	Lewis Holtby (from (Germany) Holstein Kiel)

Out:

No.	Pos.	Nation	Player
5	DF	BEL	Jan Van den Bergh (to (Japan) Júbilo Iwata)
7	MF	NZL	Matthew Garbett (to (England) Peterborough United)
9	FW	POL	Kacper Kostorz (loan return to (Poland) Pogoń Szczecin)
10	FW	ISL	Elías Már Ómarsson (to (China) Meizhou Hakka)
14	FW	PLE	Adam Kaied (to (Egypt) Zamalek)
17	FW	NED	Roy Kuijpers (to RKC Waalwijk)
19	FW	POR	Saná Fernandes (loan return to (Italy) Lazio)
37	GK	NED	Aron van Lare (free agent)
39	MF	CZE	Dominik Janošek (to (Czech Republic) Sigma Olomouc)
44	DF	BEL	Maxime Busi (loan return to (France) Reims)
77	FW	SVK	Leo Sauer (loan return to Feyenoord)
—	GK	NED	Tein Troost (to (Belgium) Lokeren, previously on loan at (Republic of Ireland) Cork City)

=== Volendam ===
In:

No.	Pos.	Nation	Player
5	DF	NED	Precious Ugwu (from Jong Ajax)
7	MF	AZE	Ozan Kökçü (free agent)
8	MF	NED	Gibson Yah (from Jong Utrecht)
14	DF	NED	Aaron Meijers (from RKC Waalwijk)
16	GK	NED	Roy Steur (from Jong PSV)
17	FW	NED	Joel Ideho (on loan from Sparta Rotterdam)
20	DF	NED	Nick Verschuren (on loan from Jong Ajax)
22	GK	NED	Dion Vlak (from RKAV Volendam)
99	FW	BEL	Anthony Descotte (on loan from (Belgium) Charleroi, previously on loan at Utrecht)

Out:

No.	Pos.	Nation	Player
2	DF	NED	Daniël Beukers (on loan to Emmen)
5	MF	CUW	Vurnon Anita (free agent)
7	FW	MAR	Bilal Ould-Chikh (to (Morocco) Raja Casablanca)
8	MF	NED	Jamie Jacobs (to Almere City)
14	DF	NED	Daan Steur (on loan to IJsselmeervogels)
16	GK	NED	Khadim Ngom (to Jong PSV)
22	GK	NED	Barry Lauwers (free agent)
23	DF	NED	Gladwin Curiel (to (Kosovo) Prishtina)
26	FW	CPV	Jerson Cabral (free agent)
34	MF	MAR	Imran Nazih (free agent)
—	MF	NED	Flip Klomp (to Koninklijke HFC, previously on loan at Spakenburg)
—	FW	BOE	Quincy Hoeve (to Jong Sparta, previously on loan)

=== Excelsior ===
In:

No.	Pos.	Nation	Player
1	GK	NED	Stijn van Gassel (from NEC)
3	DF	NED	Rick Meissen (from Sparta Rotterdam)
5	DF	NED	Stan Henderikx (from Den Bosch)
6	MF	SWE	Adam Carlén (from (Sweden) Göteborg)
7	MF	KOR	Yoon Do-young (on loan from (England) Brighton & Hove Albion)
8	MF	NED	Mathijs Tielemans (from Vitesse, previously on loan)
9	FW	POL	Szymon Włodarczyk (on loan from (Austria) Sturm Graz, previously on loan at (Italy) Salernitana)
11	FW	NED	Gyan de Regt (from Vitesse)
14	DF	NED	Lewis Schouten (on loan from AZ)
23	MF	GEO	Irakli Yegoian (from Vitesse)

Out:

No.	Pos.	Nation	Player
9	FW	SWE	Richie Omorowa (to (Turkey) Samsunspor)
10	MF	NED	Lance Duijvestijn (to Sparta Rotterdam)
21	FW	BEL	Jacky Donkor (to (Poland) Wieczysta Kraków)
23	MF	NED	Cedric Hatenboer (loan return to (Belgium) Anderlecht)
24	MF	NED	Joshua Eijgenraam (to VVV-Venlo)
38	GK	NED	Pascal Kuiper (to Sparta Rotterdam)
—	DF	NED	Seb Loeffen (to (Italy) Varesina, previously on loan at Spakenburg)
—	DF	NED	Serano Seymor (to (United Arab Emirates) Khor Fakkan, previously on loan at VVV-Venlo)
—	FW	SWE	Oscar Uddenäs (to (Sweden) Öster, previously on loan at (Sweden) AIK)

=== Telstar ===
In:

No.	Pos.	Nation	Player
5	DF	NED	Nigel Ogidi Nwankwo (from Quick Boys)
9	FW	NED	Milan Zonneveld (from Quick Boys)
14	DF	NED	Neville Ogidi Nwankwo (on loan from Utrecht)
16	MF	NED	Dylan Mertens (from (Russia) Fakel Voronezh)
20	GK	NED	Daan Reiziger (from Cambuur)
27	FW	NED	Patrick Brouwer (from Quick Boys)
29	MF	SUR	Dion Malone (from (Cyprus) Karmiotissa)
—	MF	NED	Jochem Ritmeester van de Kamp (on loan from Almere City)

Out:

No.	Pos.	Nation	Player
3	DF	NED	Mitch Apau (to Spakenburg)
8	MF	SUR	Jayden Turfkruier (free agent)
9	FW	MAR	Youssef El Kachati (to NEC)
12	MF	NED	Tom Overtoom (to Rijnsburgse Boys)
14	MF	NED	Mees Kaandorp (to (Egypt) Wadi Degla)
16	FW	NED	Achraf Douiri (to (Bahrain) Al-Najma)
20	DF	NED	Joey Houweling (free agent)
27	FW	NED	Reda Kharchouch (free agent)

== See also ==
- 2025–26 Eredivisie
