= 2025–26 Excelsior Rotterdam season =

Dutch football club season

Excelsior Rotterdam
2025–26 season
- Manager: Ruben den Uil
- Stadium: Stadion Woudestein
- Eredivisie: 13th
- KNVB Cup: First round
- Top goalscorer: League: Noah Naujoks (10 goals); All: Noah Naujoks (10 goals)
- Highest home attendance: 4,600 (14th, 16th, 18th, 23rd, 25th, 26th, 29th, 31st, 33rd weeks)
- Lowest home attendance: 3,608 4th week (FC Twente )
- Average home league attendance: 4,433
- Biggest win: 5–0 FC Utrecht (h) 31st week
- Biggest defeat: 5–0 NEC Nijmegen (a) 1st week
- All statistics correct as of 17 May 2026.

The 2025–26 season was Excelsior Rotterdam's 25th season in the Eredivisie, and first since promotion the previous season.

The team also took part in the KNVB Cup, but their run came to an end in the first round after a 1–0 loss to Excelsior Maassluis in extra time.

== Players ==
=== First-team squad ===
Source: Note: Flags indicate national team as defined under FIFA eligibility rules; some limited exceptions apply. Players may hold more than one non-FIFA nationality.

No.	Pos.	Nation	Player
1	GK	NED	Calvin Raatsie
2	DF	NED	Ilias Bronkhorst
3	DF	NED	Kik Pierie
4	DF	NED	Django Warmerdam
5	DF	SWE	Casper Widell
6	MF	BEL	Xander Blomme
7	FW	ITA	Seydou Fini
8	MF	NED	Mathijs Tielemans
9	FW	SWE	Richie Omorowa
10	MF	NED	Lance Duijvestijn
11	MF	USA	Zach Booth
12	DF	BFA	Arthur Zagre
14	FW	CUW	Rayvien Rosario
15	MF	NED	Noah Naujoks
16	DF	NED	Jurgen Mattheij
17	DF	BEL	Nolan Martens
19	FW	NED	Nesto Groen
20	MF	NED	Lennard Hartjes

No.	Pos.	Nation	Player
21	FW	BEL	Jacky Donkor
22	DF	NED	Jose De Almeida Reis
23	MF	NED	Cedric Hatenboer
24	MF	NED	Joshua Eijgenraam
26	DF	ARU	Kymani Nedd
28	MF	NED	Stjin Middendorp
29	FW	NED	Mike van Duinen
30	FW	NED	Sanches Fernandes
31	MF	NED	Guilliano Cairo
32	DF	NED	Siem De Moes
33	FW	NED	Jerolldino Armantrading
35	MF	NED	Liam Oetoehganal
38	GK	NED	Pascal Kuiper
40	GK	NED	Tijmen Holla
—	DF	SMA	Ronan Olivacce
—	MF	NED	Mika Luijendijk
—	MF	NED	Valentijn Zandbergen

== Transfers ==
=== In ===
Pos.	Player	Transferred from	Fee	Date
FW	(Sweden) Oscar Uddenäs	(Sweden) AIK Fotboll	End of loan	30 June 2025
DF	(Netherlands) Seb Loeffen	(Netherlands) SV Spakenburg	End of loan	30 June 2025
DF	(Netherlands) Serano Seymor	(Netherlands) VVV-Venlo	End of loan	30 June 2025
MF	(Sweden) Adam Carlén	(Sweden) IFK Göteborg		1 July 2025
FW	(Netherlands) Gyan de Regt	(Netherlands) SBV Vitesse	Free	1 July 2025
DF	(Netherlands) Lewis Schouten	(Netherlands) AZ Alkmaar	On loan	1 July 2025
MF	(Netherlands) Mathijs Tielemans	(Netherlands) SBV Vitesse		1 July 2025
GK	(Netherlands) Stijn van Gassel	(Netherlands) NEC Nijmegen		1 July 2025
MF	(Georgia (country)) Irakli Yegoian	(Netherlands) SBV Vitesse	Free	19 August 2025
DF	(Netherlands) Stan Henderikx	(Netherlands) FC Den Bosch	€500,000	9 July 2025
FW	(South Korea) Yoon Do-young	(England) Brighton & Hove Albion F.C.	On loan	16 July 2025
DF	(Netherlands) Rick Meissen	(Netherlands) Sparta Rotterdam		4 August 2025
FW	(Poland) Szymon Wlodarczyk	(Austria) SK Sturm Graz	On loan	22 August 2025

=== Out ===
Pos.	Player	Transferred to	Fee	Date
MF	(Netherlands) Cedric Hatenboer	(Belgium) R.S.C. Anderlecht	End of loan	30 June 2025
FW	(Italy) Seydou Fini	(Italy) Genoa CFC	End of loan	30 June 2025
MF	(Belgium) Xander Blomme	(Netherlands) Go Ahead Eagles	End of loan	30 June 2025
MF	(Netherlands) Joshua Eijgenraam	(Netherlands) VVV-Venlo	Free	1 July 2025
DF	(Netherlands) Jurgen Mattheij	No club		1 July 2025
MF	(Netherlands) Lance Duijvestijn	(Netherlands) Sparta Rotterdam	€600,000	1 July 2025
GK	(Netherlands) Pascal Kuiper	(Netherlands) Sparta Rotterdam		3 July 2025
FW	(Belgium) Jacky Donkor	(Poland) Wieczysta Kraków	Free	7 July 2025
FW	(Sweden) Oscar Uddenäs	(Sweden) Östers IF		8 July 2025
DF	(Netherlands) Seb Loeffen	(Italy) Varesina Sport CV SSD		19 July 2025
DF	(Netherlands) Serano Seymor	(United Arab Emirates) Khor Fakkan Club		21 July 2025
FW	(Sweden) Richie Omorowa	(Turkey) Samsunspor		24 July 2025
DF	(Netherlands) Siem de Moes	(Netherlands) FC Eindhoven	Free	28 August 2025
DF	(Netherlands) Django Warmerdam	(Denmark) Lyngby Boldklub	Free	29 August 2025
DF	(Netherlands) Kik Pierie	End of career		3 September 2025
FW	(Netherlands) Valentijn Zandbergen	(Netherlands) VV Katwijk	Free	3 September 2025
FW	(Curaçao) Rayvien Rosario	(Greece) PAS Giannina F.C.	Free	12 September 2025
MF	(Netherlands) Stijn Middendorp	(Cyprus) Anorthosis Famagusta FC	Free	31 January 2026

== Competitions ==
=== Overall record ===
Competition	First match	Last match	Starting round	Final position	Record							
Competition	First match	Last match	Starting round	Final position	Pld	W	D	L	GF	GA	GD	Win %
Eredivisie	9 August 2025	17 May 2026	Week 1	13th	34	10	8	16	43	56	−13	29.41
KNVB Cup	29 October 2025	29 October 2025	1st round	1st round	1	0	0	1	0	1	−1	0.00
Total					35	10	8	17	43	57	−14	28.57

Source: ESPN

=== Eredivisie ===
==== League table ====
Pos	Team	Pld	W	D	L	GF	GA	GD	Pts
11	Fortuna Sittard	34	11	6	17	49	63	−14	39
12	Go Ahead Eagles	34	8	14	12	54	53	+1	38
13	Excelsior	34	10	8	16	43	56	−13	38
14	Telstar	34	9	10	15	49	55	−6	37
15	PEC Zwolle	34	9	10	15	44	71	−27	37

Source: Eredivisie
Rules for classification: At end of season: 1) Points; 2) Goal difference; 3) Goals scored; 4) Head-to-head points; 5) Head-to-head goal difference; 6) Head-to-head goals scored; 7) Head-to-head away goals scored; 8) Play-off match or matches; 9) Penalty shoot-out (if the play-off match or matches end in a draw)

==== Results summary ====
Overall								Home						Away					
Pld	W	D	L	GF	GA	GD	Pts	W	D	L	GF	GA	GD	W	D	L	GF	GA	GD
34	10	8	16	43	56	−13	38	5	3	9	20	22	−2	5	5	7	23	34	−11

Last updated: 21 May 2026.
Source: Eredivisie

==== Results by round ====
Round	1	2	3	4	5	6	7	8	9	10	11	12	13	14	15	16	17	18	19	20	21	22	23	24	25	26	27	28	29	30	31	32	33	34
Ground	A	H	A	H	H	A	H	A	H	A	A	H	A	H	H	H	A	H	A	A	H	A	H	A	H	H	A	A	H	A	H	A	H	A
Result	L	L	L	W	L	W	L	L	W	L	D	L	W	W	L	W	L	D	D	D	D	W	L	L	L	L	L	D	L	D	W	W	D	W
Position	18	17	17	16	16	17	17	17	13	16		16					14	14		13	13				15		15	16		15	14	14	14	13

Source: ESPN
A = Away; H = Home; W = Win; D = Draw; L = Loss

=== Matches ===
==== 1st half ====
9 August 2025 1st week	NEC Nijmegen	5–0	Excelsior Rotterdam	Nijmegen
16:30	Dirk Proper 14'; Koki Ogawa 52' 59'; Bryan Linssen 67'; Tjaronn Chery 82' (pen.)	Report		Stadium: Goffertstadion; Attendance: 12,650; Referee: Danny Makkelie

16 August 2025 2nd week	Excelsior Rotterdam	1–2	Feyenoord	Rotterdam
18:45	Sanches Fernandes 9'	Report	Ayase Ueda 22'; Sem Steijn 34'	Stadium: Stadion Woudestein; Attendance: 3,845; Referee: Dennis Higler

24 August 2025 3rd week	FC Utrecht	4–1	Excelsior Rotterdam	Utrecht
14:30	Miguel Rodríguez 27'; David Min 45+1'; Victor Jensen 58' 67'	Report	Yoon Do-young 83'	Stadium: Stadion Galgenwaard; Attendance: 21,547; Referee: Joey Kooij

30 August 2025 4th week	Excelsior Rotterdam	1–0	FC Twente	Rotterdam
21:00	Mike van Duinen 83'	Report		Stadium: Stadion Woudestein; Attendance: 3,608; Referee: Ingmar Oostrom

14 September 2025 5th week	Excelsior Rotterdam	0–1	Sparta Rotterdam	Rotterdam
12:15		Report	Ayoub Oufkir 90+3'	Stadium: Stadion Woudestein; Attendance: 4,400; Referee: Jeroen Manschot

20 September 2025 6th week	FC Volendam	1–2	Excelsior Rotterdam	Volendam
16:30	Robin van Cruijsen 45'	Report	Szymon Wlodarczyk 10'; Lewis Schouten 90+4'	Stadium: Kras Stadion; Attendance: 6,471; Referee: Marc Nagtegaal

28 September 2025 7th week	Excelsior Rotterdam	1–2	PSV Eindhoven	Rotterdam
20:00	Szymon Wlodarczyk 13'	Report	Joey Veerman 19'; Ismael Saibari 72'	Stadium: Stadion Woudestein; Attendance: 4,400; Referee: Dennis Higler

4 October 2025 8th week	SC Heerenveen	2–1	Excelsior Rotterdam	Heerenveen
21:00	Dylan Vente 89' (pen.); Sam Kersten 90+4'	Report	Irakli Yegoian 11'	Stadium: Abe Lenstra Stadion; Attendance: 22,298; Referee: Richard Martens

19 October 2025 9th week	Excelsior Rotterdam	1–0	Fortuna Sittard	Rotterdam
14:30	Gyan de Regt 9'	Report		Stadium: Stadion Woudestein; Attendance: 4,400; Referee: Alex Bos

26 October 2025 10th week	Go Ahead Eagles	2–0	Excelsior Rotterdam	Deventer
20:00	Mathis Suray 58' 66'	Report		Stadium: De Adelaarshorst; Attendance: 9,900; Referee: Jannick van der Laan

1 November 2025 11th week	SC Telstar	2–2	Excelsior Rotterdam	Velsen-Zuid
21:00	Jochem Ritmeester van de Kamp 2'; Tyrone Owusu 28'	Report	Arthur Zagré 44' (pen.); Gyan de Regt 77'	Stadium: BUKO Stadion; Attendance: 5,270; Referee: Jannick van der Laan

8 November 2025 12th week	Excelsior Rotterdam	1–2	Heracles Almelo	Rotterdam
16:30	Noah Naujoks 8'	Report	Walid Ould-Chikh 60'; Luka Kulenovic 79'	Stadium: Stadion Woudestein; Attendance: 4,400

22 November 2025 13th week	AFC Ajax	1–2	Excelsior Rotterdam	Amsterdam
18:45	Kasper Dolberg 59'	Report	Noah Naujoks 37' 46'	Stadium: Johan Cruijff Arena; Attendance: 54,484; Referee: Joey Kooij

29 November 2025 14th week	Excelsior Rotterdam	1–0	Heracles Almelo	Rotterdam
16:30	Noah Naujoks 23' (pen.)	Report		Stadium: Stadion Woudestein; Attendance: 4,600; Referee: Serdar Gözübüyük

5 December 2025 15th week	Excelsior Rotterdam	0–2	FC Groningen	Rotterdam
20:00		Report	Thom van Bergen 61'; Stije Resink 90+2' (pen.)	Stadium: Stadion Woudestein; Attendance: 4,400; Referee: Martijn Vos

20 December 2025 16th week	Excelsior Rotterdam	2–1	PEC Zwolle	Rotterdam
18:45	Noah Naujoks 20'; Irakli Yegoian 78'	Report	Ryan Thomas 48'	Stadium: Stadion Woudestein; Attendance: 4,600; Referee: Sander van der Eijk

==== 2nd half ====
10 January 2026 17th week	PSV Eindhoven	5–1	Excelsior Rotterdam	Eindhoven
20:00	Paul Wanner 8'; Ricardo Pepi 23'; Yarek Gasiorowski 33'; Ryan Flamingo 39'; Dennis Man 69'	Report	Ilias Bronkhorst 45+1'	Stadium: Philips Stadion; Attendance: 32,000; Referee: Joey Kooij

17 January 2026 18th week	Excelsior Rotterdam	2–2	SC Telstar	Rotterdam
20:00	Irakli Yegoian 75'; Noah Naujoks 81'	Report	Jochem Ritmeester van de Kamp 52'; Nils Rossen 57'	Stadium: Stadion Woudestein; Attendance: 4,600; Referee: Bas Nijhuis

21 January 2026 19th week	AZ Alkmaar	1–1	Excelsior Rotterdam	Alkmaar
18:45	Troy Parrott 65'	Report	Miliano Jonathans 81'	Stadium: AFAS Stadion; Attendance: 16,997; Referee: Alex Bos

24 January 2026 20th week	FC Twente	0–0	Excelsior Rotterdam	Enschede
21:00		Report		Stadium: De Grolsch Veste; Attendance: 29,000; Referee: Allard Lindhout

1 February 2026 21st week	Excelsior Rotterdam	2–2	AFC Ajax	Rotterdam
12:15	Miliano Jonathans 74'; Arthur Zagre 79'	Report	Mika Godts 21' 40'	Stadium: Stadion Woudestein; Attendance: 4,500; Referee: Marc Nagtegaal

6 February 2026 22nd week	NAC Breda	0–2	Excelsior Rotterdam	Breda
20:00		Report	Emil Hansson 18'; Irakli Yegoian 31'	Stadium: Rat Verlegh Stadion; Attendance: 19,922; Referee: Serdar Gözübüyük

14 February 2026 23rd week	Excelsior Rotterdam	1–2	AZ Alkmaar	Rotterdam
18:45	Ilias Bronkhorst 45+1'	Report	Troy Parrott 90+2'; Alexandre Penetra 90+6'	Stadium: Stadion Woudestein; Attendance: 4,600; Referee: Erwin Blank

20 February 2026 24th week	Fortuna Sittard	2–1	Excelsior Rotterdam	Sittard
20:00	Mohamed Ihattaren 45+5' (pen.); Kaj Sierhuis 58'	Report	Noah Naujoks 78'	Stadium: Fortuna Sittard Stadion; Attendance: 9,677; Referee: Martin van den Kerkhof

1 March 2026 25th week	Excelsior Rotterdam	0–1	Go Ahead Eagles	Rotterdam
20:00		Report	Søren Tengstedt 54'	Stadium: Stadion Woudestein; Attendance: 4,600

7 March 2026 26th week	Excelsior Rotterdam	1–2	SC Heerenveen	Rotterdam
21:00	Noah Naujoks 74' (pen.)	Report	Luuk Brouwers 38'; Joris van Overeem 67'	Stadium: Stadion Woudestein; Attendance: 4,600; Referee: Danny Makkelie

15 March 2026 27th week	Feyenoord	2–1	Excelsior Rotterdam	Rotterdam
14:30	Ayase Ueda 58' 59'	Report	Arthur Zagre 28'	Stadium: De Kuip; Attendance: 47,500; Referee: Serdar Gözübüyük

20 March 2026 28th week	Heracles Almelo	1–1	Excelsior Rotterdam	Almelo
20:00	Sem Scheperman 23'	Report	Sanches Fernandes 57'	Stadium: Asito Stadion; Attendance: 11,735; Referee: Joey Kooij

4 April 2026 29th week	Excelsior Rotterdam	0–2	NEC Nijmegen	Rotterdam
21:00		Report	Bryan Linssen 30'; Başar Önal 71'	Stadium: Stadion Woudestein; Attendance: 4,600; Referee: Alex Bos

12 April 2026 30th week	PEC Zwolle	2–2	Excelsior Rotterdam	Zwolle
14:30	Thijs Oosting 3'; Odysseus Velanas 60'	Report	Sanches Fernandes 16'; Szymon Wlodarczyk 80'	Stadium: MAC3PARK Stadion; Attendance: 13,747; Referee: Rob Dieperink

26 April 2026 31st week	Excelsior Rotterdam	5–0	FC Utrecht	Rotterdam
12:15	Noah Naujoks 11'; Sanches Fernandes 36' 55'; Irakli Yegoian 69'; Lennard Hartjes 90+3'	Report		Stadium: Stadion Woudestein; Attendance: 4,600

2 May 2026 32nd week	FC Groningen	2–3	Excelsior Rotterdam	Groningen
18:45	Tika de Jonge 3'; Younes Taha 47'	Report	Casper Widell 40'; Sanches Fernandes 65'; Gyan de Regt 90'	Stadium: Euroborg; Attendance: 22,525; Referee: Ingmar Oostrom

10 May 2026 33rd week	Excelsior Rotterdam	1–1	FC Volendam	Rotterdam
18:45	Gibson Yah 38' (o.g.)	Report	Benjamin Pauwels 2'	Stadium: Stadion Woudestein; Attendance: 4,600

17 May 2026 34th week	Sparta Rotterdam	2–3	Excelsior Rotterdam	Rotterdam
14:30	Ayoni Santos 53'; Milan Zonneveld 90+1'	Report	Giannino Vianello 14' (o.g.); Arthur Zagre 50'; Noah Naujoks 62'	Stadium: Het Kasteel; Attendance: 10,599

=== KNVB Cup ===
29 October 2025 1st round	Excelsior Maassluis	1–0 (a.e.t.)	Excelsior Rotterdam	Maassluis
21:00	Nick Nagtegaal 120+1'	Report		Stadium: Sportpark Dijkpolder; Referee: Martijn Vos

== Statistics ==
=== Scorers ===
#	Player	Eredivisie
1	(Netherlands) Noah Naujoks	10
2	(Netherlands) Sanches Fernandes	6
3	(Georgia (country)) Irakli Yegoian	5
4	(France) Arthur Zagré	4
5	(Netherlands) Gyan de Regt	3
5	(Poland) Szymon Włodarczyk	3
7	(Netherlands) Ilias Bronkhorst	2
7	(Indonesia) Miliano Jonathans	2
9	(Sweden) Casper Widell	1
9	(Sweden) Emil Hansson	1
9	(Netherlands) Lennard Hartjes	1
9	(Netherlands) Lewis Schouten	1
9	(Netherlands) Mike van Duinen	1
9	(South Korea) Yoon Do-young	1

=== Assists ===
#	Player	Eredivisie
1	(Netherlands) Gyan de Regt	7
2	(Netherlands) Sanches Fernandes	4
3	(Netherlands) Rick Meijssen	3
4	(Sweden) Arthur Zagre	2
4	(Georgia (country)) Irakli Yegoian	2
4	(Netherlands) Mike van Duinen	2
4	(Netherlands) Noah Naujoks	2
8	(Sweden) Adam Carlén	1
8	(Sweden) Casper Widell	1
8	(Sweden) Emil Hansson	1
8	(Netherlands) Ilias Bronkhorst	1
8	(Belgium) Nolan Martens	1
8	(Netherlands) Stijn van Gassel	1
8	(Poland) Szymon Włodarczyk	1

=== Appearances ===
#	Player	Eredivisie	KNVB	Total
1	(Sweden) Casper Widell	34	1	35
1	(Netherlands) Gyan de Regt	34	1	35
3	(Netherlands) Ilias Bronkhorst	33	1	34
3	(Netherlands) Sanches Fernandes	33	1	34
5	(Netherlands) Rick Meijssen	33	0	33
5	(Netherlands) Stijn van Gassel	32	1	33
7	(Georgia (country)) Irakli Yegoian	31	1	32
8	(France) Arthur Zagre	30	1	31
8	(Netherlands) Noah Naujoks	31	0	31
10	(Netherlands) Mike van Duinen	28	1	29
11	(Sweden) Adam Carlén	25	1	26
12	(Netherlands) Jerolldino Bergraaf	24	1	25
12	(Netherlands) Lewis Schouten	24	1	25
14	(Poland) Szymon Włodarczyk	23	0	23
15	(Netherlands) Lennard Hartjes	21	0	21
16	(Netherlands) Simon Janssen	13	0	13
17	(Sweden) Emil Hansson	12	0	12
18	(Netherlands) Stan Hendrikx	10	1	11
19	(Belgium) Nolan Martens	9	1	10
19	(Serbia) Stefan Mitrović	9	1	10
21	(Indonesia) Miliano Jonathans	9	0	9
22	(Ivory Coast) Chris-Kévin Nadje	7	0	7
22	(South Korea) Yoon Do-young	6	1	7
24	(Netherlands) Stjin Middendorp	6	0	6
25	(Netherlands) Calvin Raatsie	2	1	3
25	(Netherlands) Mathijs Tielemans	2	1	3
25	(United States) Zach Booth	3	0	3
28	(Netherlands) Guilliano Cairo	1	0	1
28	(Netherlands) Nesto Groen	1	0	1
28	(Netherlands) Noa El Hamdaoui	1	0	1
28	(Netherlands) Tijmen Holla	1	0	1

=== Clean sheets ===
#	Player	Eredivisie
1	(Netherlands) Stijn van Gassel	6

=== Disciplinary record ===
#	Player	Eredivisie		KNVB		Total	
#	Player	Yellow card	Red card	Yellow card	Red card	Yellow card	Red card
1	(France) Arthur Zagre	5	1	0	0	5	1
2	(Netherlands) Stan Hendrikx	0	1	0	0	0	1
2	(Netherlands) Stjin Middendorp	0	1	0	0	0	1
4	(Netherlands) Ilias Bronkhorst	6	0	0	0	6	0
5	(France) Adam Carlén	4	0	0	0	4	0
5	(Netherlands) Rick Meijssen	4	0	0	0	4	0
7	(Netherlands) Gyan de Regt	3	0	0	0	3	0
7	(Netherlands) Noah Naujoks	3	0	0	0	3	0
9	(Sweden) Casper Widell	2	0	0	0	2	0
9	(France) Chris-Kevin Nadje	2	0	0	0	2	0
9	(Georgia (country)) Irakli Yegoian	1	0	0	0	2	0
9	(Netherlands) Mike van Duinen	2	0	0	0	2	0
13	(Netherlands) Calvin Raatsie	0	0	1	0	1	0
13	(Sweden) Emil Hansson	1	0	0	0	1	0
13	(Netherlands) Jerolldino Bergraaf	1	0	0	0	1	0
13	(Netherlands) Lennard Hartjes	1	0	0	0	1	0
13	(Netherlands) Lewis Schouten	1	0	0	0	1	0
13	(Indonesia) Miliano Jonathans	1	0	0	0	1	0
13	(Poland) Szymon Włodarczyk	1	0	0	0	1	0
13	(South Korea) Yoon Do-Yong	1	0	0	0	1	0
