= Gylermo Siereveld =

Dutch footballer (born 2003)

Personal information
- Full name: Gylermo Misaine Siereveld
- Date of birth: 13 March 2003 (age 23)
- Place of birth: Vlissingen, Netherlands
- Height: 1.87 m (6 ft 2 in)
- Position: Centre-back

Team information
- Current team: HSV Hoek
- Number: 24

Youth career
- –2018: JVOZ
- 2018–2020: NAC Breda

Senior career*
Years	Team	Apps	(Gls)
2020–2022	NAC Breda	5	(0)
2022–2024	ADO Den Haag	24	(0)
2024–2025	Terrassa	31	(1)
2025	Borac Banja Luka	0	(0)
2026–	HSV Hoek	26	(0)
- * Club domestic league appearances and goals as of 13:36, 19 November 2026 (UTC)

Gylermo Misaine Siereveld (born 13 March 2002) is a Dutch professional footballer who plays as a centre-back for club HSV Hoek.

== Career ==
=== NAC Breda ===
Siereveld signed a two and-a-half year contract with NAC Breda on 30 November 2019. He had moved across amateur club JVOZ in his native Vlissingen the season before. He made his debut for NAC Breda in the Eerste Divisie on 20 October 2020, in a 0–4 lost home game against SC Cambuur.

=== ADO Den Haag ===
NAC Breda only offered him a one-year contract extension, and in June 2022 at the age of 20 years-old, he signed for ADO Den Haag on a two-year contract with options for two further seasons. Technical Director Daryl Janmaat said expectations were he would go straight into Dirk Kuyt’s first team squad. He made his debut for the club as a starter on 12 September 2022, in a 1-1 away draw in the Eerste Divisie against Jong Utrecht.

=== Terrassa ===
On 21 May 2024, Spanish Segunda Federación club Terrassa announced the signing of Siereveld from the 2024–25 season. He made his debut in the Segunda Federación – Group 3 in a 1-1 home draw against Elche II on 1 September 2024. He scored his first league goal for the club with the second in a 2-0 away win over UD Alzira on 21 December 2024.

=== Borac Banja Luka ===
On 17 June 2025, Siereveld signed with Borac Banja Luka in Bosnia and Herzegovina.

== Style of play ==
Siereveld was described by his manager at ADO Deb Haag, and a Dutch international with over 100 caps for the Netherlands national team, Dirk Kuyt, as having "the potential to become a very good central defender. He is strong, fast and has the right height", Kuyt added that the game so easily to him his biggest problem appeared to be focusing 100% on the game at all times.

== Personal life ==
He is from Vlissingen, Walcheren in the province of Zeeland, Netherlands.

== Career statistics ==
As of match played 25 May 2024

Appearances and goals by club, season and competition
Club	Season	League			KNVB Beker		Europe		Other		Total	
Club	Season	Division	Apps	Goals	Apps	Goals	Apps	Goals	Apps	Goals	Apps	Goals
NAC Breda	2020–21	Eerste Divisie	2	0	1	0	—		—		3	0
NAC Breda	2021–22	Eerste Divisie	3	0	0	0	—		—		3	0
NAC Breda	Total		5	0	1	0	0	0	0	0	6	0
ADO Den Haag	2022–23	Eerste Divisie	7	0	0	0	—		—		7	0
ADO Den Haag	2023–24	Eerste Divisie	17	0	3	0	—		4 (Note: Appearances in Eredivisie promotion/relegation play-offs)	0	24	0
ADO Den Haag	Total		24	0	3	0	—		4	0	31	0
Career total			29	0	4	0	0	0	4	0	37	0
