= Stijn Middendorp =

Dutch footballer (born 2004)

Personal information
- Full name: Stijn Robbe Middendorp
- Date of birth: 12 February 2004 (age 22)
- Place of birth: Rotterdam, Netherlands
- Height: 1.89 m (6 ft 2 in)
- Position: Midfielder

Team information
- Current team: Anorthosis Famagusta
- Number: 36

Youth career
- –2024: Excelsior

Senior career*
Years	Team	Apps	(Gls)
2024–2026	Excelsior	8	(0)
2026–	Anorthosis Famagusta	12	(0)
- * Club domestic league appearances and goals as of 14 June 2026

Stijn Robbe Middendorp (born 12 February 2004) is a Dutch professional footballer who plays as a midfielder for Cypriot club Anorthosis Famagusta.

== Club career ==
=== Excelsior ===
Middendorp played in the youth academy of Excelsior Rotterdam and made his debut in the first team at the start of the 2024/25 season. On 16 August 2024, Excelsior won 3–1 against De Graafschap in the Eerste Divisie. Coach Ruben den Uil brought Middendorp on as a substitute for Cedric Hatenboer in injury time in the second half. Later that season, he played twice more for Excelsior, which was promoted to the Eredivisie as runner-up. In preparation for the 2025/26 season, Middendorp was invited to join the first team. On 5 December 2025, he was allowed to start in the starting lineup against FC Groningen. After a goal by Thom van Bergen, Middendorp received a direct red card from referee Martijn Vos. FC Groningen ultimately won 0–2.

=== Anorthosis Famagusta ===
On 31 January 2026, Middendorp joined Cypriot First Division club Anorthosis Famagusta on a free transfer from Excelsior Rotterdam. He signed an amateur contract with the club until 31 May 2027.
