= Derensili Sanches Fernandes =

Cape Verdean footballer (born 2001)

Personal information
- Full name: Derensili Sanches Fernandes
- Date of birth: 28 May 2001 (age 25)
- Place of birth: Rotterdam, Netherlands
- Height: 1.78 m (5 ft 10 in)
- Position: Right winger

Team information
- Current team: Huddersfield Town
- Number: 30

Youth career
- –2020: Excelsior
- 2020–2023: Utrecht

Senior career*
Years	Team	Apps	(Gls)
2020	Excelsior	0	(0)
2020–2023	Jong Utrecht	83	(12)
2023	Utrecht	3	(0)
2023–2026	Excelsior	97	(19)
2026–	Huddersfield Town	14	(7)

International career^{‡}
2026–	Cape Verde	1	(1)
- * Club domestic league appearances and goals as of 22:03, 3 November 2026 (UTC) ‡ National team caps and goals as of 18:07, 13 November 2026 (UTC)

Derensili Sanches Fernandes (born 28 May 2001) is a professional footballer who plays as a right winger for EFL League One club Huddersfield Town. Born in the Netherlands, he plays for the Cape Verde national team.

== Club career ==
=== Early career ===
Fernandes started playing for Neptunus before joining up with the Excelsior youth academy. He was moved to Excelsior's senior squad early in the 2020–21 season, but remained on the bench and did not make his professional debut.

In October 2020, he moved to Utrecht from Excelsior, signing a two-year deal with an option to extend it to the summer of 2023.

Fernandes made his debut for Utrecht in the Eredivisie in a 5–5 draw against AZ on 28 January 2023.

On 15 July 2023, Fernandes returned to Excelsior on a three-year deal.

=== Huddersfield Town ===
On 21 July 2026, Fernandes joined League One club Huddersfield Town on a four-year contract for an undisclosed fee. He made his debut for the club on 8 August 2026, in a 1–1 draw with Preston North End which Huddersfield lost on penalties in the EFL Cup. On 15 August 2026, he scored his first goals for the club, netting twice in a 3–0 win over AFC Wimbledon.

== International career ==
Born in the Netherlands, Sanches Fernandes is of Cape Verdean descent.

On 13 November 2026, Sanches Fernandes made his debut for Cape Verde, coming on as a substitute in a 4–2 AFCON qualifier win over Liberia. He scored the fourth goal of the match.

== Career statistics ==
=== Club ===
As of match played 3 November 2026

Appearances and goals by club, season and competition
Club	Season	League			National Cup (Note: Includes KNVB Cup, FA Cup)		League Cup (Note: Includes EFL Cup)		Other		Total	
Club	Season	Division	Apps	Goals	Apps	Goals	Apps	Goals	Apps	Goals	Apps	Goals
Utrecht	2022–23	Eredivisie	3	0	0	0	—		—		3	0
Excelsior	2023–24	Eredivisie	30	2	2	0	—		1 (Note: Appearances in Eredivisie promotion play-offs)	0	32	2
Excelsior	2024–25	Eerste Divisie	34	11	3	0	—		—		37	11
Excelsior	2025–26	Eredivisie	33	6	1	0	—		—		34	6
Excelsior	Total		97	19	6	0	0	0	1	0	104	19
Huddersfield Town	2026–27	League One	14	7	0	0	1	0	0	0	15	7
Career total			114	26	6	0	1	0	1	0	122	26

=== International ===
As of match played 13 November 2026

Appearances and goals by national team and year
National team	Year	Apps	Goals
Cape Verde	2026	1	1
Total		1	1

Scores and results list Cape Verde's goal tally first, score column indicates score after each Sanches Fernandes goal.

List of international goals scored by Derensili Sanches Fernandes
No.	Date	Venue	Cap	Opponent	Score	Result	Competition	Ref.
1	13 November 2026	Estádio Nacional de Cabo Verde, Praia, Cape Verde	1	Liberia	4–1	4–2	2027 Africa Cup of Nations qualification	
