= Kilian Nikiema =

Burkinabé footballer

Personal information
- Full name: Killian Basba Geeke Nikiema
- Date of birth: 22 June 2003 (age 23)
- Place of birth: Drachten, Netherlands
- Height: 1.87 m (6 ft 2 in)
- Position: Goalkeeper

Team information
- Current team: ADO Den Haag
- Number: 1

Youth career
- 2007–2016: Voorschoten '97
- 2016–2019: ADO Den Haag

Senior career*
Years	Team	Apps	(Gls)
2019–	ADO Den Haag	91	(0)

International career^{‡}
2017–2018	Netherlands U15	3	(0)
2018	Netherlands U16	1	(0)
2019	Netherlands U17	1	(0)
2019–	Burkina Faso	12	(0)
- * Club domestic league appearances and goals as of 24 October 2026 ‡ National team caps and goals as of 22:24, 17 September 2026 (UTC)

Killian Basba Geeke Nikiema (born 22 June 2003) is a professional footballer who plays as goalkeeper for Eredivisie club ADO Den Haag. Born in the Netherlands, he plays for the Burkina Faso national team.

== Club career ==
Nikiema began playing football with the youth academy of Voorschoten '97 at the age of 4 and played as winger, before switching to become a goalkeeper at 15. He joined the youth academy of ADO Den Haag in 2016, and signed his first professional contract with them on 9 May 2019.

== International career ==
Nikema was born in the Netherlands to a Burkinabé father and Dutch mother, and is a youth international for the Netherlands. Nikiema made his professional debut for the Burkina Faso national team in a friendly 1–0 win over Libya on 4 September 2019.

== Career statistics ==
=== Club ===
As of match played 24 October 2026

Appearances and goals by club, season and competition
Club	Season	League			Cup		Europe		Other		Total	
Club	Season	Division	Apps	Goals	Apps	Goals	Apps	Goals	Apps	Goals	Apps	Goals
ADO Den Haag	2021–22	Eerste Divisie	0	0	0	0	—		—		0	0
ADO Den Haag	2022–23	Eerste Divisie	1	0	—		—		—		1	0
ADO Den Haag	2023–24	Eerste Divisie	12	0	—		—		0	0	12	0
ADO Den Haag	2024–25	Eerste Divisie	32	0	—		—		2 (Note: Appearances in Promotion play-offs)	0	34	0
ADO Den Haag	2025–26	Eerste Divisie	36	0	0	0	—		—		36	0
ADO Den Haag	2026–27	Eredivisie	10	0	0	0	—		—		10	0
Career total			91	0	0	0	0	0	2	0	93	0

=== International ===
As of match played 17 September 2026

Appearances and goals by national team and year
National team	Year	Apps	Goals
Burkina Faso	2019	1	0
Burkina Faso	2022	1	0
Burkina Faso	2023	2	0
Burkina Faso	2024	3	0
Burkina Faso	2025	2	0
Burkina Faso	2026	1	0
Total		10	0

== Honours ==
ADO Den Haag

- Eerste Divisie: 2025–26
