= Silvinho Esajas =

Surinamese footballer

Personal information
- Full name: Silvinho Randy Esajas
- Date of birth: 8 July 2002 (age 24)
- Place of birth: Boxtel, Netherlands
- Height: 1.93 m (6 ft 4 in)
- Position: Defender

Youth career
- 2009–2019: Zeeburgia
- 2019–2020: Hellas Verona
- 2020–2021: ADO Den Haag

Senior career*
Years	Team	Apps	(Gls)
2021–2025	ADO Den Haag	52	(4)
2025–2026	Volendam	15	(1)

International career^{‡}
2025–	Suriname	1	(0)
- * Club domestic league appearances and goals as of 28 August 2026 ‡ National team caps and goals as of 26 March 2025

Silvinho Randy Esajas (born 10 September 2002) is a professional footballer who plays as a defender. Born in the Netherlands, he represents the Suriname national team.

== Club career ==
Esajas joined the Zeeburgia youth academy in 2009 at the age of 7, before moving to Hellas Verona in 2019. On 1 September 2020, Esajas signed a professional contract with ADO Den Haag. Esajas made his debut with ADO Den Haag in a 4–1 Eredivisie loss to FC Utrecht on 4 April 2021.

On 20 January 2025, Esajas left ADO Den Haag by mutual consent.

Three days later, Esajas joined Volendam on an amateur basis, with an option of a further three-year contract beginning in the 2025–26 season. On 31 August 2026, his contract with Volendam was mutually terminated.

== Career statistics ==
As of match played 25 May 2024

Appearances and goals by club, season and competition
Club	Season	League			Cup		Europe		Other		Total	
Club	Season	Division	Apps	Goals	Apps	Goals	Apps	Goals	Apps	Goals	Apps	Goals
ADO Den Haag	2020–21	Eredivisie	2	0	0	0	—		—		2	0
ADO Den Haag	2021–22	Eerste Divisie	1	0	0	0	—		1 (Note: Appearances in Eredivisie promotion/relegation play-offs)	0	2	0
ADO Den Haag	2022–23	Eerste Divisie	24	2	2	0	—		—		26	2
ADO Den Haag	2023–24	Eerste Divisie	17	2	2	0	—		4	0	23	2
career total			44	4	4	0	0	0	5	0	53	4
