= 2022–23 ADO Den Haag season =

ADO Den Haag
2022–23 season
- Owner: David Blitzer
- Chairman: Harm de Boer
- Head coach: Dirk Kuyt (until 24 November); Dick Advocaat (from 28 November)
- Stadium: Cars Jeans Stadion
- Eerste Divisie: 13th
- KNVB Cup: Quarter-finals
- Top goalscorer: League: Thomas Verheydt (7); All: Thomas Verheydt (8)
- All statistics correct as of 9 February 2023.

The 2022–23 season is the 118th season in the history of ADO Den Haag and their second consecutive season in the second division of Dutch football. The club are participating in the Eerste Divisie and the KNVB Cup. The season covers the period from 1 July 2022 to 30 June 2023.

== Players ==
As of 1 August 2022

No.	Pos.	Nation	Player
1	GK	NED	Hugo Wentges
2	DF	NED	Tyrese Asante
3	DF	LUX	Dirk Carlson
4	DF	NED	Boy Kemper (captain)
5	DF	NED	Denzel Hall (on loan from Feyenoord)
6	DF	NED	Dhoraso Moreo Klas
7	FW	NED	Xander Severina
8	MF	NED	Jordy Wehrmann (on loan from Luzern)
9	FW	NED	Thomas Verheydt
10	MF	NED	Max de Waal (on loan from Jong Ajax)
11	FW	NED	Joël Zwarts (on loan from Jahn Regensburg)
14	DF	NED	Silvinho Esajas
15	MF	NED	Sacha Komljenovic
16	FW	NED	Marius van Mil
20	DF	NED	Gylermo Siereveld

No.	Pos.	Nation	Player
21	MF	ARU	Gregor Breinburg
22	MF	NED	Nick Broekhuizen
23	GK	NED	Luuk Koopmans
24	MF	NED	Finn Dicke
25	DF	NED	Finn van Breemen
27	FW	IDN	Rafael Struick
28	GK	BFA	Kilian Nikiema
29	GK	NED	David van de Riet
30	FW	FRA	Malik Sellouki
31	DF	NED	Nigel Owusu
33	DF	NED	Daryl Werker
34	FW	BIH	Amar Ćatić
45	DF	ESP	Guillem Rodríguez
—	FW	NED	Abdel Belarbi

=== Out on loan ===
Note: Flags indicate national team as defined under FIFA eligibility rules; some limited exceptions apply. Players may hold more than one non-FIFA nationality.

No.	Pos.	Nation	Player
—	DF	NED	Michael Mulder (at Beveren until 30 June 2023)

== Pre-season and friendlies ==
Win Draw Loss Fixtures

22 July 2022 Friendly	ADO Den Haag (Netherlands)	2–1	(Belgium) Beveren	Tiel
19:00 CEST (UTC+2)				Stadium: Sportpark De Lok

4 December 2022 Friendly	ADO Den Haag (Netherlands)	0–3	(Netherlands) Sparta Rotterdam
14:00 CEST (UTC+2)

== Competitions ==
=== Overall record ===
Competition	First match	Last match	Starting round	Final position	Record							
Competition	First match	Last match	Starting round	Final position	Pld	W	D	L	GF	GA	GD	Win %
Eerste Divisie	5 August 2022	May 2023	Matchday 1		35	12	11	12	45	51	−6	34.29
KNVB Cup	18 October 2022	2 March 2023	First round	Quarter-finals	4	3	0	1	8	5	+3	75.00
Total					39	15	11	13	53	56	−3	38.46

Last updated: 28 April 2023
Source: Soccerway

=== Eerste Divisie ===
==== League table ====
Pos	Team	Pld	W	D	L	GF	GA	GD	Pts	Promotion or qualification
10	De Graafschap	38	15	7	16	64	54	+10	52	
11	Jong AZ	38	14	9	15	60	58	+2	51	Reserve teams are not eligible to be promoted to the Eredivisie
12	ADO Den Haag	38	13	12	13	51	57	−6	51	
13	Jong Ajax	38	12	10	16	69	72	−3	46	Reserve teams are not eligible to be promoted to the Eredivisie
14	Jong PSV	38	12	9	17	59	63	−4	45	Reserve teams are not eligible to be promoted to the Eredivisie

Source: Soccerway, Keuken Kampioen Divisie (in Dutch)
Rules for classification: Season in progress: 1) Most points won; 2) Less points lost; 3) Goal difference; 4) Goals scored; 5) Alphabetical order; End of season: 1) Points; 2) Goal difference; 3) Goals scored; 4) Head-to-head points; 5) Head-to-head goal difference; 6) Head-to-head away goals scored; 7) Play-off if relevant for deciding champion, relegation or participating in a European league, otherwise by draw. 8) Penalty shoot-out (only after a play-off)

==== Results summary ====
Overall								Home						Away					
Pld	W	D	L	GF	GA	GD	Pts	W	D	L	GF	GA	GD	W	D	L	GF	GA	GD
35	12	11	12	45	51	−6	47	6	5	7	28	29	−1	6	6	5	17	22	−5

Last updated: 28 April 2022.
Source: Keuken Kampioen Divisie

==== Results by round ====
Round	1	2	3	4	5	6	7	8	9	10	11	12	13	14	15	16	17	18	19	20	21	22	23	24	25	26	27	28	29	30	31	32	33	34	35	36
Ground	A	H	A	H	A	H	A	A	H	H	A	H	A	H	A	H	A	H	A	H	H	A	H	A	H	A	H	A	H	A	H	A	H	A	H	A
Result	L	L	L	W	L	D	W	D	L	W	W	D	L	L	D	L	L	D	W	W	D	D	W	W	W	D	L	W	L	D	W	D	L	W	D	
Position																																				

Updated to match(es) played on 28 April 2022. Source: Keuken Kampioen Divisie
A = Away; H = Home; W = Win; D = Draw; L = Loss

==== Matches ====
The league fixtures were announced on 17 June 2022.

5 August 2022 1	Heracles Almelo	4–0	ADO Den Haag	Almelo
CEST (UTC+2)

14 August 2022 2	ADO Den Haag	0–2	Den Bosch	The Hague
CEST (UTC+2)				Stadium: Bingoal Stadion

19 August 2022 3	MVV Maastricht	3–1	ADO Den Haag	Maastricht
CEST (UTC+2)

28 August 2022 4	ADO Den Haag	4–0	Jong Ajax	The Hague
CEST (UTC+2)				Stadium: Bingoal Stadion

2 September 2022 5	Willem II	1–0	ADO Den Haag	Tilburg
CEST (UTC+2)

9 September 2022 6	ADO Den Haag	2–2	Jong AZ	The Hague
CEST (UTC+2)				Stadium: Bingoal Stadion

16 September 2022 7	PEC Zwolle	1–2	ADO Den Haag	Zwolle
CEST (UTC+2)

12 September 2022 8	Jong Utrecht	1–1	ADO Den Haag	Utrecht
CEST (UTC+2)

30 September 2022 9	ADO Den Haag	1–3	Jong PSV	The Hague
CEST (UTC+2)				Stadium: Bingoal Stadion

7 October 2022 10	ADO Den Haag	1–0	FC Eindhoven	The Hague
CEST (UTC+2)				Stadium: Bingoal Stadion

14 October 2022 11	NAC Breda	1–2	ADO Den Haag	Breda
CEST (UTC+2)

21 October 2022 12	ADO Den Haag	2–2	De Graafschap	The Hague
CEST (UTC+2)				Stadium: Bingoal Stadion

28 October 2022 13	Helmond Sport	2–1	ADO Den Haag	Helmond
CEST (UTC+2)

4 November 2022 14	ADO Den Haag	2–3	VVV-Venlo	The Hague
CET (UTC+1)				Stadium: Bingoal Stadion

11 November 2022 15	Telstar	0–0	ADO Den Haag	Velsen
CET (UTC+1)

16 November 2022 16	ADO Den Haag	0–1	Roda JC	The Hague
CET (UTC+1)				Stadium: Bingoal Stadion

11 December 2022 17	Almere City	4–1	ADO Den Haag	Almere
CET (UTC+1)

16 December 2022 18	ADO Den Haag	0–0	TOP Oss	The Hague
CET (UTC+1)				Stadium: Bingoal Stadion

6 January 2023 19	Dordrecht	0–1	ADO Den Haag	Dordrecht
CET (UTC+1)

13 January 2023 20	ADO Den Haag	2–1	MVV Maastricht	The Hague
CET (UTC+1)				Stadium: Bingoal Stadion

22 January 2023 21	ADO Den Haag	1–1	Jong Utrecht	The Hague
CET (UTC+1)				Stadium: Bingoal Stadion

27 January 2023 22	VVV-Venlo	0–0	ADO Den Haag	Venlo
CET (UTC+1)

3 February 2023 23	ADO Den Haag	2–1	NAC Breda	The Hague
CET (UTC+1)				Stadium: Bingoal Stadion

13 February 2023 24	Jong PSV	1–2	ADO Den Haag	Eindhoven
CET (UTC+1)				Stadium: De Herdgang

17 February 2023 25	ADO Den Haag	3–1	PEC Zwolle	The Hague
CET (UTC+1)				Stadium: Bingoal Stadion

26 February 2023 26	Den Bosch	0–0	ADO Den Haag	's-Hertogenbosch
CET (UTC+1)				Stadium: De Vliert

6 March 2023 27	ADO Den Haag	0–3	Heracles Almelo	The Hague
CET (UTC+1)				Stadium: Bingoal Stadion

10 March 2023 28	TOP Oss	2–3	ADO Den Haag	Oss
CET (UTC+1)				Stadium: Frans Heesen Stadion

13 March 2023 30	FC Eindhoven	1–1	ADO Den Haag	Eindhoven
CET (UTC+1)

17 March 2023 29	ADO Den Haag	1–3	Willem II	The Hague
CET (UTC+1)				Stadium: Bingoal Stadion

31 March 2023 31	ADO Den Haag	3–1	Telstar	The Hague
CEST (UTC+2)				Stadium: Bingoal Stadion

7 April 2023 32	Roda JC	1–1	ADO Den Haag	Kerkrade
CEST (UTC+2)

16 April 2023 33	ADO Den Haag	2–3	Almere City	The Hague
12:15 CEST (UTC+2)	Verheydt 7'; Thomas 12'		Hansen 35'; Akujobi 46'; Duijvestijn 64'	Stadium: Bingoal Stadion; Referee: Danny Makkelie

21 April 2023 34	De Graafschap	0–1	ADO Den Haag	Doetinchem
20:00 CEST (UTC+2)			Verheydt 87'	Stadium: De Vijverberg; Referee: Robin Hensgens

28 April 2023 35	ADO Den Haag	2–2	Helmond Sport	The Hague
20:00 CEST (UTC+2)	Komljenovic 46'; Verheydt 79'		Van Keilegom 36'; Kaars 62'	Stadium: Bingoal Stadion; Referee: Erwin Blank

8 May 2023 36	Jong Ajax	v	ADO Den Haag	Amsterdam
20:00 CEST (UTC+2)
