= 2023–24 ADO Den Haag season =

ADO Den Haag
2023–24 season
- Manager: Darije Kalezić
- Stadium: ADO Den Haag Stadium
- Eerste Divisie: 2nd
- KNVB Cup: Quarter-Finals
- Average home league attendance: 7,586
- Biggest win: ADO Den Haag 6–0 Jong Utrecht
Home colours

The 2023–24 season is ADO Den Haag's 119th season in existence and third consecutive in the Eerste Divisie. They will also compete in the KNVB Cup.

== Players ==
=== First-team squad ===
As of 1 September 2023

No.	Pos.	Nation	Player
1	GK	NED	Hugo Wentges
2	DF	NED	Tyrese Asante
3	DF	NOR	Daniel Granli
4	DF	BEL	Matteo Waem
6	MF	NED	Kürşad Sürmeli
7	FW	NED	Daryl van Mieghem
8	DF	SUR	Dhoraso Moreo Klas
9	FW	NED	Henk Veerman (on loan from FC Volendam)
10	FW	NED	Jort van der Sande
11	FW	FRA	Malik Sellouki
14	DF	GER	Henri Koudossou (on loan from Augsburg)
15	DF	NED	Amir Absalem
16	MF	CUW	Calvin Gustina
17	FW	NED	Joel Ideho

No.	Pos.	Nation	Player
18	MF	NED	Silvinho Esajas
19	FW	NED	Jerry van Wolfgang
20	MF	NED	Sacha Komljenovic
21	FW	NED	Robyn Esajas
22	DF	USA	Justin Che (on loan from Brøndby)
23	GK	BFA	Kilian Nikiema
24	FW	NED	Mo Hamdaoui
25	DF	NED	Emre Ates
26	DF	NED	Gylermo Siereveld
27	FW	IDN	Rafael Struick
29	GK	NED	David van de Riet
33	DF	NED	Daryl Werker
—	DF	USA	Gennaro Nigro (on loan from Real Salt Lake)

== Transfers ==
=== In ===
Pos.	Player	Transferred from	Fee	Date	Source

=== Out ===
Pos.	Player	Transferred to	Fee	Date	Source

== Pre-season and friendlies ==
Win Draw Loss Fixtures

8 July 2023 Friendly	ADO Den Haag (Netherlands)	4–0	(Netherlands) SV VELO
16:00 CEST (UTC+2)

15 July 2023 Friendly	ADO Den Haag (Netherlands)	1–2	(Belgium) Dender
16:00 CEST (UTC+2)

22 July 2023 Friendly	ADO Den Haag (Netherlands)	1–2	(Belgium) Beveren
17:00 CEST (UTC+2)

25 July 2023 Friendly	ADO Den Haag (Netherlands)	4–0	(Belgium) SL16 FC
16:00 CEST (UTC+2)

28 July 2023 Friendly	ADO Den Haag (Netherlands)	1–1	(Netherlands) VVV-Venlo
16:00 CEST (UTC+2)

1 August 2023 Friendly	ADO Den Haag (Netherlands)	1–2	(Netherlands) Sparta Rotterdam
14:30 CEST (UTC+2)

5 August 2023 Friendly	ADO Den Haag (Netherlands)	3–0	(Belgium) Jong Genk
14:00 CEST (UTC+2)

== Competitions ==
=== Overall record ===
Competition	First match	Last match	Starting round	Record							
Competition	First match	Last match	Starting round	Pld	W	D	L	GF	GA	GD	Win %
Eerste Divisie	11 August 2023	10 May 2024	Matchday 1	28	15	8	5	58	34	+24	53.57
KNVB Cup	31 October 2023		First round	1	1	0	0	1	0	+1	100.00
Total				29	16	8	5	59	34	+25	55.17

Last updated: 1 March 2024
Source: Soccerway

=== Eerste Divisie ===
==== League table ====
Pos	Team	Pld	W	D	L	GF	GA	GD	Pts	Promotion or qualification
3	Roda JC Kerkrade (Note: Winner of the First Period (Rounds 1–9))	38	21	12	5	69	34	+35	75	Qualification for promotion play-offs
4	Dordrecht	38	18	15	5	74	51	+23	69	Qualification for promotion play-offs
5	ADO Den Haag	38	17	12	9	72	50	+22	63	Qualification for promotion play-offs
6	De Graafschap	38	19	6	13	61	52	+9	63	Qualification for promotion play-offs
7	Emmen	38	17	6	15	59	60	−1	57	Qualification for promotion play-offs

Source: Flashscore, Keuken Kampioen Divisie (in Dutch)
Rules for classification: Season in progress: 1) Most points won; 2) Less points lost; 3) Goal difference; 4) Goals scored; 5) Alphabetical order; End of season: 1) Points; 2) Goal difference; 3) Goals scored; 4) Head-to-head points; 5) Head-to-head goal difference; 6) Head-to-head away goals scored; 7) Play-off if relevant for deciding champion, relegation or participating in a European league, otherwise by draw. 8) Penalty shoot-out (only after a play-off)

==== Results summary ====
Overall								Home						Away					
Pld	W	D	L	GF	GA	GD	Pts	W	D	L	GF	GA	GD	W	D	L	GF	GA	GD
28	15	8	5	54	34	+20	53	8	4	2	35	18	+17	7	4	3	19	16	+3

Last updated: 1 March 2024.

==== Results by round ====
Round	1	2	3	4	5	6	7	8	9	10	11	12	13	14	15	16	17	18	19	20	21	22	23	24	25	26	27	28
Ground	A	H	A	H	A	A	H	A	H	A	A	H	A	H	H	A	A	H	H	A	H	A	H	A	H	A	H	H
Result	D	L	W	W	D	W	D	W	W	D	W	D	W	L	W	D	L	D	W	W	W	L	W	W	W	L	D	W
Position	13	18	13	9	10	5	8	2	3	5	3	3	3	4	3	4	4	4	3	3	3	3	3	2	2	3	3	

Updated to match(es) played on 1 March 2024. Source:
A = Away; H = Home; W = Win; D = Draw; L = Loss

==== Matches ====
The league fixtures were unveiled on 30 June 2023.

11 August 2023 1	De Graafschap	0–0	ADO Den Haag	Doetinchem
20:00 CEST (UTC+2)	Schoppema (yellow card) 60'; Raterink (yellow card) 82'	Report	Asante (yellow card) 65'; Sellouki (yellow card) 85'	Stadium: De Vijverberg; Attendance: 8,350; Referee: Jannick van der Laan

18 August 2023 2	ADO Den Haag	0–3	Roda JC Kerkrade	The Hague
20:00 CEST (UTC+2)		Report	Peña Zauner 11', 29'; Ould-Chikh 35'	Stadium: ADO Den Haag Stadium; Attendance: 5,895; Referee: Jeroen Manschot

25 August 2023 3	Den Bosch	1–2	ADO Den Haag	's-Hertogenbosch
20:00 CEST (UTC+2)	Boumassaoudi 74'	Report	Sellouki 54'; Van Mieghem 86'	Stadium: De Vliert; Referee: Martin van den Kerkhof

3 September 2023 4	ADO Den Haag	4–1	Jong AZ	The Hague
16:45 CEST (UTC+2)	Van der Sande 24', 49'; Waem 40', 54'	Report	Addai 4'	Stadium: ADO Den Haag Stadium; Attendance: 6,341; Referee: Clay Ruperti

15 September 2023 6	Groningen	0–1	ADO Den Haag	Groningen
20:00 CEST (UTC+2)		Report	Veerman 16'	Stadium: Euroborg; Attendance: 20,800; Referee: Serdar Gözübüyük

18 September 2023 5	Eindhoven	1–1	ADO Den Haag	Eindhoven
20:00 CEST (UTC+2)	Rottier 23'	Report	Veerman 37'	Stadium: Jan Louwers Stadion; Attendance: 2,350; Referee: Ingmar Oostrom

22 September 2023 7	ADO Den Haag	1–1	Telstar	The Hague
20:00 CEST (UTC+2)	Veerman 28'; Sürmeli (yellow card) 62'; Van der Sande (yellow card) 64'	Report	Apau (yellow card) 31'; Kaandorp 56'	Stadium: ADO Den Haag Stadium; Referee: Kevin Puts

12 November 2023 14	ADO Den Haag	1–2	SC Cambuur	The Hague
14:30 CEST (UTC+2)				Stadium: ADO Den Haag Stadium

27 November 2023 15	ADO Den Haag	6–0	Jong Utrecht	The Hague
20:00 CEST (UTC+2)				Stadium: ADO Den Haag Stadium

8 December 2023 18	ADO Den Haag	1–1	Willem II	The Hague
20:00 CEST (UTC+2)				Stadium: ADO Den Haag Stadium

23 February 2024 27	ADO Den Haag	2–2	MVV Maastricht	The Hague
				Stadium: ADO Den Haag Stadium

1 March 2024 28	ADO Den Haag	2–1	Jong Ajax	The Hague
				Stadium: ADO Den Haag Stadium

=== KNVB Cup ===
31 October 2023 First round	Noordwijk	0–1	ADO Den Haag	TBD
--:-- CET (UTC+1)
