= Yoon Do-young =

South Korean footballer (born 2006)

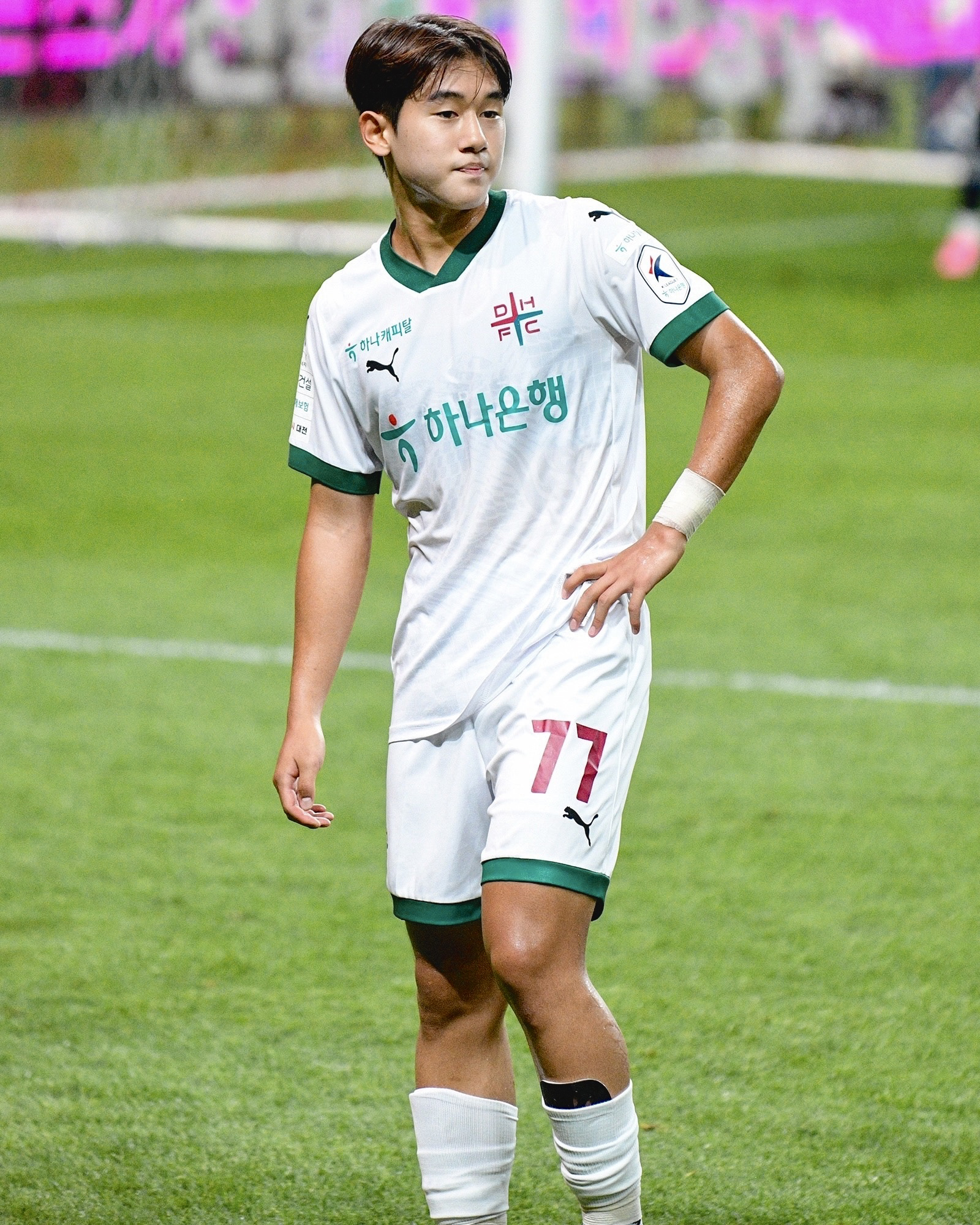
- Yoon in 2024

Personal information
- Date of birth: 28 October 2006 (age 20)
- Place of birth: Yongin, South Korea
- Height: 1.73 m (5 ft 8 in)
- Positions: Winger; attacking midfielder

Team information
- Current team: 1. FC Magdeburg; (on loan from Brighton & Hove Albion)
- Number: 27

Youth career
- 2020–2024: Daejeon Hana Citizen

Senior career*
Years	Team	Apps	(Gls)
2024	Daejeon Hana Citizen B	9	(3)
2024–2025	Daejeon Hana Citizen	31	(1)
2025–	Brighton & Hove Albion	0	(0)
2025	→ Excelsior (loan)	6	(1)
2026	→ Dordrecht (loan)	15	(1)
2026–	→ 1. FC Magdeburg II (loan)	8	(1)

International career^{‡}
2022–2023	South Korea U17	21	(12)
2024–2025	South Korea U20	12	(3)
2026–	South Korea U23	2	(0)
Medal record
Representing South Korea
Men's football
AFC U-17 Asian Cup
Runner-up	2023 Thailand
Korean name
Hangul	윤도영
RR	Yun Doyeong
MR	Yun Toyŏng
- * Club domestic league appearances and goals as of 31 October 2026 ‡ National team caps and goals as of 6 June 2026

Yoon Do-young (Korean: 윤도영; born 28 October 2006) is a South Korean professional footballer who plays as a winger for 2. Bundesliga club 1. FC Magdeburg, on loan from Premier League club Brighton & Hove Albion. He made his debut professional appearance in the 2024 K League 1 season with Daejeon Hana Citizen.

== Youth career ==
Yoon Do-young was born on 28 October 2006, in Yongin, Gyeonggi Province. He began playing football at Suji Junior when he was a first grade elementary school student. He later moved to Daejeon after being scouted by the under-15 team of Daejeon Hana Citizen. He scored 10 goals in 20 matches when he helped it win its first title at the middle school division of the K League Junior in 2021. After the club went on to win two additional youth championships that year, he was credited for playing a key role in the team's three domestic titles.

Yoon enrolled at Chungnam Mechanical Technical High School, which had the under-18 club of Daejeon Hana Citizen. While playing at the high school division of the K League Junior, he executed a hat-trick in the fifth round of Group B, followed by the club's first victory of the season with a final score of 6–0. He scored the winning goal in a 3–2 win over Yuseong Bio Science Technology High School, which allowed his high school to represent Daejeon at the high school competition of the Korean National Sports Festival.

== Club career ==
=== Daejeon Hana Citizen ===
Yoon signed a semi-professional contract (a small-scale contract with a youth team player) with Daejeon Hana Citizen for the 2024 K League 1 season, being known as the second semi-professional player at the club behind Ahn Tae-yoon. He made his first senior appearance on 25 May in a match against Ulsan, named the youngest player to debut in the club's history at 17 years, 6 months and 27 days. On 16 August, he became the club's first professional player to be promoted from a semi-professional player. On 1 September, he scored his first senior goal in the first 50 seconds of a match against Gwangju, becoming one of three high school students who scored at the K League 1 that year alongside Yang Min-hyeok and Kang Ju-hyeok.

=== Brighton & Hove Albion ===
On 21 March 2025, Daejeon Hana Citizen and Brighton & Hove Albion announced Yoon's transfer to Brighton. He signed a five-year contract from July 2025 to June 2030 with the Premier League club.

Yoon was loaned to Eredivisie club Excelsior directly after joining Brighton. He played only six matches for Excelsior as a substitute without a start during the first half of the 2025–26 Eredivisie. He terminated his contract with Excelsior early, and spent the remainder of the season at Eerste Divisie club Dordrecht.

On 5 July 2026, Yoon joined German 2. Bundesliga club 1. FC Magdeburg on a season-long loan for the 2026–27 season to continue his development with regular first-team football.

== International career ==
As an under-17 international, Yoon represented South Korea at the 2023 AFC U-17 Asian Cup and the 2023 FIFA U-17 World Cup. He scored one left-footed goal and one right-footed goal against Afghanistan in a Group B match of the U-17 Asian Cup. While helping South Korea reach the U-17 Asian Cup final, he and Kim Myung-jun both had four goals and one assist each. The two players finished as the second top goalscorers of the tournament after losing 3–0 to Japan in the final.

== Style of play ==
Yoon has been utilized as a right winger or attacking midfielder. He is a left-footed player and his dribbling and touch has been compared to Lee Kang-in in South Korea. Before the 2023 FIFA U-17 World Cup, FIFA selected him as one of five Asian talents, describing him as "a skilful dribbler who boasts the ability to contribute vital goals with his cultured left foot in a similar vein to Arjen Robben". By comparison, the assessments of his speed are not identical to each other. Jung Ji-hun, a journalist of FourFourTwo Korea, praised his speed, whereas himself and his international teammate Baek Ga-on did not.

== Personal life ==
Yoon cited Lionel Messi as one of his role models in addition to compatriots Son Heung-min and Lee Kang-in.

== Career statistics ==
=== Club ===
As of match played 31 October 2026

Club	Season	League			National cup (Note: Includes Korea Cup)		Total	
Club	Season	Division	Apps	Goals	Apps	Goals	Apps	Goals
Daejeon Hana Citizen B	2024	K4 League	9	3	—		9	3
Daejeon Hana Citizen	2024	K League 1	19	1	1	0	20	1
Daejeon Hana Citizen	2025	K League 1	12	0	1	0	13	0
Daejeon Hana Citizen	Total		31	1	2	0	33	1
Brighton & Hove Albion	2025–26	Premier League	0	0	0	0	0	0
Excelsior (loan)	2025–26	Eredivisie	6	1	1	0	7	1
Dordrecht (loan)	2025–26	Eerste Divisie	15	1	—		15	1
1. FC Magdeburg II (loan)	2026–27	Regionalliga Nordost	8	1	0	0	0	0
Career total			69	7	3	0	72	7

== Honours ==
South Korea U17

- AFC U-17 Asian Cup runner-up: 2023

Individual

- K League All-Star: 2024
