= Robyn Esajas =

Dutch footballer (born 2002)

Personal information
- Date of birth: 29 January 2002 (age 24)
- Place of birth: Rotterdam, Netherlands
- Height: 1.81 m (5 ft 11 in)
- Positions: Left-back; winger

Team information
- Current team: Chaves
- Number: 27

Youth career
- 2009–2019: Feyenoord
- 2020: 1. FC Nürnberg
- 2020–2021: AZ
- 2023–2024: ADO Den Haag

Senior career*
| Years | Team | Apps | (Gls) |
| 2023–2024 | ADO Den Haag | 4 | (0) |
| 2024–2025 | Fortuna Sittard | 0 | (0) |
| 2024–2025 | → MVV (loan) | 33 | (1) |
| 2025– | Chaves | 22 | (1) |
- * Club domestic league appearances and goals as of 20 June 2026

Robyn Esajas (born 29 January 2002) is a Dutch professional footballer who plays as a left-back or winger for Liga Portugal 2 club Chaves.

== Career ==
Born in Rotterdam, Esajas joined the Feyenoord youth academy at age seven, developing there for ten years. In January 2020, he joined 2. Bundesliga club 1. FC Nürnberg's under-19 team, but returned to the Netherlands six months later, signing with AZ's youth team for another brief stint before leaving in summer 2021.

In August 2022, Esajas trialled with ADO Den Haag and later signed a one-and-a-half-year deal in January 2023, joining their under-21 side. He made his professional debut on 11 August 2023, starting in a 0–0 draw against De Graafschap in the Eerste Divisie. He made four appearances that season, mostly as a substitute. In March 2024, he trialled with Emmen, though it did not lead to a contract.

In July 2024, Esajas signed with Eredivisie club Fortuna Sittard, and directly joined Eerste Divisie club MVV on a one-season loan deal. He made his debut for De Sterrendragers on 8 September 2024, replacing Rayan Buifrahi in the 60th minute of a 4–0 away loss to Telstar. He scored his first professional goal for MVV on 6 December in a 2–2 home league draw against Vitesse.

On 24 July 2025, Esajas signed a three-year contract with Liga Portugal 2 club Chaves.

== Personal life ==
Born in the Netherlands, Esajas is of Surinamese descent.

== Career statistics ==
As of match played 20 September 2025

Appearances and goals by club, season and competition
| Club | Season | League | | | KNVB Cup | | Other | | Total | |
| Club | Season | Division | Apps | Goals | Apps | Goals | Apps | Goals | Apps | Goals |
|---|---|---|---|---|---|---|---|---|---|---|
| ADO Den Haag | 2023–24 | Eerste Divisie | 4 | 0 | 0 | 0 | — | | 4 | 0 |
| Fortuna Sittard | 2024–25 | Eredivisie | 0 | 0 | 0 | 0 | — | | 0 | 0 |
| MVV (loan) | 2024–25 | Eerste Divisie | 33 | 1 | 2 | 0 | — | | 35 | 1 |
| Chaves | 2025–26 | Liga Portugal 2 | 2 | 0 | 1 | 0 | — | | 3 | 0 |
| Career total | | | 39 | 1 | 3 | 0 | 0 | 2 | 42 | 1 |
