= Lewis Schouten =

Dutch footballer (born 2004)

Personal information
- Date of birth: 4 February 2004 (age 22)
- Place of birth: Alkmaar, Netherlands
- Height: 1.91 m (6 ft 3 in)
- Position: Centre-back

Team information
- Current team: AZ
- Number: 4

Youth career
- –2014: VV HSV
- 2014–2024: AZ

Senior career*
Years	Team	Apps	(Gls)
2022–	Jong AZ	80	(4)
2023–	AZ	11	(1)
2025–2026	→ Excelsior (loan)	24	(1)

International career^{‡}
2021	Netherlands U18	3	(0)
2022	Netherlands U19	3	(0)
- * Club domestic league appearances and goals as of 25 October 2026 ‡ National team caps and goals as of 00:15, 8 August 2022 (UTC)

Lewis Schouten (born 4 February 2004) is a Dutch professional footballer who plays as a centre-back for Eredivisie club AZ.

== Club career ==
Schouten made his league debut in the Eerste Divisie for Jong AZ appearing as a substitute on 17 January 2022 against FC Dordrecht in a 2–0 defeat at the Stadion Krommedijk. Four days later he made his first start in a 2–0 win over VVV Venlo, it was Jong AZ's first win in four months. As well as Schouten, Mexx Meerdink and Misha Engel made their first professional starts. On 22 April 2022 Schouten signed a new contract with AZ to keep him at the club until 2027. He scored his first senior league goal on 3 February 2023 in a 4–3 win against VVV Venlo.

In April 2023 he played in the 2022–23 UEFA Youth League final against Hajduk Split as AZ ran out 5–0 winners.

On 1 July 2025, Schouten was loaned by Excelsior, freshly promoted into Eredivisie.

== International career ==
In September 2022 Schouten was included in the Dutch U19 squad.

== Personal life ==
His father is Ronald Schouten, who played for AZ in the early 1990s.

== Career statistics ==
As of match played 25 October 2026

Appearances and goals by club, season and competition
Club	Season	League			Cup		Europe		Other		Total	
Club	Season	Division	Apps	Goals	Apps	Goals	Apps	Goals	Apps	Goals	Apps	Goals
Jong AZ	2021–22	Eerste Divisie	11	0	—		—		—		11	0
Jong AZ	2022–23	Eerste Divisie	30	1	—		—		—		30	1
Jong AZ	2023–24	Eerste Divisie	20	1	—		—		—		20	1
Jong AZ	2024–25	Eerste Divisie	19	2	—		—		—		19	2
Jong AZ	Total		80	4	—		—		—		80	4
AZ	2024–25	Eredivisie	1	0	0	0	0	0	—		1	0
AZ	2026–27	Eredivisie	10	1	0	0	2 (Note: Appearances in UEFA Europa League)	0	1 (Note: Appearance in Johan Cruyff Shield)	0	13	1
AZ	Total		11	1	0	0	2	0	1	0	14	1
Excelsior (loan)	2025–26	Eredivisie	24	1	1	0	—		—		25	1
Career total			115	6	1	0	2	0	1	0	119	6

== Honours ==
AZ

- Johan Cruyff Shield: 2026
