= Joel Ideho =

Dutch association football player

Personal information
- Date of birth: 17 March 2003 (age 23)
- Place of birth: Tilburg, Netherlands
- Height: 1.75 m (5 ft 9 in)
- Position: Forward

Team information
- Current team: Sparta

Youth career
- 2015–2019: Willem II
- 2019–2020: Ajax
- 2020–2023: Arsenal

Senior career*
Years	Team	Apps	(Gls)
2023–2025	ADO Den Haag	46	(8)
2025–	Sparta	10	(0)
2025–2026	→ Volendam (loan)	25	(1)
- * Club domestic league appearances and goals as of 12:14, 13 November 2026 (UTC)

Joel Ideho (born 17 July 2003) is a Dutch professional footballer who plays as a winger for Eredivisie club Sparta Rotterdam.

== Career ==
Born in Tilburg, Ideho featured in the youth sides RKTVV and SC 't Zand, before joining the football academy at Willem II and then AFC Ajax, prior to joining Arsenal in October 2020. His time at Arsenal was hampered by injury. In August 2023, following his release from Arsenal, he joined ADO Den Haag on a two-year contract. He made his senior professional debut for ADO Den Haag on 11 August, 2023 away at De Graafschap in the Eerste Divisie.

On 4 February 2025, Ideho signed a three-and-a-half-season contract with Sparta Rotterdam. On 15 August 2025, Ideho joined fellow Eredivisie side Volendam on loan for the season, with no option to buy.

== International career ==
Born in the Netherlands, Ideho is of Nigerian descent. In April 2023, he was called up to a training camp held by the Nigeria national under-20 football team.

== Career statistics ==
As of match played 7 November 2026

Appearances and goals by club, season and competition
Club	Season	League			National Cup		League Cup		Other		Total	
Club	Season	Division	Apps	Goals	Apps	Goals	Apps	Goals	Apps	Goals	Apps	Goals
Arsenal U21	2020–21	—			—		—		1 (Note: Appearances in EFL Trophy)	0	1	0
Arsenal U21	2021–22	—			—		—		5	0	5	0
Arsenal U21	2022–23	—			—		—		4	0	4	0
Arsenal U21	Total		—		—		—		10	0	10	0
ADO Den Haag	2023–24	Eerste Divisie	25	4	4	1	—		2 (Note: Appearances in Promotion play-offs)	0	31	5
ADO Den Haag	2024–25	Eerste Divisie	21	4	1	0	—		—		22	4
ADO Den Haag	Total		46	8	5	1	—		—		63	9
Sparta Rotterdam	2024–25	Eredivisie	4	0	—		—		—		4	0
Sparta Rotterdam	2026–27	Eredivisie	6	0	1	0	—		—		7	0
Sparta Rotterdam	Total		10	0	1	0	—		—		11	0
FC Volendam (loan)	2025–26	Eredivisie	25	1	3	0	—		—		28	1
Career total			81	9	9	1	—		12	0	102	10

== Style of play ==
Ideho is described as a winger, with a preference for the left-wing.
