= Noah Naujoks =

Dutch footballer (born 2002)

Personal information
- Date of birth: 2 May 2002 (age 24)
- Place of birth: Oud-Beijerland, Netherlands
- Height: 1.83 m (6 ft 0 in)
- Position: Midfielder

Team information
- Current team: Excelsior
- Number: 10

Youth career
- 2010–2022: Feyenoord

Senior career*
Years	Team	Apps	(Gls)
2022–2023	Feyenoord	2	(0)
2023–	Excelsior	91	(16)
- * Club domestic league appearances and goals as of 17 May 2026

Noah Naujoks (born 2 May 2002) is a Dutch professional footballer who plays as a midfielder for Eredivisie club Excelsior Rotterdam.

== Career ==
=== Feyenoord ===
Naujoks joined the Feyenoord academy in 2010 and came through their system able to play a variety of positions in midfield, but prefers to play in an attacking number 10 role. In June 2020, aged 18 he signed his first professional contract with the club to keep him under contract until 2023.

Naujoks was training and playing with the Feyenoord first team in the summer training camps in 2021. He scored in a pre-season friendly against Werder Bremen. After completing another season for the Feyenoord under-21 team, he was training with the first team again in the summer of 2022.

Naujoks was given the 27 shirt number ahead of the new 2022–23 season. Naujoks made his debut in the Eredivisie on 7 August 2022, appearing as a substitute in a 5–2 win against Vitesse at the GelreDome. According to manager Arne Slot, Naujoiks earned those playing minutes based on his performances in training.

=== Excelsior ===
On 23 January 2023, Naujoks signed for Eredivisie club Excelsior Rotterdam on a two-and-a-half-year deal.
