= Hugo Wentges =

Dutch footballer (born 2002)

Personal information
- Date of birth: 11 February 2002 (age 24)
- Place of birth: Leiden, Netherlands
- Height: 1.98 m (6 ft 6 in)
- Position: Goalkeeper

Team information
- Current team: MVV Maastricht
- Number: 1

Youth career
- 2006–2012: ASC
- 2012–2022: ADO Den Haag

Senior career*
Years	Team	Apps	(Gls)
2022–2025	ADO Den Haag	33	(0)
2025–2026	Helmond Sport	3	(0)
2026–	MVV Maastricht	9	(0)

International career
2017–2018	Netherlands U16	2	(0)
2019	Netherlands U18	1	(0)
2022	Netherlands U21	1	(0)
- * Club domestic league appearances and goals as of 3 October 2026

Hugo Wentges (born 11 February 2002) is a Dutch professional footballer who plays as a goalkeeper for Eerste Divisie club MVV Maastricht.

== Club career ==
Wentges started the 2021–22 season as a back-up at ADO Den Haag but after first choice goalkeeper Luuk Koopmans suffered a serious shoulder injury, Wentges made his debut appearances in the Eerste Divisie. Ahead of the 2022–23 season Wentges was given the number 1 shirt number, and a new contract until 2025.

On 18 July 2025, Wentges signed a two-year contract with Helmond Sport.

In the summer 2026, Wentges moved to MVV Maastricht on a two-season deal.

== International career ==
In May 2022, Wentges received his first call up to the Netherlands national under-21 football team. Wentges made his U21 debut on 7 June 2022 when he started in goal against Gibraltar in a 6–0 win.

== Career statistics ==
As of match played 15 September 2023

Appearances and goals by club, season and competition
Club	Season	League			Cup		Europe		Other		Total	
Club	Season	Division	Apps	Goals	Apps	Goals	Apps	Goals	Apps	Goals	Apps	Goals
ADO Den Haag	2021–22	Eerste Divisie	9	0	0	0	—		5 (Note: Appearance(s) in Eredivisie promotion/relegation play-offs)	0	14	0
ADO Den Haag	2022–23	Eerste Divisie	18	0	0	0	—		—		18	0
ADO Den Haag	2023–24	Eerste Divisie	5	0	0	0	—		—		5	0
Career total			32	0	0	0	0	0	5	0	37	0
