= Gyan de Regt =

Dutch footballer (born 2003)

Personal information
- Date of birth: 18 September 2003 (age 23)
- Place of birth: Papendrecht, Netherlands
- Height: 1.76 m (5 ft 9 in)
- Position: Left winger

Team information
- Current team: Holstein Kiel
- Number: 11

Youth career
- –2016: VV Papendrecht
- 2016–2019: Dordrecht
- 2019–2020: Alphense Boys
- 2020–2021: Vitesse

Senior career*
Years	Team	Apps	(Gls)
2021–2025	Vitesse	65	(5)
2025–2026	Excelsior	35	(3)
2026–	Holstein Kiel	0	(0)

International career
2021	Netherlands U19	1	(0)
- * Club domestic league appearances and goals as of 22 August 2026

Gyan de Regt (born 18 September 2003) is a Dutch professional footballer who plays as a left winger for 2. Bundesliga club Holstein Kiel.

== Club career ==
De Regt made his Eredivisie debut for Vitesse on 13 March 2022 in a game against Heracles Almelo. He scored his first goal for Vitesse in the 20th minute against Heracles Almelo.

In summer 2025, de Regt joined Excelsior.

== International career ==
De Regt played once for the Netherlands national under-19 football team

== Honours ==
Individual

- Eredivisie Goal of the Year: 2025–26
