= Adam Carlén =

Swedish footballer (born 2000)

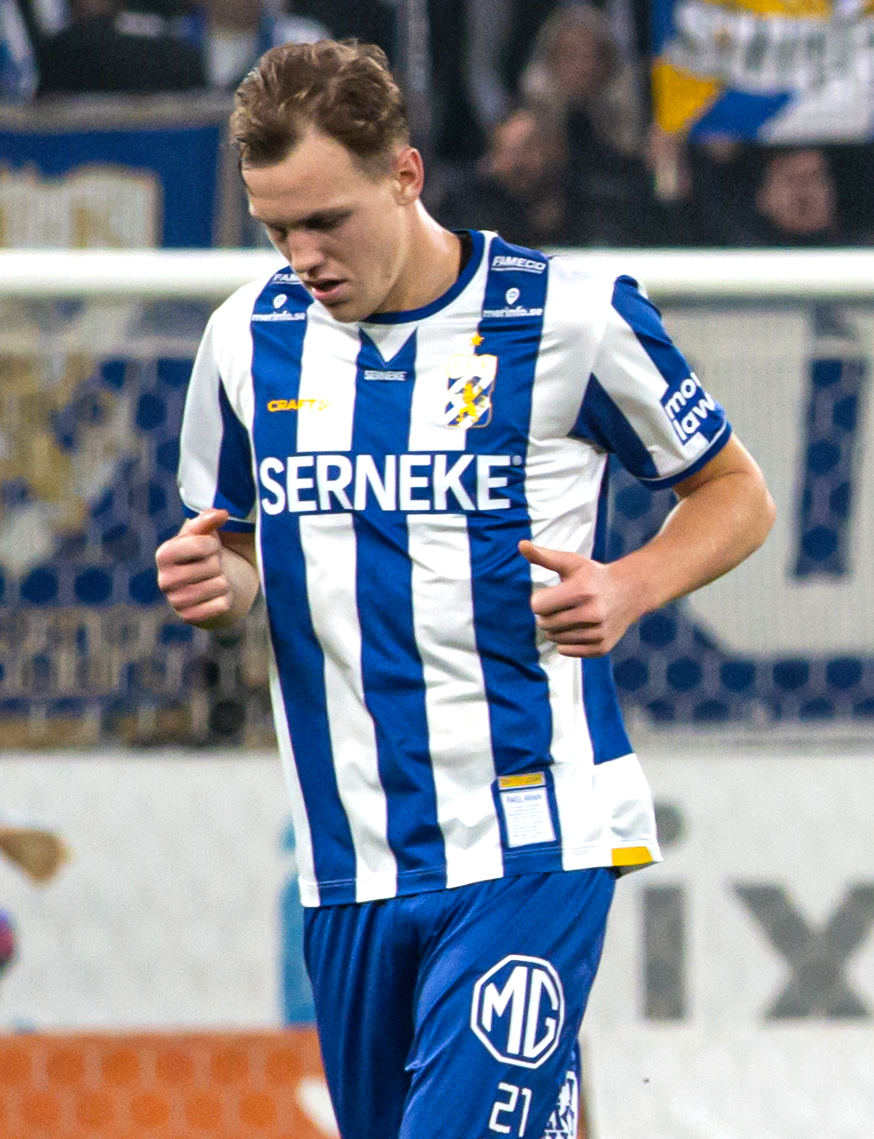
- Carlén with IFK Göteborg in 2023

Personal information
- Full name: Adam Erik Carlén
- Date of birth: 27 June 2000 (age 26)
- Place of birth: Mariestad, Sweden
- Height: 1.93 m (6 ft 4 in)
- Positions: Defensive midfielder; centre-back

Team information
- Current team: Artis Brno
- Number: 21

Youth career
- Björsäters IF
- –2015: IFK Mariestad
- 2016–2019: Degerfors IF

Senior career*
Years	Team	Apps	(Gls)
2015–2016	IFK Mariestad	5	(0)
2019–2022	Degerfors IF	99	(4)
2023–2025	IFK Göteborg	67	(3)
2025–2026	Excelsior	25	(0)
2026–	Artis Brno	0	(0)

International career
2021–2022	Sweden U21	2	(0)
- * Club domestic league appearances and goals as of 17 May 2026

Adam Erik Carlén (born 27 June 2000) is a Swedish professional footballer who plays for as a defensive midfielder for Czech First League club Artis Brno.
