= Irakli Egoiani =

Georgian footballer (born 2004)

Personal information
- Date of birth: 19 March 2004 (age 22)
- Place of birth: Tbilisi, Georgia
- Height: 1.68 m (5 ft 6 in)
- Position: Midfielder

Team information
- Current team: Excelsior
- Number: 8

Youth career
- –2012: Sportclub Markelo
- 2012–2013: FC Den Helder
- 2013–2017: Ajax
- 2017–2024: Twente

Senior career*
Years	Team	Apps	(Gls)
2024–2025	Vitesse	36	(8)
2025–	Excelsior	42	(8)

International career^{‡}
2022	Georgia U18	2	(0)
2023–2026	Georgia U21	18	(1)
2026–	Georgia	7	(0)
- * Club domestic league appearances and goals as of 3 November 2026 ‡ National team caps and goals as of 18 November 2026

Irakli Egoiani (Georgian: ირაკლი ეგოიანი, romanized: irak'li egoiani; Armenian: Իրակլի Եգոյան; born 19 March 2004) is a Georgian professional footballer who plays as a midfielder for Eredivisie club Excelsior and the Georgia national team.

== Early life ==
Egoiani was born on 19 March 2004 in Tbilisi, Georgia. Of Armenian descent through his parents, he moved with his family to the Netherlands at a young age.

== Club career ==
=== Vitesse ===
Egoiani came through the youth systems at Ajax and Twente but did not make a senior league appearance for Twente. In August 2024 he joined Vitesse and made his first start for the club on 30 August in a 1–1 home draw with FC Eindhoven in the Eerste Divisie. Georgian daily Lelo wrote in January 2025 that he had "established himself in the main squad of Vitesse, scored goals and made effective assists". He finished the 2024–25 season with nine goals and five assists and was voted Vitesse's Player of the Year.

=== Excelsior ===
On 19 August 2025, Vitesse listed him among the departing players, shortly after the KNVB's withdrawal of the club's professional licence was upheld by a court on 8 August 2025. The same day, Eredivisie club Excelsior announced his signing on a three-year contract through 2028.

== International career ==
Egoiani was initially called up to Georgia U16s for an international tournament held in Israel in March 2020. This is where he scored his first international goal in a 2–0 win over Belarus.

Two years later, Egoiani became a member of the U18s, taking part in a four-team tournament in Portugal.

Starting from the autumn of 2023, Egoiani made six appearances for the U21 team who successfully conducted their 2025 UEFA European Championship qualifying campaign. Egoiani took part in all three matches of Georgia's Euro Under-21. From 2026, Egoiani has been selected for Georgia's senior national football team. Initially, he played in two international friendly games before making his debut appearance as a substitute in a 2026–27 UEFA National League home game against Ukraine on 28 September 2026.

== Style of play ==
Egoiani plays as a midfielder. Right-footed, he is known for his work ethic.

== Career statistics ==
=== Club ===
As of match played 1 November 2026

Appearances and goals by club, season and competition
Club	Season	League			National cup		Other		Total	
Club	Season	Division	Apps	Goals	Apps	Goals	Apps	Goals	Apps	Goals
Vitesse	2024–25	Eerste Divisie	36	8	1	1	—		37	9
Excelsior	2025–26	Eredivisie	31	5	1	0	—		32	5
Excelsior	2026–27	Eredivisie	11	3	1	2	—		12	5
Excelsior	Total		42	8	2	2	0	0	44	10
Career total			67	13	2	1	0	0	69	14

=== International ===
As of match played 17 November 2026

Appearances and goals by national team and year
National team	Year	Apps	Goals
Georgia	2026	7	0
Total		7	0

== Honours ==
Individual

- Vitesse Player of the Year: 2024–25
- Keuken Kampioen Divisie Goal of the Season: 2024-25
