= Cedric Hatenboer =

Dutch footballer (born 2005)

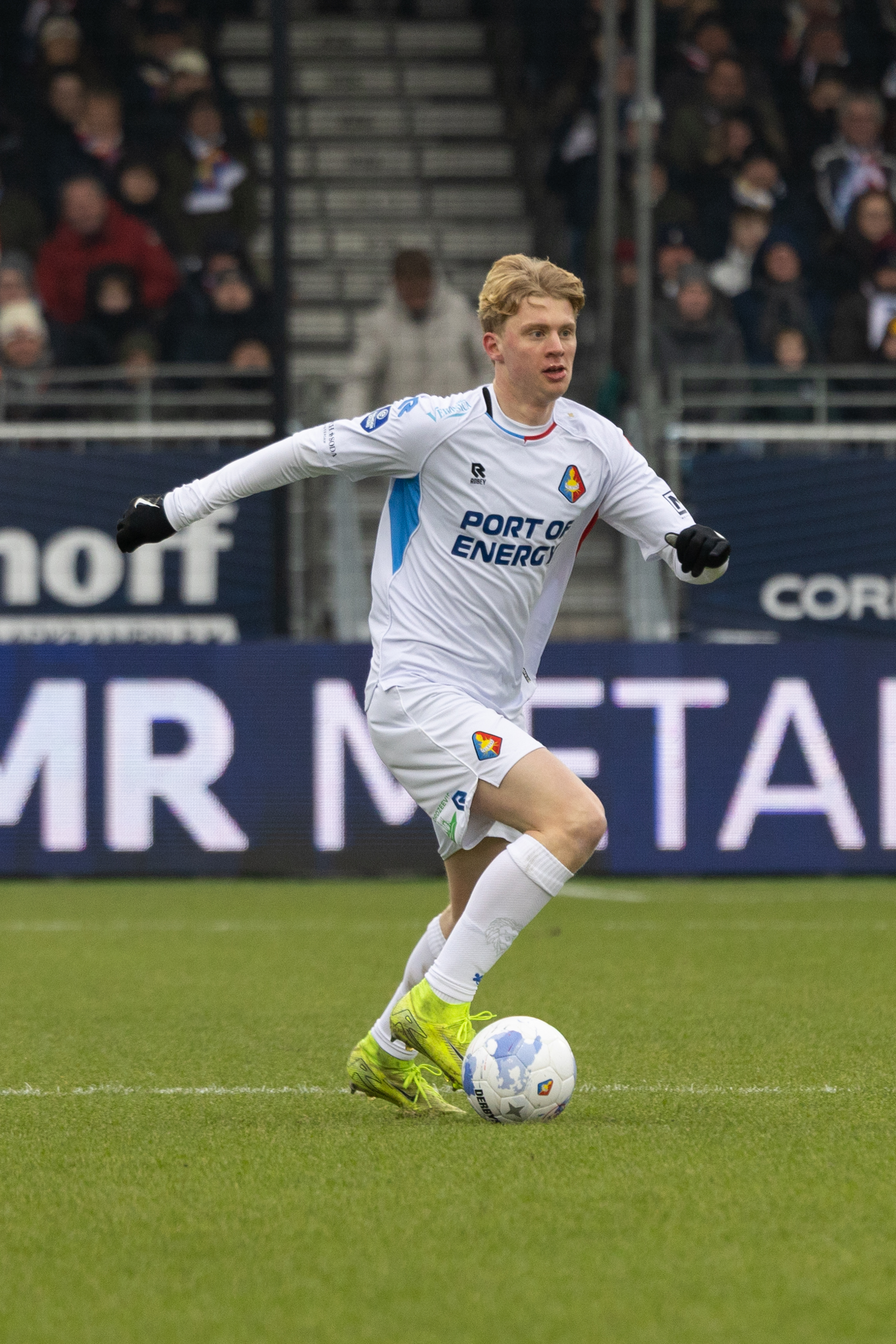
- Hatenboer with Telstar in 2026

Personal information
- Full name: Cedric Joriaan Hatenboer
- Date of birth: 19 March 2005 (age 21)
- Place of birth: Rotterdam, Netherlands
- Height: 1.88 m (6 ft 2 in)
- Position: Midfielder

Team information
- Current team: Sparta Rotterdam

Youth career
- 2011–2013: VOC
- 2013: Excelsior
- 2013–2015: Sparta Rotterdam
- 2015–2018: Ajax
- 2018–2019: Sparta Rotterdam
- 2019–2020: Alphense Boys
- 2020–2022: Feyenoord
- 2022–2024: Excelsior

Senior career*
Years	Team	Apps	(Gls)
2024–2025	Excelsior	25	(1)
2025–2026	Anderlecht	0	(0)
2025–2026	RSCA Futures	5	(0)
2026	→ Telstar (loan)	15	(0)
2026–	Sparta Rotterdam	8	(1)
- * Club domestic league appearances and goals as of 12:01, 13 November 2026 (UTC)

Cedric Joriaan Hatenboer (born 19 March 2005) is a Dutch professional footballer who plays as a midfielder for Eredivisie club Sparta Rotterdam.

== Career ==
=== Early years ===
Born in Rotterdam, Hatenboer began his footballing career with local amateur club VOC before joining the academy of Excelsior in 2013. Later that year, he moved across the city to the youth set-up of Sparta Rotterdam, where he continued his development.

In July 2015, Hatenboer was recruited by the academy of Ajax, joining one of the Netherlands' most prominent youth systems. During his time in Amsterdam, he featured for the club's under-14 side and was regarded as one of the more technically gifted players in his age group. Former Ajax and Netherlands international Marciano Vink later described him as "one of the stand-out players" in the Ajax youth ranks at the time, highlighting his passing range and technical ability. His development at Ajax was significantly disrupted by a serious illness in his early teenage years. After participating in a youth tournament abroad, Hatenboer contracted a legionella infection along with intestinal parasites, which left him without energy and forced him to the sidelines for approximately eight months. The illness led to substantial weight loss and required an intensive course of antibiotics before he was able to resume training.

Ajax were reportedly keen to retain Hatenboer beyond under-14 level, but he ultimately left the club after three seasons. Following his recovery, he chose not to remain in Ajax's intensified training structure and instead returned to Sparta Rotterdam. Ajax technical director Marc Overmars reportedly arranged a form of buy-back option, though Hatenboer declined a later opportunity to return, citing the prospect of living with a host family away from his parents. According to Vink, although the player himself wished to remain in Amsterdam, family circumstances also contributed to his return to the Rotterdam area. Hatenboer later spent the 2019–20 campaign with Alphense Boys before moving to the academy of Feyenoord. At Feyenoord, Hatenboer featured in the club's under-16 and under-17 sides in the national youth divisions. He later stated that he had been considered for a professional contract while playing for the club's under-18 side, but was ultimately released following discussions with technical director Frank Arnesen.

In July 2022, he rejoined Excelsior's youth academy, initially featuring for their under-18 team.

=== Excelsior ===
On 8 August 2024, Hatenboer signed his first professional contract with Excelsior, agreeing a deal until 2026 with an option for a further year. The contract followed a period of physical development with the club's under-21 team after an injury had limited him during the previous campaign.

He was introduced directly into the first-team squad for the 2024–25 season in the Eerste Divisie, starting each of the club's opening four league matches. On 30 August 2024, he scored his first senior goal in a 2–2 draw away to ADO Den Haag, registering his maiden strike in professional football. Hatenboer established himself as a regular starter during the campaign as Excelsior mounted a promotion challenge. At the conclusion of the season, the club secured promotion to the Eredivisie, marking Hatenboer's first senior honour.

=== Anderlecht ===
On 29 January 2025, Belgian Pro League club Anderlecht announced the signing of Hatenboer on a contract running until June 2029. Dutch and Belgian media reported that the transfer fee amounted to approximately €2.5 million, with performance-related bonuses and a sell-on clause included in the agreement with Excelsior. As part of the arrangement, he finished the season at Excelsior.

Following the completion of that campaign and Excelsior's promotion, Hatenboer formally joined Anderlecht ahead of the 2025–26 season. He initially featured primarily for the club's reserve side, RSCA Futures, competing in the Challenger Pro League, while adapting to senior football in Belgium. His prospects at Anderlecht diminished during the first half of the season, and he was not included in the squad for the club's winter training camp. According to Belgian newspaper Het Nieuwsblad, internal discussion also arose regarding a contractual clause which meant he could not be required to play for RSCA Futures. The club subsequently opted to arrange a loan move.

==== Loan to Telstar ====
Having found first-team opportunities limited during the first half of the 2025–26 season, Hatenboer returned to the Netherlands on 5 January 2026, joining Eredivisie club Telstar on loan for the remainder of the campaign. The agreement included an option to make the transfer permanent.

Hatenboer made his debut for Telstar—as well as his Eredivisie debut—on 11 January 2026, starting in defensive midfield in place of the injured Tyrone Owusu in a 3–2 home defeat to his former youth club Ajax. He was sent off in the 53rd minute following a challenge on Youri Regeer. A regular during his six months at Telstar, Hatenboer made 15 league appearances and provided three assists, helping the club secure survival on the final matchday.

=== Return to Sparta Rotterdam ===
On 31 August 2026, Hatenboer returned to Sparta Rotterdam, where he played as a junior, and signed a four-season contract with the club.

== Career statistics ==
As of match played 7 November 2026

Appearances and goals by club, season and competition
Club	Season	League			National cup (Note: Includes KNVB Cup, Belgian Cup)		Other		Total	
Club	Season	Division	Apps	Goals	Apps	Goals	Apps	Goals	Apps	Goals
Excelsior Rotterdam	2024–25	Eerste Divisie	25	1	2	0	—		27	1
Anderlecht	2025–26	Belgian Pro League	0	0	0	0	0	0	0	0
RSCA Futures	2025–26	Challenger Pro League	5	0	—		—		5	0
Telstar (loan)	2025–26	Eredivisie	15	0	2	0	—		17	0
Sparta Rotterdam	2026–27	Eredivisie	8	1	1	0	—		9	1
Career total			53	2	5	0	0	0	58	2
