= 2024–25 Excelsior Rotterdam season =

Dutch football club season

Excelsior Rotterdam
2024–25 season
- Stadium: Van Donge & De Roo Stadion
- Eerste Divisie: 2nd (Note: Promoted to Eredivisie.)
- KNVB Cup: R16
- Top goalscorer: League: Lance Duijvestijn (11 goals); All: Lance Duijvestijn (12 goals)
- Highest home attendance: 4,500 (12th week)
- Lowest home attendance: 2,650 (30th week)
- Average home league attendance: 3,423
- Biggest win: 5-0 (ADO Den Haag (a) 4th week Jong PSV (h) 37th week)
- Biggest defeat: 3-0 (Roda JC Kerkrade (a) 9th week)
- All statistics correct as of 18 November 2025.

The 2024–25 season was Excelsior Rotterdam's 32nd season in the Eerste Divisie (1st consecutive).

Excelsior Rotterdam finished the regular season in second place, securing promotion to the Eredivisie.

The club also competed in the KNVB Cup, where their campaign ended in the round of 16 following a 5–4 extra-time defeat to PSV Eindhoven.

Lance Duijvestijn was the top scorer of the club in this season with 12 goals; 11 goals in Eerste Divisie and 1 goal in the KNVB Cup.

Ilias Bronkhorst was the most appeared player in this season with 39 appearances; 37 appearances in the Eerste Divisie and 2 appearances in the KNVB Cup.

== Players ==
=== First-team squad ===
As of 4 February 2025

Note: Flags indicate national team as defined under FIFA eligibility rules; some limited exceptions apply. Players may hold more than one non-FIFA nationality.

No.	Pos.	Nation	Player
1	GK	NED	Calvin Raatsie
2	DF	NED	Ilias Bronkhorst
3	DF	NED	Kik Pierie
4	DF	NED	Django Warmerdam
5	DF	SWE	Casper Widell
6	MF	BEL	Xander Blomme
7	FW	ITA	Seydou Fini
8	MF	NED	Mathijs Tielemans
9	FW	SWE	Richie Omorowa
10	MF	NED	Lance Duijvestijn
11	FW	SWE	Oscar Uddenäs
11	MF	USA	Zach Booth
12	DF	FRA	Arthur Zagré
14	FW	CUW	Rayvien Rosario
15	MF	NED	Noah Naujoks
16	DF	NED	Jurgen Mattheij
17	DF	BEL	Nolan Martens

No.	Pos.	Nation	Player
18	DF	NED	Seb Loeffen
19	FW	NED	Nesto Groen
20	MF	NED	Lennard Hartjes
21	FW	BEL	Jacky Donkor
22	DF	NED	Jose de Almeida Reis
23	MF	NED	Cedric Hatenboer
24	MF	NED	Joshua Eijgenraam
26	DF	ARU	Kymani Nedd
26	MF	NED	Valentijn Zandbergen
28	FW	NED	Jelani Seedorf
28	MF	NED	Stjin Middendorp
29	FW	NED	Mike van Duinen
30	FW	NED	Sanches Fernandes
32	DF	NED	Siem de Moes
33	FW	NED	Jerolldino Armantrading
34	DF	NED	Serano Seymor
38	GK	NED	Pascal Kuiper

== Transfers ==
=== In ===
Pos.	Player	Transferred from	Fee	Date
FW	(Netherlands) Nesto Groen	(Netherlands) Feyenoord (U21)		11 July 2024
GK	(Netherlands) Calvin Raatsie	(Netherlands) FC Utrecht	€200,000	16 July 2024
DF	(Netherlands) Django Warmerdam	(Netherlands) Sparta Rotterdam	Free	23 July 2024
MF	(Netherlands) Lennard Hartjes	(Netherlands) Feyenoord	€250,000	26 July 2024
DF	(Netherlands) Ilias Bronkhorst	(Netherlands) FC Dordrecht	Free	6 August 2024
DF	(Netherlands) Seb Loeffen	(Italy) US Sassuolo Calcio (U20)	Free	13 August 2024
FW	(Curaçao) Rayvien Rosario	(Netherlands) Sparta Rotterdam		17 August 2024
FW	(United States) Zach Booth	(England) Leicester City F.C. (U21)		28 August 2024
GK	(Belgium) Nolan Martens	(Belgium) Young KRC Genk		24 January 2025
MF	(Netherlands) Mathijs Tielemans	(Netherlands) SBV Vitesse	On loan	4 February 2025

=== Out ===
Pos.	Player	Transferred to	Fee	Date
MF	(Belgium) Cisse Sandra	(Belgium) Club Brugge KV	End of loan	30 June 2024
MF	(Netherlands) Kenzo Goudmijn	(Netherlands) AZ Alkmaar	End of loan	30 June 2024
DF	(Netherlands) Mimeirhel Benita	(Netherlands) Feyenoord	End of loan	30 June 2024
FW	(Republic of Ireland) Troy Parrott	(England) Tottenham U21	End of loan	30 June 2024
DF	(Netherlands) Ian Smeulers	(Greece) Volos F.C.	Free	1 July 2024
MF	(Netherlands) Julian Baas	(Netherlands) Sparta Rotterdam	Free	1 July 2024
GK	(Netherlands) Norbert Alblas	End of career		1 July 2024
DF	(Netherlands) Redouan El Yaakoubi	Without club		1 July 2024
DF	(Belgium) Siebe Horemans	(Netherlands) FC Utrecht	Free	1 July 2024
GK	(Netherlands) Stijn van Gassel	(Netherlands) NEC Nijmegen	Free	1 July 2024
FW	(Morocco) Couhaib Driouech	(Netherlands) PSV Eindhoven	€3,500,000	7 July 2024
FW	(Greece) Lazaros Lamprou	(Poland) Raków Częstochowa	Free	9 July 2024
DF	(Netherlands) Sven Nieuwpoort	End of career		9 July 2024
FW	(Sweden) Oscar Uddenäs	(Sweden) AIK Fotboll	On loan	26 August 2024
MF	(Netherlands) Jeremy Udenhout	(Netherlands) Excelsior Maassluis	Free	2 September 2024

== Competitions ==
=== Overall record ===
Competition	First match	Last match	Starting round	Final position	Record							
Competition	First match	Last match	Starting round	Final position	Pld	W	D	L	GF	GA	GD	Win %
Eerste Divisie	9 August 2024	9 May 2025	Week 1	2nd	38	22	8	8	74	38	+36	57.89
KNVB Cup	29 October 2024	14 January 2025	1st round	Round of 16	3	2	0	1	9	7	+2	66.67
Total					41	24	8	9	83	45	+38	58.54

Source: ESPN

=== Eerste Divisie ===
==== League table ====
Pos	Team	Pld	W	D	L	GF	GA	GD	Pts	Promotion or qualification
1	Volendam (Note: Winner of the Second Period (Rounds 10–19)) (C, P)	38	26	4	8	87	48	+39	82	Promotion to the Eredivisie
2	Excelsior (Note: Winner of the Fourth Period (Rounds 30–38)) (P)	38	22	8	8	74	38	+36	74	Promotion to the Eredivisie
3	Cambuur	38	22	5	11	63	42	+21	71	Qualification for promotion play-offs
4	ADO Den Haag (Note: Winner of the Third Period (Rounds 20–29))	38	20	10	8	69	47	+22	70	Qualification for promotion play-offs
5	Dordrecht	38	20	8	10	69	46	+23	68	Qualification for promotion play-offs

Source: Flashscore, Keuken Kampioen Divisie (in Dutch)
Rules for classification: Season in progress: 1) Most points won; 2) Less points lost; 3) Goal difference; 4) Goals scored; 5) Alphabetical order; End of season: 1) Points; 2) Goal difference; 3) Goals scored; 4) Head-to-head points; 5) Head-to-head goal difference; 6) Head-to-head away goals scored; 7) Play-off if relevant for deciding champion, relegation or participating in a European league, otherwise by draw. 8) Penalty shoot-out (only after a play-off)
(C) Champions; (P) Promoted

==== Results summary ====
Overall								Home						Away					
Pld	W	D	L	GF	GA	GD	Pts	W	D	L	GF	GA	GD	W	D	L	GF	GA	GD
38	22	8	8	74	38	+36	74	14	3	2	41	14	+27	8	5	6	33	24	+9

Source: https://www.espn.nl/voetbal/stand/_/competitie/NED.1/season/2024

==== Results by round ====
Round	1	2	3	4	5	6	7	8	9	10	11	12	13	14	15	16	17	18	19	20	21	22	23	24	25	26	27	28	29	30	31	32	33	34	35	36	37	38
Ground	A	H	A	A	H	H	A	H	A	H	A	H	A	H	A	A	H	A	H	A	H	A	H	H	A	H	A	H	A	H	A	H	A	H	A	H	H	A
Result	L	W	D	W	W	W	D	W	L	W	W	L	W	W	W	D	W	D	D	D	W	L	W	L	L	D	W	D	L	W	W	W	W	W	W	W	W	L
Position																																						2

Source: ESPN
A = Away; H = Home; W = Win; D = Draw; L = Loss

=== Matches ===
==== 1st half ====
9 August 2024 1st week	TOP Oss	3-1	Excelsior Rotterdam	Oss
20:00	Giovanni Korte 46'; Abel Stensrud 49'; Tijmen Wildeboer 90+3'	Report	Richie Omorowa 7'	Stadium: Frans Heesen Stadion; Attendance: 1,950; Referee: Martin Fernando Perezlindo

16 August 2024 2nd week	Excelsior Rotterdam	3-1	De Graafschap	Rotterdam
20:00	Arthur Zagré 13'; Jacky Donkor 59'; Richie Omorowa 66'	Report	Philip Brittijn 90+5'	Stadium: Van Donge & De Roo Stadion; Attendance: 3,461; Referee: Alex Bos

25 August 2024 3rd week	SBV Vitesse	1-1	Excelsior Rotterdam	Arnhem
12:15	Andy Visser 52'	Report	Richie Omorowa 90+2' (pen.)	Stadium: Gelredome; Attendance: 15,120; Referee: Rob Dieperink

30 August 2024 4th week	ADO Den Haag	0-5	Excelsior Rotterdam	The Hague
20:00		Report	Noah Naujoks 22'; Richie Omorowa 58'; Cedric Hatenboer 63'; Mike van Duinen 82'; Jerolldino Armantrading 88'	Stadium: ADO Den Haag Stadium; Attendance: 8,356; Referee: Stan Teuben

13 September 2024 5th week	Excelsior Rotterdam	3-2	SC Telstar	Rotterdam
20:00	Jacky Donkor 30'; Seydou Fini 42'; Ilias Bronkhorst 76'	Report	Youssef El Kachati 68'; Mohamed Hamdaoui 89'	Stadium: Van Donge & De Roo Stadion; Attendance: 4,071; Referee: Joey Kooij

16 September 2024 6th week	Excelsior Rotterdam	4-0	VVV-Venlo	Rotterdam
20:00	Jacky Donkor 6'; Richie Omorowa 17' 22' (pen.); Jose de Almeida Reis 85'	Report		Stadium: Van Donge & De Roo Stadion; Attendance: 2,744; Referee: Jeroen Manschot

20 September 2024 7th week	FC Dordrecht	2-2	Excelsior Rotterdam	Dordrecht
20:00	Jaden Slory 71'; Ben Scholte 85'	Report	Lennard Hartjes 51'; Richie Omorowa 69'	Stadium: Stadion Krommedijk; Attendance: 3,423; Referee: Robin Hensgens

27 September 2024 8th week	Excelsior Rotterdam	4-2	Jong AZ	Rotterdam
20:00	Richie Omorowa 19' (pen.); Noah Naujoks 65'; Sanches Fernandes 76' 90+4'	Report	Kees Smit 6'; Ro-Zangelo Daal 11'	Stadium: Van Donge & De Roo Stadion; Attendance: 2,760; Referee: Richard Martens

4 October 2024 9th week	Roda JC Kerkrade	3-0	Excelsior Rotterdam	Kerkrade
20:00	Thibo Baeten 32'; Patriot Sejdiu 45+3'; Cain Seedorf 71'	Report		Stadium: Parkstad Limburg Stadion; Attendance: 9,052; Referee: Bas Nijhuis

18 October 2024 10th week	Excelsior Rotterdam	3-2	MVV Maastricht	Rotterdam
20:00	Seydou Fini 35'; Mike van Duinen 87' (pen.); Jerolldino Armantrading 90+2'	Report	Ilano Silva Timas 9'; Seb Loeffen 42' (o.g.)	Stadium: Van Donge & De Roo Stadion; Attendance: 3,491; Referee: Jochem Kamphuis

21 October 2024 11th week	Jong PSV	1-3	Excelsior Rotterdam	Eindhoven
20:00	Jesper Uneken 80'	Report	Noah Naujoks 9' 13'; Seydou Fini 23'	Stadium: De Herdgang; Attendance: 1,141; Referee: Laurens Gerrets

26 October 2024 12th week	Excelsior Rotterdam	0-1	SC Cambuur	Rotterdam
16:30		Report	Remco Balk 35'	Stadium: Van Donge & De Roo Stadion; Attendance: 4,500; Referee: Marc Nagtegaal

3 November 2024 13th week	Helmond Sport	0-1	Excelsior Rotterdam	Helmond
16:45		Report	Richie Omorowa 57'	Stadium: Stadion De Braak; Attendance: 3,034; Referee: Jannick van der Laan

8 November 2024 14th week	Excelsior Rotterdam	2-0	FC Eindhoven	Rotterdam
20:00	Lennard Hartjes 38'; Sanches Fernandes 45+1'	Report		Stadium: Van Donge & De Roo Stadion; Attendance: 3,350; Referee: Richard Martens

22 November 2024 15th week	FC Den Bosch	0-3	Excelsior Rotterdam	Den Bosch
20:00		Report	Arthur Zagré 34'; Noah Naujoks 42'; Jacky Donkor 68'	Stadium: De Vliert; Attendance: 6.208; Referee: Martin van den Kerkhof

26 November 2024 16th week	Jong FC Utrecht	0-0	Excelsior Rotterdam	Utrecht
20:00		Report		Stadium: Sportcomplex Zoudenbalch; Attendance: 495; Referee: Wouter Wiersma

29 November 2024 17th week	Excelsior Rotterdam	2-0	Jong Ajax	Rotterdam
20:00	Noah Naujoks 2'; Lance Duijvestijn 29'	Report		Stadium: Van Donge & De Roo Stadion; Attendance: 4,157; Referee: Kevin Puts

8 December 2024 18th week	FC Emmen	1-1	Excelsior Rotterdam	Emmen
16:45	Mike te Wierik 5'	Report	Lennard Hartjes 30'	Stadium: De Oude Meerdijk; Attendance: 7,954; Referee: Joey Kooij

13 December 2024 19th week	Excelsior Rotterdam	0-0	FC Volendam	Rotterdam
20:00		Report		Stadium: Van Donge & De Roo Stadion; Attendance: 3,414; Referee: Robin Hensgens

21 December 2024 20th week	VVV-Venlo	1-1	Excelsior Rotterdam	Venlo
16:30	Lasse Wehmeyer 90'	Report	Lennard Hartjes 53'	Stadium: De Koel; Attendance: 5,591; Referee: Marc Nagtegaal

==== 2nd half ====
10 January 2025 21st week	Excelsior Rotterdam	1-0	FC Dordrecht	Rotterdam
20:00	Lance Duijvestijn 60'	Report		Stadium: Van Donge & De Roo Stadion; Attendance: 3,747; Referee: Pol van Boekel

17 January 2025 22nd week	SC Cambuur	1-0	Excelsior Rotterdam	Leeuwarden
20:00	Matthias Nartey 43'	Report		Stadium: Kooi Stadion; Attendance: 12,117; Referee: Erwin Blank

26 January 2025 23rd week	Excelsior Rotterdam	1-0	ADO Den Haag	Rotterdam
12:15	Lance Duijvestijn 88'	Report		Stadium: Van Donge & De Roo Stadion; Attendance: 3,268; Referee: Bas Nijhuis

1 February 2025 24th week	Excelsior Rotterdam	1-3	SBV Vitesse	Rotterdam
16:30	Lance Duijvestijn 90+3'	Report	Bas Huisman 13'; Gyan de Regt 16'; Irakli Yegoian 72'	Stadium: Van Donge & De Roo Stadion; Attendance: 3,766; Referee: Clay Ruperti

10 February 2025 25th week	Jong Ajax	3-2	Excelsior Rotterdam	Duivendrecht, Amsterdam
20:00	Ahmetcan Kaplan 53'; Rayane Bounida 57'; Skye Vink 81'	Report	Ryan van de Pavert 22' (o.g.); Ilias Bronkhorst 60'	Stadium: Sportpark De Toekomst; Attendance: 616; Referee: Laurens Gerrets

16 February 2025 26th week	Excelsior Rotterdam	1-1	Helmond Sport	Rotterdam
16:45	Richie Omorowa 83'	Report	Anthony van den Hurk 59'	Stadium: Van Donge & De Roo Stadion; Attendance: 2,749; Referee: Rob Dieperink

21 February 2025 27th week	SC Telstar	1-3	Excelsior Rotterdam	Velsen-Zuid
20:00	Youssef El Kachati 72'	Report	Lance Duijvestijn 24' 62'; Kik Pierie 54'	Stadium: BUKO Stadion; Attendance: 2,683; Referee: Martin van den Kerkhof

2 March 2025 28th week	Excelsior Rotterdam	1-1	Roda JC Kerkrade	Rotterdam
16:45	Kik Pierie 59'	Report	Michael Breij 45+1'	Stadium: Van Donge & De Roo Stadion; Attendance: 2,873; Referee: Allard Lindhout

7 March 2025 29th week	De Graafschap	2-1	Excelsior Rotterdam	Doetinchem
20:00	Philip Brittijn 41'; Ibrahim El Kadiri 83'	Report	Sanches Fernandes 14'	Stadium: De Vijverberg; Attendance: 11,353; Referee: Jannick van der Laan

10 March 2025 30th week	Excelsior Rotterdam	3-1	FC Den Bosch	Rotterdam
20:00	Seydou Fini 32'; Mike van Duinen 77'; Sanches Fernandes 90+3'	Report	Danzell Gravenberch 41'	Stadium: Van Donge & De Roo Stadion; Attendance: 2,650; Referee: Ingmar Oostrom

14 March 2025 31st week	FC Eindhoven	1-2	Excelsior Rotterdam	Eindhoven
20:00	Joey Sleegers 54'	Report	Jerolldino Armantrading 47'; Mike van Duinen 83'	Stadium: Jan Louwers Stadion; Attendance: 2,325; Referee: Stan Teuben

28 March 2025 32nd week	Excelsior Rotterdam	3-0	Jong FC Utrecht	Rotterdam
20:00	Sanches Fernandes 41'; Lance Duijvestijn 47' 74'	Report		Stadium: Van Donge & De Roo Stadion; Attendance: 3,373; Referee: Laurens Gerrets

4 April 2025 33rd week	MVV Maastricht	1-2	Excelsior Rotterdam	Maastricht
20:00	Sven Braken 35'	Report	Lance Duijvestijn 86'; Mike van Duinen 90+2'	Stadium: De Geusselt; Attendance: 3,800; Referee: Erwin Blank

11 April 2025 34th week	Excelsior Rotterdam	2-0	TOP Oss	Rotterdam
20:00	Ilias Bronkhorst 15'; Casper Widell 57'	Report		Stadium: Van Donge & De Roo Stadion; Attendance: 3,472; Referee: Robin Hensgens

20 April 2025 35th week	FC Volendam	1-4	Excelsior Rotterdam	Volendam
16:45	Henk Veerman 82' (pen.)	Report	Sanches Fernandes 16' 23' 60'; Lance Duijvestijn 72' (pen.)	Stadium: Kras Stadion; Attendance: 6,957; Referee: Marc Nagtegaal

27 April 2025 36th week	Excelsior Rotterdam	2-0	FC Emmen	Rotterdam
16:45	Lance Duijvestijn 7'; Jerolldino Armantrading 37'	Report		Stadium: Van Donge & De Roo Stadion; Attendance: 3,447; Referee: Sander van der Eijk

2 May 2025 37th week	Excelsior Rotterdam	5-0	Jong PSV	Rotterdam
20:00	Casper Widell 8' 63' 73'; Jacky Donkor 15'; Sanches Fernandes 60'	Report		Stadium: Van Donge & De Roo Stadion; Attendance: 4,211; Referee: Edwin van de Graaf

9 May 2025 38th week	Jong AZ	2-1	Excelsior Rotterdam	The Hague
20:00	Rio Robbemond 34'; Sem van Duijn 88'	Report	Sanches Fernandes 24'	Stadium: AFAS Trainingscomplex; Attendance: 775; Referee: Wouter Wiersma

=== KNVB Cup ===
29 October 2024 1st round	Excelsior Rotterdam	2-1	VVV-Venlo	Rotterdam
21:00	Jerolldino Armantrading 3'; Noah Naujoks 32'	Report	Martijn Berden 18'	Stadium: Van Donge & De Roo Stadion; Attendance: 2,951; Referee: Ingmar Oostrom

17 December 2024 2nd round	FC Eindhoven	1-3	Excelsior Rotterdam	Eindhoven
20:00	Daan Huisman 51'	Report	Zach Booth 21' 29'; Jacky Donkor 90+5'	Stadium: Jan Louwers Stadion; Attendance: 1,721; Referee: Martijn Vos

14 January 2025 Round of 16	PSV Eindhoven	5-4 (a.e.t.)	Excelsior Rotterdam	Eindhoven
21:00	Malik Tillman 73'; Ricardo Pepi 86' 101'; Ismael Saibari 90+7'; Ivan Perisic 110'	Report	Noah Naujoks 45+3' 58'; Lance Duijvestijn 80'; Richie Omorowa 117' (pen.)	Stadium: Philips Stadion; Attendance: 22,300; Referee: Allard Lindhout

== Player statistics ==
=== Appearances and goals ===
No.	Pos	Nat	Player	Total		Eerste Divisie		KNVB Cup	
No.	Pos	Nat	Player	Apps	Goals	Apps	Goals	Apps	Goals
2	DF	(Netherlands) NED	Ilias Bronkhorst	39	3	37	3	2	0
3	DF	(Netherlands) NED	Kik Pierie	14	2	13	2	1	0
4	DF	(Netherlands) NED	Django Warmerdam	36	0	33	0	3	0
5	DF	(Netherlands) NED	Casper Widell	37	4	35	4	2	0
6	MF	(Belgium) BEL	Xander Blomme	9	0	9	0	0	0
7	FW	(Italy) ITA	Seydou Fini	34	4	33	4	1	0
8	MF	(Netherlands) NED	Mathijs Tielemans	13	1	13	1	0	0
10	MF	(Netherlands) NED	Lance Duijvestijn	24	12	22	11	2	1
11	MF	(Sweden) SWE	Oscar Uddenas	3	0	3	0	0	0
11	MF	(United States) USA	Zach Booth	21	2	19	0	2	2
12	DF	(France) FRA	Arthur Zagre	34	2	31	2	3	0
14	FW	(Curaçao) CUW	Rayvien Rosario	13	0	11	0	2	0
15	MF	(Netherlands) NED	Noah Naujoks	29	9	26	6	3	3
16	DF	(Netherlands) NED	Jurgen Mattheij	1	0	1	0	0	0
17	FW	(Sweden) SWE	Richie Omorowa	28	11	26	10	2	1
17	FW	(Belgium) BEL	Nolan Martens	6	0	6	0	0	0
18	GK	(Netherlands) NED	Seb Loeffen	5	0	4	0	1	0
19	FW	(Netherlands) NED	Nesto Groen	1	0	1	0	0	0
20	MF	(Netherlands) NED	Lennard Hartjes	21	4	20	4	1	0
21	FW	(Belgium) BEL	Jacky Donkor	36	6	33	5	3	1
22	DF	(Netherlands) NED	Jose de Almeida Reis	14	1	13	1	1	0
23	MF	(Netherlands) NED	Cedric Hatenboer	31	1	28	1	3	0
24	MF	(Netherlands) NED	Joshua Eijgenraam	27	0	24	0	3	0
26	MF	(Netherlands) NED	Valentijn Zandbergen	1	0	1	0	0	0
28	DF	(Netherlands) NED	Stjin Middendorp	3	0	2	0	1	0
28	FW	(Netherlands) NED	Jelani Seedorf	1	0	1	0	0	0
29	FW	(Netherlands) NED	Mike van Duinen	33	5	30	5	3	0
30	FW	(Netherlands) NED	Derensili Sanches Fernandes	34	11	32	11	2	0
30	FW	(Aruba) ARU	Kymani Nedd	1	0	1	0	0	0
32	DF	(Netherlands) NED	Siem de Moes	9	0	8	0	1	0
33	FW	(Netherlands) NED	Jerolldino Armantrading	33	5	30	4	3	1
34	DF	(Netherlands) NED	Serano Seymor	10	0	9	0	1	0
38	GK	(Netherlands) NED	Pascal Kuiper	4	0	3	0	1	0
40	GK	(Netherlands) NED	Calvin Raatsie	37	0	35	0	2	0

=== Clean sheets ===
#	Player	Eerste Divisie
1	(Netherlands) Calvin Raatsie	13

=== Disciplinary record ===
#	Player	Eerste Divisie		KNVB Cup		Total	
#	Player	Booked	Sent off (straight red)	Booked	Sent off (straight red)	Booked	Sent off (straight red)
1	(Netherlands) Kik Pierie	3	1	0	0	3	1
2	(Netherlands) Ilias Bronkhorst	9	0	1	0	10	0
3	(France) Arthur Zagre	5	0	1	0	6	0
4	(Netherlands) Calvin Raatsie	5	0	0	0	5	0
5	(Netherlands) Cedric Hatenboer	4	0	0	0	4	0
5	(Netherlands) Mike van Duinen	4	0	0	0	4	0
5	(Netherlands) Noah Naujoks	4	0	0	0	4	0
5	(Sweden) Richie Omorowa	4	0	0	0	4	0
9	(Netherlands) Casper Widell	3	0	0	0	3	0
9	(Netherlands) Jerolldino Armantrading	3	0	0	0	3	0
9	(Netherlands) Joshua Eijgenraam	3	0	0	0	3	0
9	(Netherlands) Lance Duijvestijn	3	0	0	0	3	0
9	(Netherlands) Siem de Moes	3	0	0	0	3	0
14	(Netherlands) Django Warmerdam	2	0	0	0	2	0
14	(Belgium) Jacky Donkor	2	0	0	0	2	0
14	(Netherlands) Lennard Hartjes	2	0	0	0	2	0
14	(Netherlands) Sanches Fernandes	1	0	1	0	2	0
14	(Netherlands) Seb Loeffen	1	0	1	0	2	0
14	(Netherlands) Serano Seymor	1	0	1	0	2	0
14	(Italy) Seydou Fini	2	0	0	0	2	0
14	(Belgium) Xander Blomme	2	0	0	0	2	0
22	(Netherlands) Mathijs Tielemans	1	0	0	0	1	0
22	(Curaçao) Rayvien Rosario	1	0	0	0	1	0
