= 2023–24 Excelsior Rotterdam season =

Dutch football club season

Excelsior Rotterdam
2023–24 season
- Chairman: Bob de Lange
- Manager: Marinus Dijkhuizen
- Stadium: Van Donge & De Roo Stadion
- Eredivisie: 16th (relegated)
- KNVB Cup: Round of 16
- Top goalscorer: League: Troy Parrott (10); All: Troy Parrott (17)
- Highest home attendance: 4,500 (NAC Breda Relegation Play-offs final 2nd match)
- Lowest home attendance: 3,497 (FC Groningen KNVB Cup Round of 16)
- Average home league attendance: 4,347
- Biggest win: 7-1 (ADO Den Haag (h) Relegation Play-offs Semi-final 2nd match)
- Biggest defeat: 4-0 (AZ Alkmaar (a) 25th week, Feyenoord (a) 34th week); 6-2 (NAC Breda (a) Relegation Play-offs final 1st match)
Home colours	Away colours
- All statistics correct as of 5 November 2025.

The 2023–24 season was Excelsior Rotterdam's 122nd season in existence and second consecutive in the Eredivisie, the top division of association football in the Netherlands.

The season was Excelsior Rotterdam's 24th season in the Eredivisie (2nd consecutive) and the team concluded the regular Eredivisie season in 16th place and relegated to Eerste Divisie after play-offs.

In the KNVB Cup, Excelsior Rotterdam's participation ended in round of 16 following a 2–0 defeat to FC Groningen.

Troy Parrott was the top scorer of the club in this season with 17 goals; 10 goals in Eredivisie and 7 goals in relegation play-offs.

Siebe Horemans was the most appeared player in this season with 41 appearances; 34 appearances in the Eredivisie, 4 appearances in relegation play-offs and 3 appearances in the KNVB Cup.

== Players ==
=== First-team squad ===
As of 1 February 2024

Note: Flags indicate national team as defined under FIFA eligibility rules; some limited exceptions apply. Players may hold more than one non-FIFA nationality.

No.	Pos.	Nation	Player
1	GK	NED	Stijn van Gassel (captain)
2	DF	BEL	Siebe Horemans
3	DF	NED	Kik Pierie
4	DF	NED	Redouan El Yaakoubi
5	DF	SWE	Casper Widell
7	FW	NED	Nikolas Agrafiotis
8	MF	BEL	Cisse Sandra
9	FW	IRL	Troy Parrott
10	MF	NED	Kian Fitz-Jim
10	MF	NED	Kenzo Goudmijn
11	FW	SWE	Oscar Uddenäs
12	DF	FRA	Arthur Zagré
14	FW	MAR	Couhaib Driouech
15	MF	NED	Noah Naujoks
16	DF	NED	Sven Nieuwpoort

No.	Pos.	Nation	Player
17	FW	SWE	Richie Omorowa
18	GK	NED	Norbert Alblas
20	MF	NED	Lennard Hartjes
21	FW	BEL	Jacky Donkor
22	MF	GRE	Lazaros Lamprou
22	DF	NED	Mimeirhel Benita
23	MF	NED	Lance Duijvestijn
28	DF	NED	Ian Smeulers
29	FW	NED	Mike van Duinen
30	FW	NED	Sanches Fernandes
32	DF	NED	Siem de Moes
33	MF	NED	Julian Baas
34	DF	NED	Serano Seymor
35	MF	NED	Jeremy Udenhout

== Transfers ==
=== In ===
Pos.	Player	Transferred from	Fee	Date
MF	(Netherlands) Lennard Hartjes	(Netherlands) Feyenoord	On loan	10 July 2023
DF	(Sweden) Casper Widell	(Sweden) Helsingborgs IF	€175,000	12 July 2023
DF	(Netherlands) Mimeirhel Benita	(Netherlands) Feyenoord	On loan	25 July 2023
FW	(Sweden) Richie Omorowa	(Sweden) IF Brommapojkarna		28 July 2023
FW	(Sweden) Oscar Uddenäs	(Sweden) BK Häcken	€357,000	29 July 2023
DF	(Netherlands) Ian Smeulers	(Norway) Sandefjord Fotball		21 August 2023
MF	(Belgium) Cisse Sandra	(Belgium) Club Brugge KV	On loan	22 August 2023
FW	(Republic of Ireland) Troy Parrott	(England) Tottenham Hotspur F.C.	On loan	24 August 2023
MF	(Netherlands) Kian Fitz-Jim	(Netherlands) AFC Ajax	On loan	31 August 2023
MF	(Netherlands) Lance Duijvestijn	(Netherlands) Almere City FC	€200,000	1 February 2024

=== Out ===
Pos.	Player	Transferred to	Fee	Date
MF	(Netherlands) Peer Koopmeiners	(Netherlands) AZ Alkmaar	End of loan	30 June 2023
FW	(Netherlands) Vicente Besuijen	(Scotland) Aberdeen FC	End of loan	30 June 2023
DF	(Germany) Maxime Awoudja	Without club		1 July 2023
MF	(Netherlands) Joshua Eijgenraam	(Netherlands) TOP Oss	On loan	26 July 2023
FW	(Netherlands) Reda Kharchouch	(Saudi Arabia) Al-Bukiryah FC		31 July 2023
DF	(Curaçao) Nathan Markelo	(Netherlands) Fortuna Sittard	Free	3 August 2023
DF	(Indonesia) Nathan Tjoe-A-On	(England) Swansea City A.F.C.	€350,000	13 August 2023
MF	(Netherlands) Kian Fitz-Jim	(Netherlands) AFC Ajax	End of loan	11 January 2024
MF	(Germany) Adrian Fein	(Germany) SC Verl	Free	29 January 2024
FW	(Netherlands) Nikolas Agrafiotis	(Germany) SV Wehen Wiesbaden		31 January 2024

== Pre-season and friendlies ==
Win Draw Loss Fixtures

22 July 2023 Friendly	NAC Breda (Netherlands)	2–0	(Netherlands) Excelsior
13:00 UTC+2	Janošek 14'; Vet 19'

28 July 2023 Friendly	Heracles Almelo (Netherlands)	2–1	(Netherlands) Excelsior
19:00 UTC+2	Limbombe 86'; Hornkamp 108'		Agrafiotis 59'
Note: Match was played in four 30-minute periods.

5 August 2023 Friendly	Zulte Waregem (Belgium)	0–1	(Netherlands) Excelsior
18:00 UTC+2			Naujoks 87'

14 August 2023 Friendly	Excelsior (Netherlands)	1–1	(Netherlands) Quick Boys
20:00 UTC+2	35'		59'

== Competitions ==
=== Overall record ===
Competition	First match	Last match	Starting round	Final position	Record							
Competition	First match	Last match	Starting round	Final position	Pld	W	D	L	GF	GA	GD	Win %
Eredivisie	13 August 2023	19 May 2024	Matchday 1	16th	34	6	11	17	50	73	−23	17.65
Relegation play-offs	22 May 2024	2 June 2024	Semi-final	Final	4	3	0	1	15	9	+6	75.00
KNVB Cup	1 November 2023	16 January 2024	First round	Round of 16	3	2	0	1	5	5	+0	66.67
Total					41	11	11	19	70	87	−17	26.83

Last updated: 2 June 2024
Source: ESPN

=== Eredivisie ===
==== League table ====
Pos	Team	Pld	W	D	L	GF	GA	GD	Pts	Qualification or relegation
14	Heracles Almelo	34	9	6	19	41	74	−33	33	
15	RKC Waalwijk	34	7	8	19	38	56	−18	29	
16	Excelsior (R)	34	6	11	17	50	73	−23	29	Qualification for the Relegation play-off
17	Volendam (R)	34	4	7	23	34	88	−54	19	Relegation to Eerste Divisie
18	Vitesse (Note: Vitesse were deducted eighteen points for breaking the license requirements set by the Royal Dutch Football Association.) (R)	34	6	6	22	30	74	−44	6	Relegation to Eerste Divisie

Source: Eredivisie
Rules for classification: Season in progress: 1) Most points won; 2) Less points lost; 3) Goal difference; 4) Goals scored; 5) Alphabetical order; End of season: 1) Points; 2) Goal difference; 3) Goals scored; 4) Head-to-head points; 5) Head-to-head goal difference; 6) Head-to-head away goals scored; 7) Play-off if relevant for deciding champion, relegation or participating in a European league, otherwise by draw. 8) Penalty shoot-out (only after a play-off)
(R) Relegated

==== Results summary ====
Overall								Home						Away					
Pld	W	D	L	GF	GA	GD	Pts	W	D	L	GF	GA	GD	W	D	L	GF	GA	GD
34	6	11	17	50	73	−23	29	4	7	6	29	27	+2	2	4	11	21	46	−25

Last updated: 10 November 2025.
Source: ESPN

==== Results by round ====
Round	1	2	3	4	5	6	7	8	9	10	11	12	13	14	15	16	17	18	19	20	21	22	23	24	25	26	27	28	29	30	31	32	33	34
Ground	A	H	H	A	H	A	H	A	H	A	H	A	H	A	A	H	A	H	H	A	H	A	H	A	A	H	A	H	A	H	A	H	H	A
Result	W	D	D	L	D	W	W	D	L	L	D	D	L	D	L	D	L	W	D	L	L	L	L	L	L	D	L	L	L	W	D	L	W	L
Position	6	6	8	12	11	7	5	5	6	7	7	7	10	10	12	12	15	9	11	14	15	15	15	15	15	15	16	16	16	15	15	16	16	16

Source: worldfootball.net
A = Away; H = Home; W = Win; D = Draw; L = Loss

=== Matches ===
==== 1st half ====
The league fixtures were unveiled on 30 June 2023.

13 August 2023 1st week	NEC Nijmegen	3–4	Excelsior Rotterdam	Nijmegen
12:15	Youri Baas 36'; Sontje Hansen 44'; Koki Ogawa 60'	Report	Nikolas Agrafiotis 12'; Casper Widell 53'; Richie Omorowa 73'; Oscar Uddenäs 90+10'	Stadium: Goffertstadion; Attendance: 12,207; Referee: Allard Lindhout

19 August 2023 2nd week	Excelsior Rotterdam	2–2	AFC Ajax	Rotterdam
16:30	Siebe Horemans 45+1'; Nikolas Agrafiotis 48'	Report	Brian Brobbey 25'; Davy Klaassen 72'	Stadium: Van Donge & De Roo Stadion; Attendance: 4,400; Referee: Dennis Higler

26 August 2023 3rd week	Excelsior Rotterdam	2–2	Fortuna Sittard	Rotterdam
21:00	Nikolas Agrafiotis 30'; Oscar Uddenas 73'	Report	Deroy Duarte 68'; Mouhamed Belkheir 78'	Stadium: Van Donge & De Roo Stadion; Attendance: 4,139; Referee: Robin Hensgens

2 September 2023 4th week	Heracles Almelo	3–1	Excelsior Rotterdam	Almelo
21:00	Bryan Limbombe 54'; Justin Hoogma 60'; Mohamed Sankoh 85'	Report	Nikolas Agrafiotis 19'	Stadium: Asito Stadion; Attendance: 11,185; Referee: Joey Kooij

17 September 2023 5th week	Excelsior Rotterdam	0–0	Almere City FC	Rotterdam
14:30		Report		Stadium: Van Donge & De Roo Stadion; Attendance: 4,400; Referee: Martin van den Kerkhof

23 September 2023 6th week	SC Heerenveen	0–3	Excelsior Rotterdam	Heerenveen
21:00		Report	Couhaib Driouech 21'; Nikolas Agrafiotis 45+2'; Troy Parrott 88'	Stadium: Abe Lenstra Stadion; Attendance: 19,630; Referee: Erwin Blank

1 October 2023 7th week	Excelsior Rotterdam	2–1	Sparta Rotterdam	Rotterdam
14:30	Arthur Zagre 73'; Troy Parrott 90+4'	Report	Jonathan de Guzmán 59'	Stadium: Van Donge & De Roo Stadion; Attendance: 4,400; Referee: Jeroen Manschot

7 October 2023 8th week	SBV Vitesse	0–0	Excelsior Rotterdam	Arnhem
21:00		Report		Stadium: Gelredome; Attendance: 13,887; Referee: Joey Kooij

22 October 2023 9th week	Excelsior Rotterdam	2–4	PEC Zwolle	Rotterdam
14:30	Zico Buurmeester 39' (o.g.); Troy Parrott 84'	Report	Younes Namli 47'; Apostolos Vellios 66' 81'; Lennart Thy 73'	Stadium: Van Donge & De Roo Stadion; Attendance: 4,400; Referee: Jannick van der Laan

29 October 2023 10th week	FC Volendam	3–1	Excelsior Rotterdam	Volendam
14:30	Benaissa Benamar 53'; Robert Mühren 57'; Milan de Haan 71'	Report	Couhaib Driouech 33'	Stadium: Kras Stadion; Attendance: 6,500; Referee: Alex Bos

4 November 2023 11th week	Excelsior Rotterdam	1–1	AZ Alkmaar	Rotterdam
18:45	Cisse Sandra 90+1'	Report	Mayckel Lahdo 72'	Stadium: Van Donge & De Roo Stadion; Attendance: 4,400; Referee: Laurens Gerrets

12 November 2023 12th week	FC Utrecht	2–2	Excelsior Rotterdam	Utrecht
20:00	Can Bozdogan 70'; Modibo Sagnan 90+3'	Report	Couhaib Driouech 53'; Lazaros Lamprou 62'	Stadium: Stadion Galgenwaard; Attendance: 20,235; Referee: Marc Nagtegaal

25 November 2023 13th week	Excelsior Rotterdam	2–4	Feyenoord	Rotterdam
16:30	Troy Parrott 16'; Lazaros Lamprou 72'	Report	Santiago Gimenez 6' 61' 82'; Quinten Timber 66'	Stadium: Van Donge & De Roo Stadion; Attendance: 4,400; Referee: Serdar Gözübüyük

2 December 2023 14th week	RKC Waalwijk	2–2	Excelsior Rotterdam	Waalwijk
20:00	Yassin Oukili 21' 60'	Report	Dario Van den Buijs 74' (o.g.); Julian Baas 80'	Stadium: Mandemakers Stadion; Attendance: 5,869; Referee: Bas Nijhuis

8 December 2023 15th week	FC Twente	4–2	Excelsior Rotterdam	Enschede
20:00	Manfred Ugalde 45'; Ricky van Wolfswinkel 59' (pen.) 80'; Younes Taha 85'	Report	Parrott 9'; Sven Nieuwpoort 13'	Stadium: De Grolsch Veste; Attendance: 29,000; Referee: Ingmar Oostrom

16 December 2023 16th week	Excelsior Rotterdam	1–1	Go Ahead Eagles	Rotterdam
18:45	Oscar Uddenäs 83'	Report	Jamal Amofa 54'	Stadium: Van Donge & De Roo Stadion; Attendance: 4,400; Referee: Alex Bos

==== 2nd half ====
13 January 2024 17th week	PSV Eindhoven	3–1	Excelsior Rotterdam	Eindhoven
21:00	Luuk de Jong 13' 17' 69'	Report	Sanches Fernandes 25'	Stadium: Philips Stadion; Attendance: 34,200; Referee: Marc Nagtegaal

19 January 2024 18th week	Excelsior Rotterdam	3–0	SC Heerenveen	Rotterdam
20:00	Couhaib Driouech 18'; Troy Parrott 24'; Lazaros Lamprou 63'	Report		Stadium: Van Donge & De Roo Stadion; Attendance: 4,400; Referee: Edwin van de Graaf

27 January 2024 19th week	Excelsior Rotterdam	1–1	FC Utrecht	Rotterdam
21:00	Siebe Horemans 65'	Report	Jens Toornstra 63'	Stadium: Van Donge & De Roo Stadion; Attendance: 4,400; Referee: Pol van Boekel

2 February 2024 20th week	Almere City FC	2–1	Excelsior Rotterdam	Almere
20:00	Stije Resink 43'; Casper Widell 68' (o.g.)	Report	Troy Parrott 26'	Stadium: Yanmar Stadion; Attendance: 4,222; Referee: Robin Hensgens

10 February 2024 21st week	Excelsior Rotterdam	0–3	FC Twente	Rotterdam
18:45		Report	Daan Rots 2'; Ricky van Wolfswinkel 5' 13'	Stadium: Van Donge & De Roo Stadion; Attendance: 4,400; Referee: Rob Dieperink

17 February 2024 22nd week	Sparta Rotterdam	4–2	Excelsior Rotterdam	Rotterdam
18:45	Arno Verschueren 24'; Tobias Lauritsen 31' 75'; Charles-Andreas Brym 90+6'	Report	Kik Pierie 11'; Lance Duijvestijn 16'	Stadium: Sparta Stadion Het Kasteel; Attendance: 10,459; Referee: Serdar Gözübüyük

25 February 2024 23rd week	Excelsior Rotterdam	1–2	SBV Vitesse	Rotterdam
12:15	Lance Duijvestijn 46'	Report	Paxten Aaronson 53'; Nicolas Isimat-Mirin 86'	Stadium: Van Donge & De Roo Stadion; Attendance: 4,400; Referee: Marc Nagtegaal

3 March 2024 24th week	Fortuna Sittard	5–2	Excelsior Rotterdam	Sittard
16:45	Justin Lonwijk 13'; Kaj Sierhuis 15' 29' 34'; Rodrigo Guth 68'	Report	Sanches Fernandes 61'; Richie Omorowa 82'	Stadium: Fortuna Sittard Stadion; Attendance: 10,306; Referee: Jeroen Manschot

10 March 2024 25th week	AZ Alkmaar	4–0	Excelsior Rotterdam	Alkmaar
12:15	Dani de Wit 13'; Vangelis Pavlidis 15'; Sven Mijnans 25' 72'	Report		Stadium: AFAS Stadion; Attendance: 18,195; Referee: Martin van den Kerkhof

16 March 2024 26th week	Excelsior Rotterdam	1–1	RKC Waalwijk	Rotterdam
20:00	Siebe Horemans 28'	Report	Mats Seuntjens 76'	Stadium: Van Donge & De Roo Stadion; Attendance: 4,400; Referee: Edwin van de Graaf

30 March 2024 27th week	Go Ahead Eagles	3–0	Excelsior Rotterdam	Deventer
20:00	Willum Þór Willumsson 41'; Gerrit Nauber 70'; Evert Linthorst 81'	Report		Stadium: De Adelaarshorst; Attendance: 9,767; Referee: Dennis Higler

2 April 2024 28th week	Excelsior Rotterdam	0–2	PSV Eindhoven	Rotterdam
20:00		Report	Mauro Júnior 58'; Johan Bakayoko 62'	Stadium: Van Donge & De Roo Stadion; Attendance: 4,400; Referee: Jannick van der Laan

6 April 2024 29th week	PEC Zwolle	2–1	Excelsior Rotterdam	Zwolle
20:00	Anselmo Garcia MacNulty 18'; Odysseus Velanas 66'	Report	Lance Duijvestijn 86'	Stadium: MAC3PARK Stadion; Attendance: 13,655; Referee: Martin Fernando Perezlindo

12 April 2024 30th week	Excelsior Rotterdam	4–0	FC Volendam	Rotterdam
20:00	Lance Duijvestijn 41'; Lazaros Lamprou 43' 67'; Troy Parrott 55'	Report		Stadium: Van Donge & De Roo Stadion; Attendance: 4,400; Referee: Danny Makkelie

24 April 2024 31st week	AFC Ajax	2–2	Excelsior Rotterdam	Amsterdam
21:00	Devyne Rensch 27'; Chuba Akpom 89'	Report	Julian Baas 38' (pen.); Lazaros Lamprou 53'	Stadium: Johan Cruijff Arena; Attendance: 55,076; Referee: Sander van der Eijk

6 May 2024 32nd week	Excelsior Rotterdam	0–3	NEC Nijmegen	Rotterdam
20:00		Report	Tjaronn Chery 60' 64'; Roberto González 90'	Stadium: Van Donge & De Roo Stadion; Attendance: 4,400; Referee: Bas Nijhuis

12 May 2024 33rd week	Excelsior Rotterdam	4–0	Heracles Almelo	Rotterdam
14:30	Troy Parrott 45+3' 66'; Couhaib Driouech 67' 90+5'	Report		Stadium: Van Donge & De Roo Stadion; Attendance: 4,400; Referee: Dennis Higler

19 May 2024 34th week	Feyenoord	4–0	Excelsior Rotterdam	Rotterdam
14:30	Gernot Trauner 48'; Ondrej Lingr 63'; Dávid Hancko 75'; Lutsharel Geertruida 86' (pen.)	Report		Stadium: De Kuip; Attendance: 43,000; Referee: Allard Lindhout

=== Relegation Play-offs ===
22 May 2024 Semi-final; 1st match	ADO Den Haag	1–2	Excelsior Rotterdam	The Hague
18:45	Henk Veerman 71'	Report	Couhaib Driouech 16'; Lance Duijvestijn 23'	Stadium: Bingoal Stadium; Attendance: 11,935; Referee: Robin Vereijken, Sander van der Eijk

25 May 2024 Semi-final; 2nd match	Excelsior Rotterdam	7–1	ADO Den Haag	Rotterdam
20:00	Troy Parrott 3' 27' 31'; Couhaib Driouech 40'; Julian Baas 55' (pen.); Kenzo Goudmijn 71'; Lazaros Lamprou 72'	Report	Henk Veerman 45+2'	Stadium: Van Donge & De Roo Stadion; Attendance: 4,400; Referee: Jeroen Manschot

Excelsior Rotterdam won 9–2 on aggregate.

28 May 2024 Final; 1st match	NAC Breda	6–2	Excelsior Rotterdam	Breda
20:00	Aime Omgba 12'; Dominik Janošek 39' (pen.); Jan van den Bergh 42'; Martin Koscelnik 74'; Elías Már Ómarsson 78' 90+4'	Report	Lance Duijvestijn 25'; Troy Parrott 45+6' (pen.)	Stadium: Rat Verlegh Stadion; Attendance: 19,000; Referee: Dennis Higler

2 June 2024 Final; 2nd match	Excelsior Rotterdam	4–1	NAC Breda	Rotterdam
18:00	Troy Parrott 20' 35' (pen.) 50'; Sanches Fernandes 42'	Report	Casper Staring 58'	Stadium: Van Donge & De Roo Stadion; Attendance: 4,500; Referee: Danny Makkelie

NAC Breda won 7–6 on aggregate.

=== KNVB Cup ===
1 November 2023 1st round	FC Den Bosch	1–2 (a.e.t.)	Excelsior Rotterdam	's-Hertogenbosch
21:00	Jaron Vicario 90+7'	Report	Siebe Horemans 37'; Julian Baas 96' (pen.)	Stadium: De Vliert; Attendance: 3,754; Referee: Pol van Boekel

19 December 2023 2nd round	SV Spakenburg	2–3 (a.e.t.)	Excelsior Rotterdam	Bunschoten
20:00	Ahmed El Azzouti 24' 64'	Report	Lazaros Lamprou 36'; Maties Artien 75' (o.g.); Nikolas Agrafiotis 99'	Stadium: Sportpark De Westmaat; Attendance: 4,733; Referee: Boyd van Kommer

16 January 2024 Round of 16	Excelsior Rotterdam	0–2	FC Groningen	Rotterdam
20:00		Report	Romano Postema 72' 78'	Stadium: Van Donge & De Roo Stadion; Attendance: 3,497; Referee: Martin van den Kerkhof

== Player statistics ==
=== Appearances and goals ===
No.	Pos	Nat	Player	Total		Eredivisie		Relegation Playoffs		KNVB Cup	
No.	Pos	Nat	Player	Apps	Goals	Apps	Goals	Apps	Goals	Apps	Goals
1	GK	(Netherlands) NED	Stijn van Gassel	38	0	34	0	4	0	0	0
2	DF	(Belgium) BEL	Siebe Horemans	41	4	34	3	4	0	3	1
3	DF	(Netherlands) NED	Kik Pierie	5	1	5	1	0	0	0	0
4	MF	(Greece) GRE	Lazaros Lamprou	35	8	28	6	4	1	3	1
4	DF	(Netherlands) NED	Redouan El Yaakoubi	33	0	27	0	3	0	3	0
5	DF	(Netherlands) NED	Casper Widell	34	1	30	1	2	0	2	0
7	FW	(Netherlands) NED	Nikolas Agrafiotis	21	6	18	5	0	0	3	1
8	MF	(Belgium) BEL	Cisse Sandra	31	1	26	1	4	0	1	0
9	FW	(Republic of Ireland) IRL	Troy Parrott	32	17	25	10	4	7	3	0
10	MF	(Netherlands) NED	Kenzo Goudmijn	23	1	18	0	4	1	1	0
10	MF	(Netherlands) NED	Kian Fitz-Jim	12	0	10	0	0	0	2	0
11	MF	(Sweden) SWE	Oscar Uddenas	26	3	23	3	0	0	3	0
12	DF	(France) FRA	Arthur Zagre	33	1	28	1	3	0	2	0
14	FW	(Morocco) MAR	Couhaib Driouech	33	8	26	6	4	2	3	0
15	MF	(Netherlands) NED	Noah Naujoks	26	0	23	0	1	0	2	0
16	DF	(Netherlands) NED	Sven Nieuwpoort	26	1	22	1	1	0	3	0
17	FW	(Sweden) SWE	Richie Omorowa	24	2	22	2	2	0	0	0
18	GK	(Netherlands) NED	Norbert Alblas	3	0	0	0	0	0	3	0
20	MF	(Netherlands) NED	Lennard Hartjes	1	0	1	0	0	0	0	0
21	FW	(Belgium) BEL	Jacky Donkor	2	0	0	0	2	0	0	0
22	DF	(Netherlands) NED	Mimeirhel Benita	27	0	20	0	4	0	3	0
23	MF	(Netherlands) NED	Lance Duijvestijn	17	5	14	3	3	2	0	0
28	DF	(Netherlands) NED	Ian Smeulers	7	0	6	0	0	0	1	0
29	FW	(Netherlands) NED	Mike van Duinen	9	0	7	0	1	0	1	0
30	FW	(Netherlands) NED	Derensili Sanches Fernandes	33	3	30	2	1	1	2	0
32	DF	(Netherlands) NED	Siem de Moes	9	0	7	0	2	0	0	0
33	MF	(Netherlands) NED	Julian Baas	40	4	33	2	4	1	3	1
34	DF	(Netherlands) NED	Serano Seymor	9	0	9	0	0	0	0	0
35	MF	(Netherlands) NED	Jeremy Udenhout	2	0	2	0	0	0	0	0

=== Clean sheets ===
#	Player	Eredivisie
1	(Netherlands) Stijn van Gassel	6

=== Disciplinary record ===
#	Player	Eredivisie		Relegation play-offs		KNVB Cup		Total	
#	Player	Yellow card	Red card	Yellow card	Red card	Yellow card	Red card	Yellow card	Red card
1	(France) Arthur Zagre	6	1	0	1	0	0	6	2
2	(Belgium) Siebe Horemans	4	1	0	0	0	0	4	1
3	(Greece) Lazaros Lamprou	2	1	1	0	0	0	3	1
4	(Republic of Ireland) Troy Parrott	2	1	0	0	0	0	2	1
5	(Netherlands) Lance Duijvestijn	1	0	0	1	0	0	1	1
6	(Netherlands) Nikolas Agrafiotis	0	0	0	0	0	1	0	1
7	(Netherlands) Julian Baas	8	0	0	0	0	0	8	0
8	(Morocco) Couhaib Driouech	4	0	0	0	0	0	4	0
9	(Netherlands) Siem De Moes	3	0	0	0	0	0	3	0
10	(Netherlands) Casper Widell	2	0	0	0	0	0	2	0
10	(Belgium) Cisse Sandra	2	0	0	0	0	0	2	0
10	(Netherlands) Kenzo Goudmijn	2	0	0	0	0	0	2	0
10	(Netherlands) Mimeirhel Benita	2	0	0	0	0	0	2	0
10	(Netherlands) Redouan El Yaakoubi	2	0	0	0	0	0	2	0
10	(Netherlands) Sven Nieuwpoort	2	0	0	0	0	0	2	0
16	(Netherlands) Ian Smeulers	1	0	0	0	0	0	1	0
16	(Netherlands) Kian Fitz-Jim	1	0	0	0	0	0	1	0
16	(Netherlands) Mike van Duinen	1	0	0	0	0	0	1	0
16	(Netherlands) Noah Naujoks	1	0	0	0	0	0	1	0
16	(Sweden) Oscar Uddenas	1	0	0	0	0	0	1	0
16	(Sweden) Richie Omorowa	1	0	0	0	0	0	1	0
16	(Netherlands) Serano Seymor	1	0	0	0	0	0	1	0
