= Jerolldino Bergraaf =

Curaçaoan footballer (born 2006)

Personal information
- Birth name: Jerolldino Armantrading
- Date of birth: 5 July 2006 (age 20)
- Place of birth: Rotterdam, Netherlands
- Height: 1.90 m (6 ft 3 in)
- Position: Striker

Team information
- Current team: Jong AZ (on loan from Excelsior)

Youth career
- –2017: SV Charlois
- 2017–2024: Excelsior

Senior career*
Years	Team	Apps	(Gls)
2024–	Excelsior	52	(4)
2026–	→ Jong AZ (loan)	9	(4)
2026–	→ AZ (loan)	1	(0)

International career
2024	Netherlands U19	5	(2)
2026–	Curaçao	1	(0)
- * Club domestic league appearances and goals

Jerolldino Bergraaf (né Armantrading; born 5 July 2006) is a professional footballer who plays as a winger for Eerste Divisie club Jong AZ, on loan from Eredivisie club Excelsior. Born in the Netherlands, he represents the Curaçao national team.

== Club career ==
=== Excelsior ===
Bergraaf began his football development in the youth teams of SV Charlois before joining the academy of Excelsior at the age of eleven. Ahead of the 2024–25 season, he was promoted to Excelsior's first-team squad.

He made his professional debut on 9 August 2024 in an away match against TOP Oss in the second-tier Eerste Divisie. Bergraaf began the match on the bench and was introduced by head coach Ruben den Uil in the second half as a substitute for Richie Omorowa. Twenty days after his debut, Bergraaf signed his first professional contract with Excelsior. The following day, he scored his first professional goal in a 5–0 away victory over ADO Den Haag, completing the scoring late in the match. Bergraaf made his first competitive start on 18 October 2024, also scoring the decisive goal in injury time as Excelsior secured a 3–2 home victory over MVV. On 6 May 2025, he signed a contract extension that tied him to the club until 2028. Three days earlier, Excelsior had secured promotion back to the Eredivisie after one season in the second tier.

He made his Eredivisie debut on 9 August 2025, the opening matchday of the 2025–26 season, coming on as a 71st-minute substitute for Mike van Duinen in a 5–0 defeat to NEC. From November 2025, Bergraaf was used more frequently as the starting centre-forward under head coach.

==== Loan to AZ ====
On 8 July 2026, Bergraaf joined AZ on loan for the 2026–27 season, with an option to buy. He was assigned to the reserve team, Jong AZ, competing in the second-tier Eerste Divisie.

== International career ==
Bergraaf received his first call-up for the Netherlands under-19 team in October 2024, appearing and scoring a goal in a 4–1 friendly loss to England U19 on 12 October 2024 during a training camp in Marbella. He was part of the squad for UEFA European Under-19 Championship qualification matches in November 2024 under coach Peter van der Veen, contributing to the team's efforts in the first round of qualifying fixtures.

Born in the Netherlands and of Curaçaoan descent, Bergraaf is eligible to represent either Netherlands or Curaçao at senior international level. In December 2025, Dick Advocaat, head coach of the Curaçao national team, publicly stated that Bergraaf was being monitored as a potential future international, citing his performances for Excelsior and positive assessments from club head coach Ruben den Uil. Advocaat indicated that members of his staff intended to observe Bergraaf in person as part of Curaçao's wider player assessment process ahead of upcoming international competitions, including the 2026 FIFA World Cup.

On 4 November 2026, Bergraaf received his first call-up to the Curaçao national football team under head coach Dick Advocaat. The 20-year-old forward, who was on loan from Excelsior to AZ, replaced the injured Jordi Paulina. He was selected for Curaçao's CONCACAF Nations League quarter-final matches against Panama in November 2026, giving him his first opportunity to represent Curaçao at senior international level.

== Style of play ==
Bergraaf has been described by Excelsior head coach Ruben den Uil and teammates as a physically strong forward, noted for his ability to hold up the ball and create space for attacking teammates. Although he experienced difficulties converting chances during the early stages of his professional career, his link-up play and tactical understanding within the attacking unit were identified as key strengths. Den Uil compared elements of Bergraaf's playing style to that of Emmanuel Emegha, particularly in terms of physical presence and movement.

== Personal life ==
Bergraaf was born Jerolldino Armantrading and used his mother's surname during his early youth career. In April 2024, his father died, and shortly before his father's death he chose to adopt his father's surname, Bergraaf, as a tribute to him. His father's passing has been cited as a formative experience in his early professional career and personal development.

== Career statistics ==
As of match played 18 October 2026

Appearances and goals by club, season and competition
Club	Season	League			National cup		Europe		Other		Total	
Club	Season	Division	Apps	Goals	Apps	Goals	Apps	Goals	Apps	Goals	Apps	Goals
Excelsior	2024–25	Eerste Divisie	28	4	3	1	—		—		31	5
Excelsior	2025–26	Eredivisie	24	0	1	0	—		—		25	0
Excelsior	Total		52	4	4	1	—		0	0	56	5
Jong AZ (loan)	2026–27	Eerste Divisie	9	4	—		—		—		9	4
AZ (loan)	2026–27	Eredivisie	1	0	0	0	0	0	—		1	0
Career total			62	8	4	1	0	0	0	0	66	9
