= Lennard Hartjes =

Dutch footballer (born 2003)

Personal information
- Date of birth: 7 April 2003 (age 23)
- Place of birth: Spijkenisse, Netherlands
- Height: 1.70 m (5 ft 7 in)
- Position: Midfielder

Team information
- Current team: Excelsior
- Number: 20

Youth career
- 2009–2011: Spijkenisse
- 2011–2015: Sparta Rotterdam
- 2015–2021: Feyenoord

Senior career*
| Years | Team | Apps | (Gls) |
| 2021–2024 | Feyenoord | 0 | (0) |
| 2022–2023 | → Roda JC (loan) | 33 | (2) |
| 2023–2024 | → Excelsior (loan) | 1 | (0) |
| 2024– | Excelsior | 42 | (5) |

International career^{‡}
| 2021–2022 | Netherlands U19 | 8 | (0) |
- * Club domestic league appearances and goals as of 17 May 2026 ‡ National team caps and goals as of 12:47, 20 January 2025 (UTC)

Lennard Hartjes (born 7 April 2003) is a Dutch professional footballer who plays as a midfielder for Eredivisie club Excelsior.

== Club career ==
=== Feyenoord ===
Hartjes is a youth product of Spijkenisse and Sparta Rotterdam, and joined the youth academy of Feyenoord in 2015. He signed his first professional contract with the club on 18 July 2020.

Ahead of the 2021–22 season, Hartjes and fellow academy player Antoni Milambo were promoted to first team by head coach Arne Slot. He made his professional debut for Feyenoord in a 3–0 UEFA Europa Conference League win over FC Luzern on 12 August 2021, replacing Orkun Kökçü in the 58th minute.

==== Roda JC (loan) ====
On 15 August 2022, Hartjes joined Eerste Divisie club Roda JC Kerkrade on a season-long loan. He made his debut for the club as a starter in defensive midfield in a 3–0 away win in the league over FC Den Bosch after a hat-trick from former Feyenoord teammate Dylan Vente. On 18 October, Hartjes scored his first competitive goal at senior level, providing the 2–2 equaliser in a KNVB Cup match against Heracles Almelo. Despite keeping Roda's hopes of advancement alive, Hartjes would later miss the decisive penalty in the shootout, knocking the club out of the cup competition. He scored his first league goal on 30 January 2023 in a 2–1 away defeat to league leaders PEC Zwolle.

=== Excelsior ===
On 10 July 2023, Hartjes joined Eredivisie club Excelsior on a season-long loan from Feyenoord. He suffered a torn cruciate ligament during his debut in August, sidelining him for the entire campaign. Excelsior were relegated to the Eerste Divisie at the end of the 2023–24 season.

On 26 July 2024, Hartjes completed a permanent transfer to Excelsior, signing a three-year contract. He featured in every match during the first half of the 2024–25 season but sustained another cruciate ligament injury in January 2025, ruling him out for the remainder of the campaign. Despite his absence, Excelsior secured promotion back to the Eredivisie by finishing second in the league.

Hartjes returned from injury on 22 November 2025, starting in Excelsior's 2–1 away victory against Ajax in the Eredivisie. During his rehabilitation, he stated that the prolonged injury lay-off led him to briefly consider stepping away from professional football, saying that he had "thought about taking a break from the game" while recovering from the setback.

== International career ==
Hartjes was called up by Netherlands under-19 team coach Bert Konterman in August 2021. He made his international debut for the under-19s on 6 September 2021, replacing Dylan Hopman during half-time of a friendly against Italy at Sportpark Nieuw Zuid in Katwijk.

== Career statistics ==
As of match played 6 February 2026

Appearances and goals by club, season and competition
| Club | Season | League | | | KNVB Cup | | Continental | | Other | | Total | |
| Club | Season | Division | Apps | Goals | Apps | Goals | Apps | Goals | Apps | Goals | Apps | Goals |
|---|---|---|---|---|---|---|---|---|---|---|---|---|
| Feyenoord | 2021–22 | Eredivisie | 0 | 0 | 0 | 0 | 2 (Note: Appearances in UEFA Europa Conference League) | 0 | — | | 2 | 0 |
| Roda JC (loan) | 2022–23 | Eerste Divisie | 33 | 2 | 1 | 1 | — | | — | | 34 | 3 |
| Excelsior (loan) | 2023–24 | Eredivisie | 1 | 0 | 0 | 0 | — | | — | | 1 | 0 |
| Excelsior | 2024–25 | Eerste Divisie | 21 | 4 | 1 | 0 | — | | — | | 22 | 4 |
| Excelsior | 2025–26 | Eredivisie | 9 | 0 | 0 | 0 | — | | — | | 9 | 0 |
| Excelsior | Total | | 31 | 4 | 1 | 0 | — | | — | | 32 | 4 |
| Career total | | | 64 | 6 | 2 | 1 | 2 | 0 | 0 | 0 | 68 | 7 |
