= Arthur Zagré =

Burkinabe footballer (born 2001)

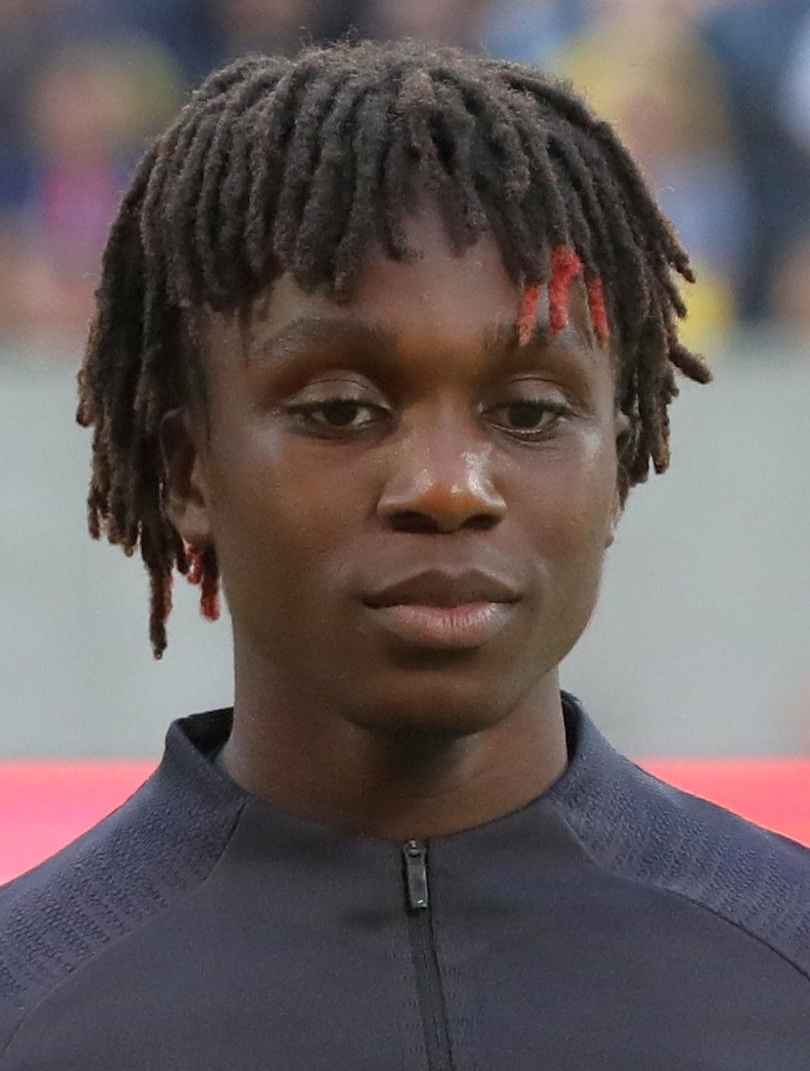
- Zagré with Paris Saint-Germain in 2019

Personal information
- Full name: Arthur Rene Adbel Aziz Zagré
- Date of birth: 4 October 2001 (age 25)
- Place of birth: Neuilly-sur-Seine, France
- Height: 1.68 m (5 ft 6 in)
- Position: Left-back

Team information
- Current team: Utrecht
- Number: 92

Youth career
- 2008–2013: Courbevoie SF
- 2013–2019: Paris Saint-Germain

Senior career*
Years	Team	Apps	(Gls)
2018–2019	Paris Saint-Germain B	27	(1)
2019	Paris Saint-Germain	1	(0)
2019–2023	Monaco	0	(0)
2019–2020	Monaco B	5	(0)
2020–2021	→ Dijon (loan)	3	(0)
2021–2023	→ Utrecht (loan)	10	(1)
2021–2023	→ Jong Utrecht (loan)	10	(1)
2023	→ Excelsior (loan)	9	(0)
2023–2026	Excelsior	89	(7)
2026–	Utrecht	9	(0)

International career^{‡}
2019	France U18	5	(0)
2018–2020	France U19	15	(2)
2026–	Burkina Faso	5	(0)
- * Club domestic league appearances and goals as of 18 October 2026 ‡ National team caps and goals as of 17 November 2026

Arthur Rene Abdel Aziz Zagré (born 4 October 2001) is a professional footballer who plays as a left-back for Eredivisie club Utrecht. Born in France, he plays for the Burkina Faso national team.

== Club career ==
=== Paris Saint-Germain ===
An academy graduate of Paris Saint-Germain, Zagré signed his first professional contract in September 2018, which tied him to the club until June 2021. In February 2019, he won the Titi d'Or, an annual award which is presented to the most promising talent in the Paris Saint-Germain Youth Academy. Zagré made his professional debut in a 4–0 Ligue 1 win over Toulouse on 25 August 2019.

=== Monaco ===
On 29 August 2019, Zagré joined Monaco on a three-year deal. The transfer fee was reportedly of 10 million euros.

==== Loan to Dijon ====
On 5 October 2020, Dijon announced the signing of Zagré on a season-long loan deal with an option to extend for another season. He made his debut in a 2–0 league loss to Marseille on 4 April 2021.

==== Loan to Utrecht ====
On 25 June 2021, Dutch club Utrecht announced the loan signing of Zagré for two seasons with option to buy.

=== Excelsior ===
On 31 January 2023, Zagré moved on a new loan to Excelsior, also in the Eredivisie. On 29 June 2023, Excelsior made the transfer permanent and signed a three-year contract with Zagré.

=== Return to Utrecht ===
On 11 July 2026, Zagré returned to Utrecht with a three-year contract.

== International career ==
Born in France, Zagré is of Burkinabé descent. He has represented France at youth level.

In May 2026, Zagré received his first call-up to the Burkina Faso national team.

== Career statistics ==
=== Club ===
As of match played 18 October 2026

Appearances and goals by club, season and competition
Club	Season	League			National Cup		League Cup		Europe		Other		Total	
Club	Season	Division	Apps	Goals	Apps	Goals	Apps	Goals	Apps	Goals	Apps	Goals	Apps	Goals
Paris Saint-Germain B	2017–18	National 2	2	0	—		—		—		—		2	0
Paris Saint-Germain B	2018–19	National 2	25	1	—		—		—		—		25	1
Paris Saint-Germain B	Total		27	1	—		—		—		—		27	1
Paris Saint-Germain	2019–20	Ligue 1	1	0	0	0	0	0	0	0	0	0	1	0
Monaco B	2019–20	National 2	3	0	—		—		—		—		3	0
Monaco B	2020–21	National 2	2	0	—		—		—		—		2	0
Monaco B	Total		5	0	—		—		—		—		5	0
Monaco	2019–20	Ligue 1	0	0	2	0	1	0	0	0	—		3	0
Dijon (loan)	2020–21	Ligue 1	3	0	0	0	—		—		—		3	0
Utrecht (loan)	2021–22	Eredivisie	8	1	2	0	—		—		1 (Note: Appearance in European play-offs)	0	11	1
Utrecht (loan)	2022–23	Eredivisie	2	0	0	0	—		—		—		2	0
Utrecht (loan)	Total		10	1	2	0	—		—		1	0	13	1
Jong Utrecht (loan)	2021–22	Eerste Divisie	6	1	—		—		—		—		6	1
Jong Utrecht (loan)	2022–23	Eerste Divisie	4	0	—		—		—		—		4	0
Jong Utrecht (loan)	Total		10	1	—		—		—		—		10	1
Excelsior (loan)	2022–23	Eredivisie	9	0	—		—		—		—		9	0
Excelsior	2023–24	Eredivisie	28	1	2	0	—		—		—		30	1
Excelsior	2024–25	Eredivisie	31	2	2	0	—		—		—		33	2
Excelsior	2025–26	Eredivisie	30	4	1	0	—		—		—		31	4
Excelsior	Total		89	7	5	0	—		—		—		94	7
Utrecht	2026–27	Eredivisie	9	0	0	0	—		—		—		9	0
Career total			163	9	9	0	1	0	0	0	1	0	174	9

=== International ===
As of match played 17 November 2026

Appearances and goals by national team and year
National team	Year	Apps	Goals
Burkina Faso	2026	5	0
Total		5	0

== Honours ==
Paris Saint-Germain

- Ligue 1: 2019–20
- Trophée des Champions: 2019
