= Nikolas Agrafiotis =

Serbian footballer (born 2000)

Personal information
- Date of birth: 25 April 2000 (age 26)
- Place of birth: 's-Hertogenbosch, Netherlands
- Height: 1.91 m (6 ft 3 in)
- Position: Forward

Team information
- Current team: St Mirren
- Number: 25

Youth career
- 2010–2014: Den Bosch
- 2014–2020: Vitesse

Senior career*
Years	Team	Apps	(Gls)
2016–2019	Jong Vitesse	14	(3)
2020–2022	Dordrecht	51	(9)
2022–2024	Excelsior	46	(7)
2024–2026	Wehen Wiesbaden	78	(14)
2026–	St Mirren	3	(1)

International career
2016	Serbia U16	4	(1)
- * Club domestic league appearances and goals as of 2 September 2026

Nikolas Agrafiotis (Serbian Cyrillic: Николас Аграфиотис; born 25 April 2000) is a professional footballer who plays as a forward for Scottish Premiership club St Mirren.

Born in the Netherlands, he has represented Serbia at youth level.

== Club career ==
=== Early years ===
Agrafiotis played in the youth departments of FC Den Bosch and Vitesse. From 2016 to 2020 he also played for the second team of the latter, Jong Vitesse. On 26 November 2016, he made his debut in the third-tier Tweede Divisie for Jong Vitesse, in the 3–0 away loss to VV Katwijk. Jong Vitesse suffered relegation to the Derde Divisie Sunday after the 2016–17 season, after which they reached promotion again a season later and returned to the Tweede Divisie.

=== Dordrecht ===
In June 2020, Agrafiotis signed as a free agent for FC Dordrecht, where he signed a contract until mid-2022. He made his professional debut on 30 August 2020, in a 0–0 home draw against Go Ahead Eagles.

=== Excelsior ===
On 31 January 2022, Agrafiotis signed a one-and-a-half-year contract with Excelsior, with an option for an additional year. He made his debut for the club on 7 February in a 4–1 league loss to FC Eindhoven, coming off the bench for Reuven Niemeijer in the 75th minute. Mostly appearing as a substitute, he would make his first start for the team on 29 April in a league draw against VVV-Venlo, also providing an assist to the late equaliser by Marouan Azarkan.

Agrafiotis would prove decisive in the playoffs for promotion after Excelsior qualified by finishing sixth in the league table. He scored his first goal for the club late in extra time of the first round second leg against Roda JC Kerkrade to secure a 4–2 win on aggregate. He scored again on 21 May in a 3–1 win over Heracles Almelo, as they suffered relegation from the Eredivisie for the first time in two decades, and Excelsior advanced to the playoff final. Excelsior would eventually win promotion to the Eredivisie after a penalty shoot-out against ADO Den Haag.

=== Wehen Wiesbaden ===
On 31 January 2024, Agrafiotis signed with Wehen Wiesbaden in German 2. Bundesliga.

=== St Mirren ===
On 30 August 2026, Agrafiotis signed with St Mirren. He scored his first goal for the club from the penalty spot in a home league match against Celtic, which St Mirren lost 2–1.

== International career ==
Agrafiotis was born in the Netherlands to a Greek father and a Serbian mother. He is a youth international for Serbia.

== Career statistics ==
As of match played 5 October 2024

Appearances and goals by club, season and competition
Club	Season	League			Cup		Continental		Other		Total	
Club	Season	Division	Apps	Goals	Apps	Goals	Apps	Goals	Apps	Goals	Apps	Goals
Jong Vitesse	2016–17	Tweede Divisie	5	1	—		—		—		5	1
Jong Vitesse	2017–18	Derde Divisie	0	0	—		—		—		0	0
Jong Vitesse	2018–19	Tweede Divisie	9	2	—		—		—		9	2
Jong Vitesse	Total		14	3	—		—		—		14	3
Dordrecht	2020–21	Eerste Divisie	29	3	1	2	—		—		30	5
Dordrecht	2021–22	Eerste Divisie	22	6	1	0	—		—		23	6
Dordrecht	Total		51	9	2	2	—		—		53	11
Excelsior	2021–22	Eerste Divisie	11	0	0	0	—		3 (Note: Appearances in Eredivisie promotion/relegation playoffs)	2	14	2
Excelsior	2022–23	Eredivisie	17	2	2	0	—		—		19	2
Excelsior	2023–24	Eredivisie	18	5	3	1	—		—		21	6
Excelsior	Total		46	7	5	1	—		3	2	54	8
Wehen Wiesbaden	2023–24	2. Bundesliga	12	1	0	0	—		2	0	14	1
Wehen Wiesbaden	2024–25	3. Liga	5	0	0	0	—		—		5	0
Wehen Wiesbaden	Total		17	1	0	0	—		2	0	19	1
Career total			128	20	7	3	—		5	2	140	25

== Honours ==
Individual

- Eredivisie Team of the Month: August 2023,
