= Lance Duijvestijn =

Dutch footballer (born 1999)

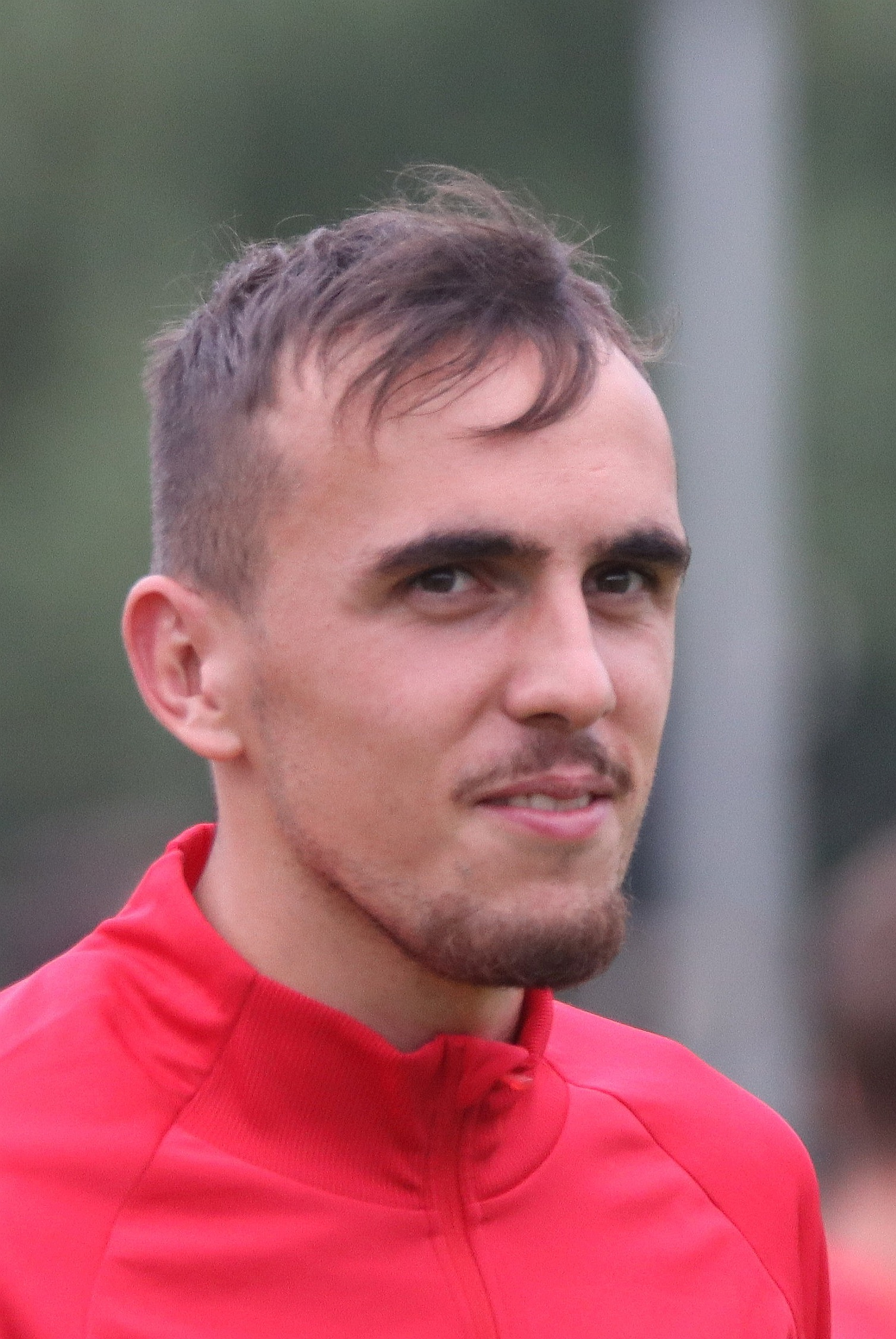
- Duijvestijn in 2021

Personal information
- Date of birth: 15 January 1999 (age 27)
- Place of birth: Wateringen, Netherlands
- Height: 1.79 m (5 ft 10 in)
- Position: Midfielder

Team information
- Current team: Darmstadt 98
- Number: 41

Youth career
- –2009: SV VELO
- 2009–2018: ADO Den Haag

Senior career*
| Years | Team | Apps | (Gls) |
| 2018–2019 | NEC | 1 | (0) |
| 2019–2020 | Jong ADO | 21 | (11) |
| 2020–2021 | Helmond Sport | 37 | (11) |
| 2021–2024 | Almere City | 83 | (20) |
| 2024–2025 | Excelsior | 37 | (15) |
| 2025–2026 | Sparta Rotterdam | 13 | (0) |
| 2026 | → Fortuna Sittard (loan) | 15 | (3) |
| 2026– | Darmstadt 98 | 9 | (0) |

International career
| 2013–2014 | Netherlands U15 | 2 | (0) |
- * Club domestic league appearances and goals as of 09:26, 30 October 2026 (UTC)

Lance Duijvestijn (born 15 January 1999) is a Dutch professional footballer who plays as a midfielder for 2. Bundesliga club Darmstadt 98.

== Career ==
=== Early years ===
Born in Wateringen, Duijvestijn began his youth career at SV VELO before moving to the ADO Den Haag academy. After failing to break into the first team, he moved to NEC, where he made his Eerste Divisie debut for on 17 August 2018 in a match against Cambuur, as a 77th-minute substitute for Sven Braken.

In 2019, he returned to his former club ADO Den Haag where he played for the reserve team, Jong ADO, in the fourth-tier Derde Divisie. There, he established himself as a prolific scorer for midfield, among others scoring four goals in a 4–2 win over Gemert. After Alan Pardew took over as new head coach of the ADO first team, Duijvestijn saw his chances of breaking into the first team diminish. After a trial with Quick Boys in May 2020, he eventually moved to Helmond Sport on 30 July 2020 on a one-year deal with the option of one more year.

=== Almere City ===
On 29 June 2021, Duijvestijn signed a three-year contract with Almere City. He made his debut on 9 August in a 2–1 loss to Jong AZ, playing the entire game. Less than two weeks later, in his third game for the club, Duijvestijn scored his first goal in the third minute, but saw his team lose 2–1 to VVV-Venlo.

Duijvestijn played a key role in Almere City's promotion to the Eredivisie during the 2022–23 season, marking the club's first-ever appearance in the top tier of Dutch football. He scored eight goals in 32 league appearances and netted three goals in six play-off matches. Notably, Duijvestijn scored a crucial brace in the first leg of the play-off final against Emmen, significantly contributing to the club's historic promotion to the Eredivisie.

=== Excelsior ===
On 1 February 2024, Duijvestijn joined Excelsior from Almere City, signing a two-and-a-half-year contract with the Eredivisie club. He made his debut on 10 February, coming on at half-time for Redouan El Yaakoubi in a 3–0 home defeat to Twente. Duijvestijn went on to score four goals in fourteen Eredivisie appearances in the remainder of the 2023–24 campaign, and also found the net in the promotion/relegation play-offs, including the first leg of the final against NAC Breda in which he scored before being sent off in a 6–2 defeat. Excelsior were ultimately relegated after losing the two-legged final 7–6 on aggregate, despite winning the return 4–1.

Duijvestijn stayed with Excelsior following relegation and was made captain for the 2024–25 season in the Eerste Divisie. He missed several months after ankle surgery but returned to play a central role in the club's push for immediate promotion. He finished the league season with eleven goals and nine assists in 23 appearances, as Excelsior secured promotion back to the Eredivisie after one year. In May 2025, he was named Eerste Divisie Player of the Season and received the competition's Gouden Schild award from Netherlands head coach Ronald Koeman.

=== Sparta Rotterdam ===
On 23 June 2025, Duijvestijn signed a four-year contract with Eredivisie club Sparta Rotterdam. An injury sustained in pre-season delayed his competitive debut until 14 September 2025, when he came on as a substitute in the 74th minute of a 1–0 away win at Excelsior—his former club—which Sparta won through a stoppage-time goal. Duijvestijn described making his debut against Excelsior as "naturally special", having spent a year and a half there. He subsequently lost his place in the starting eleven during the final weeks of 2025, finishing the first half of the season with 13 Eredivisie appearances and no goal contributions in the league; his only goal and assist came in the KNVB Cup.

On 16 January 2026, Duijvestijn joined Fortuna Sittard on loan for the remainder of the season. He made his debut the following day, starting in a 2–1 home defeat to PSV. He scored his first goal for the club on 8 February 2026, netting just before half-time against his parent club Sparta Rotterdam in a match that ended 2–2—having failed to score in 13 Eredivisie appearances for Sparta, he converted from around ten metres to give Fortuna the lead.

=== Darmstadt 98 ===
On 30 June 2026, Duijvestijn signed for German 2. Bundesliga club Darmstadt 98.

== Career statistics ==
As of match played 27 October 2026

Appearances and goals by club, season and competition
| Club | Season | League | | | National cup | | Other | | Total | |
| Club | Season | Division | Apps | Goals | Apps | Goals | Apps | Goals | Apps | Goals |
|---|---|---|---|---|---|---|---|---|---|---|
| NEC | 2018–19 | Eerste Divisie | 1 | 0 | — | | — | | 1 | 0 |
| Jong ADO | 2019–20 | Derde Divisie | 21 | 11 | — | | — | | 21 | 11 |
| Helmond Sport | 2020–21 | Eerste Divisie | 37 | 11 | 1 | 0 | — | | 38 | 11 |
| Almere City | 2021–22 | Eerste Divisie | 37 | 12 | 1 | 0 | — | | 38 | 12 |
| Almere City | 2022–23 | Eerste Divisie | 32 | 8 | 1 | 1 | 6 (Note: Appearances in promotion play-offs) | 3 | 39 | 12 |
| Almere City | 2023–24 | Eredivisie | 14 | 0 | 2 | 1 | — | | 16 | 1 |
| Almere City | Total | | 83 | 20 | 4 | 2 | 6 | 3 | 93 | 25 |
| Excelsior | 2023–24 | Eredivisie | 14 | 4 | — | | 3 (Note: Appearances in relegation play-offs) | 2 | 17 | 6 |
| Excelsior | 2024–25 | Eredivisie | 23 | 11 | 2 | 2 | — | | 25 | 13 |
| Excelsior | Total | | 37 | 15 | 2 | 2 | 3 | 2 | 42 | 19 |
| Sparta Rotterdam | 2025–26 | Eredivisie | 13 | 0 | 2 | 1 | — | | 15 | 1 |
| Fortuna Sittard (loan) | 2025–26 | Eredivisie | 12 | 2 | 0 | 0 | — | | 12 | 2 |
| Darmstadt 98 | 2026–27 | 2. Bundesliga | 9 | 0 | 2 | 1 | — | | 11 | 1 |
| Career total | | | 213 | 59 | 11 | 6 | 9 | 5 | 233 | 70 |

== Honours ==
Individual

- Eerste Divisie Player of the Season: 2024–25
- Excelsior Player of the Season: 2024–25
