= Zach Booth =

American soccer player (born 2004)

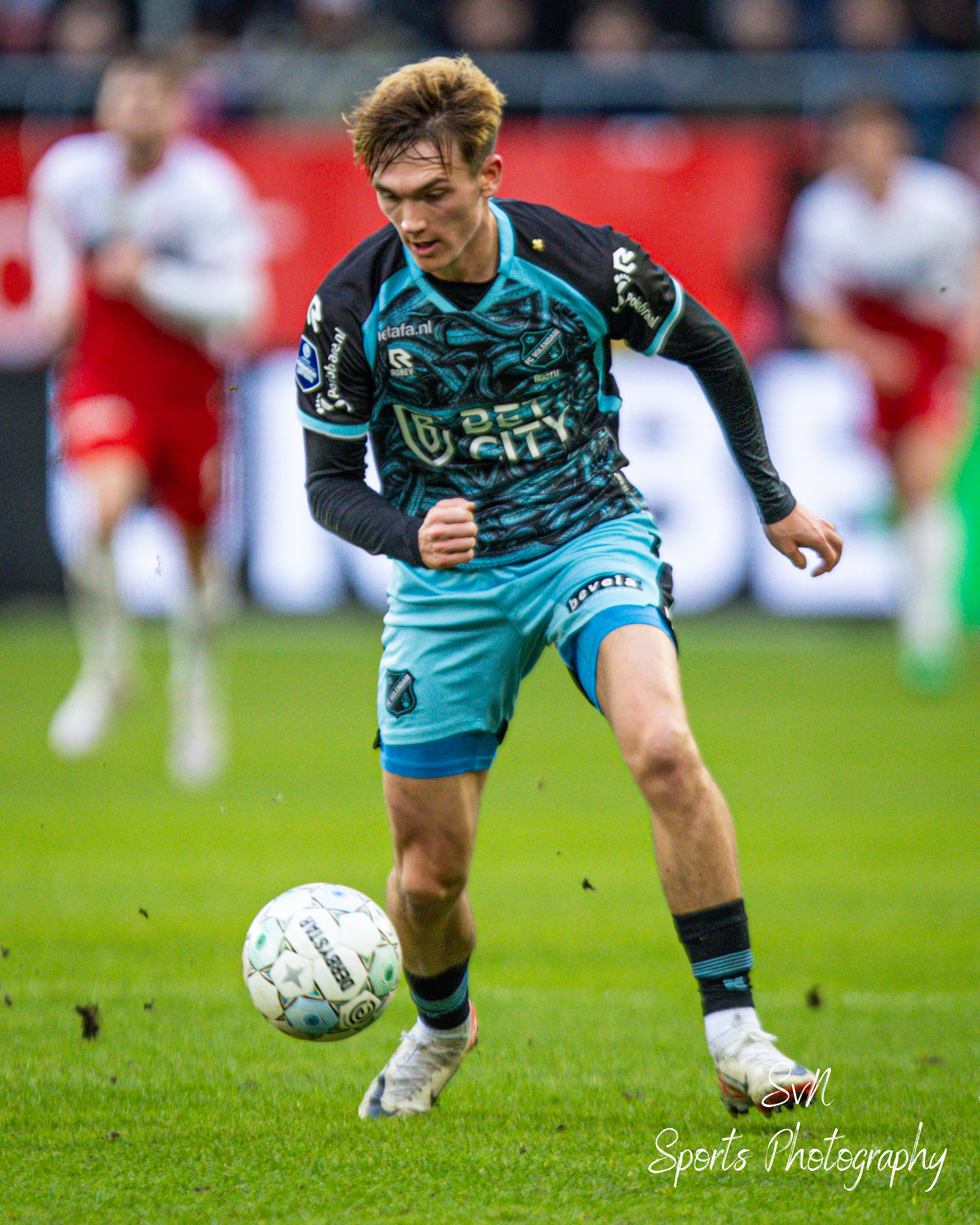
- Booth with Volendam in 2024

Personal information
- Full name: Chadwick Zachary Booth
- Date of birth: February 17, 2004 (age 22)
- Place of birth: Eden, Utah, United States
- Height: 1.84 m (6 ft 0 in)
- Position: Midfielder

Team information
- Current team: Real Salt Lake (on loan from Excelsior)
- Number: 23

Youth career
- –2020: Real Salt Lake
- 2020–2023: Leicester City

Senior career*
Years	Team	Apps	(Gls)
2023–2024	Leicester City	0	(0)
2023–2024	→ Volendam (loan)	27	(2)
2024–	Excelsior	22	(0)
2026–	→ Real Salt Lake (loan)	11	(1)
2026–	→ Real Monarchs (loan)	2	(0)

International career
2020	United States U17	3	(0)
2022–2023	United States U19	2	(0)
- * Club domestic league appearances and goals as of August 15, 2026

Chadwick Zachary Booth (born February 17, 2004) is an American professional soccer player who plays as a midfielder for Major League Soccer side Real Salt Lake, on loan from Eredivisie side Excelsior.

== Club career ==
Booth spent two years with the academy of Real Salt Lake. He then moved to the academy of Leicester City in September 2020.

On September 1, 2023, Booth joined Eredivisie club Volendam on a season-long loan. He made his professional debut with Volendam on September 23, coming on as a substitute in the 72nd minute of a 2–2 draw with Heracles Almelo. He scored his first goal for the club on February 4, 2024, in a 4–2 loss against FC Utrecht, a game where his brother Taylor scored a hat-trick in.

On August 28, 2024, Booth returned to the Netherlands and signed a three-season contract with Excelsior.

On December 28, 2025, Booth joined MLS club Real Salt Lake on loan.

== International career ==
Booth has represented the United States at a number of youth levels, from under-15 to under-20.

== Personal life ==
His older brother, Taylor, plays for Eredivisie club Utrecht and the United States national team.

== Career statistics ==
=== Club ===
As of match played December 17, 2024

Appearances and goals by club, season and competition
Club	Season	League			National cup		Other		Total	
Club	Season	Division	Apps	Goals	Apps	Goals	Apps	Goals	Apps	Goals
Leicester City U21	2022–23	—			—		1 (Note: Appearance in EFL Trophy)	0	1	0
Volendam (loan)	2023–24	Eredivisie	27	2	1	0	—		28	2
Excelsior	2024–25	Eerste Divisie	9	0	1	2	—		10	2
Career total			36	2	2	2	1	0	39	4
