= 2016–17 Panionios F.C. season =

Panionios
2016–17 season
- Owner: Nikos Zamanis (33.5%); Christos Daras (33.5%)
- Chairman: Christos Daras
- Head Coach: Vladan Milojević
- Stadium: Nea Smyrni Stadium; Athens, Greece
- Super League Greece: 5th
- Greek Cup: Group stage
- Top goalscorer: Ben (9 goals)
Home colours	Away colours	Third colours

In the 2016–17 season Panionios competed in the Super League and the Greek Cup.

== Players ==
Note: Flags indicate national team as defined under FIFA eligibility rules; some limited exceptions apply. Players may hold more than one non-FIFA nationality.

No.	Pos.	Nation	Player
2	DF	GRE	Vasileios Pliatsikas
3	DF	GRE	Christos Tasoulis
4	DF	GRE	Vasilis Patsatzoglou
5	DF	CYP	Stefanos Mouktaris
6	DF	GRE	Vangelis Ikonomou (Vice-captain)
7	MF	GRE	Panagiotis Korbos (Captain)
8	MF	GRE	Panagiotis Ballas
9	MF	GRE	Taxiarchis Fountas
11	MF	GRE	Lazaros Lamprou
13	DF	CMR	Jérôme Guihoata
14	DF	GRE	Dimitris Stavropoulos
15	DF	CYP	Marios Antoniades
19	FW	GRE	Georgios Masouras
21	MF	GRE	Manolis Siopis
22	GK	GRE	Andreas Gianniotis (On loan from Olympiacos)

No.	Pos.	Nation	Player
23	FW	GRE	Gerasimos Voukelatos
24	FW	FRA	David Ngog
30	GK	GRE	Lefteris Astras
31	FW	COM	Ben Nabouhane (On loan from Olympiacos)
33	GK	GRE	Panagiotis Vosniadis
37	DF	GRE	Valentinos Vlachos
44	DF	GRE	Spyros Risvanis
52	FW	BIH	Aidin Mahmutović
64	MF	GRE	Nikos Katharios
69	FW	GER	Samed Yeşil
72	MF	FRA	Kevin Tapoko
73	GK	GRE	Georgios Bantis
77	MF	IRI	Masoud Shojaei
88	MF	GRE	Kyriakos Savvidis

== Competitions ==
=== Super League ===
==== League table ====
Pos	Team	Pld	W	D	L	GF	GA	GD	Pts	Qualification or relegation
3	Panathinaikos	30	16	9	5	45	19	+26	57	Qualification for the Play-offs
4	AEK Athens	30	14	11	5	54	23	+31	53	Qualification for the Play-offs
5	Panionios	30	15	7	8	35	23	+12	52	Qualification for the Play-offs
6	Xanthi	30	13	9	8	34	25	+9	48	
7	Platanias	30	11	9	10	34	38	−4	42	

Source: Super League Greece
Rules for classification: 1) Points; 2) Head-to-head points; 3) Head-to-head goal difference; 4) Goals scored; 5) Goals against; 6) Play-offs (neutral ground); 7) Draw.
(Note: Criteria 6 is only used if needed to decide champion, teams for relegation or teams for UEFA competitions).

==== Results summary ====
Overall								Home						Away					
Pld	W	D	L	GF	GA	GD	Pts	W	D	L	GF	GA	GD	W	D	L	GF	GA	GD
30	15	7	8	35	23	+12	52	8	4	3	19	12	+7	7	3	5	16	11	+5

Last updated: 31 May 2017.

==== Results by matchday ====
Matchday	1	2	3	4	5	6	7	8	9	10	11	12	13	14	15	16	17	18	19	20	21	22	23	24	25	26	27	28	29	30
Ground	H	A	H	A	H	A	A	H	H	A	H	A	H	A	A	A	H	A	H	A	H	A	H	H	A	H	A	H	A	H
Result	W	W	L	W	L	D	L	W	D	D	W	W	D	W	W	L	W	D	W	W	W	W	D	W	L	W	L	D	L	L
Position	4	4	5	3	4	5	6	4	5	7	5	4	4	2	2	4	2	2	2	2	2	2	2	2	2	2	4	3	5	5

A = Away; H = Home; W = Win; D = Draw; L = Loss

==== Play-offs table ====
Pos	Team	Pld	W	D	L	GF	GA	GD	Pts	Qualification
2	AEK Athens	6	4	0	2	5	3	+2	12	Qualification for the Champions League third qualifying round
3	Panathinaikos (Note: Panathinaikos were deducted 3 points due to fan behavior against PAOK.)	6	3	1	2	6	7	−1	8	Qualification for the Europa League third qualifying round (Note: PAOK qualified for the Europa League third qualifying round by winning the Greek Cup.)
4	PAOK (Note: PAOK were deducted 6 points due to fan behavior against AEK Athens in Greek Cup final.)	6	3	0	3	7	5	+2	5	Qualification for the Europa League third qualifying round
5	Panionios	6	1	1	4	3	6	−3	4	Qualification for the Europa League second qualifying round

Source: Super League Greece: Standings, Schedule
Rules for classification: 1) Points; 2) Head-to-head points; 3) Head-to-head goal difference; 4) Goals scored; 5) Goals against; 6) Regular season position.

=== Matches ===
10 September 2016 Match 1	Panionios	3 - 0	Asteras Tripolis	Athens
18:15	Fountas 24' 57'; Ansarifard 51'; Antoniades (yellow card) 60'; Risvanis (yellow card) 88'	Report	Tsilianidis (yellow card) 26'; Bertos (yellow card) 36'	Stadium: Nea Smyrni Stadium; Attendance: 1,295; Referee: Anastasios Papapetrou

17 September 2016 Match 2	Xanthi	0 - 2	Panionios	Xanthi
15:00	Papageorgiou (yellow card) 54'; Dani Nieto (yellow card) 82'	Report	Shojaei 5' (yellow card) 82'; Risvanis 16' (yellow card) 75'; Korbos (yellow card) 52'	Stadium: Xanthi FC Arena; Attendance: 878; Referee: Dimitrios Karantonis
