= Julian Baas =

Dutch footballer (born 2002)

Personal information
- Date of birth: 16 April 2002 (age 24)
- Place of birth: Dordrecht, Netherlands
- Height: 1.84 m (6 ft 0 in)
- Position: Midfielder

Team information
- Current team: Sparta
- Number: 6

Youth career
- –2015: Oranje Wit
- 2015–2017: Dordrecht
- 2017–2018: Oranje Wit
- 2018–2020: Excelsior

Senior career*
Years	Team	Apps	(Gls)
2020–2024	Excelsior	134	(10)
2024–	Sparta	42	(0)
2025	→ Eintracht Braunschweig (loan)	14	(1)

International career^{‡}
2024	Netherlands U21	1	(0)
- * Club domestic league appearances and goals as of 19 September 2026 ‡ National team caps and goals as of 23:34, 21 March 2024 (UTC)

Julian Baas (born 16 April 2002) is a Dutch professional footballer who plays as a midfielder for Eredivisie club Sparta Rotterdam.

== Career ==
Baas made his professional debut in the Eerste Divisie appearing as a substitute as Excelsior played Jong PSV away on 29 August 2020 winning 6–1.

Appearing as a substitute in the promotion play-off against ADO Den Haag on 29 May 2022, Baas provided the assist in extra time with his club 4–3 down for Redouan El Yaakoubi to head in an equaliser and send the match to penalties. Baas took the second spot off kick for his side and scored his penalty as Excelsior triumphed on the day. Following their promotion from the Eerste Divisie at the end of the 2021–22 season, he made his Eredivisie debut for Excelsior on 12 August 2022 against SC Cambuur at the Cambuur Stadion in a 2–0 victory.

On 25 June 2024, Baas moved to Sparta Rotterdam on a three-year contract. On 29 January 2025, Baas joined Eintracht Braunschweig in Germany on loan with an option to buy.

== Career statistics ==
As of match played 28 October 2026

Appearances and goals by club, season and competition
Club	Season	League			Cup		Other		Total	
Club	Season	Division	Apps	Goals	Apps	Goals	Apps	Goals	Apps	Goals
Excelsior	2020–21	Eerste Divisie	31	3	3	0	—		34	3
Excelsior	2021–22	Eerste Divisie	37	2	2	1	6 (Note: Appearances in Eredivisie promotion/relegation playoffs)	0	45	3
Excelsior	2022–23	Eredivisie	33	3	2	0	—		35	3
Excelsior	2023–24	Eredivisie	33	2	3	1	—		36	3
Excelsior	Total		134	10	10	2	6	0	150	12
Sparta Rotterdam	2024–25	Eredivisie	13	0	2	0	0	0	15	0
Sparta Rotterdam	2025–26	Eredivisie	23	0	2	0	—		25	0
Sparta Rotterdam	2026–27	Eredivisie	6	0	1	0	—		7	0
Sparta Rotterdam	Total		42	0	5	0	0	0	47	0
Career total			176	10	15	2	6	0	197	12
