= Lazaros Lamprou =

Greek footballer (born 1997)

Personal information
- Date of birth: 19 December 1997 (age 28)
- Place of birth: Katerini, Greece
- Height: 1.83 m (6 ft 0 in)
- Position: Winger

Team information
- Current team: Volos
- Number: 7

Youth career
- –2011: Pontioi Katerini
- 2011–2016: Panathinaikos

Senior career*
Years	Team	Apps	(Gls)
2015–2016	Panathinaikos	0	(0)
2016–2017	Iraklis	10	(1)
2017–2022	PAOK	19	(2)
2017–2018	→ Panionios (loan)	36	(5)
2018–2019	→ Fortuna Sittard (loan)	24	(7)
2020–2021	→ Twente (loan)	7	(0)
2021–2022	→ OFI (loan)	29	(5)
2022–2024	Excelsior	56	(10)
2024–2025	Raków Częstochowa	8	(0)
2025	→ Volos (loan)	19	(4)
2025–	Volos	35	(7)

International career
2013–2014	Greece U16	2	(0)
2013–2015	Greece U17	10	(1)
2015	Greece U18	5	(1)
2015–2016	Greece U19	12	(3)
2016–2018	Greece U21	12	(1)
- * Club domestic league appearances and goals as of 20 September 2026

Lazaros Lamprou (Greek: Λάζαρος Λάμπρου; born 19 December 1997) is a Greek professional footballer who plays as a winger for Super League club Volos.

== Career ==
=== Panathinaikos ===
On 13 March 2014, three years after he joined the U17 team, Lamprou, along with nine other players, signed his first professional contract with Panathinaikos. In 2014, was the only Greek player to feature on a list entitled “TOP 40 young talent in world football – born in 1997″ by The Guardian.

On 28 October 2015, he made his first team debut, in a 3–0 home defeat against Levadiakos for the Greek Cup.

=== Iraklis ===
On 5 September 2016, After having refused to sign a new contract with Panathinaikos, Lamprou agreed to sign a two-year contract with Iraklis. His first appearance and his first goal in Iraklis' shirt came in a Super League Greece match against AEL, on 12 September 2016.

=== PAOK ===
On 29 December 2016, PAOK announced the signing of Lamprou from Iraklis for a 3.5-year contract on an amount of €300,000 and that he would play for Panionios on loan for the rest of the season. On 20 July 2017, on the second leg of the second qualifying round of Europa League, he scored his first goal with Panionios giving a two goal lead against Gorica in a glorious 3–2 away win. On 7 February 2018, Lamprou as a substitute, scored with a brilliant deft lob in the final stages, securing Panionios’ 5–1 aggregate win over Lamia and qualification for the Greek Cup semi-final stage. It was the first time since 2000 that the club reached the semi-finals. Three days later, he scored again with a penalty kick sealing a 1–0 home win against Lamia for the Super League.

On 31 August 2018, Lamprou joined Eredivisie club Fortuna Sittard on loan until the summer of 2019. On 21 October 2018, he scored a brace sealing a 3–1 home win game against De Graafschap and was voted as the MVP of the game. On 9 February 2019, he gave the lead to his club in a home game against Excelsior, and scored another 20 minutes later sealing a 4–1 home win. On 23 February 2019, he opened the score after an assist from Calvin Mac-Intosch in a 2–4 home loss against rivals Heerenveen. On 3 March 2019, he equalized after an assist from Michael Pinto in a 4–2 away loss against AZ. Having earned the trust of Sittard head coach Rene Eijer, Lamprou started most matches in the Eredivisie and stood out as the team's main attacking threat. The 21-year-old has experienced a great season in the Netherlands with 24 appearances across all competitions and eight goals to his name, and consequently Lamprou is being heavily sought out by clubs from Portugal, Belgium, and the Netherlands, where he established himself this season.

On summer 2019, he returned to PAOK. On 23 December 2019, he made his debut for the 2018–19 season as a substitute in a 5–1 home win game against Atromitos. On 15 January 2020, he scored his first goal in the season, opening the scoring, powering into the penalty area from the right flank and lashing a fierce attempt into the roof of the net to give the lead to his club in a 4–1 home Greek Cup win game against OFI. On 19 January 2020, he scored his first goal in the Championship as the young Greek forward tapping in from close range following a slick passing move and yet another great assist from Josip Mišić, in a 3–1 home win game against Asteras Tripolis.

On 31 July 2020, Lamprou joined Eredivisie club Twente on loan from PAOK, with a purchase option for the summer of 2021. On 30 December 2020, his loan was cut short.

On 31 August 2021, he joined OFI on a season-long loan. On 28 November 2021, he scored his first goal of the season, with a penalty kick in the last minute of the game, sealing a vital 2–1 home win game against Ionikos F.C. On 12 January 2022, he scored a brace helping his team seal an emphatic 3–0 win away win over Apollon Smyrnis He was voted man of the match for his performance.

=== Excelsior ===
On 31 August 2022, Lamprou signed a two-year contract with Excelsior in the Netherlands.

=== Raków Częstochowa ===
On 9 July 2024, Polish Ekstraklasa club Raków Częstochowa announced the signing of Lamprou on a free transfer. He signed a three-year deal, with an option for another twelve months.

=== Volos ===
On 27 December 2024, Lamprou returned to Greece to join Volos on a six-month loan. In June 2025, Volos confirmed the signing of Lamprou on a permanent basis.

== Career statistics ==
As of match played 12 May 2026

Appearances and goals by club, season and competition
Club	Season	League			National cup (Note: Includes Greek Cup, KNVB Cup)		Continental		Total	
Club	Season	Division	Apps	Goals	Apps	Goals	Apps	Goals	Apps	Goals
Panathinaikos	2015–16	Super League Greece	0	0	2	0	—		2	0
Iraklis	2016–17	Super League Greece	10	1	3	0	—		13	1
Panionios (loan)	2016–17	Super League Greece	14	0	—		—		14	0
Panionios (loan)	2017–18	Super League Greece	22	5	5	2	4 (Note: Appearances in UEFA Europa League)	1	31	8
Panionios (loan)	Total		36	5	5	2	4	1	45	8
Fortuna Sittard (loan)	2018–19	Eredivisie	24	7	3	1	—		27	8
PAOK	2019–20	Super League Greece	10	2	5	1	0	0	15	3
PAOK	2020–21	Super League Greece	9	0	3	0	0	0	12	0
PAOK	Total		19	2	8	1	0	0	27	3
Twente (loan)	2020–21	Eredivisie	7	0	1	0	—		8	0
OFI (loan)	2021–22	Super League Greece	29	5	2	0	—		31	5
Excelsior	2022–23	Eredivisie	28	4	2	2	—		30	6
Excelsior	2023–24	Eredivisie	28	6	3	1	4 (Note: Appearances in Eredivisie promotion/relegation play-offs)	1	35	8
Excelsior	Total		56	10	5	3	4	1	65	14
Raków Częstochowa	2024–25	Ekstraklasa	8	0	0	0	—		8	0
Volos (loan)	2024–25	Super League Greece	19	4	—		—		19	4
Volos	2025–26	Super League Greece	30	7	1	0	—		31	7
Career total			238	41	30	7	8	2	276	50

== Honours ==
PAOK

- Greek Cup: 2020–21

Individual

- Eredivisie Talent of the Month: February 2019
