= Casper Widell =

Swedish footballer (born 2003)

- Widell with Sweden U21 in 2023

Personal information
- Date of birth: 5 May 2003 (age 23)
- Place of birth: Landskrona, Sweden
- Position: Defender

Team information
- Current team: Excelsior
- Number: 4

Youth career
- –2016: IK Wormo
- 2016–2020: Helsingborgs IF

Senior career*
Years	Team	Apps	(Gls)
2020–2023	Helsingborgs IF	54	(0)
2023–	Excelsior	99	(6)

International career^{‡}
2018–2020	Sweden U17	16	(0)
2021–2023	Sweden U19	10	(0)
2022–2024	Sweden U21	12	(1)
- * Club domestic league appearances and goals as of 17 May 2026 ‡ National team caps and goals as of 20:22, 15 October 2024 (UTC)

Casper Ludvig Widell (born 5 May 2003) is a Swedish professional footballer who plays as a centre-back for Eredivisie club Excelsior.

== Club career ==
Born in Landskrona, in the Swedish province of Scania, Widell started playing football as a child in the local club IK Wormo, together with his brother Melker (who later joined the youth sector of Malmö FF). Originally a striker in his childhood, he was later moved down to the midfield.

In 2016, he was noticed by Helsingborgs IF scouts and later joined the club's academy, where he was told to adjust his playing position once more, thus becoming a centre-back. After featuring in the 2018 edition of the Gothia Cup with his team, Widell quickly rose through the youth ranks of Helsingborg’s academy: while being a regular for the U17 side, in 2019 he was selected for the U19 squad despite his younger age.

At the start of 2020, following his impressive performances at academy level and injuries occurred to several members of the senior squad, Widell was invited by head coach Olof Mellberg to join training sessions with the first team, ending up featuring in the second half of a pre-season friendly against Danish side Lyngby BK. As the regular season of the Allsvenskan started, Mellberg decided to give Widell a spot in the first team, and the young centre-back made his professional debut on June 15, 2020 in the first game of the season, against Varbergs BoIS: he played the entirety of the match as his club eventually suffered a 0-3 home loss. During the season, he featured for Helsingborg six more times, two of which as a starter. However, he was involved in his club's relegation at the end of the year, as they finished second to last in the league table.

Nevertheless, after some speculation during the previous year, on February 10, 2021 Helsingborg officially announced that they had agreed with Widell to extend his contract until 2023.

== International career ==
A youth international for Sweden, Widell played for and captained the under-16 and under-17 national team.

== Personal life ==
He has an older brother, named Melker (born 19 April 2002), who is also a footballer and currently plays for Swansea City in the EFL Championship.

Their father Mikael played as a goalkeeper in the minor leagues of Swedish football.

During his time at Helsingborg, Widell has indicated his coach Olof Mellberg and the team's captain, Andreas Granqvist, as his main mentors: they both were centre-backs themselves, as well as full internationals for the Sweden national team.

== Career statistics ==
=== Club ===
As of 22 February 2021.

Club	Season	League			Cup		Continental		Other		Total	
Club	Season	Division	Apps	Goals	Apps	Goals	Apps	Goals	Apps	Goals	Apps	Goals
Helsingborgs IF	2020	Allsvenskan	7	0	0	0	–		0	0	7	0
Helsingborgs IF	2021	Superettan	0	0	0	0	–		0	0	0	0
Career total			7	0	0	0	0	0	0	0	7	0
