= Mimeirhel Benita =

Dutch footballer (born 2003)

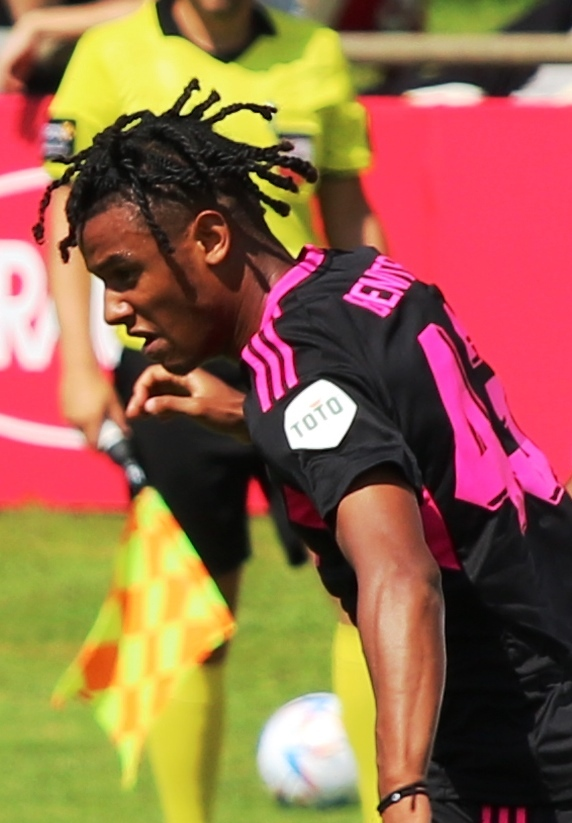
- Benita playing for Feyenoord in 2022

Personal information
- Full name: Mimeirhel Obispo Benita
- Date of birth: 17 November 2003 (age 22)
- Place of birth: Spijkenisse, Netherlands
- Height: 1.73 m (5 ft 8 in)
- Positions: Right-back; winger

Team information
- Current team: Heracles
- Number: 2

Youth career
- VV Rozenburg
- –2016: Nieuwenhoorn
- 2016–2021: Feyenoord

Senior career*
Years	Team	Apps	(Gls)
2021–2025	Feyenoord	2	(0)
2023–2024	→ Excelsior (loan)	20	(0)
2024–2025	→ Heracles (loan)	29	(0)
2025–	Heracles	25	(0)

International career^{‡}
2019	Netherlands U16	3	(0)
2021–2022	Netherlands U19	8	(0)
- * Club domestic league appearances and goals as of 21 May 2026 ‡ National team caps and goals as of 7 June 2022

Mimeirhel Obispo Benita (born 17 November 2003) is a Dutch professional footballer who plays for Eerste Divisie club Heracles Almelo.

== Club career ==
Mimeirhel Benita made his professional debut for Feyenoord on 26 August 2021, coming out of the bench for the last few minutes of 3–1 away loss to Elfsborg, the last match of a successful Conference League qualification campaign. He became an official member of the club's first team squad in August 2022.

On 25 July 2023, Benita joined Eredivisie side Excelsior Rotterdam on loan for the remainder of the season.

On 20 June 2024, Benita joined Eredivisie club Heracles Almelo loan for the 2024–25 season. One year later, Benita permanently moved to Heracles Almelo on a three-year contract.

== International career ==
Born in the continental Netherlands, Dijkstra is of Curaçaoan descent. He is a youth international for the Netherlands.

== Career statistics ==
As of match played 11 January 2025

Appearances and goals by club, season and competition
Club	Season	League			Cup		Europe		Other		Total	
Club	Season	Division	Apps	Goals	Apps	Goals	Apps	Goals	Apps	Goals	Apps	Goals
Feyenoord	2021–22	Eredivisie	0	0	0	0	3 (Note: Appearances in UEFA Europa Conference League)	0	—		3	0
Feyenoord	2022–23	Eredivisie	2	0	1	0	0	0	—		3	0
Feyenoord	Total		2	0	1	0	3	0	0	0	6	0
Excelsior (loan)	2023–24	Eredivisie	20	0	3	0	0	0	—		23	0
Heracles Almelo (loan)	2024–25	Eredivisie	17	0	2	0	0	0	—		19	0
Career total			39	0	6	0	3	0	0	0	48	0

== Honours ==
Feyenoord

- Eredivisie: 2022–23
