= Oscar Uddenäs =

Swedish footballer (born 2002)

Personal information
- Full name: Fredrik Oscar Olle Uddenäs
- Date of birth: 17 August 2002 (age 24)
- Place of birth: Lomma, Sweden
- Height: 1.86 m (6 ft 1 in)
- Position: Winger

Team information
- Current team: Östers IF
- Number: 10

Youth career
- –2010: GIF Nike
- 2010–2019: Malmö FF
- 2019–2020: S.P.A.L.

Senior career*
Years	Team	Apps	(Gls)
2020–2022	Värnamo	27	(7)
2022–2023	Häcken	38	(8)
2023–2025	Excelsior	25	(3)
2024–2025	→ AIK (loan)	3	(0)
2025-	Östers IF	45	(8)

International career^{‡}
2018–2019	Sweden U17	19	(1)
2019–2021	Sweden U19	4	(0)
2022	Sweden U21	2	(1)
- * Club domestic league appearances and goals as of 12 November 2026 ‡ National team caps and goals as of 22:41, 13 January 2023 (UTC)

Fredrik Oscar Olle Uddenäs (born 17 August 2002) is a Swedish professional footballer who plays as a winger for Östers IF. Before he joined ”Öster” he played in a Dutch club Excelsior, but was loaned out to AIK

== Career ==
Uddenäs is a product of the youth academy of GIF Nike, and moved to Malmö FF from the age of 8 to the U19s. In the summer of 2019, he moved to the youth side of the Italian club S.P.A.L.

After a year as a youth professional in Italy, Uddenäs returned to Sweden, signing with Värnamo. He helped Värnamo win the 2020 Ettan, earning promotion into the Superettan. In his sophomore year, Uddenäs worked his way into a starting spot in the squad and had a breakthrough season, scoring 6 goals and helping the team win the 2021 Superettan and again earning promotion. He was named the "Superettan's Best Young Player" to finish the season.

On 6 December 2021, Uddenäs transferred to Häcken in the Allsvenskan, signing a 4-year contract.

On 29 July 2023, Eredivisie side Excelsior announced the signing of Uddenäs on a three-year contract, with an option for a further year, for an undisclosed fee. On 26 August 2024, Uddenäs returned to Sweden and joined AIK on loan until 30 June 2025, with an option to buy. He didn't get much playing time for AIK and when his loan deal ended Öster IF bought Uddenäs from Excelsior for an undisclosed deal.

== International career ==
Uddenäs is a youth international, having represented the U17s and U19s. He was part of Sweden's U17s squad at the 2019 UEFA European Under-17 Championship.

== Honours ==
Värnamo

- Superettan: 2021
- Ettan: 2020

BK Häcken

- Allsvenskan: 2022
