= Richie Omorowa =

Swedish footballer (born 2004)

Personal information
- Full name: Efosa Richie Omorowa
- Date of birth: 30 March 2004 (age 22)
- Place of birth: Akalla, Sweden
- Height: 1.71 m (5 ft 7 in)
- Position: Forward

Team information
- Current team: Samsunspor

Youth career
- Akropolis
- 2013–2020: AIK
- 2020–2022: Brommapojkarna

Senior career*
Years	Team	Apps	(Gls)
2022–2023	Brommapojkarna	23	(4)
2023–2025	Excelsior	49	(12)
2025–	Samsunspor	0	(0)
2025	→ Degerfors IF (loan)	10	(0)
2025–2026	→ Olympiakos Nicosia (loan)	11	(0)

International career^{‡}
2019	Sweden U17	2	(0)
2021–2023	Sweden U19	14	(2)
2024–2026	Sweden U21	14	(5)
- * Club domestic league appearances and goals as of 29 May 2026 ‡ National team caps and goals as of 17:19, 6 October 2026 (UTC)

Efosa Richie Omorowa (born 30 March 2004) is a Swedish professional footballer who played as a forward for Olympiakos Nicosia, on loan from Samsunspor.

== Career ==
Omorowa is a youth product of the Swedish club AIK, moving to the youth side of Brommapojkarna on 18 July 2021. He began his senior career with Brommapojkarna in 2022 and helped them win the 2022 Superettan. On 28 July 2023, he transferred to Dutch club Excelsior on a 2-year contract. He scored as a substitute in his debut with Excelsior, a 4–3 Eredivisie win over NEC.

On 29 July 2025, Omorowa joined Allsvenskan club Degerfors IF on loan from Türkish side Samsunspor which he had otherwise joined the day before.

== International career ==
Omorowa was born in Sweden to a Nigerian father and Ivorian mother. He is a youth international for Sweden, having played up to the Sweden U19s.

== Honours ==
Brommapojkarna

- Superettan: 2022
