= Egyptians =

Ethnic group native to Egypt

المصريين

Total population
- 120 million (2017)

Regions with significant populations
- Egypt; 118,366,000 (2025 estimate)

Significant Egyptian diaspora in
- Saudi Arabia: 1,500,000
- Libya: ~1,000,000–2,000,000 (pre-2011)
- United States: 1,000,000–1,500,000
- Jordan: 600,000–1,600,000
- United Arab Emirates: 765,000
- Kuwait: 500,000
- Sudan: 500,000
- Qatar: 300,000
- Italy: 161,551
- Canada: 99,140
- Israel: 63,500 (Egyptian Jews)
- France: 60,000
- Oman: 56,000
- Australia: 43,213
- Lebanon: 40,000
- South Africa: 40,000
- United Kingdom: 39,000
- Germany: 32,505
- Netherlands: 29,483
- Greece: 29,000
- Turkey: 28,304
- Palestine: 22,000
- Switzerland: 15,939
- Iraq: 14,710
- Sweden: 13,488
- Yemen: 7,710
- South Sudan: 5,000
- Brazil: 3,809
- Morocco: 2,000
- Japan: 2,000
- Tunisia: 1,000
- Mali: 1,000

Languages
- Egyptian Arabic; Sa'idi Arabic; Coptic

Religion
- Majority: Islam (predominantly Sunni); Minority: Christianity (predominantly Orthodox)

Related ethnic groups
- Afroasiatic-speaking peoples

Egyptians (Note: (Egyptian Arabic: مصريين, romanized: Maṣriyyīn, IPA: [mɑsˤɾɪjˈjiːn]; Arabic: مِصرِيُّون, romanized: Miṣriyyūn, IPA: [mɪsˤrɪjˈjuːn]; Coptic: ⲣⲉⲙⲛ̀ⲭⲏⲙⲓ, romanized: remenkhēmi)) are an ethnic group native to the Nile Valley in Egypt. Egyptian identity is closely tied to geography. The population is concentrated in the Nile Valley, a small strip of cultivable land stretching from the First Cataract to the Mediterranean and enclosed by desert both to the east and to the west. This unique geography has been the basis of the development of Egyptian society since antiquity.

The daily language of the Egyptians is a continuum of the local varieties of Arabic; the most famous dialect is known as Egyptian Arabic or Masri. Additionally, a sizable minority of Egyptians living in Upper Egypt speak Sa'idi Arabic. Egyptians are predominantly Muslims, who are in turn majority Sunni with a small Shia minority and a significant proportion who follow native Sufi orders. A considerable minority of Egyptians are Christians who belong to the Coptic Orthodox Church, whose liturgical language, Coptic, is the most recent stage of the ancient Egyptian language and is still used in prayers along with Egyptian Arabic.

== Terminology ==
Egyptians have received several names:

- 𓂋𓍿𓀂𓁐𓏥𓈖𓆎𓅓𓏏𓊖 rmṯ n Km.t, the native Egyptian name and description of the Black Soil of the Nile Valley. In antiquity The name is vocalized as "ræm/en/kā/mi" ⲣⲉⲙⲛ̀ⲭⲏⲙⲓ in the late Bohairic stage of the language during the Greco-Roman era. ("ni/ræm/en/kāmi" ⲛⲓⲣⲉⲙⲛ̀ⲭⲏⲙⲓ with the plural definite article, Black Lands).
- Egyptians, from Greek "Αἰγύπτιοι", Aiguptioi, from "Αἴγυπτος", "Aiguptos". Prominent Ancient Greek Geographer, Strabo, provided a folk etymology stating that "Αἴγυπτος" had evolved as a compound from "Aἰγαίου ὑπτίως" Aegaeou huptiōs, meaning "Below the Aegean [sea]". In English, the noun Egyptian appears in 1398, in a translation by John Trevisa.
- Copts (قبط, qibṭ, qubṭ), also a derivative of the Greek word Αἰγύπτιος, Aiguptios ("Egypt"), that appeared under Muslim rule when it overtook Roman rule in Egypt. Coptic was the language of the Christian church and people, but lost its popularity to Arabic after the Muslim conquest. Islam became the dominant religion centuries after the Muslim conquest in Egypt. This is due to centuries of conversion from Christianity to Islam. The modern term then became exclusively associated with Egyptian Christianity and Coptic Christians who are members of the Coptic Orthodox Church or Coptic Catholic Church. References to native Muslims as Copts are attested until the Mamluk period.
- Masryeen (Egyptian Arabic: مَصريين, romanized: Maṣriyyīn), the modern Egyptian Arabic name, which comes from the ancient Afroasiatic and Semitic name for Egypt. The term originally connoted "Civilization" or "Metropolis". Classical Arabic Miṣr (Egyptian Arabic Maṣr) is directly cognate with the Biblical Hebrew Mitsráyīm (מִצְרַיִם / מִצְרָיִם), meaning "the two straits", a reference to the predynastic separation of Upper and Lower Egypt. Also mentioned in several Semitic languages as Mesru, Misir, and Masar. The term "Misr" in Arabic refers to Egypt, but sometimes also to the Cairo area, as a consequence, and because of the habit of identifying people with cities rather than countries (i.e. Tunis (capital of Tunisia), Tunsi). The term Masreyeen originally referred only to the native inhabitants of Cairo or "City of Misr" before its meaning expanded to encompass all Egyptians. Edward William Lane, writing in the 1820s, said that the native Muslim inhabitants of Cairo commonly call themselves El-Maṣreeyeen, Ewlad Maṣr (lit. Children of Masr), and Ahl Maṣr (lit. The People of Masr). He also added that the Ottoman rulers of the region "stigmatized" the people of Egypt with the name Ahl-Far'ūn or the 'People of the Pharaoh'.

== Demographics ==
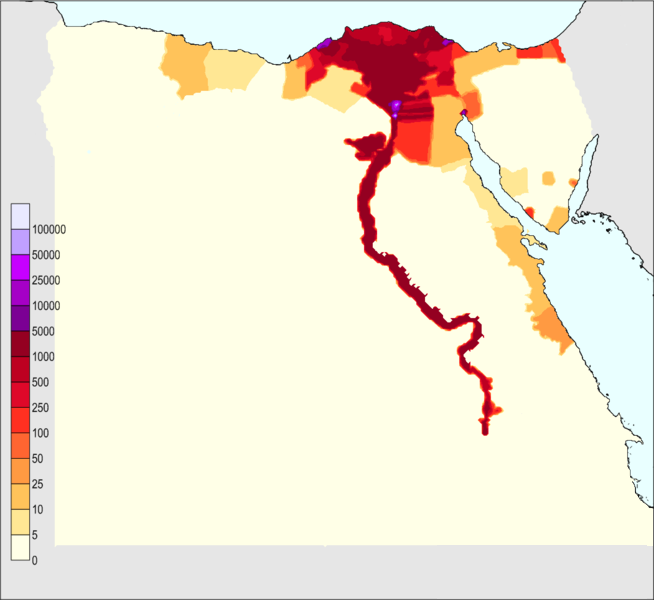
A map of Egypt's population density

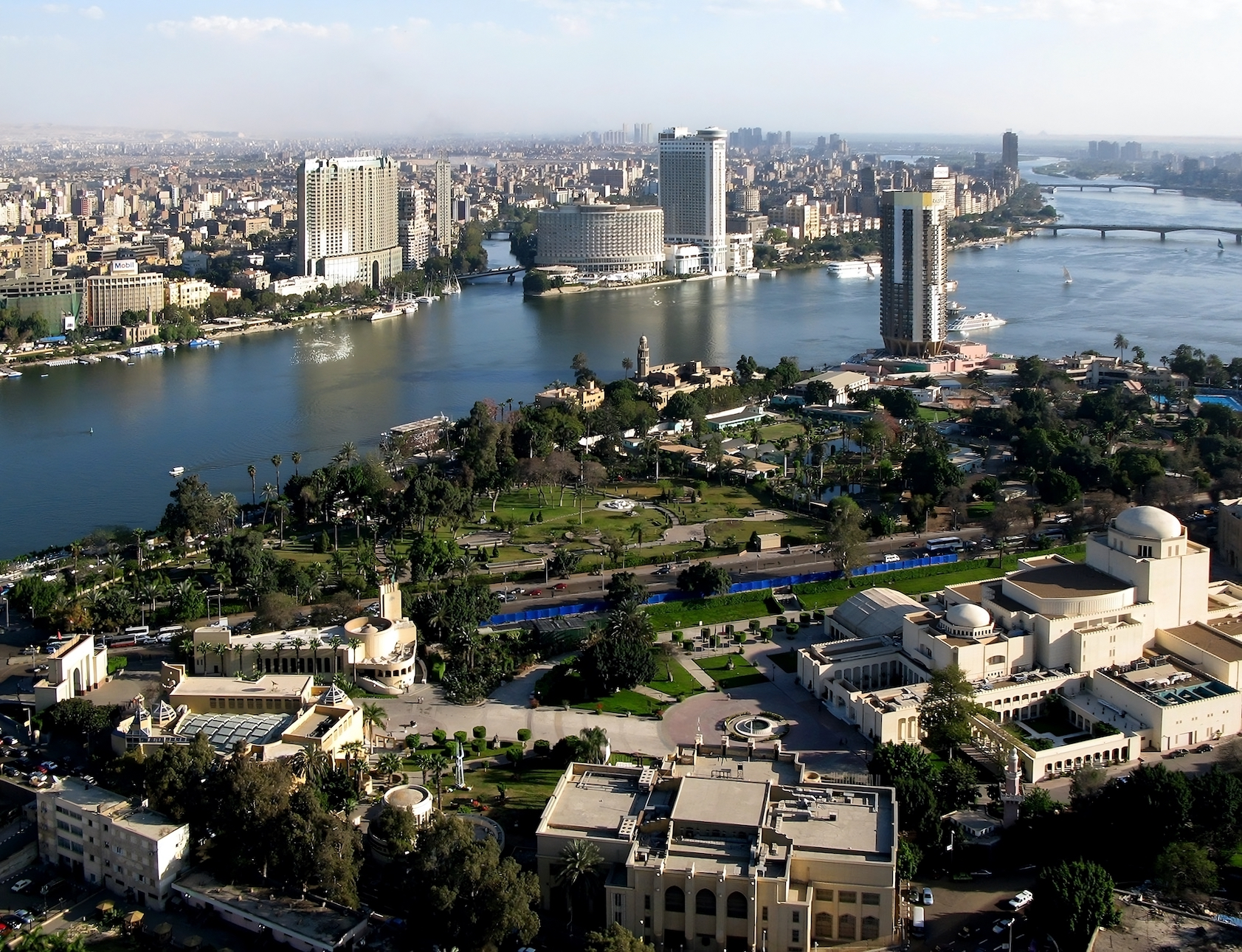
A view of Cairo, the largest city in Africa and the Middle East. The Cairo Opera House (bottom-right) is the main performing arts venue in the Egyptian capital.

There are an estimated 105.3 million Egyptians. Most are native to Egypt, where Egyptians constitute around 99.6% of the population.

Approximately 84–90% of the population of Egypt are Muslim adherents and 10–15% are Christian adherents (10–15% Coptic Christian, 1% other Christian Sects (mainly Greek Orthodox)) according to estimates. Most of Egypt's people live along the banks of the Nile River, and more than two-fifths of the population lives in urban areas. Along the Nile, the population density is one of the highest in the world, in excess of 5,000 persons per square mile (1,900 persons/km^{2}) in a number of riverine governorates. The rapidly growing population is young, with roughly one-third of the total under age 15 and about three-fifths under 30. In response to the strain put on Egypt's economy by the country's burgeoning population, a national family planning program was initiated in 1964, and by the 1990s it had succeeded in lowering the birth rate. Improvements in health care also brought the infant mortality rate well below the world average by the turn of the 21st century. Life expectancy averages about 72 years for men and 74 years for women. Egyptians also form smaller minorities in neighboring countries, North America, Europe and Australia.

Egyptians also tend to be provincial, meaning their attachment extends not only to Egypt but to the specific provinces, towns and villages from which they hail. Therefore, return migrants, such as temporary workers abroad, come back to their region of origin in Egypt. According to the International Organization for Migration, an estimated 2.7 million Egyptians live abroad and contribute actively to the development of their country through remittances (US$7.8 billion in 2009), circulation of human and social capital, as well as investment. Approximately 70% of Egyptian migrants live in Arab countries (923,600 in Saudi Arabia, 332,600 in Libya, 226,850 in Jordan, 190,550 in Kuwait with the rest elsewhere in the region) and the remaining 30% are living mostly in Europe and North America (318,000 in the United States, 110,000 in Canada and 90,000 in Italy).

Their characteristic rootedness as Egyptians, commonly explained as the result of centuries as a farming people clinging to the banks of the Nile, is reflected in sights, sounds and atmosphere that are meaningful to all Egyptians. Dominating the intangible pull of Egypt is the ever present Nile, which is more than a constant backdrop. Its varying colors and changing water levels signal the coming and going of the Nile flood that sets the rhythm of farming in a rainless country and holds the attention of all Egyptians. No Egyptian is ever far from his river and, except for the Alexandrines whose personality is split by looking outward toward the Mediterranean, the Egyptians are a hinterland people with little appetite for travel, even inside their own country. They glorify their national dishes, including the variety of concoctions surrounding the simple bean. Most of all, they have a sense of all-encompassing familiarity at home and a sense of alienation when abroad ... There is something particularly excruciating about Egyptian nostalgia for Egypt: it is sometimes outlandish, but the attachment flows through all Egyptians, as the Nile through Egypt.

A sizable Egyptian diaspora did not begin to form until well into the 1980s, when political and economic conditions began driving Egyptians out of the country in significant numbers. Today, the diaspora numbers nearly 4 million (2006 est). Generally, those who emigrate to the United States and western European countries tend to do so permanently, with 93% and 55.5% of Egyptians (respectively) settling in the new country. On the other hand, Egyptians migrating to Arab countries almost always only go there with the intention of returning to Egypt; virtually none settle in the new country on a permanent basis.

Prior to 1974, only few Egyptian professionals had left the country in search for employment. Political, demographic and economic pressures led to the first wave of emigration after 1952. Later more Egyptians left their homeland first after the 1973 boom in oil prices and again in 1979, but it was only in the second half of the 1980s that Egyptian migration became prominent.

Egyptian emigration today is motivated by even higher rates of unemployment, population growth and increasing prices. Political repression and human rights violations by Egypt's ruling régime are other contributing factors (see Egypt § Human rights). Egyptians have also been impacted by the wars between Egypt and Israel, particularly after the Six-Day War in 1967, when migration rates began to rise. In August 2006, Egyptians made headlines when 11 students from Mansoura University failed to show up at their American host institutions for a cultural exchange program in the hope of finding employment.

Egyptians in neighboring countries face additional challenges. Over the years, abuse, exploitation and/or ill-treatment of Egyptian workers and professionals in the Arab states of the Persian Gulf, Iraq and Libya have been reported by the Egyptian Human Rights Organization and different media outlets. Arab nationals have in the past expressed fear over an "'Egyptianization' of the local dialects and culture that were believed to have resulted from the predominance of Egyptians in the field of education" (see also Egyptian Arabic – Geographics).

A Newsweek article in 2008 featured Egyptian citizens objecting to a prudish "Saudization" of their culture due to Saudi Arabian petrodollar-flush investment in the Egyptian entertainment industry. On two occasions, Libya was on the brink of war with Egypt due to mistreatment of Egyptian workers and after the signing of the peace treaty with Israel. When the Gulf War ended, Egyptian workers in Iraq were subjected to harsh measures and expulsion by the Iraqi government and to violent attacks by Iraqis returning from the war to fill the workforce.

== History ==
=== Ancient Egypt ===
r T A1 B1 Z3 km m t niwt
'People of the Black Lands'
in hieroglyphs

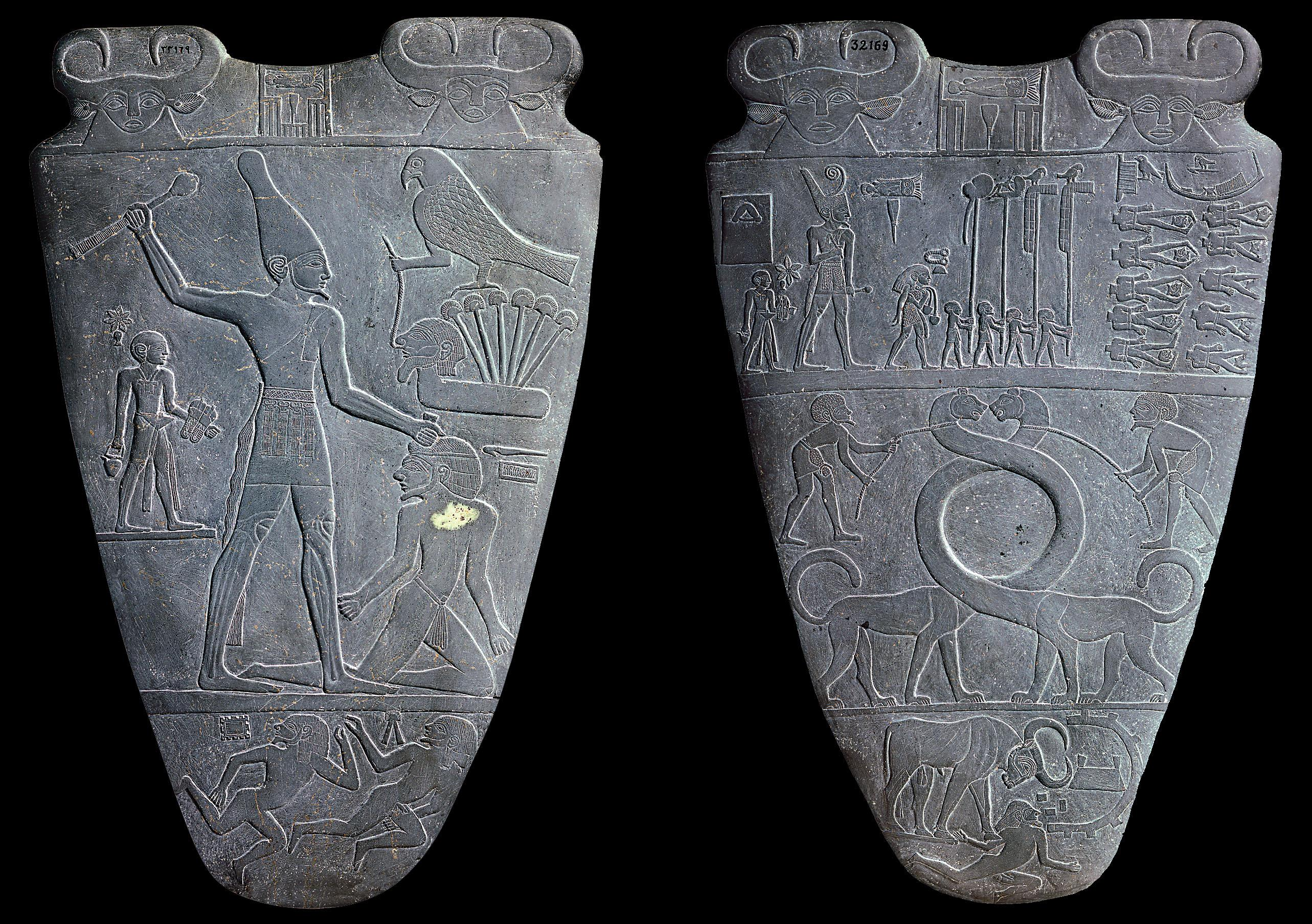
The Narmer Palette depicts the unification of the Two Lands.

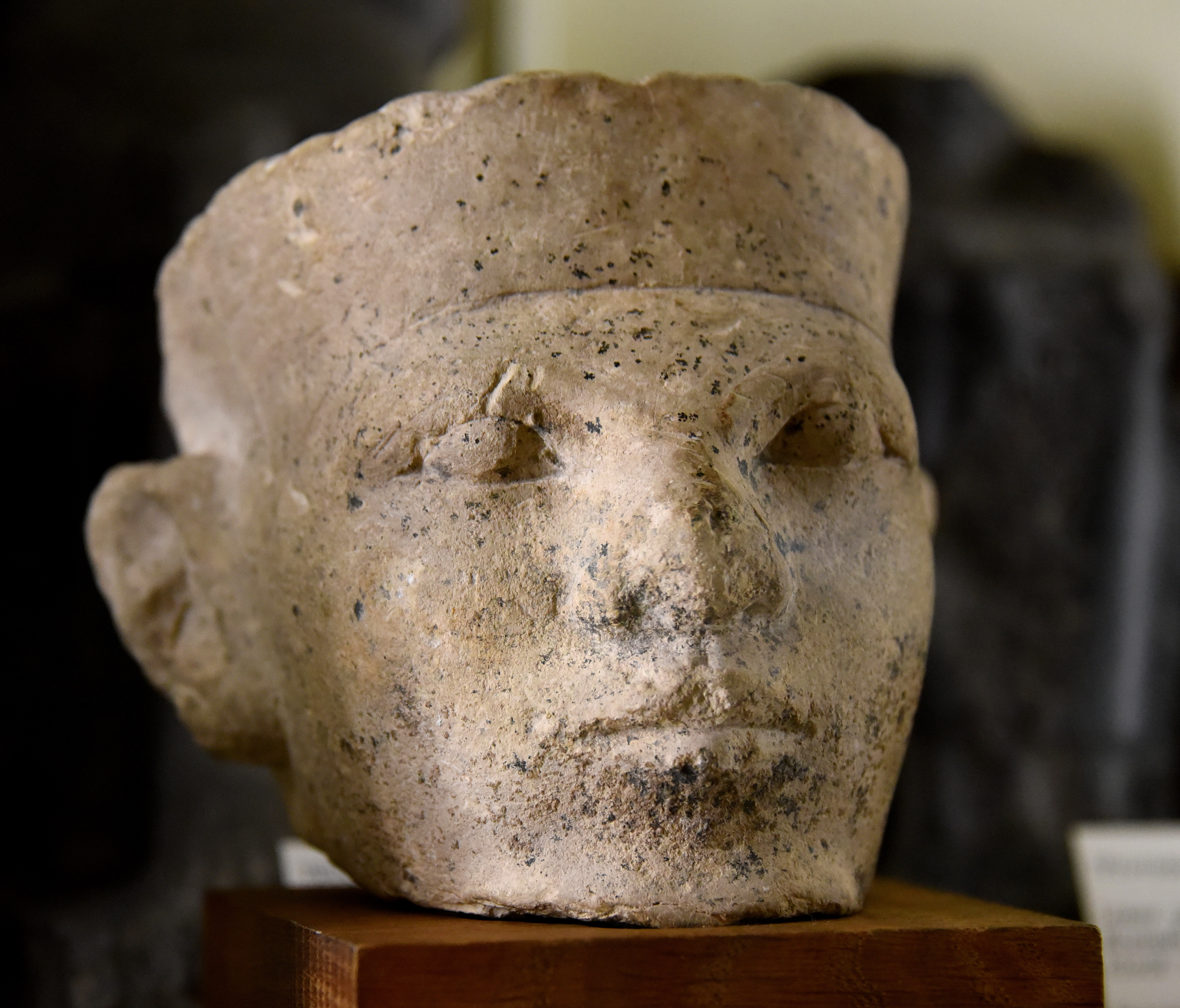
Limestone head of an early Egyptian king, The Petrie Museum. Modern scholars have considered the stone bust to depict an Early Dynastic or Old Kingdom pharaoh.

Ancient Egypt saw a succession of thirty dynasties spanning three millennia. During this period, Egyptian culture underwent significant development in terms of religion, arts, language, and customs.

Egypt fell under Hyksos rule in the Middle Bronze Age. The native nobility managed to expel the conquerors by the Late Bronze Age, thereby initiating the New Kingdom. During this period, the Egyptian civilization rose to the status of an empire under Pharaoh Thutmose III of the 18th Dynasty. It remained a super-regional power throughout the Amarna Period as well as during the 19th and 20th dynasties (the Ramesside Period), lasting into the Early Iron Age.

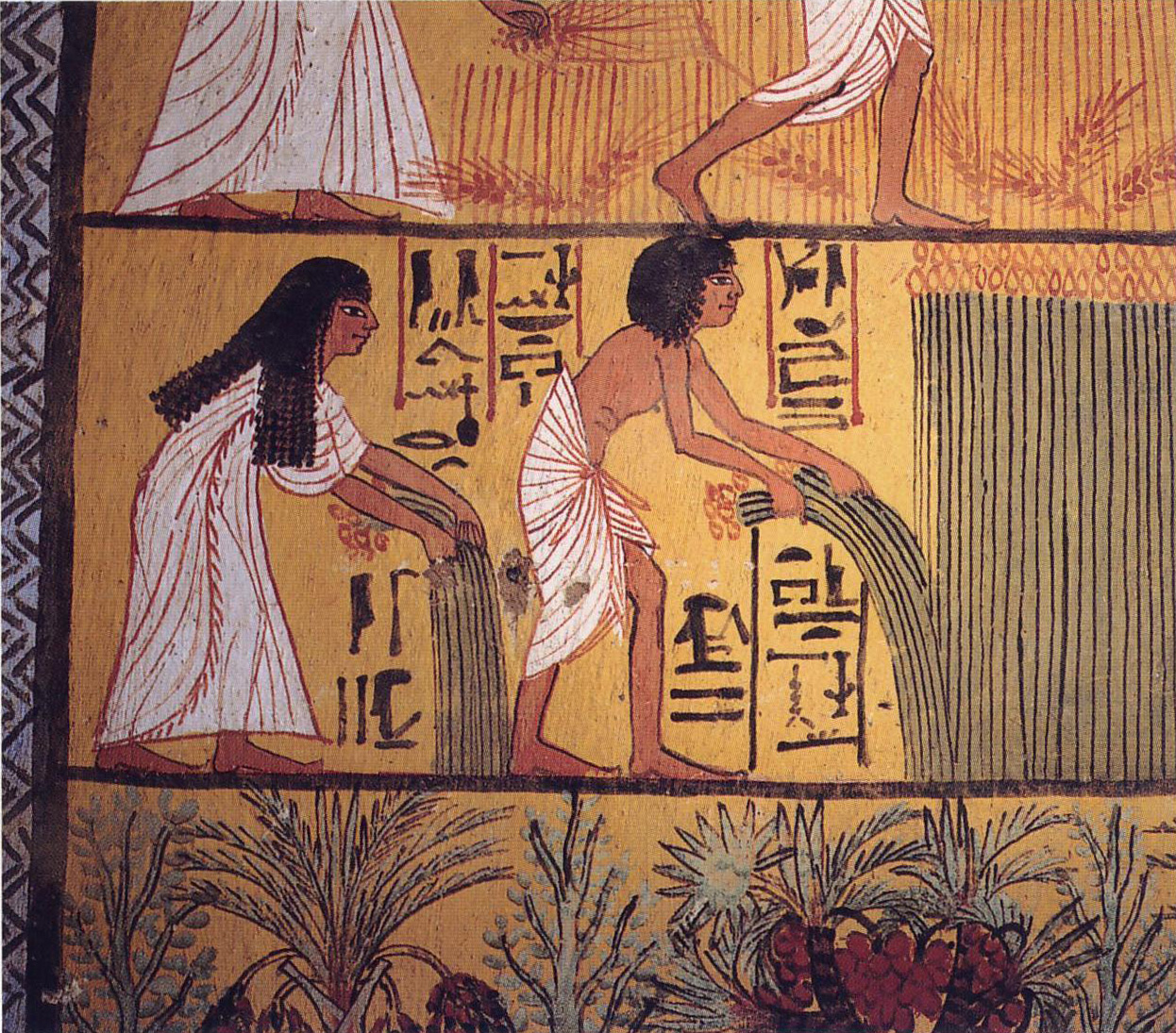
Egyptian peasants harvesting papyrus, as depicted in the tomb of Sennutem, dating from the 13th to 11th centuries BCE.

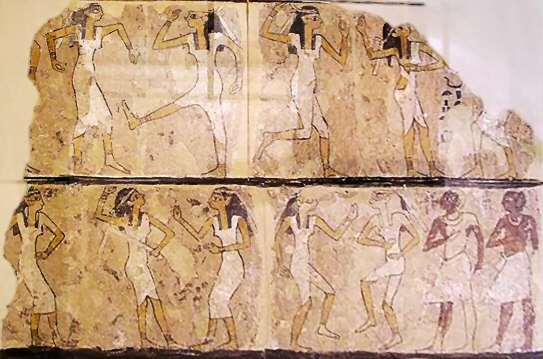
A wall painting showing female dancers, as depicted in the Tomb of Dancers in Thebes, dating from the 18th to 16th century BC.

The Bronze Age collapse that had afflicted the Mesopotamian empires reached Egypt with some delay, and it was only in the 11th century BC that the Empire declined, falling into the comparative obscurity of the Third Intermediate Period of Egypt. The 25th Dynasty of Nubian rulers was again briefly replaced by native nobility in the 7th century BC, and in 525 BC, Egypt fell under Persian rule.

Egypt fell under Greek control after Alexander the Great's conquest in 332 BC. The Late Period of ancient Egypt is taken to end with his death in 323 BC. The Ptolemaic dynasty ruled Egypt from 305 BC to 30 BC and introduced Hellenic culture to Egyptians. 4,000 Celtic mercenaries under Ptolemy II had even attempted an ambitious but doomed coup d'état around the year 270 BC.

Throughout the Pharaonic epoch (viz., from 2920 BC to 525 BC in conventional Egyptian chronology), divine kingship was the glue which held Egyptian society together. It was especially pronounced in the Old Kingdom and Middle Kingdom and continued until the Roman conquest. The societal structure created by this system of government remained virtually unchanged up to modern times.

The role of the king was considerably weakened after the 20th Dynasty. The king in his role as Son of Ra was entrusted to maintain Ma'at, the principle of truth, justice, and order, and to enhance the country's agricultural economy by ensuring regular Nile floods. Ascendancy to the Egyptian throne reflected the myth of Horus who assumed kingship after he buried his murdered father Osiris. The king of Egypt, as a living personification of Horus, could claim the throne after burying his predecessor, who was typically his father. When the role of the king waned, the country became more susceptible to foreign influence and invasion.

The attention paid to the dead, and the veneration with which they were held, were one of the hallmarks of ancient Egyptian society. Egyptians built tombs for their dead that were meant to last for eternity. This was most prominently expressed by the Great Pyramids. The ancient Egyptian word for tomb pr nḥḥ means House of Eternity. The Egyptians also celebrated life, as is shown by tomb reliefs and inscriptions, papyri and other sources depicting Egyptians farming, conducting trade expeditions, hunting, holding festivals, attending parties and receptions with their pet dogs, cats and monkeys, dancing and singing, enjoying food and drink, and playing games. The ancient Egyptians were also known for their engaging sense of humor, much like their modern descendants.

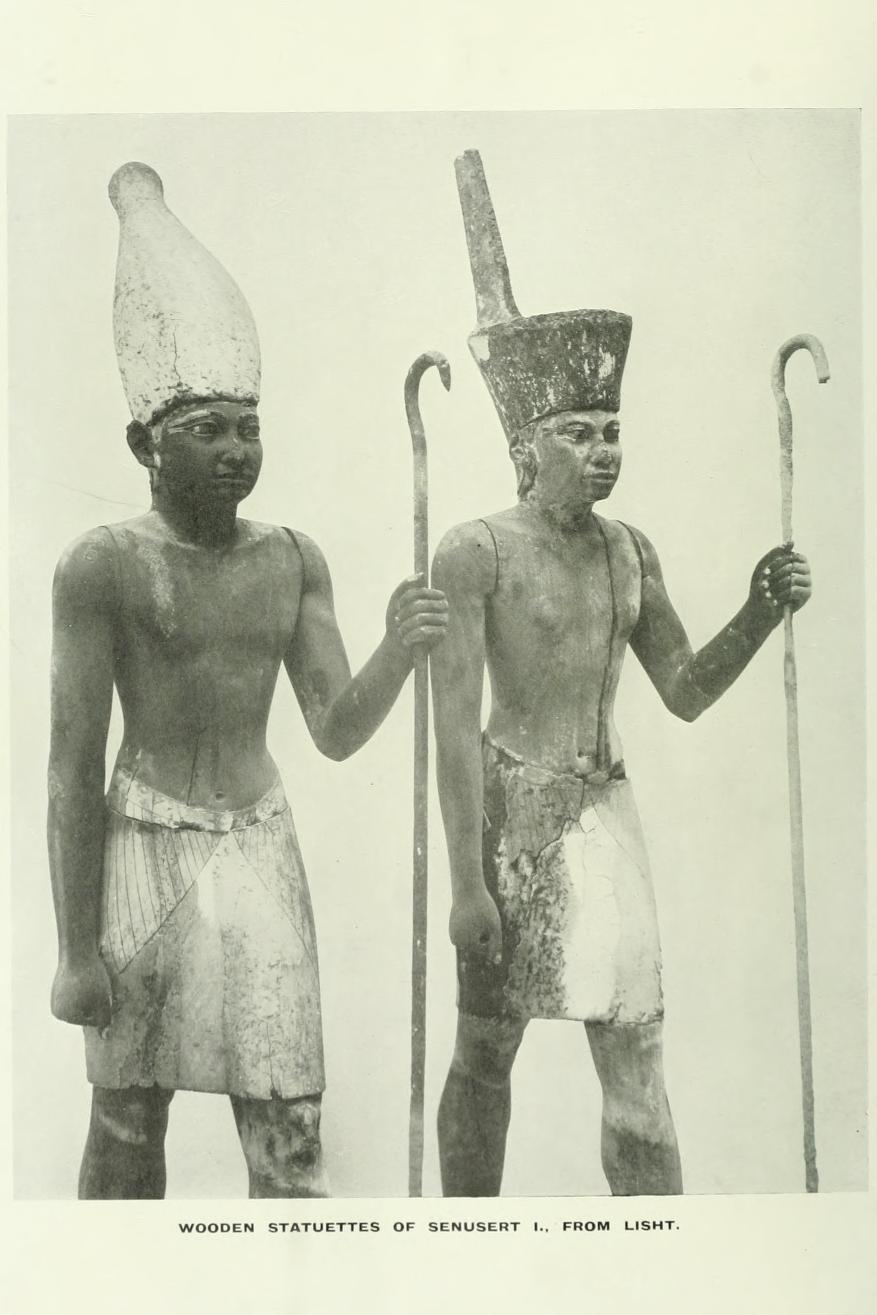
A couple of statuettes which represent a Middle Kingdom pharaoh as King of Upper Egypt (left, with the white crown) and King of Lower Egypt (right, with the red crown); wood, from el-Lisht, 12th dynasty, Middle Kingdom (Egyptian Museum, main floor, room 22, JE44951)

Another important continuity during this period is the Egyptian attitude toward foreigners—those they considered not fortunate enough to be part of the community of rmṯ or "the people" (i.e., Egyptians.) This attitude was facilitated by the Egyptians' more frequent contact with other peoples during the New Kingdom when Egypt expanded to an empire that also encompassed Nubia through Jebel Barkal and parts of the Levant.

The Egyptian sense of superiority was given religious validation, as foreigners in the land of Ta-Meri (Egypt) were anathema to the maintenance of Maat—a view most clearly expressed by the admonitions of Ipuwer in reaction to the chaotic events of the Second Intermediate Period. Foreigners in Egyptian texts were described in derogatory terms, e.g., 'wretched Asiatics' (Semites), 'vile Kushites' (Nubians), and 'Ionian dogs' (Greeks). Egyptian beliefs remained unchallenged when Egypt fell to the Hyksos, Assyrians, Libyans, Persians and Greeks—their rulers assumed the role of the Egyptian Pharaoh and were often depicted praying to Egyptian gods.

The ancient Egyptians used a solar calendar that divided the year into 12 months of 30 days each, with five extra days added. The calendar revolved around the annual Nile Inundation (akh.t), the first of three seasons into which the year was divided. The other two were Winter and Summer, each lasting for four months. The modern Egyptian fellahin calculate the agricultural seasons, with the months still bearing their ancient names, in much the same manner.

The importance of the Nile in Egyptian life, ancient and modern, cannot be overemphasized. The rich alluvium carried by the Nile inundation was the basis of Egypt's formation as a society and a state. Regular inundations were a cause for celebration; low waters often meant famine and starvation. The ancient Egyptians personified the river flood as the god Hapi and dedicated a Hymn to the Nile to celebrate it. km.t, the Black Land, was as Herodotus observed, "the gift of the river."

=== Graeco-Roman period ===
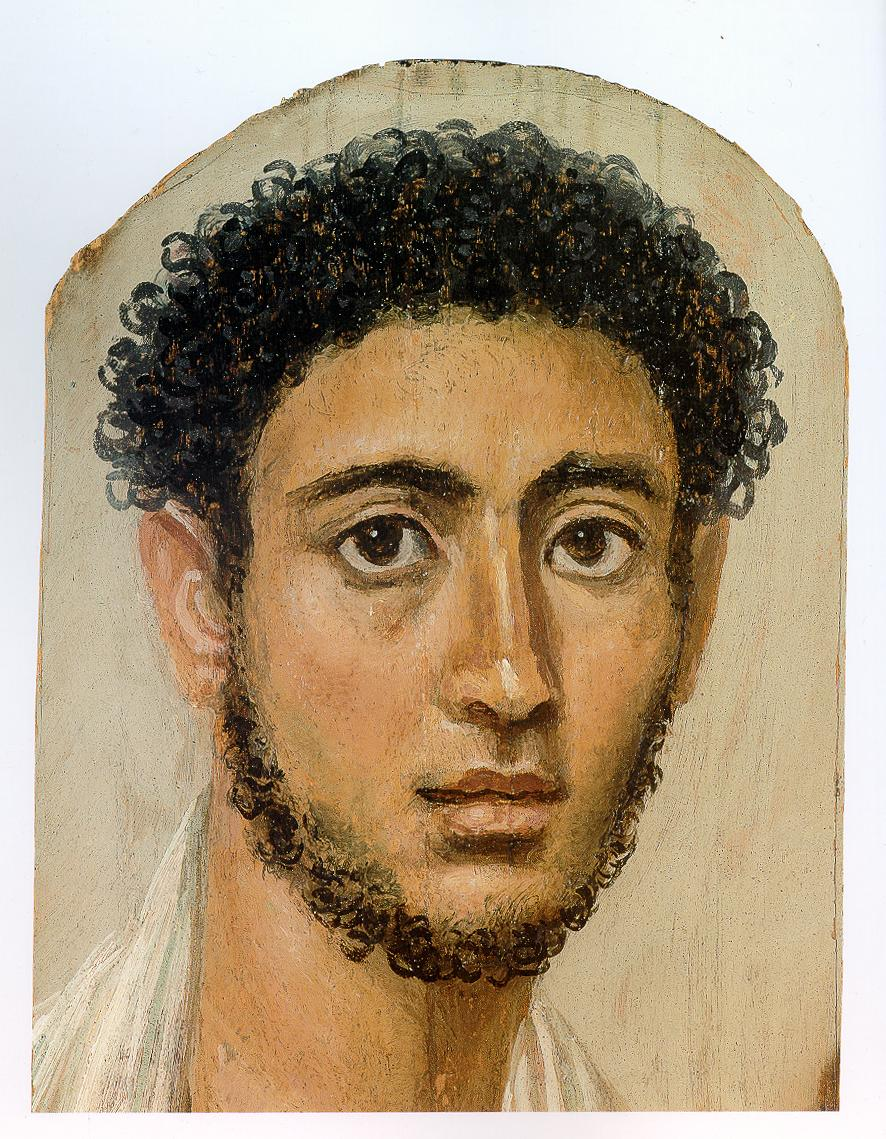
A portrait of an Egyptian mummy from the Fayum collection, Roman Egypt. c. AD 125 − AD 150

When Alexander died, a story began to circulate that Nectanebo II was Alexander's father. This made Alexander in the eyes of the Egyptians a legitimate heir to the native pharaohs. The new Ptolemaic rulers, however, exploited Egypt for their own benefit and a great social divide was created between Egyptians and Greeks. The local priesthood continued to wield power as they had during the Dynastic age. Egyptians continued to practice their religion undisturbed and largely maintained their own separate communities from their foreign conquerors. The language of administration became Greek, but the mass of the Egyptian population was Egyptian-speaking and concentrated in the countryside, while most Greeks lived in Alexandria and only few had any knowledge of Egyptian.

The Ptolemaic rulers all retained their Greek names and titles, but projected a public image of being Egyptian pharaohs. Much of this period's vernacular literature was composed in the demotic phase and script of the Egyptian language. It was focused on earlier stages of Egyptian history when Egyptians were independent and ruled by great native pharaohs such as Ramesses II. Prophetic writings circulated among Egyptians promising expulsion of the Greeks, and frequent revolts by the Egyptians took place throughout the Ptolemaic period. A revival in animal cults, the hallmark of the Predynastic and Early Dynastic periods, is said to have come about to fill a spiritual void as Egyptians became increasingly disillusioned and weary due to successive waves of foreign invasions.

The Egyptians waged rebellions against the Ptolemies, often caused by an unwanted foreign rule, and were involved in foreign and civil wars that led to the decline of the kingdom and its annexation by Rome. The most significant was the Great Theban Revolt (206–186 BC), which established an autonomous state ruled by native pharaohs in Upper Egypt. Egyptian leaders seized control of Thebes and much of Upper Egypt by 205 BC, severely weakening Ptolemaic control over Egypt. The Ptolemaic forces were defeated by the Roman Empire in the Battle of Actium (30 BC), marking the Conquest of Egypt. Nevertheless, Hellenistic culture continued to thrive in Egypt well after the Muslim conquest. The native Egyptian/Coptic culture continued to exist as well (the Coptic language itself was Egypt's most widely spoken language until at least the 10th century).

When the Romans annexed Egypt in 30 BC, the social structure created by the Greeks was largely retained, though the power of the Egyptian priesthood diminished. The Roman emperors lived abroad and did not perform the ceremonial functions of Egyptian kingship as the Ptolemies had. The art of mummy portraiture flourished, but Egypt became further stratified with Romans at the apex of the social pyramid, Greeks and Jews occupied the middle stratum, while Egyptians, who constituted the vast majority, were at the bottom. Egyptians paid a poll tax at full rate, Greeks paid at half-rate and Roman citizens were exempt.

Egyptians waged rebellions against foreign Roman Roman rule, the Revolt of Thebes (c. 30–29 BC), took place immediately following the war. The region near the southern border maintained a unique position, acting as a bridge to Nubia, with local elites sometimes exerting control over the Eastern Desert.

Egyptians waged the Bucolic War (172–175), it was a major Egyptian military conflict against Roman rule in Egypt, led by Isidorus, and the Roman Empire led by Emperor Marcus Aurelius. It erupted due to Egyptian resentment of foreign occupation. The first time which Egyptians achieved a crushing victory over the Romans in a decisive battle.

Upper Egypt, was frequently governed by Egyptians who managed local affairs with limited interference from the central Byzantine administration. The southern border, a vital border, was managed by Egyptian military commanders or elite families who developed their local forces to protect the area and exploit the eastern desert. The region's economy was increasingly dominated by large monastic estates and local landowners, rather than state-run enterprises. A cultural de-hellenization was established in Upper Egypt, while Greek remained the language of the bureaucracy, southern Egypt saw a resurgence in the use of the Egyptian language and maintaining the Egyptian identity that was not influenced by Byzantine Greek culture.

The Roman emperor Caracalla advocated the expulsion of all ethnic Egyptians from the city of Alexandria, saying "genuine Egyptians can easily be recognized among the linen-weavers by their speech." This attitude lasted until AD 212 followed by the Alexandrian Revolts (215). when Roman citizenship was finally granted to all the inhabitants of Egypt, though ethnic divisions remained largely entrenched. Later, Egyptian revolts in (292–293 AD) followed by other revolts (297–298 AD) resulted in the Siege of Alexandria.

The Romans, like the Ptolemies, treated Egypt like their own private property, a land exploited for the benefit of a small foreign elite. The Egyptian peasants, pressed for maximum production to meet Roman quotas, suffered and fled to the desert.

The cult of Isis, like those of Osiris and Serapis, had been popular in Egypt and throughout the Roman Empire at the coming of Christianity, and continued to be the main competitor with Christianity in its early years. The main temple of Isis remained a major center of worship in Egypt until the reign of the Byzantine emperor Justinian I in the 6th century, when it was finally closed down. Egyptians, disaffected and weary after a series of foreign occupations, identified the story of the mother-goddess Isis protecting her child Horus with that of the Virgin Mary and her son Jesus escaping the emperor Herod.

In the 4th and 5th centuries, groups of Egyptian communities, rose in revolt against attempts to suppress the cult of Isis and to forcefully convert their temples into churches. This period saw major tension between the Byzantine-led church and the Egyptians. Despite major military efforts from the Byzantines, Egyptian rebels continued to cause unrest.

Consequently, many sites believed to have been the resting places of the Holy Family during their sojourn in Egypt became sacred to the Egyptians. The visit of the Holy Family later circulated among Egyptian Christians as fulfillment of the Biblical prophecy "When Israel was a child, then I loved him, and called my son out of Egypt" (Hosea 11:1). The feast of the coming of the Lord of Egypt on 1 June became an important part of Christian Egyptian tradition. According to tradition, Christianity was brought to Egypt by Saint Mark the Evangelist in the early 40s of the 1st century, under the reign of the Roman emperor Nero. The earliest converts were Jews residing in Alexandria, a city which had by then become a center of culture and learning in the entire Mediterranean oikoumene.

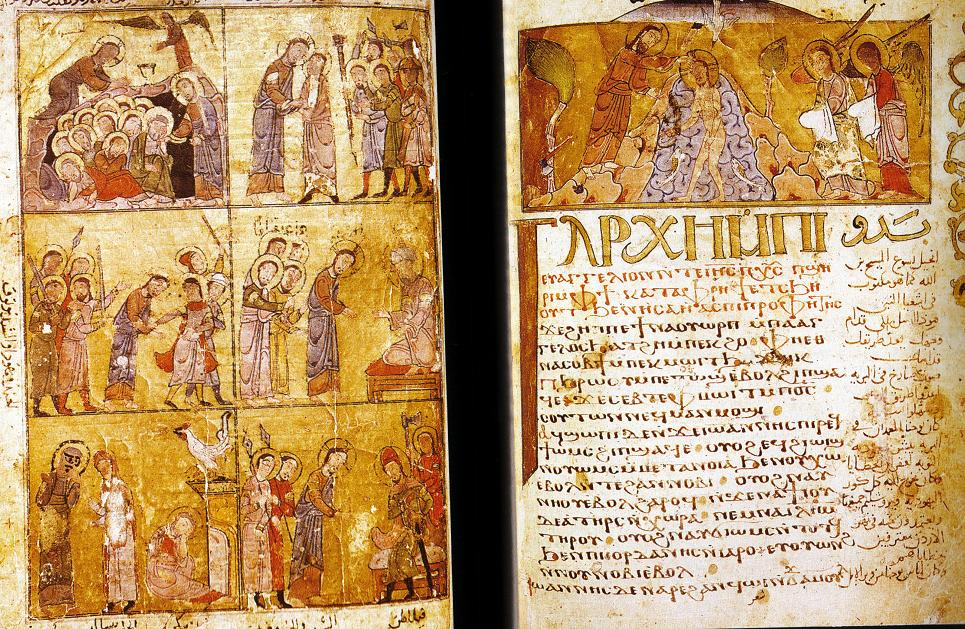
A Coptic-Arabic manuscript, Ayyubid period, AD 1249–50. Images depict Jesus in the Garden of Gethsemane, the kiss of Judas, the arrest of Christ, his appearance before Caiaphas, Peter's denial at cockcrow, Christ before Pilate, and the baptism of Jesus in the Jordan River.

St. Mark is said to have founded the Holy Apostolic See of Alexandria and to have become its first Patriarch. Within 50 years of St. Mark's arrival in Alexandria, a fragment of New Testament writings appeared in Oxyrhynchus (Bahnasa), which suggests that Christianity already began to spread south of Alexandria at an early date. By the mid-third century, a sizable number of Egyptians were persecuted by the Romans on account of having adopted the new Christian faith, beginning with the Edict of Decius. Christianity was tolerated in the Roman Empire until AD 284, when the Emperor Diocletian persecuted and put to death a great number of Christian Egyptians.

This event became a watershed in the history of Egyptian Christianity, marking the beginning of a distinct Egyptian or Coptic Church. It became known as the 'Era of the Martyrs' and is commemorated in the Coptic calendar in which dating of the years began with the start of Diocletian's reign. When Egyptians were persecuted by Diocletian, many retreated to the desert to seek relief. The practice precipitated the rise of monasticism, for which the Egyptians, namely St. Antony, St. Bakhum, St. Shenouda and St. Amun, are credited as pioneers. By the end of the 4th century, it is estimated that the mass of the Egyptians had either embraced Christianity or were nominally Christian.

The Catachetical School of Alexandria was founded in the 3rd century by Pantaenus, becoming a major school of Christian learning as well as science, mathematics and the humanities. The Psalms and part of the New Testament were translated at the school from Greek to Egyptian, which had already begun to be written in Greek letters with the addition of a number of demotic characters. This stage of the Egyptian language would later come to be known as Coptic along with its alphabet. The third theologian to head the Catachetical School was a native Egyptian by the name of Origen. Origen was an outstanding theologian and one of the most influential Church Fathers. He traveled extensively to lecture in various churches around the world and has many important texts to his credit including the Hexapla, an exegesis of various translations of the Hebrew Bible.

At the threshold of the Byzantine period, the New Testament had been entirely translated into Coptic. But while Christianity continued to thrive in Egypt, the old pagan beliefs which had survived the test of time were facing mounting pressure. The Byzantine period was particularly brutal in its zeal to erase any traces of ancient Egyptian religion. Under emperor Theodosius I, Christianity had already been proclaimed the religion of the Empire and all pagan cults were forbidden. When Egypt fell under the jurisdiction of Constantinople after the split of the Roman Empire, many ancient Egyptian temples were either destroyed or converted into monasteries.

One of the defining moments in the history of the Church in Egypt is a controversy that ensued over the nature of Jesus, which culminated in the final split of the Coptic Church from both the Byzantine and Roman Catholic Churches. The Council of Chalcedon convened in AD 451, signaling the Byzantine Empire's determination to assert its hegemony over Egypt. When it declared that Jesus was of two natures embodied in his person, the Egyptian reaction was swift, rejecting the decrees of the council as incompatible with the Miaphysite doctrine of Coptic Orthodoxy. The Copts' upholding of the Miaphysite doctrine against the pro-Chalcedonian Greek Melkites had both theological and national implications. As Coptologist Jill Kamil notes, the position taken by the Egyptians "paved [the way] for the Coptic church to establish itself as a separate entity...No longer even spiritually linked with Constantinople, theologians began to write more in Coptic and less in Greek. Coptic art developed its own national character, and the Copts stood united against the imperial power."

=== Medieval Egypt ===
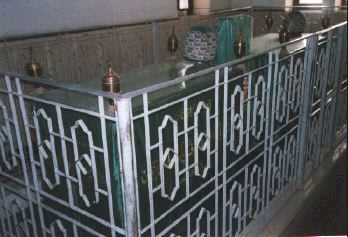
Tomb of Egyptian saint Dhul-Nun al-Misri (AD 796–859) in Cairo's City of the Dead

Before the Muslim conquest of Egypt, the Byzantine Emperor Heraclius was able to reclaim the country after a brief Persian invasion in AD 616, and subsequently appointed Cyrus of Alexandria, a Chalcedonian, as Patriarch. Cyrus was determined to convert the Egyptian Miaphysites by any means. He expelled Coptic monks and bishops from their monasteries and sees. Many died in the chaos, and the resentment of the Egyptians against their Byzantine conquerors reached a peak.

Meanwhile, the new religion of Islam was making headway in Arabia, culminating in the Muslim conquests that took place following Muhammad's death. In AD 639, the Arab general 'Amr ibn al-'As marched into Egypt, facing off with the Byzantines in the Battle of Heliopolis that ended with the Byzantines' defeat. The relationship between the Greek Melkites and the Egyptian Copts had grown so bitter that most Egyptians did not put up heavy resistance against the Arabs.

The new Muslim rulers moved the capital to Fustat and, through the 7th century, retained the existing Byzantine administrative structure with Greek as its language. Native Egyptians filled administrative ranks and continued to worship freely so long as they paid the jizya poll tax, in addition to a land tax that all Egyptians irrespective of religion also had to pay. The authority of the Miaphysite doctrine of the Coptic Church was for the first time nationally recognized.

According to al-Ya'qubi, repeated revolts by Egyptian Christians against the Muslim Arabs took place in the 8th and 9th centuries under the reign of the Umayyads and Abbasids. The greatest was one in which disaffected Muslim Egyptians joined their Christian compatriots around AD 830 in an unsuccessful attempt to repel the Arabs. The Egyptian Muslim historian Ibn Abd al-Hakam spoke harshly of the Abbasids—a reaction that according to Egyptologist Okasha El-Daly can be seen "within the context of the struggle between proud native Egyptians and the central Abbasid caliphate in Iraq."

The form of Islam that eventually took hold in Egypt was Sunni, though very early in this period Egyptians began to blend their new faith with indigenous beliefs and practices that had survived through Coptic Christianity. Just as Egyptians had been pioneers in early monasticism so they were in the development of the mystical form of Islam, Sufism. Various Sufi orders were founded in the 8th century and flourished until the present day. One of the earliest Egyptian Sufis was Dhul-Nun al-Misri (i.e., Dhul-Nun the Egyptian). He was born in Akhmim in AD 796 and achieved political and social leadership over the Egyptian people.

Egyptian resistance to the Arab rule was culminated in the Bashmurian revolts, a series of revolts in the Bashmur region in the north of the Nile Delta against the Umayyad Caliphate and Abbasid Caliphate in the eighth and ninth centuries. Exactly how many revolts took place cannot be determined, but the major military conflicts took place in 749, 767 and 831–832.

Dhul-Nun was regarded as the Patron Saint of the Physicians and is credited with having introduced the concept of Gnosis into Islam, as well as of being able to decipher a number of hieroglyphic characters due to his knowledge of Coptic. He was keenly interested in ancient Egyptian sciences, and claimed to have received his knowledge of alchemy from Egyptian sources.

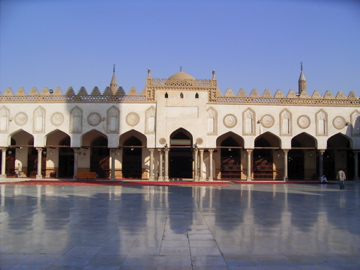
Al-Azhar Mosque, founded in AD 970 by the Fatimids

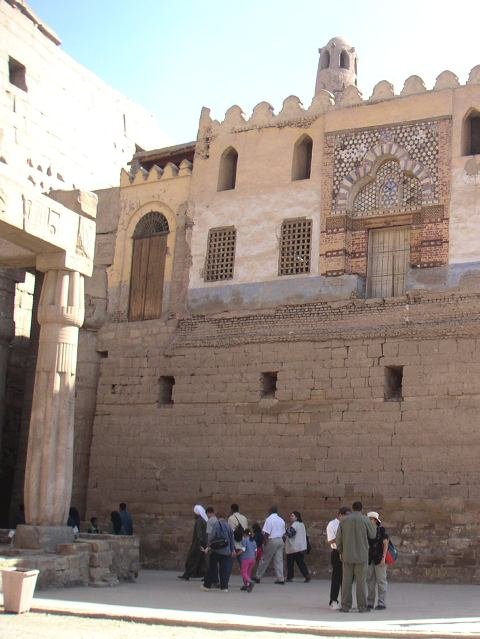
Mosque of Abu Haggag, built in the 11th century over the ruins of a pharaonic temple. The ancient Opet festival associated with this temple is mirrored in the present day festival of Abu-l Haggag celebrated similarly by boat processions through the streets of Luxor.

In the years to follow the Arab occupation of Egypt, a social hierarchy was created whereby Egyptians who converted to Islam acquired the status of mawali or "clients" to the ruling Arab elite, while those who remained Christian became dhimmis. In time the power of the Arabs waned throughout the Islamic Empire so that in the 10th century, the Turkish Ikhshids were able to take control of Egypt and made it an independent political unit from the rest of the empire.

Egyptians continued to live socially and politically separate from their foreign conquerors, but their rulers like the Ptolemies before them were able to stabilize the country and bring renewed economic prosperity. It was under the Shiite Fatimids from the 10th to the 12th centuries that Muslim Egyptian institutions began to take form along with the Egyptian dialect of Arabic, which was to eventually slowly supplant native Egyptian or Coptic as the spoken language.

Al-Azhar was founded in AD 970 in the new capital Cairo, not very far from its ancient predecessor in Memphis. It became the preeminent Muslim center of learning in Egypt and by the Ayyubid period it had acquired a Sunni orientation. The Fatimids with some exceptions were known for their religious tolerance and their observance of local Muslim, Coptic and indigenous Egyptian festivals and customs. Under the Ayyubids, the country for the most part continued to prosper.

The Mamluks of Egypt (AD 1258–1517) as a whole were, some of the most enlightened rulers of Egypt, not only in the arts and in providing for the welfare of their subjects, but also in many other ways, such as efficient organisation of law and order and postal services, and the building of canals, roads, bridges and aqueducts. Though turbulent, often treacherous and brutal in their feuds, and politically and economically inept, the later Mameluks maintained the splendour and artistic traditions of their predecessors. The reign of Kait Bey (1468–1496) was one of high achievement in architecture, showing great refinement of taste in the building of elegant tombs, mosques and palaces. It was a period in which learning flourished.

By the 15th century most Egyptians had already been converted to Islam, while Coptic Christians were reduced to a minority. The Mamluks were mainly ethnic Circassians and Turks who had been captured as slaves then recruited into the army fighting on behalf of the Islamic empire. Historian James Jankwoski writes:

Ultimately, Mamluk rule rested on force. The chronicles of the period are replete with examples of Mamluk violence against the indigenous population of Egypt...From horseback, they simply terrorized those lesser breeds who crossed their paths. The sudden and arbitrary use of force by the government and its dominant military elite; frequent resort to cruelty to make a point; ingenious methods of torture employed both for exemplary purpose and to extract wealth from others: all these measures were routine in the Mamluk era. Egypt under the Mamluks was not a very secure place to live.

=== Ottoman period ===
Egyptians under the Ottoman Turks from the 16th to the 18th centuries lived within a social hierarchy similar to that of the Mamluks, Arabs, Romans, Greeks and Persians before them. Native Egyptians applied the term atrak (Turks) indiscriminately to the Ottomans and Mamluks, who were at the top of the social pyramid, while Egyptians, most of whom were farmers, were at the bottom. Frequent revolts by the Egyptian peasantry against the Ottoman-Mamluk Beys took place throughout the 18th century, particularly in Upper Egypt where the peasants at one point wrested control of the region and declared a separatist government.

The only segment of Egyptian society which appears to have retained a degree of power during this period were the Muslim 'ulama or religious scholars, who directed the religious and social affairs of the native Egyptian population and interceded on their behalf when dealing with the Turko-Circassian elite. It is also believed that during the late periods of the Ottoman era of Egypt, native Egyptians were allowed and required to join the army for the first time since the Roman period of Egypt, including Coptic Christians who were civil servants at the time of Mohammed Ali Pasha.

From the Egyptian side, literary works from both the Mamluk and Ottoman eras indicate that literate Egyptians had not totally submerged their identity within Islam, but retained an awareness of Egypt's distinctiveness as a uniquely fertile region of the Muslim world, as a land of great historical antiquity and splendor... At least for some Egyptians, 'the land of Egypt' (al-diyar al-misriyya) was an identifiable and emotionally meaningful entity within the larger Muslim polity of which it was now a province.

=== Modern history ===
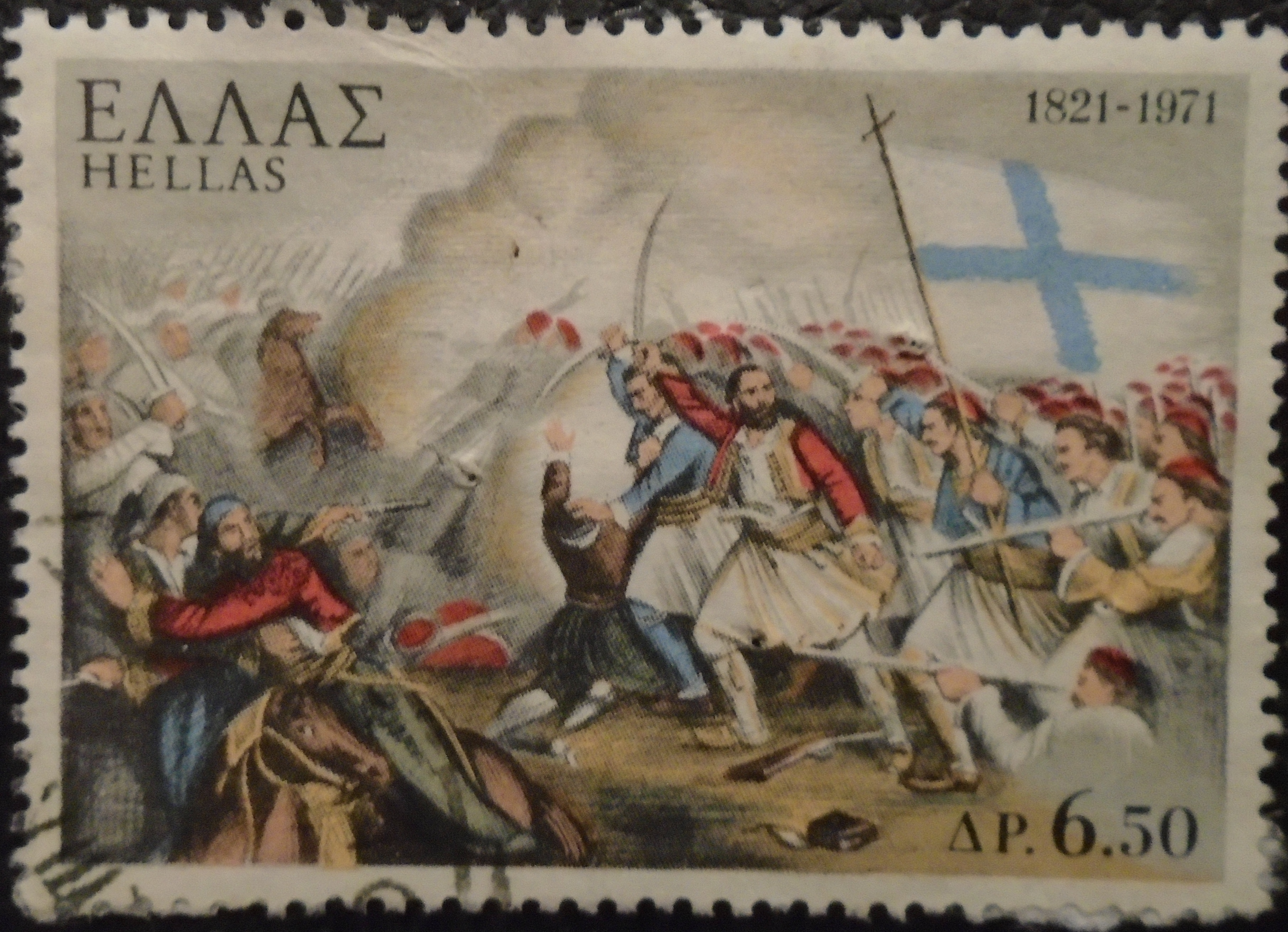
A stamp depicting the Battle of Maniaki in 1821.

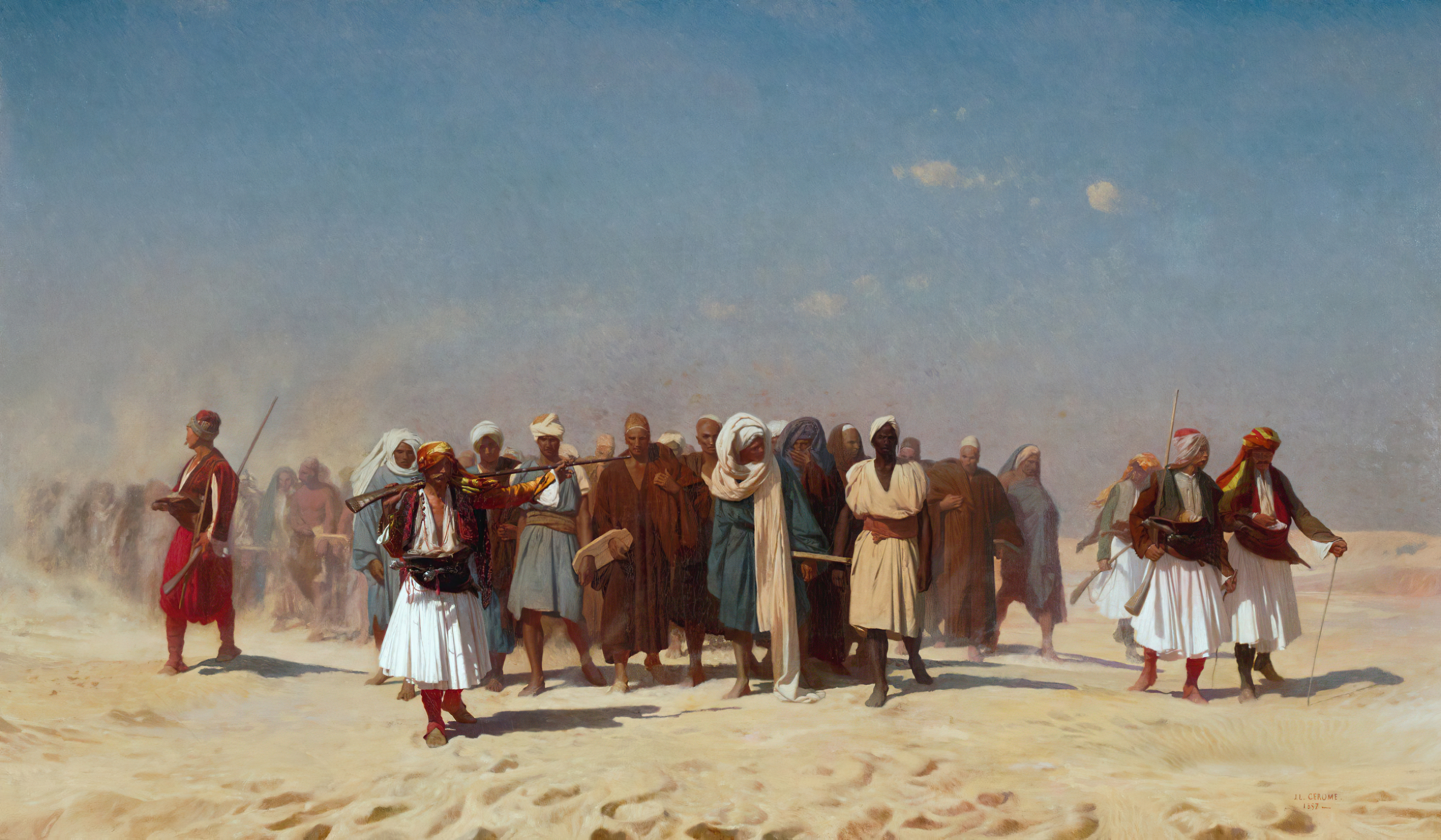
A painting depicting a group of Egyptians traversing the desert, 1857

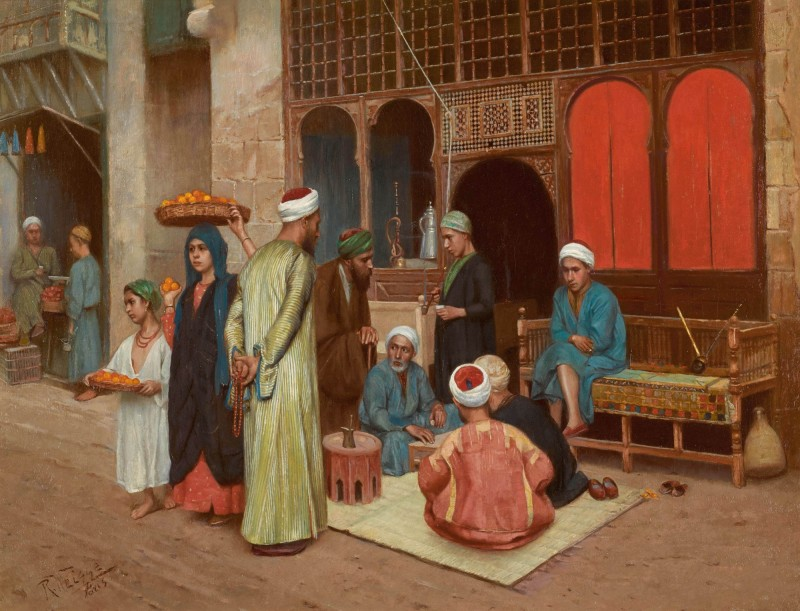
A painting from 1859 depicting patrons at a Cairo coffeehouse.

Modern Egyptian history is generally believed to begin with the French expedition in Egypt led by Napoleon Bonaparte in 1798. The French defeated a Mamluk era army at the Battle of the Pyramids, and soon they were able to seize control of the country.

The French occupation was short-lived, ending when British troops drove out the French in 1801. Its impact on the social and cultural fabric of Egyptian society, however, was tremendous. The Egyptians were deeply hostile to the French, whom they viewed as yet another foreign occupation to be resisted. At the same time, the French expedition introduced Egyptians to the ideals of the French Revolution which were to have a significant influence on their own self-perception and realization of modern independence.

When Napoleon invited the Egyptian ulama to head a French-supervised government in Egypt, for some, it awakened a sense of nationalism and a patriotic desire for national independence from the Ottomans. In addition, the French introduced the printing press in Egypt and published its first newspaper. The monumental catalogue of Egypt's ecology, society and economy, Description de l'Égypte, was written by scholars and scientists who accompanied the French army on their expedition.

The withdrawal of French forces from Egypt left a power vacuum that was filled after a period of political turmoil by Mohammed Ali, an Ottoman officer of Albanian ethnicity. He rallied support among the Egyptians until he was elected by the native Muslim ulama as governor of Egypt. Mohammed Ali is credited for having undertaken a massive campaign of public works, including irrigation projects, agricultural reforms and the cultivation of cash crops (notably cotton, rice and sugar-cane), increased industrialization, and a new educational system—the results of which are felt to this day.

In order to consolidate his power in Egypt, Mohammed Ali worked to eliminate the Turko-Circassian domination of administrative and army posts. For the first time since the Roman period, native Egyptians filled the junior ranks of the country's army. The army would later conduct military expeditions in the Levant, Sudan, and against the Wahabis in Arabia. Many Egyptians student missions were sent to Europe in the early 19th century to study at European universities and acquire technical skills such as printing, shipbuilding, and modern military techniques. One of these students, whose name was Rifa'a et-Tahtawi (1801–1873), was the first in a long line of Egyptian intellectuals that started the modern Egyptian Renaissance.

==== Nationalism ====
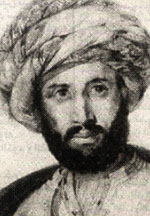
Rifa'a el-Tahtawi, 1801–1873, laid the groundwork for the modern Egyptian Renaissance.

The period between 1860 and 1940 was characterized by an Egyptian nahda, renaissance or rebirth. It is best known for the renewed interest in Egyptian antiquity and the cultural achievements that were inspired by it. Along with this interest came an indigenous, Egypt-centered orientation, particularly among the Egyptian intelligentsia that would affect Egypt's autonomous development as a sovereign and independent nation-state.

The first Egyptian renaissance intellectual was Rifa'a el-Tahtawi, who was born in the village of Tahta in upper Egypt. In 1831, Tahtawi undertook a career in journalism, education and translation. Three of his published volumes were works of political and moral philosophy. In them he introduces his students to Enlightenment ideas such as secular authority and political rights and liberty; his ideas regarding how a modern civilized society ought to be and what constituted by extension a civilized or "good Egyptian"; and his ideas on public interest and public good.

Tahtawi was instrumental in sparking indigenous interest in Egypt's ancient heritage. He composed a number of poems in praise of Egypt and wrote two other general histories of the country. He also co-founded with his contemporary Ali Mubarak, the architect of the modern Egyptian school system, a native Egyptology school that looked for inspiration to medieval Egyptian scholars like Suyuti and Maqrizi, who studied ancient Egyptian history, language and antiquities. Tahtawi encouraged his compatriots to invite Europeans to come and teach the modern sciences in Egypt, drawing on the example of Pharaoh Psamtek I who had enlisted the Greeks' help in organizing the Egyptian army.

Among Mohammed Ali's successors, the most influential was Isma'il Pasha who became khedive in 1863. Ismail's reign witnessed the growth of the army, major education reforms, the founding of the Egyptian Museum and the Royal Opera House, the rise of an independent political press, a flourishing of the arts, and the inauguration of the Suez Canal. In 1866, the Assembly of Delegates was founded to serve as an advisory body for the government. Its members were elected from across Egypt, including villages, which meant that native Egyptians came to exert increasing political and economic influence over their country. Several generations of Egyptians exposed to the ideas of constitutionalism made up the emerging intellectual and political milieu that slowly filled the ranks of the government, the army and institutions which had long been dominated by an aristocracy of Turks, Greeks, Circassians and Armenians.

Ismail's massive modernization campaign, however, left Egypt indebted to European powers, leading to increased European meddling in local affairs. This led to the formation of secret groups made up of Egyptian notables, ministers, journalists and army officers organized across the country to oppose the increasing European influence.

When the British deposed Ismail and installed his son Tawfik, the now Egyptian-dominated army reacted violently, staging a revolt led by Minister of War Ahmed Orabi, who was a rural Egyptian born in a village in Zagazig, self-styled el-Masri ('the Egyptian'), against the Khedive, the Turko-Circassian elite, and the European stronghold. The revolt was a military failure and British forces occupied Egypt in 1882. Technically, Egypt was still part of the Ottoman Empire with the Mohammed Ali family ruling the country, though now with British supervision and according to British directives. The Egyptian army was disbanded and a smaller army commanded by British officers was installed in its place.

==== Liberal age ====
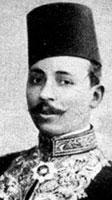
Mustafa Kamil (1874–1908), an anti-colonial nationalist famous for coining the phrase, "If I had not been an Egyptian, I would have wished to become one".

Egyptian self-government, education, and the continued plight of Egypt's peasant majority deteriorated most significantly under British occupation. Slowly, an organized national movement for independence began to form. In its beginnings, it took the form of an Azhar-led religious reform movement that was more concerned with the social conditions of Egyptian society. It gathered momentum between 1882 and 1906, ultimately leading to a resentment against European occupation.

Sheikh Muhammad Abduh, the son of a Delta farmer who was briefly exiled for his participation in the Orabi revolt and a future Azhar Mufti, was its most notable advocate. Abduh called for a reform of Egyptian Muslim society and formulated the modernist interpretations of Islam that took hold among younger generations of Egyptians. Among these were Mustafa Kamil and Ahmed Lutfi el-Sayed, the architects of modern Egyptian nationalism. Mustafa Kamil had been a student activist in the 1890s involved in the creation of a secret nationalist society that called for British evacuation from Egypt. He was famous for coining the popular expression, "If I had not been an Egyptian, I would have wished to become one."

Egyptian nationalist sentiment reached a high point after the 1906 Dinshaway Incident, when following an altercation between a group of British soldiers and Egyptian farmers, four of the farmers were hanged while others were condemned to public flogging. Dinshaway, a watershed in the history of Egyptian anti-colonial resistance, galvanized Egyptian opposition against the British, culminating in the founding of the first two political parties in Egypt: the secular, liberal Umma (the Nation, 1907) headed by Ahmed Lutfi el-Sayed, and the more radical, pro-Islamic Watani Party (National Party, 1908) headed by Mustafa Kamil. Lutfi was born to a family of farmers in a village in the Delta province of Daqahliya in 1872. He was educated at al-Azhar where he attended lectures by Mohammed Abduh. Abduh came to have a profound influence on Lutfi's reformist thinking in later years. In 1907, he founded the Umma Party newspaper, el-Garida, whose statement of purpose read: "El-Garida is a purely Egyptian party which aims to defend Egyptian interests of all kinds."

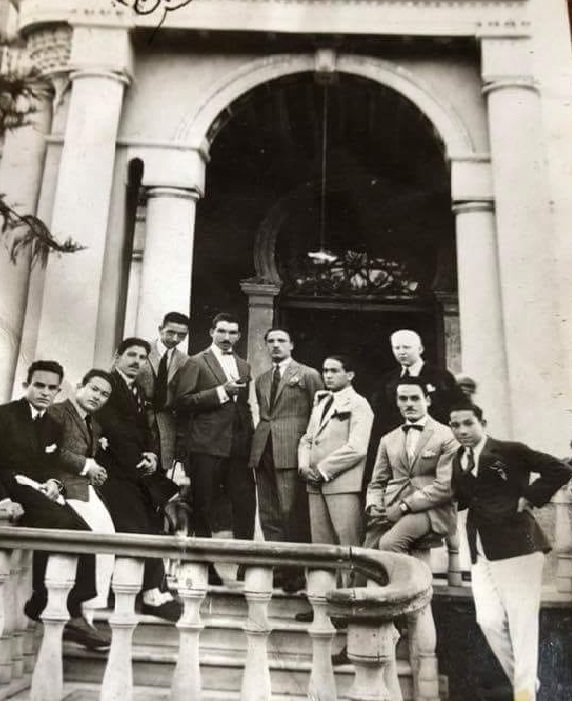
Members of the Abaza family, known for their significant social and political influence in Egypt, 1924

Both the People and National parties came to dominate Egyptian politics until World War I, but the new leaders of the national movement for independence following four arduous years of war (in which Great Britain declared Egypt a British protectorate) were closer to the secular, liberal principles of Ahmed Lutfi el-Sayed and the People's Party. Prominent among these was Saad Zaghloul who led the new movement through the Wafd Party. Saad Zaghloul was born in a small Egyptian village, he held several ministerial positions before he was elected to the Legislative Assembly and organized a mass movement demanding an end to the British Protectorate. He garnered such massive popularity among the Egyptian people that he came to be known as 'Father of the Egyptians'. When the British arrested Zaghloul and his associates on 8 March 1919 and exiled them to Malta, the Egyptian people staged their first modern revolution. Demonstrations and strikes across Egypt became such a daily occurrence that normal life was brought to a halt.

The Wafd Party drafted a new Constitution in 1923 based on a parliamentary representative system. Saad Zaghloul became the first popularly elected Prime Minister of Egypt in 1924. Egyptian independence at this stage was provisional, as British forces continued to be physically present on Egyptian soil. In 1936, the Anglo-Egyptian Treaty was concluded. New forces that came to prominence were the Muslim Brotherhood and the radical Young Egypt Party. In 1920, Banque Misr (Bank of Egypt) was founded by Talaat Pasha Harb as "an Egyptian bank for Egyptians only", which restricted shareholding to native Egyptians and helped finance various new Egyptian-owned businesses.

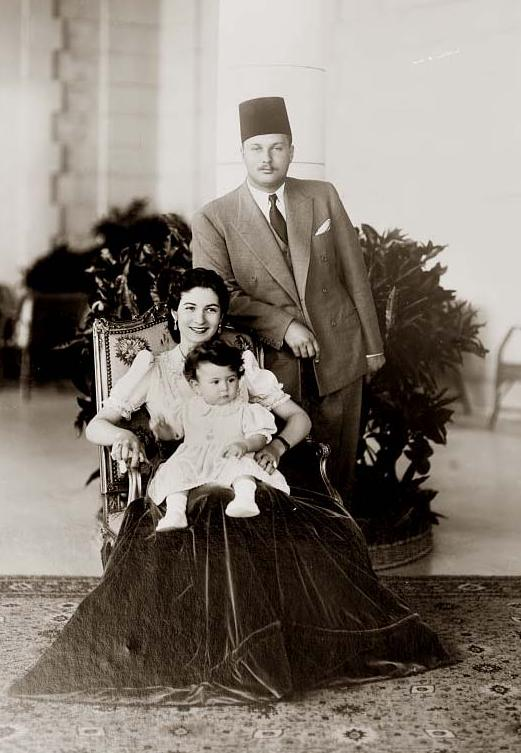
King Farouk I, Queen Farida and their first-born daughter Princess Ferial, c. 1940

Under the parliamentary monarchy, Egypt reached the peak of its modern intellectual Renaissance that was started by Rifa'a el-Tahtawi nearly a century earlier. Among those who set the intellectual tone of a newly independent Egypt, in addition to Muhammad Abduh and Ahmed Lutfi el-Sayed, were Qasim Amin, Muhammad Husayn Haykal, Taha Hussein, Abbas el-'Akkad, Tawfiq el-Hakeem, and Salama Moussa. They delineated a liberal outlook for their country expressed as a commitment to individual freedom, secularism, an evolutionary view of the world and faith in science to bring progress to human society.

When Egyptian novelist and Nobel Prize laureate Naguib Mahfouz died in 2006, many Egyptians felt that perhaps the last of the Greats of Egypt's golden age had died. In his dialogues with close associate and journalist Mohamed Salmawy, published as Mon Égypte, Mahfouz had this to say:

Egypt is not just a piece of land. Egypt is the inventor of civilization ... The strange thing is that this country of great history and unsurpassed civilization is nothing but a thin strip along the banks of the Nile ... This thin strip of land created moral values, launched the concept of monotheism, developed arts, invented science and gave the world a stunning administration. These factors enabled the Egyptians to survive while other cultures and nations withered and died ... Throughout history Egyptians have felt that their mission is to tend to life. They were proud to turn the land green, to make it blossom with life. The other thing is that Egyptians invented morality long before the major religions appeared on earth. Morality is not just a system for control but a protection against chaos and death ... Egypt gave Islam a new voice. It didn't change the basic tenets of Islam, but its cultural weight gave Islam a new voice, one it didn't have back in Arabia. Egypt embraced an Islam that was moderate, tolerant and non-extremist. Egyptians are very pious, but they know how to mix piety with joy, just as their ancestors did centuries ago. Egyptians celebrate religious occasions with flair. For them, religious festivals and the month of Ramadan are occasions to celebrate life.

==== Republic ====
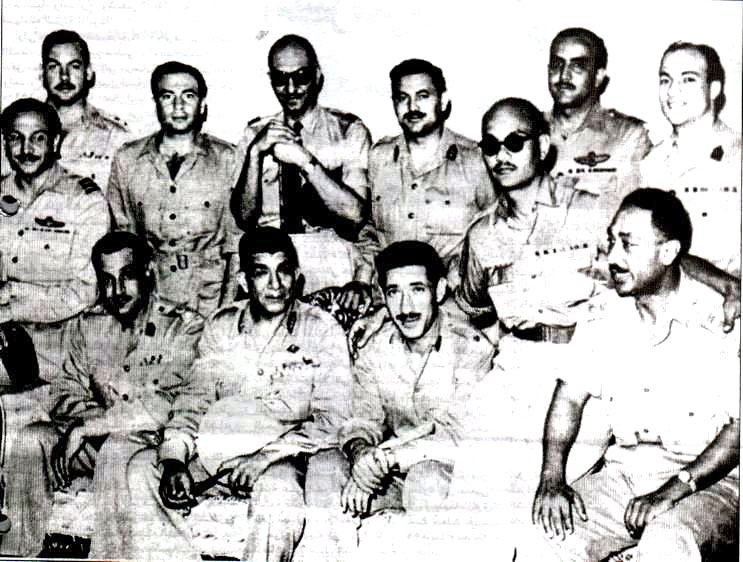
The Free Officers Movement overthrew the Egyptian monarchy. The bottom row from left to right includes Gamal Abdel Nasser, the movement's operational leader and Egypt's second president, Muhammad Naguib, Egypt's first president, Abdel Hakim Amer and Anwar Sadat, Egypt's third president.

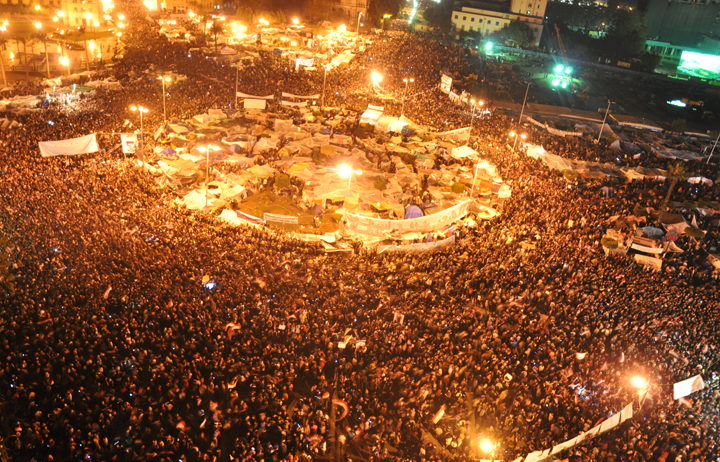
Over 2 million Egyptians protesting in Tahrir Square

Increased involvement by King Farouk in parliamentary affairs, government corruption, and the widening gap between the country's rich and poor led to the eventual toppling of the monarchy and the dissolution of the parliament through a coup d'état by a group of army officers in 1952. The Egyptian Republic was declared on 18 June 1953, with General Muhammad Naguib as the first President of the Republic. After Naguib was forced to resign in 1954 and later put under house arrest by Gamal Abdel Nasser, the real architect of the 1952 movement, mass protests by Egyptians erupted against the forced resignation of what became a popular symbol of the new regime.

Nasser assumed power as president and began a nationalization process that initially had profound effects on the socioeconomic strata of Egyptian society. According to one historian, "Egypt had, for the first time since 343 BC, been ruled not by a Macedonian Greek, nor a Roman, nor an Arab, nor a Turk, but by an Egyptian."

Nasser nationalized the Suez Canal leading to the 1956 Suez Crisis. Egypt became increasingly involved in regional affairs until three years after the 1967 Six-Day War, in which Egypt lost the Sinai to Israel, Nasser died and was succeeded by Anwar Sadat. Sadat revived an Egypt Above All orientation, switched Egypt's Cold War allegiance from the Soviet Union to the United States, expelling Soviet advisors in 1972, and launched the Infitah economic reform policy. Like his predecessor, he also clamped down on religious and leftist opposition alike.

Egyptians fought one last time in the 1973 October War in an attempt to liberate Egyptian territories captured by Israel six years earlier. The October War presented Sadat with a political victory that later allowed him to regain the Sinai. In 1977, Sadat made a historic visit to Israel leading to the signing of the 1978 peace treaty, which was supported by the vast majority of Egyptians, in exchange for the complete Israeli withdrawal from Sinai. Sadat was assassinated in Cairo by members of the Egyptian Islamic Jihad in 1981, and was succeeded by Hosni Mubarak.

Hosni Mubarak was the president from 14 October 1981 to 11 February 2011, when he resigned under pressure of popular protest. Although power was ostensibly organized under a multi-party semi-presidential system, in practice it rested almost solely with the president. In late February 2005, for the first time since the 1952 coup d'état, the Egyptian people had an apparent chance to elect a leader from a list of various candidates, most prominently Ayman Nour. Most Egyptians were skeptical about the process of democratization and feared that power might ultimately be transferred to the president's first son, Gamal Mubarak.

After the resignation of Hosni Mubarak presidential powers were transferred to the Supreme Council of the Armed Forces, who relinquished power on 30 June 2012 when Islamist candidate Mohamed Morsi became the first democratically elected head of state in Egyptian history. After mass protests, he was deposed by a military coup a year after he came to power, and subsequently arrested and sentenced to death (later overturned), and died in prison six years later. The Muslim Brotherhood (officially listed as a terrorist group by Egypt after the coup) claimed that his death was due to being "prevented medicine and poor food." Morsi was also charged with leading an outlawed group, detention and torture of anti-government protesters, and committing treason by leaking state secrets.

In the 26–28 May 2014 Egyptian presidential election, former General Abdel Fattah el-Sisi won in a landslide, capturing 97% of the vote according to the government. Some regarded the election as undemocratic claiming that several political opponents were being detained or banned from running, but: "The European Union's Election Observation Mission (EOM) released a preliminary statement on Thursday after voting commenced, stating that 'the Presidential Elections Commission (PEC) administered the election professionally and overall in line with the law'." In 2018 el-Sisi was re-elected with 97% of the vote, in an election denounced by human rights groups as unfair and "farcical". A BBC article mentioned that "Three potential candidates dropped out of the race, while a fourth – a former military chief – was arrested and accused of running for office without permission."

== Languages ==
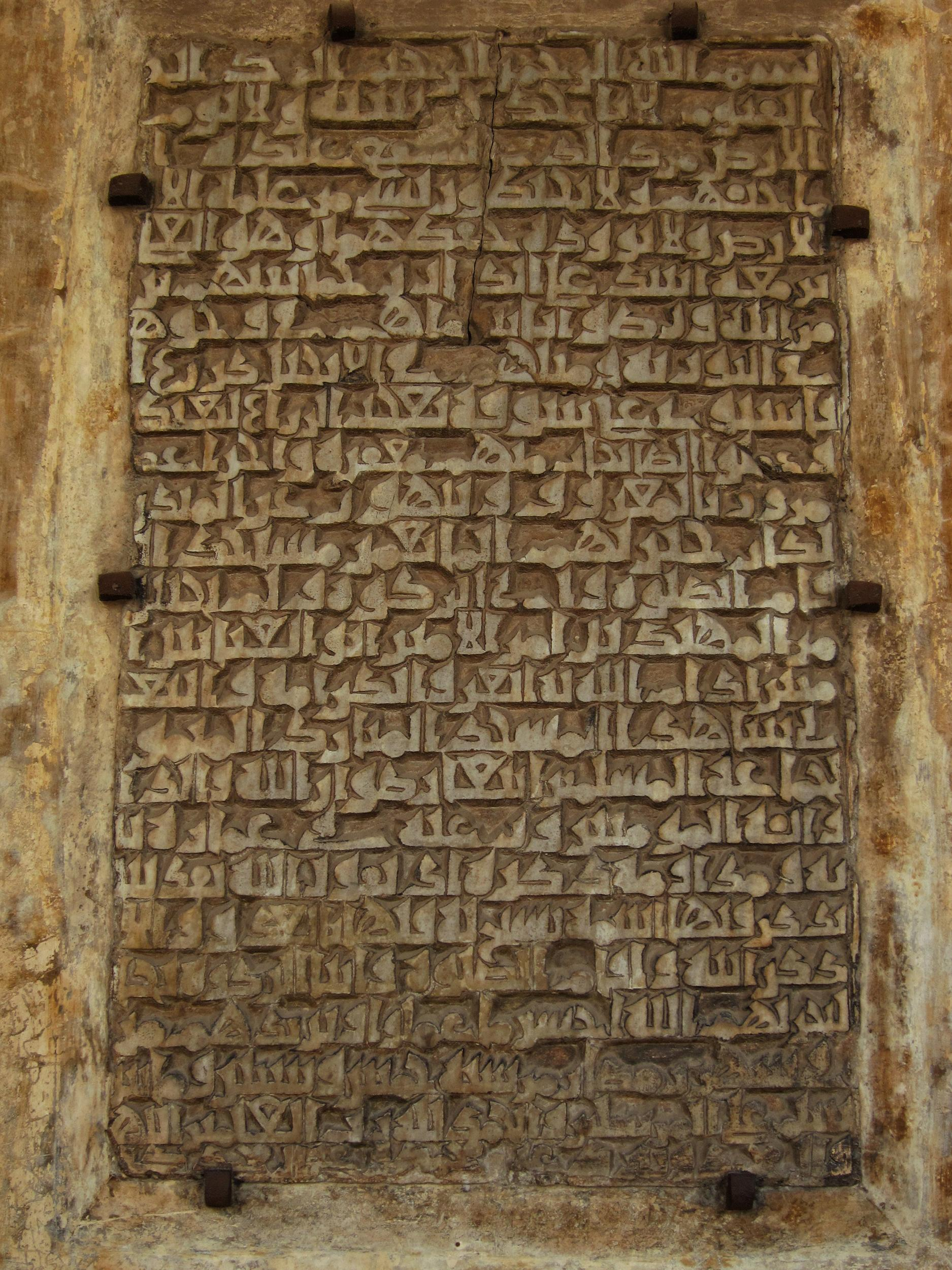
A 9th-century Arabic inscription on the Mosque of Ibn Tulun, one of the oldest mosques still standing in Egypt.

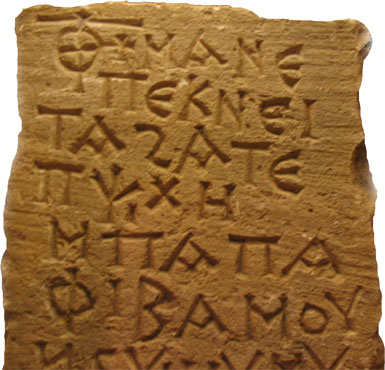
A 3rd-century Coptic inscription

In the Early Dynastic Period, Nile Valley Egyptians spoke the Archaic Egyptian language. In antiquity, Egyptians spoke the Egyptian language. It constitutes its own branch of the Afroasiatic family. The Coptic language is the last form of the Egyptian language, written in Coptic alphabet which is based on the Greek alphabet and 7 Egyptian Demotic letters. It is worth noting that other languages, such as Nubian, Arabic, and other Libyan languages also existed in Egypt outside of the Nile valley and in the mountains surrounding it since at least the time of Herodotus, with Arabic being used mainly in the Eastern Desert and Sinai, Nubian (referred to as Ethiopian By Herodotus) South of the first cataract of the Nile, and other Libyan Languages in the Libyan Desert

Although Arabic was spoken in parts of Egypt in the pre-Islamic era such as the Eastern Desert and Sinai, Coptic was the Language of the majority of Egyptians residing in the Nile Valley. Arabic was adopted by the rulers of Egypt after the Islamic invasion as an official language. Gradually, Egyptian Arabic came to replace Coptic as the spoken language. Spoken Coptic was mostly extinct by the 17th century but may have survived in isolated pockets in Upper Egypt as late as the 19th century.

The official language of Egypt today is Modern Standard Arabic, but it is not a spoken language. The spoken vernaculars are Egyptian Arabic, Saʽidi Arabic, and their variants; and also Bedawi Arabic in the Sinai, and Western Egyptian Arabic in the Western desert. The most prestigious and widely spread vernacular is known as Cairene Arabic, being spoken by about 50% of the population, and the second, less prestigious, being Saidi Arabic, spoken by about 35–40% of the population. Modern Standard Arabic is reserved only for official documents, written educational material, and more formal contexts, and is not a naturally spoken language.

The recorded history of Egyptian Arabic as a dialect begins in Ottoman Egypt with a document by the 17th-century Moroccan author Yusuf Al-Maghribi during after his travels to Egypt writing about the peculiarities of the speech of the Egyptian people دفع الإصر عن كلام أهل مصر Dafʻ al-ʼiṣr ʻan kalām ʼahl Miṣr (lit. "The Removal of the Burden from the Language of the People of Egypt") This suggests the language that by then was spoken in the majority of Miṣr (Egypt/Cairo). It's also worth noting that the Egyptians commonly referred to the modern day area of Greater Cairo (Cairo, Fustat, Giza, and their surroundings) by the name of "Miṣr", which was also the name used to refer to the entire land of Egypt. As a consequence, and because of the Egyptian habit of identifying people in the capital with the entire country's name, the word Miṣriyeen (Egyptian Arabic: Masreyeen) which is derived from the Quranic term Miṣr, the Hebrew Bible term Mitzrayim, and the Ancient Amarna tablets term Misri (lit. Land of Egypt) and Assyrian records called Egypt Mu-ṣur., commonly referred to the people of Egypt's Capital City, the greater Cairo area. It is represented in a body of vernacular literature comprising novels, plays and poetry published over the course of the nineteenth and twentieth centuries. Classical Arabic is also significant in Egyptian literary works, as Egyptian novelists and poets were among the first to experiment with modern styles of Arabic literature, and the forms they developed have been widely imitated.

While Egyptian Arabic is considered derived from the formal Arabic language, it has also been influenced by many other languages such as French, Turkish, and Italian. This is widely thought to be the effects of being the victim of several invasions, including that of the Ottoman Empire as well as the French invasion. As each invasion came and went, the Egyptians kept the few words and phrases that made the language seem easier. Egyptian Arabic is also influenced by Greek, and its grammar structure is influenced by the Coptic stage of the ancient Egyptian language.

It is also noteworthy that the Egyptian dialect is the most understood throughout the Arabic-speaking countries. This is because Egyptian movies and Egyptian music have been the most influential in the region and are therefore the most widespread, and also because of the political and cultural influence Egypt has on the region. As a result, most of the countries in the region have grown up listening to Egyptian Arabic and therefore have no trouble understanding it, even though they actually speak their own, but they tend to adopt many elements of Egyptian Arabic. This situation is not reciprocal, however, meaning that the Egyptians do not understand any of the dialects of the region.

Originally the Egyptians wrote in hieroglyphics. At first the meaning of the hieroglyphics was unknown, until in the year 1799 Napoleón Bonaparte's soldiers dug up the Rosetta stone. The Rosetta Stone was found broken and incomplete. It features 14 lines in the hieroglyphic script, 32 lines in Demotic, and 53 lines in Ancient Greek. Its decipherment lead to the understanding of the ancient Egyptian language.

== Identity ==
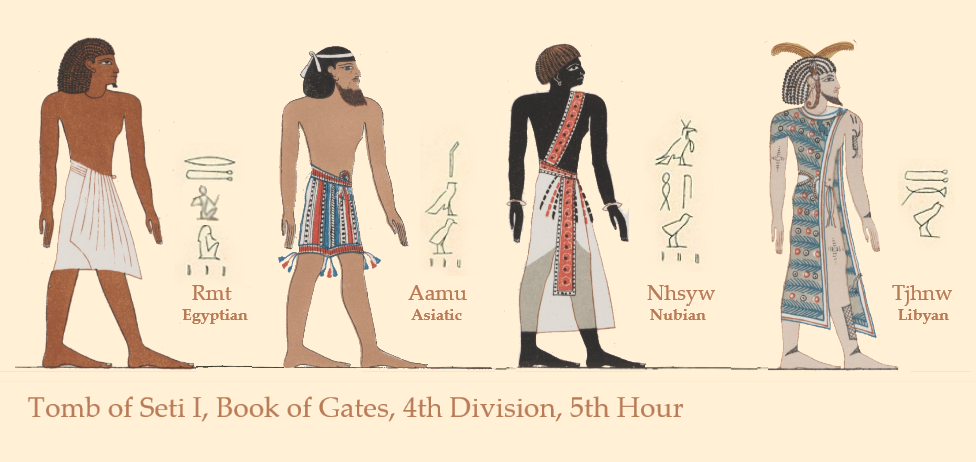
Illustration of figures from The Fourth Division of the Fifth Hour at the Tomb of Seti I depicting: an Egyptian, Asiatic, Nubian and Libyan.

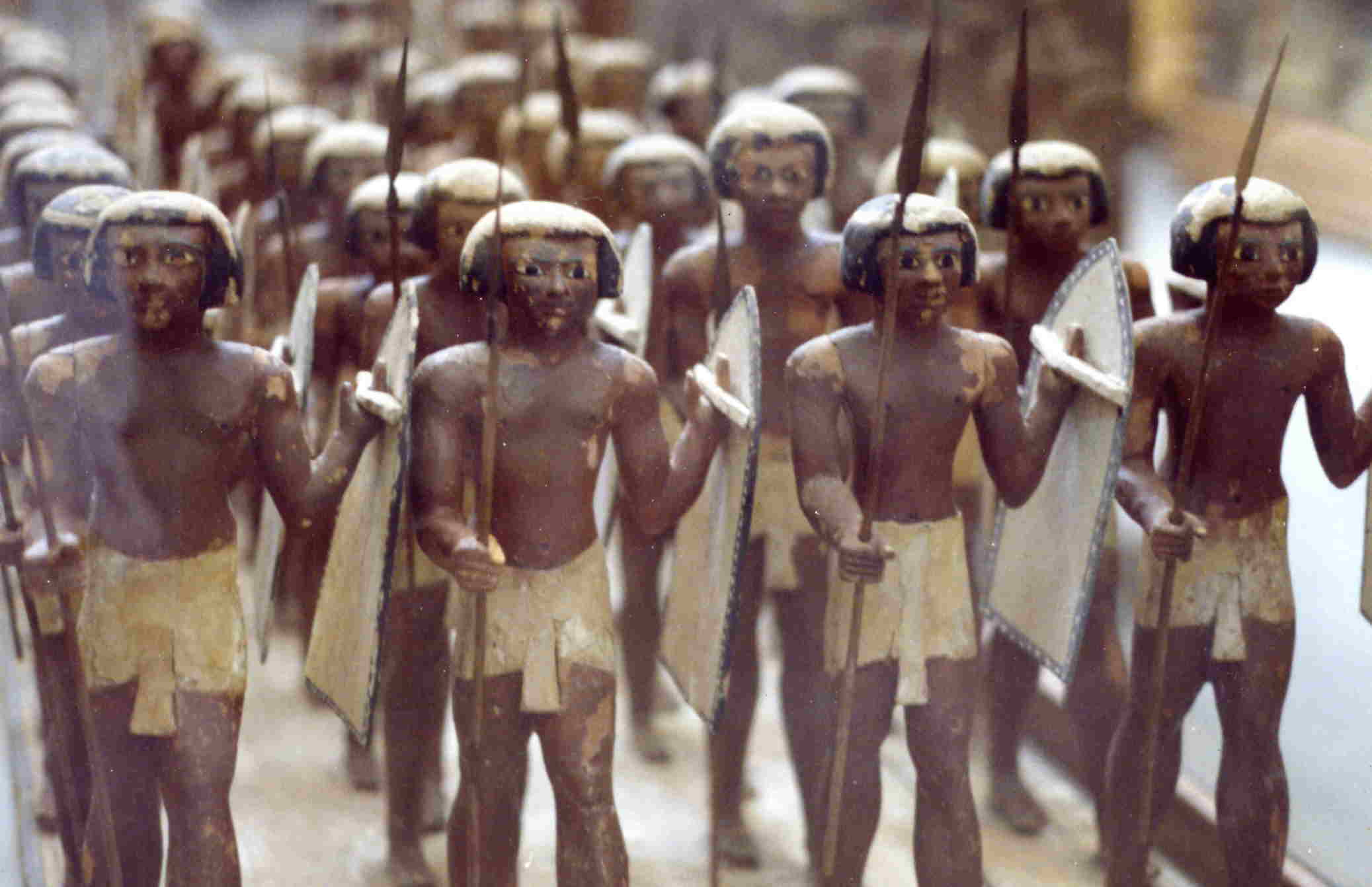
11th Dynasty model of Egyptian soldiers from the tomb of Mesehti, Upper Egypt

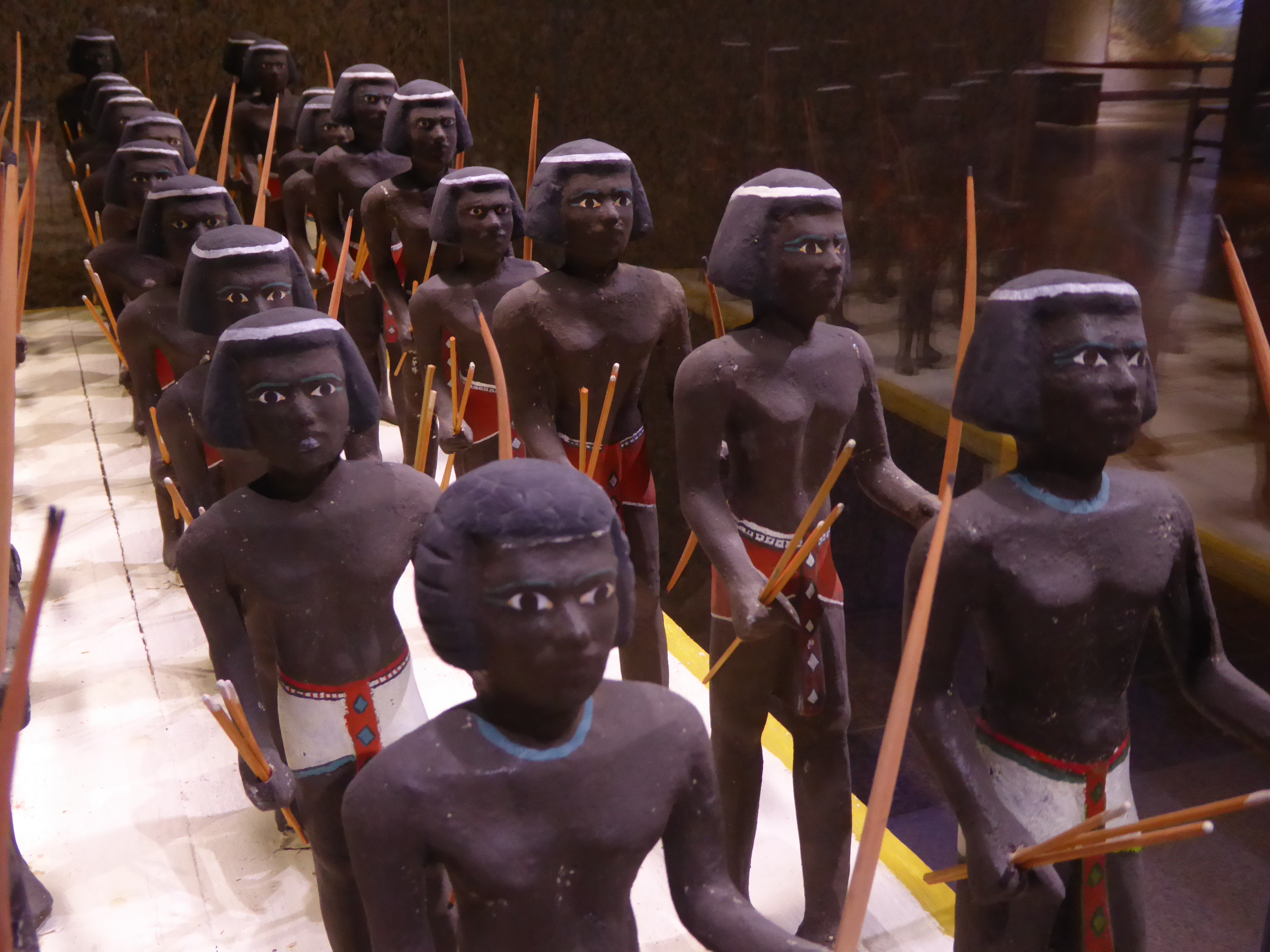
11th Dynasty model of Nubian archers from a tomb in Asyut, Upper Egypt

=== Antiquity ===
In a renowned part of the Book of Gates is a passage detailing the various races of man, as recognized by ancient Egyptians. They classified people into four groups: Egyptians (Remetu), Asiatics (Aamu), Nubians (Nehsey) and Libyans (Themehu). The text portrays each of these groups as welcomed into the afterlife, illustrating all four journeying together through its realms.

Some scholars have argued that Ancient Egyptians shared cultural connections and origins with the Land of Punt. This has been attributed to the Egyptian textual descriptions of Puntland as Ta Nejter which translates into "God's Land", along with comparable paintings which depicted Puntites in reddish-brown skin complexions similar to their Egyptian counterparts.

=== Medieval Egypt ===
Following the Islamic expansion, Egyptian Muslims ceased to be identified as "Copts," a term that thereafter became exclusive to Egypt's Christian minority and the Coptic Church. Over time, the Muslim majority came to identify as Arabs, adopting Arabic as their primary language.

During her stay in Upper Egypt, Lucie, Lady Duff-Gordon recorded the grievances of an Upper Egyptian man regarding the Ahmad al-Tayyib Uprising, quoting him as saying: "Truly, in all the world, none are as miserable as us Arabs. The Turks beat us, and the Europeans hate us, and rightly so. By God, we had better lay down our heads in the dust [die] and let the strangers take our land and grow cotton for themselves."

Similarly, Ibrahim Pasha of Egypt, son of Muhammad Ali Pasha, distanced himself from Turkish identity despite his Albanian origins. When criticized for his remarks about the Turks, he reportedly declared: "I am not a Turk. I came to Egypt as a child, and since then, its sun has changed my blood, I have become fully Arab."

=== Early modern period ===
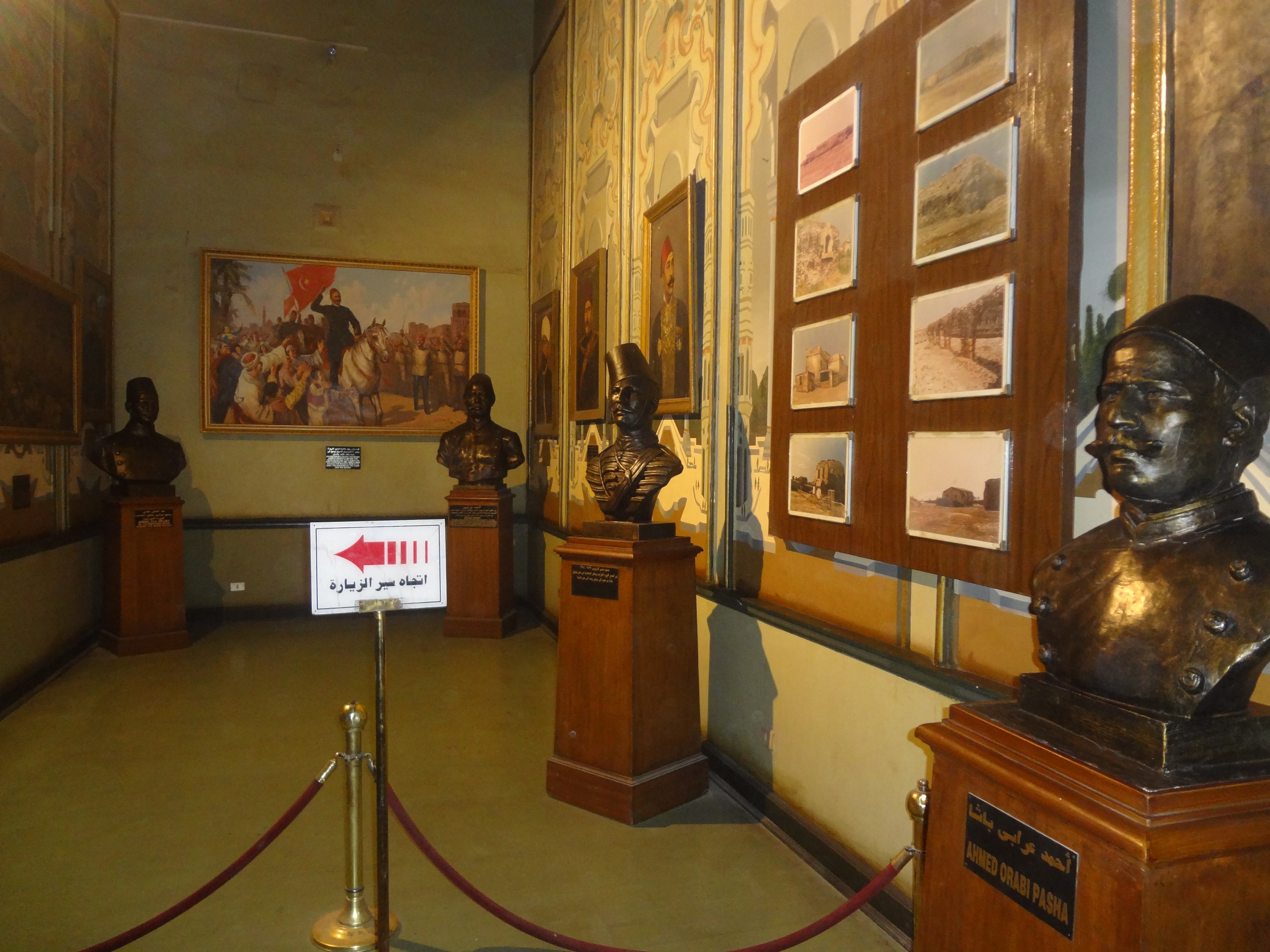
Section dedicated to Ahmed Orabi in the Egyptian National Military Museum

By the late 19th and early 20th centuries, the state began efforts to shape a collective Egyptian identity and promote Egyptian nationalism in response to British rule. The revolution led by Ahmed Orabi has been described as a significant moment in Egyptian history, as it mobilized nationalist sentiment and emphasized an exclusive Egyptian identity. Historically, Egyptians have also referred to the area of Greater Cairo as "Masr", which was also used to denote the entire land of Egypt. As a result, and given the common practice of identifying people by their city names, the term "Misreyeen/Masreyeen" sometimes specifically referred to the inhabitants of Greater Cairo.

The Orabi movement in the 1870s and 1880s was one of the earliest major Egyptian nationalist movements. It opposed what was perceived as the despotism of the Muhammad Ali family and sought to curb European influence in Egypt. The movement adopted the nationalist slogan "Egypt for Egyptians". The Orabi revolt is often referred to in Egypt as the revolt of the fellahin (rural Egyptians), as Ahmed Orabi himself came from a rural background in Zagazig.

Following the French campaign in Egypt, Western ideas gained traction among Egyptian intellectuals, a trend that continued under British occupation. Among these ideas, the French Enlightenment concept of reviving pre-Christian civilizations and cultures particularly resonated with Egyptian nationalists, who emphasized Egypt's ancient Egyptian heritage as a defining cultural identity. Debates on identity intensified in the late 19th and 20th centuries, particularly in the context of anti-colonial struggles, leading to the rise of ethno-territorial Egyptian nationalism, often referred to as "Pharaonism." Following independence from Britain, previously marginalized political ideologies, such as pan-Arabism, gained prominence in state discourse, alongside a growing influence of Islamism.

"Pharaonism" emerged as a dominant ideological force in the 1920s and 1930s, shaping Egypt's resistance to British occupation. A segment of Egyptian intellectuals argued that Egypt's historical and cultural trajectory was distinct from the Arab world, and some linked Egyptian identity more closely to a Mediterranean civilization. This perspective drew from Egypt's pre-Islamic, pre-Arab history, the geographical isolation of the Nile Valley, and the relatively homogenous indigenous ancestry of its population, regardless of religious affiliation. One of Pharaonism's most notable advocates, Taha Hussein, expressed this view in the following terms:

Pharaonism is deeply rooted in the spirits of the Egyptians. It will remain so, and it must continue and become stronger. The Egyptian is Pharaonic before being Arab. Egypt must not be asked to deny its Pharaonism because that would mean: Egypt, destroy your Sphinx and your pyramids, forget who you are and follow us! Do not ask of Egypt more than it can offer. Egypt will never become part of some Arab unity, whether the capital [of this unity] were to be Cairo, Damascus, or Baghdad.

Pharaonism played a significant role in shaping Egyptian anti-colonial discourse during the pre-war and interwar periods. Following a visit to Egypt in 1931, Syrian Arab nationalist Sati' al-Husri observed:

[Egyptians] did not possess an Arab nationalist sentiment; did not accept that Egypt was a part of the Arab lands, and would not acknowledge that the Egyptian people were part of the Arab nation.

During the late 1930s, Arab nationalism developed largely outside of Egypt, with its ideological foundations laid by Syrian, Palestinian, and Lebanese intellectuals.

Arab-Islamic political sentiment in Egypt gained momentum through solidarity with other anti-imperialist struggles in the Arab world. The rise of Zionism in neighboring Palestine was perceived as a significant political issue, prompting support from Egyptian political and religious movements. Groups such as the Muslim Brotherhood and figures including King Faruq I and Prime Minister Mustafa el-Nahhas became increasingly involved in regional affairs.

Historian H. S. Deighton remarked on the prevailing sentiment in early 20th-century Egypt:

The Egyptians are not Arabs, and both they and the Arabs are aware of this fact. They are Arabic-speaking, and they are Muslim... But the Egyptian, during the first thirty years of the [twentieth] century, was not aware of any particular bond with the Arab East... Egypt sees in the Arab cause a worthy object of real and active sympathy and, at the same time, a great and proper opportunity for the exercise of leadership, as well as for the enjoyment of its fruits. But she is still Egyptian first and Arab only in consequence, and her main interests are still domestic.

Until the 1940s, Egyptian nationalism was largely territorial in nature, and pan-Arabism did not hold significant influence in mainstream Egyptian identity. Egyptians generally did not identify as Arabs, and this distinction was evident in diplomatic interactions. When nationalist leader Saad Zaghlul met with Arab delegates at Versailles in 1918, he asserted that Egypt's political struggle was separate from those of the broader Arab world.

=== Contemporary ===
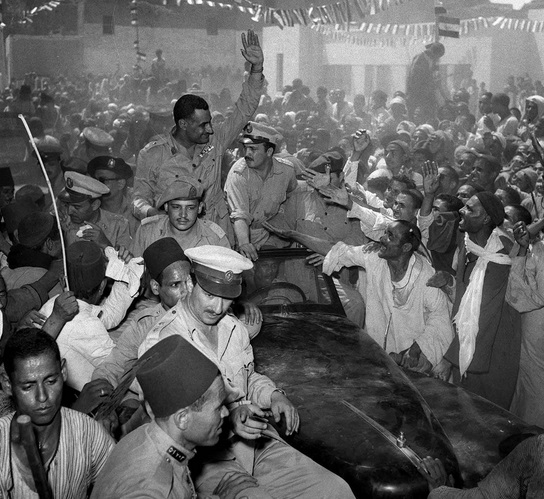
Gamal Abdel Nasser greeting crowds in Minya.

It was not until the Nasser era, more than a decade later, that Arab nationalism, and by extension, Arab socialism, became state policy, shaping Egypt's regional and global positioning. Nasser framed this ideology primarily in opposition to Zionism in the newly established state of Israel, believing that all Arab nations were engaged in anti-imperialist struggles and that solidarity was essential for independence. He viewed the earlier nationalist movement led by Saad Zaghloul as overly insular and saw no contradiction between Egyptian patriotism (wataniyya) and Arab nationalism (qawmiyya).

Egypt briefly united with Syria to form the United Arab Republic (UAR), a political entity that lasted for only three years. Even after its dissolution, Egypt retained the UAR name until 1971, when it officially became the Arab Republic of Egypt. However, the enthusiasm for Arabism began to wane following Egypt's devastating defeat in the 1967 Six-Day War. Disillusionment with Arab nationalist politics deepened as thousands of Egyptians lost their lives, leading many to question the pan-Arab ideology. Despite this, Nasser's brand of pan-Arabism left a lasting legacy, establishing Egypt as the self-proclaimed leader of the Arab world. His vision of Arab unity placed Egyptian sovereignty at the forefront, distinguishing it from the Eastern Arab states' aspirations.

Nasser's successor, Anwar el-Sadat, distanced Egypt from Arab nationalism, both through domestic policies and his diplomatic overtures toward the West. He reasserted an unequivocal Egyptian identity, making it clear that his primary concern was Egypt and Egyptians. As a result, the rhetoric of "Arabism" and "Arab unity" largely disappeared from state discourse, apart from the country's official name. (See also Liberal age and Republic sections.) Nevertheless, Arab nationalism remained a potent ideological force in Egypt.

In 1978, Egyptian-American sociologist Saad Eddin Ibrahim conducted a study on national discourse among 17 Egyptian intellectuals regarding Egypt's identity and its peace negotiations with Israel. Of the 18 articles he reviewed, the majority acknowledged Egypt's Arab identity and opposed neutrality in the conflict. Eight articles acknowledged Arab identity but endorsed neutrality, while only three, authored by Louis Awad, explicitly rejected Arab identity and supported neutrality. Egyptian scholar Gamal Hamdan emphasized the uniqueness of Egypt's identity while simultaneously reaffirming its role as the "cultural hub" of the Arab world, famously stating, "Egypt in the Arab world is like Cairo in Egypt." He further argued, "We do not see the Egyptian personality, no matter how distinct it may be, as anything other than a part of the personality of the greater Arab homeland."

Today, perspectives on Egypt's identity remain divided. Many Egyptians see their national and Arab identities as inseparable, highlighting Egypt's central role in the Arab world. Others reject Arab affiliation, emphasizing Egypt's indigenous heritage, cultural distinctiveness, and sovereign political tradition, often pointing to the failures of pan-Arabist policies. Egyptian anthropologist Laila el-Hamamsy captured this tension, remarking: "In light of their history, Egyptians ... should be conscious of their national identity and consider themselves, above all, Egyptians. How is the Egyptian, with this strong sense of Egyptian identity, able to see himself as an Arab too?" She explained that over time, Egyptian nationalism evolved into Arab nationalism, arguing that "an increased tempo of Arabization" occurred as linguistic fluency in Arabic facilitated access to the broader Arab cultural heritage. "Thus, in seeking a cultural identity, Egypt has revived its Arab cultural heritage."

==== Egypt and Africa ====
Although Egypt is geographically situated in North Africa, Egyptian national identity does not generally emphasize an affiliation with the broader African continent. Instead, Egypt is often regarded as part of the Arab world, with national and cultural narratives frequently emphasizing connections to the Middle East and the broader Arab identity rather than a continental African one.

== Culture ==
Egyptian culture boasts five millennia of recorded history. Ancient Egypt was among the earliest and greatest civilizations during which the Egyptians maintained a strikingly complex and stable culture that influenced later cultures of Europe, the Near East and Africa. After the period generally recognized as ancient Egypt, the Egyptians themselves came under the influence of Greco-Roman and Arab culture. Today, many aspects of ancient Egyptian culture exist in interaction with newer elements, including the influence of modern Western culture.

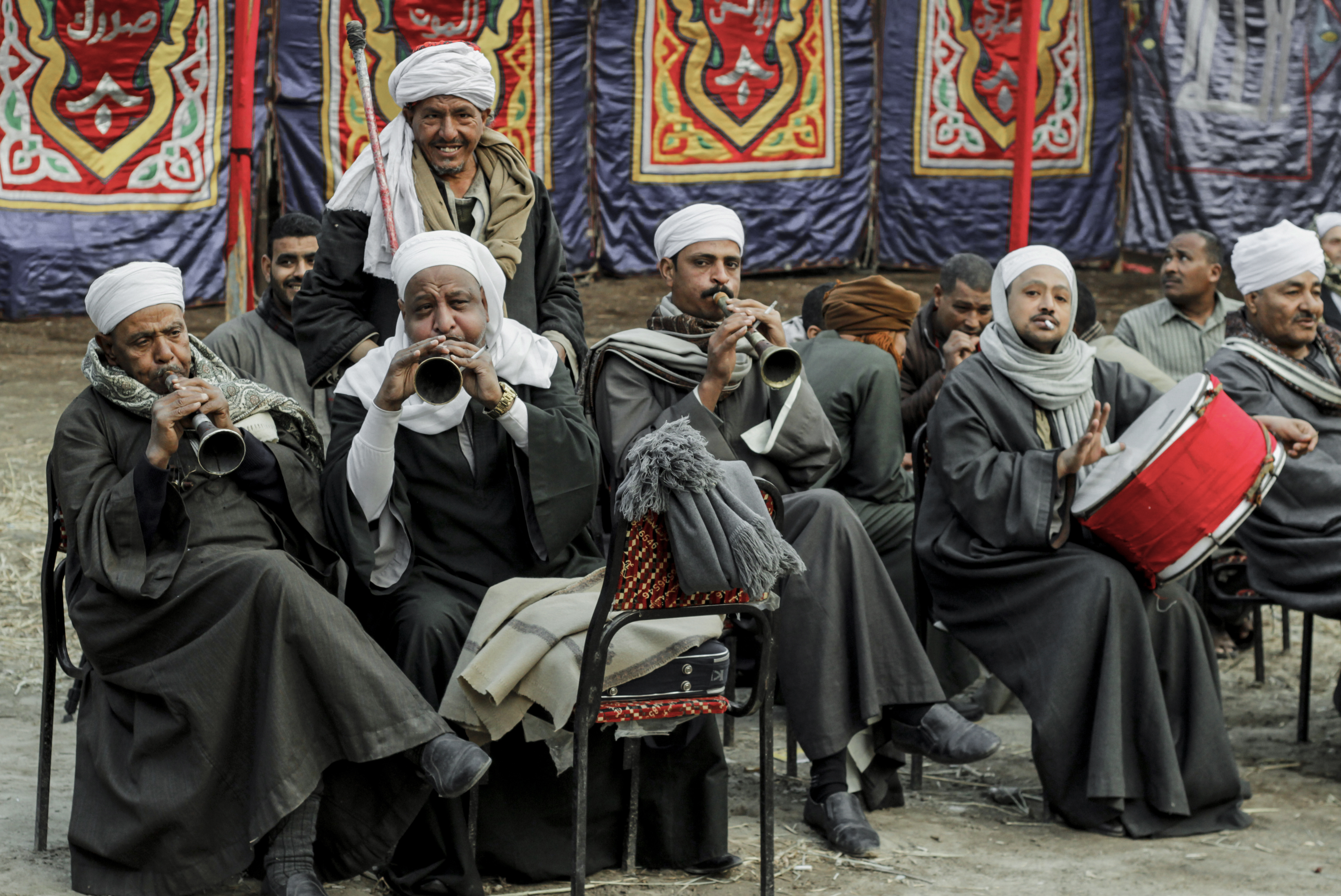
Egyptian musicians from Upper Egypt

Egyptian culture demonstrates a remarkable continuity of beliefs, customs, and daily practices from ancient times to the present, despite successive waves of conquest and religious transformation. Many contemporary Egyptian traditions, particularly in rural areas, retain forms and meanings rooted in ancient Egypt. Examples include funeral rites, symbolic gestures of mourning, and daily rituals such as bread- and beer-making (e.g. sun-leavened bread and bouza respectively) as well as food preservation methods, continuing techniques that date back millennia.

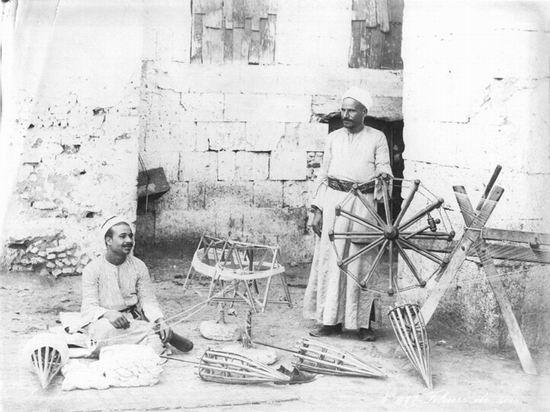
Egyptian silk weavers, 1880s

Visual and ritual parallels can be observed between modern life and scenes from pharaonic tombs, including domestic behaviors, food customs, and expressions of grief. The Egyptian dialect itself contains words and grammatical structures inherited from the ancient Egyptian language, passed down through Coptic and blended with Arabic.

Religious and cultural shifts, from ancient Egyptian polytheism to Christianity and later Islam, did not erase older cultural frameworks. Instead, ancient beliefs were absorbed and reformulated: Isis, the goddess of motherhood and sacrifice, was reimagined as the Virgin Mary or Sayyida Zaynab; funerary customs persisted beneath Islamic and Christian forms. Even in destructive acts against ancient monuments, such as defacing statues during early Christian iconoclasm, continuity is evident in the use of inherited cultural logic (e.g., mutilating eyes and noses to "kill" the image).

Throughout history, new foreign rulers encountered an enduring cultural foundation that adapted but did not disappear. Despite modern ideological attempts, whether Arab nationalism or religious movements, to dissociate from Egypt's ancient past, periods of national revival often saw a return to ancient Egyptian aesthetics and concepts, such as in Mamluk architecture or the Nahda of the early 20th century. Egyptian cultural identity has thus remained fundamentally consistent beneath layers of religious, political, and linguistic change.

== Surnames ==
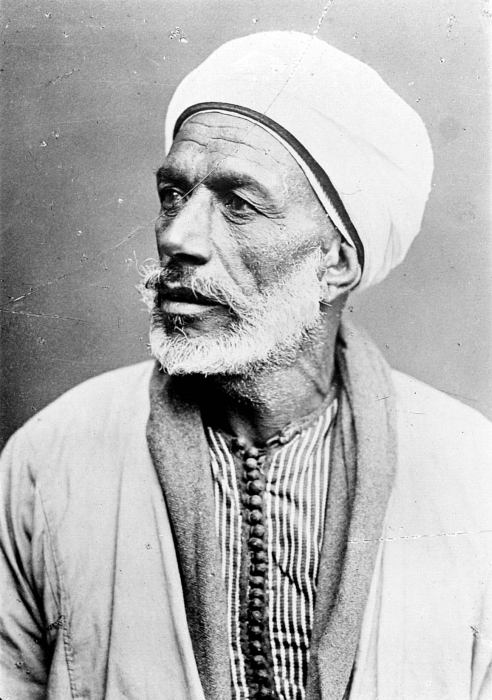
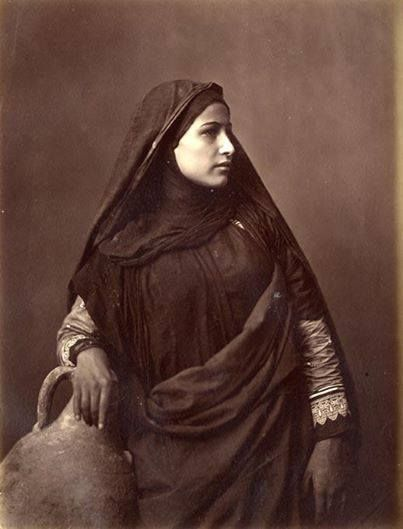
An Egyptian man (left) and woman (right), 1870s

Today, Egyptians carry names that have ancient Egyptian, Arabic, Turkish and Western meanings, the latter being particularly common among Christians. Egyptian surnames are predominantly appellative in nature, often functioning as descriptive identifiers that denote things like geographic origin, occupational affiliation or lineage. In Egypt, the concept of a fixed, inherited surname in the Western sense is not universally applied. Instead, Egyptians typically follow a patronymic naming convention in which a person's full legal name comprises their given name, followed by their father's name, their grandfather's, and sometimes their great-grandfather's, finally the family name if there is one. This sequence may extend for several generations, but in practice, it is often truncated after the third or fourth name. The last name in this shortened sequence is commonly treated as a surname in official or social contexts, even though it does not always denote a hereditary family name.

With the spread of Christianity and later Islam, Egyptians began adopting names associated with these faiths. Over time, many Egyptian names also underwent Hellenization and Arabization, meaning they were modified to conform to Greek or Arabic linguistic patterns. For instance, during the Greco-Roman period, Egyptian names were often given the Greek suffix -ios, transforming Pakhom into Pakhomios. Later, with the spread of Arabic names were Arabized, adapting to the phonetic and linguistic structure of Arabic. A notable aspect of this Arabization is the transformation of the Egyptian masculine possessive pronoun pa (meaning "the" or "of the"), which appears at the beginning of many names with Coptic meanings. Since Arabic lacks the phoneme /p/, pa was typically rendered as ba. As a result, names such as Pakhom became Bakhoum in their Arabicized form.

Many Egyptian family names are derived from geographic origins, often reflecting a person's ancestral hometown or region. Examples include Minyawi from Minya and Suyuti from Asyut. This naming pattern is widespread, with surnames such as Monoufi (from Monufia), Banhawy (from Benha), Aswany (from Aswan), Tahtawy (from Tahta), Fayoumi (from Fayoum), Eskandarani (from Alexandria), and Sohagi (from Sohag). These names may appear with or without the definite article El (e.g., El Minyawi, El Aswany). Few people might also have surnames like El Shamy ("the Levantine"), suggesting a possible Levantine origin, or, in the upper classes, Dewidar, suggesting a possible Ottoman-Mamluk origin. Conversely, some Levantines might carry the surname El Masri ("the Egyptian").

Some Egyptian family names stem from affiliation with local Sufi orders, such as El Shazly and El Sawy, while others originate from traditional professions or crafts. Examples include El Naggar (the carpenter), El Fawwal (a seller of foul), El Dabbah (the butcher), El Haddad (the blacksmith), and El Khayyat (the tailor). These names may also appear with or without the definite article (e.g., Naggar or El Naggar).

It is not unusual for Egyptian families to have names of Coptic origin, with ones related to ancient Egyptian deities being particularly common among Christians. Many of these names have first names or surnames beginning with the Egyptian masculine possessive pronoun pa, rendered as ba in the Arabic context, which lost the phoneme /p/ during its evolution from Proto-Semitic. For example, Bashandy (Coptic: ⲡⲁϣⲟⲛϯ "the one of acacia"), Bayoumi (Coptic: Ⲡⲁⲓⲟⲙ "the one of the sea"), Bakhoum (Coptic: ⲡⲁϧⲱⲙ "the one of an eagle"), Bekhit (Coptic: ⲡⲁϧⲏⲧ "the one of the north"), Bahur (Coptic: ⲡⲁϩⲱⲣ "the one of Horus"), Abanoub (Coptic: ⲁⲡⲁⲛⲟⲩⲃ "father of gold"). Names starting with the Egyptian affix pu ("of the place of") were sometimes Arabized to abu ("father of"); for example, Busiri ("of the place of Osiris") occasionally became Abusir and El Busiri. The name Shenouda (Coptic: ϣⲉⲛⲟⲩϯ), which is very common among Copts, means "child of God". Hence, both names and many toponyms may end with a Coptic form of the word for "God", such as -nouda, -noudi, or -nuti. A notable example, found among Muslim Egyptians, is the surname Abnudi, meaning "of God" in Coptic, often appearing with the Arabic definite article El prefixed to the name (El Abnudi).

Some Egyptians bear surnames that trace back to Arab tribes. For example, El Juhaini originates from the Arab tribe of Juhaynah. Such tribal surnames are relatively uncommon in Egypt, as it is not a tribal society; they are more frequently found among Bedouins. In some cases, these names may have been historically adopted as status markers, similar to how, during the Greco-Roman period, certain Egyptians took on Greek names.

== Genetic studies ==
=== Autosomal DNA ===
Mohamed, T et al. (2009) in their study of nomadic Bedouins from Kuwait featured a comparative study with a worldwide population database and a sample size of 153 Bedouin males. Their analysis discovered that both Muslim Egyptians and Coptic Christians showed a distinct North African cluster at 65%. This is their predominant ancestral component, and unique to the geographic region of Egypt.

In a 2019 study that analyzed the autosomal make-up of 21 modern North African genomes and other populations using Ancient DNA reference populations, this sample of Egyptian genomes were found to share more affinity with Middle Eastern populations compared to other North Africans. Egyptians carry more of the Caucasus hunter gatherer / Iran Neolithic component compared to other North Africans, more of the Natufian related component and less of the Iberomaurusian related component than other North Africans, and also less of the Steppe / European hunter gatherer component, consistent with Egypt's geographical proximity to southwest Asia.

=== Maternal lineages ===
mtDNA haplogroups of Egypt
1. R0 (17.3%)
2. L3 (12.3%)
3. T (9.40%)
4. U (9.00%)
5. J (7.20%)
6. M (6.90%)
7. HV (5.80%)
8. N (5.10%)
9. R (4.70%)
10. K (4.70%)
11. L2 (3.60%)
12. H (3.60%)
13. I (3.20%)
14. L1 (2.50%)
15. L0 (2.20%)
16. X (1.40%)
17. W (0.70%)
18. JT (0.40%)

In 2009 mitochondrial data was sequenced for 277 unrelated Egyptian individuals by Jessica L Saunier et al. in the journal Forensic Science International, as follows.

- R0 and its subgroups (31.4%)
- L3 (12.3%); and Asian origin (n = 33)

including M (6.9%)

- T (9.4%)
- U (9.0%)
- J (7.6%)
- N (5.1%)
- K (4.7%)
- L2 (3.6%)
- L1 (2.5%)
- I (3.2%)
- W (0.7%)
- X (1.4%); African origin (n = 57) including L0 (2.2%)

=== Paternal lineages ===
Y DNA Haplogroups of Egypt
1. Haplogroup J-M267 (20.8%)
2. Haplogroup E-V68 (14.9%)
3. Haplogroup E-Z827 (11.9%)
4. Haplogroup E-V12 (7.03%)
5. Haplogroup E-M123 (6.76%)
6. Haplogroup J-M172 (6.75%)
7. Haplogroup T-M184 (6.22%)
8. Haplogroup R1b (5.94%)
9. Haplogroup G-M201 (5.68%)
10. Haplogroup E-M35 (3.24%)
11. Haplogroup E-P2 (2.43%)
12. Haplogroup R1a (2.16%)
13. Haplogroup A (Y-DNA) (1.35%)
14. Haplogroup F-M89 (1.08%)
15. Haplogroup L-M20 (0.81%)
16. Haplogroup E-M132 (0.54%)
17. Haplogroup I-M170 (0.54%)
18. Haplogroup P (Y-DNA), Haplogroup R (Y-DNA) (0.54%)
19. Haplogroup R2 (0.54%)
20. Haplogroup K-M9 (0.27%)
21. Haplogroup O-M175 (0.27%)
22. Haplogroup Q-M242 (0.27%)
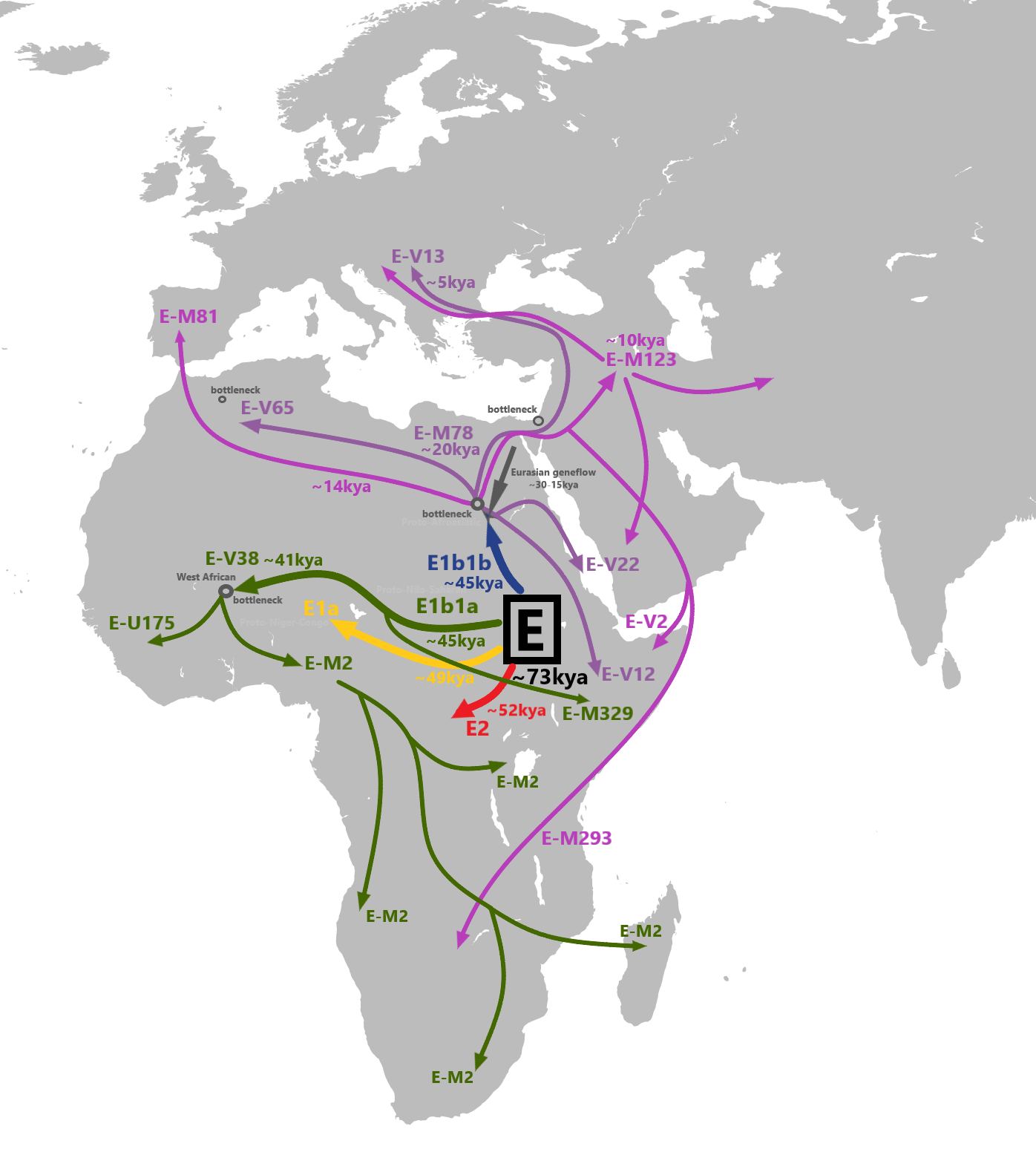
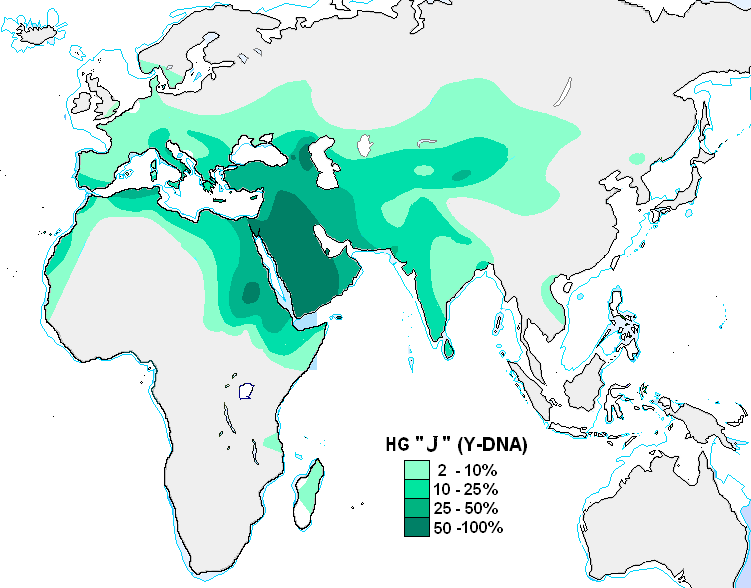
Two haplogroups, E1b1b and J, that are carried by both ancient and modern Egyptians. The subclade E-M78 of E1b1b is suggested to have originated in Northeast Africa in the area of Egypt and Libya, and is more predominant in Egypt. These two haplogroups and their various subclades in general are distributed in high frequencies in the Middle East and North Africa.

A study by Arredi et al., which analyzed 275 samples from five populations in Algeria, Tunisia, and Egypt, as well as published data from Moroccan populations, suggested that the North African pattern of Y-chromosomal variation, including in Egypt, is largely of Neolithic origin. The study analyzed North African populations, including North Egyptians and South Egyptians, as well as samples from southern Europe, the Middle East, and sub-Saharan Africa, and revealed the following conclusions about the male-lineage variation in North Africa: "The lineages that are most prevalent in North Africa are distinct from those in the regions to the immediate north and south: Europe and sub-Saharan Africa ... two haplogroups predominate within North Africa, together making up almost two-thirds of the male lineages: E3b2 and J* (42% and 20%, respectively). E3b2 is rare outside North Africa, and is otherwise known only from Mali, Niger, and Sudan to the immediate south, and the Near East and Southern Europe at very low frequencies. Haplogroup J reaches its highest frequencies in the Middle East".

A study by Lucotte using the Y-chromosome of 274 male individuals (162 from Lower Egypt, 66 from Upper Egypt, 46 from Lower Nubia) found that the main haplotype V has higher frequency in the North than in the South, and haplotype XI has higher frequency in the South than in the North, whereas haplotype IV is found in the South (highest in Lower Nubia). The study states that haplotype IV is also characteristic of Sub-Saharan populations. Remarking on Lucotte's Y-chromosome study, which found that haplotypes V, XI, and IV are most common, Keita states that "a synthesis of evidence from archaeology, historical linguistics, texts, distribution of haplotypes outside Egypt, and some demographic considerations lends greater support to the establishment, before the Middle Kingdom, of the observed distributions of the most prevalent haplotypes V, XI, and IV. It is suggested that the pattern of diversity for these variants in the Egyptian Nile Valley was largely the product of population events that occurred in the late Pleistocene to mid-Holocene through the First Dynasty". Keita later states "Later, mid-Holocene climatic-driven migrations led to a major settlement of the valley in Upper Egypt and Nubia, but less so in Lower Egypt, by diverse Saharans with haplotypes IV, XI, and V. These people fused with the indigenous valley peoples, as did Near Easterners with VII and VIII, but perhaps also some V".

The major downstream mutations within the M35 subclade are M78 and M81. There are also other M35 lineages, e.g., M123. In Egypt, haplotypes VII and VIII are associated with the J haplogroup, which is predominant in the Near East.

Population	Nb	A/B	E1b1a	E1b1b1 (M35)	E1b1b1a (M78)	E1b1b1b1 (M81)	E1b1b1b2 (M123, M34)	F	K	G	I	J1	J2	R1a	R1b	Other	Study
Egyptians	110	0	3.5%	0	36%	0	8.5%	0	0	7.5%	0	24.5%	2%	2.8%	8.4%	6.5%	Fadhloui-Zid et al. (2013)
Egyptians	370	1.35%	2.43%	3.24%	21.89%	11.89%	6.76%	1.08%	0.27%	5.68%	0.54%	20.81%	6.75%	2.16%	5.94%	9.21%	Bekada et al. (2013)
Egyptians	147	2.7%	2.7%	0	18.4%	5.4%	0	0	8.2%	8.8%	0	19.7%	12.2%	3.4%	4.1%	2.1%	Luis et al. (2004)
Egyptians from El-Hayez Oasis (Western Desert)	35	0	5.70%	5.7%	28.6%	28.6%	0	0	0	0	0	31.4%	0	0	0	0	Kujanová et al. (2009)
Berbers from Siwa Oasis (Western Desert)	93	28.0%	6.5%	2.2%	6.5%	1%	0	0	0	3.2%	0	7.5%	6.5%	0	28.0%	8.3%	Dugoujon et al. (2009)
Egyptians	87	1%	3%	10%	31%	0	2.5%	0	0	2%	0	20%	15%	5%	2%	8.5%	Pagani et al. (2015)
Northern Egyptians	44	2.3%	0	4.5%	27.3%	11.3%	0	6.8%	2.3%	0	0	9.1%	9.1%	2.3%	9.9%	6.8%	Arredi et al. (2004)
Southern Egyptians	29	0.0%	0	0	17.2%	6.8%	0	17.2%	10.3%	0	3.4%	20.7%	3.4%	0	13.8%	0	Arredi et al. (2004)

Distribution of E1b1b1a (E-M78) and its subclades

Population	N	E-M78	E-M78*	E-V12*	E-V13	E-V22	E-V32	E-V65	Study
Egyptians (sample includes people labeled as "berber" and people from the oases)	370	21.89%	0.81%	7.03%	0.81%	9.19%	1.62%	2.43%	Bekada et al. (2013)
Southern Egyptians	79	50.6%		44.3%	1.3%	3.8%		1.3%	Cruciani et al. (2007)
Egyptians from Bahari	41	41.4%		14.6%	2.4%	21.9%		2.4%	Cruciani et al. (2007)
Northern Egyptians (Delta)	72	23.6%		5.6%	1.4%	13.9%	2.8%		Cruciani et al. (2007)
Egyptians from Gurna Oasis	34	17.6%	5.9%	8.8%			2.9%		Cruciani et al. (2007)
Egyptian from Siwa Oasis	93	6.4%		2.1%				4.3%	Cruciani et al. (2007)

== Genetic and biological history ==
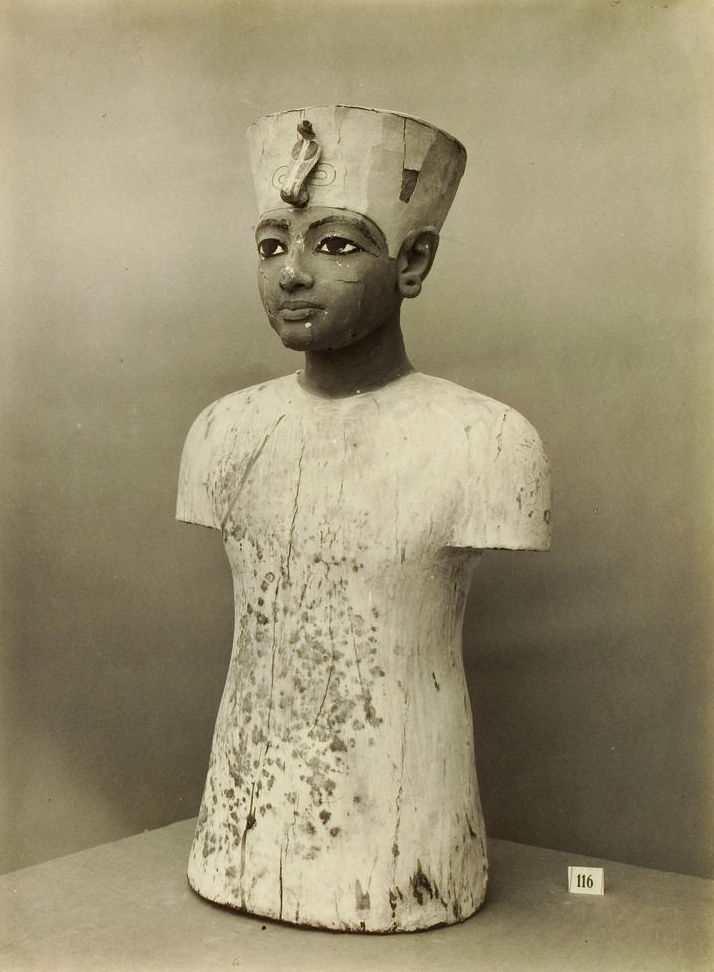
A painted, wooden figure of Tutankhamun found in his royal tomb

=== Peopling of Ancient Egypt ===
Mainstream scholars have situated the ethnicity and the origins of predynastic, southern Egypt as a foundational community primarily in northeast Africa which included the Sudan, tropical Africa and the Sahara whilst recognising the population variability that became characteristic of the pharaonic period. Pharaonic Egypt featured a physical gradation across the regional populations, with Upper Egyptians having shared more biological affinities with Sudanese and southernly African populations, whereas Lower Egyptians had closer genetic links with Levantine and Mediterranean populations.

In 2025, UNESCO General History of Africa International Scientific Committee launched a multidisciplinary publication volume which related to the early population of Egypt. The book volume maintained that Egypt had a fluctuating distribution of African and Eurasian populations, which was dependent on historical circumstances. The review section focused on the 1974 "Peopling of Egypt" symposium and stated that accumulated research over three decades had confirmed the migration from Southernly African along with Saharan populations into the early Nile Valley. Upper Egypt was now positioned as a origin point of Pharaonic unification, with supporting archaeological, anthropological, genetic and linguistic sources of evidence having identified close affinities between Upper Egypt and other Sub-Saharan African populations.

=== Skeletal biology ===
According to historian, Donald Redford, the earliest Paleolithic and Neolithic periods of prehistoric Egypt have left very little in the way of archaeological evidence, but by around the 9000 to 6000 BC Neolithic Revolution farming settlements had appeared all over Egypt.

Some studies based on morphological, genetic, and archaeological data have attributed these settlements to migrants from the Fertile Crescent in the Near East returning during the Egyptian and North African Neolithic, bringing agriculture to the region.

However, other scholars have disputed this view and cited linguistic, biological anthropological, archaeological and genetic data which does not support the hypothesis of a mass migration from the Levantine during the prehistoric period. According to historian William Stiebling and archaeologist Susan N. Helft, this view posits that the ancient Egyptians are the same original population group as Nubians and other Saharan populations, with some genetic input from Arabian, Levantine, North African, and Indo-European groups who have known to have settled in Egypt during its long history. Keita stated that genetic data indicates that the "P2 (PN2) marker, within the E haplogroup, connects the predominant Y chromosome lineage found in Africa overall after the modern human left Africa. P2/M215-55 is found from the Horn of Africa up through the Nile Valley and west to the Maghreb, and P2/V38/M2 is predominant in most of infra-Saharan tropical Africa". Similarly, Ehret cited genetic evidence which had identified the Horn of Africa as a source of a genetic marker "M35/215" Y-chromosome lineage for a significant population component which moved north from that region into Egypt and the Levant. Ehret argued that this genetic distribution paralleled the spread of the Afrasian language family with the movement of people from the Horn of Africa into Egypt and added a new demic component to the existing population of Egypt 17,000 years ago.

Beginning in the predynastic period, some differences between the populations of Upper and Lower Egypt were ascertained through their skeletal remains, suggesting a gradual clinal pattern north to south.

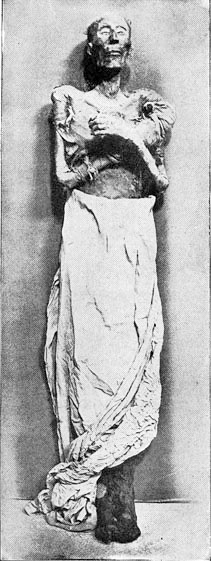
The mummy of 19th Dynasty King Ramesses II

When Lower and Upper Egypt were unified c. 3200 BC, the distinction began to blur, resulting in a more homogeneous population in Egypt, though the distinction remains true to some degree to this day. Some biological anthropologists such as Shomarka Keita believe the range of variability to be primarily indigenous and not necessarily the result of significant intermingling of widely divergent peoples. In 2005, Keita examined Badarian crania from predynastic upper Egypt in comparison to various European and tropical African crania. He found that the predynastic Badarian series clustered closer with the tropical African series. The comparative samples were selected based on "Brace et al.'s (1993) comments on the affinities of an upper Egyptian/Nubian epipalaeolithic series".

Keita describes the northern and southern patterns of the early predynastic period as "northern-Egyptian-Maghreb" and "tropical African variant" (overlapping with Nubia/Kush) respectively. He shows that a progressive change in Upper Egypt toward the northern Egyptian pattern of Lower Egypt takes place through the predynastic period. The southern pattern continues to predominate in Abydos, Upper Egypt by the First Dynasty, but "lower Egyptian, North African, and European patterns are observed also, thus making for great diversity." A group of noted physical anthropologists including C. Loring Brace conducted craniofacial studies of Egyptian skeletal remains and concluded similarly that:

"the Egyptians have been in place since back in the Pleistocene and have been largely unaffected by either invasions or migrations. As others have noted, Egyptians are Egyptians, and they were so in the past as well."

A 2006 bioarchaeological study on the dental morphology of ancient Egyptians by Prof. Joel Irish shows dental traits characteristic of indigenous North Africans and to a lesser extent Southwest Asian and European populations. Among the samples included in the study is skeletal material from the Hawara tombs of Fayum, which clustered very closely with the Badarian series of the predynastic period. All the samples, particularly those of the Dynastic period, were significantly divergent from a neolithic West Saharan sample from Lower Nubia. Biological continuity was also found intact from the dynastic to the post-pharaonic periods. According to Irish:

[The Egyptian] samples [996 mummies] exhibit morphologically simple, mass-reduced dentitions that are similar to those in populations from greater North Africa (Irish, 1993, 1998a–c, 2000) and, to a lesser extent, western Asia and Europe (Turner, 1985a; Turner and Markowitz, 1990; Roler, 1992; Lipschultz, 1996; Irish, 1998a). Similar craniofacial measurements among samples from these regions were reported as well (Brace et al., 1993)... an inspection of MMD values reveals no evidence of increasing phenetic distance between samples from the first and second halves of this almost 3,000-year-long period. For example, phenetic distances between First-Second Dynasty Abydos and samples from Fourth Dynasty Saqqara (MMD ¼ 0.050), 11–12th Dynasty Thebes (0.000), 12th Dynasty Lisht (0.072), 19th Dynasty Qurneh (0.053), and 26th–30th Dynasty Giza (0.027) do not exhibit a directional increase through time... Thus, despite increasing foreign influence after the Second Intermediate Period, not only did Egyptian culture remain intact (Lloyd, 2000a), but the people themselves, as represented by the dental samples, appear biologically constant as well... Gebel Ramlah [Neolithic Nubian/Western Desert sample] is, in fact, significantly different from Badari based on the 22-trait MMD (Table 4). For that matter, the Neolithic Western Desert sample is significantly different from all others [but] is closest to predynastic and early dynastic samples.

However, in another study 13 years later conducted by these same group of anthropologists they had found close affinities between Naqada Egyptians, Somalis, ancient and modern Nubians, and, to a lesser extent, Niger-Congo-speaking populations; on the other hand, no affinities were found between the Egyptians of Naqada and samples from other regions of the world, such as the Mediterranean (including modern Egyptians) and the Middle East, with the exceptions of the Fellaheen of Israel and the Natufians, who, the authors claim, had a clear link with Sub-Saharan Africa.

In 2023, Christopher Ehret reported that biological anthropological findings, performed by Keita and Sonia Zakrzewski, had determined:

"major burial sites of those founding locales of ancient Egypt in the fourth millennium BCE, notably El-Badari as well as Naqada, show no demographic indebtedness to the Levant".

Ehret specified that these studies revealed cranial and dental affinities with "closest parallels" to other longtime populations in the surrounding areas of Northeastern Africa "such as Nubia and the northern Horn of Africa". He further commented that the Naqada and Badarian populations did not migrate "from somewhere else but were descendants of the long-term inhabitants of these portions of Africa going back many millennia". Ehret also criticised the study for asserting that there was "no sub-Saharan" component in the Egyptian population.

=== Genetic Studies ===
Genetic analysis of modern Egyptians reveals that they have paternal lineages common to indigenous North-East African populations primarily and to Near Eastern peoples to a lesser extent—these lineages would have spread during the Neolithic and were maintained by the predynastic period. University of Chicago Egyptologist Frank Yurco suggested a historical, regional and ethnolinguistic continuity, asserting that "the mummies and skeletons of ancient Egyptians indicate they were similar to the modern Egyptians and other people of the Afro-Asiatic ethnic grouping".

Genetic studies revealed that due to the continuous middle eastern gene flow, Egyptians are genetically closer and more similar to West Asians than to other North Africans and Africans in general.

An allele frequency comparative study led by the Egyptian Army Major General Doctor Tarek Taha conducted STR analysis in 2020 between the two main Egyptian ethnic groups, Muslims and Christians, each group represented by a sample of 100 unrelated healthy individuals, supported the conclusion that Egyptian Muslims and Egyptian Christians genetically originate from the same ancestors.

A study by Schuenemann et al. (2017) described the extraction and analysis of DNA from 151 mummified ancient Egyptian individuals, whose remains were recovered from Abusir el-Meleq in Middle Egypt. The specimens were living in a period stretching from the late New Kingdom to the Roman era (1388 BCE–426 CE). Complete mitochondrial DNA (mtDNA) sequences were obtained for 90 of the mummies and were compared with each other and with several other ancient and modern datasets. The scientists found that the ancient Egyptian individuals in their own dataset possessed highly similar mitochondrial profiles throughout the examined period. Modern Egyptians generally shared this maternal haplogroup pattern. The study was able to measure the mitochondrial DNA of 90 individuals, and it showed that the mitochondrial DNA composition of Egyptian mummies has shown a high level of affinity with the DNA of the populations of the Near East and North African populations and had significantly more affinity with south-eastern Europeans than with sub-Saharan Africans. Genome-wide data could only be successfully extracted from three of these individuals. Of these three, the Y-chromosome haplogroups of two individuals could be assigned to the Middle-Eastern haplogroup J, and one to haplogroup E1b1b1 common in North Africa. The absolute estimates of sub-Saharan African ancestry in these three individuals ranged from 6 to 15%, which is slightly less than the level of sub-Saharan African ancestry in modern Egyptians (the modern Egyptian samples were taken from Cairo and the Bahariya Oasis), which ranged from 14 to 21%. The ranges depend on the method and choice of reference populations. The study's authors cautioned that the mummies may not be representative of the ancient Egyptian population as a whole, since they were recovered from the northern part of middle Egypt.

Professor Stephen Quirke, an Egyptologist at University College London, expressed caution about the paper by Schuenemann et al. (2017), saying that "There has been this very strong attempt throughout the history of Egyptology to disassociate ancient Egyptians from the modern [Egyptian] population." He added that he was "particularly suspicious of any statement that may have the unintended consequences of asserting—yet again from a Northern European or North American perspective—that there's a discontinuity there [between ancient and modern Egyptians]". Gourdine et al. criticised the methodology of the Scheunemann et al. study and argued that the Sub-Saharan "genetic affinities" may be attributed to "early settlers" and "the relevant Sub-Saharan genetic markers" do not correspond with the geography of known trade routes".

A 2020 study by Gad, Hawass, et al. analysed mitochondrial and Y-chromosomal haplogroups from Tutankhamun's family members of the 18th Dynasty, using comprehensive control procedures to ensure quality results. The study found that the Y-chromosome haplogroup of the family was R1b, which is believed to have originated in the Western Asia/Near Eastern region, and dispersed from there to Europe and parts of Africa during the Neolithic. Haplogroup R1b is carried by modern Egyptians. Modern Egypt is also the only African country that is known to harbor all three R1 subtypes, including R1b-M269. The Y-chromosome profiles for Tutankhamun and Amenhotep III were incomplete and the analysis produced differing probability figures despite having concordant allele results. Because the relationships of these two mummies with the KV55 mummy (identified as Akhenaten) had previously been confirmed in an earlier study, the haplogroup prediction of both mummies could be derived from the full profile of the KV55 data.

A follow-up study by Scheunemann & Urban et al. (2021) was carried out collecting samples from six excavation sites along the entire length of the Nile valley spanning 4000 years of Egyptian history. Samples from 17 mummies and 14 skeletal remains were collected, and high quality mitochondrial genomes were reconstructed from 10 individuals. According to the authors the analyzed mitochondrial genomes matched the results from the 2017 study at Abusir el-Meleq.

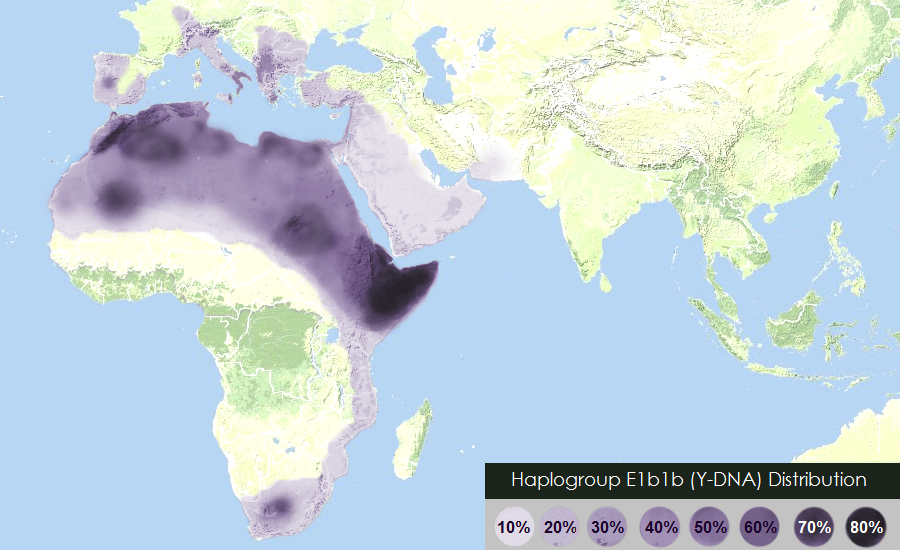
E1b1b is the most common paternal haplogroup across Africa, including Egypt, with modern genetic studies rooting the origin of the E haplogroup in East Africa.

In 2022, S.O.Y. Keita analysed 8 Short Tandem loci (STR) published data from studies by Hawass et al. 2010;2012 which sought to determine familial relations and research pathological features such as potential, infectious diseases among the New Kingdom royal mummies which included Tutankhamun and Rameses III. Keita, using an algorithm that only has three choices: Eurasians, Sub-Saharan Africans, and East Asians concluded that the majority of the samples, which included the genetic remains of Tutankhamun and Rameses III had a population "affinity with "Sub-Saharan" Africans in one affinity analysis". However, Keita cautioned that this does not mean that the royal mummies "lacked other affiliations" which he argued had been obscured in typological thinking. Keita further added that different "data and algorithms might give different results" which reflected the complexity of biological heritage and the associated interpretation.

A study by Hammarén et al. (2023) isolated the Non-African components of the genomes of modern-day Northeast Africans, and found that Sudanese Copts and Egyptian Muslims from Cairo bore most similarities to Levantines, unlike the other populations in the region which had predominant genetic contributions from the Arabian peninsula rather than Levant for their Non-African genetic component. The study also found that Egyptian Muslims and Sudanese Copts are genetically most similar to Middle Eastern groups rather than the other African populations, and they estimated the Admixture date for Egyptians with Eurasians to have occurred around the 14th century, however the authors noted that "most, if not all, of the populations in this study have or have had admixture with populations from the Middle East during the Arab expansion, and this newer admixture is obscuring older admixture patterns". The study overall points that the distribution of Eurasian ancestry in modern eastern and northeast Africa is the result of more recent migrations that many of which is recorded in historical texts rather than ancient ones.

Genetic analysis of a modern Upper Egyptian population in Adaima by Eric Crubézy had identified genetic markers common across Africa, with 71% of the Adaima samples carrying E1b1 haplogroup and 3% carrying the L0f mitochondrial haplogroup. A secondary review, published in UNESCO General History of Africa Volume IX, in 2025 noted the results were preliminary and need to be confirmed by other laboratories with new sequencing methods. This was supported by an anthropological study which found the notable presence of dental markers, characteristic of Khoisan people, in a predynastic-era cemetery at Adaïma. The genetic marker E1b1 was identified in a number of genetic studies to have wide distribution across Egypt, with "P2/215/M35.1 (E1b1b), for short M35, likely also originated in eastern tropical Africa, and is predominantly distributed in an arc from the Horn of Africa up through Egypt". Multiple STR analysis of the Amarna royal mummies (including Rameses III, Tutankhamun and Amenhotep III) were deployed to estimate their ethnicity have found they had strong affinities with modern Sub-Saharan populations. Nonetheless, these forms of analysis were not exhaustive as only 8 of the 13 CODIS markers were used.

In the view of scholars Christopher Ehret, David Schoenbrun, Steven A. Brandt, and SOY Keita, the Nile Valley served as a crossroads which resulted in population interactions over a long period of time. They cite a range of published genetic studies which identified E1b1 affinities with the Copt populations that are common among Afro-Asiatic linguistic families including Ethiopian, Cushitic, Beja, Semitic and Berber populations. These authors referenced a range of genetic studies on the Coptic population which include "(Cruciani et al. 2007; Keita 2008) show for its population: 38.3–60% of M35 and 2–6.9% for M2; M89 12– 58%, and smaller percentages of other haplogroups e.g. B. One Coptic sample from a community that emigrated from Egypt to Sudan had frequencies of 17% of M35, 67% of M89, and 15% of B (Hassan et al. 2008). Another sample of Copts from Adaima in Egypt had >70% of M35, majority M78 (Crubezy 2010)".

=== Multidisciplinary perspectives on population genetics ===
Scholarship has appreciated the value of DNA studies in illustrating ancestral relationships and migration patterns but cautioned its over-reliance due to its emergence as a relative new field, the limited availability of sample sizes and the potential for bias in interpretation and methodology. Rather, it has been argued that continued emphasis should be on genetic studies to be interpreted in a compatible framework with other disciplines (archaeology, historical linguistics, physical anthropology) to examine the population origin of ancient Egyptians.

Anthropologist Alain Anselin found the distribution of linguistic, archaeological data to be consistent with initial genetic findings on Upper Egyptian population in Gurna which had a remnant of high M1 haplogroup and sub-Saharan affinities. This has been interpreted to suggest that the current population structure of Egypt may be the result of neighbouring influences on the ancestral population. Anselin also suggested that the combination of historical genetics and recent archaeological excavations in the Western Desert could contribute to the peopling of Egypt for which Saharan affinities had been identified in a previous, interdisciplinary review.

However, historian William Stiebling and archaeologist Susan N. Helft, stated conflicting DNA analysis on recent genetic samples such as the Amarna royal mummies has led to a lack of consensus on the genetic makeup of the ancient Egyptians and their geographic origins. They noted that the 2017 genetic study had performed the largest study on ancient Egyptians but noted that the findings still derived from a small sample of mummies from one site in Middle Egypt dating to the New Kingdom and later periods. Stiebling and Helft also stated that this study could not represent earlier populations or Egyptians from Upper Egypt who were geographically closer to Sub-Saharan populations.

Gourdine et al. criticised the methodology of the Scheunemann et al. study and argued that the Sub-Saharan "genetic affinities" may be attributed to "early settlers" and "the relevant Sub-Saharan genetic markers" do not correspond with the geography of known trade routes". However, modern population DNA studies linked this Sub-Saharan input to the trans-Saharan slave trade in Egypt and Morocco and dated it to 700 years ago in Egypt and 1200 years ago in Morocco. Historic evidence estimates that 6 million black slaves were transported across the Sahara between the years 650 AD and 1500 AD

In 2022, archaeologist Danielle Candelora noted several limitations with the 2017 Scheunemann et al. study such as its "untested sampling methods, small sample size and problematic comparative data" which she argued had been misused to legitimise racist conceptions of Ancient Egypt with "scientific evidence".

In 2025, the UNESCO International Scientific Committee Chair, Augustin Holl, for drafting the General History of Africa Volumes IX-XI had reaffirmed the view that Egypt had African and Eurasian populations. According to the review section, this has confirmed the migration of groups from the Sahara and regions south of Egypt to the valley, with a number of genetic, linguistic, archaeological and anthropological studies cited in the review section having demonstrated strong affinities between the Upper Egyptian population and Sub-Saharan groups. Nonetheless, UNESCO scholars Augustin Holl and Jean Gourdine both presented similar forms of criticisms, in the General History of Africa Volume IX, of the 2017 Scheunemann study in terms of its geographical coverage, general conclusions on the population of Egypt and methodological approach. Gourdine argued that there were a number of biases in the interpretation and the conclusions conflicted with other analysis such as the Amarna STR analysis, and evidence of identifiable African haplogroups such as E1b1b1, JK2955 (haplogroup L3) and JK2963 (haplogroup M1a1i), which preceded the trans-Saharan slave trade in Egypt.

Canadian historian Elise K Burton (2025) argued that recent aDNA research are deeply influenced by racial debates over the ethnicity of ancient Egyptians. She advanced the view that the perspectives of Western, West African and Egyptian scientific researchers have shaped the interpretation of genetic research and this has triggered conflict over access to the mummified remains of ancient Egyptians. She criticised early attempts of Cheikh Anta Diop to leverage paleoserology as reflecting racialist standards defined by European scholarship. Burton also expressed criticism for nationalist sentiments exhibited among Egyptian scholars such as Zahi Hawass and restricting foreign access to Egyptian royal mummies to maintain “genetic sovereignty”. She further highlighted that anti-black racism endured in Egyptian society and nationalist genetics presented its own variant of racialist genetics, as discussed in reference to the national genome project in Egypt. Lastly, Burton believed that Euro-American researchers benefited from the historical colonialism in facilitating a wide available source of Egyptian mummies in European museums. She also mentioned that recent studies such as the 2017 DNA study have been interpreted under racialised lens.

== Gallery ==
Egyptian portraits

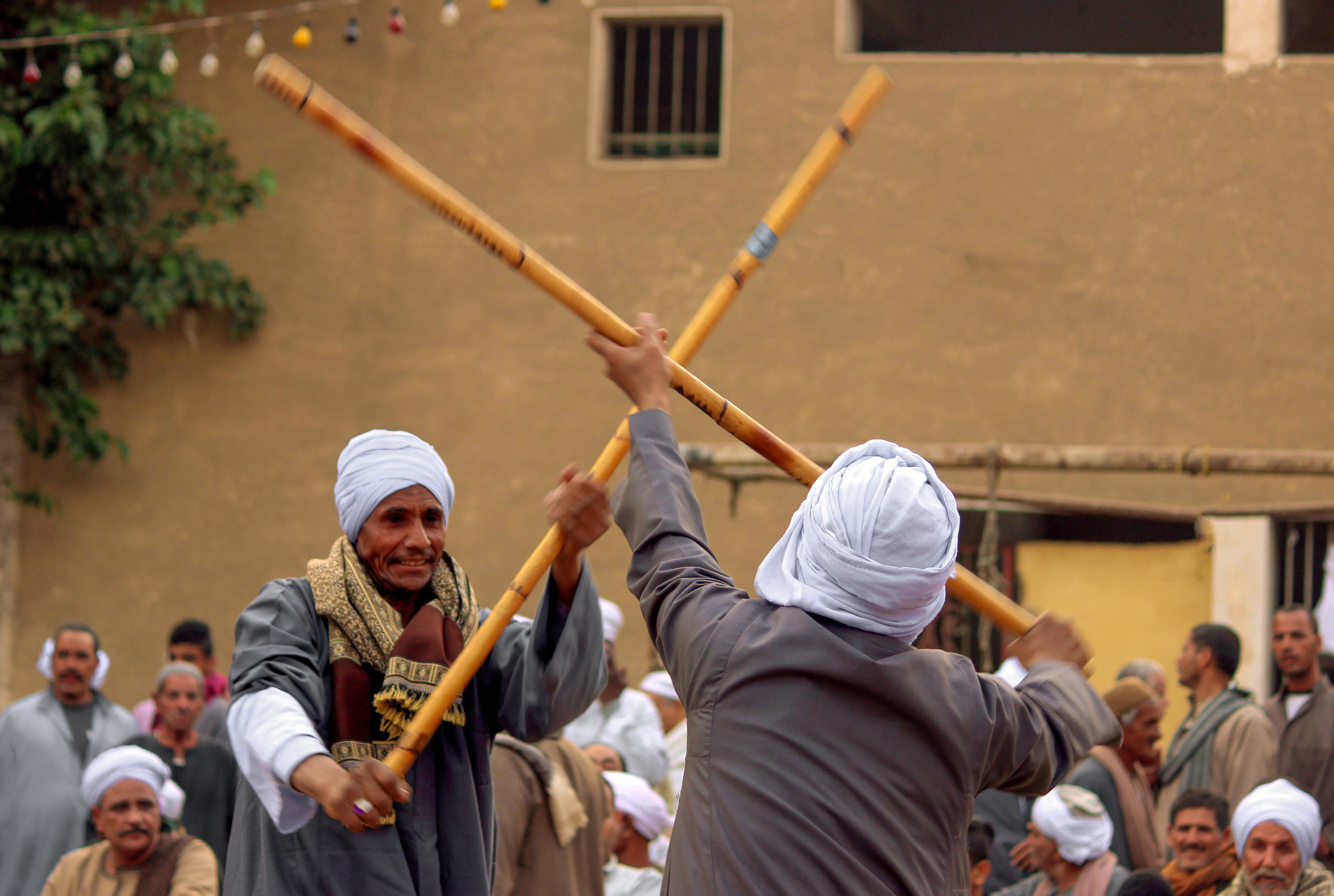
Egyptians performing tahtib, a traditional martial art

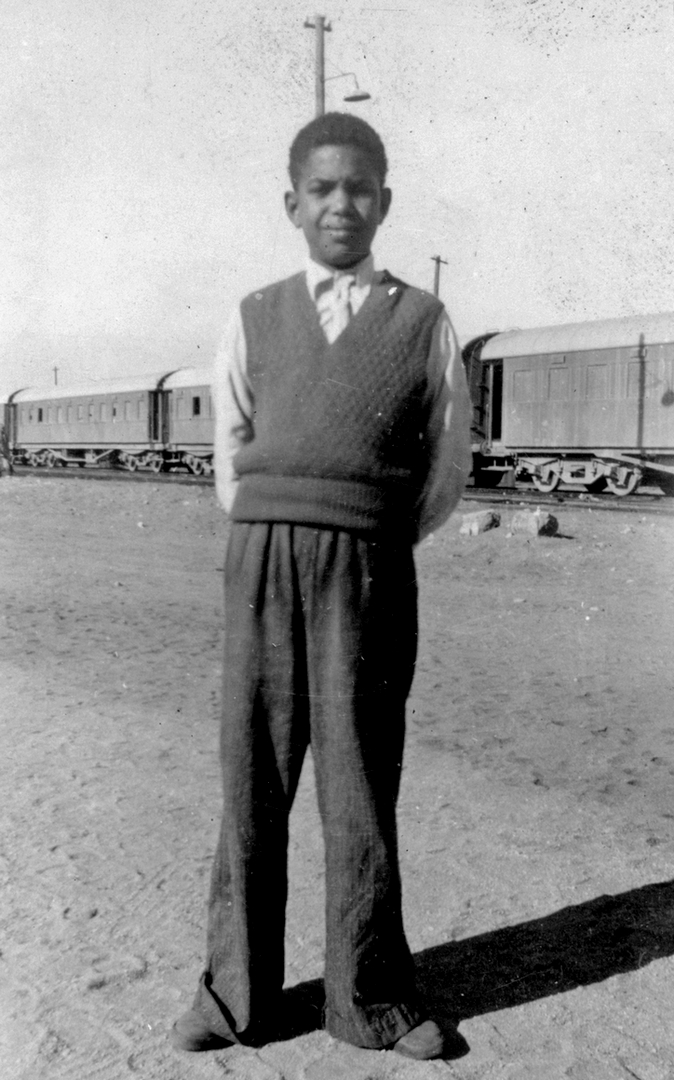
An Egyptian youth at El Kantara station, 1941

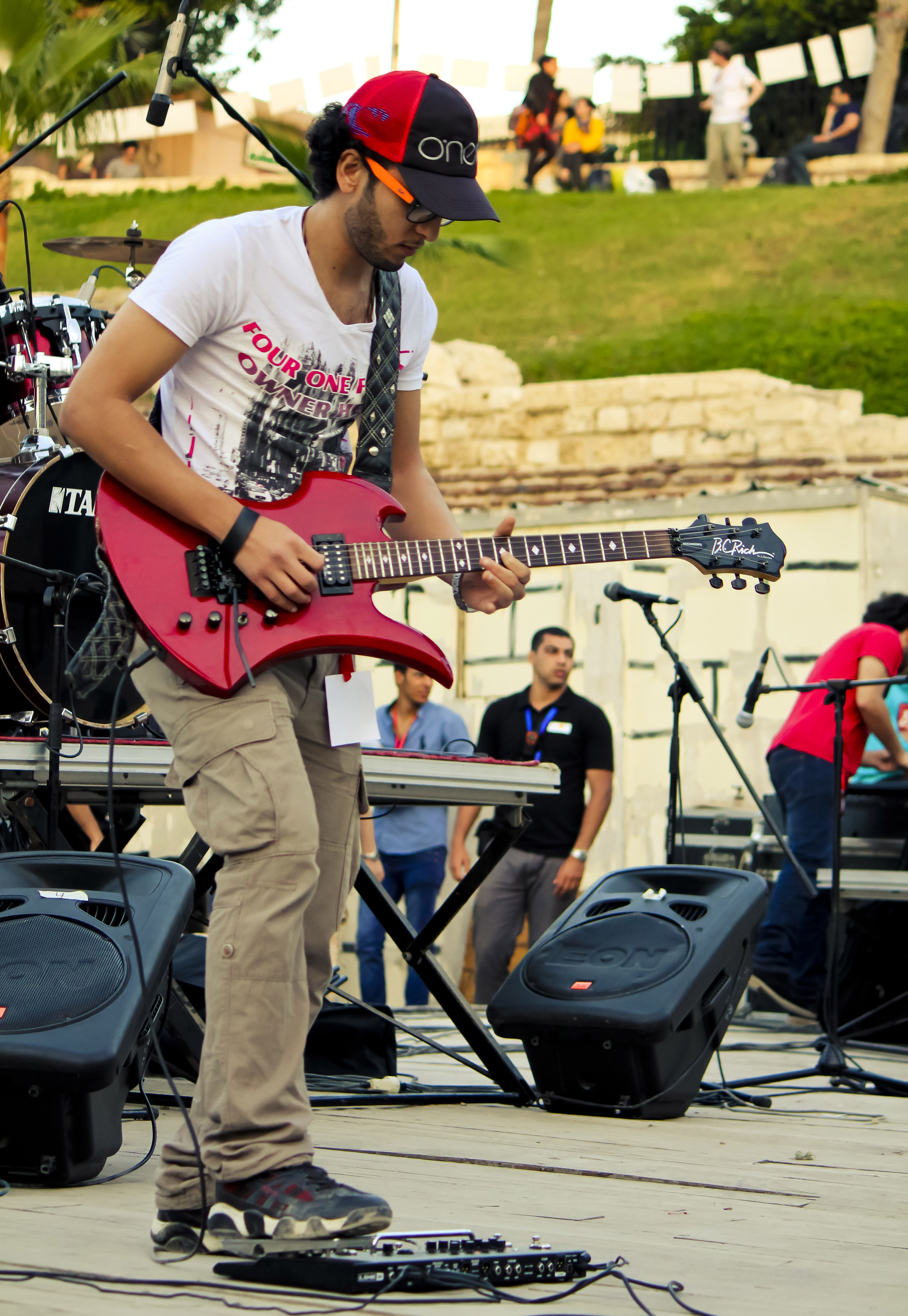
An Egyptian musician in Alexandria

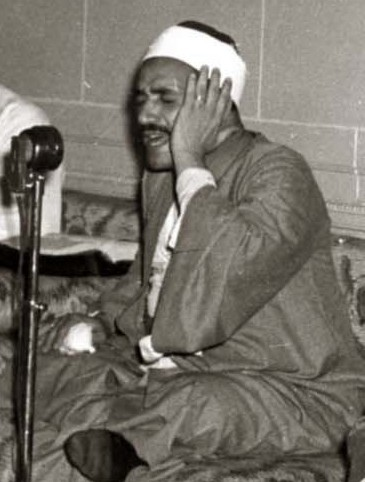
An Egyptian Qur'an reciter, 1942

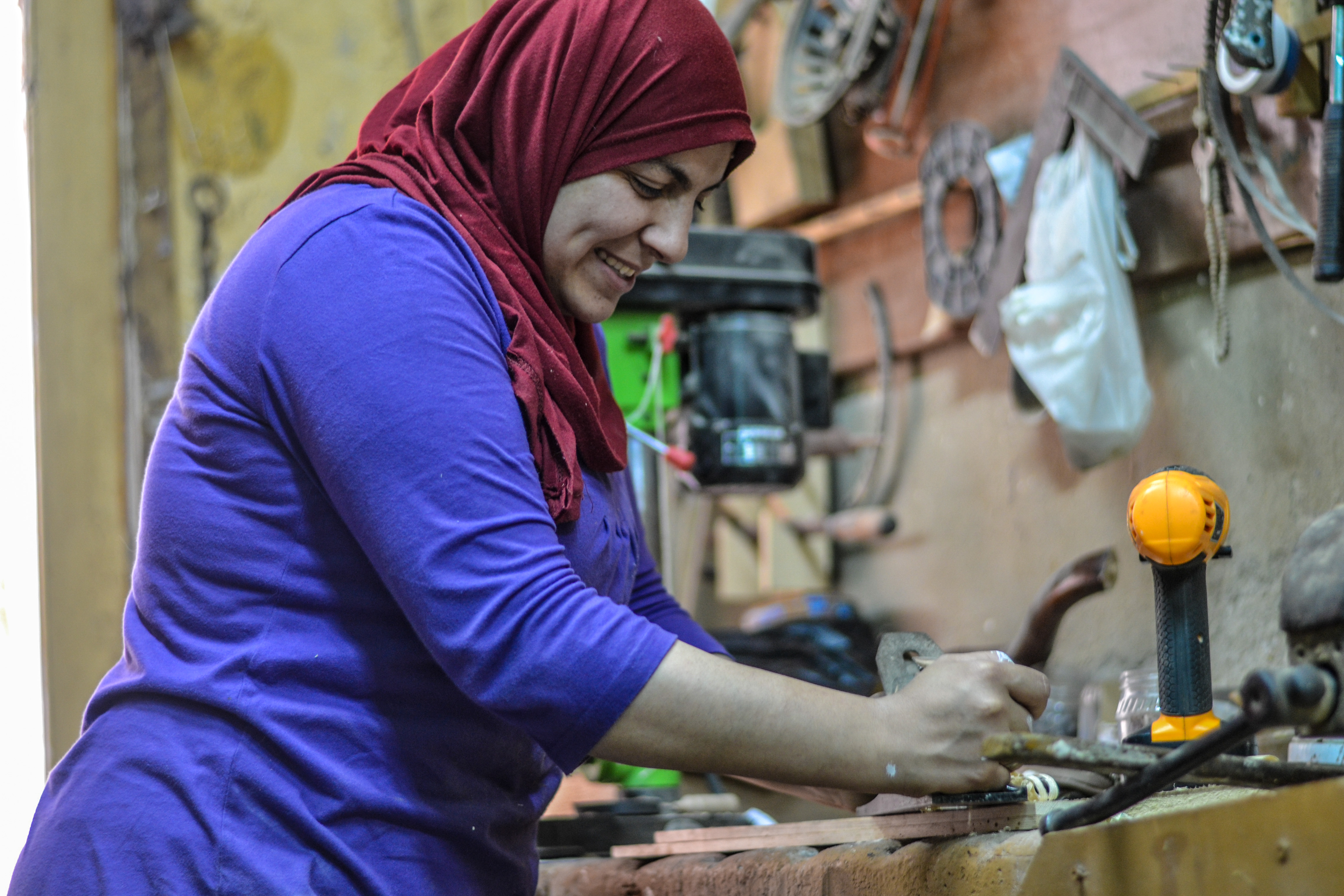
An Egyptian carpentress

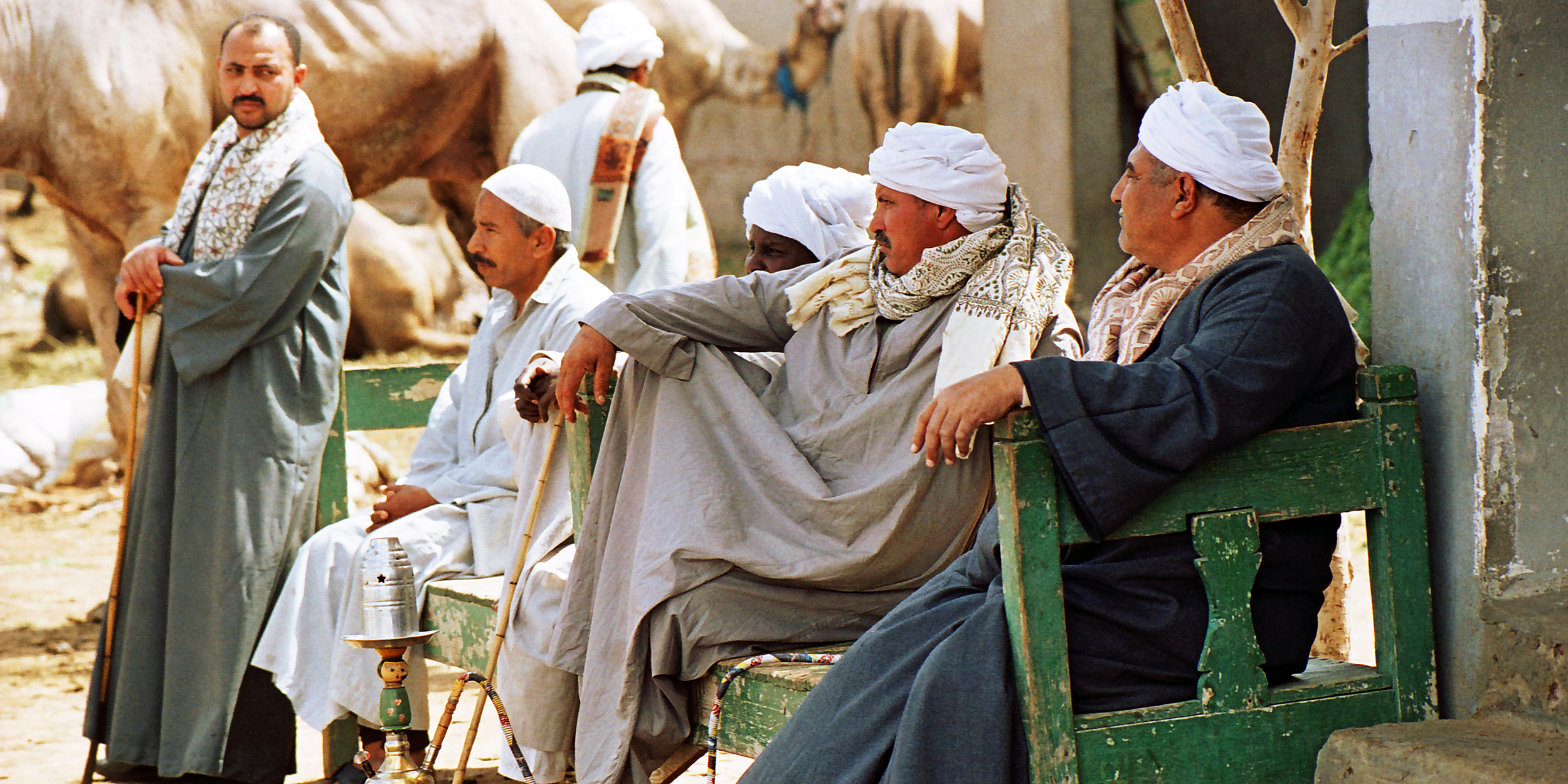
Egyptian men at a market in Cairo

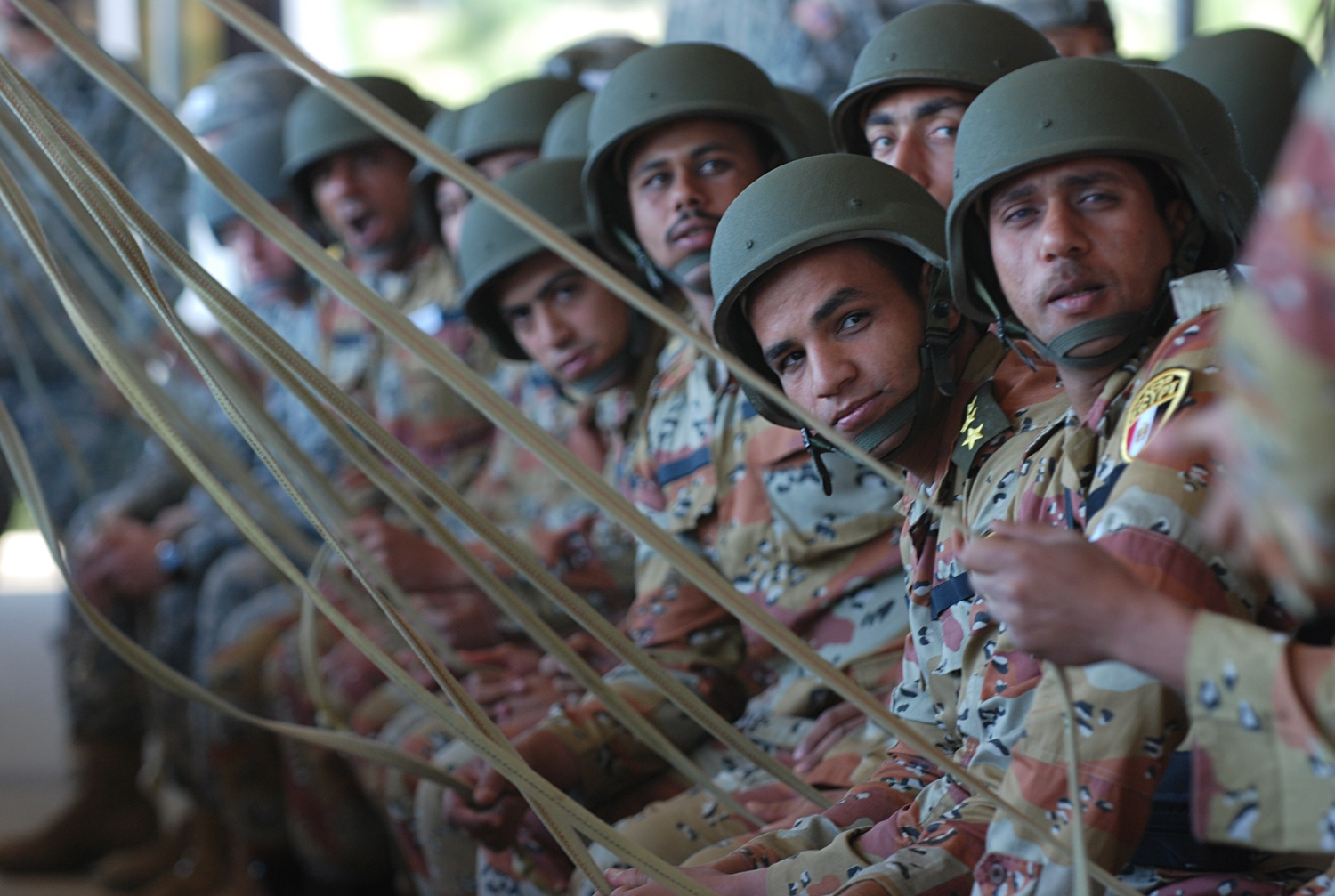
A group of Egyptian soldiers, 2009

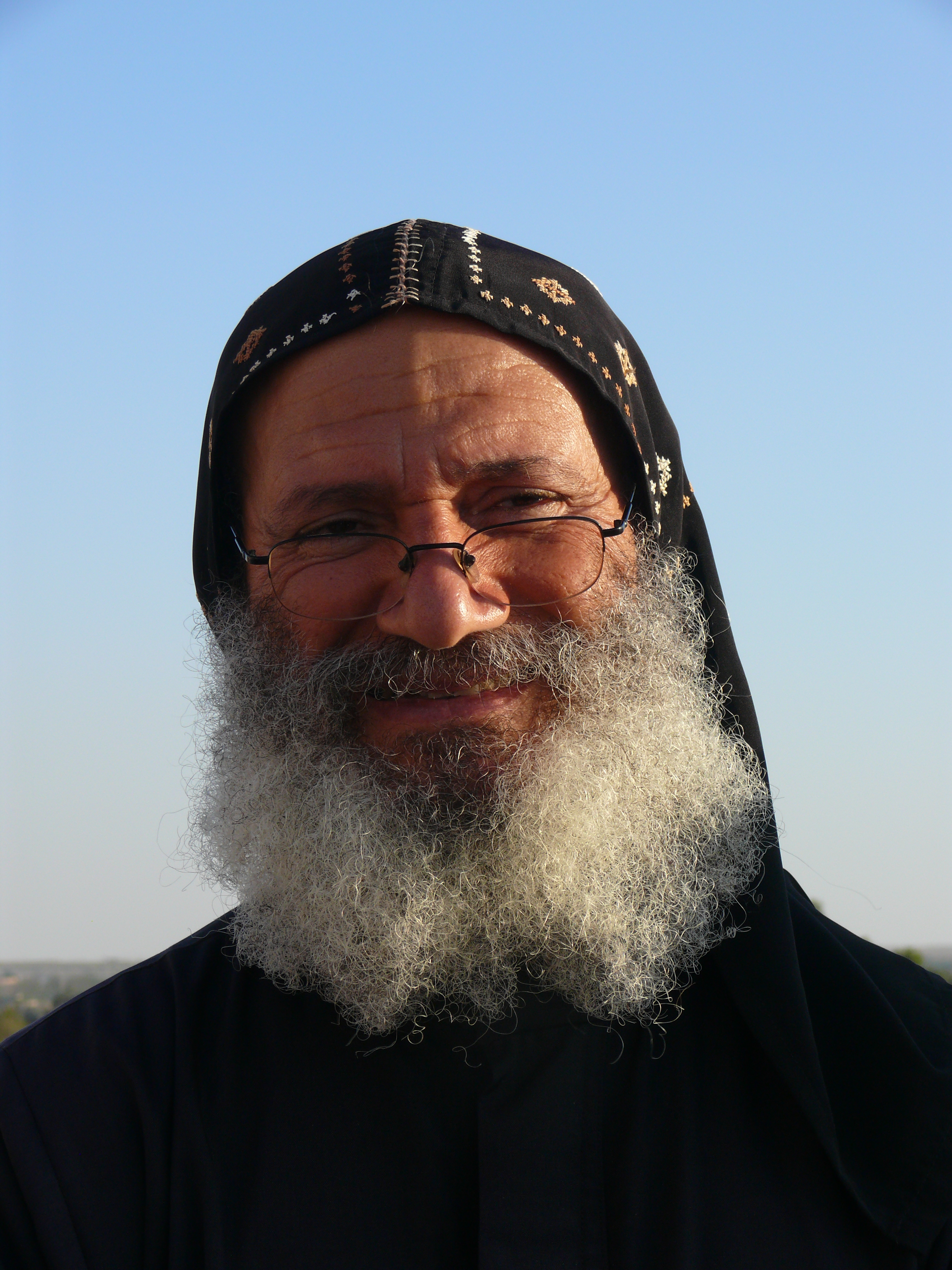
An Egyptian Coptic Orthodox monk

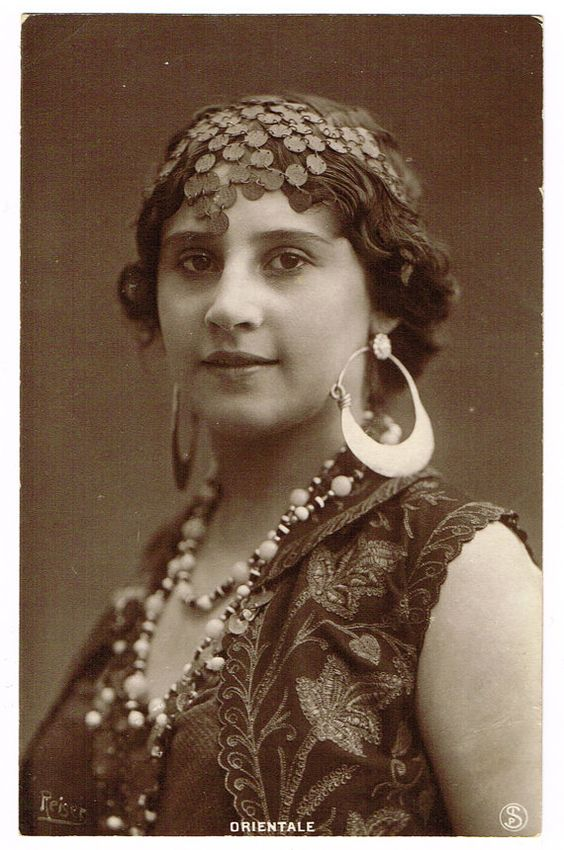
Egyptian woman, 1910s

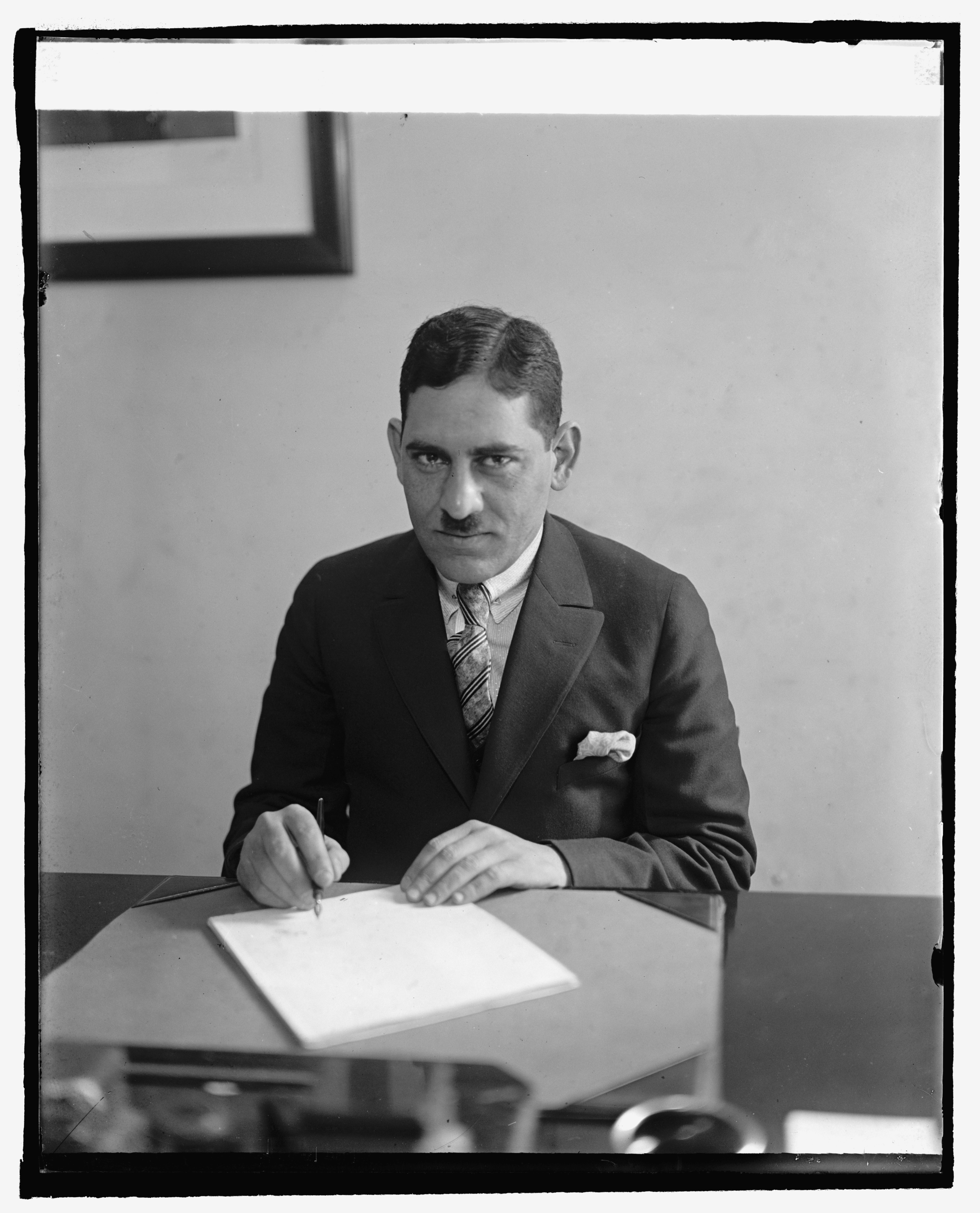
An Egyptian student, 1925

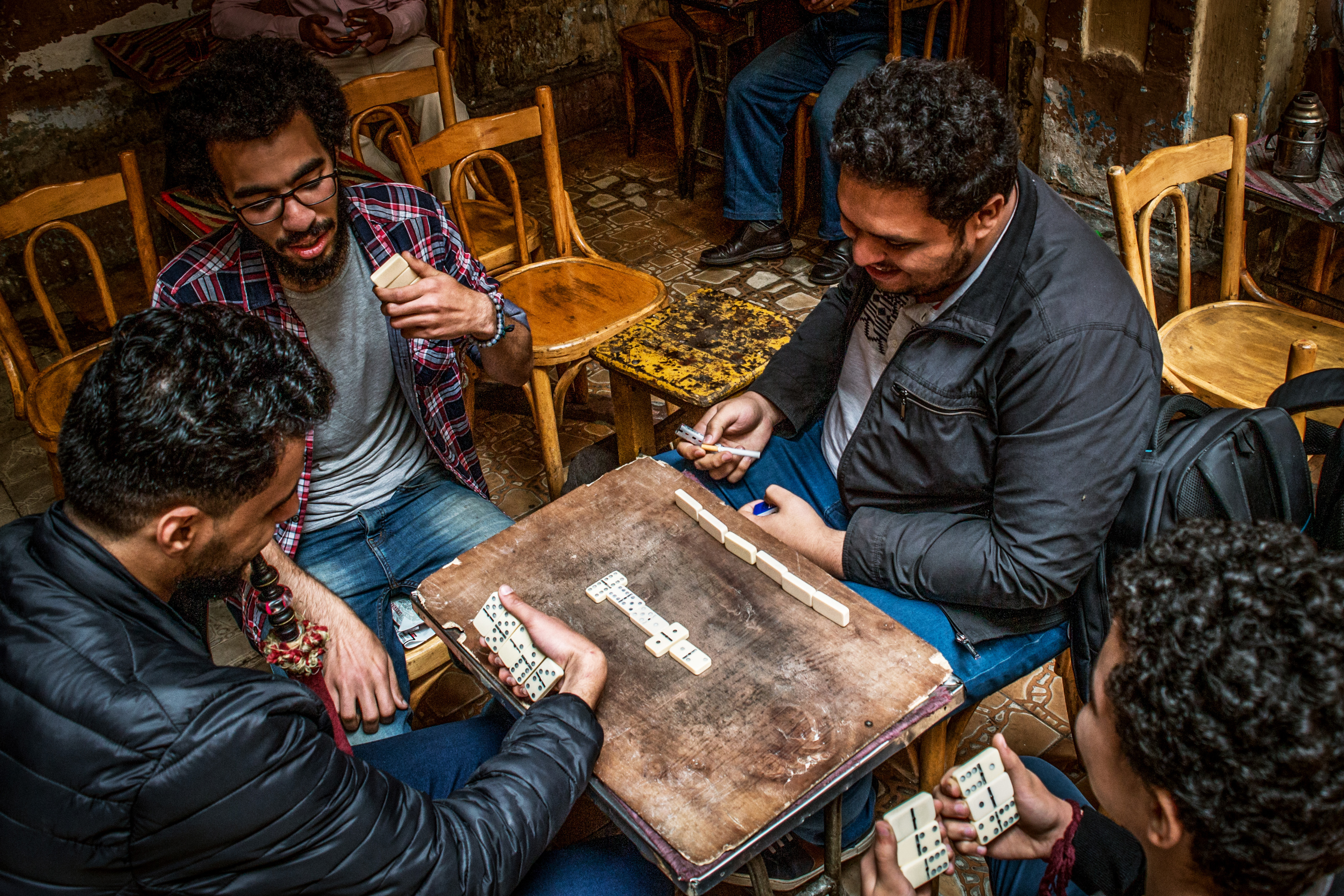
A group of Egyptians playing domino

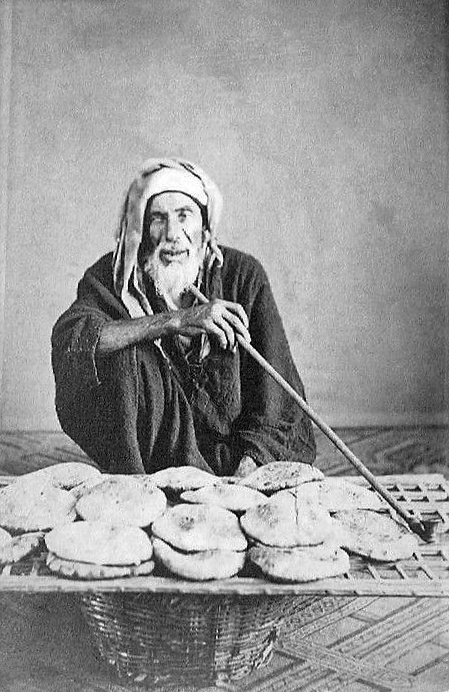
An elderly Egyptian vendor selling bread, 1870s

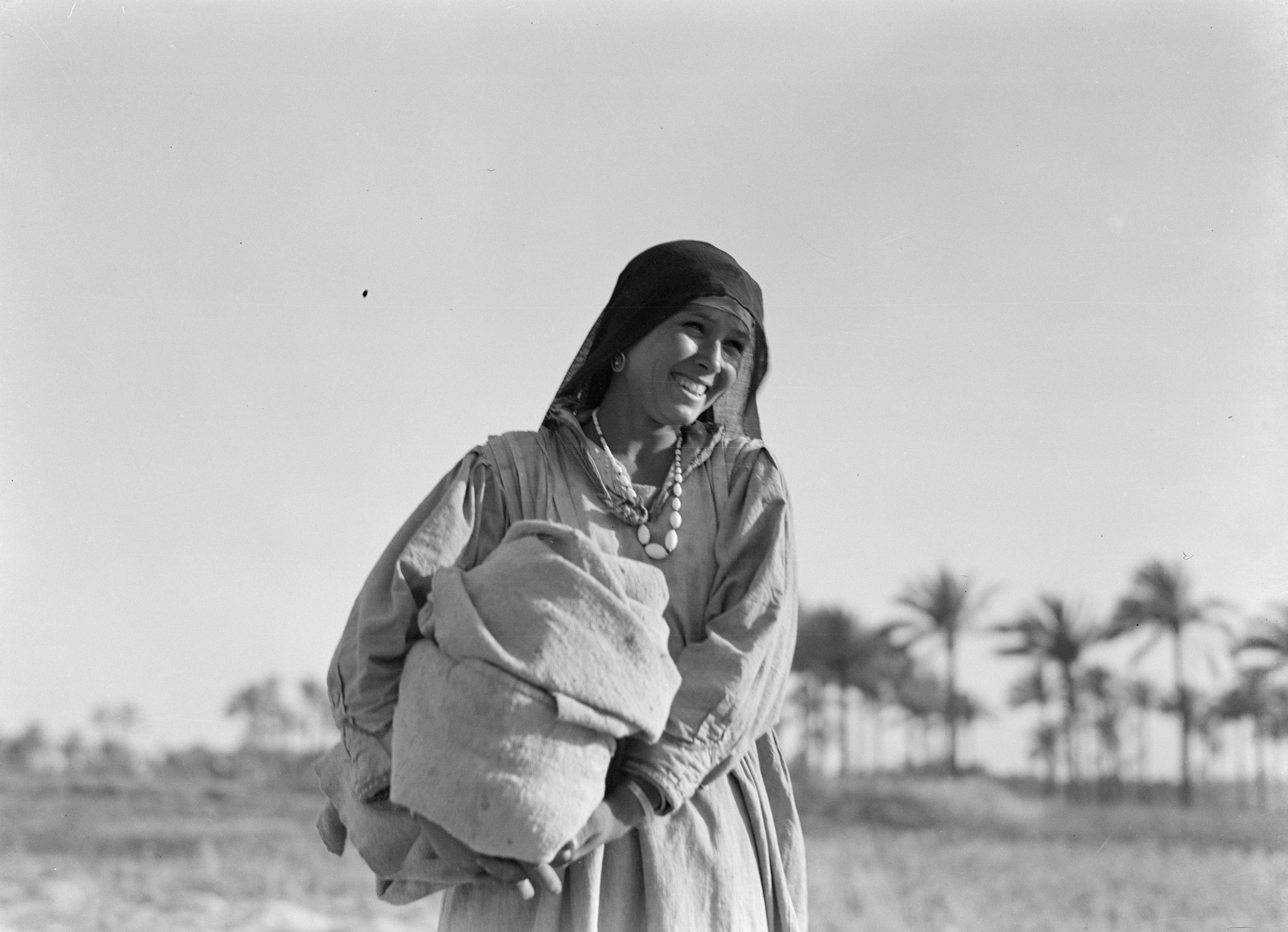
An Egyptian farmer, 1935

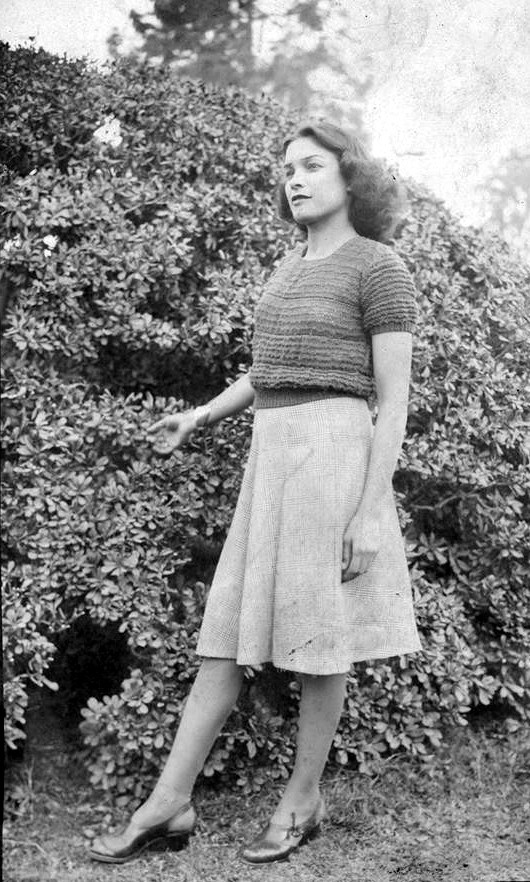
Egyptian woman, 1940s

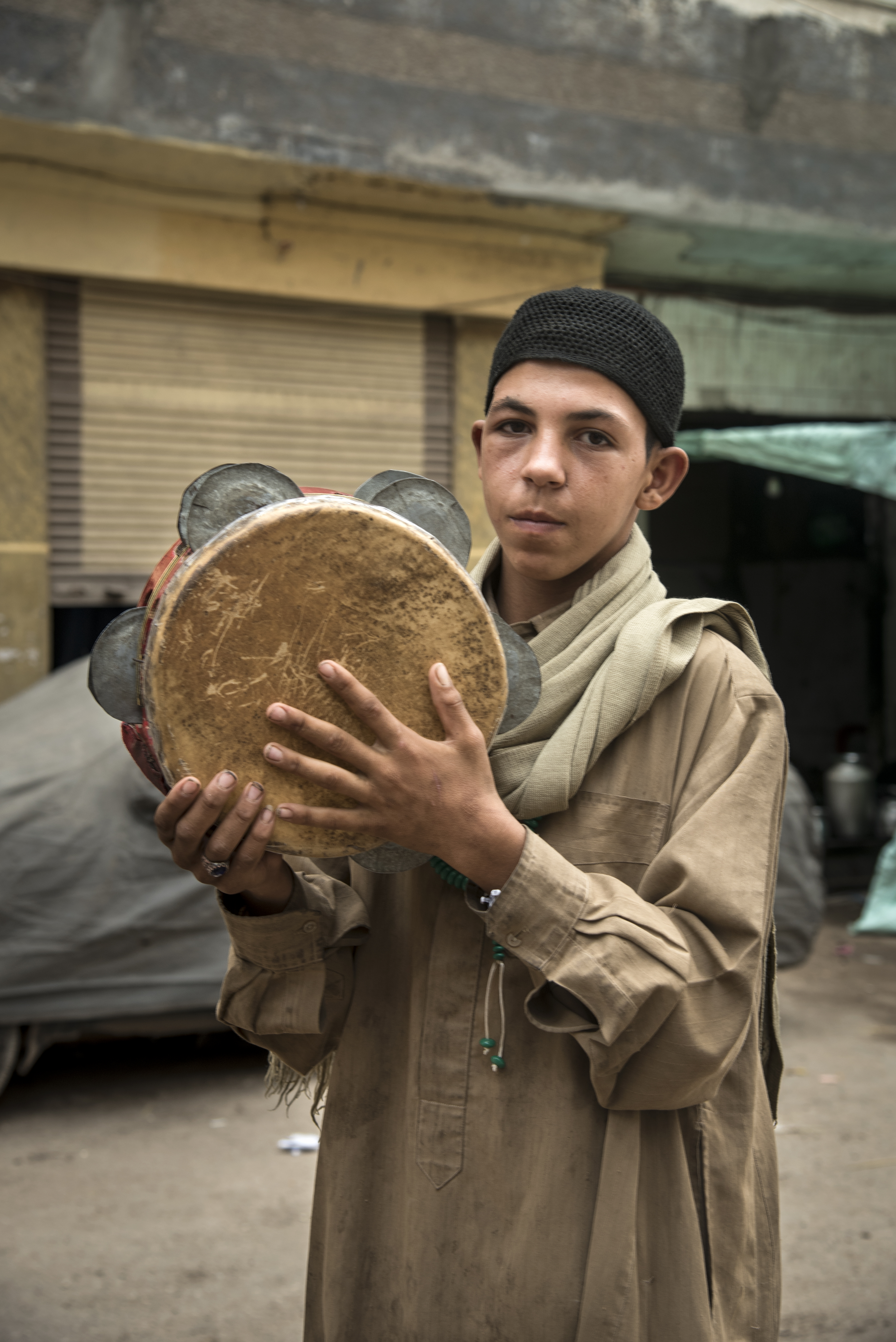
An Egyptian adolescent playing the riqq

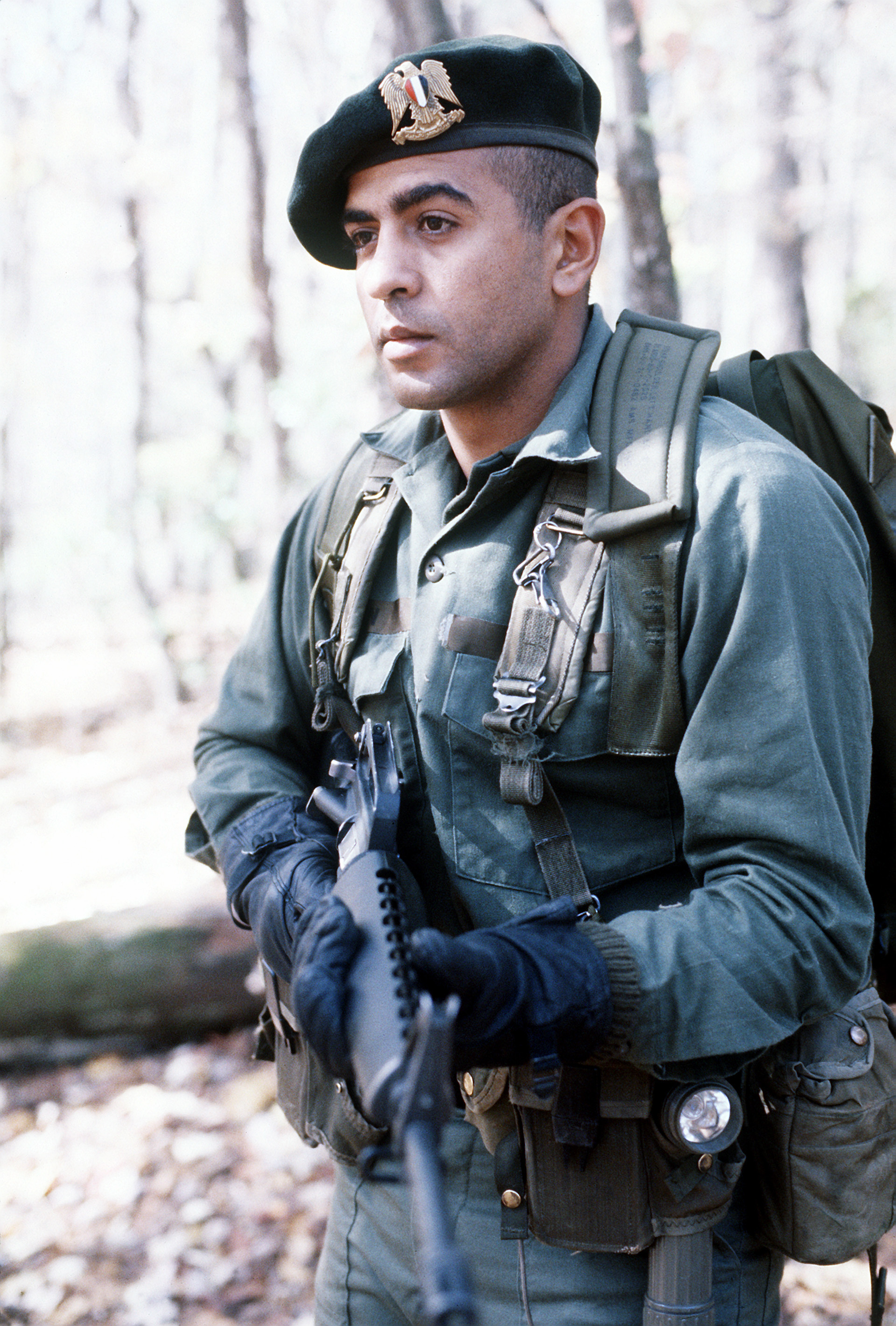
An Egyptian army lieutenant, 1982

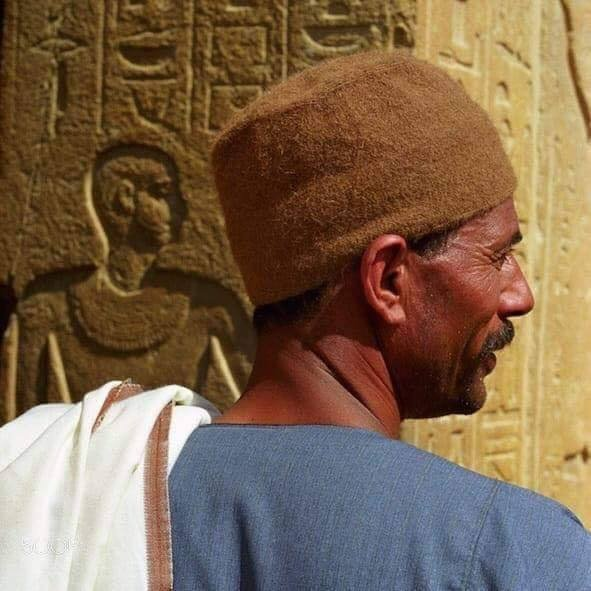
An Egyptian temple caretaker

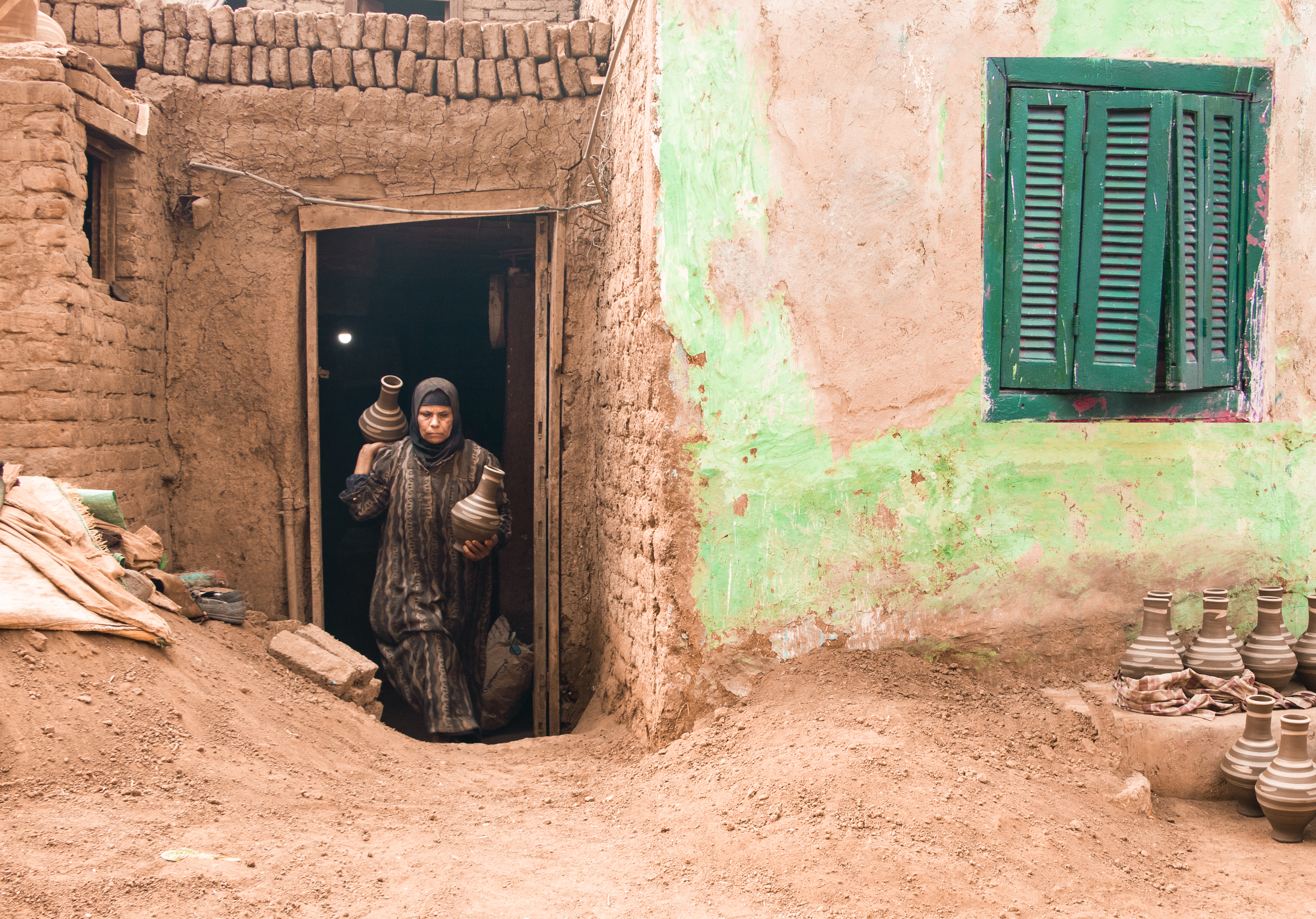
An Egyptian woman carrying clay pots

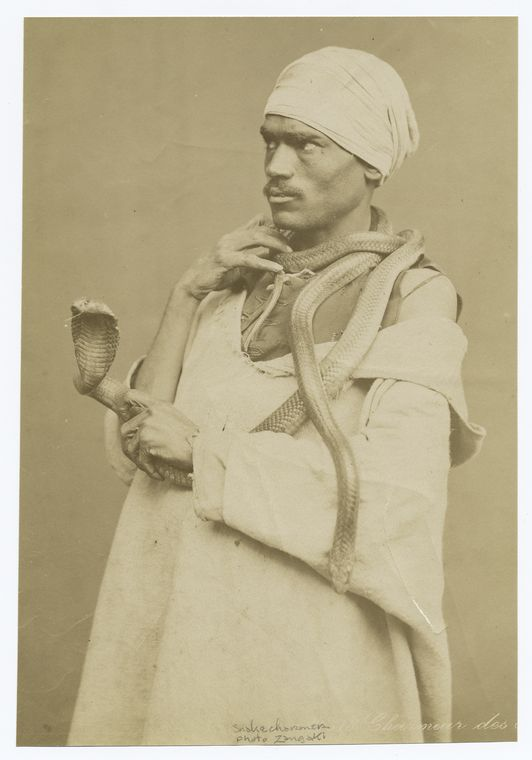
An Egyptian snake charmer, c. 1860–1920

== See also ==
- Copts
- Afro-Arabs
- Sa'idi people
- Nubians
- Beja people
- Siwi people
- Religion in Egypt
- List of Egyptians
- List of Egyptian Americans
- Egyptians in the United Kingdom
- Egyptian diaspora
- Egyptian nationalism

== Bibliography ==
- Barakat, Halim (1993). The Arab World: Society, Culture, and State. University of California Press. ISBN 0-520-08427-6. "Egyptian identity Arab."
- Hinnebusch, Raymond A. (2002). The Foreign Policies of Middle East States. Lynne Rienner Publishers. ISBN 1-58826-020-8. "Egyptian identity Arab."
- Robins, Gay (2008). The Art of Ancient Egypt (revised ed.). Harvard University Press. ISBN 978-0-674-03065-7.
