= Moroccans =

People of Morocco

Moroccans المغاربة ⵉⵎⵖⵔⵉⴱⵉⵢⵏ
- Map of the Moroccan diaspora in the world

Total population
- c. 40 million

Regions with significant populations
- Morocco; 36,828,330
- France: 1,314,000
- Spain: 1,026,371
- Belgium: 530,000
- Italy: 487,249
- Israel: 472,800 (Moroccan Jews)
- Netherlands: 419,272
- Germany: 240,000
- United States: 120,402
- Canada: 103,945
- United Arab Emirates: 100,000
- Libya: 100,000
- United Kingdom: 70,000
- Algeria: 63,000
- Saudi Arabia: 60,000
- Malaysia: 48,000
- Sweden: 17,602
- Norway: 13,008
- Denmark: 12,391
- Qatar: 9,000
- Switzerland: 7,270
- Ukraine: 7,000
- Brazil: 5,108
- Australia: 4,200
- Finland: 4,106
- Portugal: 4,000
- Oman: 4,000
- Russia: 3,400
- South Africa: 2,100
- Greece: 2,000
- Ivory Coast: 1,800
- Mauritania: 1,056
- Poland: 1,000
- Hungary: 1,000
- China: 1,000
- Mexico: 1,000
- Venezuela: 1,000
- New Caledonia: 1,000
- Gibraltar: 1,000
- Malta: 1,000

Languages
- Majority: Arabic (Darija, Modern Standard, Hassaniya, Saharan); Minority: Amazigh languages (Tashelhit, Tarifit, Tamazight)

Religion
- Majority: Sunni Islam; Minority: Non-denominational Islam, Shia Islam, Judaism, Christianity

Moroccans (Note: Arabic: المغاربة, romanized: al-Maġāriba; Standard Moroccan Tamazight: ⵉⵎⵖⵔⵉⴱⵉⵢⵏ) are the citizens and nationals of Morocco. The country's population is predominantly composed of Arabs and Berbers (Amazighs). The term also applies more broadly to those who share a common Moroccan culture and identity, as well as those who natively speak Moroccan Arabic, Amazigh languages, or other languages of Morocco.

In addition to the approximately 37 million residents of Morocco, there is a large Moroccan diaspora. Considerable Moroccan populations can be found in France, Spain, Belgium, Italy, and the Netherlands; with smaller notable concentrations in other Arab states, as well as Germany, the United Kingdom, the United States, and Canada.

== Ethnic groups ==
Moroccans are primarily of Arab and Berber origins (as in other countries of the Mediterranean Maghreb). The Higher Planning Commission, the country's state statistics bureau, does not collect data on ethnic demographics, citing the historical difficulty of distinguishing between Arabs and Berbers, even among Berber speakers.

According to 2024 census data, 92.7% of the population speaks Arabic, while 24.8% regularly speak an Amazigh variety. Despite the lack of official ethnic statistics, estimates typically put the Berber population as ranging between 35–60% of the population, with some estimates as high as 70%, while estimates of the Arab population range between 40–60%.

Ethnic map of Morocco (1973)

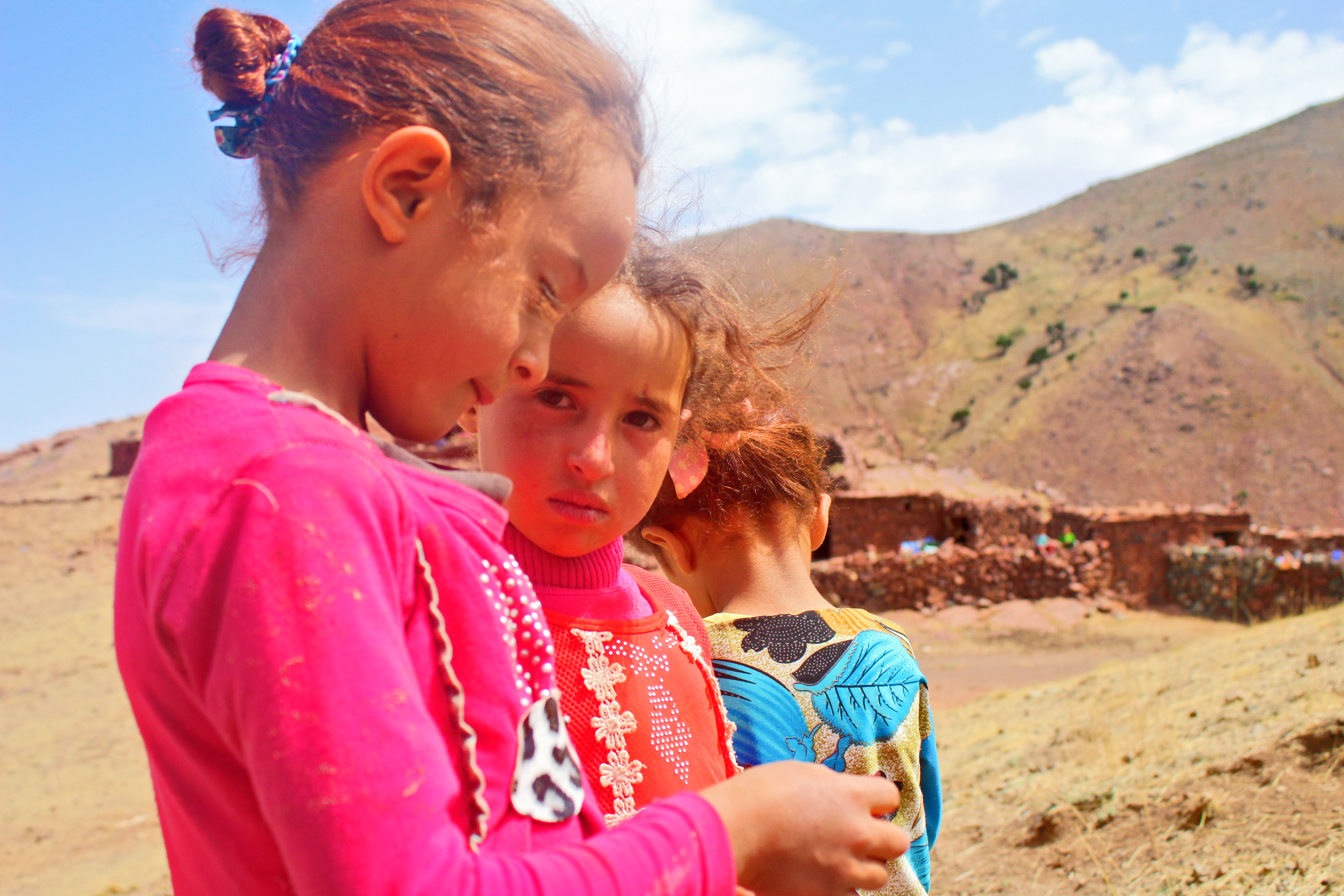
Berber girls from Morocco

Socially, there are two contrasting groups of Moroccans: those living in the cities and those in the rural areas. Among the rural, several classes have formed such as landowners, peasants, and tenant farmers. Moroccans live mainly in the north and west portions of Morocco. Historically and today, most Moroccans live in the country's most fertile regions near Morocco's Mediterranean and Atlantic coasts.

Between the Nile and the Red Sea were Arab tribes expelled from Arabia for their turbulence, Banu Hilal and Banu Sulaym, who often plundered farming areas in the Nile Valley.[19] The Arab population of Morocco is a result of the inflow of nomadic Arab tribes from the Arabian Peninsula since the Muslim conquest of the Maghreb in the 7th century with a major wave in the 11th century. Since the 7th century, the influx of Arab migrants from the Arabian Peninsula has contributed to shaping Morocco's demographic, cultural, and genetic landscape. The major migration to the region by Arab tribes was in the 11th century when the tribes of Banu Hilal and Banu Sulaym, along with others, were sent by the Fatimids to defeat a Berber rebellion and then settle in the Maghreb. According to Ibn Khaldun, whole tribes set off with women, children, ancestors, animals and camping equipment. These tribes, who arrived in the region of Morocco around the 12th-13th centuries, and later the Ma'qil in the 14th century, contributed to a more extensive ethnic, genetic, cultural, and linguistic Arabization of Morocco over time, especially beyond the major urban centres and the northern regions which were the main sites of Arabization up to that point.

Ethnic map of Morocco (1973)

The Berber population mainly inhabits the mountainous regions of Morocco where some preserve Berber culture, and are split into three groups; Rifians, Shilha, and Central Atlas Amazigh, who inhabit the Rif mountains, Anti-Atlas mountains, and Middle Atlas mountains respectively. The Berbers were an amalgamation of Ibero-Maurisian and a minority of Capsian stock blended with a more recent intrusion associated with the Neolithic Revolution. Out of these populations, the proto-Berber tribes formed during the late Paleolithic era. As a result of the influx of Arab nomads, some Berbers who sought the protection of the Bedouin became Arabized becoming Arabized Berbers.

A small minority of the population is identified as Haratin and Gnawa. These are sedentary agriculturalists of non-Arab and non-Berber origin, who inhabit the southern and eastern oases and speak either Berber or Arabic. Although it is commonly believed that all Haratins descend from West African slaves, some Haratins were native to southern Morocco descending from Black minority communities who have long inhabited the Draa. The Trans-Saharan slave trade brought a population of Black Sub-Saharan Africans to Morocco.

Millions of northern Moroccans are descendants of Morisco and Sephardic Jewish refugees, who were expelled from Spain during the Reconquista. Following the 1948 founding of Israel and start of the Arab-Israeli conflict, many Jewish Moroccans felt compelled to leave Morocco (particularly after anti-Jewish riots in Oujda) and immigrated to Israel-Palestine, Europe, and North America. By 1967, more than 250,000 Jewish Moroccans left the country.

== History ==
=== Early Arab era (670–1031) ===
In 670 AD, the first Arab conquest of the Maghreb's Mediterranean coastal plain took place under Uqba ibn Nafi, a general serving under the Umayyad Caliphate, marking the first wave of Arab migration to Morocco. Arab tribes such as Banu Muzaina migrated, and the Arab Muslims in the region had more impact on the culture of the Maghreb than the region's conquerors before and after them. The Umayyads brought their language, their system of government, and Islam to Morocco and many Berbers converted to Islam. The first independent state in the area of modern Morocco was the Emirate of Nekor, an Arab emirate in north Morocco ruling as a client state of the Umayyad Caliphate. It was founded by the Himyarite descendant Salih ibn Mansur in 710. After the outbreak of the Berber Revolt in 739, the Berbers formed other independent states such as the Emirate of Sijilmasa and the Barghawata Confederation.

After the Battle of Fakhkh in 786, Idris ibn Abdallah, who traced his ancestry to Ali ibn Abi Talib, fled from the Arabian Peninsula to Morocco. He first went to Tangier before going to Walili and founding the Arab Idrisid dynasty in 788, ruling most of Morocco. The Idrisids established Fes as their capital and Morocco became a centre of Muslim learning and a major regional power. The Idrisids were ousted in 927 by the Fatimid Caliphate and their Miknasa allies. After Miknasa broke off relations with the Fatimids in 932, they were removed from power by the Maghrawa of Sijilmasa in 980. In 973, the Caliphate of Cordoba under the Umayyads took over parts of Morocco.

=== Berber dynasties (1053–1549) ===
From the 11th century onwards, a series of dynasties of Berber origin arose. Under the Almoravid dynasty and the Almohad dynasty dominated the Maghreb, much of present-day Spain and Portugal, and the western Mediterranean region. In the 13th and 14th centuries the Merinids held power in Morocco and strove to replicate the successes of the Almohads by military campaigns in Algeria and Iberia. They were followed by the Wattasids. In the 15th century, the Reconquista ended Muslim rule in central and southern Iberia and many Muslims and Jews fled to Morocco. Portuguese efforts to control the Atlantic coast in the 15th century did not greatly affect the interior of Morocco. According to Elizabeth Allo Isichei, "In 1520, there was a famine in Morocco so terrible that for a long time other events were dated by it. It has been suggested that the population of Morocco fell from 5 to under 3 million between the early sixteenth and nineteenth centuries."

=== Arab dynasties (1549–present) ===
The major migration to the region by Arab tribes was in the 11th century when the tribes of Banu Hilal and Banu Sulaym, along with others, were sent by the Fatimids to defeat a Berber rebellion and then settle in the Maghreb. These tribes advanced in large numbers all the way to Morocco, contributing to a more extensive ethnic, genetic, cultural, and linguistic Arabization in the region. The Arab tribes of Maqil migrated to the Maghreb a century later and even immigrated southwards to Mauritania.

From 1549, a series of Arab dynasties arose. First the Saadian dynasty who ruled from 1549 to 1659, and then the 'Alawi dynasty, who remain in power since the 17th century. Both dynasties are Sharifian.

Under the Saadian dynasty, the country repulsed Ottoman incursions and a Portuguese invasion at the battle of Ksar el Kebir in 1578. The reign of Ahmad al-Mansur brought new wealth and prestige to the Sultanate, and a large expedition to West Africa inflicted a crushing defeat on the Songhay Empire in 1591. However, managing the territories across the Sahara proved too difficult. After the death of al-Mansur the country was divided among his sons. The Saadi dynasty is credited with the birth of a Moroccan national consciousness. Historian Dahiru Yahaya describes it as the "most lasting impact that the Saʿdīs had upon Morocco".

In 1666, Morocco was reunited by the Arab 'Alawi dynasty, who have been the ruling house of Morocco ever since. Morocco was facing aggression from Spain and the Ottoman Empire lies pressing westward. The 'Alawis succeeded in stabilizing their position, and while the kingdom was smaller than previous ones in the region, it remained quite wealthy. Against the opposition of local tribes Ismail Ibn Sharif (1672–1727) began to create a unified state.

Morocco was the first nation to recognize the fledgling United States as an independent nation in 1777. In the beginning of the American Revolution, American merchant ships in the Atlantic Ocean were subject to attack by the Barbary pirates. On 20 December 1777, Morocco's Sultan Mohammed III declared that American merchant ships would be under the protection of the sultanate and could thus enjoy safe passage. The Moroccan–American Treaty of Friendship, signed in 1786, stands as the U.S.'s oldest non-broken friendship treaty.

== Genetic composition ==
Population	Language	n	E	G	I	J1	L	N	R1	T	Reference
Morocco	AA (Semitic)	51	73	—	—	20	—	—	4	—	Onofri et al. 2008
Arabs (Morocco)	AA (Semitic)	87	52.8	—	—	26.4	—	—	—	—	Fadhlaoui-Zid et al. 2013
Arabs (Morocco)	AA (Semitic)	28	14.3	—	3.6	60.7	—	—	17.8	—	Underhill et al. 2000
Arabs (Morocco)	AA (Semitic)	49	72.7	—	0.0	20.4	—	—	0	—	Semino et al. 2004
Berbers (North Morocco)	AA (Berber)	63	87	—	—	11.1	—	—	—	—	Bosch et al. 2001
Berbers (Marrakesh)	AA (Berber)	29	92.9	—	—	—	—	—	—	—	Semino et al. 2000
Berbers (Middle Atlas)	AA (Berber)	69	87.1	—	—	5.8	—	—	—	—	Cruciani et al. 2004
Berbers (South Morocco)	AA (Berber)	62	98.5	—	0	10.0	0	0	—	0	Bosch et al. 2001
Berbers (Central Morocco)	AA (Berber)	40	93.8	—	0	11.1	0	0	—	0	Bosch et al. 2001
Rifians	AA (Berber)	54	—	—	—	—	—	—	—	—	Dugoujon 2005
Sahrawi (Morocco)	AA (Semitic)	89	59.5	—	—	20.2	—	—	—	—	Fregel et al. 2009
Jews (Morocco)	AA (Semitic)	19	21.1	26.3	—	31.5	—	—	10.5	—	Francalacci et al. 2008

== Geographic distribution ==
=== Morocco ===
Morocco has a population of around 37,076,584 inhabitants (2021 estimate). Morocco's population was 11.6 million in 1960. In 2024, 49.7% of the population is female, while 50.3% of it is male. According to the 2014 Morocco population census, there were around 84,000 immigrants in the country. Of these foreign-born residents, most were of French origin, followed by individuals mainly from various nations in West Africa and Algeria. There are also a number of foreign residents of Spanish origin. Some of them are descendants of colonial settlers, who primarily work for European multinational companies, while others are married to Moroccans or are retirees. Prior to independence, Morocco was home to half a million Europeans, most of whom were Christians. Also, prior to independence, Morocco was home to 250,000 Spaniards. Morocco's once prominent Jewish minority has decreased significantly since its peak of 265,000 in 1948, declining to around 3,500 in 2022.

=== Moroccan diaspora ===
Morocco has a large diaspora, most of which is located in France, which has reportedly over one million Moroccans of up to the third generation. There are also large Moroccan communities in Spain (about 700,000 Moroccans), the Netherlands (360,000), and Belgium (300,000). Other large communities can be found in Italy, Canada, the United States and Israel, where Moroccan Jews are thought to constitute the second biggest Jewish ethnic subgroup. Morocco is also the country with the largest Berber population in the world, with estimates typically ranging between 40–60% of the population.

== Culture ==
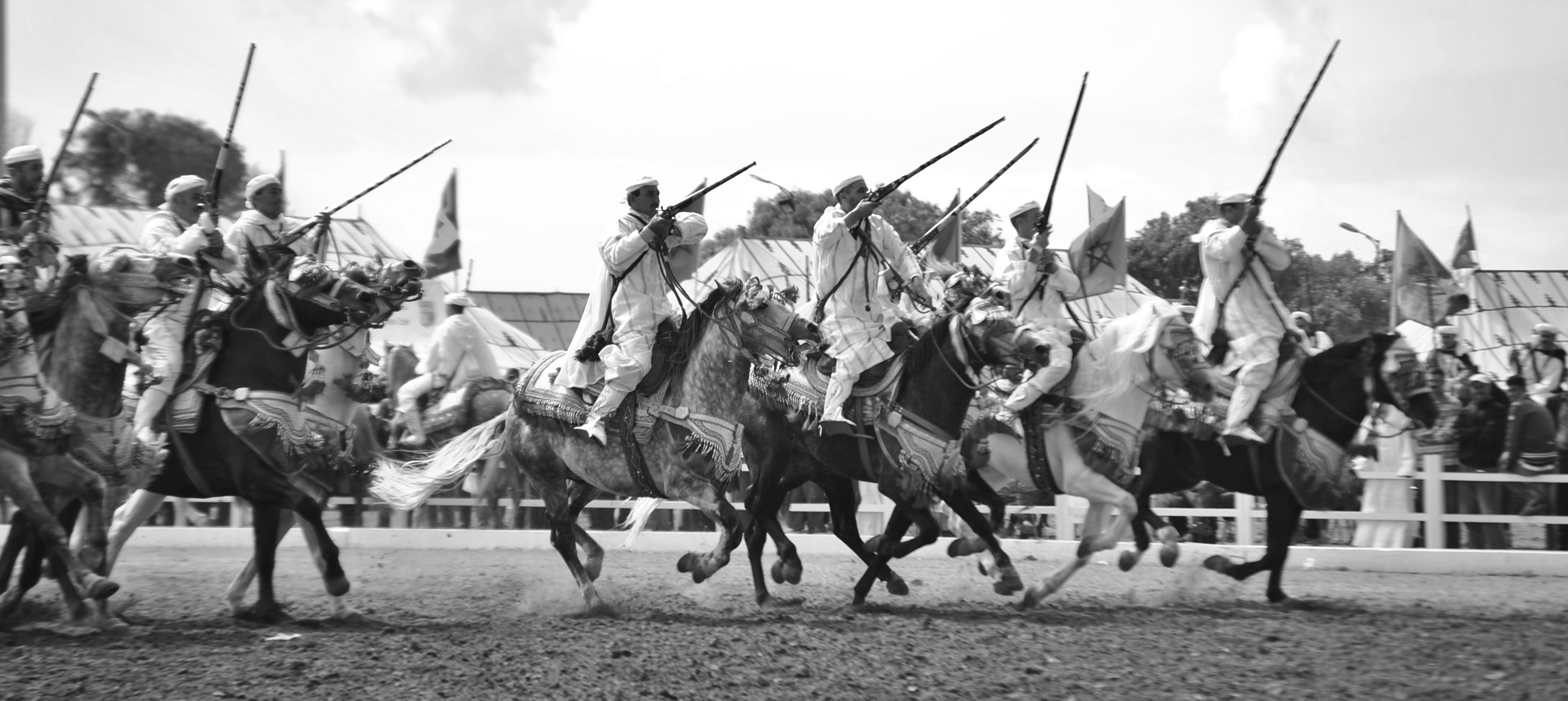
Taburida in Morocco

The culture of Morocco is a blend of Arab, Berber, Jewish, and Western European cultures. Through Moroccan history, the country had many cultural influences (Europe, Middle East and sub-Saharan Africa). The culture of Morocco shares similar traits with those of neighboring countries, particularly Algeria and Tunisia and to a certain extent Spain.

Each region possesses its own uniqueness, contributing to the national culture. Morocco has set among its top priorities the protection of its diversity and the preservation of its cultural heritage.

The traditional dress for men and women is called djellaba (جلابة), a long, loose, hooded garment with full sleeves. For special occasions, men also wear a red cap called a bernousse, more commonly known as a fez. Women wear kaftans decorated with ornaments. Nearly all men, and most women, wear balgha (بلغة). These are soft leather slippers with no heel, often dyed yellow. Women also wear high-heeled sandals, often with silver or gold tinsel.

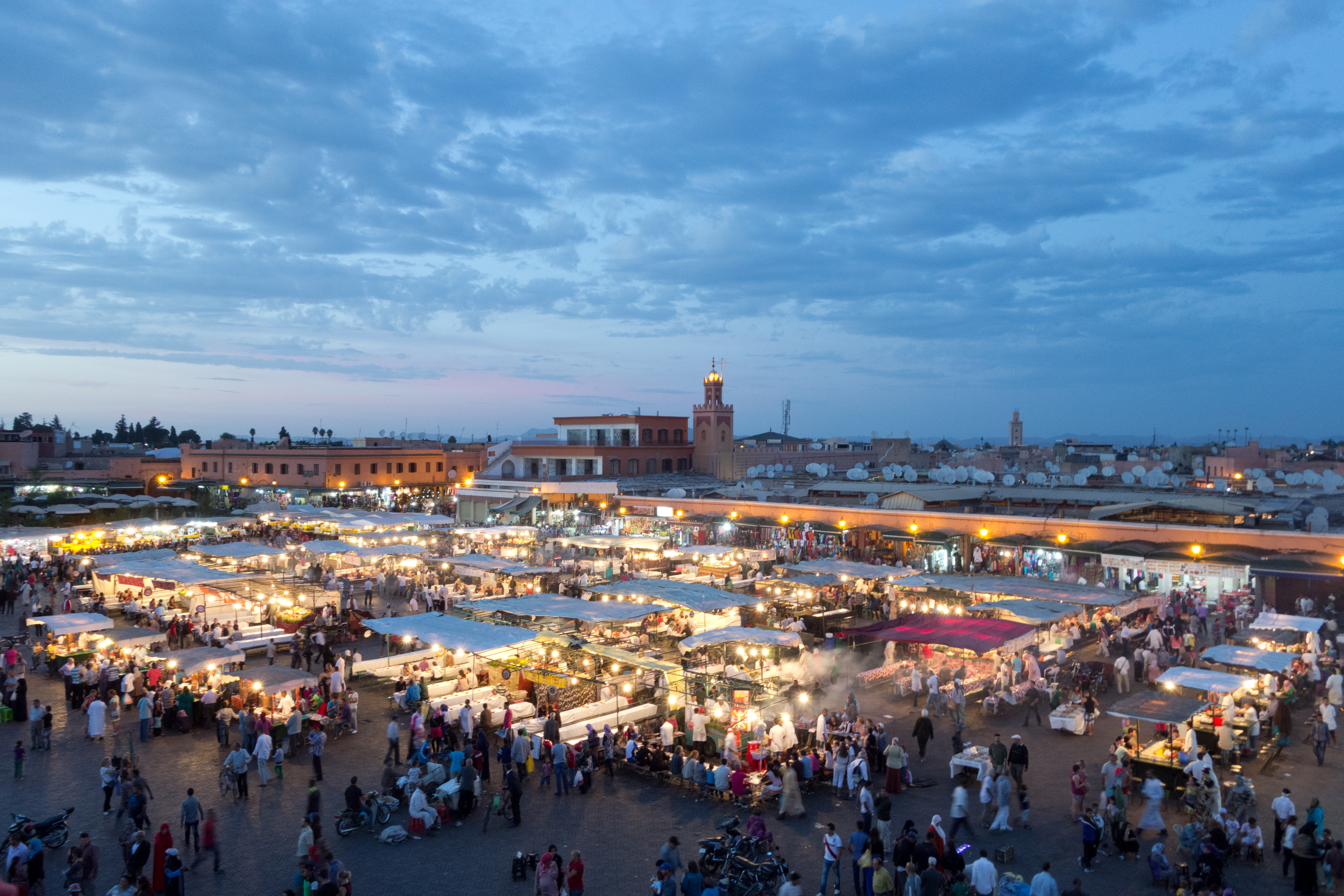
Jemaa el-Fnaa in the evening

Moroccan style is a new trend in decoration, which takes its roots from Moorish architecture. It has been made popular by the vogue of riad renovation in Marrakech. Dar is the name given to one of the most common types of domestic structures in Morocco; it is a home found in a medina, or walled urban area of a city. Dar exteriors are typically devoid of ornamentation and windows, except occasional small openings in secondary quarters, such as stairways and service areas. These piercings provide light and ventilation. Moroccan cuisine primarily consists of a blend of Arab, Berber, and Andalusi influences. It is known for dishes like couscous and pastilla, among others. Spices such as cinnamon are also used in Moroccan cooking. Sweets like halwa are popular, as well as other confections. Cuisines from neighboring areas have also influenced the country's culinary traditions. Additionally, Moroccan craftsmanship has a rich tradition of jewellery-making, pottery, leather-work and woodwork.

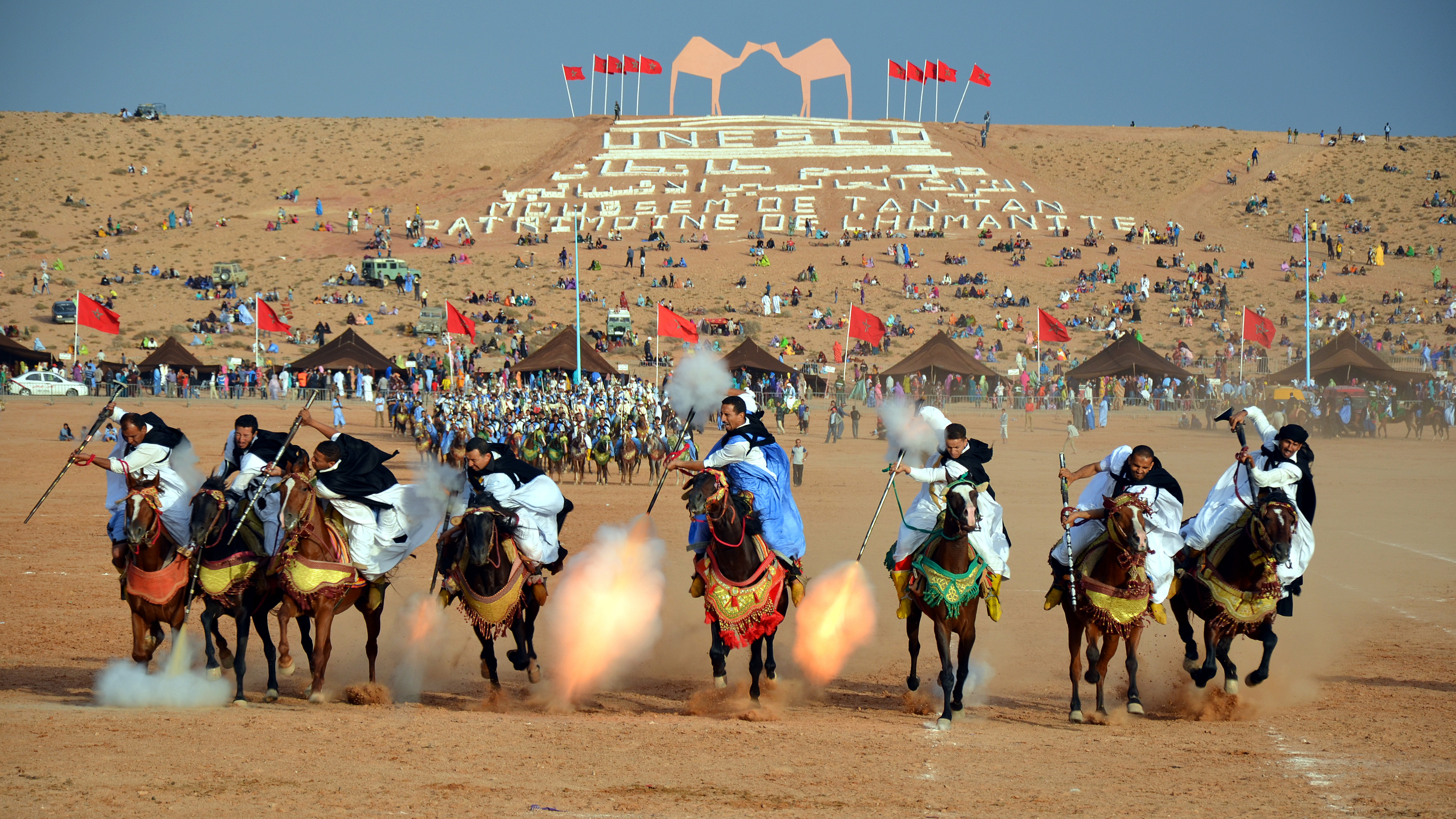
Fantasia in Morocco

The music of Morocco ranges and differs according to the various areas of the country. Moroccan music has a variety of styles from complex sophisticated orchestral music to simple music involving only voice and drums. There are three varieties of folk music: village and ritual music, and the music performed by professional musicians. Chaabi (الشعبي) is a music consisting of numerous varieties which descend from the multifarious forms of Moroccan folk music. Chaabi was originally performed in markets, but is now found at any celebration or meeting. Gnawa is a form of music that is mystical. It was gradually brought to Morocco by the Gnawa and later became part of the Moroccan tradition. Sufi brotherhoods (tariqas) are common in Morocco, and music is an integral part of their spiritual tradition. This music is an attempt at reaching a trance state which inspires mystical ecstasy.

=== Cuisine ===
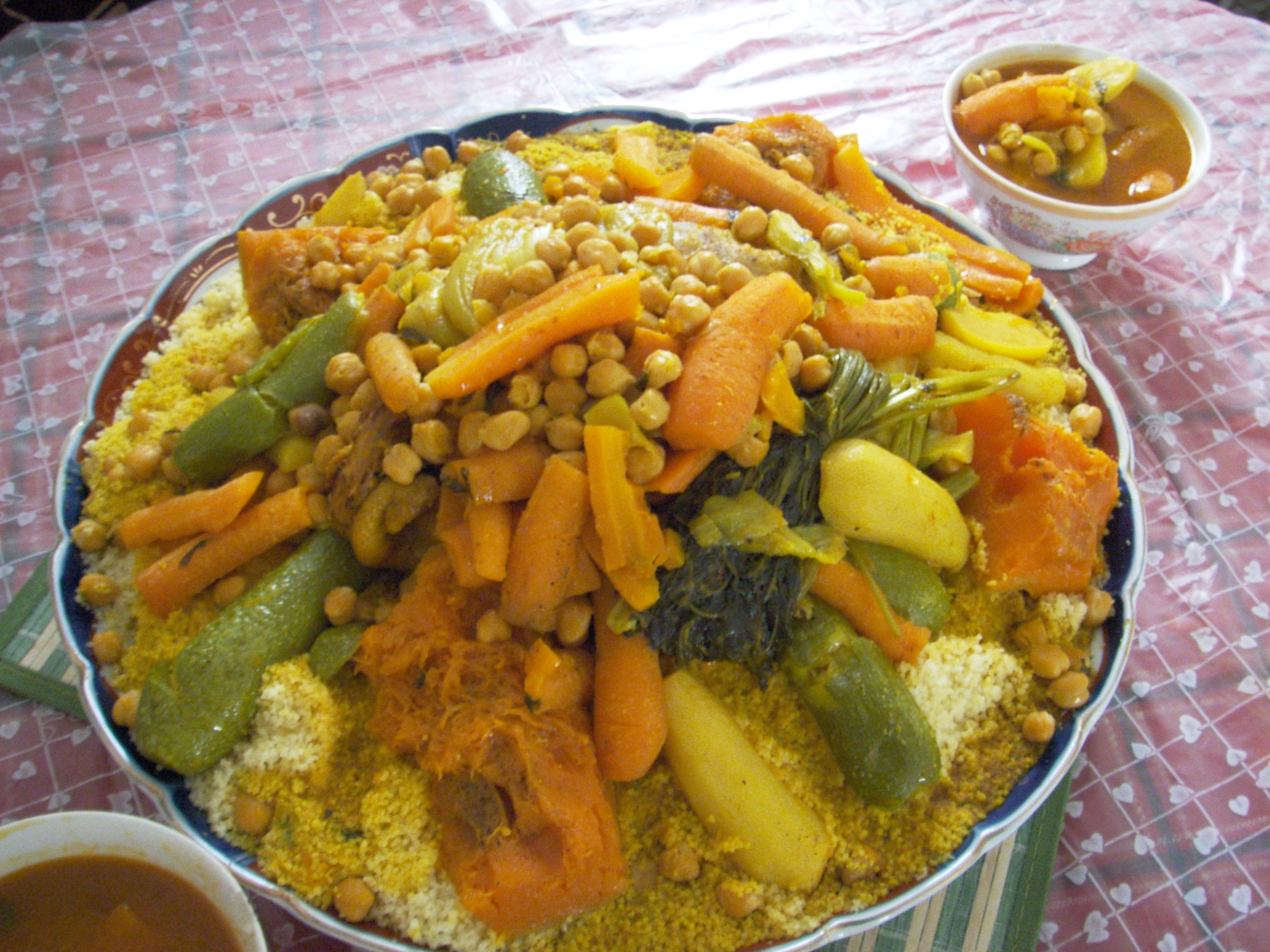
Moroccan Couscous

Moroccan cuisine is considered one of the most diversified cuisines in the world. This is a result of the centuries-long interaction of Morocco with the outside world. The cuisine of Morocco is mainly a fusion of Moorish, European and Mediterranean cuisines. Spices are used extensively in Moroccan cuisine. While spices have been imported to Morocco for thousands of years, many ingredients such as saffron from Tiliouine, mint and olives from Meknes, and oranges and lemons from Fez, are home-grown.

Chicken is the most widely eaten meat in Morocco. The most commonly eaten red meat in Morocco is beef; lamb is preferred but is relatively expensive. The main Moroccan dish most people are familiar with is couscous, the old national delicacy. Beef is the most commonly eaten red meat in Morocco, usually eaten in a tagine with vegetables or legumes. Chicken is also very commonly used in tagines; one of the most famous tagine is the tagine of chicken, potatoes and olives. Lamb is also consumed, but as Northwest African sheep breeds store most of their fat in their tails, Moroccan lamb does not have the pungent flavor that Western lamb and mutton have. Poultry is also very common, and the use of seafood is increasing in Moroccan food. In addition, there are dried salted meats and salted preserved meats such as kliia/khlia and "g'did" which are used to flavor tagines or used in "el ghraif", a folded savory Moroccan pancake.

Among the most famous Moroccan dishes are Couscous, Pastilla (also spelled Bsteeya or Bestilla), Tajine, Tanjia and Harira. Although the latter is a soup, it is considered a dish in itself and is served as such or with dates especially during the month of Ramadan. Pork consumption is forbidden in accordance with Sharia, religious laws of Islam.

A big part of the daily meal is bread. Bread in Morocco is principally from durum wheat semolina known as khobz. Bakeries are very common throughout Morocco and fresh bread is a staple in every city, town and village. The most common is whole grain coarse ground or white flour bread. There are also a number of flat breads and pulled unleavened pan-fried breads. The most popular drink is "atai", green tea with mint leaves and other ingredients.

== Languages ==
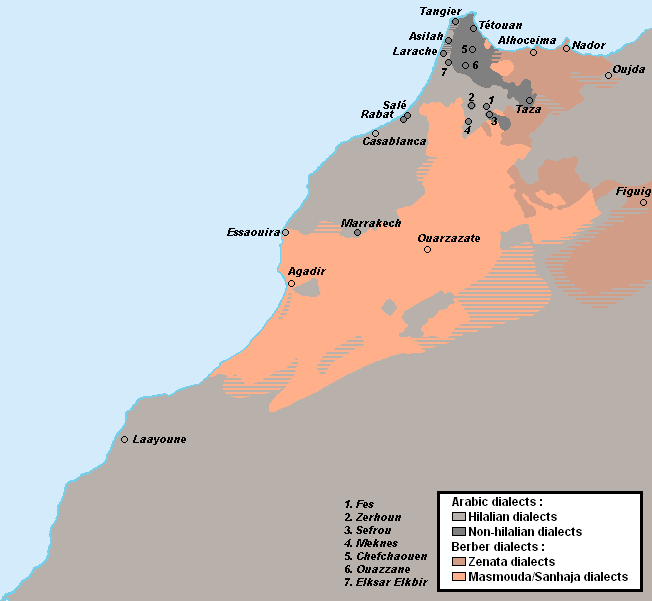
Linguistic map of Morocco

Morocco's official languages are Modern Standard Arabic and Berber.

The majority of the population speaks Moroccan Arabic. According to the 2024 Moroccan census, 92.7% of the population spoke Arabic, whereas 24.8% spoke Berber languages. The census also indicated that 99.2%, or almost the entire literate population of Morocco, could read and write in Arabic, while only 1.5% of the population could read and write in Berber. The census also reveals that 80.6% of Moroccans consider Arabic to be their native language, while 18.9% regard any of the various Berber languages as their mother tongue.

Hassaniya Arabic is spoken in the southern part of the country, spoken by over 200,000 people. Morocco has recently included the protection of Hassaniya in the constitution as part of the July 2011 reforms.

French is taught universally and still serves as Morocco's primary language of commerce and economics; it is also used in education, sciences, government and most education fields.

Spanish is also spoken in the northern and southern parts of the country as a secondary foreign language after French. Meanwhile, English is increasingly becoming more popular among the educated, particularly in the science fields.

== Religion ==
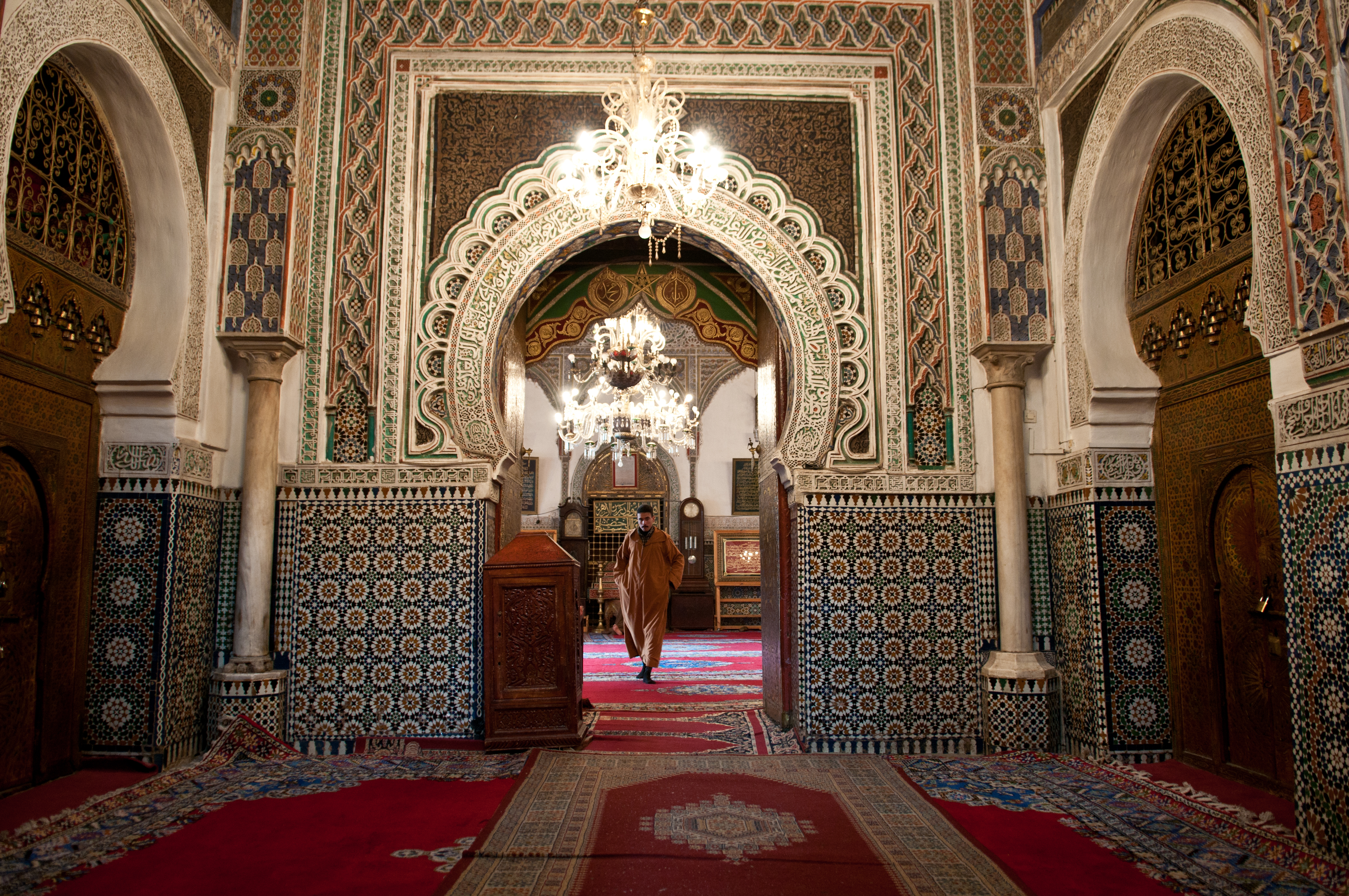
The interior of a mosque in Fes, Islam is the predominant religion in Morocco

The Hassan II Mosque in Casablanca

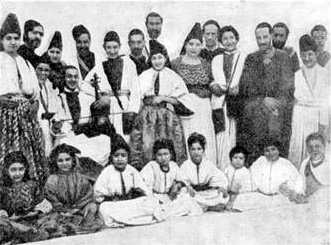
The Jews of Fez c. 1900, Judaism was the main minority religion in Morocco

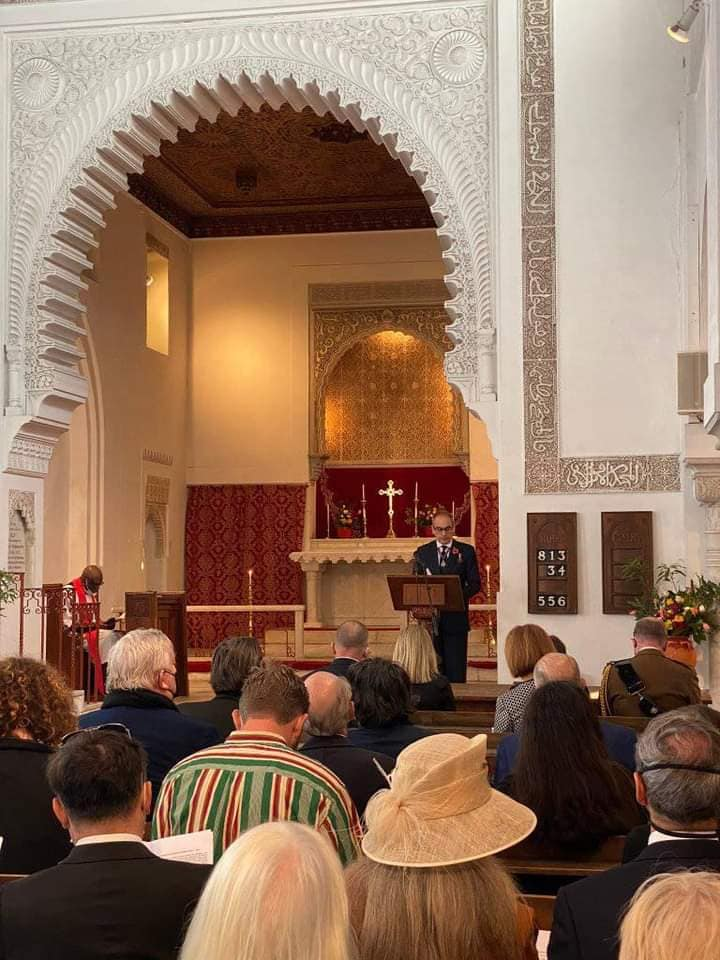
The St Andrew's Church in Tangier, an Anglican church built in 1894

In 2010, the Pew Forum estimated that 99% of Morocco's population was Muslim, with all other religious groups making up less than 1%. The majority of Moroccan Muslims follow the Maliki Sunni school of thought, while other significant groups include adherents of Zahirism and non-denominational Muslims. With a deep-rooted history in Morocco, Islam remains the dominant faith. Since Islamic culture profoundly influences Moroccan society, many Moroccans are considered nominal or cultural Muslims. The rhythm of life for Moroccans is dictated by religious celebrations throughout the year, such as Ramadan and Eid Al Adha. During these celebrations, most of them being public holidays, Moroccans focus on praying and spending time with their family. Moroccans also celebrate al-Mawlid al-Nabawi, the birthday of Muhammad, and the Islamic New Year.

Moroccan Jews form an ancient community dating back to Roman times, with Jewish migration to the region beginning as early as 70 CE. A second wave of Jewish immigrants arrived from the Iberian Peninsula during and after the issuance of the 1492 Alhambra Decree, which expelled Jews from Spain, followed shortly by their expulsion from Portugal. This wave significantly influenced Moroccan Jewry, leading to the widespread adoption of the Andalusian Sephardic liturgy and a shift toward a predominantly Sephardic identity. Before the establishment of the State of Israel in 1948, Morocco had approximately 265,000 Jews, making it home to the largest Jewish community in the Muslim world. Today, the historic Jewish community of Morocco is estimated to number around 2,000. The majority of Moroccan Jews emigrated, primarily to Israel and France. As of 2019, Israel was home to approximately 472,800 Jews of Moroccan descent, accounting for around 5% of the country's total population.

Christianity in Morocco dates back to Roman times when it was practiced by Christian Berbers in the Roman province of Mauretania Tingitana. However, its presence began to decline following the Islamic conquests in the 7th century. Indigenous Christianity in North Africa persisted after the Muslim conquest until the early 15th century. During the French and Spanish protectorates, Morocco had a significant Catholic population. On the eve of independence, an estimated 470,000 Catholics lived in the country, and Catholicism held a strong historical legacy and influence. Today, Christianity is the second-largest religion in Morocco. The number of Moroccan converts to Christianity, most of whom practice in secret, is estimated to range between 8,000 and 50,000. Since the 1960s, an increasing number of Moroccan Muslims have converted to Christianity. Additionally, among the Moroccan diaspora, there are Christian communities; for example, according to a 2020 national survey conducted by INSEE, 5% of people of Moroccan origin in France identified as Christian.

== See also ==
- Moroccan diaspora
- Genetic history of the Iberian Peninsula
- Expulsion of the Moriscos
- List of Moroccans
- Moroccan Americans
- Media related to People of Morocco at Wikimedia Commons
