= Moroccans in Belgium =

Total population
- 429,580 (2012)

Regions with significant populations
- Belgium; Morocco

Languages
- French, Dutch, Moroccan Arabic, Rifian, Shilha, Spanish, Italian

Religion
- Islam; Minority: Judaism, Irreligion, Christianity

Related ethnic groups
- Arabs and Berbers in Belgium

Moroccans and people of Moroccan descent, who come from various ethnic groups, form a distinct community in Belgium and part of the wider Moroccan diaspora. They represent the second largest (after Italians) immigrant population in Belgium and are widely referred to as Belgo-Marocains in French and Belgische Marokkanen in Dutch.

== History ==
Moroccan-born population in Belgium
Year	Pop.	±%
1961	461	—
1970	39,294	+8423.6%
1981	105,133	+167.6%
1991	142,098	+35.2%
2002	90,642	−36.2%

There has been a Moroccan presence in Belgium since 1912 when France began recruiting workers from its North African colonies as immigrant workers (among them Moroccans), allowing some to cross into Belgium. At the time, Morocco was a largely agrarian economy and labour migration was attractive to many young men. There were thought to be 6,000 Moroccans living in Belgium by 1930, predominantly in industrial towns in Wallonia.

The rapid recovery of the Belgian economy after World War II (Trente Glorieuses) was benefited by the rapid revival of coal mining (-> Nord-Pas de Calais Mining Basin) and heavy industry which experienced an acute labour shortage. As a response, the Belgian government entered into various guest worker programmes aimed at encouraging workers to travel to Belgium on work contracts. The first such agreement was made with Italy in 1946 but the arrangement collapsed in 1956 after large-scale loss of life among Italian workers in the Marcinelle mining disaster. Similar agreements were concluded with Spain (1956), with the Kingdom of Greece (1957) and with Turkey (1964). Belgium also began to look to recruiting migrant workers from North Africa from 1957. As long as the Algerian War was ongoing (it ended in 1962 with the Évian Accords), the process was complicated.

A guest worker agreement was signed with Morocco on 17 August 1964. This made Morocco the first North African state to make such an agreement with Belgium. In following years significant numbers of Moroccan workers, mainly single men, were recruited for work in Belgium. The program was cancelled in August 1974 amid the fall in demand during the 1973–1975 recession and Belgium's escalating deindustrialisation. However, the spread of family reunification and high birth rates led to the rapid expansion of the community after the scheme's abolition. In following years, there was also immigration into Belgium from students and political dissidents opposed to the regime of King Hassan II.

As of 2012, almost 500,000 Moroccan migrants had made it to Belgium, almost half of them acquired citizenship in their new-found home. In 2022, Belgians of Moroccan descent accounted for roughly 13% of the capital's population.

As of 2023, there were a total of 699,296 North Africans in Belgium, of which a majority are Moroccans. A total of 258,603 North Africans resided in the Brussels-Capital Region, and 120,356 resided in Antwerp. A total of 275,421 North Africans resided in Flanders and a total of 165,272 North Africans resided in Wallonia.

Number of Moroccans in larger cities
#	City	People
1.	Brussels	34,984
2.	Antwerp	11,780
3.	Liège	7,634
4.	Charleroi	5,403
5.	Namur	2,836

== Community ==
Moroccans form a major immigrant ethnic group in Belgium. The number of people with at least one parent born with Moroccan nationality was 430,000 on 1 January 2012, or about 4 percent of the national population. This proportion was 6.7% among those under 15 years of age. Belgium also represents one of the most important centres of the Moroccan diaspora. The Brussels-Capital Region has the most Moroccans in Belgium (45%), followed by Antwerp (22.7%), Liège (8.8%) and Charleroi (5.2%).

A large majority of Moroccans in Belgium originate from northern Morocco (Al Hoceima, Nador, Tangier, Tetouan and Oujda).

It was reported in 2019 that six Moroccan-Belgians had been elected to the Chamber of Representatives and 21 in regional parliaments.

It was reported in 2020 that more than 1,500 Moroccan-Belgian dual nationals in Morocco had request repatriation to Belgium during the COVID-19 pandemic.

There is a small Moroccan Jewish community which runs the Judeo-Moroccan Cultural Centre (Centre de la Culture judéo-marocaine, CCJM) in Brussels.

== Notable people ==
=== Members of parliament or of government ===
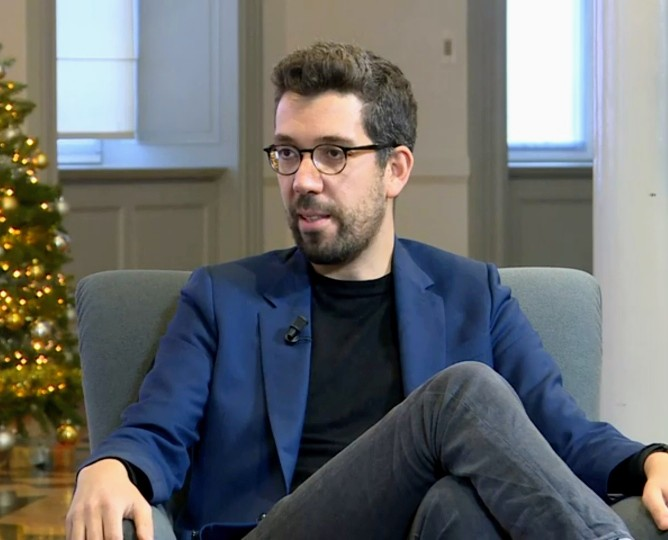
Imade Annouri

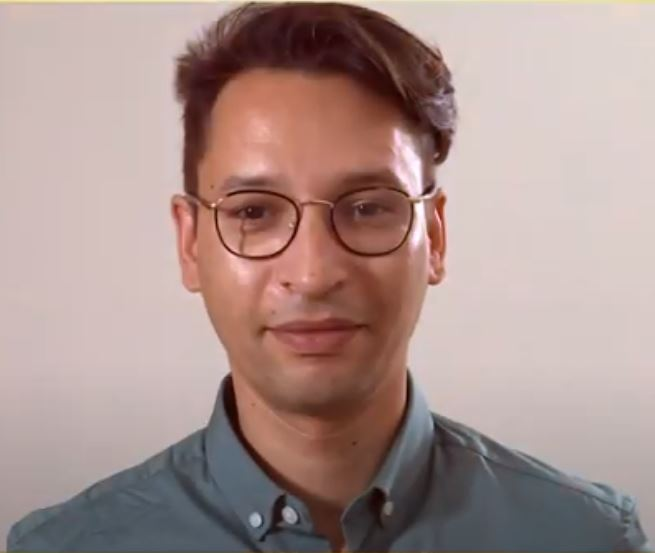
Fourat Ben Chikha

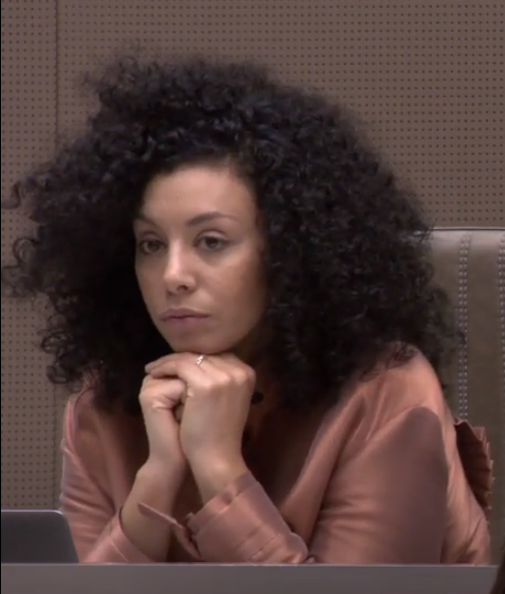
Sihame El Kaouakibi

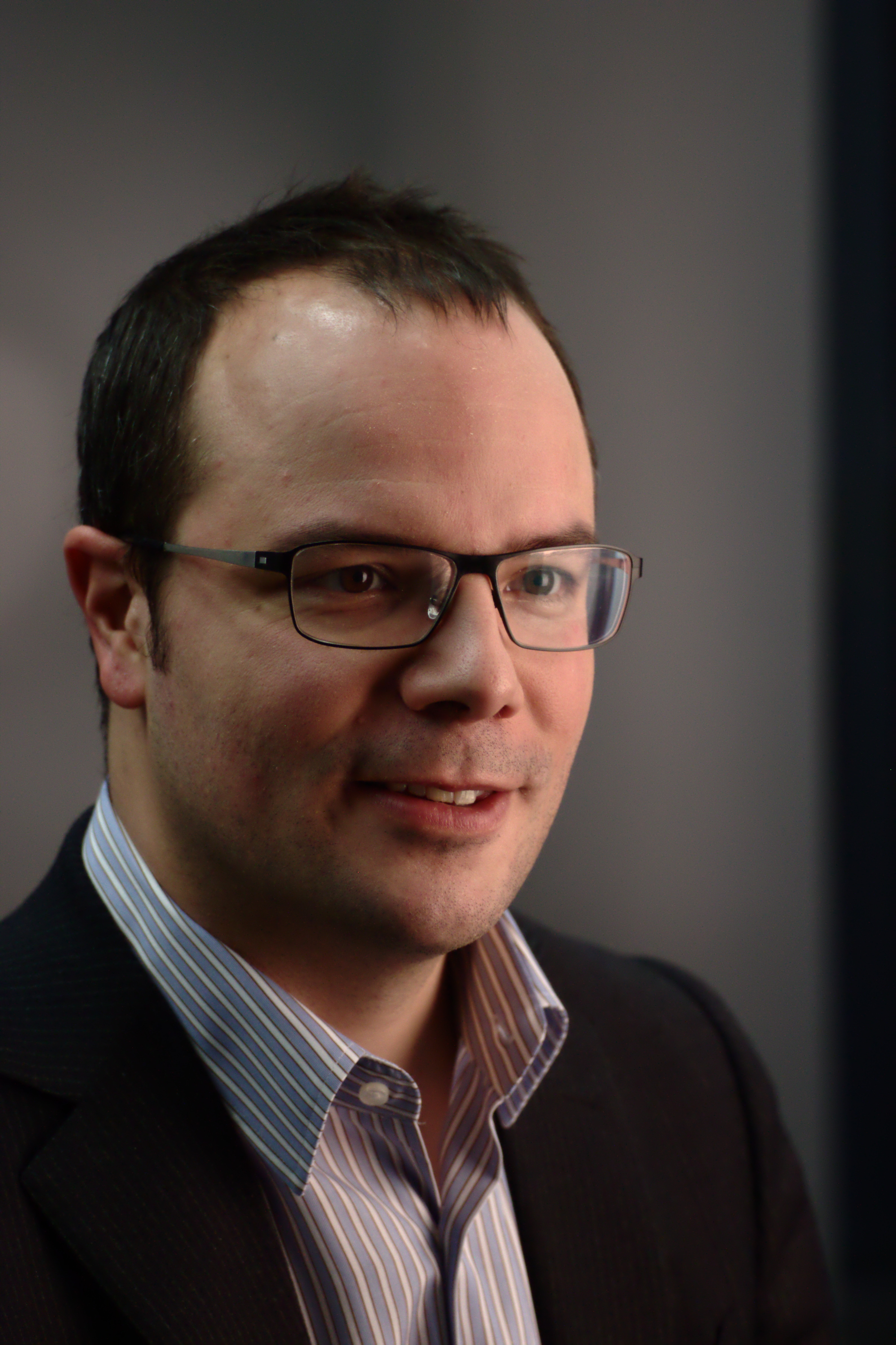
Saïd El Khadraoui

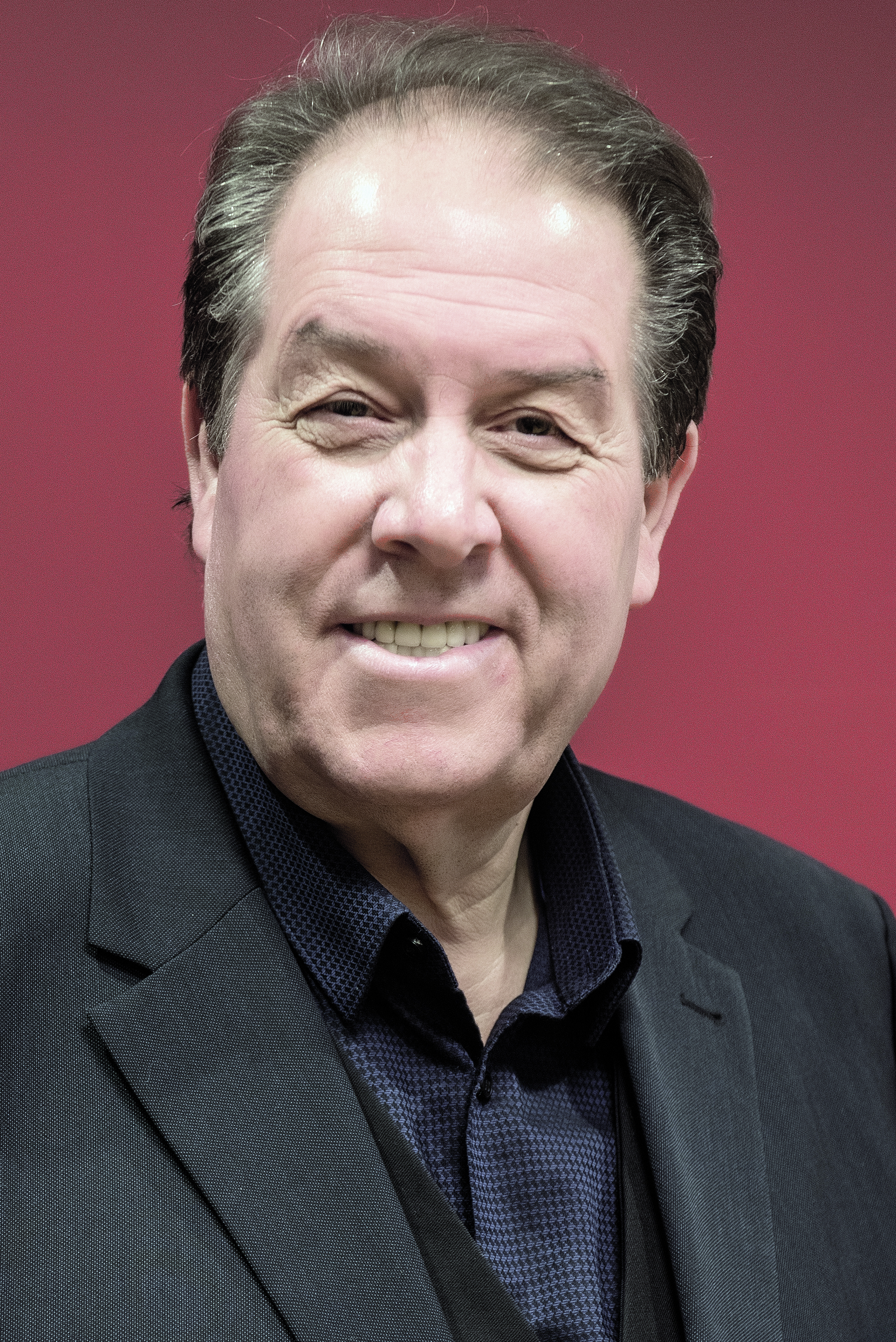
Ahmed El Ktibi

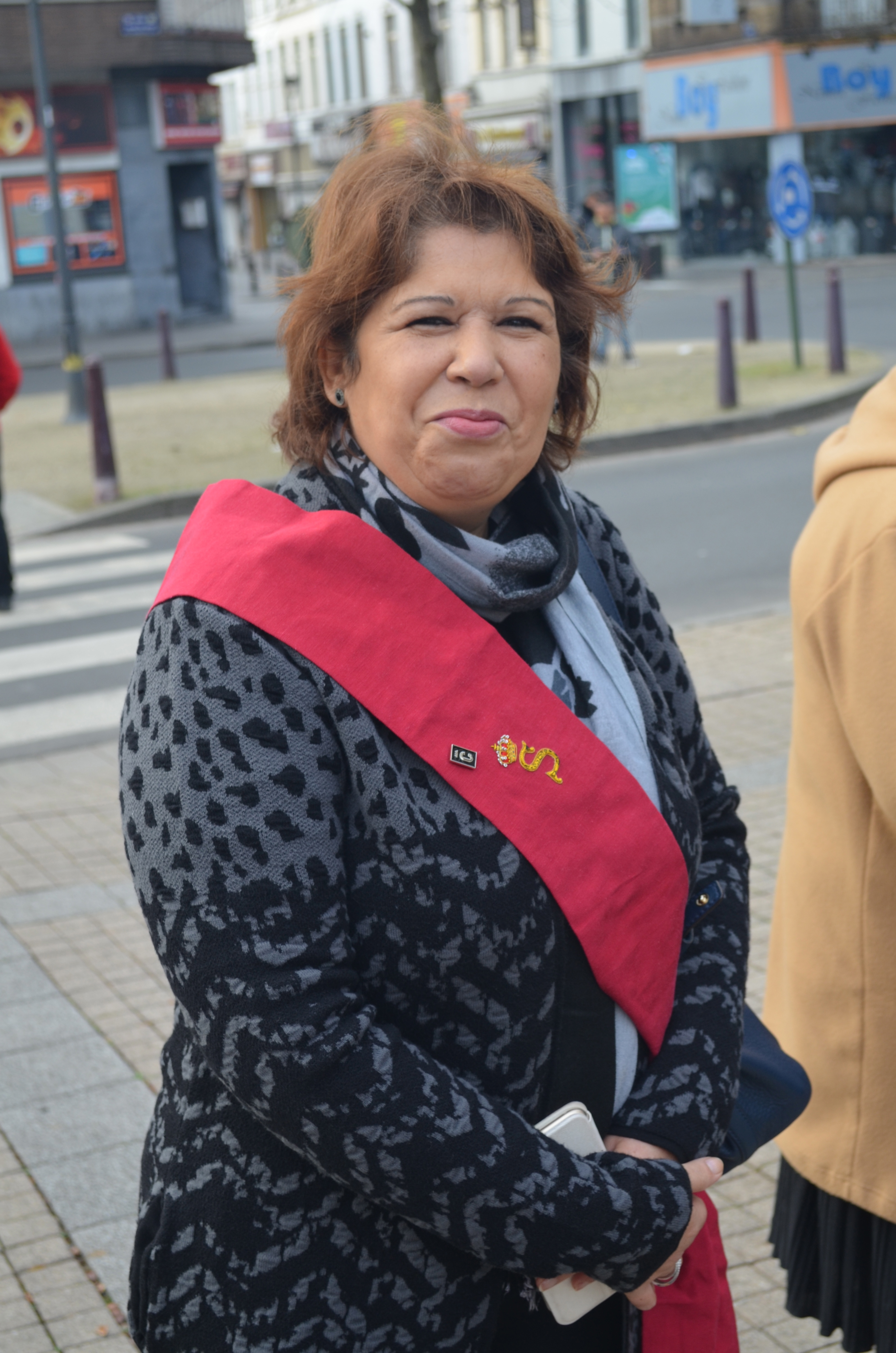
Latifa Gahouchi

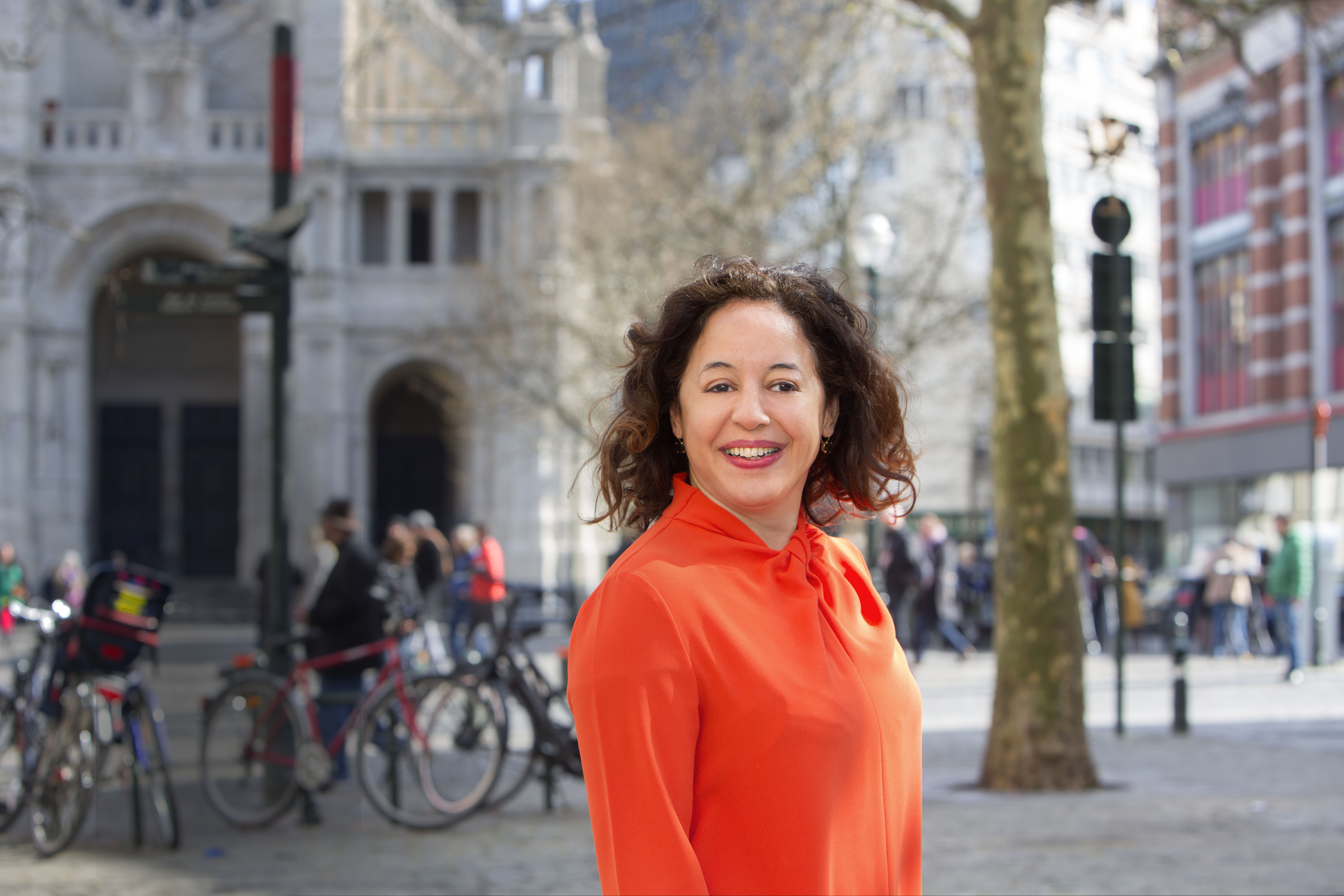
Yamila Idrissi

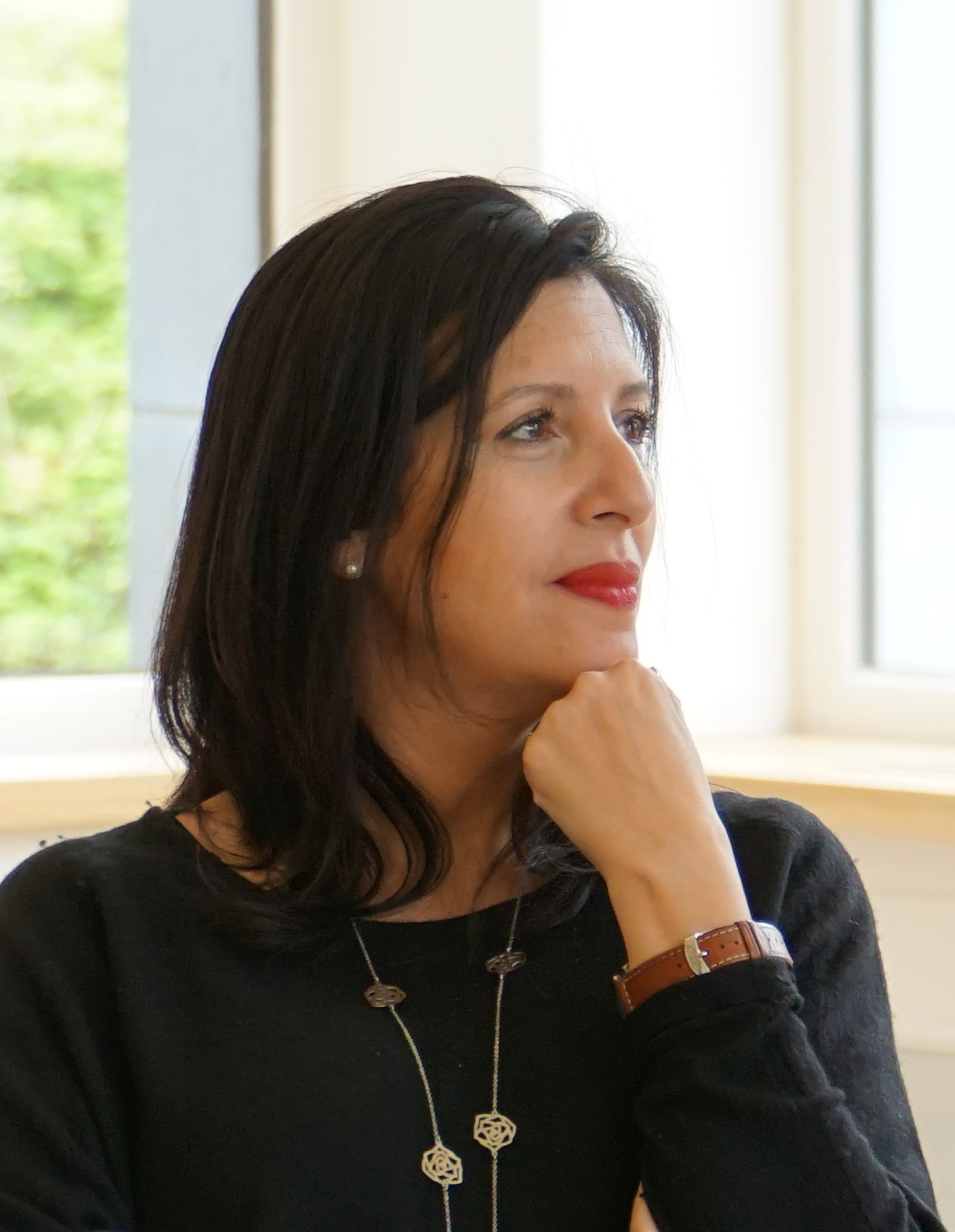
Zakia Khattabi

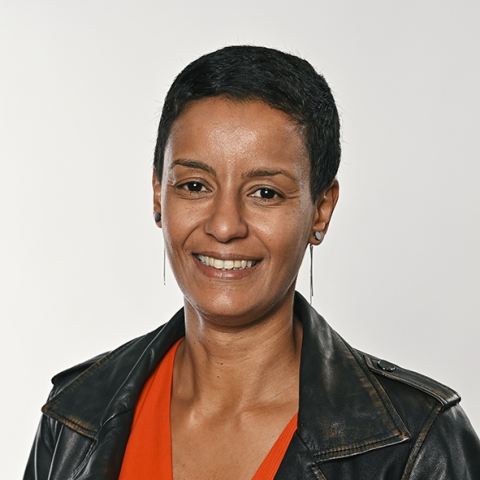
Meryame Kitir

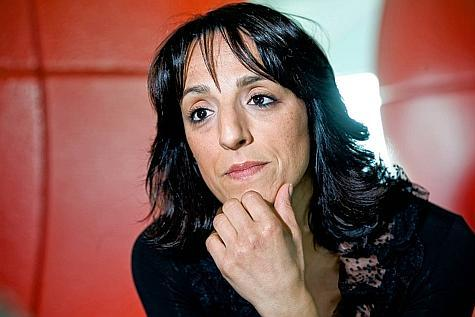
Fadila Laanan

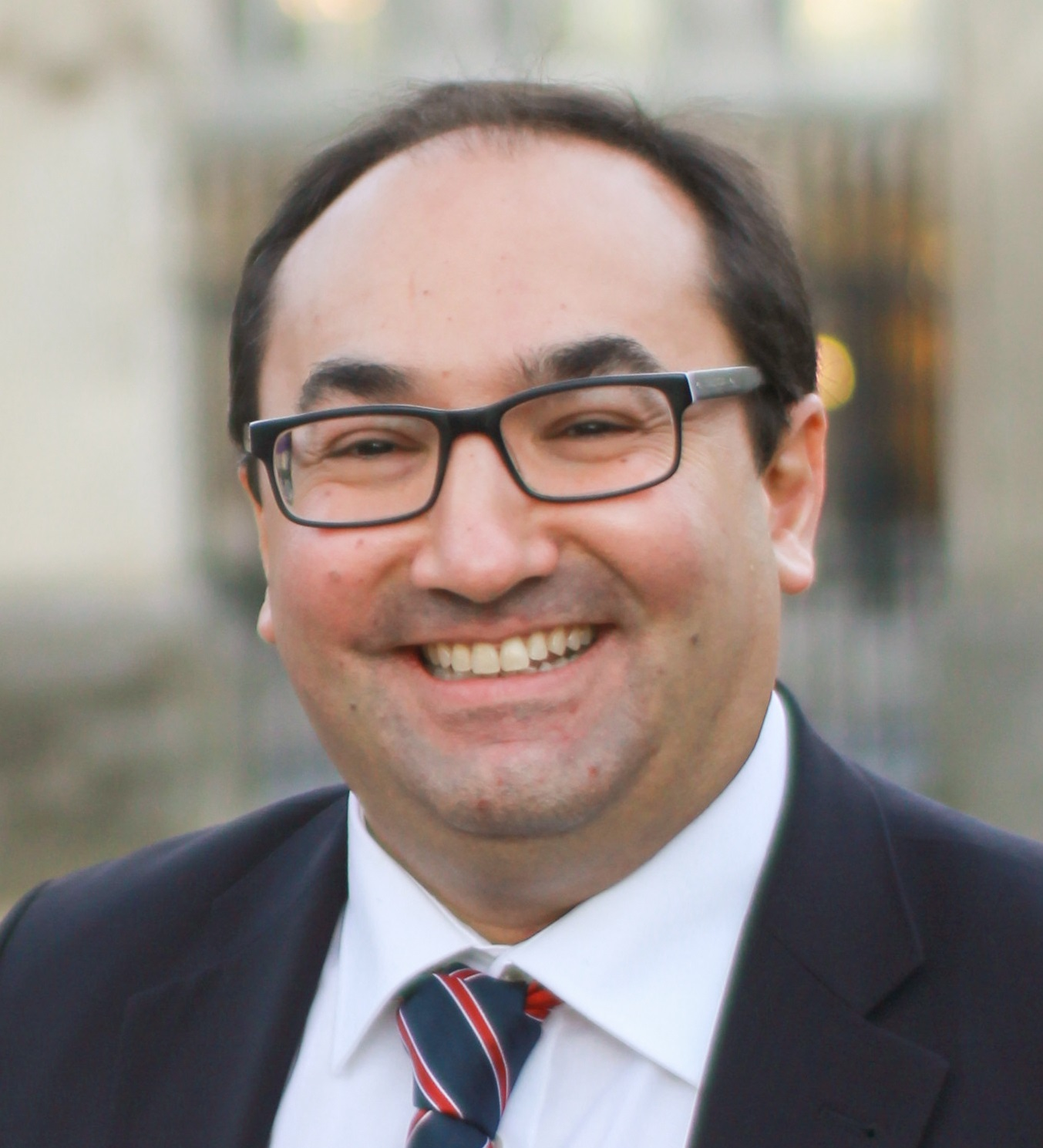
Ahmed Laaouej

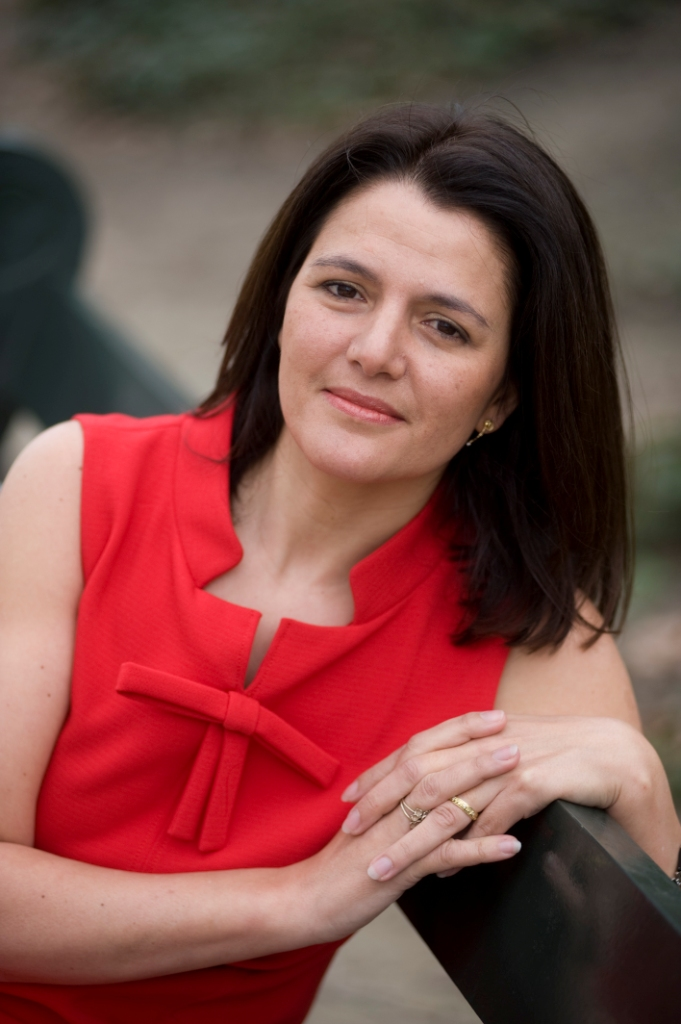
Nahima Lanjri

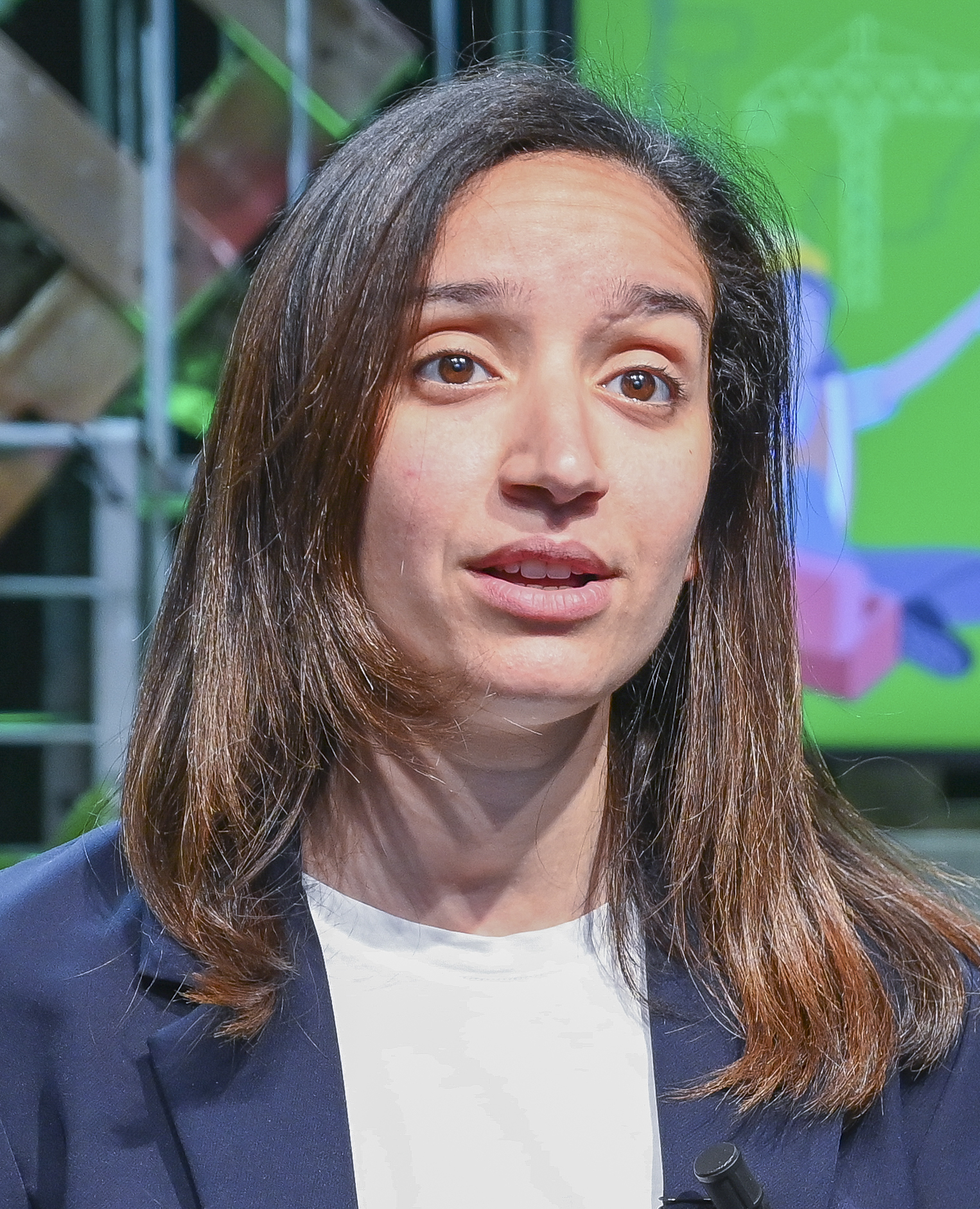
Rajae Maouane

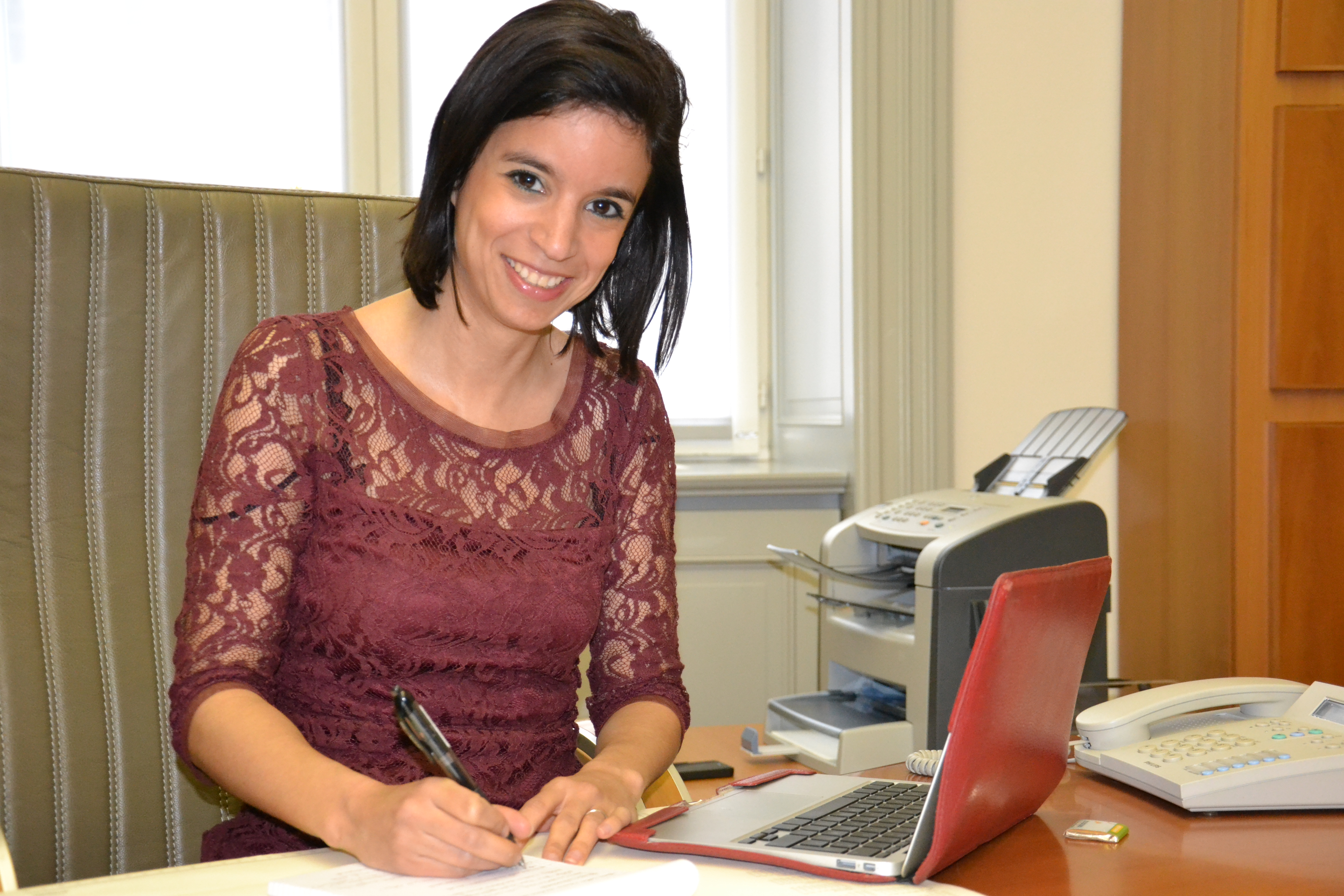
Nadia Sminate

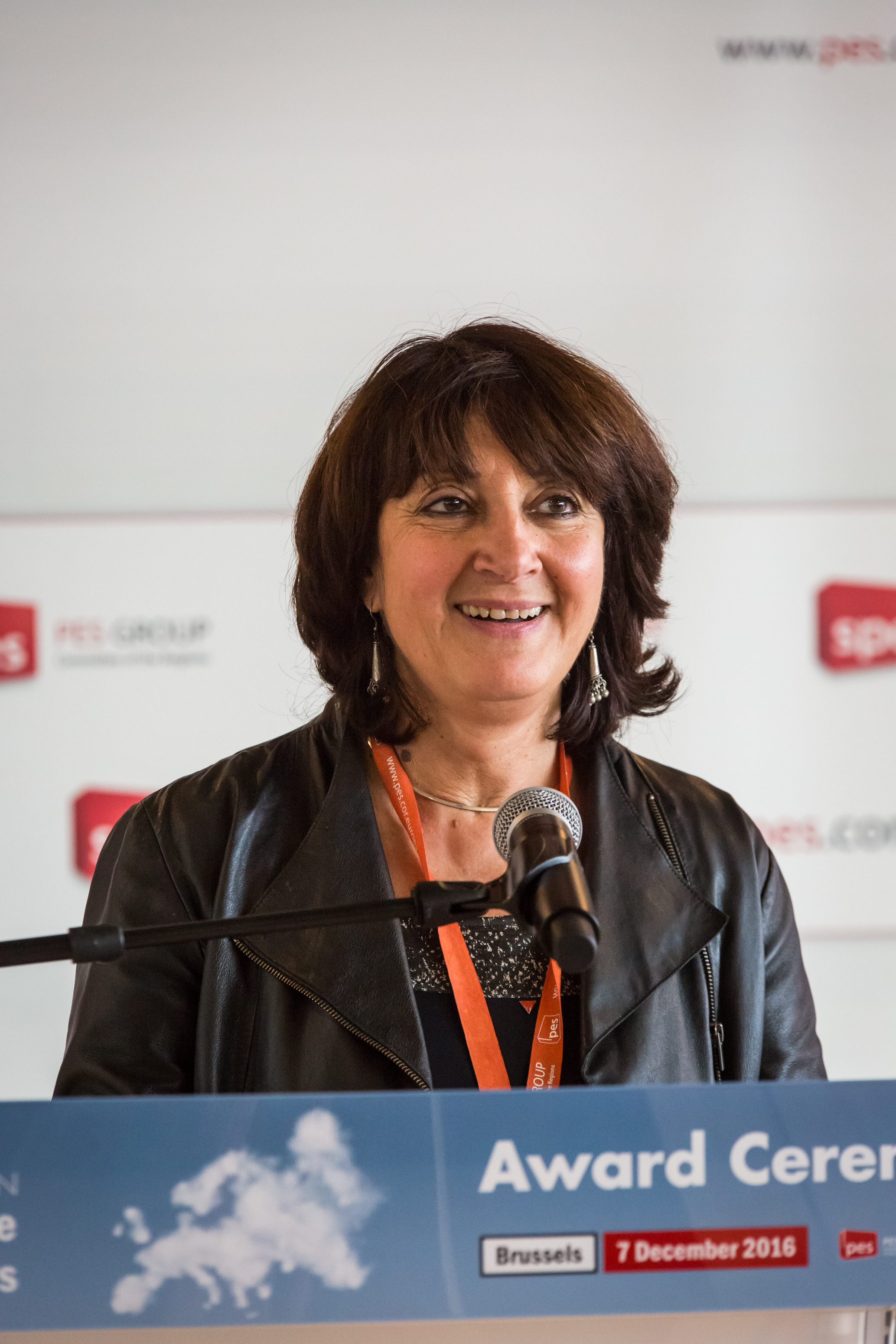
Olga Zrihen

=== Others ===
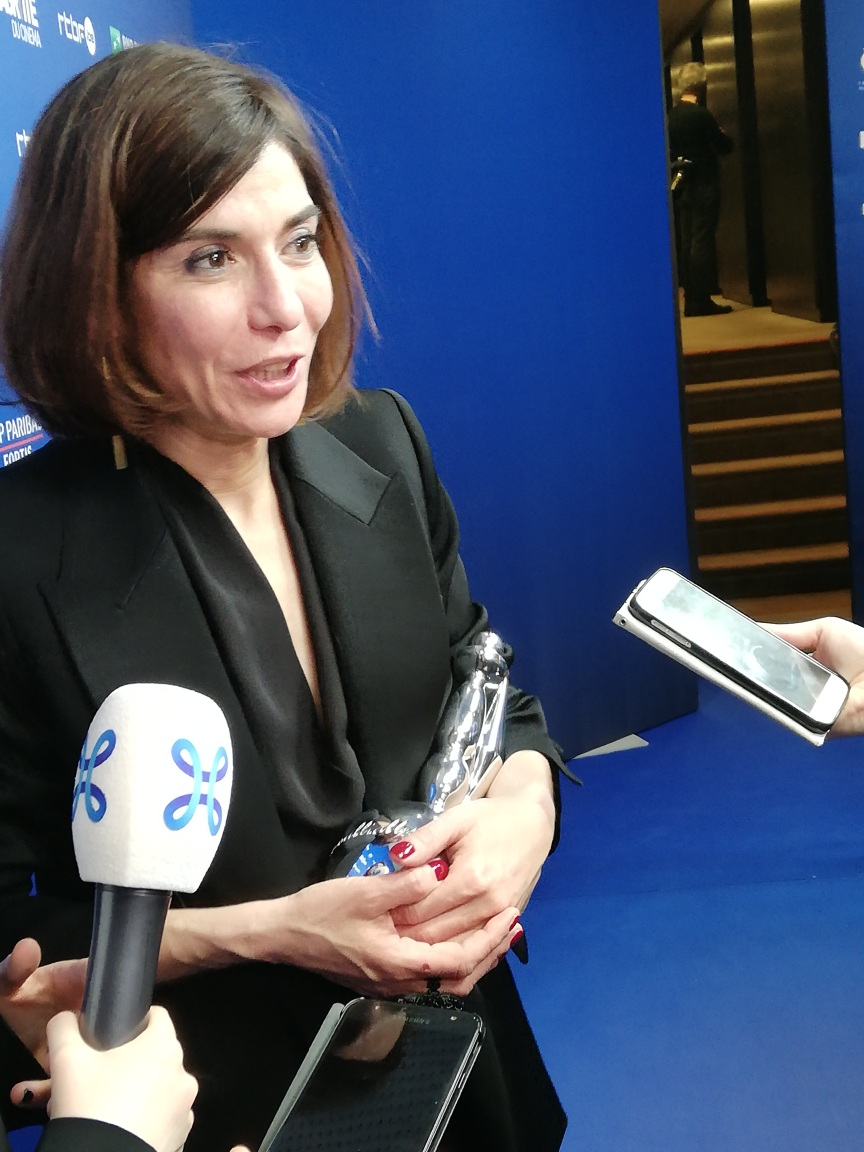
Lubna Azabal

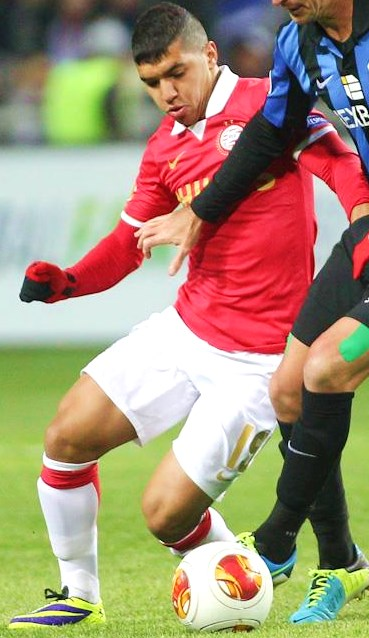
Zakaria Bakkali

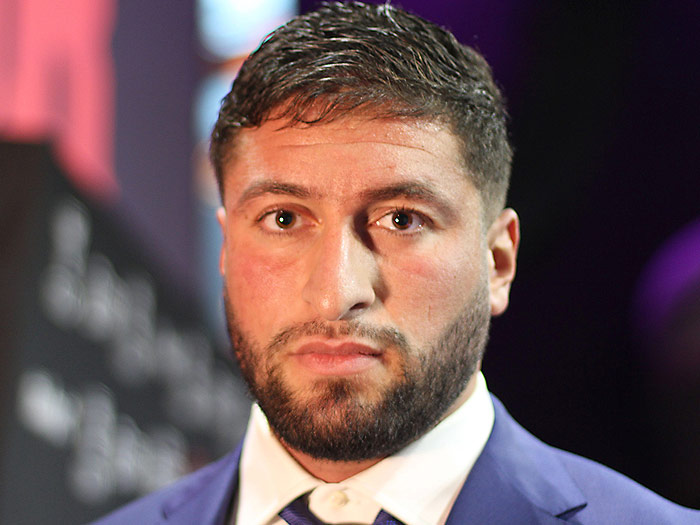
Jamal Ben Saddik

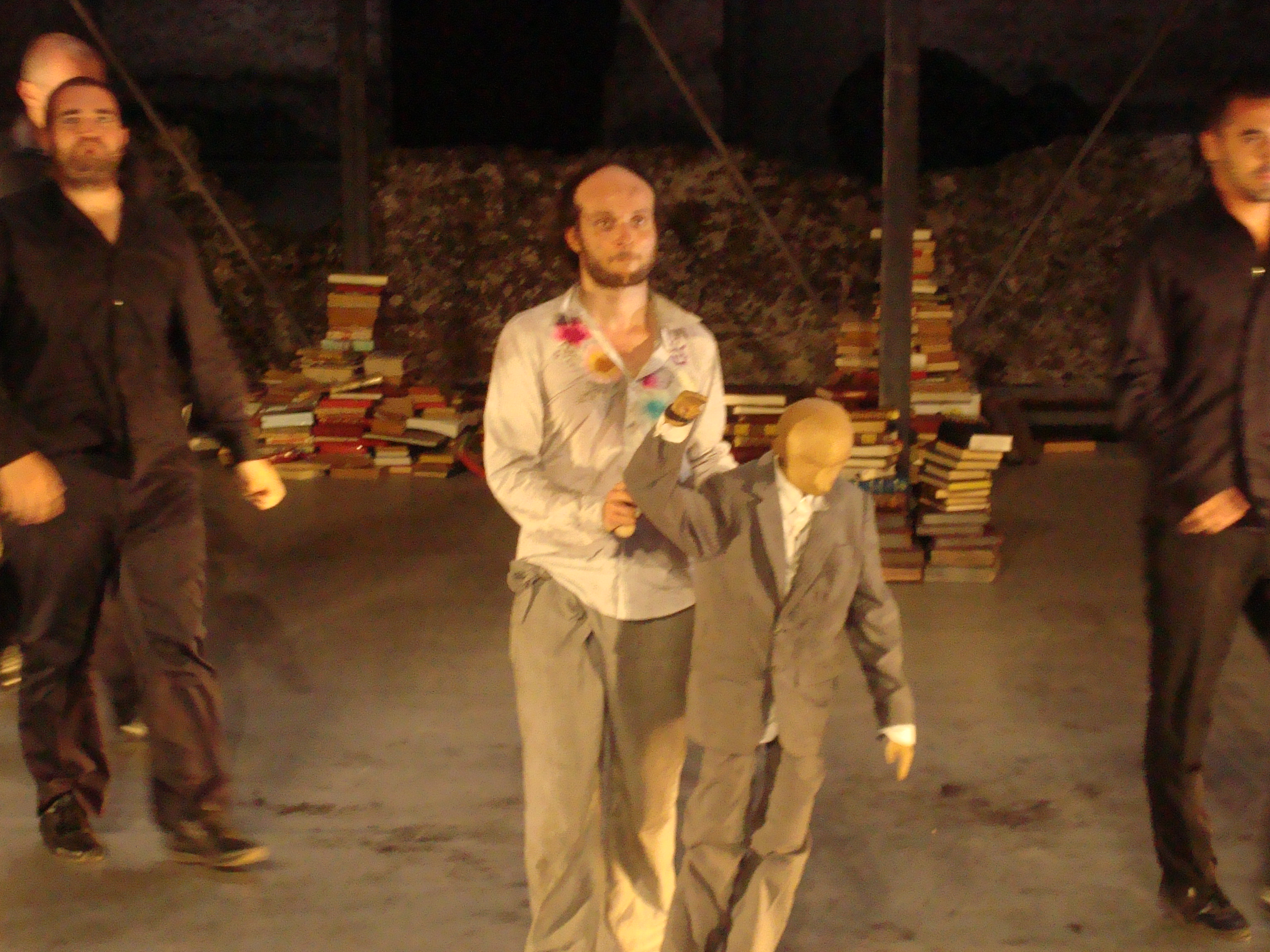
Sidi Larbi Cherkaoui

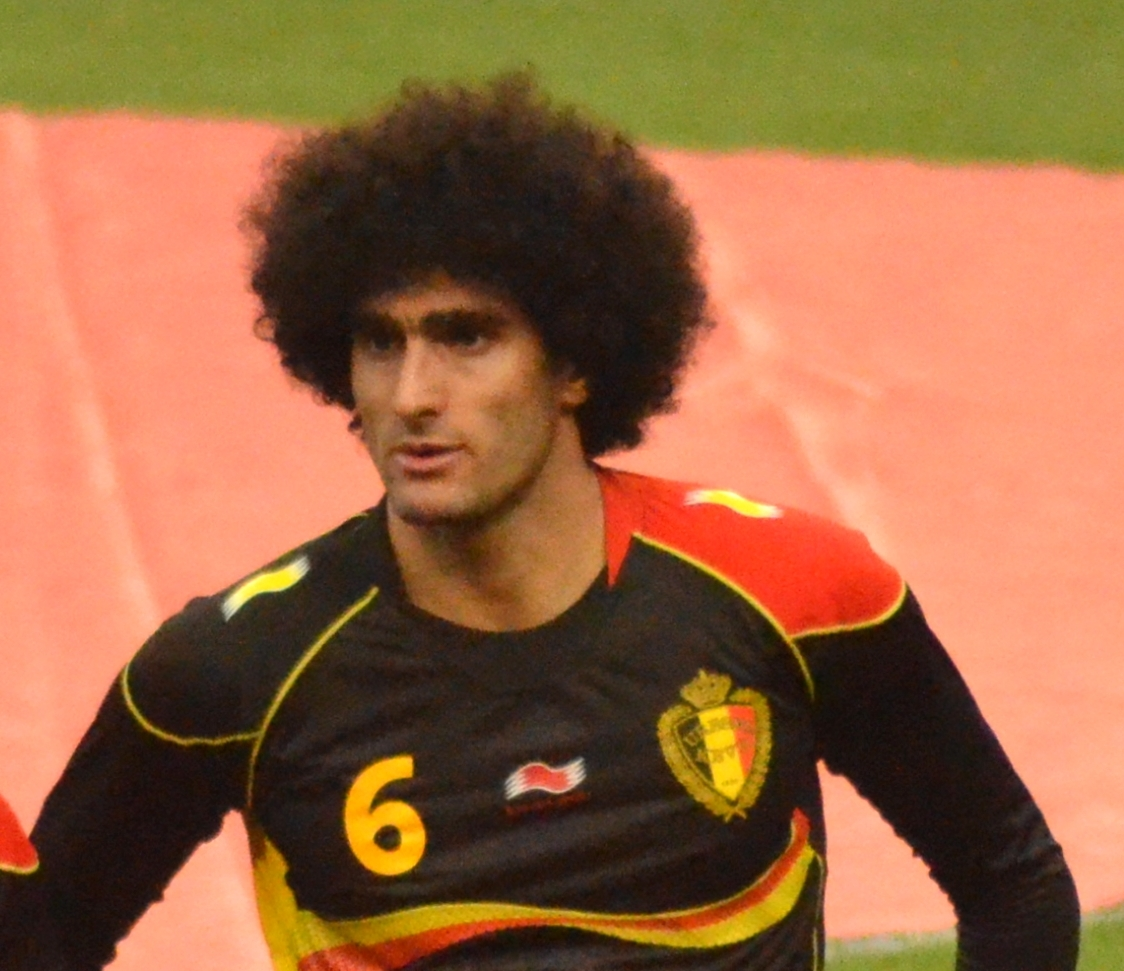
Marouane Fellaini

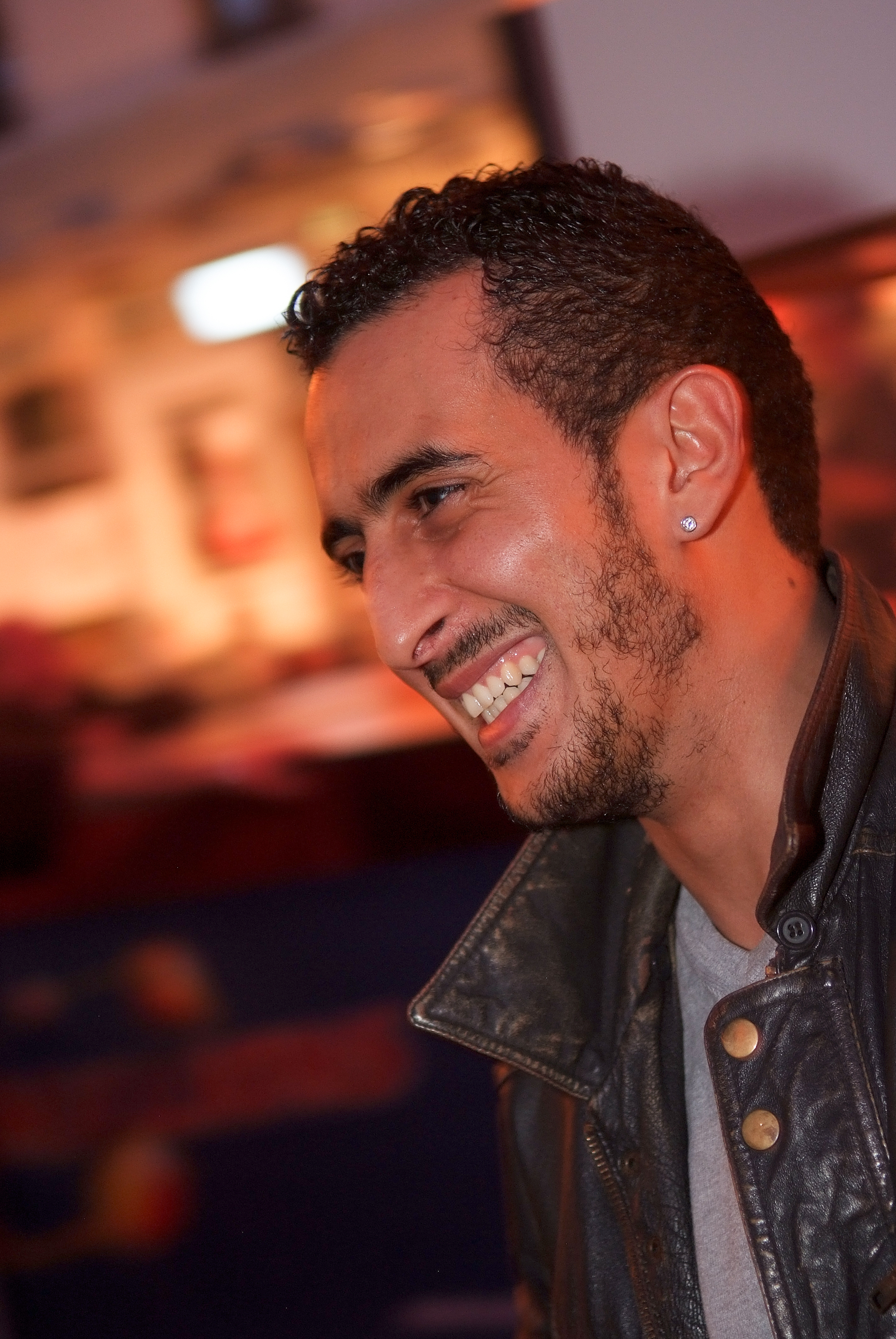
Mourade Zeguendi
- Said Ouali
- Michel Qissi
- Hamza (rapper)
- Bilal El Khannous
- Mohamed Zefzaf (professor)
- Chemsdine Talbi

== See also ==
- Immigration to Belgium
- Moroccan diaspora
- Moroccans in France
- Moroccans in Germany
- Moroccans in the Netherlands
- Islam in Belgium
- Turks in Belgium
