= British Moroccans =

Moroccan diaspora in the UK

Total population
- Moroccan-born residents 12,348 (2001 Census) 21,880 (2011 Census); Other population estimates 34,000 (2015 ONS estimate)

Regions with significant populations
- London, Manchester, Birmingham, Leeds, Liverpool, Sheffield, Glasgow, Bradford, Edinburgh, Cardiff, Newcastle Upon Tyne, Leicester, York, Huddersfield, Slough, St Albans, Crawley, Trowbridge and Blackburn

Languages
- British English, Moroccan Arabic, Berber, French and Spanish

Religion
- Majority; Sunni Islam and Minority; Christianity

Related ethnic groups
- British Arabs, Moroccan diaspora, Algerians in the United Kingdom and British Libyans

British Moroccans are citizens and/or residents of the United Kingdom whose ethnic origins lie fully or partially in Morocco.

== Migration history ==
Mass migration from Morocco to the United Kingdom began in the 1960s, primarily consisting of migrant workers recruited to work in the hotel and catering industries. The community has grown significantly due to high birth rates as well as sponsored migration of dependents.

== Population and distribution ==
The 2001 Census recorded 12,348 Moroccan-born people residing in the UK. 2009 estimates reported by the Runymede Trust suggested between 65,000 and 70,000 people of Moroccan origin reside in the UK. The Office for National Statistics estimates the Moroccan-born population to have been 34,000 in 2015. Outside of London, Trowbridge, the county town of Wiltshire, has the highest population of Moroccans in the UK. In 2009, the town became the first in the UK to be twinned with a city from a Muslim country – Oujda – due to large number of resident families with roots in the town.

According to the 2011 UK Census, a total of 21,880 people born in Morocco were residing in the UK: 21,016 were recorded in England, 230 in Wales, 530 in Scotland and 104 in Northern Ireland.

The National Association of British Arabs categorises Morocco-born immigrants as Arabs. Based on census data, it indicates that they are the sixth-largest population of British Arabs by country of birth.

== Notable British-Moroccans or Moroccans in the United Kingdom ==
- Adam Abbou: actor
- Adam Gemili: Professional sprinter
- Amelle Berrabah: singer and member of girl band Sugababes
- Chico Slimani (Youssef Slimani): Singer
- Reda Elazouar: Actor
- Fatiha El-Ghorri: Comedian
- Houda Echouafni: Actress (of Moroccan and Egyptian origins)
- Hiba Elchikhe: Actress
- Kamal El-Hajji, (BEM): (Mohammed Amal El-Hajji) Serjeant-at-Arms of the House of Commons (in 2015)
- Karim Zeroual: Television presenter
- Karima Adebibe: Model
- Kieran Djilali: Professional football player
- Laila Rouass: Actress
- Layla El: Model, dancer, and former WWE wrestler.
- Malika Zouhali-Worrall: Documentary filmmaker
- Mariah Idrissi: Muslim Hijab-wearing model, public speaker, and online personality.
- Moe Sbihi, (MBE): (Mohamed Karim Sbihi) Rower and twice Olympic medal winner
- Nabil Elouahabi: Actor
- Nora Attal: model
- Souad Talsi, (MBE): Founder of Al-Hasaniya Moroccan Women's Centre

== Associations ==
- Al-Hasaniya Moroccan Women's Centre
- Al Manaar Mosque (The Muslim Cultural Heritage Centre - MCHC)
- Moroccan Memories foundation: Memories in Britain (Oral & Visual Achieve)
- Al-Noor Youth Trust
- The Council for Arab-British Understanding(Caabu)

== See also ==
- Morocco–United Kingdom relations
- Moroccan diaspora
- Immigration to the United Kingdom
