= Berbers in the Netherlands =

Berbers in the Netherlands Berbers in Nederland
Total population
- 367,677

Regions with significant populations
- predominantly Randstad (Amsterdam, Rotterdam and The Hague)

Languages
- Dutch, Berber languages

Religion
- Sunni Islam with Christian minorities none

Related ethnic groups
- Berbers

Berbers in the Netherlands (Dutch: Berbers in Nederland) are people of Berber descent living in the Netherlands. Berbers in the Netherlands are estimated to number 367,677 people and are mainly of Riffian-Berber descent.

== Notable people ==
- Oussama Assaidi
- Abdelkader Benali
- Khalid Boulahrouz
- Ali Elkhattabi
- Ahmed Aboutaleb
- Ismaïl Aissati
- Mounir El Hamdaoui
- Rajae El Mouhandiz
- Mohammed Bouyeri
- Mohammed Benzakour
- Abdel Malek El Hasnaoui
- Zakaria Labyad

== See also ==
- Berbers
- Berbers in Belgium
- Moroccans in the Netherlands
- Moroccan diaspora
