= Germany–Morocco relations =

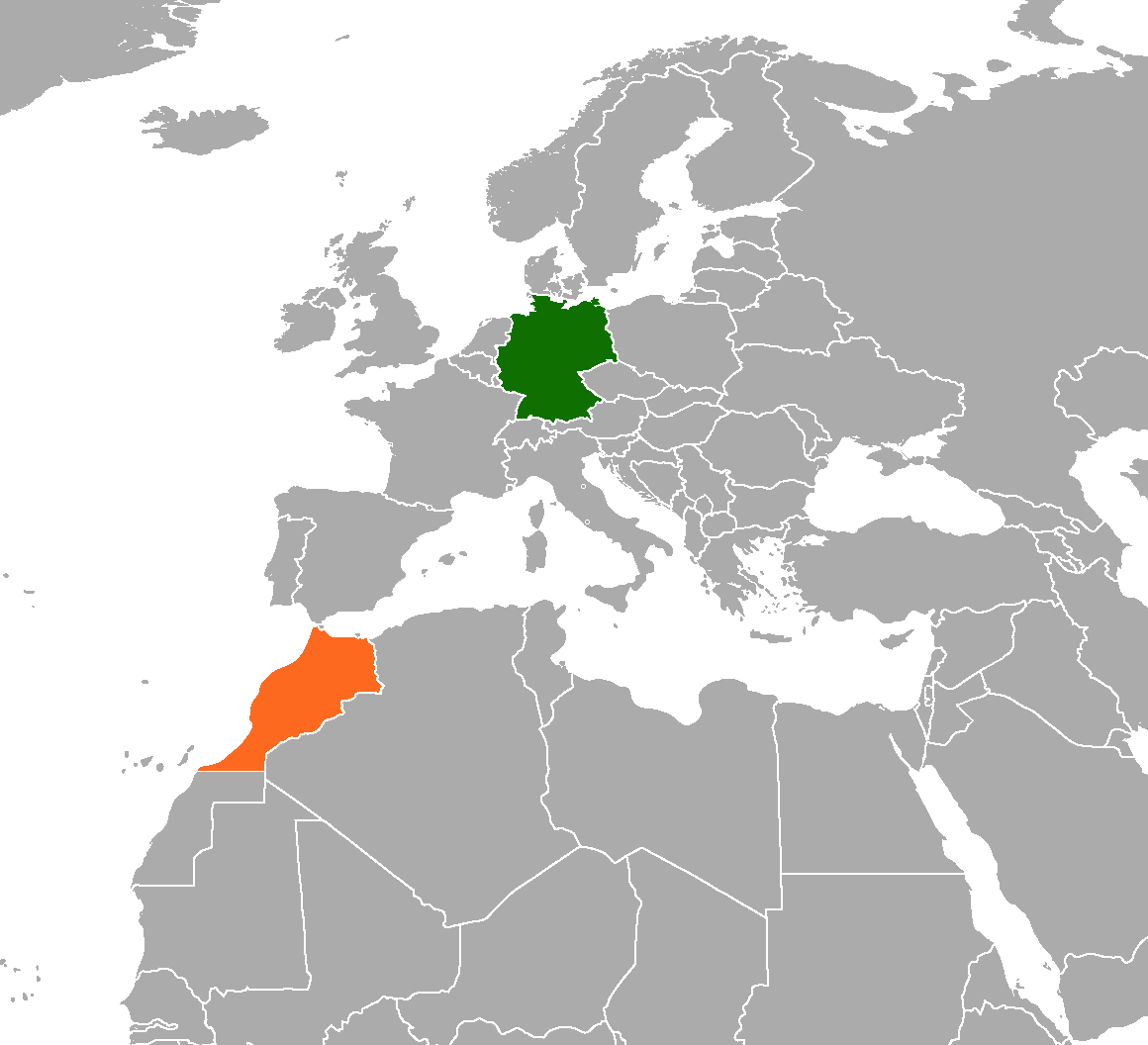

- Germany: Morocco

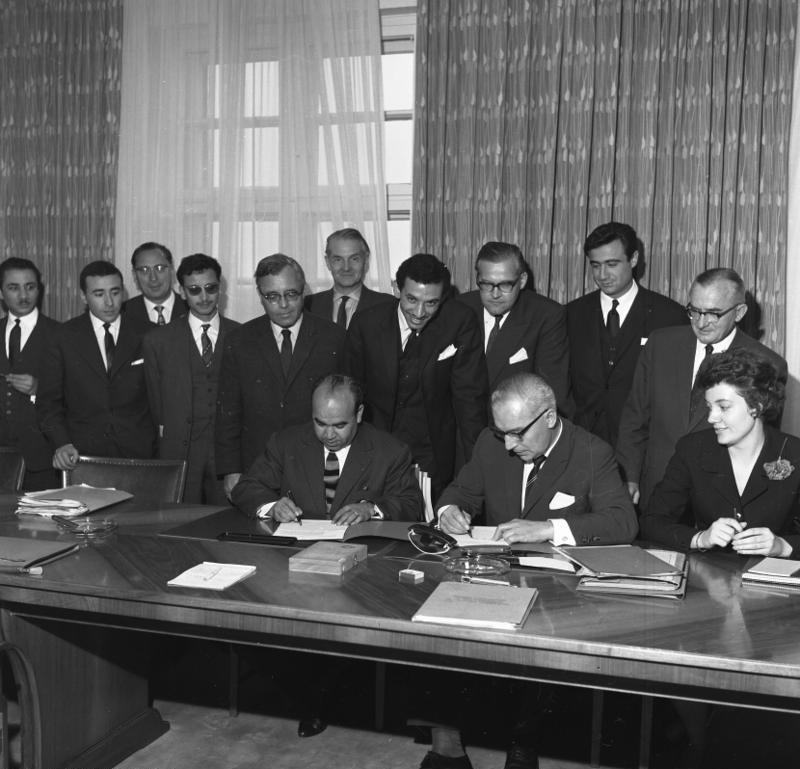
Signing a trade agreement between West Germany and Morocco, 15 April 1961

Germany–Morocco relations date back to the 19th century. The German Foreign Office describes Morocco as a "central partner of the European Union and Germany in North Africa," and Germany is an important trading partner for Morocco. In the past, however, relations have not always been entirely free of tension.

== History ==
As early as the early 16th century, the influential merchant families of the Welser and Fugger from the Holy Roman Empire Established branches in Morocco. A Roman-German contingent of troops took part in the Battle of Alcácer Quibir alongside Portugal in 1578, in which an attempted Portuguese expansion into the country was beaten back. After failed negotiations with the Hanseatic city Bremen, the Sultan of Morocco signed a trade treaty with Hanseatic rival Hamburg in 1802, and another one with Lübeck shortly thereafter.

In the 19th century, August Petermann (1854) and Gerhard Rohlfs (1873) visited the country and published reports that made the German public familiar with the country. In 1872, the German Empire under Otto von Bismarck sent a diplomatic representative to Morocco, and in 1890 a German-Moroccan trade treaty was signed in Fez. The Empire's attempt to gain influence in Morocco led to conflict with France and the First (1904–1906) and Second Moroccan Crisis (1911). German warships were dispatched by Wilhelm II in the second crisis after French troops had occupied Fez and Rabat. On November 4, 1911, the Morocco-Congo Treaty was signed, in which the Empire received Neukamerun and renounced its claims in Morocco in return. Morocco became a French protectorate shortly thereafter.

After Second World War and Morocco's independence, relations were established in 1956 with the Federal Republic of Germany (FRG) were established. In 1963, a recruitment program for Moroccan guest workers was launched. In 1966, King Hassan II visited the FRG on a state visit. From 1972 until German reunification, Morocco also maintained official diplomatic relations with the German Democratic Republic (GDR).

In March 2021, diplomatic tensions arose between the two countries after Morocco recalled its ambassador from Berlin and imposed a ban on contact with the German Embassy and German organizations. In a statement, the Moroccan Ministry of Foreign Affairs accused Germany of having "exacerbated hostile acts that are detrimental to the higher interests of the Kingdom of Morocco", listing the German government's neutral stance on Moroccan-occupied Western Sahara following the unilateral recognition of the United States of Morocco's sovereignty over the territory, as well as the country's absence from a 2020 Berlin conference on Libya, and Moroccan lobbying attempts to detain an online activist based in Duisburg.

Tensions gradually receded in the following year, partially in light of the Russian invasion of Ukraine. In August 2022, the German Foreign Minister Annalena Baerbock visited the seat of government in Rabat and a German-Moroccan joint declaration was subsequently published, announcing an intensification of bilateral relations. At the end of her visit, Baerbock and Moroccan Foreign Minister Nasser Bourita jointly supported the efforts of the United Nations to resolve the Western Sahara conflict.

== Economic relations ==
Germany and Morocco have close economic relations, and a double taxation agreement (since 1974) and an investment protection agreement (since 2007) exist between the two countries. In November 2019, a German-Moroccan reform partnership was agreed. In 2021, Germany exported 2.2 billion euros worth of goods to Morocco and in return imported 1.6 billion euros worth of goods from the country. This made Germany Morocco's sixth-largest trading partner. Nearly 300 companies with German capital are present in Morocco, and nearly 6 percent of foreign tourists in the country came from Germany in 2019. The country has phosphate reserves of strategic importance.

Germany provides development assistance to Morocco, focusing on sustainable economic development and employment, renewable energy, and water management. In 2020, Germany made pledges of 1.2 billion euros and provided emergency assistance in the context of the COVID-19 pandemic Emergency aid.

== Culture and education ==
The Deutsch-Marokkanische Gesellschaft e.V., based in Dortmund, is dedicated to promoting common cultural relations. The Friedrich Ebert Foundation, the Konrad Adenauer Foundation, the Friedrich Naumann Foundation, the Hanns Seidel Foundation and the Heinrich Böll Foundation have offices in Morocco. Two Goethe-Instituts exist in Casablanca and Rabat. The Deutsche Akademische Austauschdienst has a presence in Morocco and there are over 60 university partnerships between the two countries.

== Migration ==
About 140,000 people of Moroccan descent live in Germany, most of them in major cities such as Berlin, Düsseldorf or Frankfurt am Main. The Central Council of Moroccans in Germany, based in Frankfurt am Main, acts as a lobby for the interests of the Moroccan community. Well-known German Moroccans include rapper Farid Bang, the singers Nadja Benaissa and Namika, and football players Adil Chihi, Karim Bellarabi, Mimoun Azaouagh, Manuel Schmiedebach, and Mohamed Amsif.

== Diplomatic locations ==
- Germany has an embassy in Rabat.
- Morocco has an Embassy in Berlin and consulates-general in Düsseldorf and Frankfurt am Main.

== See also ==
- First Moroccan Crisis
- Second Moroccan Crisis
