= British Libyans =

Citizens or residents of the United Kingdom that are of Libyan ancestry

Total population
- about 160,000

Regions with significant populations
- Manchester, London, Leicester, Glasgow, Cardiff, Newcastle Upon Tyne, Edinburgh, York, Huddersfield and Preston

Languages
- Arabic (Libyan Arabic), British English

Religion
- Sunni Islam and Christianity

British Libyans are citizens or residents of the United Kingdom that are of Libyan ancestry. British-Libyans may also include children born in the United Kingdom to a British (or of any other origin) parent and a Libyan parent.

== Demographics ==
The 2011 UK Census recorded 140,284 Libyan-born residents in England, 7,620 in Wales, 10,327 in Scotland and 790 in Northern Ireland. Manchester is home to the largest Libyan population in the UK, with estimates going between 50,000 and 100,000 people of Libyan descent.

== Notable British-Libyans or Libyans residing in the United Kingdom ==
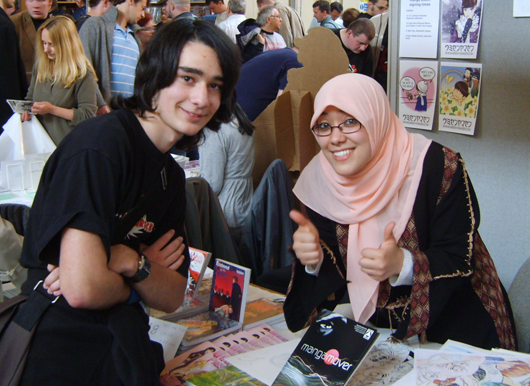
Asia Alfasi (right) and a friend at the 2007 Bristol International Comic Expo.

- Ali Omar Ermes: writer and artist whose art has been showcased across The British Museum and Tate Britain.
- Asia Alfasi: artist and manga-influenced comic writer. She is the first female to participant and win on Hi8us Midlands Stripsearch competition and is a recipient of an award from the International Manga and Anime Festival (IMAF).
- Adam Ali: actor and filmmaker
- Naziha Arebi: filmmaker, writer and artist
- Nada Bashir: journalist and correspondent
- Nour Jaouda: contemporary artist

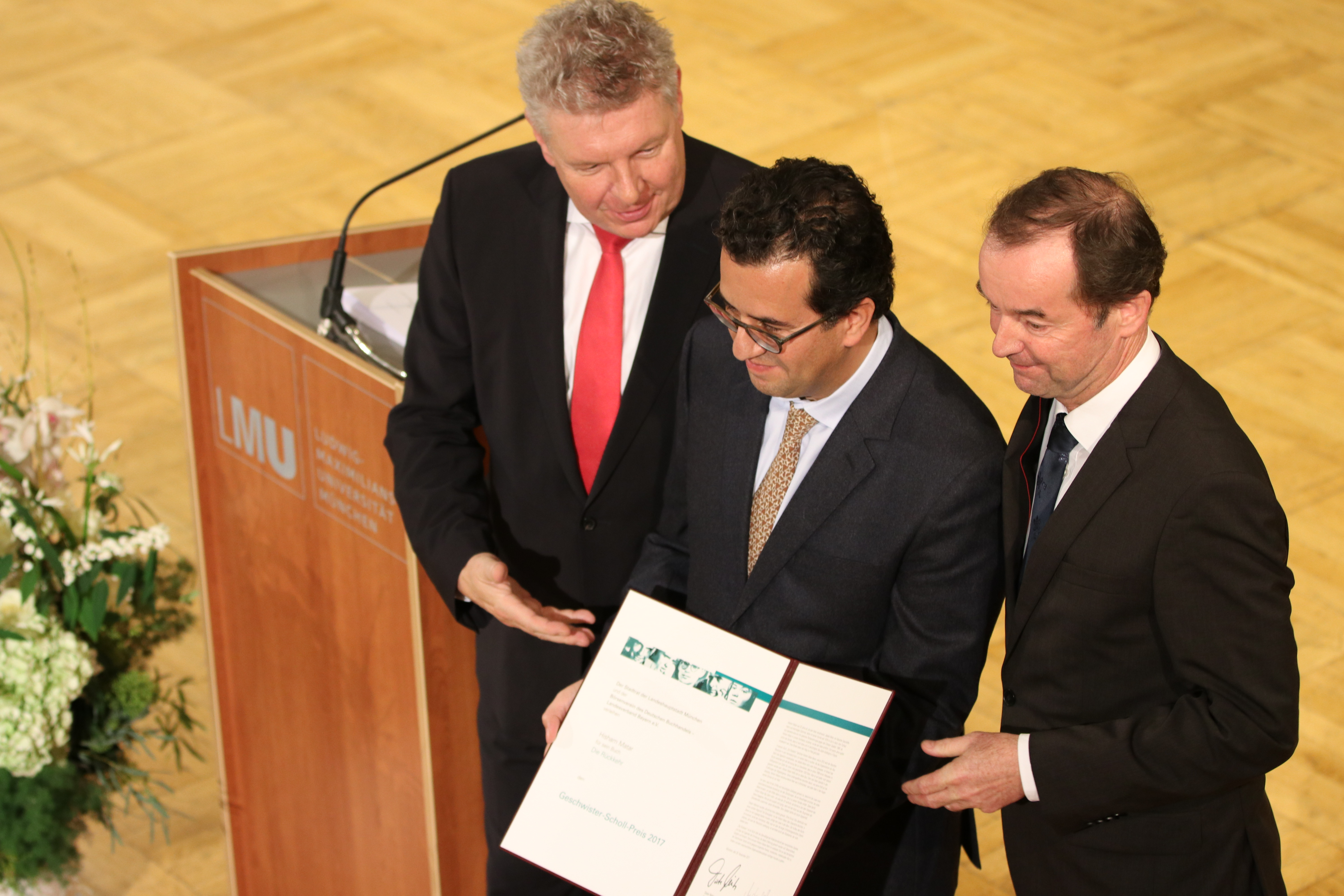
Hisham Matar receiving the Geschwister Scholl Prize 2017 for his book "The Return".

- Hisham Matar: writer and novelist. He is a recipient of the Pulitzer Prize (2017) and PEN America Jean Stein Book Award.
- Mohammed El Senussi: son of Crown Prince Hasan as-Senussi of Libya.
- Tarek Ben Halim: former investment banker and founder of Alfanar; an Arab venture philanthropy organisation for development in the Arab region.

== Associations or Community Centres ==
- Libyan Youth Association, Manchester

Community Arabic schools

- London Libyan School
- Leeds Libyan School
- Manchester Libyan School
- Leicester Libyan School
- Cardiff Libyan School
- Glasgow Libyan School
- Newcastle Libyan School

== Media ==
- Hiwar Mushtark Show: Arabic برنامح حوار مشترك : an audience-panel debate show where British-Libyans and Libyans in the UK come and discuss issues of their community in UK and issues of Libya. The program ran across a number of seasons.

== See also ==
- British Arabs
- The Council for Arab-British Understanding
