= Mariah Idrissi =

British model

- Born: Lalla Maria Derissy; 16 August 1992 (age 34); London, England
- Occupations: Model; public speaker; online personality
- Years active: 2015–present
- Known for: Being the first Muslim hijab-wearing model
- Relatives: Moulay Ahmed Derissy; Sidi Yasin Derissy
- Modeling information
- Agency: Insanity Group Management

Mariah Idrissi (born 16 August 1992) is a British model, public speaker, and online personality. Idrissi initially gained recognition as the first Muslim hijab-wearing model when she appeared in multinational retailer, H&M's "Close the Loop" campaign in 2015; after which, Idrissi became a leading authority on "modest fashion" appearing on domestic and international news programmes on the subject. In 2016, Idrissi signed to Select modelling agency in 2016 and signed with Insanity Group Management in 2017.

== Early life ==
Lalla Maria Derissy was born in London, on 16 August 1992, the daughter of a Moroccan father and a Pakistani mother. Idrissi has two brothers, Moulay Ahmed Derissy and Sidi Yasin Derissy.

== Career ==
Idrissi was first scouted by former actress turned casting director, Coralie Rose at the Westfield London shopping centre, Shepherd's Bush. Rose's talent agency, 'Road Casting Kids' secured Idrissi's first casting, an appearance in H&M's 2015 sustainable fashion campaign, 'Close The Loop'. In the ad campaign, "Idrissi is pictured outside a fish and chip shop in East London wearing a pink coat, aviator sunglasses and a checked hijab" making her the first Muslim hijab-wearing model.

Idrissi appears in both print and video ads for the Swedish fashion brand's campaign. As a result, both Idrissi and H&M made headline news receiving domestic coverage across major British media outlets, and in high fashion magazines Elle, Marie Claire and Teen Vogue. International news broadcasters including CNN, ABC AU, Huffington Post, NBC and Al Jazeera covered the now viral campaign. Katie Rogers of The New York Times wrote: "the story of Mariah Idrissi, a hijab-wearing model, has prompted a discussion about women who are reclaiming the head scarf as a form of stylish self-expression." Aaron Morrison of the International Business Times reported, "There's a considerable amount of buzz in the fashion world about Mariah Idrissi".

Publications began to refer to Idrissi as the face of modest fashion. Entity Magazine titled its piece, "Mariah Idrissi: The New Face of Modest Fashion", while journalist, Salem Ola of Abu Dhabi newspaper, The National said:

Her two-second cameo sent a wave of excitement and uncertainty through the fashion industry. Without even realising it, Idrissi had become the face of modest fashion, as the first hijab-wearing model for H&M, the second-largest global retailer, after Zara.

Writing on Dolce & Gabbana's 'Abaya' collection designed specifically for Muslim women, The Daily Telegraph's, Fashion News & Features Editor, Bibby Sowray credits Idrissi as "one of the first to make waves in the industry", while co-host of NPR's Morning Edition, Renée Montagne refers to the appearance of hijab-wearing model, Idrissi as "groundbreaking".

In May 2016, Idrissi joined the first Istanbul Modest Fashion Week held in Turkey as a "modest influencer." In November 2016, Idrissi featured in contemporary modest fashion retailer, Aab's winter season collection.

Idrissi has also appeared on a Fenty Beauty campaign, the cosmetics line by Rihanna.

== Charity and community service ==
An active humanitarian, Idrissi advocates for Syrian Women, endorsing Human Care Syria's 'Women's Hygiene and Sanitation' project. In 2016, Idrissi spoke at London's TEDxTeen conference held at the IndigoO2 at The O2 Arena. Her talk, 'Changing the Face of Fashion' is available on TEDx's official 'Tedx Innovations' site. As part of an NHS social action campaign to drive young donors to register and give blood, Idrissi joined other leading British black and Asian public figures including multiple gold-winning Olympian Nicola Adams MBE, Chuka Umunna MP, TV presenter and wheelchair basketball player Ade Adepitan MBE and MOBO's founder Kanya King MBE to launch 'Represent'.

Described by The BEAM Awards as "an influential role model and voice for many fashion conscious modest women in the UK as well as internationally," the organisation nominated Idrissi for the 2016 'Cultural Icon of the Year' award and later appointed her an ambassador of the ceremony. Idrissi uses her online social media accounts and speaking engagements communicating reactions to the H&M campaign, her work as an advocate, and how other brands are incorporating Muslim dress in mainstream fashion.
