= Berbers in Belgium =

Total population
- 500,000

Regions with significant populations
- predominantly Antwerp, Brussels

Languages
- Berber, Dutch, French, German, Spanish, Italian

Religion
- Predominantly Islam. Minorities Christianity

Berbers in Belgium are people of Berber descent living in Belgium. Berbers in Belgium are estimated to number 500,000 people.

== Notable people ==
- Lubna Azabal, actress
- Lens Annab, professional football
- Zakaria Bakkali, professional footballer
- Laurette Onkelinx, politician from the Francophone Socialist Party

== See also ==
- Berber people
- Berber Academy
- Berbers in the Netherlands
