= Moroccans in Germany =

Part of the Moroccan diaspora

- Distribution of Moroccan citizens in Germany (2021)

Total population
- 130,000

Regions with significant populations
- Rhine-Main Metropolitan Region (especially Düsseldorf Frankfurt & Offenbach, Wiesbaden, Mainz, etc.), Düsseldorf surrounding areas, Dortmund, Cologne, Bonn, Essen, Nürnberg, Bielefeld, Berlin, Duisburg, Hamburg, Stuttgart, Wuppertal,

Languages
- German and Moroccan Arabic / (mostly) Berber languages

Religion
- Predominantly Islam

Related ethnic groups
- Berbers, Algerians, Tunisians

Moroccans in Germany (Arabic: المغاربة في ألمانيا) are residents of Germany who are of Moroccan descent. According to the Federal Statistical Office of Germany, as of 2018, there are total 76,200 Moroccan residents living in Germany without German citizenship. Of those, 505 individuals were granted asylum status. Nowadays, most Moroccan-Germans have German and Moroccan citizenship.

In Germany, especially in the Rhine-Main area, many persons of Moroccan descent have roots in the province Nador.

Among the Moroccan community in Germany, there is also a small, significant minority of people of Spanish-Moroccan origin.

== Demographics ==
Number of Moroccans in larger cities
#	City	People
1.	Frankfurt	7,364
2.	Düsseldorf	4,741
3.	Dortmund	3,421
4.	Wuppertal	2,463
5.	Cologne	2,328
6.	Aachen	2,175
7.	Bonn	1,918
8.	Wiesbaden	1,801
9.	Essen	1,458
10.	Offenbach	1,386

== See also ==
- Germany–Morocco relations
- Moroccan diaspora
- Immigration to Germany
