= Ali Omar Ermes =

Libyan painter and author

- علي عمر الرميص
- Born: 1945; Tripoli, Libya
- Died: 10 July 2021
- Website: aliomarermes.co.uk

Ali Omar Ermes (Arabic: علي عمر الرميص, born 1945) was a Libyan artist and author. His paintings make use of Arabic calligraphy, often superimposed on a rich-textured ground, and may incorporate fragments of Arabic or other poetry or prose. He had lived in the United Kingdom since 1981, and was the chairman of the Muslim Cultural Heritage Centre in Kensington in west London; he was also active in other intellectual and cultural institutions in that city.

== Biography ==
Ermes was born in Zliten in Libya in 1945. He studied at the University of Plymouth School of Architecture and Design in Plymouth in south-west England, and after his graduation in 1970 returned to Libya. There he wrote extensively and headed the visual arts section of All Arts magazine. In 1974 he was engaged as a "visual arts consultant" for the World of Islam Festival held in London in 1976, and visited many Islamic countries to identify possible participants in the festival. From 1981 he lived in the United Kingdom. Ermes has participated in various Muslim community projects, written about many important issues and has exhibited in some sixty to seventy exhibitions around the world.

== Exhibitions ==
Ermes has shown work at the State Hermitage, St Petersburg, Russia (November 2007); the Fowler Museum of the University of California, Los Angeles, USA (October 2007/8); the National Museum of African Art of the Smithsonian Institution, USA (May 2007); Word into Art at the British Museum in London, and later Dubai (2006 and 2008); East-West: Objects Between Culture at Tate Britain (September 2006/7) and Dubai International Financial Centre, Dubai (March 2008).
