= Moroccans in the Netherlands =

Immigrant community and their descendants

Marokkanen in Nederland; المغاربة في هولندا

Total population
- 433,337 (2025) c. 2.4% of the Dutch population

Regions with significant populations
- Predominantly Randstad (70%), North Brabant, Limburg (16%)

Languages
- Berber (86%), Moroccan Arabic (14%), Dutch

Religion
- Predominantly Islam (98%) (Statista Survey); Minority: Nonreligious (1%), Christianity (1%) (Statista Survey)

Related ethnic groups
- Moroccans in Belgium

Moroccans in the Netherlands (Dutch: Marokkanen in Nederland; Arabic: المغاربة في هولندا, romanized: al-Maghāriba fī Hūlandā; Tamazight: Imaghrabiyen di Hollanda), also Moroccan Dutch (Marokkaanse Nederlanders) or Dutch Moroccans (Nederlandse Marokkanen), are a subgroup of the Moroccan diaspora residing in the Netherlands. They consist of immigrants from Morocco and their descendants, and form the second largest foreign ethnic group in the Netherlands after Turks.

== Migration history ==
Moroccans were not much represented in the first major postwar wave of migration to the Netherlands from the mid-1940s to the mid-1960s, which consisted mostly of people from the Netherlands' former colonies. However, they began to migrate in larger numbers during the second wave; between 1965 and 1973, one hundred thousand Turks and Moroccans came to the Netherlands, and an additional 170,000 from 1974 to 1986. Earlier arrivals consisted of "guest workers", whose recruitment and admission was governed by a bilateral treaty signed in 1969. From the 1970s, the number arriving under family reunification schemes became more significant. Around half originated from the mountainous Rif region.

According to The Netherlands Institute for Social Research annual report, marriages in 2001 between Moroccan immigrants and native Dutch were rare, accounting for only 5% of marriages. A 90% share of the marriages were to the same ethnic group and 2/3 of the spouse was a "marriage migrant" from the country of origin. Since stricter legislation was adopted in 2004, marriage immigration has decreased considerably.

== Demographic characteristics ==
As of 2025, statistics of the Dutch Centraal Bureau voor de Statistiek with regards to people of Moroccan origin showed that 433,337 people, or 2.4% of the population, were Dutch Moroccans.

As of 2009, statistics of the Dutch Centraal Bureau voor de Statistiek with regards to people of Moroccan origin showed:

- 166,774 persons of first-generation background (88,084 men, 78,690 women)
- 174,754 persons of second-generation background (88,563 men, 86,191 women), of which:
  - 23,255 persons with one parent born in the Netherlands (11,911 men, 11,344 women)
  - 151,499 persons with both parents born outside of the Netherlands (76,652 men, 74,847 women)

For a total of 353,987 persons (176,647 men, 164,881 women). This represented roughly 51% growth over the 1996 total of 225,088 persons. The population has shown an annual increase since then.

As of 2011, 16% of male youths under 25 years of age in Amsterdam are Dutch-Moroccan.

Number of Moroccans in larger cities
#	City	People
1.	Amsterdam	77,210
2.	Rotterdam	44,164
3.	The Hague	31,455
4.	Utrecht	30,656
5.	Almere	7,871
6.	Gouda	7,094
7.	Eindhoven	6,507
8.	Tilburg	6,100
9.	Breda	5,712
10.	Haarlem	5,419

=== Education ===
According to the SCB's 2005 Annual Report on Integration, most first-generation Moroccan migrants had a very low level of education, with many of them having had little or no schooling at all. Men with a secondary education were deliberately not recruited as guest workers. In addition, many Moroccan "marriage migrants" who arrived in the Netherlands by marrying an immigrant already living in the country, as well as the "in-between-generation" of migrants who arrived while aged 6–18, have a low education. This has resulted in an on average poorer command of the Dutch language among these groups.

While almost half of Dutch and Iranian-origin pupils attend higher secondary education (Hoger algemeen voortgezet onderwijs or havo) or pre-university education (Voorbereidend wetenschappelijk onderwijs or vwo), only a fifth of Moroccan pupils did so in 2005. Since then, schooling levels have gradually improved.

=== Religiosity ===
According to a 2018 survey using 2015 data, a very high proportion of Moroccans regard themselves as Muslim which together with Turks represented two thirds of all Muslims in the country. The fraction self-identifying as Muslims is higher among those with Moroccan ancestry (94%) than those with Turkish ancestry (86%). The fraction remained constant in the Moroccan group from 2006 to 2015, while it declined in the Turkish group from 93% to 86% during the period.

Religious behaviour and religious attitudes among Moroccan Muslims 15 years and older, by origin, 2015	%
Regards self as Muslim	94
Non-religious	5
Visits mosque at least weekly	37
Prays five times a day	78
Fasted every day during Ramadan	87
Eats halal everyday	93
Wears the headscarf (women)	78
My faith is an important part of who I am	96
I wouldn't like it if my daughter married someone from another faith	63
Muslims should be able to live in accordance with the rules of Islam	66

=== Crime rate ===
In 2015, individuals with a Moroccan background were roughly five times as likely to have been suspected of a crime compared to the native Dutch: 4.64% to 0.83% (the ratio has not been standardised for age). Of the first generation 2.5% was a crime suspect and, of the second generation, 7.4%; of all males almost 7.8% and women 1.34%. For Moroccans aged 18–25, one in ten have been suspected of a crime. For non-Western immigrants in general, the second generation has a higher crime rate than the first generation. However, crime rate for Dutch as well as immigrants from a number of non-Western countries, including Moroccans, almost halved in the 2005-2015 period. Even after correcting for socioeconomic circumstances, the crime rate among Moroccans is disproportionately higher, about two times, compared to native Dutch people and those of Turkish descent.

== Culture ==
"I know my friends from the street," a 2002 Verweij-Jonker Institute report on leisure time of Dutch Turks and Dutch Moroccans, stated that Dutch Moroccans tend to make few new contacts from the street, tend to spend leisure time with members of the same ethnicity and sex, and have leisure activities heavily influenced by "Moroccan culture". Frank Buijs did a 1993 study of young Moroccan men in the Netherlands. He found that young men prefer attending "Moroccan parties" over other types of parties since they are able to meet other Moroccans and consider the parties to be "fun".

Trees Pels' 1982 literature study of Dutch-Turks and Dutch-Moroccans concluded that, of both groups, due to socio-cultural factors, girls "infrequently" participated in leisure activities.

In the 1990s, several organizations were established to encourage and promote Dutch Moroccan cultural productions. In 1996 Hassan Bousetta concluded that the Dutch Moroccan community received little support from the Dutch government in some of its artistic and cultural expressions. Bousetta concluded that, in the words of Miriam Gazzah, author of "Rhythms and Rhymes of Life: Music and Identification Processes of Dutch-Moroccan Youth," "the state's policy aimed at political emancipation of Moroccans obstructed rather than promoted the production of new or innovative cultural and artistic developments."

== LGBT-related attitudes ==
Laurens Buijs, Gert Hekma, and Jan Willem Duyvendak, authors of the 2011 article "'As long as they keep away from me': The paradox of antigay violence in a gay-friendly country," explained that members of three ethnic groups, Dutch-Moroccans, Dutch-Antilleans, and Dutch-Turks, "are less accepting towards homosexuality, also when controlled for gender, age, level of education and religiosity."

Police records reveal that perpetrators of anti-gay violence in Amsterdam are as often native Dutch as they are Dutch-Moroccan, but Buijs et al. said Dutch-Moroccans "are over-represented as suspects" because 16% of male youth under 25 are Dutch-Moroccan compared to 39% of male youth under 25 being native Dutch. The Party for Freedom (PVV) had stated that "The perpetrators of antigay violence in the big cities are almost always Muslims, almost always Moroccans." Buijs et al. say that overrepresentation of Dutch-Moroccans in statistics of antigay violence recorded by Dutch police is not primarily caused by their religion but "more likely the result of their low social-economic position, combined with the fact that their family networks are less tight, and their upbringing less strict, than for example those of Dutch-Turks." Buijs et al. say that the lack of tight family networks and the more lax upbringing "draws the Dutch-Moroccans, more often than youngsters from other groups, away from their homes and schools to public spaces, where they learn to live according to the tough and hyper-masculine codes of the culture of the street."

== Notable people ==
- Ahmed Aboutaleb, first Moroccan-Dutch mayor of Rotterdam
- Ibrahim Afellay, football (soccer) player
- Karim El Ahmadi, football (soccer) player
- Najib Amhali, comedian
- Nordin Amrabat, football (soccer) player
- Khadija Arib, Speaker of the Dutch House of Representatives
- Ali B, hip-hop artist
- Abdelkader Benali, novelist, columnist
- Khalid Boulahrouz, football (soccer) player
- Dries Boussatta, football (soccer) player
- Cilvaringz, record producer, rapper, and artist manager
- Salah Edin, hip hop artist
- Mounir El Hamdaoui, football (soccer) player
- Imaan Hammam, fashion model
- John van den Heuvel, crime journalist
- Badr Hari, kickboxer
- Pierre van Hooijdonk, football (soccer) player
- Zakaria Labyad, football (soccer) player
- Adam Maher, football (soccer) player
- Ahmed Marcouch, mayor of Arnhem
- Noussair Mazraoui, football (soccer) player
- Rajae El Mouhandiz, singer, recording artist, producer & poet
- Abdelhak Nouri, former soccer player
- R3hab, DJ
- Hakim Ziyech, football (soccer) player
- Abdenasser El Khayati, football (soccer) player

== See also ==
- Arabs in the Netherlands
- Berbers in the Netherlands
- Immigration to the Netherlands
- Moroccan diaspora
- Morocco–Netherlands relations
