= Moroccan diaspora =

People of Moroccan birth or ancestry living outside Morocco

الجالية المغربية ⵉⵎⵖⵔⵉⴱⵉⵢⵏ ⵏ ⵓⵎⴰⴹⴰⵍ
- Map of the Moroccan diaspora in the world

Total population
- c. 3 million

Regions with significant populations
- France: 1,146,000
- Spain: 766,000
- Israel: 493,200-1,000,000
- Belgium: 298,000
- Italy: 412,000
- Netherlands: 363,000
- Germany: 127,000

Languages
- Arabic (Moroccan Arabic, Judeo-Moroccan Arabic, Hassaniya Arabic, Jebli Arabic); Berber (Tashlhit, Tarifit, Central Atlas Tamazight)

Religion
- Predominantly Islam; Minority Judaism and Christianity

Related ethnic groups
- Other Berbers, Arabs and Maghrebis

The Moroccan diaspora (Arabic: الجالية المغربية), part of the wider Arab diaspora, consists of emigrants from Morocco and their descendants. An estimated 3 million Moroccans live abroad, with the majority of the diaspora being located in Western Europe, especially France and Spain.

== Western Europe ==
Moroccans are one of the largest migrant populations in Western Europe, with the Moroccan diaspora community living in France estimated at 1,146,000, Spain 766,000, Italy 487,000, the Netherlands 363,000, Belgium 298,000, and Germany 127,000.

== Religion ==
The Moroccan diaspora is mainly composed of Sunni Muslims, along with a substantial number of Moroccan Jews especially in Israel.

There is also a minority of Shia Muslims as well a Christian minority, especially in France, Spain, Belgium and the Netherlands.

== See also ==
- Moroccans
- Moroccans in France
- Maghrebi communities of Paris
- Moroccans in Spain
- Moroccan Jews in Israel
- Moroccans in Italy
- Moroccans in Belgium
- Moroccans in the Netherlands
- Moroccans in Germany
- Moroccan Canadians
- Moroccan Americans
- Moroccans in Sweden
- British Moroccans
