= Demographics of the Netherlands =

- Population pyramid of the Netherlands in 2023
- Population: 18,000,000 (15 August 2024) (67th)
- Density: 424 per km^{2} (33rd)
- Growth rate: 0.29% (155th)
- Birth rate: 10.2 births/1,000 (2021)
- Death rate: 9.6 deaths/1,000 (2022)
- Life expectancy: 81.6 years (16th)
  - male: 80.1 years
  - female: 83.1 years
- Fertility rate: 1.43 children/woman (2023)
- Immigrant share: 16.2% (2024)

Age structure
- 0–14 years: ▼14.9% (2025 est.)
- 15–64 years: ▼64.2% (2025 est.)
- 65 and over: ▲20.9% (2025 est.)

Sex ratio
- Total: 0.98 male/female
- At birth: 1.05 male/female
- Under 15: 1.05 male/female
- 15–64 years: 1.02 male/female
- 65 and over: 0.83 male/female

Nationality
- Nationality: Dutch citizen
- Major ethnic: Dutch and Frisians (70.93%)
- Minor ethnic: Other Europeans (9.59%); Turks and Kurds (2.65%); Moroccans (2.41%); Surinamese (2.04%); Indo-Surinamese (N/D); Afro-Surinamese (N/D); Others (N/D); Indos (1.92%); Germans (1.86%); Poles (1.35%); Syrians (1.21%); Curaçao (0.9%); Ukrainians (0.83%); Belgians (0.76%); Han Chinese (0.58%); Brits (0.57%); Indians (0.55%); Iraqis (0.43%); Italians (0.42%); Romanians (0.37%); Spaniards (0.37%); Iranians (0.37%); Afghans (0.36%); Americans (0.36%); Bulgarians (0.35%); French (0.33%); Russians (0.29%); Brazilians (0.28%); Other groups (7.59%)

Language
- Official: Dutch and Frisian
- Spoken: Languages of the Netherlands

Demographic features of the population of the Netherlands include population density, ethnicity, education level, health of the population, economic status, religious affiliations and other aspects of the population.

Population growth between 1000–2021

== Population ==
The Netherlands is the 69th most populous country in the world. As of January 2023, the Netherlands has a population of 17,821,419.

Between 1900 and 1950 the population almost doubled from 5.14 to 10.11 million people. From 1950 to 2000 the population increased from 10.11 to 15.92 million people, increasing by a smaller proportion but, still, at an impressive pace for a European country, recording a growth of 57.45% over a 50-year time span.

Of countries with at least 7.5 million people, The Netherlands is the 4th most densely populated, and is the 26th most densely populated in the world overall. It is the 5th most densely populated country in Europe; the first four are microstates. The 17,821,419 million Dutch inhabitants are concentrated on an area (land surface) of 33,895 km^{2} (13,087 sq mi). This means that the country has a population density of 526/km^{2} (1,360/sq mi). The density of 500 inhabitants/km^{2} was reached in the first half of 2014.

As a result of these demographic characteristics, the Netherlands has had to plan its land use strictly. Since 1946 the Ministry of Housing, Spatial Planning and the Environment has been occupied with the national coordination of land use. Because of its high population density the Netherlands has also reclaimed land from the sea by poldering. Between 1927 and 1968 an entire province – Flevoland – was created. As of May 2023 it houses 447,193 people. Because of these policies, the Dutch have been able to combine high levels of population density with extremely high levels of agricultural production.

Even though the Netherlands is so densely populated, it has no municipalities with a population over one million. Nevertheless, the two largest municipalities of the country do score well over a million if the complete city region is counted, thus including the neighbouring satellite towns that often are physically connected to the main municipality. Moreover, the "four big cities" (Amsterdam, Rotterdam, The Hague and Utrecht) can in many ways be regarded as a single metropolitan area, the Randstad ("rim city" or "edge city") with over 7.5 million inhabitants around an agricultural "green heart" (Groene Hart).

View source data.
View source data.
View source data.
View source data.
View source data.

=== Growth rate ===
0.37% (2021 est.) Country comparison to the world: 168th

=== Fertility ===
Historical population
Year	Pop.	±% p.a.
1000	369,000	—
1300	881,000	+0.29%
1500	1,090,000	+0.11%
1600	1,540,000	+0.35%
1700	2,000,000	+0.26%
1800	2,000,000	+0.00%
1900	5,104,000	+0.94%
1910	5,858,000	+1.39%
1920	6,754,000	+1.43%
1930	7,825,000	+1.48%
1940	8,834,000	+1.22%
1950	10,026,773	+1.27%
1960	11,417,254	+1.31%
1970	12,957,621	+1.27%
1980	14,091,014	+0.84%
1990	14,892,574	+0.55%
2000	15,863,950	+0.63%
2010	16,574,989	+0.44%
2020	17,424,978	+0.50%
Source: Our World in Data and Statistics Netherlands

The Dutch population is ageing. Furthermore, life expectancy has increased because of developments in medicine, and in addition to this, the Netherlands has seen increasing immigration. Despite these developments combined with the population boom after the Second World War, the low birth rate has caused extremely low population growth: 2005 saw the lowest absolute population growth since 1900.

This demographic development has consequences for health care and social security policy. As the Dutch population ages, the proportion of people of working age, as a percentage of the entire population, decreases. Important policy advisors like the CBS (Statistical Office) and the CPB (Planning Office) have pointed out that this will cause problems with the current system of old age pensions: fewer people will work to pay for old age pensions, while there will be more people receiving those pensions. Furthermore, the costs of health care are also projected to increase. These developments have caused several cabinets, notably the second Balkenende cabinet to reform the system of health care and social security to increase participation in the labour market and make people more conscious of the money they spend on health care.

In 2003, the annual birth rate per thousand was highest in the province of Flevoland (15.9). The overall lifelong Total fertility rate (TFR), was highest in the province of Flevoland (2.0) and lowest in the province of Limburg (1.6). The municipality with the highest TFR was Urk (3.23) followed by Valkenburg (2.83), Graafstroom (2.79) and Staphorst (2.76). The lowest TFRs were recorded in Vaals (1.11) and Thorn (1.21).

The total population at 31 December 2006 was 16,356,914. The population loss due to net emigration was 35,502 (an estimated 40–50% of emigrants were ethnic non-Dutch).

In 2007, there were 117,000 immigrants (including 7000 Germans, 6000 Poles, 5000 Bulgarians, 3000 Turks and 2000 Moroccans) and 123,000 emigrants. Nearly half the emigrants were native Dutch, followed at a distance by nearly 5000 Poles and more than 3000 Germans. There was an observable increase in net immigration from the former USSR, Bulgaria and Romania.

The annual death rate was lowest in the municipalities of Valkenburg (2.9 per 1000), Zeewolde (3.2), Renswoude (3.4), Westervoort and Zeevang (both 3.9). The highest annual death rates were recorded in Warmond (22.3 per 1000), Laren (19.9) and Doorn (18.8).

16.4% of the total births in 2003 were to parents of non-European origin, although they account for only 12.4% of the population in the 25–34 age group. For example, 3.8% of the births were ethnic Moroccan, although they were only 2.26% of the 25–34 age group. Respective figures were 3.27% and 3.0% for Turks. The TFR for Moroccans in 2003 was 3.3 while the general TFR was 1.73. TFR was 2.3 for Turks, 1.7 for Surinamese, 1.8 for Arubans, 3.0 for Africans and 1.8 for Americans. (These figures compare with a figure of around 2.1 required to maintain a stable overall population figure.)

According to Statistics Netherlands, for the year 2007, the TFR for those born in Netherlands was 1.72 (1.65 in 2000). TFR of Moroccan immigrants was 2.87 (3.22 in 2000) and that of Turkish immigrants was 1.88 (2.18 in 2000).

The total fertility rate is the annual average number of children born per woman over her lifespan. It is based on fairly good data for the entire period. Sources: Our World In Data and Gapminder Foundation.

Years	1840	1841	1842	1843	1844	1845	1846	1847	1848	1849	1850
Total Fertility Rate in the Netherlands	5.11	5.09	5.06	5.04	5.02	4.99	4.99	4.99	4.99	4.99	4.89

Years	1851	1852	1853	1854	1855	1856	1857	1858	1859	1860
Total Fertility Rate in the Netherlands	4.8	4.7	4.6	4.6	4.6	4.6	4.6	4.6	4.68	4.75

Years	1861	1862	1863	1864	1865	1866	1867	1868	1869	1870
Total Fertility Rate in the Netherlands	4.83	4.9	4.98	4.99	5.01	5.02	5.04	5.05	5.09	5.12

Years	1871	1872	1873	1874	1875	1876	1877	1878	1879	1880
Total Fertility Rate in the Netherlands	5.16	5.19	5.23	5.27	5.31	5.34	5.38	5.42	5.39	5.35

Years	1881	1882	1883	1884	1885	1886	1887	1888	1889	1890
Total Fertility Rate in the Netherlands	5.32	5.28	5.25	5.23	5.21	5.18	5.16	5.14	5.11	5.07

Years	1891	1892	1893	1894	1895	1896	1897	1898	1899
Total Fertility Rate in the Netherlands	5.04	5	4.97	4.93	4.88	4.84	4.79	4.75	4.6

1.78 children born/woman (2021 est.) Country comparison to the world: 157th

11.0 births/1,000 population (2021 est.) Country comparison to the world: 178th

==== Mother's mean age at first birth ====
29.8 years (2017 est.)

=== Life expectancy ===
Life expectancy in the Netherlands since 1850

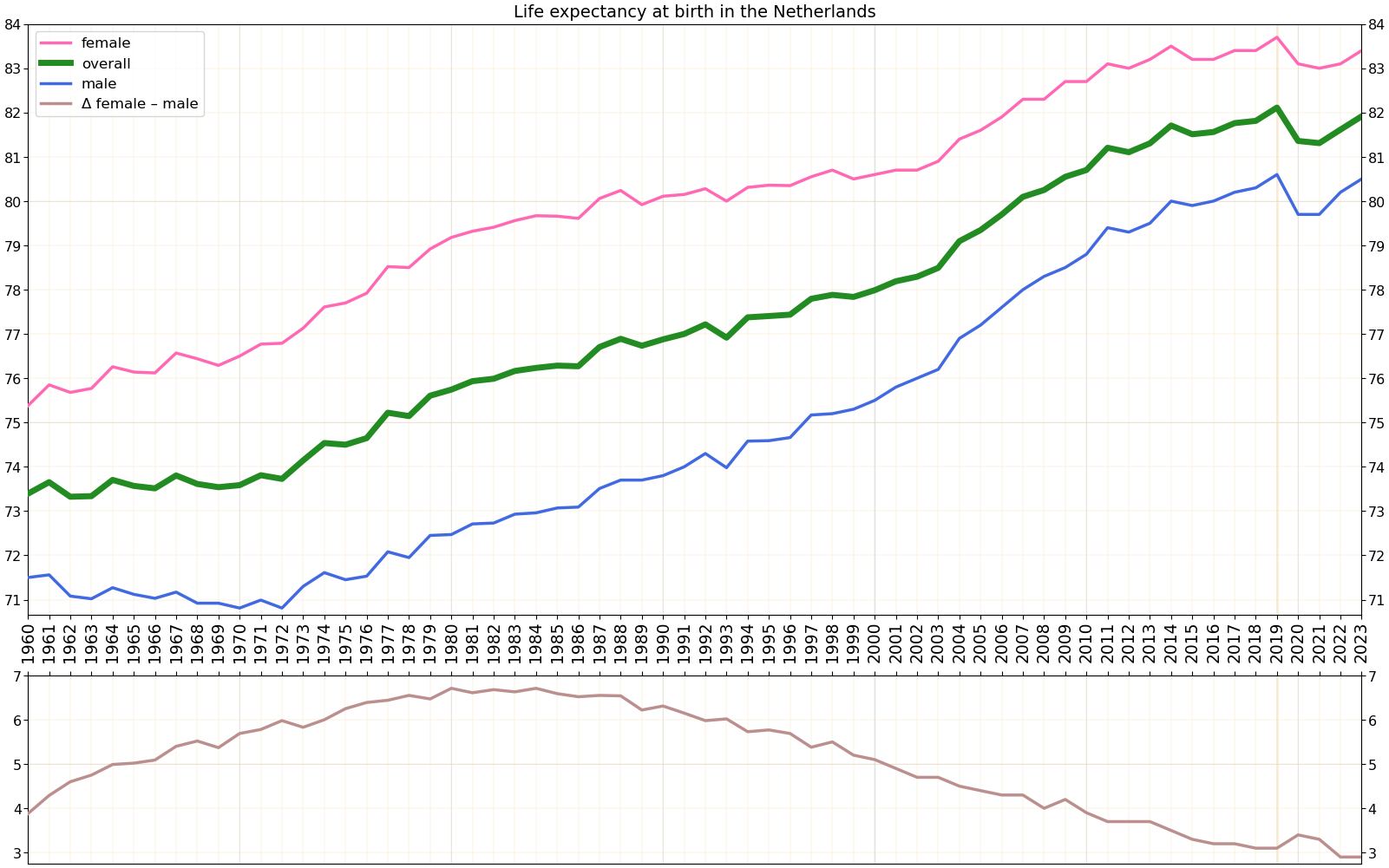
Life expectancy in the Netherlands since 1960 by gender

Sources: Our World In Data

Life expectancy in the Netherlands 1850–1950
1850	1851	1852	1853	1854	1855	1856	1857	1858	1859	1860
39.8	40.0	38.6	38.6	38.6	34.5	38.8	35.5	34.7	30.9	36.9
	1861	1862	1863	1864	1865	1866	1867	1868	1869	1870
	36.4	38.3	38.3	37.5	36.4	33.6	39.2	37.7	40.4	37.3
	1871	1872	1873	1874	1875	1876	1877	1878	1879	1880
	32.9	36.5	39.2	41.3	38.2	40.4	42.0	41.1	41.9	40.3
	1881	1882	1883	1884	1885	1886	1887	1888	1889	1890
	42.8	43.7	42.3	41.3	43.2	41.9	44.9	44.2	44.3	44.4
	1891	1892	1893	1894	1895	1896	1897	1898	1899	1900
	44.2	43.9	45.8	46.9	46.6	48.6	49.4	49.1	49.3	48.4
	1901	1902	1903	1904	1905	1906	1907	1908	1909	1910
	48.7	50.6	51.5	50.9	52.1	52.7	53.5	52.7	54.9	55.1
	1911	1912	1913	1914	1915	1916	1917	1918	1919	1920
	53.1	57.2	57.3	57.2	57.2	56.2	55.6	47.6	55.0	57.8
	1921	1922	1923	1924	1925	1926	1927	1928	1929	1930
	59.7	59.8	62.0	62.9	63.1	63.0	62.6	63.7	62.2	64.7
	1931	1932	1933	1934	1935	1936	1937	1938	1939	1940
	64.3	65.4	66.0	66.6	66.5	66.7	67.0	67.4	67.7	65.4
	1941	1942	1943	1944	1945	1946	1947	1948	1949	1950
	65.3	65.8	64.4	61.3	55.4	67.6	69.5	71.1	70.3	71.4

Total population: 81.9 years (2020 est.) Country comparison to the world: 30th
Males: 79.7 years (2020 est.)
Females: 84.3 years (2020 est.)

=== Age structure ===
Animated population pyramid of the Netherlands: 1950-2020

0–14 years: 16.11% (male 1,425,547 /female 1,358,894)
15–24 years: 11.91% (male 1,049.000 /female 1,008,763)
25–54 years: 38.47% (male 3,334,064 /female 3,313,238)
55–64 years: 13.69% (male 1,177,657/female 1,188,613)
65 years and over: 19.82% (male 1,558,241/female 1,866,380) (2020 est.)

==== Median age ====
total: 42.8 years. Country comparison to the world: 32nd
male: 41.6 years
female: 44.0 years (2020 est.)

=== Cities and population density ===
Largest municipalities in the Netherlands Statistics Netherlands
Rank	Name	Province	Pop.	Rank	Name	Province	Pop.
1	Amsterdam	North Holland	931,298	11	Apeldoorn	Gelderland	168,211
2	Rotterdam	South Holland	670,610	12	Haarlem	North Holland	167,636
3	The Hague	South Holland	566,221	13	Arnhem	Gelderland	167,632
4	Utrecht	Utrecht	374,238	14	Haarlemmermeer	North Holland	163,128
5	Eindhoven	North Brabant	246,417	15	Amersfoort	Utrecht	161,852
6	Groningen	Groningen	243,768	16	Enschede	Overijssel	161,738
7	Tilburg	North Brabant	229,836	17	Zaanstad	North Holland	161,389
8	Almere	Flevoland	226,500	18	's-Hertogenbosch	North Brabant	160,757
9	Breda	North Brabant	188,078	19	Zwolle	Overijssel	133,141
10	Nijmegen	Gelderland	187,049	20	Leeuwarden	Friesland	128,810

==== Functional urban areas ====
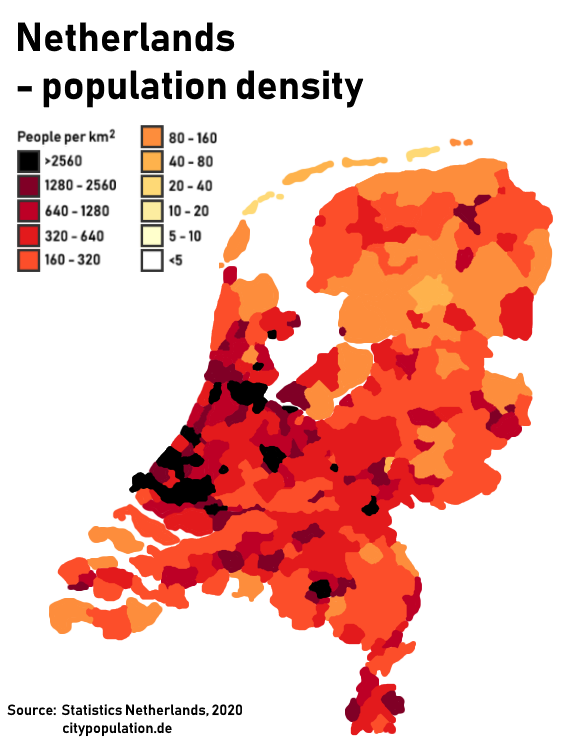
Population density in the Netherlands by municipality. The largest urban area, the Randstad is clearly visible along the west coast.

"Functional urban areas" are a type of urban areas with large populations where commuters from nearby areas work in the core area. There are several functional urban areas officially identified in the Netherlands. The largest ones (with populations over 300,000) are listed below, which count the populations of the core city and their "commuting zones".

Functional urban areas	Population (2015)
Amsterdam–Haarlem–Almere	2,751,000
Rotterdam–Dordrecht	1,805,000
The Hague–Delft	1,052,000
Utrecht	875,000
Eindhoven	736,000
Groningen	474,000
Arnhem	420,000
Enschede	401,000
Breda	367,000
Zwolle	350,000
Leiden	339,000
Nijmegen	322,000
Tilburg	310,000

== Vital statistics ==
=== Statistics ===
The following table presents the evolution:

Notable events in Dutch demographics:

- 1804–1815 – Napoleonic Wars
- 1845–1847 – European potato failure
- 1940–1945 – World War II
- 1946–1955 – Post-World War II baby boom

	Population (1 January)	Live births	Deaths	Natural change	Crude birth rate (per 1000)	Crude death rate (per 1000)	Natural change (per 1000)	Crude migration change (per 1000)	Total fertility rate	Infant mortality rate (per 1000)	Life expectancy males	Life expectancy females
1800	2,090,000	70,015	59,983	10,032	33.5	28.7	4.8					
1801	2,105,000	70,307	60,624	9,683	33.4	28.8	4.6	2.54				
1802	2,120,000	70,808	61,480	9,328	33.4	29.0	4.4	2.65				
1803	2,135,000	71,309	62,342	8,967	33.4	29.2	4.2	2.85				
1804	2,150,000	71,595	62,995	8,600	33.3	29.3	4.0	3.00				
1805	2,165,000	71,878	63,651	8,227	33.2	29.4	3.8	3.15				
1806	2,180,000	72,376	64,528	7,848	33.2	29.6	3.6	3.30				
1807	2,195,000	72,874	65,411	7,463	33.2	29.8	3.4	3.46				
1808	2,210,000	73,151	66,079	7,072	33.1	29.9	3.2	3.61				
1809	2,225,000	73,425	66,750	6,675	33.0	30.0	3.0	3.77				
1810	2,240,000	73,920	67,648	6,272	33.0	30.2	2.8	3.92				
1811	2,252,000	74,541	68,010	6,531	33.1	30.2	2.9	2.44				
1812	2,264,000	75,391	68,146	7,245	33.3	30.1	3.2	2.11				
1813	2,276,000	76,018	68,508	7,510	33.4	30.1	3.3	1.98				
1814	2,288,000	76,877	68,640	8,237	33.6	30.0	3.6	1.65				
1815	2,300,000	77,510	69,000	8,510	33.7	30.0	3.7	1.53				
1816	2,312,000	78,146	69,360	8,786	33.8	30.0	3.8	1.28				
1817	2,324,000	79,016	69,488	9,528	34.0	29.9	4.1	1.06				
1818	2,336,000	79,658	69,846	9,812	34.1	29.9	4.2	0.95				
1819	2,348,000	80,536	69,970	10,566	34.3	29.8	4.5	0.96				
1820	2,360,000	81,184	70,328	10,856	34.4	29.8	4.6	0.49				
1821	2,387,000	82,352	70,894	11,458	34.5	29.7	4.8	6.59				
1822	2,414,000	83,524	71,213	12,311	34.6	29.5	5.1	6.15				
1823	2,441,000	84,703	71,765	12,938	34.7	29.4	5.3	5.83				
1824	2,468,000	85,886	72,312	13,574	34.8	29.3	5.5	5.50				
1825	2,495,000	87,325	72,854	14,471	35.0	29.2	5.8	5.08				
1826	2,522,000	88,522	73,138	15,384	35.1	29.0	6.1	4.66				
1827	2,549,000	89,725	73,666	16,059	35.2	28.9	6.3	4.34				
1828	2,576,000	90,933	74,189	16,744	35.3	28.8	6.5	4.02				
1829	2,603,000	92,146	74,446	17,700	35.4	28.6	6.8	3.61				
1830	2,630,000	93,365	74,955	18,410	35.5	28.5	7.0	3.30				
1831	2,655,000	94,518	75,668	18,850	35.6	28.5	7.1	2.34				
1832	2,680,000	95,408	76,380	19,028	35.6	28.5	7.1	2.25				
1833	2,705,000	96,298	76,822	19,476	35.6	28.4	7.2	2.06				
1834	2,730,000	97,461	77,532	19,929	35.7	28.4	7.3	1.87				
1835	2,755,000	98,629	78,242	20,387	35.8	28.4	7.4	1.69				
1836	2,780,000	99,524	78,952	20,572	35.8	28.4	7.4	1.53				
1837	2,805,000	100,419	79,662	20,757	35.8	28.4	7.4	1.2				
1838	2,830,000	101,597	80,089	21,508	35.9	28.3	7.6	1.1				
1839	2,855,000	102,780	80,796	21,984	36.0	28.3	7.7	1.0				
1840	2,880,000	103,680	81,504	22,176	36.0	28.3	7.7	4.5	5.11			
1841	2,916,000	105,268	82,231	23,037	36.1	28.2	7.9	4.2	5.09			
1842	2,952,000	106,567	82,656	23,911	36.1	28.0	8.1	3.8	5.06			
1843	2,988,000	108,166	83,365	24,801	36.2	27.9	8.3	3.5	5.04			
1844	3,024,000	109,469	83,765	25,704	36.2	27.7	8.5	3.1	5.02			
1845	3,060,000	111,078	84,456	26,622	36.3	27.6	8.7	2.8	4.99			
1846	3,096,000	112,694	85,140	27,554	36.4	27.5	8.9	2.4	4.99			
1847	3,132,000	114,005	85,504	28,501	36.4	27.3	9.1	2.1	4.99			
1848	3,168,000	115,632	86,170	29,462	36.5	27.2	9.3	1.8	4.99			
1849	3,204,000	116,946	86,508	30,438	36.5	27.0	9.5	1.4	4.99			
1850	3,240,000	118,584	87,156	31,428	36.6	26.9	9.7	1.4	4.89			
1851	3,253,000	118,734	87,180	31,554	36.5	26.8	9.7	−5.7	4.80			
1852	3,266,000	119,209	86,876	32,333	36.5	26.6	9.9	−5.9	4.70			
1853	3,279,000	119,356	86,894	32,462	36.4	26.5	9.9	−6.0	4.60			
1854	3,292,000	119,500	86,580	32,920	36.3	26.3	10.0	−6.1	4.60			
1855	3,305,000	119,641	86,591	33,050	36.2	26.2	10.0	−6.1	4.60			
1856	3,318,000	120,112	86,600	33,512	36.2	26.1	10.1	−6.2	4.60			
1857	3,331,000	120,249	86,273	33,976	36.1	25.9	10.2	−6.3	4.60			
1858	3,344,000	120,384	86,275	34,109	36.0	25.8	10.2	−6.3	4.60			
1859	3,357,000	120,852	85,939	34,913	36.0	25.6	10.4	−6.6	4.68			
1860	3,370,000	120,983	85,935	35,048	35.9	25.5	10.4	−6.6	4.75			
1861	3,399,000	122,024	85,995	36,029	35.9	25.3	10.6	−2.1	4.83			
1862	3,428,000	122,722	86,386	36,336	35.8	25.2	10.6	−2.2	4.90			
1863	3,457,000	123,761	86,425	37,336	35.8	25.0	10.8	−2.4	4.98			
1864	3,486,000	124,450	86,453	37,997	35.7	24.8	10.9	−2.6	4.99			
1865	3,515,000	125,486	86,469	39,017	35.7	24.6	11.1	−2.9	5.01			
1866	3,544,000	126,521	86,828	39,693	35.7	24.5	11.2	−3.0	5.02			
1867	3,573,000	127,199	86,824	40,375	35.6	24.3	11.3	−3.2	5.04			
1868	3,602,000	128,231	86,808	41,423	35.6	24.1	11.5	−3.5	5.05			
1869	3,631,000	128,900	87,144	41,756	35.5	24.0	11.5	−3.5	5.09			
1870	3,660,000	129,930	87,108	42,822	35.5	23.8	11.7	−3.8	5.12			
1871	3,695,000	130,803	87,202	43,601	35.4	23.6	11.8	−2.4	5.16			
1872	3,730,000	132,042	87,655	44,387	35.4	23.5	11.9	−2.5	5.19			
1873	3,765,000	132,904	87,725	45,179	35.3	23.3	12.0	−2.7	5.23			
1874	3,800,000	134,140	87,780	46,360	35.3	23.1	12.2	−3.0	5.27			
1875	3,835,000	134,992	88,205	46,787	35.2	23.0	12.2	−3.1	5.31			
1876	3,870,000	135,837	88,236	47,601	35.1	22.8	12.3	−3.3	5.34			
1877	3,905,000	137,065	88,253	48,812	35.1	22.6	12.5	−3.6	5.38			
1878	3,940,000	137,900	88,256	49,644	35.0	22.4	12.6	−3.8	5.42			
1879	3,975,000	139,125	88,642	50,483	35.0	22.3	12.7	−3.9	5.39			
1880	4,010,000	139,949	88,621	51,328	34.9	22.1	12.8	−4.1	5.35			
1881	4,074,000	141,775	89,221	52,554	34.8	21.9	12.9	2.9	5.32			
1882	4,138,000	143,175	89,795	53,380	34.6	21.7	12.9	2.8	5.28			
1883	4,202,000	144,969	90,763	54,206	34.5	21.6	12.9	2.8	5.25			
1884	4,266,000	146,324	91,292	55,032	34.3	21.4	12.9	2.8	5.23			
1885	4,330,000	148,086	91,796	56,290	34.2	21.2	13.0	1.8	5.21			
1886	4,394,000	149,835	92,274	57,561	34.1	21.0	13.1	1.5	5.18			
1887	4,458,000	151,126	92,726	58,400	33.9	20.8	13.1	1.3	5.16			
1888	4,522,000	152,844	93,605	59,239	33.8	20.7	13.1	1.1	5.14			
1889	4,586,000	154,090	94,013	60,077	33.6	20.5	13.1	0.9	5.11			
1890	4,650,000	155,775	94,395	61,380	33.5	20.3	13.2	0.6	5.07			
1891	4,695,000	156,813	94,370	62,443	33.4	20.1	13.3	−3.8	5.04			
1892	4,740,000	157,842	94,326	63,516	33.3	19.9	13.4	−3.9	5.00			
1893	4,785,000	158,862	94,264	64,598	33.2	19.7	13.5	−4.1	4.97			
1894	4,830,000	159,873	94,185	65,688	33.1	19.5	13.6	−4.3	4.93			
1895	4,875,000	160,875	94,088	66,787	33.0	19.3	13.7	−4.5	4.88			
1896	4,920,000	161,376	93,972	67,404	32.8	19.1	13.7	−4.6	4.84			
1897	4,965,000	162,356	93,838	68,518	32.7	18.9	13.8	−4.8	4.79			
1898	5,010,000	163,326	93,687	69,639	32.6	18.7	13.9	−5.0	4.75			
1899	5,055,000	164,288	93,517	70,771	32.5	18.5	14.0	−5.1	4.60			
1900	5,100,000	165,240	93,330	71,910	32.4	18.3	14.1	−5.3	4.45	155.2		
1901	5,221,000	168,380	89,967	78,413	32.3	17.2	15.0	1.1	4.53	149.3		
1902	5,305,000	168,728	86,248	82,480	31.8	16.3	15.5	0.3	4.46	129.9		
1903	5,389,000	170,108	83,933	86,175	31.6	15.6	16.0	−1.0	4.42	135.1		
1904	5,470,000	171,495	87,091	84,404	31.4	15.9	15.4	−0.6	4.38	136.9		
1905	5,551,000	170,767	85,016	85,751	30.8	15.3	15.4	−0.8	4.29	130.9		
1906	5,632,000	170,952	83,259	87,693	30.4	14.8	15.6	−1.8	4.23	127.1		
1907	5,710,000	171,506	82,250	89,256	30.0	14.4	15.6	−2.3	4.18	111.9		
1908	5,786,000	171,861	86,936	84,925	29.7	15.0	14.7	−1.6	4.13	124.8		
1909	5,862,000	170,766	80,283	90,483	29.1	13.7	15.4	−9.1	4.04	99.1		
1910	5,899,000	168,894	79,984	88,910	28.6	13.6	15.1	−2.0	3.94	107.9		
1911	5,976,000	166,527	86,786	79,741	27.9	14.5	13.3	−0.2	3.81	137.2		
1912	6,054,000	170,269	74,647	95,622	28.1	12.3	15.8	−0.8	3.84	87.0		
1913	6,145,000	173,541	75,867	97,674	28.2	12.3	15.9	1.3	3.85	91.4		
1914	6,251,000	176,831	77,739	99,092	28.3	12.4	15.9	2.2	3.86	94.8		
1915	6,364,000	167,426	79,613	87,813	26.3	12.5	13.8	4.4	3.59	86.8		
1916	6,480,000	172,572	84,024	88,548	26.6	13.0	13.7	6.7	3.64	84.5		
1917	6,612,000	173,112	87,273	85,839	26.2	13.2	13.0	1.1	3.59	86.8		
1918	6,705,000	167,636	115,440	52,196	25.0	17.2	7.8	−0.8	3.47	103.9		
1919	6,752,000	164,447	89,646	74,801	24.4	13.3	11.1	−1.0	3.36	94.0		
1920	6,820,000	192,987	81,525	111,462	28.3	12.0	16.3	−1.5	3.89	83.3		
1921	6,921,000	189,546	77,002	112,544	27.4	11.1	16.3	−0.3	3.75	86.1		
1922	7,032,000	181,886	80,381	101,505	25.9	11.4	14.4	2.4	3.54	77.6		
1923	7,150,000	187,512	72,809	114,703	26.2	10.2	16.0	−0.1	3.55	66.8		
1924	7,264,000	182,430	71,167	111,263	25.1	9.8	15.3	−1.3	3.39	60.6		
1925	7,366,000	178,545	72,121	106,424	24.2	9.8	14.4	0	3.26	58.4		
1926	7,472,000	177,498	73,357	104,141	23.8	9.8	13.9	0	3.18	61.1		
1927	7,576,000	175,098	77,614	97,484	23.1	10.2	12.9	0.6	3.08	58.7		
1928	7,678,000	179,028	73,816	105,212	23.3	9.6	13.7	−0.3	3.09	52.3		
1929	7,781,000	177,216	83,224	93,992	22.8	10.7	12.1	1.1	3.00	59.0		
1930	7,884,000	182,310	71,682	110,628	23.1	9.1	14.0	0.6	3.03	50.9		
1931	7,999,000	177,387	77,048	100,339	22.2	9.6	12.5	2.9	2.88	49.6		
1932	8,122,000	178,525	73,059	105,466	22.0	9.0	13.0	1.2	2.83	46.3		
1933	8,237,000	171,289	72,096	99,193	20.8	8.8	12.0	0.6	2.66	43.9		
1934	8,341,000	172,214	70,164	102,050	20.6	8.4	12.2	−1.2	2.63	42.6		
1935	8,433,000	170,425	73,660	96,765	20.2	8.7	11.5	−1.7	2.57	40.0		
1936	8,516,000	171,675	73,923	97,752	20.2	8.7	11.5	−1.9	2.51	38.9		
1937	8,598,000	170,220	75,516	94,704	19.8	8.8	11.0	−1.0	2.53	38.1		
1938	8,684,000	178,422	77,043	101,379	20.5	8.9	11.7	−0.5	2.63	36.5		
1939	8,781,000	180,917	75,841	105,076	20.6	8.6	12.0	−0.8	2.64	33.7		
1940	8,879,000	184,846	87,722	97,124	20.8	9.9	10.9	−1.2	2.67	39.1		
1941	8,965,000	181,959	89,716	92,243	20.3	10.0	10.3	−1.7	2.61	43.6		
1942	9,042,000	189,975	76,040	113,935	21.0	8.4	12.6	−6.0	2.71	39.5		
1943	9,102,000	209,379	91,438	117,941	23.0	10.0	13.0	−5.1	2.98	40.1		
1944	9,174,000	219,946	108,087	111,859	24.0	11.8	12.2	−2.6	3.13	46.3		
1945	9,262,000	209,607	141,398	68,209	22.6	15.3	7.4	10.0	2.96	79.7		
1946	9,423,000	284,456	80,151	204,305	30.2	8.5	21.7	0.2	3.97	38.7		
1947	9,629,000	267,348	77,646	189,702	27.8	8.1	19.7	−1.9	3.70	33.5		
1948	9,800,000	247,923	72,459	175,464	25.3	7.4	17.9	−2.0	3.41	29.3		
1949	9,956,000	236,177	81,077	155,100	23.7	8.1	15.6	−8.5	3.22	26.8		
1950	10,026,773	229,718	75,929	153,789	22.7	7.5	15.2	2.1	3.097	26.7	70.3	72.6
1951	10,200,280	228,405	77,560	150,845	22.3	7.6	14.7	−2.1	3.051	26.7	70.2	72.8
1952	10,328,343	231,888	76,346	155,542	22.3	7.4	15.0	−4.6	3.087	24.1	71.0	73.3
1953	10,435,631	227,964	80,901	147,063	21.7	7.7	14.0	−3.0	3.033	23.7	70.4	73.0
1954	10,550,737	228,173	79,623	148,550	21.5	7.5	14.0	−1.7	3.029	22.6	71.0	73.8
1955	10,680,023	229,222	81,708	147,514	21.3	7.6	13.7	−0.4	3.033	21.6	70.9	71.4
1956	10,821,661	231,492	84,809	146,683	21.3	7.8	13.5	−1.0	3.054	20.2	71.0	74.1
1957	10,957,040	233,892	82,961	150,931	21.2	7.5	13.7	−1.0	3.080	18.4	71.4	74.6
1958	11,095,726	236,859	84,491	152,368	21.2	7.6	13.6	2.8	3.107	18.5	71.5	74.8
1959	11,278,024	242,518	86,072	156,446	21.4	7.6	13.8	−1.7	3.171	18.1	71.2	75.2
1960	11,417,254	239,128	87,825	151,303	20.8	7.7	13.2	−1.0	3.122	17.9	71.4	75.3
1961	11,556,008	247,407	88,321	159,086	21.3	7.6	13.7	0.6	3.217	17.0	71.5	75.7
1962	11,721,416	246,150	93,969	152,181	20.7	7.9	12.8	1.6	3.176	17.0	71.0	75.6
1963	11,889,962	249,879	95,734	154,145	20.8	8.0	12.8	0	3.193	15.8	71.0	75.8
1964	12,041,970	250,914	93,437	157,477	20.5	7.7	12.9	1.2	3.166	14.8	71.3	76.3
1965	12,212,269	245,216	98,026	147,190	19.8	7.9	11.9	1.6	3.039	14.4	71.1	76.1
1966	12,377,194	239,611	100,516	139,095	19.1	8.0	11.1	1.7	2.903	14.7	71.0	76.1
1967	12,535,307	238,678	99,792	138,886	18.9	7.9	11.0	−1.0	2.814	13.4	71.2	76.6
1968	12,661,095	237,112	104,989	132,123	18.6	8.3	10.4	0.4	2.716	13.6	70.9	76.4
1969	12,798,346	247,588	107,615	139,973	19.1	8.3	10.8	1.6	2.748	13.2	70.9	76.3
1970	12,957,621	238,912	109,619	129,293	18.3	8.4	9.9	2.6	2.572	12.7	70.8	76.5
1971	13,119,430	227,180	110,243	116,937	17.1	8.3	8.8	2.6	2.362	12.1	71.0	76.8
1972	13,269,563	214,133	113,576	100,557	16.1	8.5	7.5	1.4	2.151	11.7	70.8	76.5
1973	13,387,623	194,993	110,682	84,311	14.5	8.2	6.3	1.4	1.904	11.5	71.3	77.1
1974	13,491,020	185,982	109,250	76,732	13.7	8.1	5.7	2.3	1.773	11.3	71.6	77.6
1975	13,599,092	177,876	113,737	64,139	13.0	8.3	4.7	5.2	1.664	10.6	71.5	77.7
1976	13,733,578	177,090	114,454	62,636	12.9	8.3	4.5	1.4	1.632	10.7	71.5	77.9
1977	13,814,495	173,296	110,093	63,203	12.5	7.9	4.6	1.4	1.579	9.5	72.1	78.5
1978	13,897,874	175,550	114,415	61,135	12.6	8.2	4.4	1.9	1.583	9.6	72.0	78.5
1979	13,985,526	174,979	112,565	62,414	12.5	8.0	4.4	3.1	1.563	8.7	72.5	78.9
1980	14,091,014	181,294	114,279	67,015	12.8	8.1	4.7	3.6	1.602	8.6	72.5	79.2
1981	14,208,586	178,569	115,515	63,054	12.5	8.1	4.4	1.0	1.563	8.3	72.7	79.3
1982	14,285,829	172,071	117,264	54,807	12.0	8.2	3.8	0	1.496	8.3	72.8	79.4
1983	14,339,551	170,246	117,761	52,485	11.9	8.2	3.7	0.1	1.468	8.4	72.9	79.6
1984	14,394,589	174,436	119,812	54,624	12.1	8.3	3.8	0.3	1.491	8.3	73.0	79.7
1985	14,453,833	178,136	122,704	55,432	12.3	8.5	3.8	1.4	1.511	8.0	73.1	79.7
1986	14,529,430	184,513	125,307	59,206	12.7	8.6	4.1	1.8	1.552	7.7	73.1	79.6
1987	14,615,125	186,667	122,199	64,468	12.7	8.3	4.4	2.4	1.558	7.6	73.5	80.1
1988	14,714,948	186,647	124,163	62,484	12.6	8.4	4.2	1.9	1.545	6.8	73.7	80.2
1989	14,805,240	188,979	128,905	60,086	12.7	8.7	4.0	1.9	1.553	6.8	73.7	79.9
1990	14,892,574	197,965	128,824	69,115	13.2	8.6	4.6	3.3	1.617	7.1	73.8	80.1
1991	15,010,445	198,665	129,958	68,707	13.2	8.6	4.6	3.3	1.612	6.5	74.1	80.2
1992	15,129,150	196,734	129,887	66,847	13.0	8.6	4.4	2.9	1.587	6.3	74.3	80.3
1993	15,239,182	195,748	137,795	57,953	12.8	9.0	3.8	2.9	1.572	6.3	74.0	80.0
1994	15,341,553	195,611	133,471	62,140	12.7	8.7	4.0	1.4	1.569	5.6	74.6	80.3
1995	15,424,122	190,513	135,675	54,838	12.3	8.8	3.5	1.0	1.531	5.5	74.6	80.4
1996	15,493,889	189,521	137,561	51,960	12.2	8.9	3.3	1.4	1.529	5.7	74.7	80.4
1997	15,567,107	192,443	135,783	56,660	12.3	8.7	3.6	2.0	1.562	5.0	75.2	80.6
1998	15,654,192	199,412	137,968	61,444	12.7	8.8	3.9	2.9	1.628	5.2	75.2	80.7
1999	15,760,225	200,445	140,487	59,958	12.7	8.9	3.8	2.8	1.652	5.2	75.3	80.5
2000	15,863,950	206,619	140,527	66,092	13.0	8.8	4.2	3.6	1.723	5.1	75.5	80.6
2001	15,985,538	202,603	140,377	62,226	12.6	8.7	3.9	3.5	1.710	5.4	75.8	80.7
2002	16,105,285	202,083	142,355	59,728	12.5	8.8	3.7	1.7	1.731	5.0	76.0	80.7
2003	16,192,572	200,297	141,936	58,361	12.3	8.7	3.6	0.4	1.747	4.8	76.2	80.9
2004	16,258,032	194,007	136,553	57,454	11.9	8.4	3.5	-0.6	1.726	4.4	76.9	81.4
2005	16,305,526	187,910	136,402	51,508	11.5	8.4	3.2	−1.4	1.708	4.9	77.2	81.6
2006	16,334,210	185,057	135,372	49,685	11.3	8.3	3.0	−1.5	1.720	4.4	77.6	81.9
2007	16,357,992	181,336	133,022	48,314	11.1	8.1	2.9	0	1.718	4.1	78.0	82.3
2008	16,405,399	184,634	135,136	49,498	11.2	8.2	3.0	1.9	1.773	3.8	78.3	82.3
2009	16,485,787	184,915	134,235	50,680	11.2	8.1	3.1	2.3	1.790	3.8	78.5	82.7
2010	16,574,989	184,397	136,058	48,339	11.1	8.2	2.9	2.0	1.796	3.8	78.8	82.7
2011	16,655,799	180,060	135,741	44,319	10.8	8.1	2.7	1.8	1.759	3.6	79.2	82.8
2012	16,730,348	175,959	140,813	35,146	10.5	8.4	2.1	0.8	1.723	3.7	79.1	82.8
2013	16,779,575	171,341	141,245	30,096	10.2	8.4	1.8	1.2	1.679	3.8	79.4	83.0
2014	16,829,289	175,181	139,073	35,434	10.3	8.2	2.1	2.1	1.713	3.6	79.9	83.3
2015	16,900,726	170,510	147,134	23,376	10.0	8.7	1.3	3.3	1.658	3.3	79.7	83.1
2016	16,979,000	172,520	148,997	23,523	10.2	8.8	1.3	4.7	1.663	3.5	79.9	83.1
2017	17,081,507	169,836	150,214	19,622	9.9	8.8	1.1	4.7	1.619	3.6	80.1	83.3
2018	17,181,084	168,525	153,363	15,162	9.8	8.9	0.9	5.0	1.586	3.5	80.2	83.3
2019	17,282,163	169,680	151,885	17,795	9.8	8.8	1.0	6.3	1.574	3.6	80.5	83.6
2020	17,407,585	168,681	168,678	3	9.7	9.7	0.0	3.9	1.545	3.8	79.7	83.1
2021	17,475,415	179,441	170,972	8,469	10.2	9.8	0.4	6.2	1.624	3.3	79.7	83.0
2022	17,590,672	167,504	170,112	−2,608	9.5	9.6	−0.1	12.7	1.487	3.8	80.1	83.1
2023	17,811,291	164,487	169,521	−5,034	9.2	9.5	−0.3	8.2	1.430	3.6	80.3	83.3
2024	17,942,942	166,143	172,165	−6,022	9.2	9.6	−0.4	5.5	1.426	3.3	80.5	83.3
2025	18,044,027	166,588	173,494	−6,906	9.2	9.6	−0.4	6.0	1.418	3.4		
2026	18,130,208											

=== Current vital statistics ===
Source: Centraal Bureau voor de Statistiek

Period	Live births	Deaths	Natural increase
January–September 2025	125,723	129,247	−3,524
January–September 2026	126,920	130,691	−3,771
Difference	▲ +1,197 (+0.95%)	▲ +1,444 (+1.1%)	▼ −247

=== Total fertility rates by province ===
2024
Province	TFR
Zeeland	1.60
Drenthe	1.59
Flevoland	1.58
Friesland	1.57
Overijssel	1.57
Gelderland	1.51
Utrecht	1.46
North Brabant	1.44
The Netherlands	1.43
South Holland	1.41
Limburg	1.35
Noord-Holland	1.31
Groningen	1.25

=== Births by origin and birthplace of mother ===
2025
Country of birth/origin	
Total births	166,588 (100%)
Total Dutch-born mothers	129,417 (77.69%)
Mothers of Dutch origin	106,415 (63.88%)
Dutch-born mothers of European origin	3,850 (2.31%)
Dutch-born mothers of non-European origin	19,152 (11.50%)
Total foreign-born mothers	37,171 (22.31%)
Foreign-born mothers of European origin	11,894 (7.14%)
Foreign-born mothers of non-European origin	25,277 (15.17%)

=== Structure of the population ===
Population by Sex and Age Group (Census 01.I.2011):

Age group	Male	Female	Total	%
Total	8 243 482	8 412 317	16 655 799	100
0–4	472 308	450 798	923 106	5.54
5–9	503 882	481 347	985 229	5.92
10–14	510 974	487 766	998 740	6.00
15–19	514 830	491 914	1 006 744	6.04
20–24	522 667	512 062	1 034 729	6.21
25–29	504 117	497 421	1 001 538	6.01
30–34	503 323	501 441	1 004 764	6.03
35–39	560 289	561 279	1 121 568	6.73
40–44	653 664	642 261	1 295 925	7.78
45–49	655 302	642 990	1 298 292	7.79
50–54	601 040	595 279	1 196 319	7.18
55–59	546 952	543 295	1 090 247	6.55
60–64	553 446	550 206	1 103 652	6.63
65–69	390 725	399 835	790 560	4.75
70–74	302 542	334 976	637 518	3.83
75–79	219 108	280 213	499 321	3.00
80–84	139 348	221 480	360 828	2.17
85–89	66 949	145 107	212 056	1.27
90–94	18 812	57 379	76 191	0.46
95+	3 204	15 268	18 472	0.11
Age group	Male	Female	Total	Percent
0–14	1 487 164	1 419 911	2 907 075	17.45
15–64	5 615 630	5 538 148	11 153 778	66.97
65+	1 140 688	1 454 258	2 594 946	15.58

Population Estimates by Sex and Age Group (01.I.2021):

Age group	Male	Female	Total	%
Total	8 686 536	8 788 879	17 475 415	100
0–4	439 516	418 110	857 626	4.91
5–9	461 357	438 470	899 827	5.15
10–14	488 746	465 532	954 278	5.46
15–19	527 596	504 139	1 031 735	5.90
20–24	563 311	544 175	1 107 486	6.34
25–29	575 570	557 372	1 132 942	6.48
30–34	570 427	556 062	1 126 489	6.45
35–39	530 309	523 777	1 054 086	6.03
40–44	516 034	517 454	1 033 488	5.91
45–49	562 979	569 595	1 132 574	6.48
50–54	644 880	641 251	1 286 131	7.36
55–59	633 972	629 585	1 263 557	7.23
60–64	566 770	570 891	1 137 661	6.51
65–69	496 148	507 630	1 003 778	5.74
70–74	474 058	496 978	971 036	5.56
75–79	303 655	340 405	644 060	3.69
80–84	196 115	253 008	449 123	2.57
85–89	97 307	160 502	257 809	1.48
90–94	31 861	73 187	105 048	0.60
95–99	5 514	18 631	24 145	0.14
100–104	406	2 040	2 446	0.01
105–109	5	84	89	<0.01
110+	0	1	1	<0.01
Age group	Male	Female	Total	Percent
0–14	1 389 619	1 322 112	2 711 731	15.52
15–64	5 691 848	5 614 301	11 306 149	64.70
65+	1 605 069	1 852 466	3 457 535	19.79

== Migration and origin groups ==
Between 1590 and 1800 the estimated share of foreign-born population was consistently above 5%.

According to Eurostat, in 2010 there were 1,800,000 foreign-born residents in the Netherlands, corresponding to 11.1% of the total population. Of these, 1,400,000 (8.5%) were born outside the EU (including those from Dutch colonies) and 428,000 (2.6%) were born in another EU member state. The most common countries of birth being: Belgium, Germany, Poland and the United Kingdom. On 1 January 2016, 26.2% of persons aged 0–50 had at least one parent born in a foreign country. 11.4% of persons aged 0–50 of 'Dutch background' belonged to the 'third generation', the majority descending from Western immigrants. The third generation constitutes persons born from two second generation immigrants or one second generation immigrant and one person with a Dutch background. First and second generation immigrants and the third generation were 34.5% of the population aged 0–50.

As the result of immigration from overseas, the Netherlands have a sizeable minority of non-indigenous peoples. There is also a considerable level of emigration, in majority consisting of former immigrants. In 2005, some 121,000 people left the country, while 94,000 entered it. Out of a total of 101,150 people immigrating into the Netherlands in 2006, 66,658 were from Europe, Oceania, the Americas or Japan, and 34,492 were from other (mostly developing) countries. Out of a total of 132,470 emigrants, 94,834 were going to Europe, Oceania, the Americas or Japan and 37,636 to other countries.

A large number of immigrants come from countries in Western Europe, mostly from the neighbouring countries of Germany and Belgium. There were five subsequent waves of immigration to the Netherlands in recent history.

1. In the late-1940s and into the 1950s, following the end of the Second World War, people from the newly independent Republic of Indonesia repatriated or emigrated to the Netherlands – mainly Indo-European (people of mixed European and Indonesian ancestry of Dutch nationality) and supporters of the Republic of South Maluku.
2. Between 1960 and 1974, migrants from Greece, Portugal, Spain, Turkey and Morocco came to work in the Netherlands as guest workers. They were expected to return to their own country and many did, but others remained and in the 1970s and 1980s were joined by their families. Until 2004, when marriage immigration was restricted, their children usually married others from their home country.
3. After 1974, people emigrated from the newly independent Suriname and from the Netherlands Antilles, which remained part of the Kingdom of the Netherlands. In 1974, about forty thousand Surinamese migrated while still retaining Dutch citizenship; between 1975 and 1980 there was a transitional arrangement allowing migration. Antilleans have the Dutch nationality and behave like typical labour migrants, travelling to and from the country in response to the employment available.
4. During the 1970s and 1980s, the number of asylum seekers was low, consisting e.g. of Chileans fleeing from political oppression and/or persecution. In the 1990s, asylum migration sharply increased, largely consisting of Yugoslavs, Somalis, Iraqis, Iranians, Ethiopians, Eritreans, Afghans and Vietnamese, fleeing war or famine. Between 2000 and 2014 asylum migration strongly decreased due to the strict "Cohen Law". However, the Syrian Civil War from 2011 resulted in a large influx of Syrian asylum seekers in 2015 and 2016; about ninety thousand Syrians had been granted asylum by 2018.
5. Since the 2000s, migrant workers and their families from the newly joined EU member states in Central and Eastern Europe, including: Poland, and Bulgaria, and non-EU states, Ukraine and the former Yugoslavia. In addition, a number of Spaniards, Greeks, Italians, and Portuguese also migrated due to the impact of the Great Recession in those countries. In 2005, non-Western ethnic population comprised 1.7 million individuals, about 10% of the population in the country.

Illegal immigration to the Netherlands results in automatic deportation but this is often not enforced for various reasons such as unknown country of origin, etc. Many Dutch provinces in 2012 had quotas for deporting illegal immigrants.

By 2017, persons with a migration background, both western and non-western, formed a majority in Amsterdam (2011), Rotterdam (2013) and The Hague, the three largest cities of the Netherlands.

In 2005, the governmental Sociaal en Cultureel Planbureau in its annual report, noted recurring integration problems for ethnic minorities. While during the economic boom of the 1990s their unemployment and dependence on welfare had strongly decreased, the economic downturn between 2001 and 2004 disproportionally affected immigrant groups. This would be explained by their functioning as a labour reserve, by their lower educational levels and by lower language skills. The report also noted that per capita social interactions between native Dutch and immigrant populations tended to decline over time, partly explainable by the size growth of immigrant groups. Integration levels strongly varied between groups. Surinamese and Antilleans were well economically integrated, but the latter less so culturally. Cultural integration was limited for Turks, but better for Moroccans. Of the asylum seekers, Somalis were among the least integrated into Dutch society, while Iranians were the best integrated with the highest education levels and modern lifestyles. Though the educational levels of the second generation were a significant improvement over those of the first generation, they still lagged behind the native Dutch who themselves on average had been attending ever higher school types. While half of all native Dutch pupils in 2005 proceeded to higher secondary education (HAVO and VWO), for Turks and Moroccans the share was a fifth and for Somali pupils even lower.

In 2007, non-Western groups were generally socio-economically disadvantaged. Of the four largest non-Western groups, Turks and Moroccans were the most disadvantaged. In 2006, only 38.7% of Moroccans and 43.9% of Turks aged 15–64 were employed, meaning their unemployment rate was about four times that of the native Dutch (17.2% for Moroccans and 15.1% for Turks), and 30% received some type of social welfare.

The 2008 financial crisis and the Euro area crisis affected immigrant groups particularly hard. In 2012, at 12% non-Western migrants were six times more likely than native Dutch to receive social welfare benefits, with 2% for the Dutch.

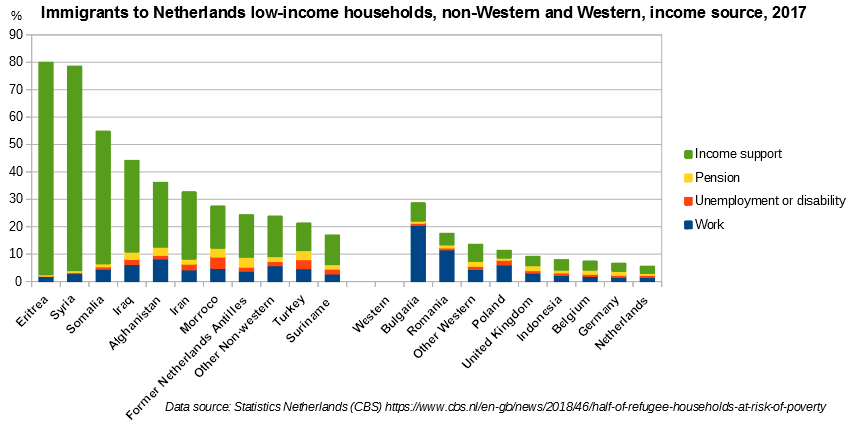
Western and non-Western fraction of low-income households and source of income. Data sourced from Statistics Netherlands.

According to a 2010 Statistics Netherlands report, the third generation of non-Western immigrants was predominantly young with 80% being younger than 15, while growing with 10% each year. The third generation have a similar employment rate as the native Dutch and receive a similar amount of social benefits. The third non-Western generation follow adult education more frequently than both the native Dutch and non-Western immigrants. The non-Western immigrant population as a whole has 1.5 to 2 times the benefit dependence compared to the natives. The non-Western third generation had a rate slightly higher than the native Dutch as crime suspects, but lower than for non-Western immigrants as a whole.

According to Statistics Netherlands, nearly 53% of refugee households have a low income, six times the Netherlands average (8.2%). For Syrian and Eritrean households the share is about 80%. At 33% the poverty risk is lowest among Iranian refugee households. The group of Syrian households at risk of poverty grew from ten thousand (76% of all Syrian households in 2016) to eighteen thousand (79% of all Syrian households) in 2018. Households of Polish, Romanian or Bulgarian origin have a greater than average risk of poverty even though households from these Eastern European countries generally depend on work for their income. Migrant workers from Eastern Europe generally perform low-skilled work while migrants from Western Europe are often highly educated.

Immigrants from foreign countries are divided into several ethnic groups. For example, there are both Russians and Chechens from Russia, Turks and Kurds from Turkey, Serbs and Albanians from Serbia and immigrants from Iran are divided into Persians, Azeris and Kurds.

=== Net migration of the Netherlands, 1995–present ===
Netherlands Migration Data
Year	Immigration	Emigration	Net immigration
1995	96,099	82,195	+13,904
1996	108,749	91,945	+16,804
1997	109,860	81,973	+27,887
1998	122,407	79,289	+43,118
1999	119,151	78,779	+40,372
2000	132,850	78,977	+53,873
2001	133,404	82,566	+50,838
2002	121,250	96,918	+24,332
2003	104,514	104,831	−317
2004	94,019	110,235	−16,216
2005	92,297	119,725	−27,428
2006	101,150	132,470	−31,320
2007	116,819	122,576	−5,757
2008	143,516	117,779	+25,737
2009	146,378	111,897	+34,481
2010	154,432	121,351	+33,081
2011	162,962	133,194	+29,768
2012	158,374	144,491	+13,883
2013	164,772	145,669	+19,103
2014	182,949	147,862	+35,087
2015	204,615	149,509	+55,106
2016	230,739	151,545	+79,194
2017	234,957	154,292	+80,665
2018	243,737	157,366	+86,371
2019	269,064	161,029	+108,035
2020	220,853	152,494	+68,359
2021	252,528	145,330	+107,198
2022	403,108	179,310	+223,798
2023	335,668	198,310	+137,358
2024	316,305	208,537	+107,768
2025	308,357	214,821	+93,536

=== National origins ===
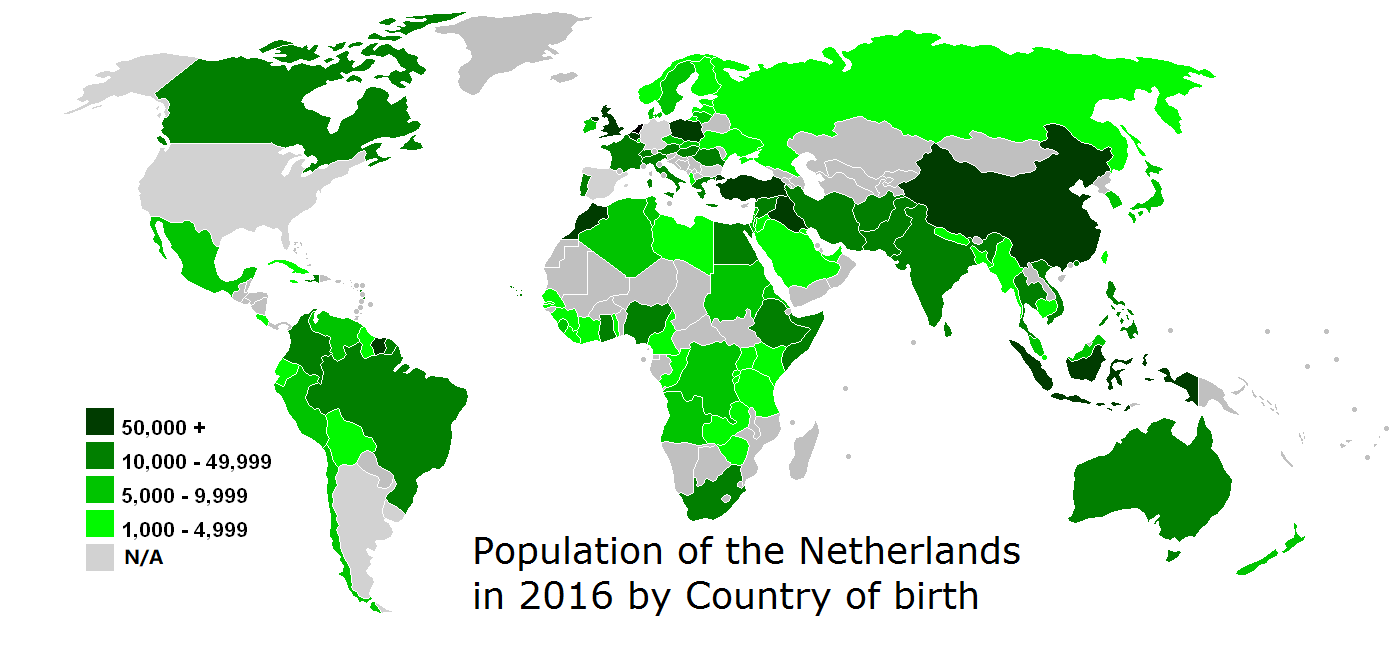
Population of the Netherlands by country of birth

Pie chart showing the breakdown of the Netherlands by national origin (2026)
1. Dutch (70.9%)
2. Turks (2.65%)
3. Moroccans (2.41%)
4. Surinamese (2.04%)
5. Indos (1.92%)
6. Germans (1.86%)
7. Former Soviets (1.56%)
8. Poles (1.35%)
9. Syrians (1.21%)
10. Antilleans (1.10%)
11. Other (13.0%)

As of 1 January 2026, 5,271,067 citizens are of non-Dutch/Frisian origin. A majority of these (51,6%) are from eight backgrounds alone: Turks (inc. Kurds), Moroccans (inc. Berbers), Surinamese, Indonesians (inc. Moluccans), Germans, Former Soviets (Note: Primarily Estonians, Lithuanians, Latvians, Russians and Ukrainians), Poles and Syrians.

With the huge expansion of the European Union during the 2000s, the Netherlands has seen a rise in the number of immigrants coming from new member states. Migrant workers from these countries are estimated to be about 100,000 as of 2007. Legal migrants from new EU-member states doubled between 2007–11 to 200,000, with estimates totaling up to 300,000. Of the Poles who initially moved to the Netherlands in 2004, about a quarter had returned to Poland by 2006. In addition, a large number of Syrians moved to the Netherlands in the 2010s mostly as refugees, with the population increasing seven-fold between 2014 and 2019. Both Poles and Syrians have overtaken the population of Antilleans during the decade. More than 36,000 Roma live in the Netherlands. Dutch Roma, Sinti and Dutch Jews were decimated by the Holocaust. However, the Jewish population has seen growth in the Netherlands in recent years.

As of 1 January 2026:

National origins/Migration background	2026	2025	2024	2023	2022	2021	2020	2019	2018	2017	2016	2015	2014	2013	2012	2010
Dutch (& Frisians)	12 859 141 (70.93%)	12 902 189 (71.50%)	12 941 748 (72.13%)	12 978 154 (72.86%)	13 013 279 (73.98%)	13 169 507 (75.36%)	13 186 880 (75.75%)	13 196 025 (76.36%)	13 209 225 (76.88%)	13 218 754 (77.39%)	13 226 829 (77.90%)	13 235 405 (78.31%)	13 234 545 (78.64%)	13 236 494 (78.89%)	13 236 618 (79.12%)	13 215 458 (79.73%)
Turks (& Kurds)	479 880 (2.65%)	468 726 (2.60%)	457 100 (2.55%)	444 329 (2.49%)	430 682 (2.45%)	422 030 (2.415%)	416 864 (2.395%)	409 877 (2.37%)	404 459 (2.35%)	400 367 (2.34%)	397 471 (2.34%)	396 555 (2.35%)	396 414 (2.36%)	392 923 (2.34%)	392 923 (2.35%)	384 164 (2.32%)
Moroccans (& Berbers)	437 328 (2.41%)	433 337 (2.40%)	429 176 (2.39%)	425 034 (2.39%)	419 442 (2.38%)	414 186 (2.37%)	408 864 (2.35%)	402 492 (2.33%)	396 539 (2.31%)	391 088 (2.29%)	385 761 (2.27%)	380 755 (2.25%)	374 996 (2.23%)	368 838 (2.20%)	362 954 (2.17%)	349 270 (2.11%)
Surinamese	370 281 (2.04%)	367 771 (2.04%)	365 352 (2.04%)	363 142 (2.04%)	361 632 (2.06%)	358 266 (2.05%)	356 402 (2.05%)	353 909 (2.05%)	351 681 (2.05%)	349 978 (2.05%)	349 022 (2.06%)	348 662 (2.06%)	348 291 (2.07%)	344 734 (2.05%)	344 734 (2.06%)	342 016 (2.06%)
Indos (& Moluccans)	347 997 (1.92%)	352 259 (1.95%)	356 566 (1.99%)	360 281 (2.02%)	363 873 (2.07%)	352 266 (2.016%)	356 029 (2.045%)	358 773 (2.08%)	361 594 (2.10%)	364 328 (2.13%)	366 849 (2.16%)	369 661 (2.19%)	372 233 (2.21%)	374 847 (2.23%)	377 618 (2.26%)	382 319 (2.31%)
Germans	336 693 (1.86%)	342 649 (1.90%)	348 712 (1.94%)	353 221 (1.98%)	357 111 (2.03%)	345 746 (1.98%)	349 284 (2.006%)	351 552 (2.03%)	354 136 (2.06%)	356 875 (2.09%)	360 116 (2.12%)	364 125 (2.15%)	368 512 (2.19%)	?	?	379 017 (2.29%)
Former Soviets (Note: Primarily Estonians, Lithuanians, Latvians, Russians and Ukrainians)	283 373 (1.56%)	265 220 (1.47%)	245 828 (1.37%)	218 430 (1.23%)	119 155 (0.68%)	110 877		92 128 (0.53%)		84 498 (0.49%)	80 013 (0.47%)	76 102 (0.45%)	?	?	?	?
Poles	244 835 (1.35%)	244 547 (1.36%)	241 403 (1.35%)	233 075 (1.31%)	221 637 (1.26%)	209 278 (1.2%)	198 024 (1.14%)	185 497 (1.07%)	173 050 (1.01%)	161 158 (0.94%)	149 831 (0.88%)	137 794 (0.82%)	123 003 (0.73%)	111 121 (0.66%)	100 775 (0.60%)	77 178 (0.47%)
Syrians	219 427 (1.21%)	192 421 (1.07%)	165 557 (0.92%)	144 991 (0.81%)	126 310 (0.72%)	113 126 (0.65%)	105 440 (0.61%)	98 090 (0.57%)	90 771 (0.53%)	72 903 (0.43%)	43 838 (0.26%)	22 568 (0.13%)	13 744 (0.08%)	11 665 (0.07%)	11 025 (0.07%)	10 263 (0.06%)
Antilleans	199 164 (1.10%)	197 449 (1.09%)	194 454 (1.08%)	190 180 (1.07%)	184 992 (1.05%)	160 429 (0.92%)	158 487 (0.91%)	155 492 (0.90%)	153 469 (0.90%)	150 981 (0.89%)	148 926 (0.88%)	146 855 (0.87%)	145 499 (0.87%)	143 992 (0.86%)	138 113 (0.83%)	134 486 (0.82%)
Curaçao	151 258 (0.9%)	150 106 (0.83%)	147 939 (0.82%)	144 814 (0.81%)	140 998 (0.80%)	?	?	?	?	?	?	?	?	?	?	?
Ukrainians	149 635 (0.83%)	135 796 (0.75%)	121 803 (0.68%)	104 086 (0.58%)	20 818 (0.12%)	?	?	?	?	?	?	?	?	?	?	?
Belgians	137 967 (0.76%)	138 022 (0.76%)	138 037 (0.77%)	137 391 (0.77%)	136 761 (0.78%)	122 197 (0.70%)	121 019 (0.695%)	119 769 (0.69%)	118 725 (0.69%)	117 495 (0.69%)	116 389 (0.69%)	115 687 (0.68%)	?	?	?	?
Chinese	105 240 (0.58%)	103 547 (0.57%)	99 649 (0.56%)	94 980 (0.53%)	91 443 (0.52%)	81 735 (0.47%)		77 648 (0.45%)	74 234 (0.43%)	71 229 (0.42%)	68 697 (0.40%)	66 088 (0.39%)	?	?	?	?
British	104 196 (0.57%)	104 201 (0.58%)	103 530 (0.58%)	102 728 (0.58%)	102 291 (0.58%)	97 614 (0.56%)		91 154 (0.53%)	88 390 (0.51%)	86 293 (0.51%)	84 466 (0.50%)	82 879 (0.49%)	?	?	?	?
Former Yugoslavs (Note: Bosniaks & Bosnians, Croats, Macedonians, Montenegrins, Serbs, Slovenes, and other Yugoslavs collectively)	99 506 (0.55%)	98 933 (0.55%)	98 153 (0.55%)	96 505 (0.54%)	94 298 (0.54%)	91 951		87 536 (0.51%)		85 504 (0.50%)	84 243 (0.50%)	83 261 (0.49%)	?	?	?	?
Indians	99 014 (0.55%)	94 537 (0.52%)	89 276 (0.50%)	80 281 (0.45%)	68 426 (0.39%)	58 460 (0.33%)		48 724 (0.28%)		36 818 (0.22%)	32 682 (0.19%)	?	?	?	?	?
Iraqis	78 337 (0.43%)	75 225 (0.42%)	71 668 (0.40%)	69 607 (0.39%)	67 815 (0.39%)	66 216 (0.38%)		63 008 (0.36%)	61 255 (0.36%)	59 497 (0.35%)	56 269 (0.33%)	?	?	?	?	?
Italians	75 880 (0.42%)	73 825 (0.41%)	71 504 (0.40%)	68 560 (0.38%)	65 446 (0.37%)	61 367 (0.35%)		56 645 (0.33%)	53 703 (0.31%)	50 925 (0.30%)	48 366 (0.28%)	?	?	?	?	?
Romanians (& Roma)	67 385 (0.37%)	63 848 (0.35%)	59 573 (0.33%)	55 310 (0.31%)	48 791 (0.28%)	43 161 (0.25%)	39 340 (0.225%)	34 185 (0.20%)		25 551 (0.15%)	23 020 (0.14%)	?	?	?	?	?
Spaniards	66 413 (0.37%)	64 302 (0.36%)	62 380 (0.35%)	59 755 (0.34%)	56 054 (0.32%)	50 466 (0.29%)		46 741 (0.27%)		42 926 (0.25%)	41 572 (0.24%)	?	?	?	?	?
Iranians (Persians, Azeris and Kurds)	65 721 (0.36%)	62 925 (0.35%)	59 337 (0.33%)	55 718 (0.31%)	52 328 (0.3%)	49 723 (0.29%)		44 379 (0.26%)	42 464 (0.25%)	40 893 (0.24%)	38 458 (0.23%)	?	?	?	?	?
Afghans	65 609 (0.36%)	63 428 (0.35%)	61 473 (0.34%)	59 286 (0.33%)	55 002 (0.31%)	51 830 (0.3%)		49 122 (0.28%)	47 776 (0.28%)	46 701 (0.27%)	44 339 (0.26%)	?	?	?	?	?
Americans	65 257 (0.36%)	62 393 (0.35%)	60 633 (0.34%)	57 943 (0.33%)	55 039 (0.31%)	47 408 (0.27%)		44 399 (0.26%)		40 022 (0.23%)	38 494 (0.23%)	?	?	?	?	?
Bulgarians (& Roma)	63 240 (0.35%)	62 494 (0.35%)	60 999 (0.34%)	56 570 (0.32%)	50 469 (0.29%)	44 874 (0.26%)	40 216 (0.23%)	34 809 (0.20%)		27 729 (0.16%)	25 520 (0.15%)	?	?	?	?	?
French	59 930 (0.33%)	59 181 (0.33%)	58 715 (0.33%)	57 393 (0.32%)	55 408 (0.31%)	50 207 (0.29%)		47 009 (0.27%)	45 558 (0.27%)	43 836 (0.26%)	42 070 (0.25%)	?	?	?	?	?
Russians	52 227 (0.29%)	50 867 (0.28%)	48 792 (0.27%)	43 464 (0.24%)	35 378 (0.20%)	?	?	?	?	?	?	?	?	?	?	?
Brazilians	51 323 (0.28%)	49 210 (0.27%)	46 940 (0.26%)	44 202 (0.25%)	40 804 (0.23%)	35 285 (0.2%)	33 348 (0.19%)	30 104 (0.17%)		24 725 (0.14%)	23 675 (0.14%)	?	?	?	?	?
South Africans (Afrikaners)	51 078 (0.28%)	48 798 (0.27%)	45 649 (0.25%)	41 300 (0.23%)	36 380 (0.21%)	28 562 (0.16%)		23 738 (0.14%)		20 859 (0.12%)	19 877 (0.12%)	?	?	?	?	?
Somalis	49 453 (0.27%)	46 665 (0.26%)	44 042 (0.25%)	42 084 (0.24%)	41 072 (0.23%)	40 701 (0.23%)	40 251 (0.23%)	39 947 (0.23%)	39 737 (0.23%)	39 457 (0.23%)	39 465 (0.23%)	?	?	?	?	?
Greeks	41 889 (0.23%)	40 161 (0.22%)	38 175 (0.21%)	35 758 (0.20%)	32 275 (0.18%)	28 856 (0.16%)	28 100 (0.16%)	25 709 (0.15%)		22 141 (0.13%)	20 769 (0.12%)	?	?	?	?	?
Portuguese	41 273 (0.23%)	39 352 (0.22%)	37 193 (0.21%)	34 401 (0.19%)	31 712 (0.18%)	29 092 (0.17%)	28 802 (0.17%)	27 450 (0.16%)		25 637 (0.15%)	24 930 (0.15%)	?	?	?	?	?
Bosnians	39 997 (0.22%)	39 938 (0.22%)	39 829 (0.22%)	39 666 (0.22%)	39 289 (0.22%)	38 927 (0.22%)	?	?	?	?	?	?	?	?	?	?
Pakistanis	35 623 (0.20%)	33 349 (0.18%)	31 354 (0.17%)	29 314 (0.16%)	27 445 (0.16%)	25 938 (0.15%)		23 855 (0.14%)	22 897 (0.13%)	22 137 (0.13%)	21 447 (0.13%)	?	?	?	?	?
Ethiopians	35 324 (0.19%)	33 727 (0.19%)	32 404 (0.18%)	31 078 (0.17%)	29 896 (0.17%)	27 139 (0.15%)		23 777 (0.14%)		19 528 (0.11%)	16 347 (0.10%)	?	?	?	?	?
Eritreans	34 898 (0.19%)	31 604 (0.18%)	28 842 (0.16%)	26 719 (0.15%)	25 081 (0.14%)	?	?	?	?	?	?	?	?	?	?	
Egyptians	34 880 (0.19%)	33 700 (0.19%)	32 519 (0.18%)	31 129 (0.17%)	29 652 (0.17%)	28 399 (0.16%)		26 152 (0.15%)		23 956 (0.14%)	23 198 (0.14%)	?	?	?	?	?
Arubans	34 407 (0.19%)	34 160 (0.19%)	33 642 (0.19%)	32 884 (0.18%)	31 959 (0.18%)	?	?	?	?	?	?	?	?	?	?	?
Hungarians	34 397 (0.19%)	33 440 (0.19%)	32 171 (0.18%)	30 188 (0.17%)	28 552 (0.16%)	26 853 (0.15%)		24 898 (0.14%)		22 870 (0.13%)	22 080 (0.13%)	?	?	?	?	?
Filipinos	33 128 (0.18%)	31 602 (0.18%)	30 216 (0.17%)	28 594 (0.16%)	27 206 (0.15%)	25 365 (0.14%)		23 128 (0.13%)	22 000 (0.13%)	20 937 (0.12%)	20 073 (0.12%)	?	?	?	?	?
Colombians	32 796 (0.18%)	31 263 (0.17%)	29 788 (0.17%)	28 398 (0.16%)	27 176 (0.15%)	20 515 (0.12%)		18 351 (0.11%)		16 607 (0.10%)	15 892 (0.09%)	?	?	?	?	?
Ghanaians	31 326 (0.17%)	29 990 (0.17%)	28 911 (0.16%)	27 807 (0.16%)	26 908 (0.15%)	25 999 (0.15%)		24 460 (0.14%)		23 430 (0.14%)	23 168 (0.14%)	?	?	?	?	?
Vietnamese (Kinh)	27 936 (0.15%)	27 237 (0.15%)	26 486 (0.15%)	25 849 (0.15%)	25 258 (0.14%)	24 594 (0.14%)		23 488 (0.14%)		22 023 (0.13%)	21 435 (0.13%)	?	?	?	?	?
Thai	26 515 (0.15%)	26 038 (0.14%)	25 609 (0.14%)	25 023 (0.14%)	24 367 (0.14%)	22 642 (0.13%)		21 364 (0.12%)		20 106 (0.12%)	19 513 (0.11%)	?	?	?	?	?
Former Czechoslovakia (Note: Primarily Czechs and Slovaks)	26 466 (0.15%)	25 848 (0.14%)	24 844 (0.14%)	23 837 (0.13%)	22 616 (0.13%)	?	?	?	?	?	?	?	?	?	?	?
Cape Verdeans	23 923 (0.13%)	23 674 (0.13%)	23 512 (0.13%)	23 333 (0.13%)	23 156 (0.13%)	22 980 (0.13%)		22 632 (0.13%)		22 285 (0.13%)	22 157 (0.13%)	?	?	?	?	?
Hongkongers	?	?	?	?	18 363 (0.1%)	18 332 (0.10%)		18 367 (0.11%)		18 357 (0.11%)	18 300 (0.11%)	?	?	?	?	?
Australians	24 309 (0.13%)	24 255 (0.13%)	23 903 (0.13%)	23 272 (0.13%)	22 832 (0.13%)	17 688 (0.10%)		17 349 (0.10%)		16 597 (0.10%)	16 127 (0.09%)	?	?	?	?	?
Canadians	23 025 (0.13%)	22 846 (0.13%)	22 627 (0.13%)	22 122 (0.12%)	21 491 (0.12%)	16 997 (0.10%)		16 614 (0.10%)	16 240 (0.09%)	15 944 (0.09%)	15 625 (0.09%)	?	?	?	?	?
Austrians	?	?	?	?	16 216 (0.09%)	16 130 (0.09%)		16 055 (0.09%)		15 777 (0.09%)	15 674 (0.09%)	?	?	?	?	?
Nigerians	22 463 (0.12%)	21 351 (0.12%)	20 322 (0.11%)	19 381 (0.11%)	16 907 (0.10%)	?	?	?	?	?	?	?	?	?	?	?
Serbs	20 517 (0.11%)	20 297 (0.11%)	20 116 (0.11%)	19 829 (0.11%)	19 384 (0.11%)	?	?	?	?	?	?	?	?	?	?	?
Rest of Sub-Saharan Africa	?	?	?	?	?			108 621 (0.63%)		97 026 (0.57%)	91 797 (0.54%)	?	?	?	?	?
Rest of Europe	?	?	?	?	?			77 245 (0.45%)		68 592 (0.40%)	65 849 (0.39%)	?	?	?	?	?
Rest of Americas (except Caribbean)	?	?	?	?	?			52 425 (0.30)		47 048 (0.28%)	45 256 (0.27%)	?	?	?	?	?
Rest of North Africa and Middle East	?	?	?	?	?			55 180 (0.32%)		46 231 (0.27%)	44 059 (0.26%)	?	?	?	?	?
Rest of East and Southeast Asia	?	?	?	?	?			38 279 (0.22%)		34 562 (0.20%)	33 473 (0.20%)	?	?	?	?	?
Rest of Caribbean	?	?	?	?	?			28 861 (0.17%)		21 514 (0.13%)	20 956 (0.12%)	?	?	?	?	?
Rest of South Asia	?	?	?	?	?			18 672 (0.11%)		17 448 (0.10%)	16 762 (0.10%)	?	?	?	?	?
Rest of Oceania	?	?	?	?	?			6 479 (0.04%)		6 062 (0.04%)	5 916 (0.03%)	?	?	?	?	?
Others	?	?	?	?	?							1 094 826 (6.48%)	1 587 433 (9.43%)	1 437 462 (8.57%)	1 437 462 (8.59%)	1 387 255 (8.37%)
Total	18 130 208	18 044 027	17 942 942	17 811 291	17 590 672	17 475 415	17 407 575	17 282 163	17 181 084	17 081 507	16 979 120	16 900 726	16 829 289	16 779 575	16 730 348	16 577 612

Population pyramids of background groups

Dutch background population pyramid in 2022

Migration background: Total

1st generation migrant background

2nd generation (both parents born abroad) migrant background

2nd generation partial (one parent born abroad) migrant background

Europe (total foreign/non-Dutch) migrant background

Americas (total foreign/non-Dutch) migrant background

Asia (total foreign/non-Dutch) migrant background

Africa (total foreign/non-Dutch) migrant background

Total population pyramid by migration background origin

Region of the World	2024	2023	2022	2021	2019	2018	2017	2016
Netherlands	12 941 748 (72.13%)	12 978 154 (72.86%)	13 013 279 (73.97%)	13 169 507 (75.36%)	13 196 025 (76.36%)	13 209 225 (76.88%)	13 218 754 (77.39%)	13 226 829 (77.90%)
Europe (Except Netherlands)	1 677 093 (9.35%)	1 617 454 (9.08%)	1 477 069 (8.39%)				1 237 807 (7.25%)	1 204 908 (7.10%)
Asia	1 661 731 (9.26%)	1 594 551 (8.95%)	1 523 493 (8.66%)					
Americas	855 488 (4.77%)	804 097 (4.51%)	815,554 (4.63%)					
Africa	806 882 (4.50%)	785 016 (4.41%)	761 277 (4.32%)					
North Africa and Middle East				1 148 300 (6.64%)		1 081 636 (6.33%)	1 033 393 (6.09%)	
East and South East Asia				561 047 (3.25%)		551 542 (3.23%)	548 340 (3.23%)	
Caribbean and Suriname				538 262 (3.11%)		524 961 (3.07%)	520 959 (3.07%)	
Sub-Saharan Africa				243 175 (1.41%)		222 585 (1.30%)	212 811 (1.25%)	
Americas (Except Caribbean and Suriname)				161 893 (0.94%)		144 346 (0.85%)	138 942 (0.82%)	
South Asia				91 251 (0.53%)		76 403 (0.45%)	70 891 (0.42%)	
Oceania		32 019 (0.18%)	24 423 (0.14%)	24 390 (0.14%)	22 828 (0.14%)		22 659 (0.13%)	22 043 (0.13%)

Immigrants and people of migrant backgrounds
Nationality	Population (2026)
Turkey	479,880
Morocco	437,328
Suriname	370,281
Indonesia	347,997
(European Union) Germany	336,693
(European Union) Poland	244,835
Syria	219,427
Curaçao	151,258
Ukraine	149,635
(European Union) Belgium	137,967
China	105,240
United Kingdom	104,196
India	99,014
Iraq	78,337
(European Union) Italy	75,880
(European Union) Romania	67,385
(European Union) Spain	66,413
Iran	65,721
Afghanistan	65,609
United States	65,257
(European Union) Bulgaria	63,240
(European Union) France	59,930
Russia	52,227
Brazil	51,323
South Africa	51,078
Somalia	49,453
(European Union) Greece	41,889
(European Union) Portugal	41,273
Bosnia and Herzegovina	39,997
Pakistan	35,623
Ethiopia	35,324
Eritrea	34,898
Egypt	34,880
Aruba	34,407
(European Union) Hungary	34,397
Philippines	33,128
Colombia	32,796
Ghana	31,326
Vietnam	27,936
Thailand	26,515
Cape Verde	23,923
Australia	24,309
Canada	23,025
Nigeria	22,463
Serbia	20 517

Net immigrants in the Netherlands in 2022
Rank	Country	Number	Percentage
1	Ukraine	82,767	37
2	Syria	16,276	7.2
3	Turkey	12,040	5.4
4	India	10,903	4.9
5	(European Union) Poland	10,025	4.5
6	(European Union) Romania	6,043	2.7
7	(European Union) Bulgaria	5,527	2.5
8	South Africa	4,616	2
9	Afghanistan	3,278	1.7
10	(European Union) Greece	3,270	1.7
	Top 10 total	154,745	69.1
	Other	69,053	30.9
	Total	223,798	100

=== Emigration ===
The Netherlands have seen considerable emigration. In the 1950s and early 1960s, 560,000 people migrated to Canada, Australia, the United States, South Africa and New Zealand, in response to low wage levels and a government programme aiming to reduce the perceived overpopulation. At least 60,000 of these migrants were Indo-European (mixed Dutch–Indonesian) repatriates that moved on, mostly to the United States, or returned to Indonesia after being repatriated to the Netherlands from the former Dutch East Indies during and after the Indonesian Revolution. The official emigration policy combined with a strong economic growth already in the early 1950s led to serious manpower shortages.

In 2005, some 121,000 people migrated from the Netherlands. There is considerable migration towards neighbouring states, Belgium, Germany and the United Kingdom and to the Netherlands Antilles. Furthermore, almost half of the current emigration consists of people returning to their country of birth, including rejected asylum seekers, after the more stringent migration laws were implemented.

=== Education by background ===
According to a 2016 study by Statistics Netherlands, students with a non-western background generally study at a lower level of secondary education. 48 percent of those with a Dutch background were at HAVO or VWO level at third year, compared to 23 percent for Dutch Turks, 28 percent for Dutch Moroccans, 35 percent for Dutch Surinamese and 31 percent for Dutch Antilleans. Some backgrounds fared better: over 40 percent of Dutch Afghans studied at HAVO/VWO level, and for Dutch Iranians the rate was 50 percent, which was above native Dutch students.

== Employment and income ==
Unemployment, youth ages 15–24

total: 7.2%. Country comparison to the world: 130th
male: 7.7%
female: 6.6% (2018 est.)

== Religion ==
In 2025, Statistics Netherlands found that 16% of the population identified as Roman Catholic, 12% as Protestant, 6% as Muslim, and 7% as "other" (the last includes other Christian denominations, Hindus, Jews, and Buddhists). In 2017, the Central Bureau of Statistics reported that for the first time non-religious people were in the majority in the Netherlands, with only 49% of people older than 15 years reported to be religious. The largest religion was Catholicism (24%), while 5% identified with Islam. In 2012 54% reported to be religious.

Religion in Netherlands
1. No religion (58%)
2. Roman Catholic (16%)
3. Protestantism (12%)
4. Muslim (6%)
5. Other religions (7%)

== Language ==
The main language is Dutch, while Frisian (known as West Frisian outside of the Netherlands) is also a recognized language in the province of Friesland and is used by the government and schools there. Several dialects of Low Saxon (Nedersaksisch in Dutch) are spoken in much of the north and east and are recognized by the Netherlands as regional languages according to the European Charter for Regional or Minority Languages. Another group of dialects granted the status of regional language is Limburgish, which is spoken in the south-eastern province of Limburg. The vast majority of the population also speaks English. Major immigrant languages are Indonesian, Turkish, Arabic, Berber, Papiamento, German and Polish.

== See also ==
- Dutch people
- Islam in the Netherlands
- Immigration to Europe
- List of countries by immigrant population
- Indo people
