= Arabs in the Netherlands =

Arabs in the Netherlands Arabieren in Nederland العرب في هولندا
Total population
- Moroccans 414,186 (2021); Syrians 113,126 (2021); Iraqis 66,216 (2021); Egyptians 28,399 (2021); Tunisians 10,940 (2021); Algerians 8,849 (2021); Lebanese 7,950 (2021); Saudis 4,860 (2021); Jordanians 2,719 (2021); Kuwaitis 2,669 (2021)

Regions with significant populations
- Predominantly Randstad; Amsterdam · Rotterdam · The Hague

Languages
- Arabic language Dutch language

Religion
- Mainly Islam and minority Christianity

Related ethnic groups
- Arabs, Arab diaspora

Arabs in the Netherlands (Dutch: Arabieren in Nederland; Arabic: العرب في هولندا), also Arab Dutch (Arabische Nederlanders) or Dutch Arabs (Nederlandse Arabieren), are citizens or residents of the Netherlands whose ancestry traces back to the Arab world.

== History ==
=== Activism ===
On 8 September 2001, two Arab immigrants to the Netherlands, Egyptian-born film maker Ibrahim Farouk and Moroccan-born writer Mustafa Aboustib, launched a political party to protest what they perceived as poor representation of Arab Dutch people in mainstream political parties, except as "pretty Arab faces".

The Arab European League, a controversial pan-Arabist movement founded in Belgium by Lebanese-born Dyab Abou Jahjah, was active in the Netherlands between March 2003 and December 2010. It was represented by Nabil Marmouch and Abdoulmouthalib Bouzerda, both Moroccan Dutch born in The Hague and Arnhem, respectively.

In November 2007, Iraqi-born journalist Mohammad Mousa led a group of Dutch Arabs in protest against the private-media conglomerate Al Jazeera's effective monopoly on Arabic-language broadcasting in the country.

== Notable individuals ==
=== Arts and literature ===
- Rodaan Al Galidi (born 1971), writer
- Ramsey Nasr (born 1974), writer
- Laïla Abid (born 1977), journalist

=== Cinema and television ===
- Hany Abu-Assad (born 1961), film director
- Youssef Idilbi (1976–2008), actor
- Mohamed Al-Daradji (born 1978), film director
- Marwan Kenzari (born 1983), actor
- Maryam Hassouni (born 1985), actress
- Imaan Hammam (born 1996), fashion model

=== Music ===
- Ramses Shaffy (1933–2009), singer
- Ali B (born 1981), rapper
- Rania Zeriri (born 1986), singer
- R3hab (born 1986), DJ and electronic musician
- Yes-R (born 1986), rapper

=== Politics ===
- Khadija Arib (born 1960), politician
- Arjan El Fassed (born 1973), politician

=== Sports ===
- Tahseen Jabbary (born 1964), football coach
- Karim Bridji (born 1981), football player
- Saïd Boutahar (born 1982), football player
- Amir Zeyada (born 1984), kickboxer
- Mounir El Hamdaoui (born 1984), football player
- Mourad Bouzidi (born 1984), kickboxer
- Badr Hari (born 1984), kickboxer
- Ibrahim Afellay (born 1986), football player
- Fouad Idabdelhay (born 1988), football player
- Ismaïl Aissati (born 1988), football player
- Mimoun Eloisghiri (born 1989), football player
- Anouar Kali (born 1991), football player
- Osama Rashid (born 1992), football player
- Hilal Ben Moussa (born 1992), football player
- Mohamed Hamdaoui (born 1993), football player
- Anass Achahbar (born 1994), football player
- Karim Rekik (born 1994), football player
- Anwar El Ghazi (born 1995), football player
- Redouan El Yaakoubi (born 1996), football player
- Zakaria Aboukhlal (born 2000), football player
- Abdallah Aberkane (born 2000), football player
- Anouar El Azzouzi (born 2001), football player
- Yassine Azzagari (born 2001), football player
- Marouan Azarkan (born 2001), football player
- Naoufal Bannis (born 2002), football player
- Younes Taha (born 2002), football player
- Mohamed Nassoh (born 2003), football player
- Anis Yadir (born 2004), football player

== See also ==
- Arab diaspora
- Arabs in Europe
- Egyptians in the Netherlands
- Iraqis in the Netherlands
- List of Dutch people of Lebanese descent
- Moroccans in the Netherlands
- Algerian diaspora
- Syrian diaspora
- Tunisian diaspora
