= Wesam al-Delaema =

Wesam al-Delaema, also known as Wesam Khalaf Chayed Delaeme, (born in Fallujah, Iraq, 15 February 1973), is an Iraqi-born Dutch citizen accused by the United States Department of Justice of conspiring to kill American soldiers in Iraq.

Wesam al Delaema first came to Europe in 1993 and applied for asylum in Greece. This was refused and he was expelled. Later in the same year, he applied for asylum in the Netherlands, not revealing his earlier attempt in Greece. Granted Dutch citizenship in 2001, he was working as a hair dresser. Wesam al-Delaema took part in an anti-American rally in Amsterdam where he burned his hand trying to set fire to a flag.

His claim to be a political refugee did not keep him from travelling back to Iraq several times, and marrying his first cousin Zina. During a 2003 trip, supposedly for a wedding, he made a movie called Warriors of Fallujah. This film showed an insurgency group planting bombs boasting of planning on killing American soldiers. In the movie, al Delaema is seen handling a road-side bomb and assisting digging it in. Later, in his defense, Wesam al Delaema would say the movie was 'a journalistic portrait'.

In May 2005, Dutch police raided his house in Amersfoort. Prosecution was started but stopped when the USA asked for his extradition for conspiracy to use explosives against American soldiers. On October 16, 2006 the court decided he could be extradited. Wesam al Delaema appealed and the appellate court confirmed the district courts decision for extradition on December 19, 2006. Al Delaema was transferred to the USA on January 28, 2007. He was arraigned on January 29, 2007. Al Delaema pleaded guilty in Federal Court in Washington D.C. on February 26, 2009 and was sentenced to 25 years imprisonment. Additionally, while al-Delaema was incarcerated in the DC jail, he participated in the beating of a prison guard, kicking the guard until he was unconscious. Al-Delaema also pleaded guilty to this additional charge and received a separate prison sentence.

Part of the extradition agreement was that al-Delaema would serve his sentence in the Netherlands and that his sentence would be adapted to Dutch standards.

During his prosecution, friends of him have stated that Wesam al Delaema was well adapted to Dutch society, even taking part in a game show. A family friend, Khaten, however had stated that Delaema had joined the Mujehadin in Iraq

In 2010 he was transferred to the Netherlands, where the prosecutors office asked his sentence to be adapted to 16 years. On October 13, 2010 the court in Rotterdam however gave him a sentence of 8 years, citing the bad circumstances of his imprisonment in the USA. As al Delaema already had spent 5,5 years in jail, and the Dutch legal system has an automatic release after 2/3 of the sentence, al Deleama could walk out of the court a free man. Dutch Newspaper 'De Telegraaf' published a picture of al Delaema leaving the court house, laughing and joking with his friends.

His release has caused a stir in the United States. Justice department spokes woman Laura Sweeney said the conditions under which al Delaema was held 'were identical to those of other prisoners' and that in no way could these justify reduction of his sentence.
