= Egyptians in the Netherlands =

Egyptians in the Netherlands Egyptenaren in Nederland مصريون في هولندا
Total population
- 27,504

Languages
- Arabic (Egyptian Arabic) · Coptic · Dutch

Religion
- Predominantly Islam (Sunni), minority Coptic Christianity

Related ethnic groups
- Egyptian diaspora

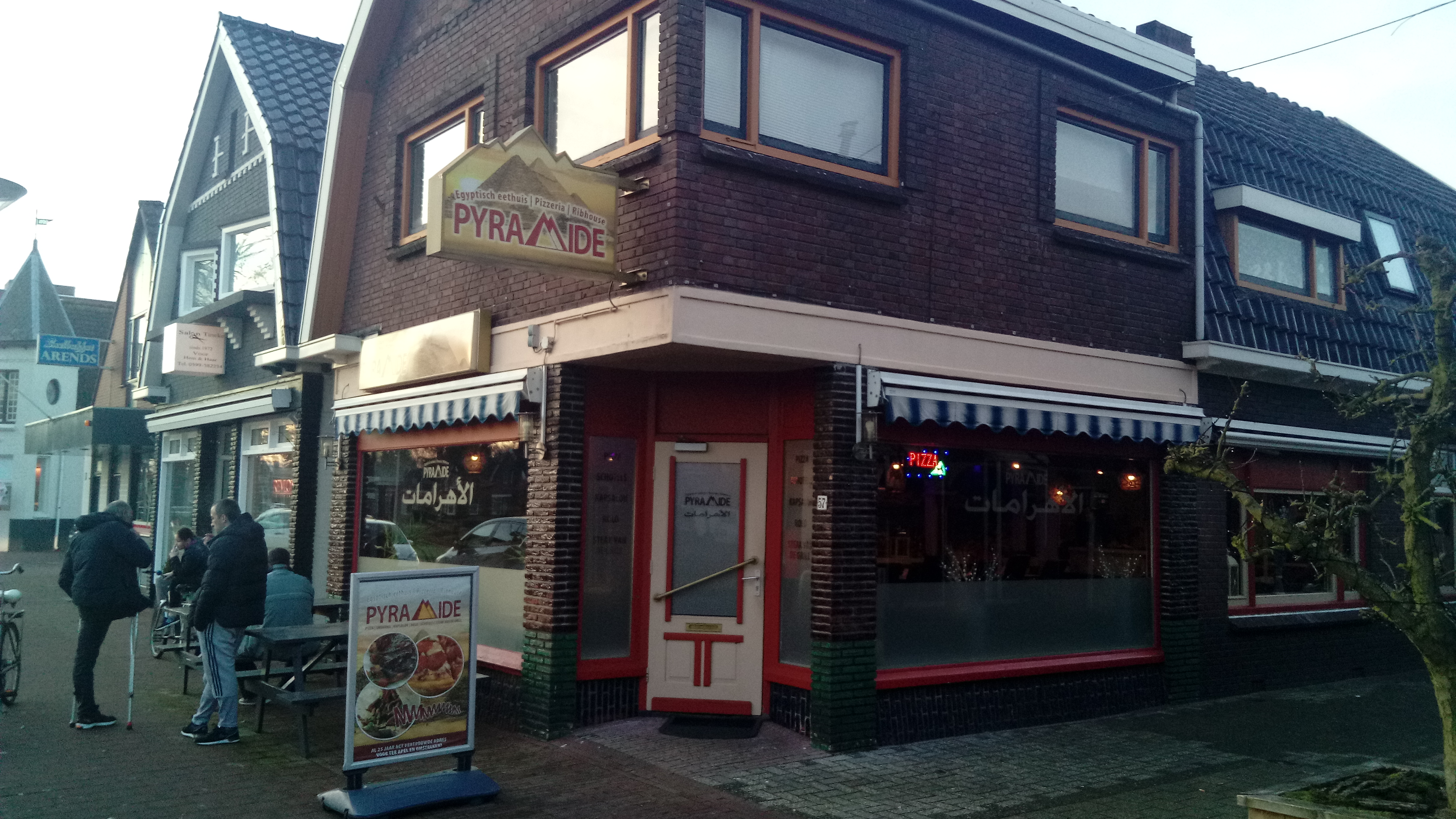

Egyptians in the Netherlands (Dutch: Egyptenaren in Nederland; Arabic: مصريون في هولندا, romanized: Miṣrīyūn fī Hūlandā) are residents or citizens of the Netherlands who are of Egyptian ancestry. The community is relatively small, numbering 27,504 individuals.

== Notable Egyptians in the Netherlands ==
- Nasr Abu Zayd, thinker and liberal theologian
- Laura Fygi, singer
- Imaan Hammam, model
- Rami Ismail, video game developer
- Josylvio, rapper
- Ramses Shaffy, singer
- Yes-R, rapper
- Amir Zeyada, kickboxer

== See also ==
- Egypt–Netherlands relations
- Arabs in Europe
- Arabs in the Netherlands
- Moroccans in the Netherlands
- Iraqis in the Netherlands
- Islam in the Netherlands
- Berbers in the Netherlands
