= Ageing of the Netherlands =

The Netherlands population pyramid from 1950–2020

The population of the Netherlands is getting increasingly older, due to longer life expectancy and a sub-replacement fertility rate. In Dutch this phenomenon is called Vergrijzing (English: Greying). As of 1 January 2023 around 20% of the Dutch population is aged 65 or older. It is predicted that this will increase to 24% in 2035 with some areas facing more severe ageing than others, especially rural municipalities in the east of the country. It is expected that the following decades this percentage will continue to increase. The cause of the ageing population of the Netherlands can be traced back to the 1970s when the fertility rate started to rapidly drop.

== History ==
After the Second World War the fertility rate of the Netherlands was for twenty consecutive years higher than 3.0, with the baby boom as an outlier between 1945 and 1954. Starting in 1969 the fertility rate started to decline rapidly; in 1973 it reached 2.1 and in 1976 it stabilized at around 1.5 to 1.6.

In 1900 around 6% of the Dutch population was aged 65 or older and fifty years later, in 1950, this percentage was less than 8%. In 1975 this had increased to 11%. In 2024 those aged 65 or older were estimated to be 20.5% of the Dutch population.

== Implications ==
=== Economy ===
The number of workers that are aged 55 or older has increased since the early 2000s. In 2020 3.3% of the workers in the Netherlands was aged 65 or older. How employers look at older workers differs; most employers that already employ older workers look more positively to older workers than those that do not employ older workers. Some noted issues with older workers are that they may be less able to cope with work pressure and employing them will result in an increase in wage costs for companies. The ageing of the Dutch population will also lead to a shrinking work force and more demand for workers.

=== Public finances ===
The ageing of the Dutch population will also impact the public finances since it will lead to more government spending to deal with age related issues, while the number of people contributing to public finances will decrease as a result of a shrinking work force. One of the areas this will put pressure on are social services because ageing will lead to more demand and rising costs.

=== Society ===
The increasing number of older people will lead to more demand for care, both informal and professional care.

=== Military ===
As a result of ageing more military personnel are leaving the Dutch Armed Forces, while at the same time the number of new recruits is fewer than those leaving. To counter this the Ministry of Defence has started new initiatives and recruitment campaigns to raise awareness of the importance of the armed forces among the youths and make them consider pursuing a career in the Dutch armed forces.

=== Government policies ===
The Dutch government has taken several policy measures to deal with the ageing of the population. One of these measures is raising the age of retirement.
