= Iraqis in the Netherlands =

Iraqis in the Netherlands Irakezen in Nederland العراقيون في هولندا
Total population
- 55,000 - 60,000 0.3% of the Dutch population

Regions with significant populations
- Amsterdam, The Hague, Almelo, Arnhem, Enschede

Languages
- Dutch and Iraqi Arabic, also Kurdish (Sorani and Kurmanji dialects), Turkish (Iraqi Turkmen/Turkoman dialects), and Neo-Aramaic (Assyrian and Mandaic)

Religion
- Predominantly Islam and Christianity (Syriac Christianity and Catholic); Mandaeism.

Related ethnic groups
- Arabs, Armenians, Assyrians, Azeris, Iranians, Mizrahim, Turks, Mandaeans, Some descendants Dutch

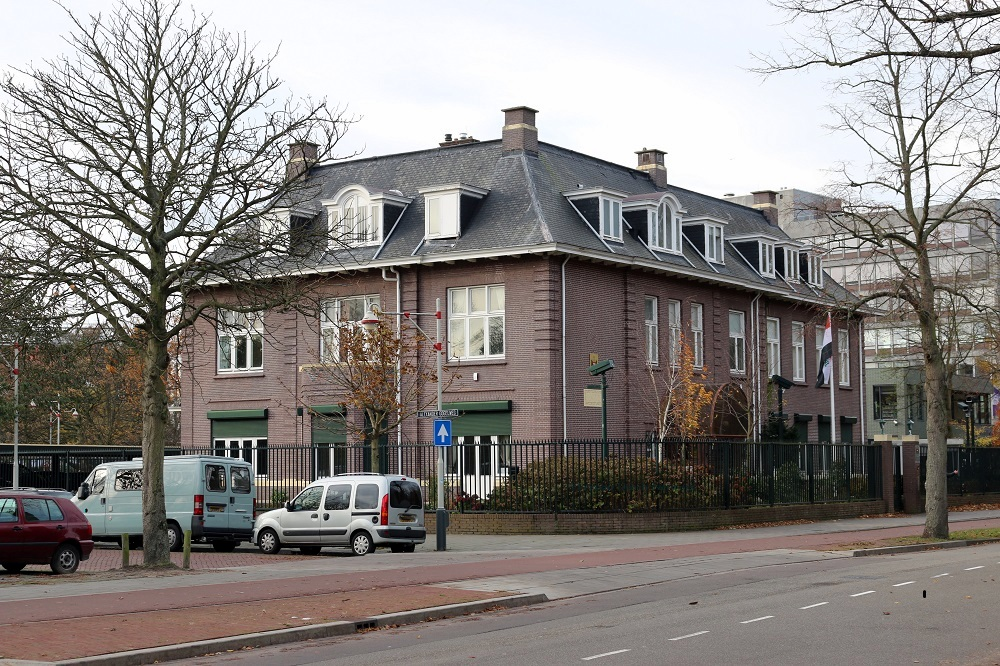
Iraqi Embassy in the Netherlands

There are over 50,000 Iraqis in the Netherlands (Dutch: Irakezen in Nederland; Arabic: العراقيون في هولندا, romanized: al-ʻIrāqīyūn fī Hūlandā), including immigrants from Iraq and locally born people of Iraqi heritage, constiting 0.3% of the total population in the Netherlands. Some sources claim an estimation of 60,000 people of Iraqi descent living in the Netherlands. The Iraqi community in the Netherlands is the 4th largest and has the highest percentage of qualified and professional people and artistes who have integrated well and have become useful members of the Dutch society.

== Migration history ==
The first wave of immigrants was in 1992, the data confirm duo this phenomenon, which rose gradually to reach a peak in 1998. 19.5 per cent of the interviewees from study report came in that year. While 13.5 per cent in 1999. However, numbers have decreased in 2003 and 2004, which was 1 per cent, and in 1992, the proportion was 2 per cent.

The Iraqi community in the Netherlands has increased from 8,000 in 1995 to approximately 40,000 in 2002. Apart from this group, there is an unknown number of Iraqis illegally staying in the Netherlands.

The main motives of the Iraqi migration are political asylum seeking resulting from previous conditions in Iraq regarding the nature of the former regime, and the circumstances of successive wars and the economic embargo which was imposed on Iraq.

== Demography ==
A recent study report, shows that two-thirds of the Iraqi community in the Netherlands are young and well qualified to work in the various fields of life. However, many of which are unemployed despite being well educated. The level of integration of the Iraqi community with the Dutch people is noticeably low. It amounts to a quarter out of the standards of social integration. The level of mastery of the Dutch language and of the participation in the social and political activities is quite low. The commitment to the mother culture with its Islamic, Arab and Iraqi references is quite high. Judging by gender of the Iraqi population, it has been assessed that 60 per cent are males and females account for 40 per cent.

Most of the Iraqi community are younger age groups and qualify for the labor market, the age categories are between 26-35 and 36–45 years, they were 28 per cent for each category. This reflects the new age of the Iraqi community in the Netherlands, which also means that most members of this community are first generation.

With regard to the marital status, the largest proportion of whom are married is at 58 per cent, this figure represents 53 per cent males and 68 per cent females. Due to a lot of Iraqi women coming to the Netherlands because of family reunification, whether married already or later. The group of unmarried Iraqis was accounted for 25 per cent.

There is a good proportion of inter-marriage between members of the Iraqi community in the Netherlands and Dutch or others. The proportion is 12.5 per cent with Dutch people, that was among 13 cases of Iraqi men with Dutch women and 4 cases of Iraqi women married to Dutch men. The rest refers to some cases with foreigners. While the highest rate of marriage represents 81 per cent of the same country (Iraq).

There is a high level of friendship relations between Iraqi immigrants and the Dutch people. There is no divergence for Iraqis in accordance with their religious background of both Muslims and Christians to build a friendship with the Dutch. Where equal ratio between them is 70 per cent for each part. While the proportion of the non-believers is 100 per cent, which reflects the overcome on some reservations expressed by some immigrants from religious background.

Population centers (2013)
city	population	city ratio
Amsterdam	2,800	
The Hague	2,800	
Rotterdam	2,100	
Almere	1,800	
Almelo	1,700	2.3%
Arnhem	1,300	1%
Utrecht	1,200	
Enschede	1,200	
Delft	1,100	1.1%
Groningen	800	
Eindhoven	700	
Zwolle	700	
Nijmegen	700	
Hengelo	600	

== Education ==
The rate of education to the Iraqi community, whether men or women is high and over that with Moroccans, Surinamese and comparing with the Dutch people too. According to the study, the total holding higher degrees (High Institute, Bachelor's, Master's and Ph.D.) are 54 per cent. While the rest carry secondary school and below certificates. However, there was a low proportion of Iraqis who obtained diplomas and certificates from the Netherlands. The proportion is 21 per cent for various academic levels. But the percentage is higher for a secondary certificate, it is not a high level compared with other graduates from Iraq who made up 69 per cent. That means that most holders of these certificates are younger ages in the community study, or second generation.

== Employment ==
There is a high rate of the unemployment among Iraqi immigrants, 40 per cent of whom are unemployed, compared with only 13 per cent who officially work and 12 per cent free work. Unemployment is also concentrated among people who are higher educated, especially university graduates, while lower percentage is among other educational levels.

== Language ==
There is a low percentage of Iraqis who use the Dutch language in their homes through their dealings with their children and parents. The proportion was only 17.5 per cent. Meanwhile, there is 47.5 per cent who do not use it at all. According to results of the study, the majority of interviewees (62 per cent) have impression that the Dutch language is (difficult). Compared with 30 per cent of them who felt that it is (reasonable to learn). While only 7 per cent said it is (easy).

== Notable people ==
- Hashim Mohammed Gafer, Iraqi Politician and member of Iraqi COR
- Salah Abdel-Razzaq, Governor of Baghdad
- Mohamed Al-Daradji, film director
- Haidar al Ibrahim, politician
- Mahmoud Jasim Al-najar, author/poet
- Samir Bashara, politician
- Wesam al-Delaema, accused by the US of conspiring to kill Americans in Iraq.
- Farida Mohammad Ali, singer
- Hagal Amin, film director
- Dashni Murad, singer of Kurdish origin
- Essam Zaki, fashion designer
- Nedim Kufi, artist
- Viola Haqi, fashion model
- Ciawar Khandan, footballer
- Osama Rashid, footballer
- Anmar Almubaraki, footballer
- Hawbir Mostafa, footballer
- Qassim Alsaedy, artist
- Laila Al-Zwaini, author
- Rodaan Al Galidi, writer
- Mariwan Kanie, writer
- Rafid al-Sabti, Mandaean priest
- Hind Dekker-Abdulaziz, politician

== See also ==
- Demographics of the Netherlands
- Arabs in the Netherlands
- Turks in the Netherlands
