= Egyptian diaspora =

Total population
- 14 million

Regions with significant populations
- Saudi Arabia: 1,471,382 (2022 census)
- United Arab Emirates: 750,000
- Kuwait: 644,000
- Jordan: 1,150,000
- Sudan: 500,000
- United States: 279,672
- Qatar: 230,000
- Italy: 140,322
- Canada: 105,245
- Israel: 60,000
- Oman: 56,000
- Lebanon: 40,000
- South Africa: 40,000
- United Kingdom: 39,000
- Australia: 36,532-340,000
- Austria: 33,000
- Germany: 29,600
- Netherlands: 27,504
- Turkey: 25,800
- Greece: 25,000
- France: 15,000
- Argentina: 19,000

Languages
- Egyptian Arabic; Sa'idi Arabic; English and many others

Religion
- Islam; Christianity; Judaism

The Egyptian diaspora consists of citizens of Egypt abroad sharing a common culture and Egyptian Arabic dialects. The phenomenon of Egyptians emigrating from Egypt was rare until Anwar El Sadat came to power and a law was instated in 1971 to authorize emigration and settlement abroad. Before then, Cleland's 1936 declaration remained valid, that "Egyptians have the reputation of preferring their own soil. Few ever leave except to study or travel; and they always return... Egyptians do not emigrate".

Under Nasser, thousands of Egyptian professionals were dispatched across Africa and North America under Egypt's secondment policy, aiming to support host countries' development but to also support the Egyptian regime's foreign policy aims. At the same time, Egypt also experienced an outflow of Egyptian Jews, and large numbers of Egyptian Copts.

After Nasser's death, Egypt liberalized its emigration policy, which led to millions of Egyptians pursuing employment opportunities abroad, both in Western countries, as well as across the Arab world. In the 1980s, many emigrated mainly to Iraq and Kuwait; this happened under different circumstances but mainly for economic reasons. A sizable Egyptian diaspora did not begin to form until well into the 1980s. In 2011, Egyptian diaspora communities around the world mobilized extensively in the context of the Egyptian revolution.

== Trends ==
At the end of 2016, the Central Agency for Public Mobilization and Statistics stated that there are 9.47 million Egyptian expatriates, where 6.23 million Egyptians live in the Arab world, 1.58 million in the Americas, 1.24 million in Europe, 340,000 in Australia and 46,000 in Africa (mostly in South Africa).

Previously, according to studies conducted by the International Organization for Migration, migration is an important phenomenon for the development of Egypt. An estimated 4.7 million (2010) Egyptians abroad contribute actively to the development of their country through remittances (US$7.8 billion in 2009), circulation of human and social capital, as well as investment. In 2006, approximately 70% of Egyptian migrants lived in Arab countries, 950,000 in Libya, 636,000 in Jordan, 300,000 in Kuwait and 160,000 in UAE; also Qatar lists 180,000 Egyptian residents. The remaining 30% are living mostly in Europe and North America (635,000 - 1,000,000) in the United States, and (141,000 - 400,000) in Canada. Europe totals 510,000, with almost half of them (210,000) living in Italy. There is also a large Egyptian population of around 120,000 in Australia.

Generally, those who emigrate to the United States and western European countries tend to do so permanently, while Egyptians migrating to Arab countries go there with the intention of returning to Egypt and have been categorized at least partially as "temporary workers". The number of "temporary workers" was given in the 2001 census as 332,000 in Libya, 226,000 in Jordan, 190,000 in Kuwait, 95,000 in UAE and smaller numbers in other Arab countries

Prior to the 1970s, few Egyptians left the country in search for employment and most doing so were highly skilled professionals working in the Arab world. After a law in 1971 authorized emigration and settlement abroad, and until the 1980s, the Arab states of the Persian Gulf and Libya saw an important immigration of low-skilled Egyptian workers. From the end of the 1980s until today, emigration to Arab countries decreased, although an important Egyptian population kept living there, and new emigrants started to choose Europe as a destination, often travelling by irregular means.

== Challenges ==
Egyptians in neighbouring countries face additional challenges. Over the years, abuse, exploitation and/or ill-treatment of Egyptian workers and professionals in the Arab states of the Persian Gulf, Iraq and Libya have been reported by the Egyptian Human Rights Organization and different media outlets. Arab nationals have in the past expressed fear over an "'Egyptianization' of the local dialects and culture that were believed to have resulted from the predominance of Egyptians in the field of education" (see also Egyptian Arabic - Geographics).

A study by the International Organization for Migration on Egyptian diaspora in the United States, the United Kingdom and Kuwait found that 69% of Egyptians abroad interviewed visit Egypt at least once a year; more than 80% of them are informed about the current affairs in Egypt and approximately a quarter participate in some sort of Egyptian, Arabic, Islamic or Coptic organizations. The same study found that the major concerns of the Egyptian diaspora involved access to consular services for 51% of respondents, assimilation of second generation into the host country's culture (46%), need for more cultural cooperation with Egypt (24%), inability to vote abroad (20%) and military service obligations (6%).

The Egyptians for their part object to what they call the "Saudization" of their culture due to Saudi Arabian petrodollar-flush investment in the Egyptian entertainment industry. Twice Libya was on the brink of war with Egypt due to mistreatment of Egyptian workers and after the signing of the peace treaty with Israel. When the Gulf War ended, Egyptian workers in Iraq were subjected to harsh measures and expulsion by the Iraqi government and to violent attacks by Iraqis returning from the war to fill the workforce.

In 2025, the Egyptian Government called for more support from European nations in tackling migration issues. The call followed a loss of funding from USAID under the Trump administration.
