= Egyptian Arabs in Israel =

Egyptians in Israel
Total population
- 6,000

Languages
- Egyptian Arabic, Hebrew

Religion
- Islam, minority Coptic Christianity

Related ethnic groups
- Egyptian Jews, Israeli Arabs

Egyptians Arabs in Israel are people of Egyptian origin living within Israel's borders. They include those who immigrated for work, resided permanently, or acquired Israeli citizenship, often through marriage to Israeli citizens. The history of this community reflects the complexities of Egyptian-Israeli relations, which evolved from a state of war to a cold peace following the signing of the 1979 peace treaty. Although this community is small compared to other immigrant groups in Israel, its presence sheds light on the dynamics of migration, identity, and integration within a complex political and social context.

== History ==
The presence of Egyptian Arabs in Israel began to be significant in the late 1960s, when some Egyptians traveled to Israel in search of job opportunities. During this period, relations between the two countries were strained due to the Arab-Israeli wars, especially the Yom Kippur War. After the signing of a peace treaty in 1979, Egyptians were able to visit Israel, opening the door to limited movement of individuals. Some of these workers settled in Israel after marrying Israeli women, whether Jewish or Israeli Arabs (known as "Arabs of 1948"). They formed the nucleus of the permanent Egyptian community.

Over time, tourism and trade relations between the two countries led to increased contact. Egyptians who worked in the tourism sector, such as hotels in the Sinai, met Israelis, and in some cases, married and moved to Israel. However, this migration remained limited due to Egyptian government restrictions and negative social perceptions of relations with Israel.

There are no accurate statistics on the number of Egyptians in Israel due to the lack of comprehensive official documentation and the sensitivity of the issue. In a previous statement, Egyptian minister of foreign affairs Sameh Shoukry stated that their number could reach approximately 25,000 and that the majority of Egyptians live in Arab villages and towns within Israel, such as Nazareth and Tayibeh, where they integrate into Israeli Arab society. This integration reflects the cultural and linguistic similarities between them and Palestinians who hold Israeli citizenship.

== Status ==
Egyptian Arabs living in Israel face significant challenges in relations with their home nation. Under Egypt's nationality law, Egyptians who acquire a foreign nationality need state permission to retain their Egyptian nationality. The Egyptian cabinet used that authority in 2023 to withdraw citizenship from three Egyptian citizens holding Israeli citizenship for obtaining foreign citizenship without authorization. Additionally, Egyptian media, society, and government have all vilified Egyptian Arabs living in Israel as traitors to Egypt and as a fifth column which Israel could use against Egypt in a future conflict.

Egyptians arriving in Israel are given six months of temporary residence but are not permitted to work. After the six months, they are given temporary identification card which needs to be renewed every year. In Israel, they have all the rights as Israeli citizens except that they cannot vote in national elections. After five years of temporary residence, they become permanent residents and can apply to become Israeli citizens, though few choose to do this.

In 2017, the Israeli government approved the creation of a nonprofit organization to help Egyptian Israelis called the Egyptian Community in Israel.

== See also ==
- Egypt–Israel relations
- Egyptian diaspora
- Immigration to Israel
- History of the Jews in Egypt
