= Kian Fitz-Jim =

Dutch footballer (born 2003)

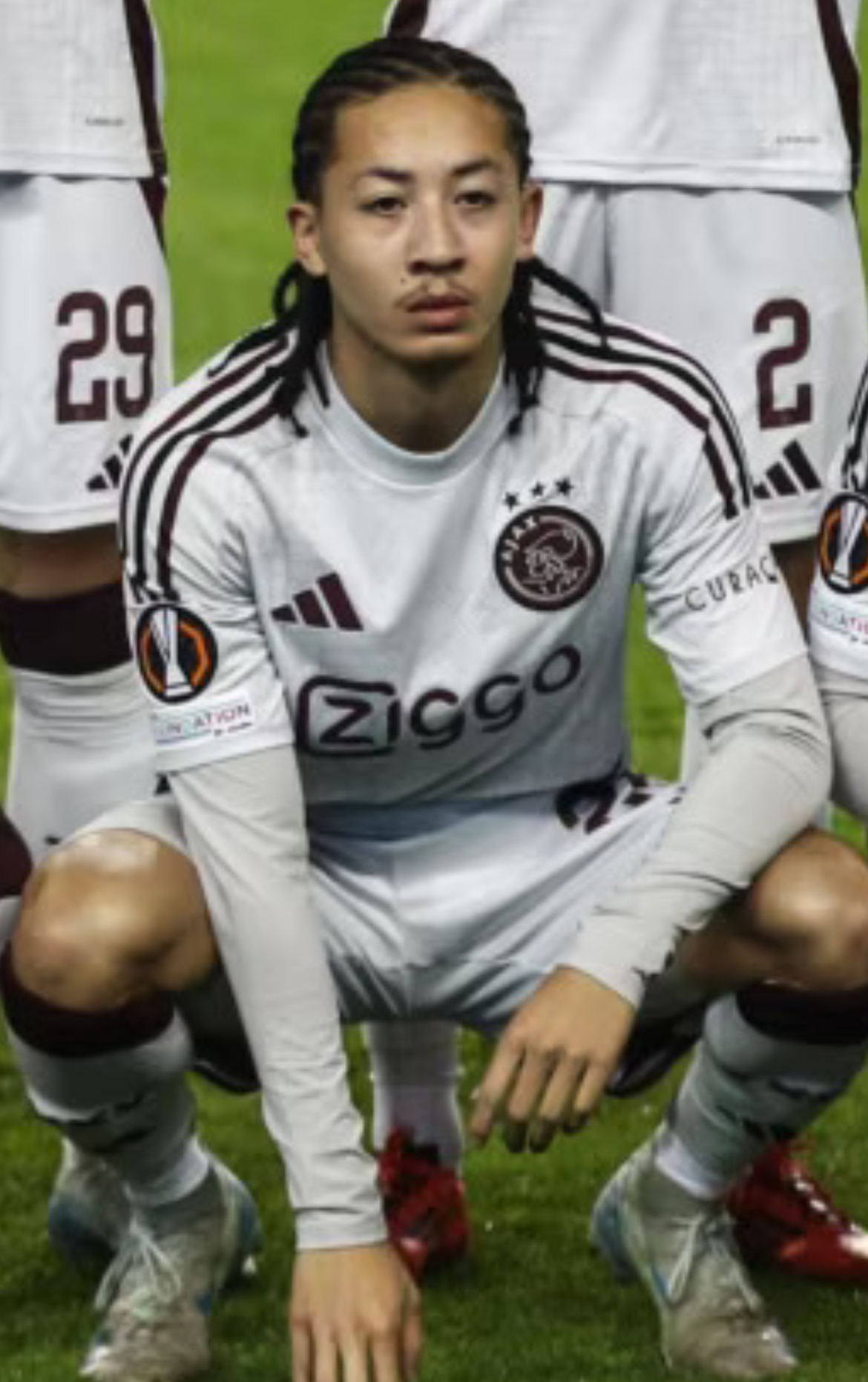
- Fitz-Jim with Ajax in 2024

Personal information
- Full name: Kian Franklin Fitz-Jim
- Date of birth: 5 July 2003 (age 23)
- Place of birth: Amsterdam, Netherlands
- Height: 1.74 m (5 ft 9 in)
- Position: Central midfielder

Team information
- Current team: Torino
- Number: 28

Youth career
- 2011–2013: Buitenveldert
- 2013–2015: AFC
- 2015–2019: AZ Alkmaar
- 2019–2020: Ajax

Senior career*
Years	Team	Apps	(Gls)
2020–2024	Jong Ajax	102	(5)
2023–2026	Ajax	48	(3)
2023–2024	→ Excelsior (loan)	13	(1)
2026–	Torino	7	(1)

International career^{‡}
2017–2018	Netherlands U15	5	(1)
2018–2019	Netherlands U16	2	(0)
2019	Netherlands U17	4	(0)
2021	Netherlands U19	6	(0)
2023	Netherlands U20	1	(0)
2024–2025	Netherlands U21	4	(1)
- * Club domestic league appearances and goals as of 21:20, 23 October 2026 (UTC) ‡ National team caps and goals as of 25 March 2025

Kian Franklin Fitz-Jim (born 5 July 2003) is a Dutch professional footballer who plays as a central midfielder for Serie A club Torino.

== Club career ==
=== Ajax ===
After developing in the youth academies of Buitenveldert, AFC, and AZ Alkmaar, Fitz-Jim signed with Ajax on 18 June 2019. He made his professional debut with the reserve team, Jong Ajax, in the Eerste Divisie on 21 December 2020, appearing as a substitute in a 2–1 loss to SC Telstar. Over the next few seasons, Fitz-Jim became a key player and regular starter for Jong Ajax, eventually making over 100 appearances for the team in the Eerste Divisie. He made his unofficial senior team debut in a friendly against FC Utrecht on 24 March 2021.

Fitz-Jim made his competitive debut for Ajax's first team under manager Alfred Schreuder on 8 January 2023, coming on as a substitute in a 1–1 Eredivisie draw away to NEC. He made three further appearances during the 2022–23 season, two coming in the KNVB Cup.

On 30 August 2023, Fitz-Jim extended his contract with Ajax until June 2027 and was immediately sent on a season-long loan to fellow Eredivisie side Excelsior. He scored his first Eredivisie goal while at Excelsior, making 13 league appearances and 15 total appearances for the club during the first half of the season. However, on 11 January 2024, Ajax recalled Fitz-Jim, terminating the loan spell early. He featured primarily for Jong Ajax after his return for the remainder of the 2023–24 season.

The 2024–25 season marked Fitz-Jim's breakthrough into the Ajax first team under manager Francesco Farioli. He became a regular member of the midfield rotation, making 27 Eredivisie appearances as both a starter and substitute. He scored his first competitive goals for Ajax during this campaign, netting twice in domestic league play. He also made significant contributions in the UEFA Europa League, scoring four goals in 15 appearances across the qualifying rounds and league phase, including strikes against Beşiktaş and Galatasaray. His goal against Galatasaray was voted Ajax's Goal of the Month for January 2025.

Fitz-Jim continued as a member of the senior squad during the 2025–26 season, participating in both domestic action and five appearances in the UEFA Champions League. In total, he made 72 official first-team appearances across all competitions during his tenure at Ajax.

=== Torino ===
On 31 July 2026, Fitz-Jim signed for Serie A club Torino on a permanent transfer from Ajax.

== International career ==
Fitz-Jim is a youth international for the Netherlands. He is also eligible to represent Hong Kong and Suriname through his parents. In 2023, then-Hong Kong national team manager Jørn Andersen expressed interest in selecting him to represent Hong Kong.

== Personal life ==
Fitz-Jim was born in the Netherlands. His father, also born in the Netherlands, is of Surinamese and Chinese descent. His mother is a Hongkonger who emigrated to the Netherlands in childhood. Fitz-Jim holds a Hong Kong identity card and speaks Cantonese.

== Career statistics ==
=== Club ===
As of match played 23 October 2026

Appearances and goals by club, season and competition
Club	Season	League			National cup (Note: Includes KNVB Cup, Coppa Italia)		Europe		Other		Total	
Club	Season	Division	Apps	Goals	Apps	Goals	Apps	Goals	Apps	Goals	Apps	Goals
Jong Ajax	2020–21	Eerste Divisie	21	1	—		—		—		21	1
Jong Ajax	2021–22	Eerste Divisie	34	0	—		—		—		34	0
Jong Ajax	2022–23	Eerste Divisie	30	3	—		—		—		30	3
Jong Ajax	2023–24	Eerste Divisie	17	1	—		—		—		17	1
Jong Ajax	Total		102	5	—		—		—		102	5
Excelsior (loan)	2023–24	Eredivisie	13	1	2	0	—		—		15	1
Ajax	2022–23	Eredivisie	2	0	2	0	0	0	0	0	4	0
Ajax	2023–24	Eredivisie	2	0	0	0	0	0	0	0	2	0
Ajax	2024–25	Eredivisie	27	2	2	0	15 (Note: Appearances in UEFA Europa League)	4	—		44	6
Ajax	2025–26	Eredivisie	17	1	0	0	5 (Note: Appearances in UEFA Champions League)	0	—		22	1
Ajax	Total		48	3	4	0	20	4	0	0	72	7
Torino	2026–27	Serie A	6	1	1	0	—		—		7	1
Career total			169	10	7	0	20	4	0	0	196	14
