= Romani people in the Netherlands =

Romani people in the Netherlands (Dutch: Roma in Nederland) are Romani people who live in the Netherlands; part of the broader Romani diaspora. Though they represent a small portion of the national population, the plight of those in the Roma community has received ongoing national attention.

== History ==
At the outbreak of World War II it is estimated that a number of Roma families lived in the Netherlands, forming community with a larger group of Sinti travelers and approximately 11,000 native Dutch caravan-dwellers. In 1944, toward the end of the war, Nazis in occupied Netherlands arrested 578 caravan dwellers and identified 245 as Sinti. All 245 were sent to the Auschwitz concentration camp and only 30 survived.

In 2021, King Willem-Alexander unveiled a memorial to Roma, Sinti, and Jewish victims of the Holocaust in the Netherlands.

== See also ==
- Romani diaspora
