= Hongkongers in the Netherlands =

Ethnic group

Hongkongers in the Netherlands Hongkongers in Nederland
- (Hong Kong) (Netherlands)

Total population
- 9,757 (Hong Kong-born); 8,440 (Netherlands-born with at least one parent)

Regions with significant populations
- Amsterdam, Rotterdam

Languages
- Dutch, Cantonese, English and Hakka

Religion
- Christianity, Buddhism, Confucianism, Taoism, Folk religions

Related ethnic groups
- Hongkongers in the United Kingdom, Chinese people in the Netherlands

Hongkongers in the Netherlands (Dutch: Hongkongers in Nederland) are people in the Netherlands originated from Hong Kong or having at least once such parent.

According to OECD figures there are 9,935 people in the Netherlands migrated from Hong Kong, a figure which would exclude people who declared other sources of origin and people born in the Netherlands to Hong Kong parents.

As of 2012, figures from the Statistics Netherlands (Centraal Bureau voor de Statistiek) showed that 9,757 Hong Kong-born persons (4,808 men, 4,949 women), and 8,440 persons with at least one parent born in Hong Kong (4,300 men, 4,140 women).

The number of persons of Hong Kong background has shown only mild growth, entirely due to natural increase rather than additional migration; in fact the stock of Hong Kong migrants fell by 5.6% during the same period.

According to F. N. Pieke, Hong Kong was a significant source of ethnic Chinese migrants to the Netherlands in the late 1970s and early 1980s, with about 600 to 800 per year, falling off to around 300 to 400 per year by the late 1980s.

While most Hongkongers are Cantonese by descent, there are Hongkongers who are of Teochew, Hakka, Shanghainese, Hokkien or South Asian descent, and people from overseas Chinese communities in Southeast Asia. Owing to Hong Kong's previous status as a British crown colony, the British nationality of the inhabitants and the existence of people with non-Chinese ancestry, Hongkongers overseas may or may not identify with the Chinese diaspora in the same country.

One of the sources of Hongkongers in the Netherlands are Chinese Indonesians who first migrated to Hong Kong and moved onwards to the Netherlands with their children.

== Notable individuals ==
- Tsui Tin-Chau (born 1958), teacher and radio presenter
- Chow Yiu-Fai (born 1961), professor and lyricist
- Chun Wei Cheung (1972–2006), rower
- Kasing Lung (born 1972), illustrator and toy designer
- Alex Cheung (born 1987), martial artist and actor
- Chloe Yuen (born 1987), actress and television presenter
- Ian Gouw (born 1997), actor
- Ebbie Tam (born 1997), actress
- Kian Fitz-Jim (born 2003), football player
