= Viola Haqi =

Dutch-Iraqi model

- Born: 1974 (age 51–52); Amsterdam, Netherlands
- Modeling information
- Height: 5 ft 9.5 in (1.77 m)
- Hair color: Blonde
- Eye color: Green

Viola Haqi (born 1975 in Amsterdam, Netherlands) is a Dutch fashion model of mixed Dutch and Iraqi heritage.

Her mother worked at an insurance company and her father was a chef. Haqi auditioned for the Conservatory of Amsterdam, but turned it down because of the six lonely years of training it would take. She entered into modeling when a model stopped her on the street and convinced her to come back to her modeling agency. After moving to Paris, her career in modeling started to take off as she was featured in 13 French Elle covers in the course of one year.

She moved to New York two years later and found herself earning a successful career in the advertising and catalogue market. Haqi became part of the rock band "Mink" and later "Dare Me Down", shuffling her time between modeling jobs and gigs at New York City venues like Brownies, Sina-i, Don Hill's and more. Two years after her move to London she came back to New York, cultivating advertising campaigns for Oil of Olay, Clarins, ROC, Oenobiol, La Perla, La Mer, Revlon, Thermasilk, Galenic, Redken and Biore; television commercials for Lexus, Clairol, Ushuaïa, Lee Jeans, and many more; her covers include "Harper's Bazaar", "Elle", "Shape", "Self", "Grazia" and "Eve" magazines. Haqi continued recording a jazz record "My Favorite Time" that was released in 2009 and performed in venues such as Carnegie Hall, Joe's Pub and Metropolitan Room.

== Fashion work ==
=== Magazine covers ===
Magazine	Country	Date
Elle	France	
Elle	Mexico	July 1996
MH - #77	Spain	
Shape	USA	December 2001
Eve	USA	December 2001
Harper's Bazaar	Mexico	May 2004
Real	UK	August 2004
