= Youssef Idilbi =

Dutch actor

- Born: Youssef Sjoerd Idilbi; May 7, 1976; Drachten, Netherlands
- Died: May 15, 2008 (aged 32); Amsterdam, Netherlands
- Occupation: Actor

Youssef Sjoerd Idilbi (May 7, 1976 – May 15, 2008) was a Dutch actor.

== Acting career ==
Born to a Frisian mother and a Palestinian father, Idilbi was one of Holland's first actors from foreign descent. He came out as gay when he was 14 years old.

Idilbi studied theater in Groningen and Amsterdam. His television debut came in 1999, with the role of Abdullah Yildirem in the series Westenwind. He also played in Russen (2001–2002) and Onderweg naar morgen (2002–2003), and in the West Frisian language series Dankert en Dankert.

== Death ==
Idilbi committed suicide on May 15, 2008, by jumping off the roof of the Theater School in Amsterdam.
