= Steur =

Steur is a Dutch surname. Steur is the Dutch word for sturgeon and the surname may be metonymic for a fisherman or may have referred to an address named "de steur" (especially in the form "Van der Steur"). The surname Steurs, mostly limited to the Belgian provinces of Antwerp and Brabant, may have a different origin. People with the name include:

Steur

- Daan Steur (born 2002), Dutch footballer
- Jonas Steur (born 1982), Belgian Trance DJ and producer
- Roy Steur (born 2005), Dutch footballer
- Sean Steur (born 2008), Dutch footballer
- Sebastiaan Steur (born 1984), Dutch footballer

Jansen Steur

- Ernst Jansen Steur (born 1945), Dutch neurologist

De Steur

- Petra De Steur (born 1972), Belgian singer

van der Steur

- Ad van der Steur (1893–1953), Dutch architect
- Ard van der Steur (born 1969), Dutch politician and lawyer

Steurs

- Frida Steurs (born 1958), Belgian linguist
- Geert Steurs (born 1981), Belgian road bicycle racer
- Gerard Steurs (1901–1961), Belgian long-distance runner
- Karen Steurs (born 1979), Belgian road bicycle racer
