= 2026–27 AFC Ajax season =

Dutch football club season

Ajax
2026–27 season
- Owner: AFC Ajax N.V. (Euronext Amsterdam: AJAX)
- CEO: Menno Geelen
- Head coach: Míchel
- Stadium: Johan Cruyff Arena
- Eredivisie: 3rd
- KNVB Cup: Second round
- UEFA Conference League: League phase
- Top goalscorer: League: Tolu Arokodare (7 goals); All: Tolu Arokodare (13 goals)
- Highest home attendance: 54,239 (vs Heerenveen, 16 August 2026; Eredivisie)
- Lowest home attendance: 50,685 (vs Sion, 27 August 2026; UEFA Conference League)
- Average home league attendance: 53,759
- Biggest win: 4–0 (vs Telstar (A); 30 August 2026; Eredivisie)
- Biggest defeat: 1–3 (vs PSV (H); 5 September 2026; Eredivisie)
| Home colours | Away colours | Third colours |

The 2026–27 season is the 127th season in the history of Ajax, and their 71st consecutive season in the Dutch top flight. The club is participating in the Eredivisie, KNVB Cup and UEFA Conference League.

== Players ==
=== Squad ===
As of 16 September 2026

Note: Flags indicate national team as defined under FIFA eligibility rules; some limited exceptions apply. Players may hold more than one non-FIFA nationality.

| No. | Pos. | Nation | Player |
|---|---|---|---|
| 1 | GK | GER | Marc-André ter Stegen (on loan from Barcelona) |
| 2 | DF | BRA | Lucas Rosa |
| 3 | DF | DEN | Anton Gaaei |
| 4 | MF | MAR | Sofyan Amrabat |
| 5 | DF | NED | Owen Wijndal |
| 6 | DF | GER | Thilo Kehrer (on loan from Monaco) |
| 7 | FW | CIV | Simon Adingra (on loan from Sunderland) |
| 8 | MF | GER | Julian Brandt |
| 9 | FW | DEN | Kasper Dolberg |
| 10 | MF | ISR | Oscar Gloukh |
| 11 | FW | UKR | Viktor Tsyhankov |
| 12 | DF | BRA | Caio Henrique |
| 15 | DF | NED | Youri Baas |
| 17 | DF | NED | Daley Blind |

| No. | Pos. | Nation | Player |
|---|---|---|---|
| 18 | MF | NED | Davy Klaassen (captain) |
| 20 | FW | NOR | Oliver Edvardsen |
| 21 | DF | ESP | Jofre Torrents |
| 22 | GK | NED | Joeri Heerkens |
| 23 | FW | NED | Steven Berghuis (vice-captain) |
| 24 | MF | COD | Jorthy Mokio |
| 26 | GK | IDN | Maarten Paes |
| 28 | MF | MLI | Yves Bissouma |
| 30 | DF | NED | Aaron Bouwman |
| 36 | DF | NED | Dies Janse |
| 38 | FW | BRA | Marcos Leonardo |
| 43 | FW | MAR | Rayane Bounida |
| 68 | FW | MAR | Abdellah Ouazane |
| 99 | FW | NGR | Tolu Arokodare (on loan from Wolves) |

== Transfers ==
=== In ===
| Date | Pos. | Player | Transferred from | Fee | Ref. |
|---|---|---|---|---|---|
| 28 June 2026 | LB | (Brazil) Caio Henrique | (France) Monaco (Note: Monaco is a Monégasque club playing in the French football league system.) | €10,500,000 (Note: Also including performance related add-ons) | |
| 8 July 2026 | DF | (Netherlands) Daley Blind | (Spain) Girona | Free transfer | |
| 17 July 2026 | FW | (Brazil) Marcos Leonardo | (Saudi Arabia) Al-Hilal | €19,900,000 | |
| 31 July 2026 | MF | (Germany) Julian Brandt | (Germany) Borussia Dortmund | Free transfer | |
| 17 August 2026 | DF | (Spain) Jofre Torrents | (Spain) Barcelona | Free transfer | |
| 27 August 2026 | FW | (Ukraine) Viktor Tsyhankov | (Spain) Girona | €4,000,000 | |
| 30 August 2026 | MF | (Morocco) Sofyan Amrabat | (Turkey) Fenerbahçe | Free transfer | |
| 16 September 2026 | MF | (Mali) Yves Bissouma | (England) Tottenham Hotspur | Free transfer | |

=== Out ===
| Date | Pos. | Player | Transferred to | Fee | Ref. |
|---|---|---|---|---|---|
| 5 May 2026 | FW | (England) Chuba Akpom | (England) Ipswich Town | €9,300,000 | |
| 20 June 2026 | CM | (Norway) Sivert Mannsverk | (Czech Republic) Sparta Prague | €2,500,000 | |
| 27 June 2026 | FW | (Netherlands) Wout Weghorst | (Netherlands) Twente | Free transfer | |
| 30 June 2026 | DF | (Netherlands) Nick Verschuren | (Netherlands) Sparta Rotterdam | €1,000,000 | |
| 30 June 2026 | DF | (Japan) Takehiro Tomiyasu | (England) Crystal Palace | End of Contract | |
| 30 June 2026 | DF | (Ukraine) Oleksandr Zinchenko | Free Agent | End of Contract | |
| 30 June 2026 | GK | (Czech Republic) Vítězslav Jaroš | (England) Liverpool | Loan return | |
| 9 July 2026 | CM | (Netherlands) Sean Steur | (England) Newcastle United | €23,5000,000 | |
| 10 July 2026 | CM | (Netherlands) Branco van den Boomen | (France) Angers | End of Contract | |
| 31 July 2026 | CM | (Netherlands) Kian Fitz-Jim | (Italy) Torino | €2,500,000 | |
| 20 August 2026 | DF | (Turkey) Ahmetcan Kaplan | (Netherlands) NEC Nijmegen | €2,500,000 | |
| 15 August 2026 | FW | (Belgium) Mika Godts | (France) Paris Saint-Germain | €55,000,000 | |
| 20 August 2026 | DF | (Japan) Kō Itakura | (Germany) Borussia Mönchengladbach | €5,000,000 | |
| 27 August 2026 | DF | (Netherlands) Tristan Gooijer | (Belgium) Lommel SK | €500,000 | |
| 2 September 2026 | FW | (Netherlands) Amourricho van Axel Dongen | Free Agent | Released | |

=== Loans in ===
| Start date | Pos. | Player | From | End date | Fee | Ref. |
|---|---|---|---|---|---|---|
| 29 July 2026 | FW | (Nigeria) Tolu Arokodare | (England) Wolverhampton Wanderers | 30 June 2027 | Undisclosed | |
| 4 August 2026 | GK | (Germany) Marc-André ter Stegen | (Spain) Barcelona | 30 June 2027 | Undisclosed | |
| 2 September 2026 | DF | (Germany) Thilo Kehrer | (France) Monaco | 30 June 2027 | Undisclosed | |
| 2 September 2026 | FW | (Ivory Coast) Simon Adingra | (England) Sunderland | 30 June 2027 | €3,800,000 | |

=== Loans out ===
| Date | Pos. | Player | To | End date | Fee | Ref. |
|---|---|---|---|---|---|---|
| 25 June 2026 | DF | (Netherlands) Gerald Alders | (Netherlands) Telstar | 30 June 2027 | Undisclosed | |
| 28 July 2026 | FW | (Netherlands) Julian Rijkhoff | FC Andorra | 30 June 2027 | Undisclosed | |
| 21 August 2026 | FW | (Netherlands) Don-Angelo Konadu | (Belgium) Lommel SK | 30 June 2027 | Undisclosed | |
| 22 August 2026 | DF | (Croatia) Josip Šutalo | (Italy) Lazio | 30 June 2027 | €3,000,000 | |
| 31 August 2026 | MF | (Netherlands) Youri Regeer | (Germany) Werder Bremen | 30 June 2027 | €200,000 | |
| 31 August 2026 | FW | (Argentina) Maher Carrizo | (Denmark) Copenhagen | 30 June 2027 | Undisclosed | |
| 1 September 2026 | GK | (Netherlands) Paul Reverson | (Netherlands) De Graafschap | 30 June 2027 | Undisclosed | |

== Competitions ==
=== Overall record ===
| Competition | First match | Last match | Starting round | Final position | Record | | | | | | | |
| Competition | First match | Last match | Starting round | Final position | Pld | W | D | L | GF | GA | GD | Win % |
|---|---|---|---|---|---|---|---|---|---|---|---|---|
| Eredivisie | 9 August 2026 | 23 May 2027 | Matchday 1 | TBD | 11 | 7 | 3 | 1 | 30 | 13 | +17 | 63.64 |
| KNVB Cup | 15–17 December 2026 | TBD | Second round | TBD | 0 | 0 | 0 | 0 | 0 | 0 | +0 | — |
| UEFA Conference League | 23 July 2026 | TBD | Second qualifying round | TBD | 8 | 6 | 1 | 1 | 25 | 12 | +13 | 75.00 |
| Total | | | | | 19 | 13 | 4 | 2 | 55 | 25 | +30 | 68.42 |

Last updated: 31 October 2026
Source: Soccerway

=== Eredivisie ===
==== League table ====
| Pos | Team | Pld | W | D | L | GF | GA | GD | Pts | Qualification or relegation |
|---|---|---|---|---|---|---|---|---|---|---|
| 1 | PSV Eindhoven | 12 | 8 | 2 | 2 | 40 | 15 | +25 | 26 | Qualification for the Champions League league phase |
| 2 | Feyenoord | 12 | 7 | 4 | 1 | 36 | 17 | +19 | 25 | Qualification for the Champions League third qualifying round |
| 3 | Ajax | 12 | 7 | 4 | 1 | 32 | 15 | +17 | 25 | Qualification for the Europa League second qualifying round |
| 4 | Twente | 12 | 7 | 3 | 2 | 30 | 12 | +18 | 24 | Qualification for the European competition play-offs |
| 5 | AZ | 12 | 7 | 2 | 3 | 24 | 16 | +8 | 23 | Qualification for the European competition play-offs |

Updated to match(es) played on 8 November 2026. Source: Eredivisie
Rules for classification: 1) Points; 2) Less loss points; 3) Goal difference; 4) Goals scored; 5) Head-to-head points; 6) Head-to-head goal difference; 7) Head-to-head away goals scored; 9) Play-off if relevant for deciding champion, relegation or participating in a European league, otherwise by draw. 9) Penalty shoot-out (only after a play-off)

==== Results summary ====
| Overall | | | | | | | | Home | | | | | | Away | | | | | |
| Pld | W | D | L | GF | GA | GD | Pts | W | D | L | GF | GA | GD | W | D | L | GF | GA | GD |
|---|---|---|---|---|---|---|---|---|---|---|---|---|---|---|---|---|---|---|---|
| 11 | 7 | 3 | 1 | 30 | 13 | +17 | 24 | 2 | 3 | 1 | 12 | 9 | +3 | 5 | 0 | 0 | 18 | 4 | +14 |

Last updated: 31 October 2026.
Source: Eredivisie

==== Results by round ====
| Round | 1 | 2 | 3 | 4 | 5 | 6 | 7 | 8 | 9 | 10 | 11 | 12 | 13 | 14 | 15 | 16 | 17 | 18 | 19 | 20 | 21 | 22 | 23 | 24 | 25 | 26 | 27 | 28 | 29 | 30 | 31 | 32 | 33 | 34 |
|---|---|---|---|---|---|---|---|---|---|---|---|---|---|---|---|---|---|---|---|---|---|---|---|---|---|---|---|---|---|---|---|---|---|---|
| Ground | A | H | A | H | A | H | H | H | A | A | H | A | H | A | H | H | A | A | H | H | A | A | H | H | A | H | A | H | A | A | H | A | H | A |
| Result | W | D | W | W | L | W | D | D | W | W | W | | | | | | | | | | | | | | | | | | | | | | | |
| Position | 3 | 5 | 4 | 4 | 8 | 4 | 5 | 5 | 4 | 2 | 2 | | | | | | | | | | | | | | | | | | | | | | | |

Updated to match(es) played on 31 October 2026. Source: Eredivisie
A = Away; H = Home; W = Win; D = Draw; L = Loss

==== Matches ====
The league fixtures were announced on 9 June 2026.

| 9 August 2026 1 | PEC Zwolle | 0–2 | Ajax | Zwolle |
| 14:30 CEST (UTC+2) | Floranus (red card) 57'; Reiziger (yellow card) 88'; Kostons (yellow card) 89' | Report | Ouazane (yellow card) 33'; Mokio 76'; Klaassen (yellow card) 86'; Brandt 90+5' | Stadium: MAC³PARK Stadion; Attendance: 14,000; Referee: Jannick van der Laan |

| 16 August 2026 2 | Ajax | 2–2 | Heerenveen | Amsterdam |
| 16:45 CEST (UTC+2) | Klaverboer 7' (o.g.); Ouazane 33'; Regeer (yellow card) 57'; Bouwman (yellow card) 65'; Rosa (yellow card) 86' | Report | Trenskow 45', (yellow card) 51'; Rivera 82' | Stadium: Johan Cruyff Arena; Attendance: 54,239; Referee: Alex Bos |

| 30 August 2026 4 | Telstar | 0–4 | Ajax | Velsen |
| 16:45 CEST (UTC+2) | | Report | Klaassen 37'; Berghuis 56'; Arokodare 60'; Marcos Leonardo 78' | Stadium: 711 Stadion; Attendance: 5,146; Referee: Dennis Higler |

| 5 September 2026 5 | Ajax | 1–3 | PSV | Amsterdam |
| 20:00 CEST (UTC+2) | Arokodare 23'; Klaassen (yellow card) 80'; Baas (yellow card) 81'; Gaaei (yellow card) 90+6' | Report | Pepi 5'; Sano (yellow card) 16'; Fernandez (yellow card) 37'; Geertruida 45+1', (yellow card) 84'; Kostić (yellow card) 74'; van Bommel (yellow card) 81'; Perišić (yellow card) 81'; Bajraktarević 90+2' | Stadium: Johan Cruyff Arena; Attendance: 53,332; Referee: Sander van der Eijk |

| 12 September 2026 6 | Fortuna Sittard | 1–5 | Ajax | Sittard |
| 20:00 CEST (UTC+2) | Zeefuik (yellow card) 44'; Descotte 52' | Report | Mokio (yellow card) 6'; Baas (yellow card) 23', (goal) 90+6'; Brandt 35'; Kehrer 62'; Berghuis (yellow card) 64'; Caio Henrique (yellow card) 71'; Klaassen 73'; Dolberg 79'; Ouazane (yellow card) 81' | Stadium: Fortuna Sittard Stadion; Attendance: 12,162; Referee: Jeroen Manschot |

| 15 September 2026 3 | Ajax | 5–1 | Willem II | Amsterdam |
| 20:00 CEST (UTC+2) | Klaassen 41'; Brandt 45'; Tsygankov 69'; Gloukh 74'; Dolberg 87' | Report | Ciranni 75' | Stadium: Johan Cruyff Arena; Attendance: 54,018; Referee: Allard Lindhout |

| 19 September 2026 7 | Ajax | 2–2 | Excelsior | Amsterdam |
| 20:00 CEST (UTC+2) | Brandt 32'; Arokodare 64'; Gloukh (yellow card) 85' | Report | Plug (yellow card) 35'; Hartjes 45+1'; Sliti 62'; Yegoian (yellow card) 85' | Stadium: Johan Cruyff Arena; Attendance: 54,175; Referee: Jannick van der Laan |

| 10 October 2026 8 | Ajax | 1–1 | NEC | Amsterdam |
| 21:00 CEST (UTC+2) | Arokodare 7'; Ouazane (yellow card) 67' | Report | Chery 19' (pen.); Linssen (yellow card) 33'; Brás (yellow card) 54' | Stadium: Johan Cruyff Arena; Attendance: 53,457; Referee: Serdar Gözübüyük |

| 18 October 2026 9 | Groningen | 2–5 | Ajax | Groningen |
| 16:45 CEST (UTC+1) | Van Bergen (yellow card) 40', (goal) 80', (penalty missed) 90+1'; Willumsson 49' | Report | Klaassen (penalty missed) 10'; Brandt 27', 60'; Bouwman 37'; Janse (yellow card) 45+2'; Mokio 69', 75'; Rosa (yellow card) 90' | Stadium: Euroborg; Attendance: 22,525; Referee: Dennis Higler |

| 25 October 2026 10 | Sparta Rotterdam | 1–2 | Ajax | Rotterdam |
| 16:45 CET (UTC+1) | Toornstra 43'; Babadi (yellow card) 89' | Report | Ouazane 22'; Arokodare 45+1'; Brandt (yellow card) 64'; Rosa (yellow card) 90+3' | Stadium: Sparta Stadion Het Kasteel; Attendance: 10,733; Referee: Danny Makkelie |

| 31 October 2026 11 | Ajax | 1–0 | AZ | Amsterdam |
| 21:00 CEST (UTC+2) | Arokodare 9'; Ouazane (yellow card) 30' | Report | Patati (yellow card) 26'; De Wit (yellow card) 44' | Stadium: Johan Cruyff Arena; Attendance: 53,331; Referee: Allard Lindhout |

| 8 November 2026 12 | Twente | 2-2 | Ajax | Enschede |
| 14:30 CET (UTC+1) | Janse (o.g.) 68'; Weghorst (p.) 66' | Report | Arokodare 3'; Bounida 66' | Stadium: De Grolsch Veste; Referee: Joey Kooij |

| 22 November 2026 13 | Ajax | v | ADO Den Haag | Amsterdam |
| 14:30 CET (UTC+1) | | Report | | Stadium: Johan Cruyff Arena |

| 29 November 2026 14 | Feyenoord | v | Ajax | Rotterdam |
| 14:30 CET (UTC+1) | | Report | | Stadium: De Kuip |

| 6 December 2026 15 | Ajax | v | Utrecht | Amsterdam |
| 14:30 CET (UTC+1) | | Report | | Stadium: Johan Cruyff Arena |

| 13 December 2026 16 | Ajax | v | Cambuur | Amsterdam |
| 20:00 CET (UTC+1) | | Report | | Stadium: Johan Cruyff Arena |

| 20 December 2026 17 | Go Ahead Eagles | v | Ajax | Deventer |
| 16:45 CET (UTC+1) | | Report | | Stadium: De Adelaarshorst |

| 9 January 2027 18 | Willem II | v | Ajax | Tilburg |
| 20:00 CET (UTC+1) | | Report | | Stadium: Koning Willem II Stadion |

| 17 January 2027 19 | Ajax | v | Groningen | Amsterdam |
| 14:30 CET (UTC+1) | | Report | | Stadium: Johan Cruyff Arena |

| 23 January 2027 20 | Ajax | v | Telstar | Amsterdam |
| 16:30 CET (UTC+1) | | Report | | Stadium: Johan Cruyff Arena |

| 31 January 2027 21 | Heerenveen | v | Ajax | Heerenveen |
| 12:15 CET (UTC+1) | | Report | | Stadium: Abe Lenstra Stadion |

| 13 February 2027 22 | Excelsior | v | Ajax | Rotterdam |
| --:-- CET (UTC+1) | | Report | | Stadium: Van Donge & De Roo Stadion |

| 20 February 2027 23 | Ajax | v | Go Ahead Eagles | Amsterdam |
| --:-- CET (UTC+1) | | Report | | Stadium: Johan Cruyff Arena |

| 27 February 2027 24 | Ajax | v | Feyenoord | Amsterdam |
| --:-- CET (UTC+1) | | Report | | Stadium: Johan Cruyff Arena |

| 6 March 2027 25 | ADO Den Haag | v | Ajax | The Hague |
| --:-- CET (UTC+1) | | Report | | Stadium: WerkTalent Stadion |

| 13 March 2027 26 | Ajax | v | PEC Zwolle | Amsterdam |
| --:-- CET (UTC+1) | | Report | | Stadium: Johan Cruyff Arena |

| 20 March 2027 27 | NEC | v | Ajax | Nijmegen |
| --:-- CET (UTC+1) | | Report | | Stadium: Goffertstadion |

| 3 April 2027 28 | Ajax | v | Twente | Amsterdam |
| --:-- CEST (UTC+2) | | Report | | Stadium: Johan Cruyff Arena |

| 10 April 2027 29 | Utrecht | v | Ajax | Utrecht |
| --:-- CEST (UTC+2) | | Report | | Stadium: Stadion Galgenwaard |

| 24 April 2027 30 | PSV | v | Ajax | Eindhoven |
| --:-- CEST (UTC+2) | | Report | | Stadium: Philips Stadion |

| 1 May 2027 31 | Ajax | v | Fortuna Sittard | Amsterdam |
| --:-- CEST (UTC+2) | | Report | | Stadium: Johan Cruyff Arena |

| 8 May 2027 32 | AZ | v | Ajax | Alkmaar |
| --:-- CEST (UTC+2) | | Report | | Stadium: AFAS Stadion |

| 16 May 2027 33 | Ajax | v | Sparta Rotterdam | Amsterdam |
| 14:30 CEST (UTC+2) | | Report | | Stadium: Johan Cruyff Arena |

| 23 May 2027 34 | Cambuur | v | Ajax | Leeuwarden |
| 14:30 CEST (UTC+2) | | Report | | Stadium: Kooi Stadion |

=== KNVB Cup ===
| 15–17 December 2026 Second round | Ajax | v | Den Bosch | Amsterdam |
| --:-- CET (UTC+1) | | Report | | Stadium: Johan Cruyff Arena |

=== UEFA Conference League ===
==== Second qualifying round ====
The draw for the second qualifying round was held on 17 June 2026.

| 23 July 2026 First leg | Vojvodina (Serbia) | 1–4 | (Netherlands) Ajax | Novi Sad, Serbia |
| 20:00 CEST (UTC+2) | Tanjga (yellow card) 18'; Sukačev 28'; Mulahusejnović (yellow card) 64'; Barros (yellow card) 84' | Report | Klaassen 3'; Berghuis 38'; Gloukh 58'; Abdalla 90+3' | Stadium: Karađorđe Stadium; Attendance: 7,473; Referee: Miguel Nogueira (Portugal) |

| 30 July 2026 Second leg | Ajax (Netherlands) | 4–1 (8–2 agg.) | (Serbia) Vojvodina | Amsterdam, Netherlands |
| 20:00 CEST (UTC+2) | Klaassen 44'; Gloukh 53', 58', 71' | Report | Crnomarković 40'; Mitrović (yellow card) 69'; Kolarević (yellow card) 88' | Stadium: Johan Cruyff Arena; Attendance: 51,251; Referee: Christos Vergetis (Greece) |

==== Third qualifying round ====
The draw for the third qualifying round was held on 20 July 2026.

| 6 August 2026 First leg | Ajax (Netherlands) | 3–1 | (Republic of Ireland) Shelbourne | Amsterdam, Netherlands |
| 20:00 CEST (UTC+2) | Godts 6' (pen.); Wijndal 22'; Dolberg 50'; Mokio (yellow card) 85' | Report | Caffrey (yellow card) 47'; Kelly 84' | Stadium: Johan Cruyff Arena; Attendance: 51,871; Referee: Atilla Karaoglan (Turkey) |

| 13 August 2026 Second leg | Shelbourne (Republic of Ireland) | 2–2 (5–3 agg.) | (Netherlands) Ajax | Dublin, Republic of Ireland |
| 19:45 BST (UTC+1) | Freitas 24', (yellow card) 27'; Lunney (yellow card) 70'; Roche (yellow card) 74'; Moore 85'; Gannon (yellow card) 90+2' | Report | Brandt 20'; Bouwman (yellow card) 23'; Marcos Leonardo (yellow card) 25'; Gaaei 39' | Stadium: Tolka Park; Attendance: 4,344; Referee: Cláudio Pereira (Portugal) |

==== Play-off round ====
The draw for the play-off round was held on 3 August 2026.

| 20 August 2026 First leg | Sion (Switzerland) | 2–4 | (Netherlands) Ajax | Sion, Switzerland |
| 20:15 CEST (UTC+2) | Batata (yellow card) 30'; Surdez 34'; Chouaref 71' (pen.) | Report | Reeger (yellow card) 36'; Brandt 53'; Marcos Leonardo 60'; Mokio (yellow card) 69'; Arokodare 74'; Gaaei (yellow card) 77'; Klaassen 87'; Rosa (yellow card) 90+5' | Stadium: Stade Tourbillon; Attendance: 9,000; Referee: Mohammed Al-Hakim (Sweden) |

| 27 August 2026 Second leg | Ajax (Netherlands) | 5–3 (9–5 agg.) | (Switzerland) Sion | Amsterdam, Netherlands |
| 20:00 CEST (UTC+2) | Baas 1'; Klaassen 39'; Arokodare 45+1', 51'; Edvardsen 54' | Report | Boteli 18', 36', 90'; Sow (yellow card) 50'; Lavanchy (yellow card) 59' | Stadium: Johan Cruyff Arena; Attendance: 50,685; Referee: Julian Weinberger (Austria) |

==== League phase ====
The draw for the league phase was held on 28 August 2026.

| Pos | Team | Pld | W | D | L | GF | GA | GD | Pts | Qualification |
|---|---|---|---|---|---|---|---|---|---|---|
| 9 | (Sweden) Mjällby AIF | 3 | 2 | 1 | 0 | 5 | 1 | +4 | 7 | Advance to knockout phase play-offs (seeded) |
| 10 | (Belgium) Sint-Truiden | 3 | 2 | 1 | 0 | 4 | 1 | +3 | 7 | Advance to knockout phase play-offs (seeded) |
| 11 | (Netherlands) Ajax | 3 | 2 | 0 | 1 | 9 | 3 | +6 | 6 | Advance to knockout phase play-offs (seeded) |
| 12 | (Turkey) Trabzonspor | 3 | 2 | 0 | 1 | 6 | 3 | +3 | 6 | Advance to knockout phase play-offs (seeded) |
| 13 | (Croatia) Hajduk Split | 3 | 2 | 0 | 1 | 3 | 2 | +1 | 6 | Advance to knockout phase play-offs (seeded) |

Updated to match(es) played on 5 November 2026. Source: UEFA
Rules for classification: League phase tiebreakers

| Round | 1 | 2 | 3 | 4 | 5 | 6 |
|---|---|---|---|---|---|---|
| Ground | A | H | A | H | A | H |
| Result | L | W | W | | | |
| Position | 25 | 13 | | | | |

Updated to match(es) played on 5 November 2026. Source: UEFA
A = Away; H = Home; W = Win; D = Draw; L = Loss

| 15 October 2026 1 | Hajduk Split (Croatia) | 2–1 | (Netherlands) Ajax | Split, Croatia |
| 18:45 CEST (UTC+2) | Sanyang 37'; Del Moral (yellow card) 45'; Šotiček 55'; Šego (yellow card) 60' | Report | Klaassen 53'; Baas (yellow card) 90+5' | Stadium: Stadion Poljud; Attendance: 32,136; Referee: Christian-Petru Ciochirca (Austria) |

| 22 October 2026 2 | Ajax (Netherlands) | 2–0 | (Italy) Atalanta | Amsterdam, Netherlands |
| 21:00 CEST (UTC+2) | Amrabat (yellow card) 45'; Arokodare 87'; Ter Stegen (yellow card) 90+2'; Ouazane 90+3' | Report | Samardžić (yellow card) 68'; Zalewski (yellow card) 86' | Stadium: Johan Cruyff Arena; Attendance: 51,739; Referee: António Nobre (Portugal) |

| 5 November 2026 3 | Midtjylland (Denmark) | 1–6 | (Netherlands) Ajax | Herning, Denmark |
| 18:45 CET (UTC+1) | Etim 28'; Wätjen (yellow card) 35' (yellow-red card) 43'; Castillo (yellow card) 45+1' | Report | Arokodare 9', 52'; Wijndal 59'; Klaassen 67'; Gloukh 74'; Leonardo 82' | Stadium: MCH Arena; Referee: Paweł Raczkowski (Poland) |

| 26 November 2026 4 | Ajax (Netherlands) | v | (Switzerland) Thun | Amsterdam, Netherlands |
| 18:45 CET (UTC+1) | | Report | | Stadium: Johan Cruyff Arena |

| 10 December 2026 5 | Sint-Truiden (Belgium) | v | (Netherlands) Ajax | Sint-Truiden, Belgium |
| 21:00 CET (UTC+1) | | Report | | Stadium: Stayen |

| 17 December 2026 6 | Ajax (Netherlands) | v | (Spain) Getafe | Amsterdam, Netherlands |
| 21:00 CET (UTC+1) | | Report | | Stadium: Johan Cruyff Arena |

== Statistics ==
=== Appearances and goals ===
| No. | Pos | Nat | Player | Total | | Eredivisie | | KNVB Cup | | Conference League | |
| No. | Pos | Nat | Player | Apps | Goals | Apps | Goals | Apps | Goals | Apps | Goals |
|---|---|---|---|---|---|---|---|---|---|---|---|
| 1 | GK | (Germany) GER | Marc-André ter Stegen | 14 | 0 | 10 | 0 | 0 | 0 | 4 | 0 |
| 2 | DF | (Brazil) BRA | Lucas Rosa | 13 | 0 | 7 | 0 | 0 | 0 | 5+1 | 0 |
| 3 | DF | (Denmark) DEN | Anton Gaaei | 8 | 1 | 5 | 0 | 0 | 0 | 3 | 1 |
| 4 | MF | (Morocco) MAR | Sofyan Amrabat | 10 | 0 | 5+3 | 0 | 0 | 0 | 2 | 0 |
| 5 | DF | (Netherlands) NED | Owen Wijndal | 11 | 1 | 3+2 | 0 | 0 | 0 | 5+1 | 1 |
| 6 | DF | (Germany) GER | Thilo Kehrer | 7 | 1 | 5+1 | 1 | 0 | 0 | 1 | 0 |
| 7 | FW | (Ivory Coast) CIV | Simon Adingra | 1 | 0 | 0+1 | 0 | 0 | 0 | 0 | 0 |
| 8 | MF | (Germany) GER | Julian Brandt | 17 | 8 | 9+2 | 6 | 0 | 0 | 5+1 | 2 |
| 9 | FW | (Denmark) DEN | Kasper Dolberg | 9 | 3 | 4+2 | 2 | 0 | 0 | 3 | 1 |
| 10 | MF | (Israel) ISR | Oscar Gloukh | 18 | 5 | 8+3 | 1 | 0 | 0 | 5+2 | 4 |
| 11 | FW | (Ukraine) UKR | Viktor Tsyhankov | 8 | 1 | 3+3 | 1 | 0 | 0 | 1+1 | 0 |
| 12 | DF | (Brazil) BRA | Caio Henrique | 12 | 0 | 6+1 | 0 | 0 | 0 | 2+3 | 0 |
| 15 | DF | (Netherlands) NED | Youri Baas | 15 | 2 | 9+1 | 1 | 0 | 0 | 4+1 | 1 |
| 17 | DF | (Netherlands) NED | Daley Blind | 6 | 0 | 0+2 | 0 | 0 | 0 | 4 | 0 |
| 18 | MF | (Netherlands) NED | Davy Klaassen | 18 | 8 | 8+3 | 3 | 0 | 0 | 7 | 5 |
| 20 | MF | (Norway) NOR | Oliver Edvardsen | 8 | 1 | 1+3 | 0 | 0 | 0 | 1+3 | 1 |
| 21 | DF | (Spain) ESP | Jofre Torrents | 2 | 0 | 0+1 | 0 | 0 | 0 | 1 | 0 |
| 22 | GK | (Netherlands) NED | Joeri Heerkens | 0 | 0 | 0 | 0 | 0 | 0 | 0 | 0 |
| 23 | FW | (Netherlands) NED | Steven Berghuis | 12 | 2 | 6+1 | 1 | 0 | 0 | 5 | 1 |
| 24 | FW | (Belgium) BEL | Jorthy Mokio | 19 | 3 | 9+2 | 3 | 0 | 0 | 2+6 | 0 |
| 26 | GK | (Indonesia) IDN | Maarten Paes | 5 | 0 | 1 | 0 | 0 | 0 | 4 | 0 |
| 28 | MF | (Mali) MLI | Yves Bissouma | 7 | 0 | 0+3 | 0 | 0 | 0 | 4 | 0 |
| 30 | DF | (Netherlands) NED | Aaron Bouwman | 15 | 1 | 6+1 | 1 | 0 | 0 | 8 | 0 |
| 36 | DF | (Netherlands) NED | Dies Janse | 7 | 0 | 3+1 | 0 | 0 | 0 | 0+3 | 0 |
| 38 | FW | (Brazil) BRA | Marcos Leonardo | 14 | 2 | 1+6 | 1 | 0 | 0 | 3+4 | 1 |
| 43 | MF | (Morocco) MAR | Rayane Bounida | 1 | 0 | 0+1 | 0 | 0 | 0 | 0 | 0 |
| 67 | MF | (Netherlands) NED | Mohamed Abdalla | 1 | 1 | 0 | 0 | 0 | 0 | 0+1 | 1 |
| 68 | FW | (Morocco) MAR | Abdellah Ouazane | 17 | 3 | 4+6 | 2 | 0 | 0 | 2+5 | 1 |
| 99 | FW | (Nigeria) NGR | Tolu Arokodare | 16 | 10 | 7+4 | 6 | 0 | 0 | 2+3 | 4 |
Players sold or loaned out after the start of the season:
| 4 | DF | (Japan) JPN | Ko Itakura | 0 | 0 | 0 | 0 | 0 | 0 | 0 | 0 |
| 6 | MF | (Netherlands) NED | Youri Regeer | 8 | 0 | 2 | 0 | 0 | 0 | 6 | 0 |
| 7 | FW | (Argentina) ARG | Maher Carrizo | 2 | 0 | 0 | 0 | 0 | 0 | 1+1 | 0 |
| 11 | FW | (Belgium) BEL | Mika Godts | 4 | 1 | 0+1 | 0 | 0 | 0 | 3 | 1 |
| 19 | FW | (Netherlands) NED | Don-Angelo Konadu | 1 | 0 | 0 | 0 | 0 | 0 | 0+1 | 0 |
| 27 | FW | (Netherlands) NED | Amourricho van Axel Dongen | 0 | 0 | 0 | 0 | 0 | 0 | 0 | 0 |
| 37 | DF | (Croatia) CRO | Josip Šutalo | 0 | 0 | 0 | 0 | 0 | 0 | 0 | 0 |
| 52 | GK | (Ghana) GHA | Paul Reverson | 0 | 0 | 0 | 0 | 0 | 0 | 0 | 0 |

Source: Competitive matches

=== Goalscorers ===
| Rank | No | Pos | Nat | Name | Eredivisie | KNVB Cup | Conference League | Total |
|---|---|---|---|---|---|---|---|---|
| 1 | 99 | FW | (Nigeria) | Tolu Arokodare | 6 | 0 | 4 | 10 |
| 2 | 8 | MF | (Germany) | Julian Brandt | 6 | 0 | 2 | 8 |
| 2 | 18 | MF | (Netherlands) | Davy Klaassen | 3 | 0 | 5 | 8 |
| 4 | 10 | MF | (Israel) | Oscar Gloukh | 1 | 0 | 4 | 5 |
| 5 | 9 | FW | (Denmark) | Kasper Dolberg | 2 | 0 | 1 | 3 |
| 5 | 24 | FW | (Belgium) | Jorthy Mokio | 3 | 0 | 0 | 3 |
| 5 | 68 | FW | (Morocco) | Abdellah Ouazane | 2 | 0 | 1 | 3 |
| 8 | 15 | DF | (Netherlands) | Youri Baas | 1 | 0 | 1 | 2 |
| 8 | 23 | FW | (Netherlands) | Steven Berghuis | 1 | 0 | 1 | 2 |
| 8 | 38 | FW | (Brazil) | Marcos Leonardo | 1 | 0 | 1 | 2 |
| 10 | 3 | DF | (Denmark) | Anton Gaaei | 0 | 0 | 1 | 1 |
| 10 | 5 | DF | (Netherlands) | Owen Wijndal | 0 | 0 | 1 | 1 |
| 10 | 6 | DF | (Germany) | Thilo Kehrer | 1 | 0 | 0 | 1 |
| 10 | 11 | FW | (Ukraine) | Viktor Tsyhankov | 1 | 0 | 0 | 1 |
| 10 | 20 | FW | (Norway) | Oliver Edvardsen | 0 | 0 | 1 | 1 |
| 10 | 30 | DF | (Netherlands) | Aaron Bouwman | 1 | 0 | 0 | 1 |
| 10 | 67 | MF | (Netherlands) | Mohamed Abdalla | 0 | 0 | 1 | 1 |
| 10 | | FW | (Belgium) | Mika Godts | 0 | 0 | 1 | 1 |
| Own goal | | | | | 1 | 0 | 0 | 1 |
| Totals | | | | | 30 | 0 | 25 | 55 |

Source: Competitive matches

=== Assists ===
| Rank | No | Pos | Nat | Name | Eredivisie | KNVB Cup | Conference League | Total |
|---|---|---|---|---|---|---|---|---|
| 1 | 23 | FW | (Netherlands) | Steven Berghuis | 2 | 0 | 3 | 5 |
| 2 | 10 | MF | (Israel) | Oscar Gloukh | 4 | 0 | 0 | 4 |
| 2 | 68 | FW | (Morocco) | Abdellah Ouazane | 1 | 0 | 3 | 4 |
| 4 | 9 | FW | (Denmark) | Kasper Dolberg | 3 | 0 | 0 | 3 |
| 4 | 99 | FW | (Nigeria) | Tolu Arokodare | 1 | 0 | 2 | 3 |
| 4 | | FW | (Belgium) | Mika Godts | 1 | 0 | 2 | 3 |
| 7 | 2 | DF | (Brazil) | Lucas Rosa | 1 | 0 | 1 | 2 |
| 7 | 6 | DF | (Germany) | Thilo Kehrer | 1 | 0 | 1 | 2 |
| 7 | 8 | MF | (Germany) | Julian Brandt | 2 | 0 | 0 | 2 |
| 7 | 12 | DF | (Brazil) | Caio Henrique | 1 | 0 | 1 | 2 |
| 7 | 24 | FW | (Belgium) | Jorthy Mokio | 2 | 0 | 0 | 2 |
| 12 | 3 | DF | (Denmark) | Anton Gaaei | 0 | 0 | 1 | 1 |
| 12 | 5 | DF | (Netherlands) | Owen Wijndal | 1 | 0 | 0 | 1 |
| 12 | 11 | FW | (Ukraine) | Viktor Tsyhankov | 1 | 0 | 0 | 1 |
| 12 | 18 | MF | (Netherlands) | Davy Klaassen | 1 | 0 | 0 | 1 |
| 12 | 20 | FW | (Norway) | Oliver Edvardsen | 0 | 0 | 1 | 1 |
| 12 | | MF | (Netherlands) | Youri Regeer | 0 | 0 | 1 | 1 |
| Totals | | | | | 22 | 0 | 16 | 38 |

Source: Competitive matches

=== Clean sheets ===
| Rank | No | Pos | Nat | Name | Eredivisie | KNVB Cup | Conference League | Total |
|---|---|---|---|---|---|---|---|---|
| 1 | 1 | GK | (Germany) | Marc-André ter Stegen | 3 | 0 | 1 | 4 |
| Total | | | | | 3 | 0 | 1 | 4 |

Source: Competitive matches

=== Disciplinary record ===
| N | P | Nat. | Name | Eredivisie | | | KNVB Cup | | | Conference League | | | Total | | | Notes |
| N | P | Nat. | Name | Yellow card | Second yellow card | Red card | Yellow card | Second yellow card | Red card | Yellow card | Second yellow card | Red card | Yellow card | Second yellow card | Red card | Notes |
| 2 | DF | (Brazil) | Lucas Rosa | 3 | | | | | | 1 | | | 4 | | | |
| 3 | DF | (Denmark) | Anton Gaaei | 1 | | | | | | 1 | | | 2 | | | |
| 4 | DF | (Morocco) | Sofyan Amrabat | | | | | | | 1 | | | 1 | | | |
| 8 | DF | (Germany) | Julian Brandt | 1 | | | | | | | | | 1 | | | |
| 10 | DF | (Denmark) | Oscar Gloukh | 1 | | | | | | | | | 1 | | | |
| 12 | MF | (Brazil) | Caio Henrique | 1 | | | | | | | | | 1 | | | |
| 15 | DF | (Netherlands) | Youri Baas | 2 | | | | | | 1 | | | 3 | | | |
| 18 | MF | (Netherlands) | Davy Klaassen | 2 | | | | | | | | | 2 | | | |
| 23 | FW | (Netherlands) | Steven Berghuis | 1 | | | | | | | | | 1 | | | |
| 24 | FW | (Belgium) | Jorthy Mokio | 2 | | | | | | 2 | | | 4 | | | |
| 30 | DF | (Netherlands) | Aaron Bouwman | 1 | | | | | | 1 | | | 2 | | | |
| 36 | FW | (Netherlands) | Dies Janse | 1 | | | | | | | | | 1 | | | |
| 38 | FW | (Brazil) | Marcos Leonardo | | | | | | | 1 | | | 1 | | | |
| 68 | FW | (Morocco) | Abdellah Ouazane | 4 | | | | | | | | | 4 | | | |
| | MF | (Netherlands) | Youri Regeer | 1 | | | | | | 1 | | | 2 | | | |

Source: Competitive matches
Only competitive matches
(yellow card) = Number of bookings; (second yellow card) = Number of sending offs after a second yellow card; (red card) = Number of sending offs by a direct red card.
