= Rayane Bounida =

Moroccan professional footballer (born 2006)

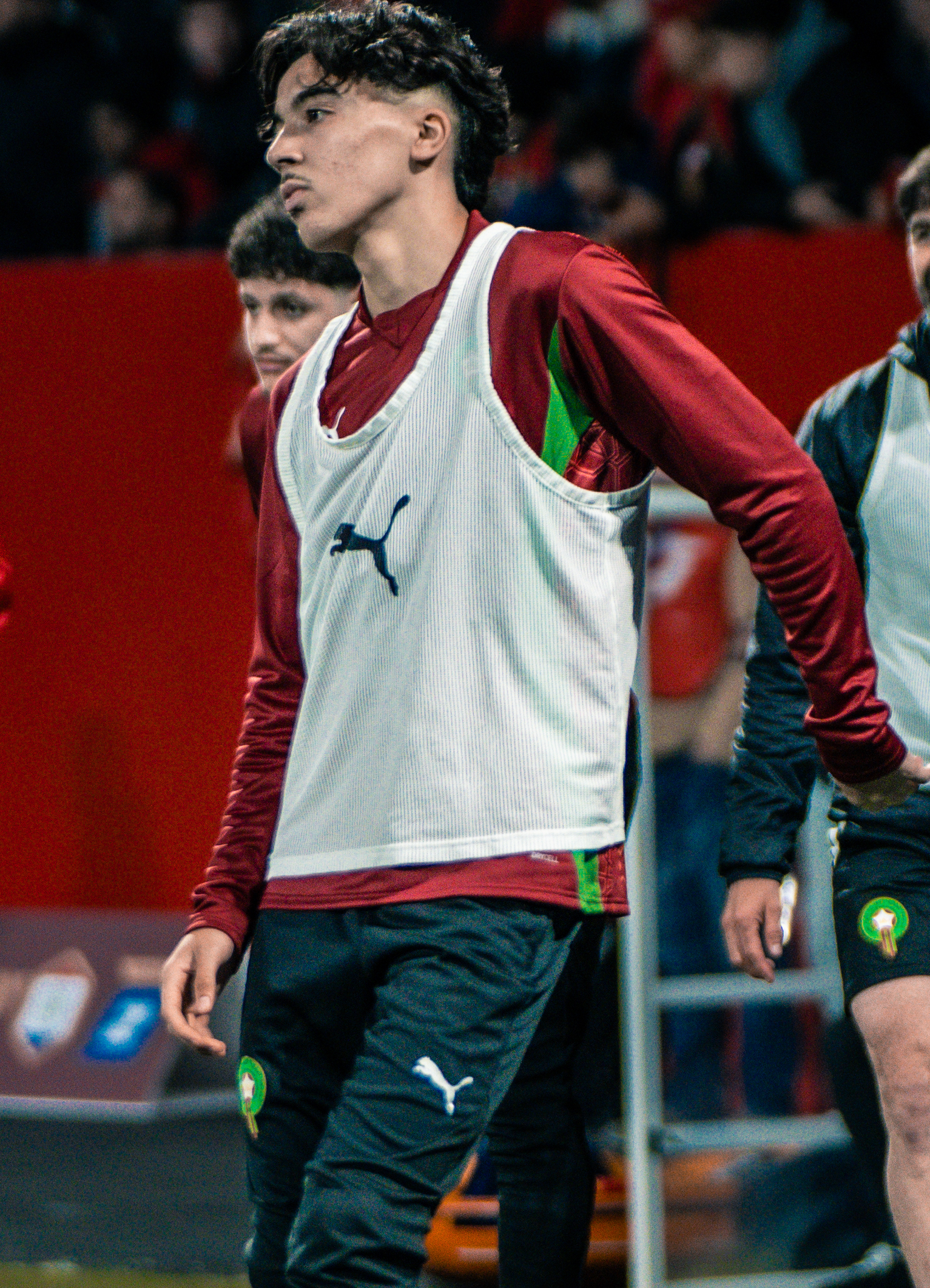
- Bounida warming up against Paraguay

Personal information
- Date of birth: 3 March 2006 (age 20)
- Place of birth: Vilvoorde, Belgium
- Height: 1.79 m (5 ft 10 in)
- Position: Attacking midfielder

Team information
- Current team: Ajax
- Number: 43

Youth career
- KFC Vilvoorde
- OH Leuven
- –2022: Anderlecht
- 2022–2024: Ajax

Senior career*
| Years | Team | Apps | (Gls) |
| 2024– | Jong Ajax | 29 | (8) |
| 2025– | Ajax | 24 | (1) |

International career^{‡}
| 2021–2022 | Belgium U16 | 16 | (4) |
| 2022–2023 | Belgium U17 | 7 | (1) |
| 2023–2024 | Belgium U18 | 6 | (3) |
| 2024–2025 | Belgium U19 | 10 | (2) |
| 2025 | Belgium U21 | 2 | (0) |
| 2026– | Morocco | 1 | (0) |
- * Club domestic league appearances and goals as of 18 October 2026 ‡ National team caps and goals as of 16:53, 2 June 2026 (UTC)

Rayane Bounida (born 3 March 2006) is a professional footballer who plays as a midfielder for the Eredivisie club Ajax. Regarded as a child prodigy, Bounida garnered significant media attention from a young age. By his 16th birthday, he had secured a sponsorship contract with Nike and amassed a significant social media following. Born in Belgium, he plays for the Morocco national team.

== Club career ==
=== Early career ===
Bounida progressed through the youth academy of Anderlecht. During his time there, he was frequently featured in international media as a highly rated prospect. Attracting interest from major European clubs such as Manchester City and Paris Saint-Germain, it was announced on his sixteenth birthday that he would sign a professional contract with Ajax. The deal reportedly included an annual salary of €700,000.

=== Ajax ===
==== 2024–25 season ====
On 9 December 2024, Bounida made his senior debut for Ajax's reserve team, Jong Ajax, in an Eerste Divisie match against De Graafschap. He entered as an 86th-minute substitute and scored in stoppage time to secure a 2–0 victory.

Bounida's progress was rewarded on 15 February 2025 with a contract extension, binding him to the club until June 2028 with an option for an additional year. Just one day later, on 16 February 2025, he made his first-team debut for Ajax in a 4–0 Eredivisie victory over Heracles, coming off the bench in the second half. He finished the campaign with 19 appearances and six goals for Jong Ajax, alongside his single senior outing.

==== 2025–26 season ====
Ahead of the 2025–26 season, Bounida was promoted to the first-team squad. He made his UEFA Champions League debut on 25 November 2025, starting in a group stage match against Benfica. While continuing to gain minutes in the Eredivisie, he scored his first goal for the senior team on 17 December 2025 in a KNVB Cup match against Excelsior. During the match, he recorded a goal and four assists—two of which were for fellow Belgian Jorthy Mokio—helping Ajax to a 7–2 victory.

== International career ==
Born in Belgium, Bounida is of Moroccan descent. He was a youth international for Belgium, having represented the nation at under-16, under-17, under-18, under-19, and under-21 levels. On 25 March 2026, Bounida's request to switch allegiance to Morocco was approved by FIFA. He was called up to the Morocco national team in March 2026.

== Career statistics ==
=== Club ===
As of 18 October 2026

Appearances and goals by club, season and competition
| Club | Season | League | | | KNVB Cup | | Europe | | Other | | Total | |
| Club | Season | Division | Apps | Goals | Apps | Goals | Apps | Goals | Apps | Goals | Apps | Goals |
|---|---|---|---|---|---|---|---|---|---|---|---|---|
| Jong Ajax | 2024–25 | Eerste Divisie | 19 | 6 | — | | — | | — | | 19 | 6 |
| Jong Ajax | 2025–26 | Eerste Divisie | 10 | 2 | — | | — | | — | | 10 | 2 |
| Jong Ajax | Total | | 29 | 8 | — | | — | | — | | 29 | 8 |
| Ajax | 2024–25 | Eredivisie | 1 | 0 | — | | 0 | 0 | — | | 1 | 0 |
| Ajax | 2025–26 | Eredivisie | 22 | 1 | 2 | 1 | 4 (Note: Appearances in UEFA Champions League) | 0 | 0 | 0 | 28 | 2 |
| Ajax | 2026–27 | Eredivisie | 1 | 0 | 0 | 0 | 0 | 0 | — | | 1 | 0 |
| Ajax | Total | | 24 | 1 | 2 | 1 | 4 | 0 | 0 | 0 | 30 | 2 |
| Career total | | | 51 | 9 | 2 | 1 | 4 | 0 | 0 | 0 | 57 | 10 |

=== International ===
As of match played 26 May 2026

Appearances and goals by national team and year
| National team | Year | Apps | Goals |
|---|---|---|---|
| Morocco | 2026 | 1 | 0 |
| Total | | 1 | 0 |
