= Don-Angelo Konadu =

Dutch footballer (born 2006)

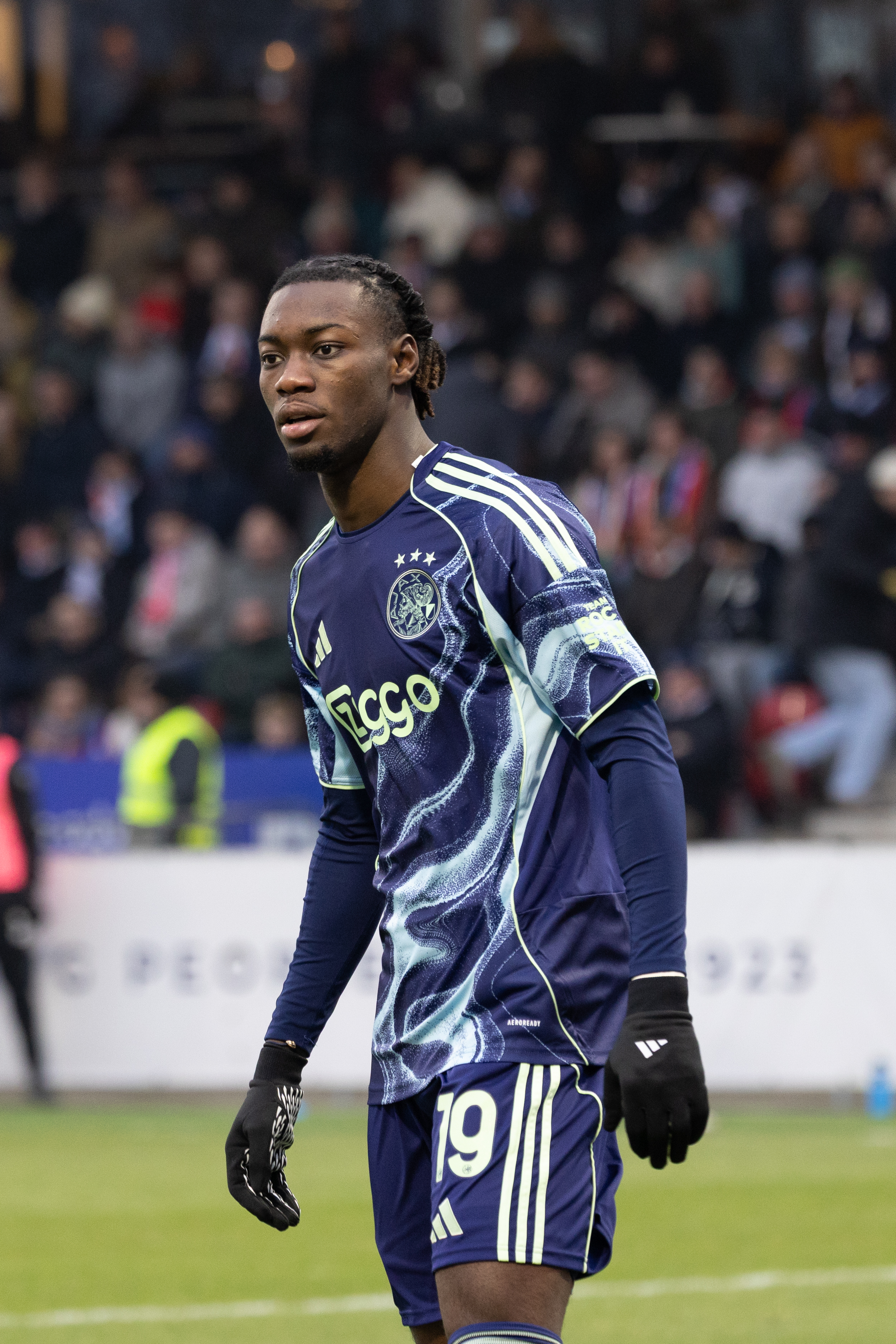

Personal information
- Full name: Don-Angelo Christoffel Annum-Assamoah Konadu
- Date of birth: 3 May 2006 (age 20)
- Place of birth: Amsterdam, Netherlands
- Height: 1.73 m (5 ft 8 in)
- Position: Forward

Team information
- Current team: Lommel (on loan from Ajax)
- Number: 9

Youth career
- 2011–2013: CTO '70
- 2013–2014: Zeeburgia
- 2014–2024: Ajax

Senior career*
Years	Team	Apps	(Gls)
2024–2025	Jong Ajax	37	(4)
2025–	Ajax	12	(0)
2026–	→ Lommel (loan)	11	(5)

International career^{‡}
2023–2024	Netherlands U18	6	(1)
2024–2025	Netherlands U19	11	(4)
2025–	Netherlands U21	3	(0)
Medal record
Men's football
Representing Netherlands
UEFA European Under-19 Championship
Winner	2025 Romania
- * Club domestic league appearances and goals as of 19 September 2026 ‡ National team caps and goals as of 14 October 2025

Don-Angelo Christoffel Annum-Assamoah Konadu (born 3 May 2006) is a Dutch professional footballer who plays as a forward for Belgian Pro League club Lommel, on loan from Eredivisie club Ajax.

== Club career ==
Konadu was born in Amsterdam and began his youth career at local amateur clubs CTO '70 and Zeeburgia. In 2014, he was recruited into the youth academy of Ajax. He progressed through the youth ranks and signed his first professional contract with the club on his 17th birthday, 3 May 2023, committing to Ajax until 2025.

Ahead of the 2024–25 season, Konadu was promoted to Jong Ajax, the club's professional second team competing in the Eerste Divisie. Following a successful integration into professional football, he extended his contract with the club on 28 October 2024, signing a new deal running until 2028.

On 23 February 2025, Konadu made his senior professional debut for the Ajax first team, appearing as a substitute in a 2–0 Eredivisie victory over Go Ahead Eagles. The following month, on 13 March 2025, he made his European debut, starting in a UEFA Europa League fixture against Eintracht Frankfurt.

During the 2025–26 season, he scored his first senior goal for Ajax on 17 December 2025 in a 7–2 KNVB Cup victory over Excelsior Maassluis. In the second half of the season, to address a shortage of available strikers, newly appointed manager Óscar García handed Konadu a start in the Eredivisie match against Sparta Rotterdam.

== International career ==
Born in the Netherlands, Konadu is of Ghanaian descent and holds dual citizenship.

He is a youth international for the Netherlands. After representing the Netherlands U18s, he was called up to the Netherlands U19 squad for their 2025 European Championship qualification campaign. In the summer of 2025, Konadu was part of the squad that won the European Under-19 Championship in Romania. Following the tournament, he was promoted to the Netherlands U21s.

== Career statistics ==
As of match played 23 July 2026

Appearances and goals by club, season and competition
Club	Season	League			National cup		Europe		Other		Total	
Club	Season	Division	Apps	Goals	Apps	Goals	Apps	Goals	Apps	Goals	Apps	Goals
Jong Ajax	2024–25	Eerste Divisie	20	1	—		—		—		20	1
Jong Ajax	2025–26	Eerste Divisie	17	3	—		—		—		17	3
Jong Ajax	Total		37	4	—		—		—		37	4
Ajax	2024–25	Eredivisie	3	0	0	0	1 (Note: Appearance in UEFA Europa League)	0	—		4	0
Ajax	2025–26	Eredivisie	9	0	1	1	1 (Note: Appearance in UEFA Champions League)	0	—		11	1
Ajax	2026–27	Eredivisie	0	0	0	0	1 (Note: Appearances in UEFA Conference League)	0	—		1	0
Ajax	Total		12	0	1	1	3	0	—		16	1
Career total			49	4	1	1	3	0	0	0	53	5

== Honours ==
Netherlands U19

- UEFA European Under-19 Championship: 2025
