= Aaron Bouwman =

Dutch footballer (born 2007)

- Bouwman with Ajax in 2026

Personal information
- Date of birth: 28 August 2007 (age 19)
- Place of birth: Haarlem, Netherlands
- Height: 1.88 m (6 ft 2 in)
- Position: Centre-back

Team information
- Current team: Ajax
- Number: 30

Youth career
- RKVV DSS
- Koninklijke HFC
- 2018–2024: Ajax

Senior career*
| Years | Team | Apps | (Gls) |
| 2024–2026 | Jong Ajax | 21 | (1) |
| 2025– | Ajax | 13 | (2) |

International career^{‡}
| 2022 | Netherlands U15 | 3 | (0) |
| 2023 | Netherlands U16 | 3 | (0) |
| 2024 | Netherlands U18 | 4 | (0) |
| 2025– | Netherlands U19 | 10 | (0) |
- * Club domestic league appearances and goals as of 18 October 2026 ‡ National team caps and goals as of 31 March 2026

Aaron Bouwman (born 28 August 2007) is a Dutch professional footballer who plays as a centre-back for Eredivisie club Ajax.

== Club career ==
=== Early career ===
Born in Haarlem, Bouwman began his footballing journey with local club RKVV DSS before moving to Koninklijke HFC. During his early years, he played as a striker. In 2018, he joined the youth academy of Ajax, where he was immediately converted into a central defender upon his arrival at De Toekomst.

=== Ajax ===
On 26 April 2024, Bouwman made his professional debut for Jong Ajax in an Eerste Divisie match against Roda JC, which ended in a 1–1 draw. Following his debut, he signed his first professional contract with the club on 30 May 2024, committing to Ajax until June 2027. Shortly after, he was selected by manager Francesco Farioli to join the senior squad for their pre-season training camp in the summer of 2024.

Bouwman continued his development with Jong Ajax during the 2024–25 season. In the summer of 2025, he was again called up to the senior team's pre-season camp. He made his competitive first-team debut during the 2025–26 season, appearing in the Eredivisie and the UEFA Champions League. Later that season, Bouwman scored his first senior goal for the club. Following his breakthrough and maiden goal, Ajax announced that Bouwman had signed a contract extension with the club.

== International career ==
Bouwman was born in the Netherlands to a Dutch father and a Jamaican-English mother. He is a youth international for the Netherlands.

In February 2022, he received his first call-up to the Netherlands U15 squad for friendly matches against Belgium. He progressed to the U16 level in October 2023, and later to the Netherlands U18 team in October 2024. By 2025, he had become a regular for the Netherlands U19 team.

== Career statistics ==
As of 22 October 2026

Appearances and goals by club, season and competition
| Club | Season | League | | | KNVB Cup | | Europe | | Other | | Total | |
| Club | Season | Division | Apps | Goals | Apps | Goals | Apps | Goals | Apps | Goals | Apps | Goals |
|---|---|---|---|---|---|---|---|---|---|---|---|---|
| Jong Ajax | 2023–24 | Eerste Divisie | 1 | 0 | — | | — | | — | | 1 | 0 |
| Jong Ajax | 2024–25 | Eerste Divisie | 14 | 0 | — | | — | | — | | 14 | 0 |
| Jong Ajax | Total | | 15 | 0 | — | | — | | — | | 15 | 0 |
| Ajax | 2025–26 | Eredivisie | 8 | 1 | 2 | 0 | 2 (Note: Appearances in UEFA Champions League) | 0 | 1 (Note: Appearance in European play-offs) | 0 | 13 | 1 |
| Ajax | 2026–27 | Eredivisie | 5 | 1 | 0 | 0 | 8 (Note: Appearances in UEFA Conference League) | 0 | — | | 13 | 1 |
| Ajax | Total | | 13 | 2 | 2 | 0 | 10 | 0 | 1 | 0 | 26 | 2 |
| Career total | | | 28 | 2 | 2 | 0 | 10 | 0 | 1 | 0 | 41 | 2 |
