= Mika Godts =

Belgian footballer (born 2005)

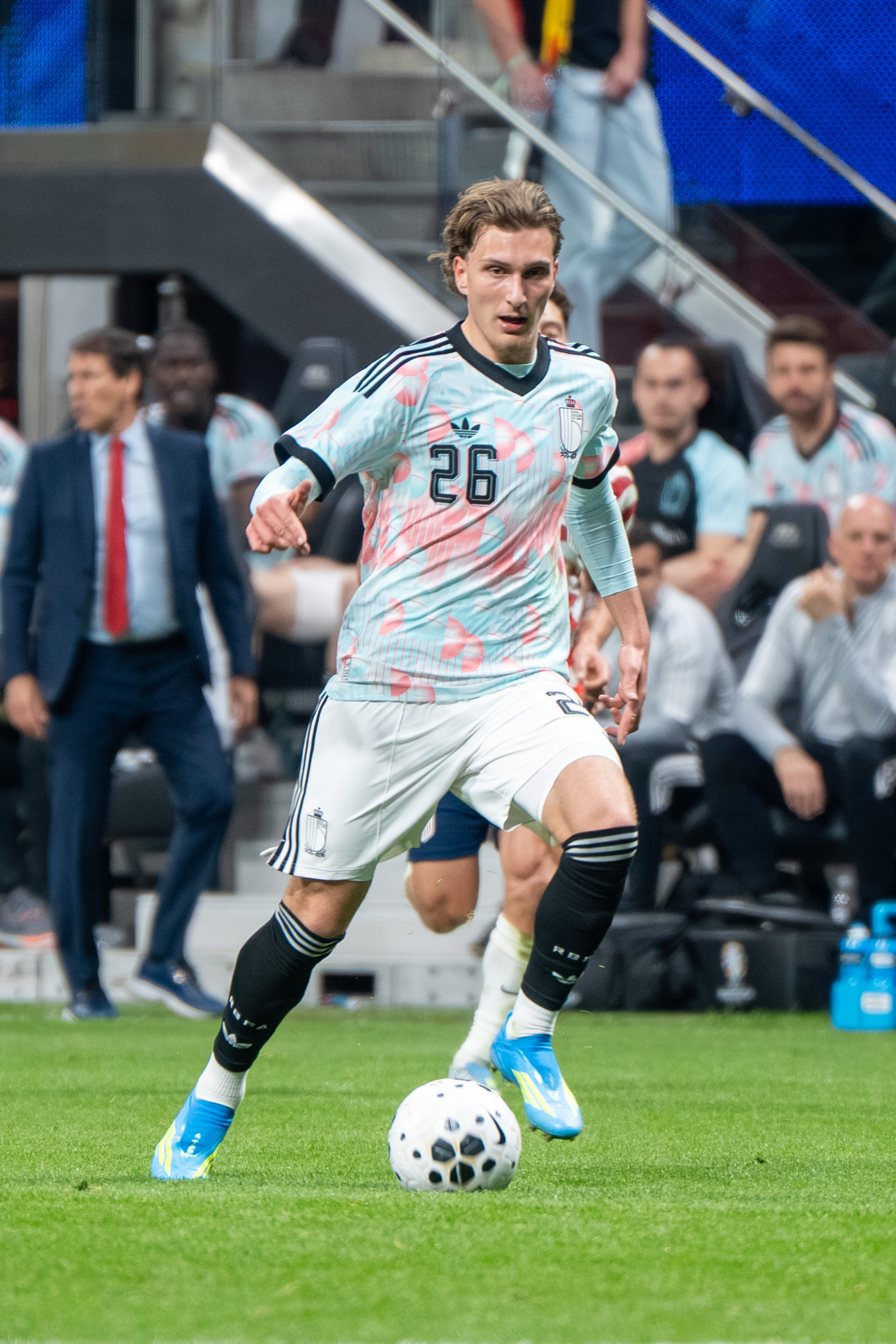
- Godts with Belgium in 2026

Personal information
- Full name: Mika Marcel Godts
- Date of birth: 7 June 2005 (age 21)
- Place of birth: Tienen, Belgium
- Height: 1.76 m (5 ft 9 in)
- Position: Left winger

Team information
- Current team: Paris Saint-Germain
- Number: 22

Youth career
- –2020: Anderlecht
- 2020–2022: Genk

Senior career*
Years	Team	Apps	(Gls)
2022–2023	Jong Genk	19	(7)
2023–2024	Jong Ajax	29	(9)
2023–2026	Ajax	78	(21)
2026–	Paris Saint-Germain	10	(2)

International career^{‡}
2020	Belgium U15	1	(0)
2021–2022	Belgium U17	8	(1)
2023	Belgium U19	7	(2)
2026–	Belgium	8	(1)
- * Club domestic league appearances and goals as of 21 November 2026 ‡ National team caps and goals as of 15 November 2026

Mika Marcel Godts (Dutch pronunciation: [ˈmikaː ˈɣɔts]; born 7 June 2005) is a Belgian professional footballer who plays as a left winger for Ligue 1 club Paris Saint-Germain and the Belgium national team.

== Early life ==
Born in Tienen, Godts began playing football at a young age. He started playing for Ksc Grimbergen where he was discovered by the youth setup of Anderlecht, where he developed his technical and tactical skills, before signing with Genk in 2020. He also represented Belgium at under-17 level for the first time in 2020.

== Club career ==
=== Genk ===
Godts progressed to Jong Genk, Genk's reserve team, competing in the Challenger Pro League. During the first half of the 2022–23 season, he made 19 appearances and scored 7 goals. As his contract approached its expiry date in June 2023, Godts indicated he did not intend to sign a new deal with Genk, attracting interest from other clubs.

=== Ajax ===
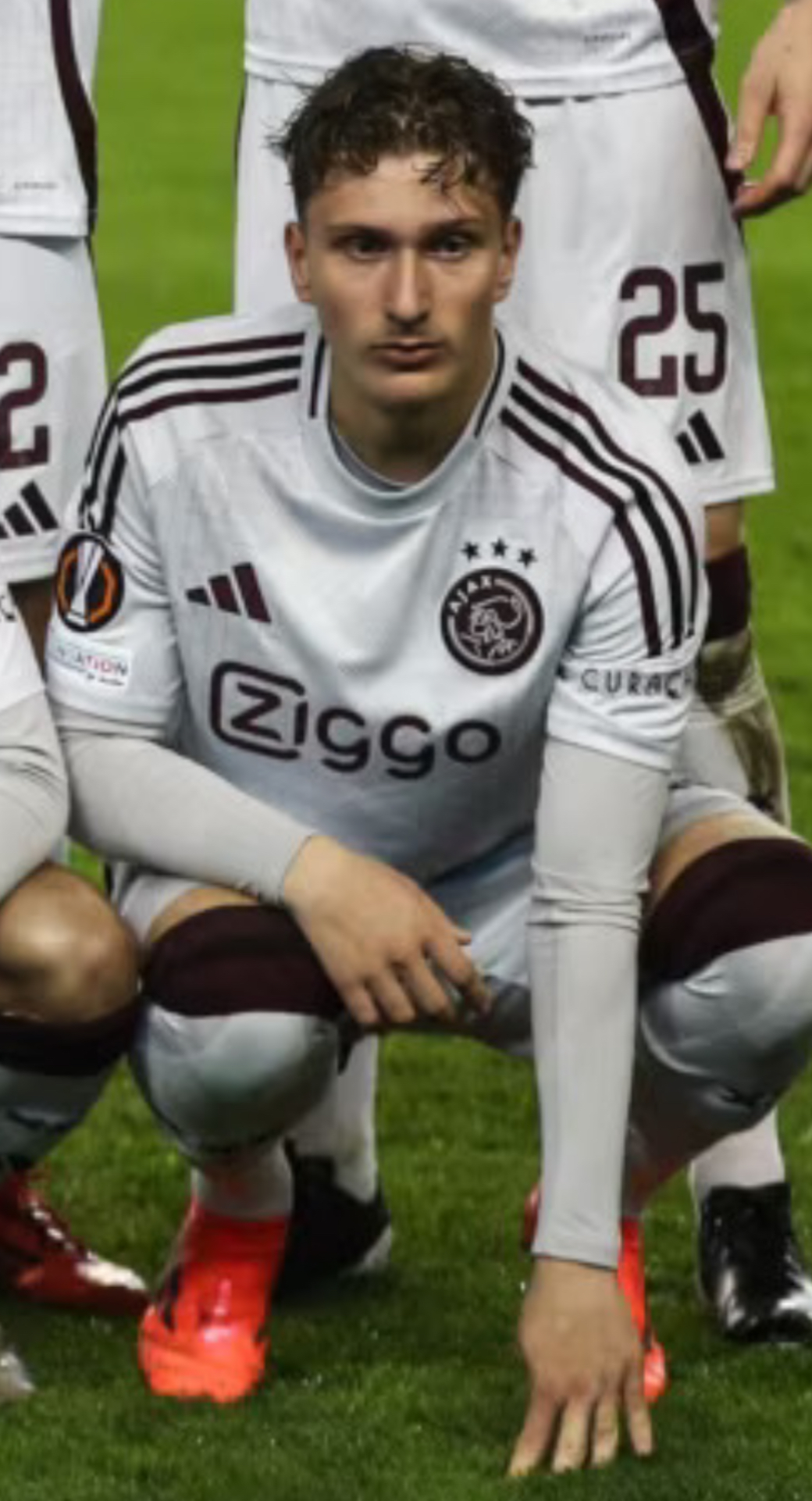
Godts lining up for Ajax in 2024

On 31 January 2023, Godts signed for Ajax on a contract until June 2025, with Ajax paying a reported fee of €1 million plus a sell-on clause. He initially joined Jong Ajax, making a goal-scoring debut on 20 February 2023 in a 4–2 Eerste Divisie home win against MVV Maastricht. His performances quickly earned him a first-team call-up, and on 9 April 2023, he made his Eredivisie debut for Ajax as a substitute in a 4–0 home win over Fortuna Sittard. Godts also featured as a substitute in the 2023 KNVB Cup final against PSV Eindhoven, scoring his penalty in the shoot-out which Ajax ultimately lost. He continued to gain experience primarily with Jong Ajax for the remainder of the 2022–23 season.

During the 2023–24 season, Godts split his time between Jong Ajax, where he scored 6 goals in 14 appearances, and the first team. His integration into the senior squad was significantly hampered by a thigh injury sustained near the start of the season, which kept him sidelined for approximately three months. Despite the setback, he made 13 Eredivisie appearances and gained his first taste of European football with 3 appearances off the bench in the UEFA Europa League.

Godts became a more integrated member of the first-team squad under manager Francesco Farioli for the 2024–25 season, often featuring as a left winger. He scored his first goals for the senior team, netting 4 times in the Eredivisie by mid-March 2025, including the opener in a 4–0 win against Heracles Almelo in February. He also scored his first European goals during the UEFA Europa League campaign, including a brace in a 4–0 home victory against Beşiktaş on 26 September 2024. His growing importance was highlighted when a hamstring injury sustained against Galatasaray in late January 2025 caused selection issues for Farioli on the left wing.

In the 2025–26 season, Godts established himself as an undisputed starter. By February 2026, he had already scored 12 goals and provided 9 assists in 21 Eredivisie appearances, becoming one of the league's most productive attackers. He also featured heavily in the club's UEFA Champions League campaign, making 8 appearances in the group stage. On 25 April 2026, he scored a goal from a solo run in a 2–0 away win over NAC Breda. After the end of the season, with Ajax having finished fifth and winning the play-offs for European football, Godts was named Johan Cruyff Talent of the Year in the Eredivisie.

=== Paris Saint-Germain ===
On 15 August 2026, Godts signed a five-year contract with Ligue 1 club Paris Saint-Germain. The transfer fee was reportedly estimated at €55m. He made his competitive debut for PSG on 23 August 2026 against Stade Rennais FC in Ligue 1.

== International career ==
Godts has represented Belgium at various youth international levels. He earned a cap for the Belgium U15 team in 2020. He was a regular for the U17 team, scoring once in 8 appearances between 2021 and 2022. He represented the U17s at the 2022 UEFA European Under-17 Championship finals tournament. In 2023, he progressed to the U19 team, scoring 2 goals in 7 appearances.

On 28 March 2026, Godts made his senior debut for Belgium as a substitute in a 5–2 friendly victory over the United States. However, he was omitted by head coach Rudi Garcia from the Belgium squad for the 2026 FIFA World Cup. On 25 September, he scored his first senior international goal, opening the scoring in Rome in a 2-0 win over Italy in the UEFA Nations League.

== Style of play ==
Godts primarily plays as a left winger but can also operate as an attacking midfielder. He is noted for his dribbling ability, pace, and close ball control, making him effective in one-on-one situations. Considered a creative player capable of driving attacks forward, taking risks, and creating goalscoring opportunities, he also possesses finishing ability. His playing style has drawn comparisons with former Belgian international Eden Hazard.

== Personal life ==
Godts married Haifa Salem Ali, a Somali-born beauty pageant winner who was crowned Miss Limburg, in June 2025.

== Career statistics ==
=== Club ===
As of match played 21 November 2026

Appearances and goals by club, season and competition
Club	Season	League			National cup (Note: Includes KNVB Cup)		Europe		Other		Total	
Club	Season	Division	Apps	Goals	Apps	Goals	Apps	Goals	Apps	Goals	Apps	Goals
Jong Genk	2022–23	Challenger Pro League	19	7	—		—		—		19	7
Jong Ajax	2022–23	Eerste Divisie	11	3	—		—		—		11	3
Jong Ajax	2023–24	Eerste Divisie	14	6	—		—		—		14	6
Jong Ajax	Total		25	9	—		—		—		25	9
Ajax	2022–23	Eredivisie	3	0	1	0	0	0	0	0	4	0
Ajax	2023–24	Eredivisie	13	0	0	0	3 (Note: Appearances in UEFA Europa League)	0	—		16	0
Ajax	2024–25	Eredivisie	29	4	2	0	16	4	—		47	8
Ajax	2025–26	Eredivisie	32	17	2	0	8 (Note: Appearances in UEFA Champions League)	0	2 (Note: Appearances in Eredivisie European play-offs)	0	44	17
Ajax	2026–27	Eredivisie	1	0	—		3 (Note: Appearances in UEFA Conference League)	1	—		4	1
Ajax	Total		78	21	5	0	30	5	2	0	115	26
Paris Saint-Germain	2026–27	Ligue 1	10	2	0	0	2	0	0	0	12	2
Career total			132	39	5	0	32	5	2	0	171	44

=== International ===
As of match played 15 November 2026

Appearances and goals by national team and year
National team	Year	Apps	Goals
Belgium	2026	8	1
Total		8	1

As of match played 25 September 2026

List of international goals scored by Mika Godts
No.	Date	Venue	Cap	Opponent	Score	Result	Competition	Ref.
1	25 September 2026	Stadio Olimpico, Rome, Italy	3	Italy	1–0	2–0	2026–27 UEFA Nations League A	

== Honours ==
Individual

- Eredivisie Talent of the Month: November 2025, February 2026, April 2026
- Eredivisie Talent of the Year: 2025–26
- Eredivisie Team of the Season:2025–26
