= 2025–26 AFC Ajax season =

Dutch football club season

AFC Ajax
2025–26 season
- Owner: AFC Ajax N.V. (Euronext Amsterdam: AJAX)
- CEO: Menno Geelen
- Head coach: John Heitinga (until 6 November 2025); Fred Grim (caretaker, until 8 March 2026); Óscar García (caretaker, from 8 March 2026)
- Stadium: Johan Cruyff Arena
- Eredivisie: 5th
- Eredivisie European competition play-offs: Winners
- KNVB Cup: Round of 16
- UEFA Champions League: League phase
- Top goalscorer: League: Mika Godts (17); All: Mika Godts (17)
- Highest home attendance: 55,865 (vs NAC Breda, 27 September 2025; Eredivisie)
- Lowest home attendance: 47,506 (vs Feyenoord, 14 December 2025; Eredivisie)
- Average home league attendance: 50,382
- Biggest win: 7–2 (vs Excelsior (A); 17 December 2025; KNVB Cup)
- Biggest defeat: 0–6 (vs AZ (A); 14 January 2026; KNVB Cup)
Home colours	Away colours	Third colours

The 2025–26 season was the 126th season in the history of Ajax, and their 70th consecutive season in the Dutch top flight. The club participated in the Eredivisie, KNVB Cup and UEFA Champions League.

== Players ==
=== Squad ===
As of 2 February 2026

Note: Flags indicate national team as defined under FIFA eligibility rules; some limited exceptions apply. Players may hold more than one non-FIFA nationality.

No.	Pos.	Nation	Player
1	GK	CZE	Vítězslav Jaroš (on loan from Liverpool)
2	DF	BRA	Lucas Rosa
3	DF	DEN	Anton Gaaei
4	DF	JPN	Ko Itakura
5	DF	NED	Owen Wijndal
6	MF	NED	Youri Regeer
7	FW	ARG	Maher Carrizo
9	FW	DEN	Kasper Dolberg
10	MF	ISR	Oscar Gloukh
11	MF	BEL	Mika Godts
12	GK	NED	Joeri Heerkens
15	DF	NED	Youri Baas
17	MF	NOR	Oliver Edvardsen
18	MF	NED	Davy Klaassen (vice-captain)

No.	Pos.	Nation	Player
19	FW	NED	Don-Angelo Konadu
23	MF	NED	Steven Berghuis (third captain)
24	MF	BEL	Jorthy Mokio
25	FW	NED	Wout Weghorst
26	GK	IDN	Maarten Paes
27	FW	SWE	Maximilian Ibrahimović (on loan from Milan)
28	MF	NED	Kian Fitz-Jim
30	DF	NED	Aaron Bouwman
32	DF	JPN	Takehiro Tomiyasu
37	DF	CRO	Josip Šutalo
43	MF	BEL	Rayane Bounida
47	DF	UKR	Oleksandr Zinchenko
48	MF	NED	Sean Steur

== Transfers ==
=== In ===
Date	Pos.	Player	Transferred from	Fee	Ref.
15 July 2025	FW	(Spain) Raúl Moro	(Spain) Real Valladolid	€11,000,000	
28 July 2025	GK	(Netherlands) Joeri Heerkens	(Czech Republic) Sparta Praha	€2,000,000	
1 August 2025	MF	(Israel) Oscar Gloukh	(Austria) Red Bull Salzburg	€14,750,000 (Note: Fee may eventually rise to €17,250,000 due to bonuses.)	
8 August 2025	DF	(Japan) Ko Itakura	(Germany) Borussia Mönchengladbach	€10,500,000	
2 September 2025	FW	(Denmark) Kasper Dolberg	(Belgium) Anderlecht	€10,000,000	
16 December 2025	DF	(Japan) Takehiro Tomiyasu	Unattached (Note: Most recently played for Arsenal.)	Free transfer	
1 February 2026	DF	(Ukraine) Oleksandr Zinchenko	(England) Arsenal	€1,500,000	
2 February 2026	GK	(Indonesia) Maarten Paes	(United States) FC Dallas	€1,500,000	
3 February 2026	FW	(Argentina) Maher Carrizo	(Argentina) Vélez Sarsfield	€5,950,000	

=== Out ===
Date	Pos.	Player	Transferred to	Fee	Ref.
25 June 2025	DF	(Croatia) Jakov Medić	(England) Norwich City	€2,000,000	
27 June 2025	DF	(Netherlands) Precious Ugwu	(Netherlands) Volendam	Undisclosed	
8 July 2025	MF	(Iceland) Kristian Hlynsson	(Netherlands) Twente	€1,800,000	
10 July 2025	MF	(England) Jordan Henderson	(England) Brentford	Free transfer	
10 July 2025	FW	(Denmark) Christian Rasmussen	(Germany) Fortuna Düsseldorf	€1,500,000	
11 July 2025	DF	(Croatia) Borna Sosa	(England) Crystal Palace	€2,300,000	
17 July 2025	FW	(Portugal) Carlos Forbs	(Belgium) Club Brugge	€6,000,000	
23 July 2025	GK	(Netherlands) Jay Gorter	(Cyprus) Pafos	Free transfer	
3 August 2025	DF	(Netherlands) Jorrel Hato	(England) Chelsea	€44,180,000	
1 September 2025	FW	(Netherlands) Brian Brobbey	(England) Sunderland	€20,000,000	
1 September 2025	FW	(Burkina Faso) Bertrand Traoré	(England) Sunderland	€2,500,000	
9 January 2026	MF	(Netherlands) Kenneth Taylor	(Italy) Lazio	€16,850,000	
19 January 2026	MF	(Denmark) Lasse Abildgaard	(Netherlands) Willem II	Undisclosed	
22 January 2026	FW	(Spain) Raúl Moro	(Spain) Osasuna	€5,000,000	
22 January 2026	MF	(Netherlands) Nassef Chourak	(Sweden) Kalmar FF	Undisclosed	
29 January 2026	GK	(Netherlands) Remko Pasveer	(Netherlands) Heracles	Free transfer	

=== Loans in ===
Start date	Pos.	Player	From	End date	Fee	Ref.
18 June 2025	GK	(Czech Republic) Vítězslav Jaroš	(England) Liverpool	30 June 2026	Free	
29 August 2025	MF	(England) James McConnell	(England) Liverpool	9 January 2026 (Note: Originally loan agreed until 30 June 2026, but terminated earlier due to McConnell's recall from Liverpool.)	€1,500,000	
14 January 2026	MF	(Sweden) Maximilian Ibrahimović	(Italy) AC Milan	30 June 2026	Undisclosed	

=== Loans out ===
Date	Pos.	Player	To	End date	Fee	Ref.
22 June 2025	FW	(Netherlands) Julian Rijkhoff	(Netherlands) Almere City	30 June 2026	Free	
15 July 2025	FW	(Netherlands) Amourricho van Axel Dongen	(Netherlands) Heerenveen	30 June 2026	Free	
10 August 2025	FW	(England) Chuba Akpom	(England) Ipswich Town	30 June 2026	Free	
11 August 2025	DF	(Netherlands) Nick Verschuren	(Netherlands) Volendam	30 June 2026	Free	
19 August 2025	DF	(Netherlands) Dies Janse	(Netherlands) Groningen	30 June 2026	Free	
20 August 2025	MF	(Norway) Sivert Mannsverk	(Czech Republic) Sparta Prague	30 June 2026	Free	
29 August 2025	DF	(Turkey) Ahmetcan Kaplan	(Netherlands) NEC	30 June 2026	Free	
29 August 2025	MF	(Poland) Jan Faberski	(Netherlands) PEC Zwolle	30 June 2026	Free	
29 August 2025	DF	(Netherlands) Tristan Gooijer	(Netherlands) PEC Zwolle	30 June 2026	Free	
9 January 2026	DF	(Argentina) Gastón Ávila	(Argentina) Rosario Central	31 December 2026	Free	
22 January 2026	MF	(Netherlands) Branco van den Boomen	(France) Angers	30 June 2026	Free	
2 February 2026	GK	(England) Charlie Setford	(England) Milton Keynes Dons	30 June 2026	Free	

== Pre-season and friendlies ==
Win Draw Loss Cancelled/ Susp. Fixtures

=== Pre-season ===
5 July 2025 Friendly	Ajax (Netherlands)	6–3	(Scotland) Hibernian	Ouder-Amstel, Netherlands
13:00 CEST (UTC+2)	Berghuis 8', 12'; Godts 21', 33'; Fitz-Jim 34'; Kaplan 53'	Report	Boyle 16'; Hoilett 70'; Bowie 84'	Stadium: Sportpark De Toekomst; Attendance: Behind closed doors

12 July 2025 Friendly	Ajax (Netherlands)	1–1	(Denmark) Aarhus	Hattem, Netherlands
15:00 CEST (UTC+2)	Steur 52'	Report	Tchamche 63'	Stadium: Sportpark 't Achterveen

16 July 2025 Friendly	Ajax (Netherlands)	2–1	(Greece) PAOK	Ouder-Amstel, Netherlands
14:00 CEST (UTC+2)	Berghuis 29'; Bataoulas 71' (o.g.)	Report	Mythou 74'	Stadium: Sportpark De Toekomst; Attendance: Behind closed doors

19 July 2025 Friendly	Ajax (Netherlands)	3–2	(Belgium) Mechelen	Oldebroek, Netherlands
14:30 CEST (UTC+2)	Klaassen 24'; Gaaei 80'; Edvardsen 82'	Report	Marsà 18'; Raman 120'	Stadium: Sportpark Bovenmolen
Note: Two halves of 60 minutes

24 July 2025 Como Cup	Ajax (Netherlands)	5–1	(Scotland) Celtic	Como, Italy
20:30 CEST (UTC+2)	Berghuis 16'; Klaassen 47'; Berghuis 59'; Bouwman 74'; Bounida 83'	Report	Yang 21'	Stadium: Stadio Giuseppe Sinigaglia

27 July 2025 Como Cup	Ajax (Netherlands)	0–3	(Italy) Como	Como, Italy
20:00 CEST (UTC+2)		Report	Paz 26' (pen.); Baturina 46'; Douvikas 64' (pen.)	Stadium: Stadio Giuseppe Sinigaglia

3 August 2025 Friendly	Ajax (Netherlands)	2–2	(France) Monaco	Amsterdam, Netherlands
14:00 CEST (UTC+2)	Taylor 29'; Traoré 87'	Report	Biereth 34'; Minamino 65'	Stadium: Johan Cruyff Arena; Attendance: 52,705

=== Mid-season ===
5 January 2026 Friendly	Ajax (Netherlands)	4−0	(Belgium) RFC Seraing	Amsterdam, Netherlands
14:00 CET (UTC+1)	Steur 2'; Konadu 37'; Taylor 51'; Godts 65'	Report		Stadium: Johan Cruyff Arena; Attendance: Behind closed doors

=== On-season (spring) ===
25 March 2026 Friendly	Ajax (Netherlands)	2–2	(Netherlands) FC Volendam	Duivendrecht, Netherlands
11:30 CET (UTC+1)	Carrizo 56'; Edvardsen 83'	Report	Yah 15'; Mühren 58'	Stadium: Sportpark De Toekomst; Attendance: Behind closed doors

16 April 2026 Friendly	Ajax (Netherlands)	0−1	(Netherlands) FC Twente	Duivendrecht, Netherlands
14:00 CEST (UTC+2)		Report	Weidmann 83'	Stadium: Sportpark De Toekomst; Attendance: Behind closed doors

== Competitions ==
=== Overall record ===
Competition	First match	Last match	Starting round	Final position	Record							
Competition	First match	Last match	Starting round	Final position	Pld	W	D	L	GF	GA	GD	Win %
Eredivisie	10 August 2025	17 May 2026	Matchday 1	5th	34	14	14	6	62	41	+21	41.18
Eredivisie European competition play-offs	21 May 2026	24 May 2026	Semi-finals	Winners	2	1	1	0	3	1	+2	50.00
KNVB Cup	17 December 2025	14 January 2026	Second round	Round of 16	2	1	0	1	7	8	−1	50.00
UEFA Champions League	17 September 2025	28 January 2026	League phase	League phase	8	2	0	6	8	21	−13	25.00
Total					46	18	15	13	80	71	+9	39.13

Source: Soccerway

=== Eredivisie ===
==== League table ====
Pos	Team	Pld	W	D	L	GF	GA	GD	Pts	Qualification or relegation
3	NEC	34	16	11	7	77	53	+24	59	Qualification for the Champions League third qualifying round
4	Twente	34	15	13	6	59	40	+19	58	Qualification for the Europa League second qualifying round
5	Ajax (O)	34	14	14	6	62	41	+21	56	Qualification for the European competition play-offs
6	Utrecht	34	15	8	11	55	42	+13	53	Qualification for the European competition play-offs
7	AZ	34	14	10	10	58	51	+7	52	Qualification for the Europa League league phase (Note: Qualified for the Europa League league phase as the 2025–26 KNVB Cup winners.)

Source: Eredivisie
Rules for classification: At end of season: 1) Points; 2) Goal difference; 3) Goals scored; 4) Head-to-head points; 5) Head-to-head goal difference; 6) Head-to-head goals scored; 7) Head-to-head away goals scored; 8) Play-off match or matches; 9) Penalty shoot-out (if the play-off match or matches end in a draw)
(O) Play-off winners

==== Results summary ====
Overall								Home						Away					
Pld	W	D	L	GF	GA	GD	Pts	W	D	L	GF	GA	GD	W	D	L	GF	GA	GD
34	14	14	6	62	41	+21	56	9	4	4	32	17	+15	5	10	2	30	24	+6

Source: Eredivisie

==== Results by round ====
Round	1	2	3	4	5	6	7	8	9	10	11	12	13	14	15	16	17	18	19	20	21	22	23	24	25	26	27	28	29	30	31	32	33	34
Ground	H	A	H	A	H	A	H	A	H	A	H	A	H	H	A	H	A	A	H	H	A	A	H	H	A	A	H	A	H	A	A	H	H	A
Result	W	D	W	D	W	D	W	D	L	W	D	L	L	W	W	W	D	W	D	W	D	D	W	D	D	L	W	D	L	W	W	D	L	D
Position	5	6	3	5	3	3	3	3	4	4	4	4	6	5	4	3	3	3	3	3	4	4	4	4	3	5	4	4	5	5	4	4	5	5

Source: Eredivisie
A = Away; H = Home; W = Win; D = Draw; L = Loss

==== Matches ====
The league fixtures were announced on 18 June 2025.

10 August 2025 1	Ajax	2–0	Telstar	Amsterdam
14:30 CEST (UTC+2)	Weghorst 19', 83'	Report		Stadium: Johan Cruyff Arena; Attendance: 54,665; Referee: Jannick van der Laan

17 August 2025 2	Go Ahead Eagles	2–2	Ajax	Deventer
12:15 CEST (UTC+2)	Meulensteen 21'; Edvardsen (yellow card) 22'; Linthorst 44'	Report	Klaassen 3'; Weghorst (yellow card) 34'; Baas 45+3'; Taylor (yellow card) 76'	Stadium: De Adelaarshorst; Attendance: 9,997; Referee: Danny Makkelie

24 August 2025 3	Ajax	2–0	Heracles	Amsterdam
16:45 CEST (UTC+2)	Berghuis 31'; Weghorst 87'	Report	Mirani (yellow card) 22'; Žambůrek (yellow card) 70'	Stadium: Johan Cruyff Arena; Attendance: 54,683; Referee: Marc Nagtegaal

30 August 2025 4	Volendam	1–1	Ajax	Volendam
16:30 CEST (UTC+2)	Veerman 16'; Descotte (yellow card) 83'; Leliendal (yellow card) 90+7'	Report	Moro (yellow card) 23'; Itakura 61'; Weghorst (yellow card) 79'; Rosa (yellow card) 87'	Stadium: Kras Stadion; Attendance: 6,864; Referee: Alex Bos

13 September 2025 5	Ajax	3–1	PEC Zwolle	Amsterdam
16:30 CEST (UTC+2)	Klaassen 18'; Regeer (yellow card) 23'; Godts 37', 86'; Wijndal (yellow card) 56'	Report	Thomas (yellow card) 64'; De Rooij 69'	Stadium: Johan Cruyff Arena; Attendance: 54,081; Referee: Sander van der Eijk

21 September 2025 6	PSV	2–2	Ajax	Eindhoven
14:30 CEST (UTC+2)	Saibari 7'; Perišić (yellow card) 21'; Gąsiorowski 81'; Veerman (yellow card) 88'	Report	Wijndal (yellow card) 18'; Taylor 31' (pen.), (yellow card) 72'; Regeer (yellow card) 49'; Edvardsen (yellow card) 65'; Gloukh 88'; Fitz-Jim (yellow card) 90+2'	Stadium: Philips Stadion; Attendance: 35,700; Referee: Serdar Gözübüyük

27 September 2025 7	Ajax	2–1	NAC Breda	Amsterdam
16:30 CEST (UTC+2)	Gloukh 4'; Itakura (yellow card) 40'; Edvardsen (yellow card) 45+3'; Taylor 46'	Report	Van Hooijdonk 16' (pen.); Hillen (yellow card) 39'; Nassoh (yellow card) 41'; Balard (yellow card) 64' (yellow-red card) 71'	Stadium: Johan Cruyff Arena; Attendance: 55,865; Referee: Marc Nagtegaal

4 October 2025 8	Sparta Rotterdam	3–3	Ajax	Rotterdam
16:30 CEST (UTC+2)	Baas (yellow card) 45'; Lauritsen 45+3'; Van Bergen 52'; Kitolano 55'	Report	Weghorst 42', 73'; Fitz-Jim (yellow card) 45+5'; Godts (yellow card) 74'; Gloukh 90+7', (yellow card) 90+9'	Stadium: Sparta Stadion Het Kasteel; Attendance: 10,599; Referee: Bas Nijhuis

18 October 2025 9	Ajax	0–2	AZ	Amsterdam
21:00 CEST (UTC+2)	Gaaei (yellow card) 52'; Klaassen (yellow card) 59'; Baas (yellow card) 72'; Weghorst (yellow card) 89'	Report	De Wit (yellow card) 21'; Patati 25'; Parrott 42' (pen.); Koopmeiners (yellow card) 83'	Stadium: Johan Cruyff Arena; Attendance: 54,274; Referee: Jeroen Manschot

26 October 2025 10	Twente	2–3	Ajax	Enschede
12:15 CET (UTC+1)	Hlynsson 4'; Van Wolfswinkel 64' (pen.)	Report	Weghorst 49'; Gloukh 51', (yellow card) 89'; Godts 56'; Taylor (yellow card) 90+1'	Stadium: De Grolsch Veste; Attendance: 30,000; Referee: Serdar Gözübüyük

1 November 2025 11	Ajax	1–1	Heerenveen	Amsterdam
16:30 CET (UTC+1)	Godts 38'	Report	Sejk 68'; Van Overeem (yellow card) 83'; Rivera (yellow card) 90+4'	Stadium: Johan Cruyff Arena; Attendance: 54,283; Referee: Jannick van der Laan

9 November 2025 12	Utrecht	2–1	Ajax	Utrecht
12:15 CET (UTC+1)	Didden 45+1'; Haller 54'; Horemans (yellow card) 85'	Report	Godts 56'	Stadium: Stadion Galgenwaard; Attendance: 22,944; Referee: Danny Makkelie

22 November 2025 13	Ajax	1–2	Excelsior	Amsterdam
18:45 CET (UTC+1)	Weghorst (yellow card) 16'; Šutalo (yellow card) 57'; Dolberg 59'	Report	Bronkhorst (yellow card) 24'; Naujoks 37', 47'	Stadium: Johan Cruyff Arena; Attendance: 54,484; Referee: Joey Kooij

2 December 2025 14	Ajax	2–0	Groningen	Amsterdam
14:30 CET (UTC+1)	Godts 28'; Bouwman 60', (yellow card) 64'	Report		Stadium: Johan Cruyff Arena; Attendance: 0 Referee: Bas Nijhuis
Note: The game was originally scheduled for 30 November, but it could not start because the Ajax ultras threw multiple fireworks on the pitch. The game was played on 2 December behind closed doors.

6 December 2025 15	Fortuna Sittard	1–3	Ajax	Sittard
18:45 CET (UTC+1)	Sierhuis 4', (yellow card) 55'; Pinto (yellow card) 30'; Hubner (red card) 53'; Fosso (yellow card) 78'	Report	Bounida (yellow card) 22'; Van Ottele 45+6' (o.g.); Fosso 47' (o.g.); Baas (yellow card) 49' (yellow-red card) 60'; Wijndal 52'; Jaroš (yellow card) 86'	Stadium: Fortuna Sittard Stadion; Attendance: 11,920; Referee: Sander van der Eijk

14 December 2025 16	Ajax	2–0	Feyenoord	Amsterdam
14:30 CET (UTC+1)	Klaassen 13'; Bouwman (yellow card) 28'; Wijndal (yellow card) 33'; Mokio 90+4'	Report	Hadj Moussa (yellow card) 33'	Stadium: Johan Cruyff Arena; Attendance: 47,506; Referee: Serdar Gözübüyük

20 December 2025 17	NEC	2–2	Ajax	Nijmegen
20:00 CET (UTC+1)	Linssen 3', (yellow card) 11'; Ouaissa 46', (red card) 59'; Crettaz (yellow card) 90+4'; Kaplan (yellow card) 90+5'	Report	Dolberg 38'; Godts 44', (yellow card) 88'; Bounida (yellow card) 77'; Regeer (yellow card) 90+3'	Stadium: Goffertstadion; Attendance: 12,650; Referee: Allard Lindhout

11 January 2026 18	Telstar	2–3	Ajax	Velsen
14:30 CET (UTC+1)	Hatenboer (red card) 53'; Lechkar (yellow card) 64'; Baas 78' (o.g.); Bakker 84'	Report	Gloukh 11'; Godts 14'; Baas 72'; Dolberg (yellow card) 74'	Stadium: 711 Stadion; Attendance: 5,290; Referee: Jeroen Manschot

17 January 2026 19	Ajax	2–2	Go Ahead Eagles	Amsterdam
16:30 CET (UTC+1)	Klaassen 15'; Dolberg 28'; Gaaei (yellow card) 77'; Regeer (yellow card) 78'	Report	Goudmijn (yellow card) 19'; Smit (yellow card) 39', (goal) 66'; Baeten 53'; Kramer (yellow card) 63'; Linthorst (yellow card) 72'	Stadium: Johan Cruyff Arena; Attendance: 53,979; Referee: Serdar Gözübüyük

24 January 2026 20	Ajax	2–0	Volendam	Amsterdam
16:30 CET (UTC+1)	Baas 13', 36'; Rosa (yellow card) 82'	Report	Kuwas (yellow card) 59'; Leliendal (yellow card) 67'; Ideho (yellow card) 82'	Stadium: Johan Cruyff Arena; Attendance: 54,715; Referee: Jannick van der Laan

1 February 2026 21	Excelsior	2–2	Ajax	Rotterdam
12:15 CET (UTC+1)	Schouten (yellow card) 70'; Jonathans 74'; Zagré 79'	Report	Godts 21', 40'	Stadium: Van Donge & De Roo Stadion; Attendance: 4,500; Referee: Marc Nagtegaal

8 February 2026 22	AZ	1–1	Ajax	Alkmaar
14:30 CET (UTC+1)	Goes 52'; Koopmeiners (yellow card) 55'; De Wit (yellow card) 59'; Sadiq (yellow card) 90+5'	Report	Fitz-Jim 90+3'	Stadium: AFAS Stadion; Attendance: 18,736; Referee: Danny Makkelie

14 February 2026 23	Ajax	4–1	Fortuna Sittard	Amsterdam
20:00 CET (UTC+1)	Mokio 7'; Bounida 14'; Godts 24', 81'	Report	Šutalo 45' (o.g.)	Stadium: Johan Cruyff Arena; Attendance: 54,160; Referee: Rob Dieperink

21 February 2026 24	Ajax	1–1	NEC	Amsterdam
21:00 CET (UTC+1)	Bounida (yellow card) 23'; Godts 39'	Report	Nejašmić 57'; Lebreton (yellow card) 63'	Stadium: Johan Cruyff Arena; Attendance: 53,583; Referee: Jeroen Manschot

1 March 2026 25	PEC Zwolle	0–0	Ajax	Zwolle
12:15 CET (UTC+1)	Thomas (yellow card) 28'; Graves (yellow card) 66'; Floranus (yellow card) 86'	Report	Berghuis (yellow card) 78'; Regeer (yellow card) 87'	Stadium: MAC³PARK Stadion; Attendance: 14,000; Referee: Sander van der Eijk

7 March 2026 26	Groningen	3–1	Ajax	Groningen
16:30 CEST (UTC+1)	Van Bergen 6'; Zawada 65', 72'; Blokzijl (yellow card) 90+6'	Report	Klaassen 30'; Weghorst (yellow card) 90+4'	Stadium: Euroborg; Attendance: 22,525; Referee: Serdar Gözübüyük

14 March 2026 27	Ajax	4–0	Sparta Rotterdam	Amsterdam
21:00 CET (UTC+1)	Kitolano 20' (o.g.); Berghuis 33'; Klaassen 74'; Godts 77'	Report	Sambo (yellow card) 55'; Martins Indi (yellow card) 75'	Stadium: Johan Cruyff Arena; Attendance: 48,506; Referee: Rob Dieperink

22 March 2026 28	Feyenoord	1–1	Ajax	Rotterdam
14:30 CET (UTC+1)	Hadj Moussa (yellow card) 73'; Moder 84' (pen.)	Report	Steur 54'; Baas (yellow card) 60'; Bounida (yellow card) 79'; Rosa (yellow card) 84'	Stadium: De Kuip; Attendance: 47,500; Referee: Danny Makkelie

4 April 2026 29	Ajax	1–2	Twente	Amsterdam
21:00 CEST (UTC+2)	Weghorst 33'; Edvardsen (yellow card) 41'; Gaaei (yellow card) 55'; Gloukh (yellow card) 63'; Berghuis (yellow card) 70'	Report	Zerrouki 18'; Rots (yellow card) 61'; Lemkin (yellow card) 64'; Van Rooij 80'	Stadium: Johan Cruyff Arena; Attendance: 53,634; Referee: Sander van der Eijk

11 April 2026 30	Heracles	0–3	Ajax	Almelo
21:00 CEST (UTC+2)	Ould-Chikh (yellow card) 74'; Van Hoorenbeeck (yellow card) 87'	Report	Godts 16'; Berghuis 17', 47'; Tomiyasu (red card) 81'	Stadium: Asito Stadion; Attendance: 12,103; Referee: Martin van den Kerkhof

25 April 2026 31	NAC Breda	0–2	Ajax	Breda
20:00 CEST (UTC+2)		Report	Gloukh 20'; Godts 41'; Itakura (yellow card) 78'; Weghorst (yellow card) 85'	Stadium: Rat Verlegh Stadion; Attendance: 20,191; Referee: Serdar Gözübüyük

2 May 2026 32	Ajax	2–2	PSV	Amsterdam
20:00 CEST (UTC+2)	Gaaei 10'; Steur (yellow card) 74'; Godts 90+1'	Report	Pepi 1'; Boadu 76'; Driouech (yellow card) 82'; Man (yellow card) 87'	Stadium: Johan Cruyff Arena; Attendance: 54,439; Referee: Allard Lindhout

10 May 2026 33	Ajax	1–2	Utrecht	Amsterdam
16:45 CEST (UTC+2)	Berghuis (yellow card) 4'; Weghorst 84'; Steur (yellow card) 88'	Report	Karlsson (yellow card) 15'; De Wit (yellow card) 38'; Vesterlund 81'; Van der Hoorn 90+6'	Stadium: Johan Cruyff Arena; Attendance: 53,632; Referee: Jeroen Manschot

17 May 2026 34	Heerenveen	0–0	Ajax	Heerenveen
14:30 CEST (UTC+2)		Report	Mokio (yellow card) 25'; Rosa (yellow card) 57'; Regeer (yellow card) 69'	Stadium: Abe Lenstra Stadion; Attendance: 25,450; Referee: Joey Kooij

=== Eredivisie European competition play-offs ===
21 May 2026 Semi-finals	Ajax	2–0	Groningen	Volendam
18:45 CEST (UTC+2)	Klaassen 23'; Mokio 56'; Godts (yellow card) 64'	Report	Peersman (yellow card) 39'; Janse (yellow card) 59'; Willumsson (yellow card) 90+2'; Seuntjens (yellow card) 90+2'	Stadium: Kras Stadion; Attendance: 6,776; Referee: Marc Nagtegaal

24 May 2026 Final	Ajax	1–1 (a.e.t.) (4–3 p)	Utrecht	Volendam
12:15 CEST (UTC+2)	Klaassen 96', (yellow card) 120'; Weghorst (yellow card) 108'	Report	El Arguioui (yellow card) 90+4'; Zechiël 106'	Stadium: Kras Stadion; Attendance: 5,300; Referee: Allard Lindhout
	Penalties
	Klaassen (penalty scored); Weghorst (penalty scored); Godts (penalty scored); Gaaei (penalty scored)		(penalty missed) Haller; (penalty scored) El Arguioui; (penalty scored) Zechiël; (penalty scored) Blake; (penalty missed) El Karouani

=== KNVB Cup ===
17 December 2025 Second round	Excelsior	2–7	Ajax	Maassluis
18:45 CET (UTC+1)	Van Eerden (yellow card) 25'; Plank 53'; Verbont 60'; Al Hamd (yellow card) 77'	Report	Wijndal 12'; Gaaei 19', (yellow card) 62'; Konadu 24'; Mokio 40', 48'; Bounida 56'; Moro 65'	Stadium: Sportpark Dijkpolder; Attendance: 4,700; Referee: Martijn Vos

14 January 2026 Round of 16	AZ	6–0	Ajax	Alkmaar
21:00 CET (UTC+1)	Parrott 2', 33', 80'; Chávez (yellow card) 16'; Koopmeiners 45+1'; Smit 47'; Sadiq 88'	Report	Godts (yellow card) 4'; Wijndal (red card) 66'	Stadium: AFAS Stadion; Attendance: 15,588; Referee: Bas Nijhuis

=== UEFA Champions League ===
==== League phase ====
The draw for the league phase was held on 28 August 2025.

Pos	Team	Pld	W	D	L	GF	GA	GD	Pts
30	(Italian Football Federation) Napoli	8	2	2	4	9	15	−6	8
31	(Danish Football Association) Copenhagen	8	2	2	4	12	21	−9	8
32	(Royal Dutch Football Association) Ajax	8	2	0	6	8	21	−13	6
33	(German Football Association) Eintracht Frankfurt	8	1	1	6	10	21	−11	4
34	(Football Association of the Czech Republic) Slavia Prague	8	0	3	5	5	19	−14	3

Source: UEFA
Rules for classification: League phase tiebreakers

Round	1	2	3	4	5	6	7	8
Ground	H	A	A	H	H	A	A	H
Result	L	L	L	L	L	W	W	L
Position	30	35	36	36	36	34	32	32

Source: UEFA
A = Away; H = Home; W = Win; D = Draw; L = Loss

17 September 2025 1	Ajax (Netherlands)	0–2	(Italy) Inter Milan	Amsterdam, Netherlands
21:00 CEST (UTC+2)	Baas (yellow card) 73'	Report	Thuram (yellow card) 17', (goal) 42', 47'; Mkhitaryan (yellow card) 67'	Stadium: Johan Cruyff Arena; Attendance: 52,288; Referee: Michael Oliver (England)

30 September 2025 2	Marseille (France)	4–0	(Netherlands) Ajax	Marseille, France
21:00 CEST (UTC+2)	Paixão 6', 12'; Greenwood 26'; Aubameyang 52'; Højbjerg (yellow card) 79'; Aguerd (yellow card) 88'	Report	Lucas Rosa (yellow card) 34'; Itakura (yellow card) 66'; Gaaei (yellow card) 76'	Stadium: Stade Vélodrome; Attendance: 65,771; Referee: Anthony Taylor (England)

22 October 2025 3	Chelsea (England)	5–1	(Netherlands) Ajax	London, England
21:00 CEST (UTC+2)	Guiu 18'; Šutalo 27' (o.g.); Adarabioyo (yellow card) 31'; Fernández 45' (pen.); Estêvão 45+6' (pen.), (yellow card) 56'; George 48'	Report	Taylor (red card) 17'; Weghorst 33' (pen.), (yellow card) 45+5'	Stadium: Stamford Bridge; Attendance: 38,947; Referee: Felix Zwayer (Germany)

5 November 2025 4	Ajax (Netherlands)	0–3	(Turkey) Galatasaray	Amsterdam, Netherlands
21:00 CET (UTC+1)	Mokio (yellow card) 4'; Gaaei (yellow card) 38'; Klaassen (yellow card) 75'; McConnell (yellow card) 85'	Report	Osimhen 59', 66' (pen.), 78' (pen.)	Stadium: Johan Cruyff Arena; Attendance: 50,993; Referee: Benoît Bastien (France)

25 November 2025 5	Ajax (Netherlands)	0–2	(Portugal) Benfica	Amsterdam, Netherlands
18:45 CET (UTC+1)	Weghorst (yellow card) 69'	Report	Dahl 6', (yellow card) 74'; Barreiro 90'	Stadium: Johan Cruyff Arena; Attendance: 51,154; Referee: Sven Jablonski (Germany)

10 December 2025 6	Qarabağ (Azerbaijan)	2–4	(Netherlands) Ajax	Baku, Azerbaijan
18:45 CET (UTC+1)	Durán 10'; Silva 47'	Report	Dolberg 39'; Baas (yellow card) 45+1'; Gloukh 79', 90'; Gaaei 82'	Stadium: Tofiq Bahramov Republican Stadium; Attendance: 31,090; Referee: Rade Obrenović (Slovenia)

20 January 2026 7	Villarreal (Spain)	1–2	(Netherlands) Ajax	Villarreal, Spain
21:00 CET (UTC+1)	Oluwaseyi 49'; Mouriño (yellow card) 60'; Partey (yellow card) 71'; Marín (yellow card) 80'	Report	Wijndal (yellow card) 12'; Gloukh 61'; Bouwman (yellow card) 88'; Edvardsen 90'	Stadium: Estadio de la Cerámica; Attendance: 14,023; Referee: Nick Walsh (Scotland)

28 January 2026 8	Ajax (Netherlands)	1–2	(Greece) Olympiacos	Amsterdam, Netherlands
21:00 CET (UTC+1)	Dolberg 69' (pen.)	Report	Costinha (yellow card) 45+1'; Hezze (yellow card) 49', (goal) 79'; Martins 52'	Stadium: Johan Cruyff Arena; Attendance: 51,719; Referee: François Letexier (France)

== Statistics ==
=== Appearances and goals ===
No.	Pos	Nat	Player	Total		Eredivisie		Eredivisie European competition play-offs		KNVB Cup		Champions League	
No.	Pos	Nat	Player	Apps	Goals	Apps	Goals	Apps	Goals	Apps	Goals	Apps	Goals
1	GK	(Czech Republic) CZE	Vítězslav Jaroš	26	0	19	0	0	0	1	0	6	0
2	DF	(Brazil) BRA	Lucas Rosa	33	0	24+3	0	2	0	1	0	3	0
3	DF	(Denmark) DEN	Anton Gaaei	37	3	19+7	1	2	0	1+1	1	5+2	1
4	DF	(Japan) JPN	Ko Itakura	26	1	16+2	1	0+1	0	1	0	5+1	0
5	DF	(Netherlands) NED	Owen Wijndal	27	2	15+4	1	0	0	2	1	6	0
6	MF	(Netherlands) NED	Youri Regeer	37	0	21+4	0	1+1	0	2	0	6+2	0
7	FW	(Argentina) ARG	Maher Carrizo	6	0	0+4	0	0+2	0	0	0	0	0
9	FW	(Denmark) DEN	Kasper Dolberg	30	5	12+10	3	1+1	0	1	0	3+2	2
10	MF	(Israel) ISR	Oscar Gloukh	38	9	16+13	6	0	0	1	0	6+2	3
11	FW	(Belgium) BEL	Mika Godts	44	17	30+2	17	2	0	2	0	7+1	0
12	GK	(Netherlands) NED	Joeri Heerkens	0	0	0	0	0	0	0	0	0	0
15	DF	(Netherlands) NED	Youri Baas	42	4	31	4	2	0	1	0	8	0
16	MF	(Netherlands) NED	Jinairo Johnson	1	0	0+1	0	0	0	0	0	0	0
17	MF	(Norway) NOR	Oliver Edvardsen	22	1	6+12	0	0	0	0	0	1+3	1
18	MF	(Netherlands) NED	Davy Klaassen	42	8	22+8	6	2	2	2	0	6+2	0
19	FW	(Netherlands) NED	Don-Angelo Konadu	11	1	2+7	0	0	0	1	1	0+1	0
23	FW	(Netherlands) NED	Steven Berghuis	22	4	14+5	4	2	0	0	0	1	0
24	FW	(Belgium) BEL	Jorthy Mokio	37	5	13+13	2	2	1	1+1	2	3+4	0
25	FW	(Netherlands) NED	Wout Weghorst	34	9	20+7	8	1+1	0	0	0	4+1	1
26	GK	(Indonesia) IDN	Maarten Paes	13	0	11	0	2	0	0	0	0	0
27	FW	(Sweden) SWE	Maximilian Ibrahimović	0	0	0	0	0	0	0	0	0	0
28	MF	(Netherlands) NED	Kian Fitz-Jim	22	1	4+13	1	0	0	0	0	0+5	0
30	DF	(Netherlands) NED	Aaron Bouwman	14	1	6+2	1	2	0	1+1	0	2	0
32	DF	(Japan) JPN	Takehiro Tomiyasu	8	0	2+4	0	0+2	0	0	0	0	0
37	DF	(Croatia) CRO	Josip Šutalo	31	0	19+5	0	0	0	1	0	4+2	0
41	DF	(Netherlands) NED	Gerald Alders	5	0	2+1	0	0	0	0+1	0	0+1	0
43	MF	(Belgium) BEL	Rayane Bounida	28	2	9+13	1	0	0	1+1	1	1+3	0
47	DF	(Ukraine) UKR	Oleksandr Zinchenko	2	0	1+1	0	0	0	0	0	0	0
48	MF	(Netherlands) NED	Sean Steur	25	1	14+5	1	1+1	0	1	0	2+1	0
66	FW	(Netherlands) NED	Pharell Nash	3	0	0+1	0	0	0	0+1	0	0+1	0
68	FW	(Morocco) MAR	Abdellah Ouazane	1	0	0	0	0	0	0+1	0	0	0
Players sold or loaned out after the start of the season:
7	FW	(Spain) ESP	Raúl Moro	21	1	7+7	0	0	0	0+2	1	2+3	0
8	MF	(Netherlands) NED	Kenneth Taylor	19	2	14+1	2	0	0	0	0	4	0
16	MF	(England) ENG	James McConnell	7	0	1+3	0	0	0	0	0	1+2	0
20	FW	(Burkina Faso) BFA	Bertrand Traoré	1	0	1	0	0	0	0	0	0	0
21	MF	(Netherlands) NED	Branco van den Boomen	1	0	0	0	0	0	0+1	0	0	0
22	GK	(Netherlands) NED	Remko Pasveer	7	0	4	0	0	0	1	0	2	0

Source: Competitive matches

=== Goalscorers ===
Rank	No	Pos	Nat	Name	Eredivisie	Eredivisie European competition play-offs	KNVB Cup	Champions League	Total
1	11	FW	(Belgium)	Mika Godts	17	0	0	0	17
2	10	MF	(Israel)	Oscar Gloukh	6	0	0	3	9
2	25	FW	(Netherlands)	Wout Weghorst	8	0	0	1	9
4	18	MF	(Netherlands)	Davy Klaassen	6	2	0	0	8
5	9	FW	(Denmark)	Kasper Dolberg	3	0	0	2	5
5	24	DF	(Belgium)	Jorthy Mokio	2	1	2	0	5
7	15	DF	(Netherlands)	Youri Baas	4	0	0	0	4
7	23	FW	(Netherlands)	Steven Berghuis	4	0	0	0	4
9	3	DF	(Denmark)	Anton Gaaei	1	0	1	1	3
10	5	DF	(Netherlands)	Owen Wijndal	1	0	1	0	2
10	8	MF	(Netherlands)	Kenneth Taylor	2	0	0	0	2
10	43	MF	(Belgium)	Rayane Bounida	1	0	1	0	2
13	4	DF	(Japan)	Ko Itakura	1	0	0	0	1
13	7	FW	(Spain)	Raúl Moro	0	0	1	0	1
13	17	MF	(Norway)	Oliver Edvardsen	0	0	0	1	1
13	19	FW	(Netherlands)	Don-Angelo Konadu	0	0	1	0	1
13	28	MF	(Netherlands)	Kian Fitz-Jim	1	0	0	0	1
13	30	DF	(Netherlands)	Aaron Bouwman	1	0	0	0	1
13	48	MF	(Netherlands)	Sean Steur	1	0	0	0	1
Own goal					3	0	0	0	3
Totals					62	3	7	8	79

Source: Competitive matches

=== Assists ===
Rank	No	Pos	Nat	Name	Eredivisie	Eredivisie European competition play-offs	KNVB Cup	Champions League	Total
1	11	FW	(Belgium)	Mika Godts	13	1	1	1	15
2	43	MF	(Belgium)	Rayane Bounida	4	0	4	0	8
3	3	DF	(Netherlands)	Anton Gaaei	5	0	0	1	6
3	10	MF	(Israel)	Oscar Gloukh	6	0	0	0	6
5	8	MF	(Netherlands)	Kenneth Taylor	5	0	0	0	5
5	25	FW	(Netherlands)	Wout Weghorst	5	0	0	0	5
7	24	DF	(Belgium)	Jorthy Mokio	2	0	1	0	3
8	6	MF	(Netherlands)	Youri Regeer	2	0	0	0	2
8	7	FW	(Spain)	Raúl Moro	1	0	1	0	2
8	9	FW	(Denmark)	Kasper Dolberg	2	0	0	0	2
8	18	MF	(Netherlands)	Davy Klaassen	2	0	0	0	2
8	23	MF	(Netherlands)	Steven Berghuis	2	0	0	0	2
8	48	MF	(Netherlands)	Sean Steur	1	0	0	1	2
14	2	DF	(Brazil)	Lucas Rosa	0	0	0	1	1
14	15	DF	(Netherlands)	Youri Baas	1	0	0	0	1
14	17	MF	(Norway)	Oliver Edvardsen	1	0	0	0	1
14	19	FW	(Netherlands)	Don-Angelo Konadu	0	0	0	1	1
14	43	MF	(Belgium)	Rayane Bounida	1	0	0	0	1
Totals					50	1	7	4	62

Source: Competitive matches

=== Clean sheets ===
Rank	No	Pos	Nat	Name	Eredivisie	Eredivisie European competition play-offs	KNVB Cup	Champions League	Total
1	26	GK	(Indonesia)	Maarten Paes	5	1	0	0	6
2	1	GK	(Czech Republic)	Vítězslav Jaroš	5	0	0	0	5
Total					10	1	0	0	11

Source: Competitive matches

=== Disciplinary record ===
N	P	Nat.	Name	Eredivisie			Eredivisie European competition play-offs			KNVB Cup			Total			Notes
N	P	Nat.	Name	Yellow card	Second yellow card	Red card	Yellow card	Second yellow card	Red card	Yellow card	Second yellow card	Red card	Yellow card	Second yellow card	Red card	Notes
1	GK	(Czech Republic)	Vítězslav Jaroš	1									1			
2	DF	(Brazil)	Lucas Rosa	4									4			
3	DF	(Denmark)	Anton Gaaei	3						1			4			
4	DF	(Japan)	Ko Itakura	2									2			
5	DF	(Netherlands)	Owen Wijndal	3								1	3		1	
6	MF	(Netherlands)	Youri Regeer	6									6			
7	FW	(Spain)	Raúl Moro	1									1			
8	MF	(Netherlands)	Kenneth Taylor	3									3			
9	FW	(Denmark)	Kasper Dolberg	1									1			
10	MF	(Israel)	Oscar Gloukh	3									3			
11	FW	(Belgium)	Mika Godts	2			1			1			4			
15	DF	(Netherlands)	Youri Baas	2	1								2	1		
16	DF	(England)	James McConnell	1									1			
17	FW	(Norway)	Oliver Edvardsen	3									3			
18	MF	(Netherlands)	Davy Klaassen	1			1						2			
23	MF	(Netherlands)	Steven Berghuis	3									3			
24	FW	(Belgium)	Jorthy Mokio	1									1			
25	FW	(Netherlands)	Wout Weghorst	6			1						7			
28	MF	(Netherlands)	Kian Fitz-Jim	2									2			
30	DF	(Netherlands)	Aaron Bouwman	2									2			
32	DF	(Japan)	Takehiro Tomiyasu			1									1	
37	DF	(Croatia)	Josip Šutalo	1									1			
43	FW	(Belgium)	Rayane Bounida	4									4			
48	FW	(Netherlands)	Sean Steur	2									2			

Source: Competitive matches
Only competitive matches
(yellow card) = Number of bookings; (second yellow card) = Number of sending offs after a second yellow card; (red card) = Number of sending offs by a direct red card.
