= Dies Janse =

Dutch professional footballer (born 2006)

- Janse playing for FC Groningen in 2026.

Personal information
- Full name: Dies Janse
- Date of birth: 17 January 2006 (age 20)
- Place of birth: Goes, Netherlands
- Height: 1.96 m (6 ft 5 in)
- Positions: Centre-back; left-back

Team information
- Current team: Ajax
- Number: 36

Youth career
- –2017: VV Kloetinge
- 2017–2018: JVOZ
- 2018–2020: Sparta Rotterdam
- 2020–2024: Ajax

Senior career*
Years	Team	Apps	(Gls)
2023–	Jong Ajax	33	(2)
2024–	Ajax	8	(0)
2025–2026	→ Groningen (loan)	31	(2)

International career^{‡}
2021	Netherlands U16	1	(1)
2023	Netherlands U17	11	(1)
2023–2024	Netherlands U18	6	(0)
2024–2025	Netherlands U19	13	(0)
2026–	Netherlands U21	5	(0)
Medal record
Men's football
Representing Netherlands
UEFA European Under-19 Championship
Winner	2025 Romania
- * Club domestic league appearances and goals as of 25 October 2026 ‡ National team caps and goals as of 6 October 2026

Dies Janse (born 17 January 2006) is a Dutch professional footballer who plays as a centre-back or left-back for Eredivisie club Ajax and the Netherlands under-21 national team.

== Early life ==
Born in Goes, Zeeland, Janse began playing football locally at VV Kloetinge before joining the Jeugd Voetbal Opleiding Zeeland (JVOZ) academy in 2017. In 2018, he entered the youth setup of Sparta Rotterdam, spending two seasons with the club before moving to the Ajax Youth Academy in 2020. During his progression through Ajax's youth ranks, he initially lived with a host family in Amsterdam-Oost.

== Club career ==
=== Ajax ===
==== 2023–2025: Youth development and first-team debut ====
Janse made his professional debut in the Eerste Divisie for Jong Ajax on 25 August 2023, appearing as a second-half substitute for Rida Chahid in a 4–2 away defeat against SC Cambuur. Shortly after, he signed a three-year professional contract running until 2026. On 15 December 2023, he scored his first professional league goal with a header during a 2–2 draw against Jong PSV.

On 23 July 2024, following strong pre-season displays under incoming head coach Francesco Farioli, Janse signed a contract extension keeping him tied to Ajax until June 2028, with an option for an additional year. He made his official first-team debut on 11 August 2024, starting at left-back in a 1–0 Eredivisie home victory over SC Heerenveen. Across the 2024–25 season, Janse made six senior competitive appearances—including five in domestic play and an appearance in the UEFA Europa League—while continuing regular development with Jong Ajax, where he made 20 appearances in the Eerste Divisie.

==== 2025–2026: Loan to FC Groningen ====
On 19 August 2025, Janse agreed to another contract extension running until June 2029 and joined fellow Eredivisie club FC Groningen on a season-long loan. Under manager Dick Lukkien, Janse broke through as an undisputed starter on the left side of central defence, making 31 league appearances and scoring two goals. His performances drew praise from Lukkien, who publicly endorsed him as ready for a permanent starting position in Ajax's backline. Reflecting on the spell, Janse noted that maintaining sole focus on Groningen's tactical instructions helped him mature rapidly both as an individual and on the pitch.

==== 2026–present: Return to Ajax ====
In July 2026, Janse returned to Ajax for pre-season under new head coach Míchel. He was integrated into the first-team squad for their European campaign, making appearances in the UEFA Conference League qualifying rounds against Shelbourne and FC Sion. On 16 September 2026, Janse committed his long-term future to the club by signing a contract extension through to June 2030.

== International career ==
Janse has represented the Netherlands across multiple youth international age brackets. In May 2023, he was named in the Netherlands under-17 squad for the 2023 UEFA European Under-17 Championship in Hungary, featuring in all three group-stage fixtures.

In June 2025, Janse started for the Netherlands under-19 side at the 2025 UEFA European Under-19 Championship in Romania. He featured as a left-sided central defender throughout the tournament, helping the Netherlands claim their maiden Under-19 European Championship title following a 1–0 win over Spain in the final. For his performances, Janse was selected in the UEFA Technical Observer Team of the Tournament. In March 2026, he earned his first caps for the Netherlands under-21 team.

== Style of play ==
Janse is a tall, left-footed centre-back capable of operating as an inverted or defensive left-back. Standing at 1.96 m (6 ft 5 in), he utilizes his frame and reach effectively in one-on-one challenges and defensive aerial duels; during the 2025–26 Eredivisie campaign, he ranked among the league's top five central defenders in duel success rate, winning 60.3% of his individual contests.

Comfortable in possession and educated in Ajax's positional play philosophy, Janse is recognized for his composure when stepping out from the backline with progressive carries (indribbelen) and his expansive diagonal distribution with his left foot. Due to his height and physical build, he has occasionally experienced difficulties defending in extensive open space against quick, direct runners or when forced to pivot quickly in transition, compensating through anticipatory positioning and tactical game-reading. He has frequently cited veteran Dutch international defender Daley Blind as a key mentor and positional reference point in developing his ball distribution and anticipatory defending.

== Personal life ==
His older brother, Rijk Janse, is also a professional footballer who plays as a goalkeeper and came through the academy of NEC Nijmegen.

== Career statistics ==
As of match played 25 October 2026

Appearances and goals by club, season and competition
Club	Season	League			KNVB Cup		Europe		Other		Total	
Club	Season	Division	Apps	Goals	Apps	Goals	Apps	Goals	Apps	Goals	Apps	Goals
Jong Ajax	2023–24	Eerste Divisie	12	1	—		—		—		12	1
Jong Ajax	2024–25	Eerste Divisie	20	1	—		—		—		20	1
Jong Ajax	2026–27	Eerste Divisie	1	0	—		—		—		1	0
Jong Ajax	Total		33	2	—		—		—		33	2
Ajax	2024–25	Eredivisie	4	0	0	0	1 (Note: Appearance in UEFA Europa League)	0	—		5	0
Ajax	2025–26	Eredivisie	0	0	0	0	0	0	—		0	0
Ajax	2026–27	Eredivisie	4	0	0	0	3 (Note: Appearances in UEFA Conference League)	0	—		7	0
Ajax	Total		8	0	0	0	4	0	—		12	0
Groningen (loan)	2025–26	Eredivisie	31	2	1	0	—		1 (Note: Appearance in Eredivisie European play-offs)	0	33	2
Career total			72	4	1	0	4	0	1	0	78	4

== Honours ==
Netherlands U19

- UEFA European Under-19 Championship: 2025

Individual

- UEFA European Under-19 Championship Team of the Tournament: 2025
