= Youri Baas =

Dutch footballer (born 2003)

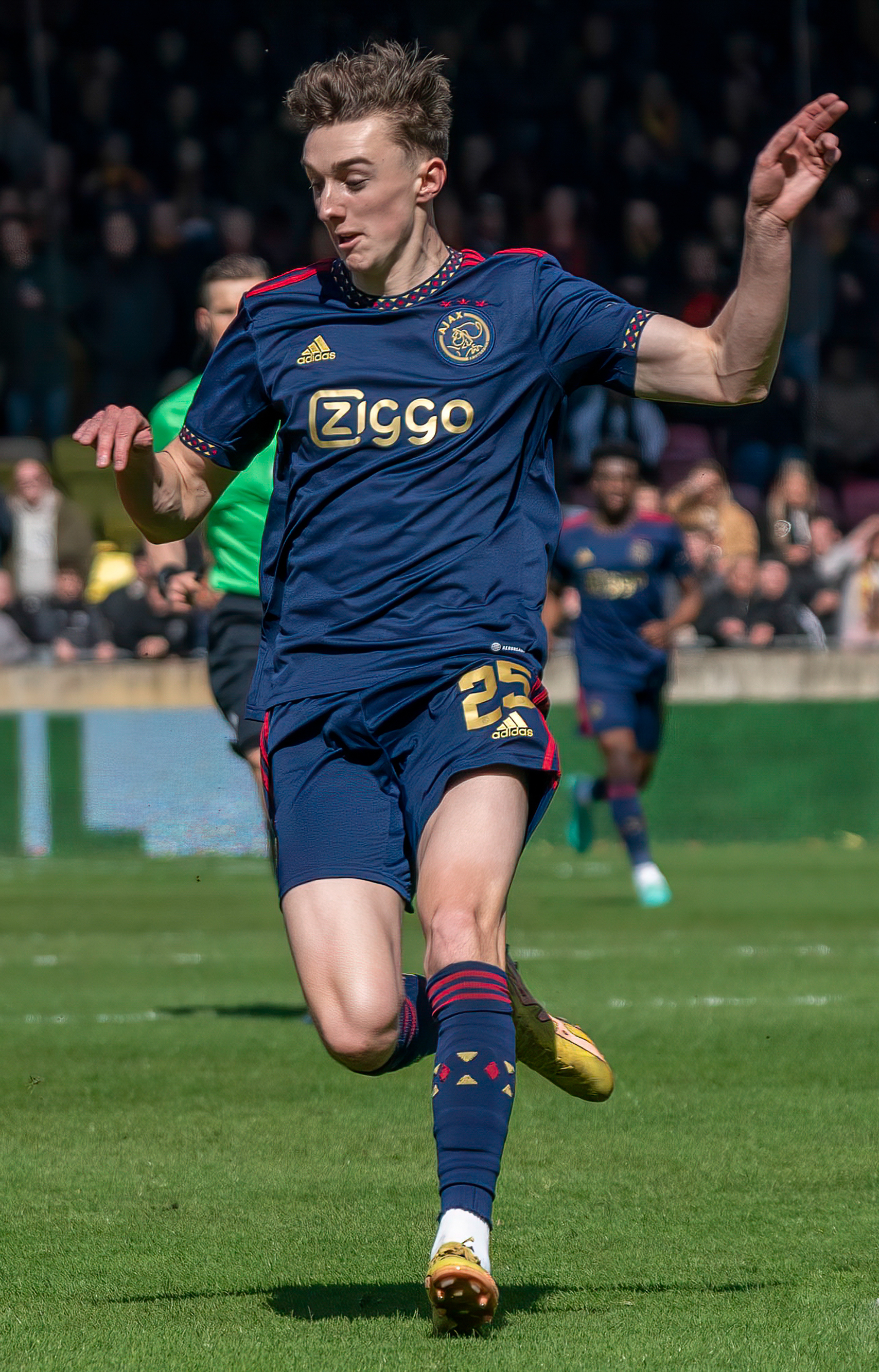
- Baas with Ajax in 2023

Personal information
- Full name: Youri Baas
- Date of birth: 17 March 2003 (age 23)
- Place of birth: Oostvoorne, Netherlands
- Height: 1.88 m (6 ft 2 in)
- Positions: Centre-back; left-back

Team information
- Current team: Ajax
- Number: 15

Youth career
- OVV Oostvoorne
- 2012–2018: Excelsior
- 2018–2020: Ajax

Senior career*
Years	Team	Apps	(Gls)
2020–2023	Jong Ajax	50	(2)
2022–	Ajax	69	(6)
2023–2024	→ NEC (loan)	25	(3)

International career^{‡}
2017–2018	Netherlands U15	2	(0)
2018–2019	Netherlands U16	4	(0)
2019	Netherlands U17	7	(0)
2021	Netherlands U19	3	(0)
2023	Netherlands U20	1	(0)
2023–2024	Netherlands U21	7	(0)
- * Club domestic league appearances and goals as of 25 October 2026 ‡ National team caps and goals as of 19 November 2024

Youri Baas (born 17 March 2003) is a Dutch professional footballer who plays as a centre-back or left-back for Eredivisie club Ajax.

A product of the De Toekomst youth setup, Baas began his professional career as a left-back before successfully transitioning into a left-sided central defender. After a loan spell at N.E.C., he established himself as a key starter for Ajax, winning the Ajax Talent of the Year award in 2025 and the Ajax Player of the Year award for the 2025–26 season.

== Club career ==
=== Early career and Jong Ajax ===
Born in Oostvoorne, Baas began playing youth football with local amateur side OVV before joining the youth academy of Excelsior in 2012. In 2018, he moved to the Ajax Youth Academy.

Baas made his professional debut with Jong Ajax in a 2–2 Eerste Divisie draw against De Graafschap on 11 December 2020, entering as an 86th-minute substitute for Naci Ünüvar. On 26 March 2021, he signed a contract extension keeping him in Amsterdam until June 2024.

=== Ajax ===
Baas made his senior first-team debut for Ajax on 28 August 2022, coming on as a substitute in a 2–0 Eredivisie victory over FC Utrecht. He registered ten appearances across the Eredivisie, KNVB Cup, and UEFA Champions League during the 2022–23 season.

==== Loan to N.E.C. ====
For the 2023–24 season, Baas joined N.E.C. on a season-long loan to gain senior experience. Utilized as both a left-back and left midfielder by manager Rogier Meijer, he made 25 league appearances and scored three goals. He also helped N.E.C. reach the 2024 KNVB Cup final, starting in the 1–0 defeat to Feyenoord.

==== Positional transition and Player of the Year (2024–2026) ====
Upon returning to Ajax for the 2024–25 season, head coach Francesco Farioli converted Baas from a left-back into a left-sided central defender, forming a central pairing alongside Josip Šutalo. He received a red card following two yellow cards in a UEFA Europa League match against Slavia Prague on 3 October 2024. On 20 December 2024, Baas signed a new contract extension with Ajax through 30 June 2028. At the end of the 2024–25 campaign, he was named Ajax Talent of the Year.

During the 2025–26 season, Baas solidified his position as Ajax's primary left-centre-back and wore the captain's armband in an Eredivisie match against his former club N.E.C. Statistically, he led the Eredivisie in total completed passes (2,124 out of 2,317, a 92.4% accuracy rate) and led Ajax in ball recoveries (140). Following the season, he was voted the Ajax Player of the Year for 2025–26 by the Ajax Supporters Association.

== International career ==
Baas represented the Netherlands across several youth categories, including the under-15, under-16, under-17, under-19, under-20, and under-21 national teams.

In March 2025, national team manager Ronald Koeman called up Baas to the senior Netherlands squad for the UEFA Nations League quarter-final matches against Spain.

== Style of play ==
Initially trained as an attacking full-back, Baas developed into a ball-playing central defender under Francesco Farioli. Known for his tactical intelligence, pressing resistance, and high-volume line-breaking passing, he has cited former teammate Daley Blind as a major influence on his ability to delay passes to manipulate opposition pressure. To meet the physical demands of central defence, Baas added four kilograms of muscle mass during his physical development at Ajax.

== Career statistics ==
=== Club ===
As of match played 25 October 2026

Appearances and goals by club, season and competition
Club	Season	League			KNVB Cup		Europe		Other		Total	
Club	Season	Division	Apps	Goals	Apps	Goals	Apps	Goals	Apps	Goals	Apps	Goals
Jong Ajax	2020–21	Eerste Divisie	17	0	—		—		—		17	0
Jong Ajax	2021–22	Eerste Divisie	23	1	—		—		—		23	1
Jong Ajax	2022–23	Eerste Divisie	10	1	—		—		—		10	1
Jong Ajax	Total		50	2	—		—		—		50	2
Ajax	2022–23	Eredivisie	6	0	1	0	3 (Note: Appearances in UEFA Champions League)	0	0	0	10	0
Ajax	2024–25	Eredivisie	23	1	1	0	15 (Note: Appearances in UEFA Europa League)	0	—		39	1
Ajax	2025–26	Eredivisie	31	4	1	0	8	0	1 (Note: Appearance in European play-offs)	0	41	4
Ajax	2026–27	Eredivisie	9	1	0	0	5 (Note: Appearances in UEFA Conference League)	1	—		14	2
Ajax	Total		69	6	3	0	32	1	1	0	104	7
NEC Nijmegen (loan)	2023–24	Eredivisie	25	3	2	0	—		—		27	3
Career total			144	11	5	0	31	1	1	0	181	12

== Honours ==
NEC

- KNVB Cup runner-up: 2023–24

Individual

- AFC Ajax Player of the Year: 2025–26
- Ajax Talent of the Year: 2024–25
- Eredivisie Team of the Month: September 2024
