= Roy Steur =

Dutch footballer (born 2005)

Personal information
- Full name: Roy Johannes Maria Steur
- Date of birth: 1 February 2005 (age 21)
- Place of birth: Volendam, Netherlands
- Height: 1.92 m (6 ft 4 in)
- Position: Goalkeeper

Team information
- Current team: Volendam
- Number: 16

Youth career
- 2015–2021: Ajax
- 2021–2023: Bayer Leverkusen

Senior career*
Years	Team	Apps	(Gls)
2023–2025	Jong PSV	12	(0)
2025–	Volendam	3	(0)

International career^{‡}
2020	Netherlands U15	1	(0)
2021	Netherlands U17	4	(0)
2022–2023	Netherlands U18	2	(0)
2023–2024	Netherlands U19	7	(0)
- * Club domestic league appearances and goals as of 19 May 2026 ‡ National team caps and goals as of 23 March 2024

Roy Johannes Maria Steur (born 1 February 2005) is a Dutch footballer who plays as a goalkeeper for Eerste Divisie club Volendam.

== Career ==
From Volendam in the Netherlands, Steur was reportedly a height of 1.92 m tall by the time he was seventeen years-old. Steur joined the youth academy at AFC Ajax in 2015 and progressed through their academy before moving to Bayer Leverkusen in 2021. In January 2023 Steur left Germany to return to the Netherlands and signed a two-and-a-half-year contract with PSV Eindhoven.

He made his senior debut on 17 April 2023 for Jong PSV in the Eerste Divisie against Jong Ajax, earning credit for his saves in a 5–4 defeat despite conceding five goals.

On 9 July 2025, Steur signed a three-year contract with Volendam.

== Personal life ==
He is the son of former football player and manager Johan Steur and his younger brother Sean Steur plays for Newcastle United

== Career statistics ==
=== Club ===
As of match played 15 January 2026

Appearances and goals by club, season and competition
Club	Season	League			KNVB Cup		Other		Total	
Club	Season	Division	Apps	Goals	Apps	Goals	Apps	Goals	Apps	Goals
Jong PSV	2022–23	Eerste Divisie	2	0	—		—		2	0
Jong PSV	2023–24	Eerste Divisie	2	0	—		—		2	0
Jong PSV	2024–25	Eerste Divisie	8	0	—		—		8	0
Jong PSV	Total		12	0	—		—		12	0
Volendam	2025–26	Eredivisie	0	0	3	0	—		3	0
Career total			12	0	3	0	—		15	0
