= Jorthy Mokio =

Belgian footballer (born 2008)

- Mokio with Ajax in 2026

Personal information
- Full name: Jorthy Mokio
- Date of birth: 29 February 2008 (age 18)
- Place of birth: Ghent, Belgium
- Height: 1.82 m (6 ft 0 in)
- Positions: Central midfielder; defensive midfielder

Team information
- Current team: Ajax
- Number: 24

Youth career
- 2017–2020: KFC Merelbeke
- 2021–2024: Gent

Senior career*
Years	Team	Apps	(Gls)
2024	Gent	4	(0)
2024–2025	Jong Ajax	19	(2)
2024–	Ajax	47	(6)

International career^{‡}
2023	Belgium U15	5	(2)
2023	Belgium U16	3	(0)
2023–2024	Belgium U17	4	(0)
2025	Belgium U18	1	(0)
2024	Belgium U19	3	(0)
2024–2026	Belgium U21	6	(2)
2025	Belgium	1	(0)
2026–	DR Congo	1	(0)
- * Club domestic league appearances and goals as of 18:45, 25 October 2026 (UTC) ‡ National team caps and goals as of 23:45, 2 October 2026 (UTC)

Jorthy Mokio (born 29 February 2008) is a professional footballer who plays as a central midfielder or defensive midfielder for Eredivisie club Ajax. Born in Belgium and having represented his birth country at youth and senior international levels, he plays for the DR Congo national team.

== Club career ==
=== Gent ===
Mokio joined the Gent youth academy from KFC Merelbeke in 2021. On 4 October 2023, he debuted in the UEFA Youth League in a match against Basel, becoming the youngest Gent player ever to participate in the competition. Developing initially as a ball-playing centre-back, he was widely regarded as a top defensive prospect and attracted interest from major European clubs. On his 16th birthday, 29 February 2024, he became eligible to play for the senior team. He made his senior debut for Gent in the Belgian Pro League on 29 March 2024, starting in a 5–1 win against Standard Liège. He made four appearances for the first team towards the end of the season.

=== Ajax ===
On 24 June 2024, having turned down offers from other clubs including reportedly Barcelona, Mokio joined Dutch club Ajax on a free transfer, signing a contract until June 2027. He initially started with the reserve team, Jong Ajax, making his Eerste Divisie debut on 12 August 2024 against Jong PSV. During his period with Jong Ajax, his positional development transitioned toward midfield, scoring twice in 17 appearances during the first half of the season while regularly featuring as a defensive midfielder. Mokio made his competitive debut for the Ajax first team on 29 August 2024, coming on as a substitute against Jagiellonia Białystok in the UEFA Europa League play-off round. In doing so, at 16 years and 182 days, he became the youngest non-Dutch player ever to debut for Ajax.

His integration into the first team under manager Francesco Farioli accelerated in the new year. He made his Eredivisie debut starting at left-back against Fortuna Sittard on 9 February 2025; at 16 years and 346 days, he became the second-youngest player to start a league match for Ajax, only three days older than Clarence Seedorf. Four days later, on 13 February, Mokio made his first European start against Union Saint-Gilloise in the Europa League knockout round play-offs and scored his first senior goal with a volley in Ajax's 2–0 victory. This goal made him the youngest ever scorer in a UEFA Europa League knockout stage match (16 years, 350 days).

In the 2025–26 season, Mokio established himself as a central midfield regular. On 14 December 2025, he scored in a 2–0 win against rivals Feyenoord in De Klassieker, becoming the second-youngest scorer in the fixture's Eredivisie history at 17 years and 289 days, behind only Nwankwo Kanu. On 9 April 2026, Mokio signed a new five-year contract extension through June 2031 under technical director Jordi Cruyff.

== Style of play ==
Initially developed through Gent's youth academy as a left-footed centre-back, Mokio subsequently transitioned into midfield roles at Ajax. Belgium under-21 manager Gill Swerts described him as an athletic, press-resistant player possessing vertical drive and passing precision, noting that while Belgium youth teams occasionally deployed him at centre-back or left-back, his natural vision and problem-solving qualities allowed him to dictate play effectively from central and defensive midfield.

== International career ==
Born in Belgium, Mokio is of Congolese descent. He has represented Belgium at U15, U16 and U17 levels.

In September 2024, Mokio made his debut for the Belgium U21 team in a 2025 UEFA European Under-21 Championship qualifier against Kazakhstan, scoring in a 3–1 victory. On 20 March 2025, Mokio made his senior debut for the Belgium national team, coming on as a substitute in a UEFA Nations League play-off match against Ukraine. Aged 17 years and 19 days, he became one of the youngest players ever to represent Belgium at senior level.

On 8 May 2026, Mokio announced his decision to switch international allegiance from Belgium to DR Congo. In accordance with FIFA regulations, he will be unable to play an official match for DR Congo until 2028, as he has already played a senior international match with Belgium.

Mokio was one of the players who were called up with the DR Congo national team by head coach Sébastien Desabre for the two friendlies against Uganda (2 and 5 October).

== Career statistics ==
=== Club ===
As of match played 25 October 2026

Appearances and goals by club, season and competition
Club	Season	League			National cup (Note: Includes KNVB Cup)		Europe		Other		Total	
Club	Season	Division	Apps	Goals	Apps	Goals	Apps	Goals	Apps	Goals	Apps	Goals
Gent	2023–24	Belgian Pro League	4	0	0	0	0	0	—		4	0
Jong Gent	2023–24	Belgian Division 3	1	0	—		—		—		1	0
Jong Ajax	2024–25	Eerste Divisie	17	2	—		—		—		17	2
Jong Ajax	2025–26	Eerste Divisie	2	0	—		—		—		2	0
Jong Ajax	Total		19	2	—		—		—		19	2
Ajax	2024–25	Eredivisie	11	1	0	0	7 (Note: Appearances in UEFA Europa League)	1	—		18	2
Ajax	2025–26	Eredivisie	26	2	2	2	7 (Note: Appearances in UEFA Champions League)	0	2 (Note: Appearances in Eredivisie European play-offs)	1	37	5
Ajax	2026–27	Eredivisie	10	3	0	0	8 (Note: Appearances in UEFA Conference League)	0	—		18	3
Ajax	Total		47	6	2	2	22	1	2	1	73	10
Career total			71	8	2	2	22	1	2	1	97	12

=== International ===
As of match played 2 October 2026

Appearances and goals by national team and year
National team	Year	Apps	Goals
Belgium	2025	1	0
Total		1	0
DR Congo	2026	1	0
Total		1	0
International total		2	0
