= Sean Steur =

Dutch footballer (born 2008)

- Sean Steur playing for Newcastle United in 2026

Personal information
- Date of birth: 11 January 2008 (age 18)
- Place of birth: Purmerend, Netherlands
- Height: 1.83 m (6 ft 0 in)
- Position: Central midfielder

Team information
- Current team: Newcastle United
- Number: 14

Youth career
- 2014–2016: RKAV Volendam
- 2016–2024: Ajax

Senior career*
Years	Team	Apps	(Gls)
2024–2025	Jong Ajax	40	(1)
2025–2026	Ajax	22	(1)
2026–	Newcastle United	3	(0)

International career^{‡}
2023	Netherlands U15	1	(0)
2023–2024	Netherlands U16	9	(0)
2024–2025	Netherlands U17	9	(0)
2025–2026	Netherlands U18	6	(2)
2026–	Netherlands U19	3	(0)
- * Club domestic league appearances and goals as of 5 September 2026 ‡ National team caps and goals as of 31 March 2026

Sean Steur (born 11 January 2008) is a Dutch professional footballer who plays as a central midfielder for Premier League club Newcastle United.

== Club career ==
=== Early life and youth ===
Born in Purmerend, Steur began his football career at RKAV Volendam. In 2016, he moved to the youth academy of Ajax, where he progressed through the various age groups.

=== Ajax ===
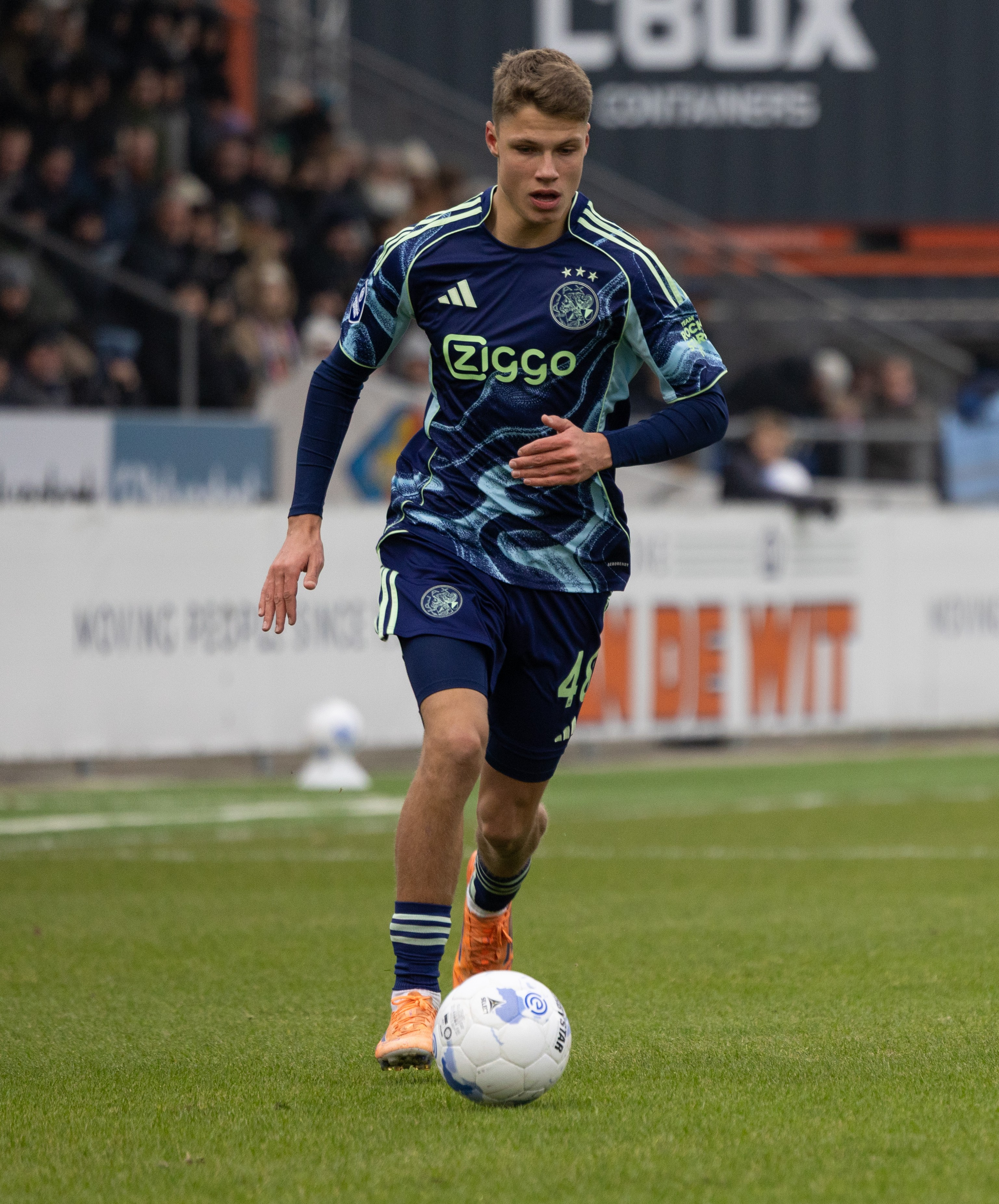
Steur with Ajax in 2026.

Steur made his professional debut with Jong Ajax on 10 May 2024, appearing as a substitute in a 4–1 Eerste Divisie loss to Jong AZ. Following his breakthrough into the reserve squad, he signed his first professional contract with Ajax on 20 August 2024, binding him to the club until June 2027.

During the 2024–25 season, Steur began training with the first team and made his Eredivisie debut. His development continued into the 2025–26 season, where he saw increased playing time with the senior squad, including an appearance in the UEFA Champions League. In recognition of his progress, Ajax announced a further contract extension for Steur on 14 August 2025.

Steur received significant media praise following his performance in De Klassieker against rivals Feyenoord. At just 17 years old, he was commended for his maturity and composure in the high-pressure fixture, with observers noting his impact at an age when most players are yet to reach the first team. In an interview with NOS, Steur cited his ability to adapt quickly to the higher level of play as a key factor in his rapid promotion.

=== Newcastle United ===
In July 2026, Steur joined Premier League side Newcastle United on a five-year deal.

== International career ==
Steur is a youth international for the Netherlands. He has represented the nation at under-15 and under-16 levels, and later progressed to the under-17 and under-18 teams.

== Personal life ==
Steur comes from a footballing family; he is the son of Johan Steur and the younger brother of Roy Steur, a goalkeeper who plays professionally for Volendam. Sean has expressed a strong desire to one day play professionally alongside his brother.

== Career statistics ==
As of 8 September 2026

Appearances and goals by club, season and competition
Club	Season	League			National cup (Note: Includes KNVB Cup)		League cup (Note: Includes EFL Cup)		Europe		Other		Total	
Club	Season	Division	Apps	Goals	Apps	Goals	Apps	Goals	Apps	Goals	Apps	Goals	Apps	Goals
Jong Ajax	2023–24	Eerste Divisie	1	0	—		—		—		—		1	0
Jong Ajax	2024–25	Eerste Divisie	17	0	—		—		—		—		17	0
Jong Ajax	2025–26	Eerste Divisie	11	1	—		—		—		—		11	1
Jong Ajax	Total		29	1	—		—		—		—		29	1
Ajax	2024–25	Eredivisie	1	0	0	0	—		0	0	—		1	0
Ajax	2025–26	Eredivisie	19	1	1	0	—		3 (Note: Appearances in UEFA Champions League)	0	1 (Note: Appearance in Eredivisie European play-offs)	0	24	1
Ajax	Total		20	1	1	0	—		3	0	1	0	25	1
Newcastle United	2026–27	Premier League	3	0	0	0	2	0	—		—		5	0
Career total			52	2	1	0	2	0	3	0	1	0	59	2
