= 2025–26 Jong Ajax season =

Jong Ajax
2025–26 season
- Chairman: Ernst Boekhorst
- Manager: Willem Weijs (until 10 February 2026); Óscar García (from 10 February 2026); Paul Nuijten (from 8 March 2026)
- Stadium: Sportpark De Toekomst
- Eerste Divisie: 20th
- Top goalscorer: Don O'Niel (8)

During the 2025–26 season, Jong Ajax participated in the Dutch Eerste Divisie, the 2nd tier of professional football in the Netherlands. It was their 12th consecutive season in the Eerste Divisie.

== Squad ==
As of 3 September 2025

Note: Flags indicate national team as defined under FIFA eligibility rules; some limited exceptions apply. Players may hold more than one non-FIFA nationality.

No.	Pos.	Nation	Player
16	MF	NED	Jinairo Johnson
41	DF	NED	Gerald Alders
44	MF	NED	Mark Verkuijl
45	DF	NED	Ryan van de Pavert
46	DF	NED	Lucas Jetten
49	MF	NED	Kayden Wolff
52	GK	NED	Paul Reverson
53	MF	NED	Mylo van der Lans
54	FW	NED	Skye Vink
55	MF	NED	Tijn Peters
56	FW	NED	David Kalokoh
59	FW	NED	Emre Ünüvar

No.	Pos.	Nation	Player
61	DF	NED	Avery Appiah
62	GK	NED	Aymean El Hani
63	MF	NED	Don O'Niel
64	MF	NED	Damian van der Vaart
65	MF	ITA	Luca Messori
68	MF	MAR	Abdellah Ouazane
—	DF	BEL	Ethan Butera
—	DF	FRA	Marvyn Muzungu
—	MF	NED	Mohamed Abdalla
—	FW	NED	Pharell Nash
—	FW	MAR	Zakaria Ouazane

== Transfers ==
For a list of all Dutch football transfers in the summer window (23 June 2025 to 2 September 2025) please see List of Dutch football transfers summer 2025. For a list of all Dutch football transfers in the winter window (2 January 2026 to 2 February 2026) please see List of Dutch football transfers winter 2025–26.

=== Summer ===
In:

No.	Pos.	Nation	Player
—	DF	NED	Gerald Alders (loan return at FC Twente)
—	DF	NED	Avery Appiah (from Ajax U19)
—	DF	NED	Mylo van der Lans (from Ajax U19)
—	DF	FRA	Marvyn Muzungu (from Auxerre)
—	MF	NED	Jinairo Johnson (from Ajax U19)
—	MF	ITA	Luca Messori (from Ajax U19)
—	MF	NED	Don O'Niel (from Ajax U19)
—	MF	MAR	Abdellah Ouazane (from Ajax U17)
—	MF	NED	Tijn Peters (from Ajax U19)
—	MF	NED	Damian van der Vaart (from Ajax U19)
—	FW	MAR	Zakaria Ouazane (from Ajax U19)
—	FW	NED	Emre Ünüvar (from Ajax U19)

Out:

No.	Pos.	Nation	Player
19	FW	NED	Don-Angelo Konadu (to Ajax)
24	MF	BEL	Jorthy Mokio (to Ajax)
30	DF	NED	Aaron Bouwman (to Ajax)
36	DF	NED	Dies Janse (on loan at FC Groningen)
41	MF	NED	Julian Brandes (released to Pescara)
42	DF	NED	Nick Verschuren (on loan at FC Volendam)
43	MF	BEL	Rayane Bounida (to Ajax)
45	DF	NED	Precious Ugwu (to FC Volendam)
47	DF	NED	Tristan Gooijer (on loan at PEC Zwolle, previously on loan)
48	DF	MAR	Diyae Jermoumi (released to SC Cambuur)
48	MF	NED	Sean Steur (to Ajax)
50	MF	POL	Jan Faberski (on loan at PEC Zwolle)
53	MF	NED	Rico Speksnijder (released)
55	MF	MAR	Rida Chahid (released)
57	FW	NED	Yoram Boerhout (released to Feyenoord U21)

=== Winter ===
In:

No.	Pos.	Nation	Player
—	MF	NED	Mohamed Abdalla (from Ajax U19)
—	FW	NED	Pharell Nash (from Ajax U19)

Out:

No.	Pos.	Nation	Player
51	GK	ENG	Charlie Setford (on loan at Milton Keynes Dons)
58	MF	NED	Nassef Chourak (to Kalmar FF)

== Competitions ==
=== Eerste Divisie ===
==== League table ====
Pos	Team	Pld	W	D	L	GF	GA	GD	Pts	Promotion or qualification
16	TOP Oss	38	11	11	16	54	64	−10	44	
17	Jong AZ	38	12	4	22	61	76	−15	40	Reserve teams are not eligible to be promoted to the Eredivisie
18	Helmond Sport	38	10	9	19	42	62	−20	39	
19	MVV Maastricht	38	9	11	18	41	73	−32	38	
20	Jong Ajax	38	9	8	21	50	73	−23	35	Reserve teams are not eligible to be promoted to the Eredivisie

Source: Flashscore, Keuken Kampioen Divisie (in Dutch)
Rules for classification: Season in progress: 1) Most points won; 2) Less points lost; 3) Goal difference; 4) Goals scored; 5) Head-to-head points; 6) Head-to-head goal difference; 7) Head-to-head goals scored 8) Head-to-head away goals scored 9) Alphabetical order; End of season: 1) Points; 2) Goal difference; 3) Goals scored; 4) Head-to-head points; 5) Head-to-head goal difference; 6) Head-to-head goals scored 7) Head-to-head away goals scored; 8) Extra match or series of matches 9) Goal difference (series of matches) 10) Goals scored (series of matches) 11) Penalty shoot-out (extra match or series of matches)

==== Results summary ====
Overall								Home						Away					
Pld	W	D	L	GF	GA	GD	Pts	W	D	L	GF	GA	GD	W	D	L	GF	GA	GD
38	9	8	21	50	73	−23	35	5	5	9	28	32	−4	4	3	12	22	41	−19

Last updated: 24 April 2026.
Source: Keuken Kampionen Divisie

==== Results by round ====
Round	1	2	3	4	5	6	7	8	9	10	11	12	13	14	15	16	17	18	19	20	21	22	23	24	25	26	27	28	29	30	31	32	33	34	35	36	37	38
Ground	A	H	A	H	A	H	A	H	A	H	H	A	H	A	H	H	A	H	A	A	H	A	H	A	H	A	H	A	H	A	H	A	H	A	A	H	A	H
Result	L	W	L	D	D	L	L	L	L	D	D	D	L	L	D	L	L	W	L	L	L	W	D	D	W	L	L	W	W	L	W	W	L	L	L	L	W	L
Position	17	10	12	10	12	16	16	19	19	19	19	19	19	19	19	19	20	19	19	20	20	19	20	20	20	20	20	20	20	20	19	18	19	19	20	20	20	20

Source: Keuken Kampionen Divisie
A = Away; H = Home; W = Win; D = Draw; L = Loss

==== Matches ====
8 August 2025 1	FC Den Bosch	2–0	Jong Ajax	's-Hertogenbosch
20:00 CET	Fortes 9'; Akmum 80'	Report	Johnson (yellow card) 49'	Stadium: De Vliert; Attendance: 6,320; Referee: Kevin Puts

18 August 2025 2	Jong Ajax	4–1	Jong AZ Alkmaar	Duivendrecht
20:00 CEST	Wolff 1', 28'; Weijs (yellow card) 59'; Van de Pavert (yellow card) 78'; O'Niel 90+4'; Konadu 90+6' (pen.)	Report	Van Duijn 12' (pen.), (yellow card) 34'; Verhulst (yellow card) 90+6'	Stadium: Sportpark De Toekomst; Attendance: 1,878; Referee: Laurens Gerrets

25 August 2025 3	Jong FC Utrecht	4−3	Jong Ajax	Utrecht
20:00 CEST	Dundas 11'; Johnson 46' (o.g.); Van der Wegen 56'; Demircan 69'; Held (yellow card) 87'	Report	Bounida 2', 58'; Jetten (yellow card) 16'; Kaplan 72'	Stadium: Sportcomplex Zoudenbalch; Attendance: 461; Referee: Martin Pérez

29 August 2025 4	Jong Ajax	0−0	MVV Maastricht	Duivendrecht
20:00 CEST	A. Ouazane (yellow card) 16'; Bounida (penalty missed) 38'	Report	Kleinen (yellow card) 54'	Stadium: Sportpark De Toekomst; Attendance: 758; Referee: Kevin Puts

12 September 2025 5	Roda JC Kerkrade	3–3	Jong Ajax	Kerkrade
20:00 CEST	Van den Hurk 22' (pen.), 50'; Kruiver (yellow card) 39'; Breij (yellow card) 39'; Maiorano (yellow card) 73' (yellow-red card) 81', (goal) 80'	Report	Wolff 12', 43'; Reverson (yellow card) 21'; Appiah (yellow card) 88'; Vink 90+4'	Stadium: Parkstad Limburg Stadion; Attendance: 7,672; Referee: Clay Ruperti

15 September 2025 6	Jong Ajax	1−3	ADO Den Haag	Duivendrecht
20:00 CEST	Z. Ouazane 83'	Report	Waem 8'; Rottier 38'; Bal 52'; Reischl (yellow card) 84'	Stadium: Sportpark De Toekomst; Attendance: 966; Referee: Rick Sturm

19 September 2025 7	Willem II	1−0	Jong Ajax	Tilburg
20:00 CEST	Ćulum 51'; El Allouchi (yellow card) 74'	Report		Stadium: Koning Willem II Stadion; Attendance: 13,800; Referee: Ingmar Oostrom

26 September 2025 8	Jong Ajax	2−4	VVV-Venlo	Duivendrecht
20:00 CEST	Ünüvar 18'; Verkuijl (yellow card) 45+1'; O'Niel 66'	Report	Matoug 11'; Van Zijl 46'; Triep 52'; Eijgenraam (yellow card) 58'; Blancquart 79'; Joosten (yellow card) 81'	Stadium: Sportpark De Toekomst; Attendance: 970; Referee: Niels Boel

29 September 2025 9	RKC Waalwijk	2−1	Jong Ajax	Waalwijk
20:00 CEST	Cleonise 19'; Van der Venne 82' (pen.)	Report	O'Niel 77'	Stadium: Mandemakers Stadion; Attendance: 3,759; Referee: Rick Sturm

3 October 2025 10	Jong Ajax	2−2	De Graafschap	Duivendrecht
20:00 CEST	Ünüvar 27', (yellow card) 78'; Wolff 57', (yellow card) 69'; Butera (yellow card) 90+2'	Report	Niemeijer 9'; De Jong 70'; Besselink (yellow card) 74'	Stadium: Sportpark De Toekomst; Attendance: 1,200; Referee: Erwin Blank

17 October 2025 11	Jong Ajax	2−2	Jong PSV	Duivendrecht
20:00 CEST	Ünüvar 54'; O'Niel (yellow card) 74'; Steur 90+2'; Butera (yellow card) 90+4'	Report	Abed 22'; Van den Berg (yellow card) 45'; Bawuah (yellow card) 55'; Van Duiven 77', (yellow card) 86'	Stadium: Sportpark De Toekomst; Attendance: 3,664; Referee: Boyd van Kommer

21 October 2025 12	TOP Oss	1−1	Jong Ajax	Oss
20:00 CEST	Hinoke 12'; Mol (yellow card) 82'; Esajas (yellow card) 35'	Report	Z. Ouazane (yellow card) 11'; Butera (yellow card) 69'; Abildgaard 74'; Peters (yellow card) 78'	Stadium: Frans Heesen Stadion; Attendance: 1,679; Referee: Joshua Kuipers

24 October 2025 13	Jong Ajax	0−1	FC Emmen	Duivendrecht
20:00 CEST	Vink (yellow card) 45+1'; Muzungu (yellow card) 74'	Report	Mulder (yellow card) 56', (goal) 81'	Stadium: Sportpark De Toekomst; Attendance: 431; Referee: Niels Boel

1 November 2025 14	SC Cambuur	4−1	Jong Ajax	Leeuwarden
20:00 CET	Marsman 8'; Rölke 23'; Sjöstrand 66'; Henstra 90+3'	Report	Chourak 10'; Wolff (yellow card) 39'; Vink (yellow card) 60'	Stadium: Kooi Stadion; Attendance: 14,133; Referee: Laurens Gerrets

7 November 2025 15	Jong Ajax	0−0	FC Dordrecht	Duivendrecht
20:00 CEST	Chourak (yellow card) 44'; Muzungu (yellow card) 47'; Butera (yellow card) 56'; Wolff (yellow card) 81'; O'Niel (yellow card) 90'	Report	Woudenberg (yellow card) 54'; Sunderland (yellow card) 56'; Rossi (yellow card) 59'; Vugts (yellow card) 76'	Stadium: Sportpark De Toekomst; Attendance: 655; Referee: Rick Sturm

21 November 2025 16	Jong Ajax	1−3	FC Eindhoven	Duivendrecht
20:00 CET	Bouwman 53'; Johnson (yellow card) 59'; Peters (yellow card) 77'	Report	Simons 6'; Deenen 59'; Douglas 75'	Stadium: Sportpark De Toekomst; Attendance: 639; Referee: Clay Ruperti

24 November 2025 17	Helmond Sport	2−1	Jong Ajax	Helmond
20:00 CET	Łukowicz 38', (yellow card) 74'; Makanza 51'; Ludwig (yellow card) 90+4'; Bergsen (yellow card) 90+5'	Report	Kalokoh 76'	Stadium: GS Staalwerken Stadion; Attendance: 1,696; Referee: Joshua Kuipers

1 December 2025 18	Jong Ajax	2−0	Vitesse	Duivendrecht
20:00 CET	Ünüvar (yellow card) 4'; O'Niel (yellow card) 24', (goal) 49'; Konadu 32'; Vink (yellow card) 65'	Report	Schikora (yellow card) 39'	Stadium: Sportpark De Toekomst; Attendance: 1,083; Referee: Thomas Hardeman

5 December 2025 19	Almere City	3−2	Jong Ajax	Almere
20:00 CET	Rijkhoff 34'; Druijf (penalty missed) 83'; De Haan (yellow card) 86'; Foah Sam 90+1', (yellow card) 90+4'; Kadile 90+3'	Report	Appiah (yellow card) 26'; Vink (yellow card) 38'; Konadu 81'; Kalisvaart 86' (o.g.)	Stadium: Yanmar Stadion; Attendance: 3,265; Referee: Kevin Puts

12 December 2025 20	MVV Maastricht	2−1	Jong Ajax	Maastricht
20:00 CET	Kleinen 33'; Tehubyuluw (yellow card) 60'; Van Dessel 79'; Sy (yellow card) 90+3'	Report	Ünüvar 59'; Reverson (yellow card) 78'	Stadium: De Geusselt; Attendance: 2,845; Referee: Rick Sturm

22 December 2025 21	Jong Ajax	0–2	RKC Waalwijk	Duivendrecht
20:00 CET	Muzungu (yellow card) 44'	Report	Cleonise 17'; Kuster 47'	Stadium: Sportpark De Toekomst; Attendance: 1,463; Referee: Laurens Gerrets

12 January 2026 22	Jong AZ	1−2	Jong Ajax	Alkmaar
20:00 CET	Budko (yellow card) 42'; Atikallah (yellow card) 43'; Schipper (yellow card) 54'; Robbemond 88'	Report	Van Duijl 34' (o.g.); Van der Lans (yellow card) 48'; O'Niel 55' (pen.); Alders (yellow card) 90+5'	Stadium: AFAS Trainingscomplex; Attendance: 575; Referee: Niels Boel

19 January 2026 23	Jong Ajax	2−2	Roda JC Kerkrade	Duivendrecht
20:00 CET	Peters 33'; Butera (yellow card) 40'; Chourak 55'; Ibrahimović (yellow card) 81'	Report	Cooper-Love 24'; Van den Hurk 35'; Nisbet (yellow card) 86'; Jansen (yellow card) 90'	Stadium: Sportpark De Toekomst; Attendance: 885; Referee: Wouter Wiersma

2 February 2026 25	Jong Ajax	2−1	Willem II	Duivendrecht
20:00 CEST	Vink 55'; O'Niel (yellow card) 77'; A. Ouzane 82', (yellow card) 90+3'	Report	Tjoe-A-On (yellow card) 70'; Haen 71'; Van Maarschalkerwaard (yellow card) 85'	Stadium: Sportpark De Toekomst; Attendance: 1,067; Referee: Joshua Kuipers

6 February 2026 26	De Graafschap	4−0	Jong Ajax	Doetinchem
20:00 CET	Niemeijer 14'; Eggens 47', 55'; Kwint 75'	Report	Butera (yellow card) 24'; Van der Vaart (yellow card) 45'	Stadium: De Vijverberg; Attendance: 10,778; Referee: Laurens Gerrets

16 February 2026 27	Jong Ajax	1−2	SC Cambuur	Duivendrecht
20:00 CET	Heerkens (yellow card) 16'; Konadu (penalty missed) 24'; Abdalla 84'	Report	Diemers 16' (pen.); Souren (yellow card) 37'; Van der Sande (yellow card) 65'; Galvez (yellow card) 74'; Baouf 88'; Henstra (yellow card) 90+1'	Stadium: Sportpark De Toekomst; Attendance: 1,129; Referee: Thomas Hardeman

20 February 2026 28	FC Dordrecht	0−1	Jong Ajax	Dordrecht
20:00 CET	Sunderland (yellow card) 57'; Van Asten (yellow card) 65'; M'Bemba (yellow card) 90'	Report	Abdalla (yellow card) 37'; Vink 78'	Stadium: M-Scores Stadion; Attendance: 3,000; Referee: Rick Sturm

23 February 2026 24	FC Emmen	0−0	Jong Ajax	Emmen
20:00 CET	Staring (yellow card) 47'; Bakir (yellow card) 52'; Søndergaard (yellow card) 66'; Gerezgiher (yellow card) 87'; Geypens (yellow card) 88'	Report	Johnson (yellow card) 57'	Stadium: De Oude Meerdijk; Attendance: 7,526; Referee: Clay Ruperti
Note: The game was scheduled originally for 24 January, but it was postponed due to a frozen pitch. Instead, Jong Ajax played a home friendly against FC Eindhoven. On 29 January the KNVB announced a new date for the game.

27 February 2026 29	Jong Ajax	5−1	Helmond Sport	Duivendrecht
20:00 CEST	Jetten 31'; Vink 45'; Abdalla (yellow card) 66'; A. Ouazane 68'; Acheampong (yellow card) 86'; Da Silva 90+2'; Nash 90+5'	Report	Van Den Eynden (yellow card) 48'; Geerts (yellow card) 53'; Koglin 56'	Stadium: Sportpark De Toekomst; Attendance: 1,047; Referee: Shona Shukrula

6 March 2026 30	FC Eindhoven	2−1	Jong Ajax	Eindhoven
20:00 CET	Janga 26'; Huisman 66'; Renfrum (yellow card) 71'; Munsters (yellow card) 90+2'	Report	Jetten (yellow card) 65'; A. Ouazane 78'	Stadium: Jan Louwers Stadion; Attendance: 2,669; Referee: Niels Boel

13 March 2026 31	Jong Ajax	3−2	FC Den Bosch	Duivendrecht
20:00 CET	A. Ouazane 14'; Vink 15'; O'Niel 32', (yellow card) 88'; Appiah (yellow card) 52'; Peters (yellow card) 78'; Van der Vaart (yellow card) 90+3'	Report	De Vries 1'; Boumassaoudi 81'	Stadium: Sportpark De Toekomst; Attendance: 1,048; Referee: Joshua Kuipers

17 March 2026 32	VVV-Venlo	0−1	Jong Ajax	Venlo
20:00 CET	Sbai (yellow card) 44'; Joosten (yellow card) 47'; Foor (yellow card) 89'	Report	A. Ouazane (yellow card) 39'; Kalokoh 67'; Acheampong (yellow card) 78'; Appiah (yellow card) 89'	Stadium: Covebo Stadion - De Koel; Attendance: 4,134; Referee: Kevin Puts

20 March 2026 33	Jong Ajax	0−2	Almere City	Duivendrecht
20:00 CET		Report	Van de Blaak 4'; De Haan 77'	Stadium: Sportpark De Toekomst; Attendance: 1,576; Referee: Rick Sturm

3 April 2026 34	ADO Den Haag	4−2	Jong Ajax	The Hague
20:00 CEST	Van Mieghem 31', (yellow card) 39'; Johnson 41' (o.g.); Kilo (yellow card) 45+3', (goal) 50'; De Ruijter (yellow card) 67'; Waem (yellow card) 73'; Van der Sloot 76'	Report	Vink (yellow card) 14'; O'Niel 29', (yellow card) 35'; Reverson (yellow card) 76'	Stadium: Bingoal Stadion; Attendance: 13,986; Referee: Clay Ruperti

6 April 2026 35	Vitesse	6−1	Jong Ajax	Arnhem
16:45 CEST	Schwarz (yellow card) 25'; Tahauia 45+2'; Zonneveld 45+4', 54'; Bannis 69'; Zumberi 82'; Marschalk 90+1'	Report	Butera (yellow card) 34'; Peters 69'	Stadium: GelreDome; Attendance: 17,290; Referee: Stan Teuben

13 April 2026 36	Jong Ajax	1−2	TOP Oss	Duivendrecht
20:00 CEST	Verkuijl (yellow card) 53'; Nash 75'	Report	Miguel 49'; Hinoke 81'; Doucouré (yellow card) 86'; Esajas (yellow card) 90+5'	Stadium: Sportpark De Toekomst; Attendance: 1,016; Referee: Thomas Hardeman

17 April 2026 37	Jong PSV	0−1	Jong Ajax	Eindhoven
20:00 CEST	Fernandez (yellow card) 50'	Report	Verkuijl (yellow card) 28'; O'Niel 57'; El Hani (yellow card) 90'	Stadium: De Herdgang; Attendance: 2,121; Referee: Joshua Kuipers

24 April 2026 38	Jong Ajax	0−2	Jong FC Utrecht	Duivendrecht
20:00 CEST	A. Ouazane (yellow card) 58'; Van der Vaart (yellow card) 77'	Report	Van der Wegen 19'; Laaouina (yellow card) 66'; El Arguioui 88', (yellow card) 88'	Stadium: Sportpark De Toekomst; Attendance: 1,625; Referee: Rick Sturm

== Statistics ==
=== Appearances and goals ===
No.	Pos.	Nat	Name	Total		Eerste Divisie		Discipline		
No.	Pos.	Nat	Name	Apps	Goals	Apps	Goals	Yellow card	Second yellow card	Red card
	GK	(Netherlands) NED	Paul Reverson	16	0	16	0	2	0	0
	GK	(Netherlands) NED	Aymean El Hani	4	0	3+1	0	0	0	0
	DF	(Netherlands) NED	Gerald Alders	10	0	9+1	0	1	0	0
	DF	(Netherlands) NED	Avery Appiah	33	0	32+1	0	4	0	0
	DF	(Belgium) BEL	Ethan Butera	26	0	21+5	0	7	0	0
	DF	(Netherlands) NED	Lucas Jetten	27	1	18+9	1	2	0	0
	DF	(Netherlands) NED	Mylo van der Lans	25	0	21+4	0	1	0	0
	DF	(France) FRA	Marvyn Muzungu	27	0	22+5	0	3	0	0
	DF	(Netherlands) NED	Ryan van de Pavert	10	0	4+6	0	1	0	0
	MF	(Netherlands) NED	Mohamed Abdalla	15	1	11+4	1	2	0	0
	MF	(Netherlands) NED	Jinairo Johnson	29	0	25+4	0	3	0	0
	MF	(Italy) ITA	Luca Messori	17	0	1+16	0	0	0	0
	MF	(Netherlands) NED	Don O'Niel	37	8	34+3	8	6	0	0
	MF	(Morocco) MAR	Abdellah Ouazane	25	4	17+8	4	3	0	0
	MF	(Netherlands) NED	Tijn Peters	31	2	27+4	2	3	0	0
	MF	(Netherlands) NED	Damian van der Vaart	22	0	5+17	0	3	0	0
	MF	(Netherlands) NED	Mark Verkuijl	11	0	8+3	0	3	0	0
	MF	(Netherlands) NED	Kayden Wolff	25	5	18+7	5	2	0	0
	FW	(Netherlands) NED	David Kalokoh	9	2	2+7	2	0	0	0
	FW	(Netherlands) NED	Pharell Nash	19	2	7+12	2	0	0	0
	FW	(Morocco) MAR	Zakaria Ouazane	13	1	3+10	1	1	0	0
	FW	(Netherlands) NED	Emre Ünüvar	13	4	7+6	4	2	0	0
	FW	(Netherlands) NED	Skye Vink	30	6	22+8	6	4	0	0
First team players who have made appearances for reserve squad:
	GK	(Netherlands) NED	Joeri Heerkens	19	0	19	0	1	0	0
	DF	(Netherlands) NED	Aaron Bouwman	6	1	6	1	0	0	0
	DF	(Turkey) TUR	Ahmetcan Kaplan	3	1	3	1	0	0	0
	MF	(Belgium) BEL	Rayane Bounida	10	2	10	2	0	0	0
	MF	(Belgium) BEL	Jorthy Mokio	2	0	2	0	0	0	0
	MF	(Netherlands) NED	Youri Regeer	1	0	1	0	0	0	0
	MF	(Netherlands) NED	Sean Steur	11	1	10+1	1	0	0	0
	FW	(Sweden) SWE	Maximilian Ibrahimović	4	0	0+4	0	0	0	0
	FW	(Netherlands) NED	Don-Angelo Konadu	17	3	16+1	3	0	0	0
Youth players who have made appearances for reserve squad:
	DF	(Netherlands) NED	Jahyendrow Amour	1	0	1	0	0	0	0
	DF	(Netherlands) NED	Luuk Beekman	1	0	0+1	0	0	0	0
	DF	(Netherlands) NED	Sinclair de Falco	2	0	2	0	0	0	0
	DF	(Netherlands) NED	Leroy Fränkel	3	0	0+3	0	0	0	0
	DF	(Netherlands) NED	Kennynho Kasanwirjo	15	0	4+11	0	0	0	0
	MF	(Denmark) DEN	Lasse Abildgaard	4	1	0+4	1	0	0	0
	MF	(Netherlands) NED	Levi Acheampong	4	0	0+4	0	2	0	0
	MF	(Netherlands) NED	Nnamdi Koka	1	0	0+1	0	0	0	0
	MF	(Netherlands) NED	Thijmen Romers	4	0	0+4	0	0	0	0
	FW	(Netherlands) NED	Paulo da Silva	2	1	0+2	1	0	0	0
Players sold or loaned out after the start of the season:
	GK	(England) ENG	Charlie Setford	0	0	0	0	0	0	0
	MF	(Netherlands) NED	Nassef Chourak	13	2	10+3	2	1	0	0
	MF	(Poland) POL	Jan Faberski	1	0	1	0	0	0	0

Last updated: 24 April 2026
Source: Competitions

=== Clean sheets ===
Rank	Pos	Nat	Name	Eerste Divisie	Matches
1	GK	(Netherlands)	Joeri Heerkens	4	19
2	GK	(Netherlands)	Paul Reverson	2	16
3	GK	(Netherlands)	Aymean El Hani	1	4
Totals				7	38

Last updated: 24 April 2026
