= List of Dutch football transfers winter 2025–26 =

This is a list of Dutch football transfers for the 2025–26 winter transfer window. Only transfers featuring Eredivisie are listed.

== Eredivisie ==
Note: Flags indicate national team as has been defined under FIFA eligibility rules. Players may hold more than one non-FIFA nationality.

=== PSV ===
In:

No.	Pos.	Nation	Player

Out:

No.	Pos.	Nation	Player
39	DF	BFA	Adamo Nagalo (on loan to (Turkey) Konyaspor)

=== Ajax ===
In:

No.	Pos.	Nation	Player
7	FW	ARG	Maher Carrizo (from (Argentina) Vélez Sarsfield)
26	GK	IDN	Maarten Paes (from (United States) FC Dallas)
27	FW	SWE	Maximilian Ibrahimović (on loan from (Italy) Milan)
32	DF	JPN	Takehiro Tomiyasu (free agent)
47	DF	UKR	Oleksandr Zinchenko (from (England) Arsenal, previously on loan at (England) Nottingham Forest)

Out:

No.	Pos.	Nation	Player
7	FW	ESP	Raúl Moro (to (Spain) Osasuna)
8	MF	NED	Kenneth Taylor (to (Italy) Lazio)
16	MF	ENG	James McConnell (loan return to (England) Liverpool)
21	MF	NED	Branco van den Boomen (on loan to (France) Angers)
22	GK	NED	Remko Pasveer (to Heracles Almelo)
—	DF	ARG	Gastón Ávila (on loan to (Argentina) Rosario Central, previously on loan at (Brazil) Fortaleza)

=== Feyenoord ===
In:

No.	Pos.	Nation	Player
8	DF	NED	Jeremiah St. Juste (from (Portugal) Sporting CP)
13	GK	GER	Steven Benda (on loan from (England) Fulham, previously on loan at (England) Millwall)
19	FW	ENG	Raheem Sterling (free agent)
20	DF	NED	Mats Deijl (from Go Ahead Eagles)

Out:

No.	Pos.	Nation	Player
1	GK	NED	Justin Bijlow (to (Italy) Genoa)
8	MF	NED	Quinten Timber (to (France) Marseille)
10	FW	CAN	Cyle Larin (loan return to (Spain) Mallorca)
36	FW	NED	Jaden Slory (on loan to Go Ahead Eagles)
43	DF	NED	Jan Plug (on loan to Dordrecht)
—	GK	BUL	Plamen Andreev (on loan to (Poland) Lech Poznań, previously on loan at (Spain) Racing Santander)
—	DF	NED	Neraysho Kasanwirjo (on loan to Fortuna Sittard, previously on loan at (Norway) Molde)
—	MF	CIV	Chris-Kévin Nadje (on loan to (United States) Monterey Bay, previously on loan at Excelsior)
—	FW	ARG	Julián Carranza (to (Mexico) Necaxa, previously on loan at (England) Leicester City)

=== Utrecht ===
In:

No.	Pos.	Nation	Player
11	FW	SWE	Jesper Karlsson (on loan from (Italy) Bologna, previously on loan at (Scotland) Aberdeen)
18	FW	UKR	Artem Stepanov (on loan from (Germany) Bayer Leverkusen, previously on loan at (Germany) 1. FC Nürnberg)
77	FW	ESP	Ángel Alarcón (on loan from (Portugal) Porto B)

Out:

No.	Pos.	Nation	Player
5	DF	ISL	Kolbeinn Finnsson (on loan to (Norway) Vålerenga)
6	MF	NED	Davy van den Berg (on loan to (England) Luton Town)
11	FW	NED	Noah Ohio (on loan to (Spain) Real Valladolid)
19	FW	NED	Jesse van de Haar (on loan to (Belgium) Beveren)
26	FW	IDN	Miliano Jonathans (on loan to Excelsior)
55	DF	ENG	Derry Murkin (to (England) Derby County)
—	DF	ISL	Kolbeinn Finnsson (to (Norway) Vålerenga, previously on loan)

=== AZ ===
In:

No.	Pos.	Nation	Player
18	DF	JPN	Rion Ichihara (from (Japan) RB Omiya Ardija)
19	FW	NED	Jizz Hornkamp (from Heracles Almelo)
24	FW	NED	Ayoub Oufkir (from Sparta Rotterdam)

Out:

No.	Pos.	Nation	Player
21	MF	NED	Dave Kwakman (on loan to Volendam)
25	FW	NED	Lequincio Zeefuik (on loan to Heracles Almelo)
—	FW	SWE	Mayckel Lahdo (on loan to (Sweden) Brøndby, previously on loan at (France) Nantes)

=== Twente ===
In:

No.	Pos.	Nation	Player

Out:

No.	Pos.	Nation	Player
5	DF	NED	Bas Kuipers (on loan to (Portugal) Arouca)
37	FW	TUR	Naci Ünüvar (on loan to Heracles Almelo)
—	MF	TUN	Sayfallah Ltaief (on loan to (Germany) Greuther Fürth, previously on loan at Sparta Rotterdam)

=== Go Ahead Eagles ===
In:

No.	Pos.	Nation	Player
2	DF	ISL	Alfons Sampsted (from (England) Birmingham City)
9	FW	ISL	Stefán Ingi Sigurðarson (from (Norway) Sandefjord)
19	FW	NED	Jaden Slory (on loan from Feyenoord)
20	DF	NED	Eus Waayers (from Jong PSV)

Out:

No.	Pos.	Nation	Player
2	DF	NED	Mats Deijl (to Feyenoord)
6	MF	NED	Calvin Twigt (on loan to Willem II)
9	FW	NED	Milan Smit (on loan to (England) Stoke City)
14	FW	SWE	Oscar Pettersson (to (Sweden) GAIS)
20	MF	BEL	Xander Blomme (on loan to FC Eindhoven)

=== NEC ===
In:

No.	Pos.	Nation	Player
8	MF	NOR	Isak Hansen-Aarøen (from (Germany) Werder Bremen)
9	FW	BRA	Danilo (on loan from (Scotland) Rangers)
19	MF	ISL	Willum Þór Willumsson (from (England) Birmingham City)

Out:

No.	Pos.	Nation	Player
8	MF	GRE	Argyris Darelas (on loan to Dordrecht)
9	FW	JPN	Kento Shiogai (to VfL Wolfsburg)
21	MF	ESP	Rober (on loan to (Spain) Real Zaragoza)
26	FW	NED	Luc Nieuwenhuijs (on loan to Jong Sparta)
32	MF	NED	Vito van Crooij (on loan to Sparta Rotterdam)
33	DF	NED	Yousri Sbai (on loan to VVV-Venlo)
—	FW	NOR	Lars Olden Larsen (to (Norway) Tromsø, previously on loan)

=== Heerenveen ===
In:

No.	Pos.	Nation	Player
11	MF	BEL	Luca Oyen (from (Belgium) Genk)
18	FW	NOR	Lasse Nordås (on loan from (England) Luton Town)
27	FW	CZE	Václav Sejk (from (Czech Republic) Sparta Prague, previously on loan)

Out:

No.	Pos.	Nation	Player
5	DF	POL	Paweł Bochniewicz (to (Poland) Górnik Zabrze)
27	FW	CZE	Václav Sejk (to (Czech Republic) Sigma Olomouc)

=== PEC Zwolle ===
In:

No.	Pos.	Nation	Player
5	DF	NED	Tijs Velthuis (on loan from Sparta Rotterdam)
9	MF	DEN	Younes Namli (from (France) Le Havre)

Out:

No.	Pos.	Nation	Player
11	FW	BEL	Dylan Mbayo (on loan to (France) Laval)
77	FW	GHA	Braydon Manu (to (Cyprus) Akritas Chlorakas)

=== Fortuna Sittard ===
In:

No.	Pos.	Nation	Player
5	MF	MAR	Yassin Oukili (from (Portugal) Casa Pia)
21	DF	NED	Neraysho Kasanwirjo (on loan from Feyenoord, previously on loan at (Norway) Molde)
32	GK	NED	Nick Marsman (free agent)
70	MF	NED	Lance Duijvestijn (on loan from Sparta Rotterdam)

Out:

No.	Pos.	Nation	Player
11	FW	FRA	Makan Aïko (to (Portugal) Tondela)
21	DF	SRB	Marko Kerkez (to (Greece) Aris Thessaloniki)
26	DF	GNB	Houboulang Mendes (to (Switzerland) Servette)
80	MF	SUI	Ryan Fosso (to (Austria) Sturm Graz)

=== Sparta Rotterdam ===
In:

No.	Pos.	Nation	Player
—	MF	NED	Vito van Crooij (on loan from NEC)
—	MF	NOR	Alwande Roaldsøy (from (Norway) Molde)
—	FW	FIN	Casper Terho (on loan from (Belgium) OH Leuven)
—	FW	NED	Milan Zonneveld (from Telstar)

Out:

No.	Pos.	Nation	Player
—	FW	NED	Ayoub Oufkir (to AZ)
—	DF	NED	Tijs Velthuis (on loan to PEC Zwolle)
—	MF	NED	Lance Duijvestijn (on loan to Fortuna Sittard)
—	FW	ISL	Nökkvi Þeyr Þórisson (on loan to Telstar)
—	MF	TUN	Sayfallah Ltaief (loan return to Twente)

=== Groningen ===
In:

No.	Pos.	Nation	Player

Out:

No.	Pos.	Nation	Player
11	FW	FRA	Noam Emeran (on loan to Emmen)
—	FW	NOR	Kristian Lien (to (Sweden) Djurgården, previously on loan at (Norway) HamKam)

=== Heracles Almelo ===
In:

No.	Pos.	Nation	Player
9	FW	TUR	Naci Ünüvar (on loan from Twente)
14	MF	SWE	Erik Ahlstrand (on loan from (Germany) FC St. Pauli)
20	MF	AUS	Rhys Bozinovski (from (Australia) Perth Glory)
22	GK	NED	Remko Pasveer (from Ajax)
25	FW	NED	Lequincio Zeefuik (on loan from ΑΖ)

Out:

No.	Pos.	Nation	Player
9	FW	NED	Jizz Hornkamp (to AZ)
22	DF	ITA	Lorenzo Milani (on loan to (Italy) Bra)
—	FW	ITA	Antonio Satriano (to (Italy) Pro Vercelli, previously on loan at Emmen)

=== NAC Breda ===
In:

No.	Pos.	Nation	Player
19	FW	FRA	Amine Salama (on loan from (France) Reims)
24	FW	GHA	André Ayew (free agent)

Out:

No.	Pos.	Nation	Player
5	DF	NED	Terence Kongolo (to (Georgia (country)) Iberia 1999)
6	MF	NED	Casper Staring (to Emmen)
17	FW	NED	Sydney van Hooijdonk (to (Portugal) Estrela da Amadora)
18	DF	NED	Daan van Reeuwijk (retired)
23	FW	NED	Dion Versluis (on loan to Kozakken Boys)

=== Volendam ===
In:

No.	Pos.	Nation	Player
4	MF	CUW	Juninho Bacuna (on loan from (Turkey) Gaziantep)
23	MF	NED	Dave Kwakman (on loan from AZ)
29	FW	BEL	Benjamin Pauwels (on loan from (Spain) Leganés)
77	FW	MAR	Bilal Ould-Chikh (on loan from (Morocco) Raja CA)

Out:

No.	Pos.	Nation	Player
4	DF	NED	Xavier Mbuyamba (to (Austria) LASK)
19	FW	IDN	Mauro Zijlstra (to (Indonesia) Persija Jakarta)
33	MF	ENG	Kiano Dyer (loan return to (England) Chelsea)
—	DF	NED	Daan Steur (on loan to RKAV Volendam, previously on loan at IJsselmeervogels)

=== Excelsior ===
In:

No.	Pos.	Nation	Player
7	MF	SWE	Emil Hansson (from (England) Birmingham City, previously on loan at (England) Blackpool)
22	DF	NED	Hamdi Akujobi (free agent)
26	FW	IDN	Miliano Jonathans (on loan from Utrecht)

Out:

No.	Pos.	Nation	Player
7	FW	KOR	Yoon Do-young (loan return to (England) Brighton & Hove Albion)
17	DF	BEL	Nolan Martens (on loan to De Graafschap)
18	MF	CIV	Chris-Kévin Nadje (loan return to Feyenoord)
21	MF	USA	Zach Booth (on loan to (United States) Real Salt Lake)
22	FW	SRB	Stefan Mitrović (loan return to (Italy) Hellas Verona)
25	MF	NED	Stijn Middendorp (to (Cyprus) Anorthosis Famagusta)
38	GK	NED	Edwin Danquah (to ADO '20)

=== Telstar ===
In:

No.	Pos.	Nation	Player
3	DF	NED	Gerald Alders (on loan from Jong Ajax)
9	FW	NED	Jelani Seedorf (from Jong Sparta)
19	FW	ISL	Nökkvi Þeyr Þórisson (on loan from Sparta Rotterdam)
23	MF	NED	Cedric Hatenboer (on loan from (Belgium) Anderlecht)
37	FW	NED	Sem van Duijn (on loan from Jong AZ)

Out:

No.	Pos.	Nation	Player
9	FW	NED	Milan Zonneveld (to Sparta Rotterdam)
10	FW	NED	Mohamed Hamdaoui (to (Bahrain) Al-Riffa)
19	FW	NED	Sebastiaan Hagedoorn (to Jong Almere City)
26	DF	NED	Jaylan van Schooneveld (to (Gibraltar) Glacis United)
—	MF	NED	Remi van Ekeris (to Lisse, previously on loan)

== See also ==
- 2025–26 Eredivisie
