= Ünüvar =

Ünüvar is a surname. Notable people with the surname include:

- Emre Ünüvar (born 2008), Dutch football striker
- Naci Ünüvar (born 2003), Turkish football attacking midfielder
- Necdet Ünüvar (born 1960), Turkish politician
- Safiye Ünüvar, Ottoman educator
