= Don O'Niel =

Dutch association football player

Personal information
- Full name: Don-Delaiah Cassidy Sigayro O'Neil
- Date of birth: 11 August 2006 (age 20)
- Place of birth: Netherlands
- Position: Winger

Team information
- Current team: Al-Ahli

Youth career
- 2013-2024: AFC Ajax

Senior career*
Years	Team	Apps	(Gls)
2024–2026	Jong Ajax	38	(8)
2026–	Al-Ahli	0	(0)
- * Club domestic league appearances and goals as of 28 August 2026, 17:06 (UTC)

Don-Delaiah Cassidy Sigayro O'Niel (born 11 August 2006) is a Dutch professional footballer who plays as a winger for Qatar Stars League club Al-Ahli.

== Career ==
O'Neil joined the AFC Ajax youth academy when he was six years-old. He made his professional debut for Jong Ajax against Jong AZ in the Eerste Divisie on May 10, 2024, at the end of 2023–24 season. In August 2024, he signed a three-year professional contract with the club, with an option for two more years. On 18 August 2025, he scored his first Eerste Divisie goal for Jong Ajax in a 4–1 home win against Jong AZ. Throughout the 2025–26 season he scored eight goals in 37 league appearances for the club, and was credited with six assists.

In July 2026, despite having two years remaining in his contract, he signed for Qatar Stars League club Al-Ahli for an undisclosed fee.

== Style of play ==
Described as a winger, he has been praised by Ajax director of football Marijn Beuker for his speed and ability in one-on-one situations.
