= Lucas Jetten =

Footballer (born 2007)

Personal information
- Date of birth: 7 June 2007 (age 19)
- Place of birth: Natalspruit, South Africa
- Height: 1.70 m (5 ft 7 in)
- Position: Left-back

Team information
- Current team: Cambuur
- Number: 23

Youth career
- –2015: Sporting Martinus
- 2015–2026: Ajax

Senior career*
Years	Team	Apps	(Gls)
2024–2026	Jong Ajax	60	(1)
2026–	Cambuur	0	(0)

International career^{‡}
2022	Netherlands U16	2	(0)
2023	Netherlands U17	5	(0)
2025–	Netherlands U19	4	(0)
2025–	Netherlands U21	1	(0)
- * Club domestic league appearances and goals as of 4 April 2026 ‡ National team caps and goals as of 4 April 2026

Lucas Jetten (born 7 June 2007) is a professional footballer who plays as a left-back for Eredivisie club Cambuur. Born in South Africa, he represents the Netherlands at youth international level.

== Early life ==
Jetten was born in Natalspruit, South Africa. He was adopted as a child and raised in the Netherlands. He comes from a footballing family from Uden; his adoptive great-grandfather, Noud Jetten, and great-uncle, Anton Jetten, both played football at a high amateur and semi-professional level. He is also a first cousin once removed (achterneef) of Dutch politician and Prime Minister Rob Jetten.

He began his youth football career at local amateur club Sporting Martinus before being scouted by the Ajax youth academy, joining the club in 2015. He progressed through the ranks alongside his long-time teammate Jinairo Johnson.

== Club career ==
=== Ajax ===
Operating primarily as an attacking left-back, Jetten progressed entirely through the Ajax youth system. He signed his first professional contract with the club in July 2023, agreeing to a deal running until June 2026.

His development within the academy was formally recognized when he was awarded the Abdelhak Nouri Trophy for the 2023–24 season. The award is given annually to the greatest talent in the Ajax academy, with Jetten succeeding previous winner Jorrel Hato.

Jetten was subsequently promoted to Jong Ajax, the club's reserve team playing in the professional Eerste Divisie. During the 2025–26 campaign, he emerged as a regular starter under managers Willem Weijs and Óscar García, approaching his 50th professional appearance for the team by the spring of 2026. He also featured prominently in the 2025–26 UEFA Youth League, scoring goals against Galatasaray and Qarabağ in the group stages. His consistent performances earned him a call-up to the Ajax first-team matchday squad by interim manager Fred Grim for an Eredivisie fixture against NEC.

=== Cambuur ===
On 27 May 2026, Jetten signed with recently promoted Eredivisie club Cambuur.

== International career ==
Eligible to represent both the Netherlands and South Africa, Jetten is a youth international for the Netherlands. He has represented the Dutch national setup at the under-16, under-17, and under-19 levels.

In mid-2025, shortly before his eighteenth birthday, Jetten was called up to the Netherlands U21 squad (Jong Oranje), making his debut at that age level.

== Career statistics ==
As of match played 3 April 2026

Appearances and goals by club, season and competition
Club	Season	League			National cup		Europe		Other		Total	
Club	Season	Division	Apps	Goals	Apps	Goals	Apps	Goals	Apps	Goals	Apps	Goals
Jong Ajax	2024–25	Eerste Divisie	27	0	—		—		—		27	0
Jong Ajax	2025–26	Eerste Divisie	30	1	—		—		—		30	1
Jong Ajax	Total		57	1	—		—		—		57	1
Career total			57	1	—		—		—		57	1

== Honours ==
Individual

- Abdelhak Nouri Trophy: 2023–24
