= Pharrell (name) =

Pharrell is a masculine given name. Notable people with the name include:

- Pharell Nash (born 2008), Dutch footballer
- Pharrell Brown (born 2005), English footballer
- Pharrell Johnson (born 2004), English footballer
- Pharrell Trainor (born 2006), Australian Samoan soccer player
- Pharrell Williams (born 1973), American singer-songwriter and record producer
- Pharrell Willis (born 2003), English footballer
