= Jinairo Johnson =

Dutch footballer (born 2007)

Personal information
- Full name: Jinairo Johnson
- Date of birth: 8 April 2007 (age 19)
- Place of birth: Amsterdam, Netherlands
- Height: 1.80 m (5 ft 11 in)
- Positions: Defensive midfielder; centre-back

Team information
- Current team: Ajax
- Number: 57

Youth career
- 2011–2013: Zeeburgia
- 2013–2025: Ajax

Senior career*
Years	Team	Apps	(Gls)
2025–	Jong Ajax	41	(0)
2026–	Ajax	1	(0)

International career^{‡}
2024	Netherlands U17	3	(0)
2024–2025	Netherlands U18	4	(0)
2025–	Netherlands U19	6	(1)
- * Club domestic league appearances and goals as of 28 April 2026 ‡ National team caps and goals as of 18 November 2025

Jinairo Johnson (born 8 April 2007) is a Dutch professional footballer who plays as a defensive midfielder or centre-back for Eredivisie club AFC Ajax and its reserve side Jong Ajax.

== Early life ==
Johnson was born in Amsterdam, Netherlands. He was raised in an athletic family of Jamaican and Nigerian descent.

== Club career ==
=== Early youth career ===
Johnson began playing grassroots youth football at local Amsterdam amateur club AVV Zeeburgia in 2011 at four years old. In 2013, he was scouted by AFC Ajax and entered the youth academy at De Toekomst, developing through the age-grade ranks as a defensive midfielder and central defender.

=== AFC Ajax ===
In April 2024, Johnson featured for Ajax U17 at the annual Future Cup tournament hosted at De Toekomst. He finished as joint top scorer and was named Player of the Tournament as Ajax won the competition. On 30 July 2024, Johnson signed his first professional contract with Ajax through June 2027.

Johnson made his professional debut with Jong Ajax in the Eerste Divisie on 13 January 2025, starting in a 2–1 away defeat to Jong AZ. On 26 August 2025, Ajax extended his contract through 30 June 2028, with Director of Football Marijn Beuker praising his defensive qualities, ball-carrying ability, and technical composure.

In January 2026, Johnson publicly outlined his primary ambition to make his official first-team debut for Ajax during the calendar year. Shortly thereafter, he realized this milestone by making his Eredivisie debut as a second-half substitute for the senior Ajax first team, before returning to feature for Jong Ajax the following day.

== International career ==
=== Netherlands youth ===
Johnson has represented the Netherlands across various youth international tiers. He made three appearances for the Netherlands U17 in 2024, featured for the Netherlands U18, and was subsequently promoted to the Netherlands U19 team in 2025.

=== Senior international eligibility ===
Eligible to represent the Netherlands, Jamaica, and Nigeria through birth and parentage, Johnson was included in the Jamaica provisional 60-man roster on 19 May 2025 ahead of the 2025 CONCACAF Gold Cup.

== Style of play ==
Primarily playing as a defensive midfielder who can also operate as a centre-back, Johnson is noted for his physical presence, tactical discipline, and strong ball-carrying abilities. Ajax technical director Marijn Beuker highlighted his defensive strength, technical proficiency, and driving dribbles out of defense.

== Career statistics ==
=== Club ===
As of 28 April 2026

Appearances and goals by club, season and competition
Club	Season	League			KNVB Cup		Europe		Other		Total	
Club	Season	Division	Apps	Goals	Apps	Goals	Apps	Goals	Apps	Goals	Apps	Goals
Jong Ajax	2024–25	Eerste Divisie	11	0	—		—		—		11	0
Jong Ajax	2025–26	Eerste Divisie	30	0	—		—		—		30	0
Jong Ajax	Total		41	0	—		—		—		41	0
Ajax	2025–26	Eredivisie	1	0	0	0	0	0	—		1	0
Career total			42	0	0	0	0	0	0	0	42	0
