= Abdellah Ouazane =

Moroccan footballer (born 2009)

Personal information
- Full name: Abdellah Ouazane
- Date of birth: 15 January 2009 (age 17)
- Place of birth: Zaandam, Netherlands
- Height: 1.83 m (6 ft 0 in)
- Positions: Central midfielder; attacking midfielder; winger

Team information
- Current team: Ajax
- Number: 68

Youth career
- 2014–2016: Zeeburgia
- 2016–2025: Ajax

Senior career*
Years	Team	Apps	(Gls)
2025–	Jong Ajax	25	(4)
2025–	Ajax	10	(2)

International career^{‡}
2023	Morocco U15	1	(0)
2024	Netherlands U15	3	(1)
2023–2024	Morocco U16	4	(1)
2024–2026	Morocco U17	24	(7)
2026–	Morocco U23	1	(0)
2026–	Morocco	3	(1)
Medal record
Representing Morocco
U-17 Africa Cup of Nations
Winner	2025 Morocco
- * Club domestic league appearances and goals as of 18:44, 25 October 2026 (UTC) ‡ National team caps and goals as of 23:30, 17 November 2026 (UTC)

Abdellah Ouazane (Arabic: عبد الله وزان; born 15 January 2009) is a professional footballer who plays as a attacking midfielder for Eredivisie club Ajax and its reserve squad Jong Ajax. Born in the Netherlands, he represents the Morocco national team.

== Early life ==
Ouazane was born in Zaandam, Netherlands, into a family of Moroccan origin. He began his youth football development locally with Zeeburgia, in 2014 before joining the youth setup of Ajax at age seven in 2016. He signed a sponsorship agreement with sports equipment manufacturer Adidas at age fifteen.

== Club career ==
=== Ajax Academy and failed Real Madrid transfer ===
Ouazane progressed rapidly through the youth ranks at De Toekomst, functioning primarily as a versatile midfielder capable of playing as an attacking midfielder, box-to-box midfielder, winger, or center forward. In 2025, a proposed transfer to Spanish club Real Madrid collapsed, after which Ouazane elected to commit his immediate professional development to Ajax.

=== Jong Ajax ===
Ahead of the 2025–26 season, Ouazane was integrated into Jong Ajax in the Eerste Divisie. On 26 August 2025, Ajax announced he had signed a professional contract running until 30 June 2028. He scored his first professional goal in February 2026 against Willem II, and scored again in a 3–2 victory over FC Den Bosch on 13 March 2026.

=== Ajax ===
On 17 December 2025, Ouazane made his competitive senior debut for Ajax in a KNVB Cup match against Excelsior. Replacing Youri Regeer in the 64th minute of a 7–2 victory, he became the sixth-youngest debutant in Ajax history at 16 years and 336 days.

During pre-season preparations in July 2026, manager Míchel praised his performances following a goal scored in a friendly against Burnley. Later that month, Ouazane made his European debut as a substitute during Ajax's UEFA Conference League qualification match against Vojvodina. A month later, on 16 August, he scored his first goal from a long-range shot in a 2–2 draw with Heerenveen.

== International career ==
Eligible to represent the Netherlands and Morocco through birth and ancestry, Ouazane initially played international youth football for both nations, earning three caps for the Netherlands U15 in 2024.

The Royal Moroccan Football Federation (FRMF) actively recruited Ouazane as part of an updated diaspora scouting program led by technical director Chris van Puyvelde targeting line-breaking, creative midfielders. Following a multi-year recruitment effort that included hosting Ouazane and his family at the King Mohammed VI Football Academy, Ouazane committed his international future to Morocco. He was honored at the Moroccan consulate in Amsterdam in November 2023 following his debut for Morocco U15.

At the 2025 U-17 Africa Cup of Nations, Ouazane scored two goals in the semi-final against Tanzania and led Morocco to the continental championship following a penalty shootout victory against Mali in the final. He was named the Man of the Competition (Player of the Tournament) by the Confederation of African Football. In November 2025, he featured for Morocco at the 2025 FIFA U-17 World Cup in Qatar.

In September 2026, Ouazane was called up to the Morocco senior team by head coach Mohamed Ouahbi for their 2027 Africa Cup of Nations qualification matches against Gabon and Lesotho.

== Style of play ==
Ouazane is an attacking midfielder who can also operate as a winger, central midfielder, or forward. Technical scouts and coaches have noted his dribbling ability, composure under physical pressure, press resistance, and vertical passing between opposition lines.

== Personal life ==
His older brother, Zakaria Ouazane, is also a professional footballer who came through the Ajax youth academy and played alongside him at Jong Ajax.

== Career statistics ==
=== Club ===
As of 25 October 2026

Appearances and goals by club, season and competition
Club	Season	League			KNVB Cup		Europe		Other		Total	
Club	Season	Division	Apps	Goals	Apps	Goals	Apps	Goals	Apps	Goals	Apps	Goals
Jong Ajax	2025–26	Eerste Divisie	25	4	—		—		—		25	4
Ajax	2025–26	Eredivisie	0	0	1	0	0	0	—		1	0
Ajax	2026–27	Eredivisie	10	2	0	0	7 (Note: Appearances in UEFA Conference League)	1	—		17	3
Ajax	Total		10	2	1	0	7	1	—		18	3
Career total			35	6	1	0	7	1	0	0	43	7

=== International ===
As of match played 17 November 2026

Appearances and goals by national team and year
National team	Year	Apps	Goals
Morocco	2026	3	1
Total		3	1

Scores and results list Morocco's goal tally first, score column indicates score after each Ouazane goal.

List of international goals scored by Abdellah Ouazane
No.	Date	Venue	Opponent	Score	Result	Competition
1	17 November 2026	Prince Moulay Abdellah Stadium, Rabat, Morocco	Niger	1–0	1–0	2027 Africa Cup of Nations qualification

== Honours ==
Morocco U17

- U-17 Africa Cup of Nations: 2025

Individual

- U-17 Africa Cup of Nations Man of the Competition: 2025
