= Maximilian Ibrahimović =

Swedish footballer (born 2006)

Personal information
- Full name: Maximilian Zlatan Seger Ibrahimović
- Date of birth: 22 September 2006 (age 20)
- Place of birth: Lund, Sweden
- Height: 1.85 m (6 ft 1 in)
- Positions: Attacking midfielder; winger

Team information
- Current team: Jong AZ

Youth career
- –2022: Hammarby IF
- 2022–2025: AC Milan

Senior career*
Years	Team	Apps	(Gls)
2025–2026	Milan Futuro (res.)	17	(5)
2025–2026	AC Milan	0	(0)
2026	→ Jong Ajax (loan)	4	(0)
2026–	Jong AZ	0	(0)

International career^{‡}
2024	Sweden U19	2	(0)
- * Club domestic league appearances and goals as of 23:30, 24 April 2026 (UTC) ‡ National team caps and goals as of 11 October 2024

Maximilian Zlatan Seger Ibrahimović (born 22 September 2006) is a Swedish professional footballer who plays as an attacking midfielder and winger for Eerste Divisie club Jong AZ.

== Early life ==
Ibrahimović was born on 22 September 2006 in Lund, Sweden. He is the son of Sweden international Zlatan Ibrahimović. Growing up, he practiced taekwondo and started playing football at the age of nine.

== Club career ==
=== AC Milan ===
As a youth player, Ibrahimović joined the youth academy of Allsvenskan side Hammarby IF. In 2022, he joined the youth academy of Serie A side AC Milan. He also trained with AC Milan's first team during a training session attended by his father, Zlatan Ibrahimović, who was recovering from injury in February 2023.

On 12 January 2025, he made his professional debut with Milan Futuro during a 5–1 home loss to Torres in the Serie C, where he recorded the assist for the team's only goal.

Ibrahimović received his first call-up with AC Milan for the 2–0 loss 2025–26 Supercoppa Italiana match against Napoli on 18 December 2025, as an unused substitute, however.

==== Loan to Ajax ====
On 14 January 2026, he joined Eredivisie club Ajax on a six-month loan, with the Dutch club holding an option to make the deal permanent for about €3.5 million. He initially joined the reserve team Jong Ajax.

=== AZ ===
On 18 July 2026, Ibrahimović joined Eredivisie club AZ, permanently for an undisclosed fee, ahead of the 2026–27 season. He was assigned to the reserve team Jong AZ that plays in the second-tier Eerste Divisie.

== International career ==
Ibrahimović has represented the Sweden national U19 team. He is also eligible to represent Bosnia and Herzegovina.

== Style of play ==
Ibrahimović is right-footed, he plays as an attacking midfielder and winger. Italian news website Gianluca Di Marzio wrote in 2024 that he "is a player all about dribbling and technique. He skips past his man and shoots at goal: a move that he does very well".

== Career statistics ==
As of match played 24 April 2026

Appearances and goals by club, season and competition
Club	Season	League			Cup (Note: Includes Coppa Italia Serie D)		Europe		Other		Total	
Club	Season	Division	Apps	Goals	Apps	Goals	Apps	Goals	Apps	Goals	Apps	Goals
Milan Futuro	2024–25	Serie C	1	0	0	0	—		—		1	0
Milan Futuro	2025–26	Serie D	16	5	1	0	—		—		17	5
Milan Futuro	Total		17	5	1	0	—		—		18	5
Jong Ajax (loan)	2025–26	Eerste Divisie	4	0	—		—		—		4	0
Career total			21	5	1	0	0	0	0	0	22	5
