= Skye Vink =

Dutch footballer (born 2006)

Personal information
- Date of birth: 1 July 2006 (age 20)
- Place of birth: Amsterdam, Netherlands
- Height: 1.87 m (6 ft 2 in)
- Position: Forward

Team information
- Current team: Cambuur
- Number: 9

Youth career
- –2017: Zeeburgia
- 2017–2025: Ajax

Senior career*
Years	Team	Apps	(Gls)
2023–2026	Jong Ajax	61	(7)
2026–	Cambuur	8	(0)

International career^{‡}
2021–2022	Netherlands U16	3	(1)
2022	Netherlands U17	2	(1)
2024	Netherlands U18	2	(1)
2024	Netherlands U19	2	(0)
- * Club domestic league appearances and goals as of 10:02, 4 November 2026 (UTC) ‡ National team caps and goals as of 12 October 2024

Skye Vink (born 1 July 2006) is a Dutch professional footballer who plays as a forward for Eredivisie club Cambuur.

== Club career ==
Born in Amsterdam, Vink began his youth career at local amateur club AVV Zeeburgia before being recruited into the youth academy of Ajax in 2017. He progressed through the club's youth system and signed his first professional contract with Ajax in early 2023.

Vink made his professional debut for Jong Ajax, the club's second team, on 25 August 2023 in a 4–2 Eerste Divisie away defeat against SC Cambuur. He started the match but was substituted off in the 23rd minute for Nassef Chourak after suffering a hamstring injury. Following his recovery, he gradually integrated into the squad and earned more consistent playing time during the 2024–25 season, scoring his first professional goal on 11 February 2025.

Ahead of the 2025–26 season, Ajax announced on 4 July 2025 that Vink had extended his contract with the club, committing to a new deal running until 30 June 2028. During the 2025–26 campaign, Vink emerged as a regular goalscorer for the team, netting six league goals by early April, including the opening goal in a match against title contenders ADO Den Haag on 3 April 2026.

On 6 June 2026, Vink signed a three-season contract with Cambuur, newly promoted to Eredivisie.

== International career ==
Vink is a youth international for the Netherlands. He has represented his country at various age levels, including the under-16, under-17, under-18, and under-19 national teams.

== Personal life ==
Vink is the son of former Dutch international footballer Marciano Vink, who notably played as a midfielder for Ajax, Genoa, and PSV Eindhoven.

== Career statistics ==
As of match played 31 October 2026

Appearances and goals by club, season and competition
Club	Season	League			National cup		Europe		Other		Total	
Club	Season	Division	Apps	Goals	Apps	Goals	Apps	Goals	Apps	Goals	Apps	Goals
Jong Ajax	2023–24	Eerste Divisie	9	0	—		—		—		9	0
Jong Ajax	2024–25	Eerste Divisie	22	1	—		—		—		22	1
Jong Ajax	2025–26	Eerste Divisie	30	6	—		—		—		30	6
Jong Ajax	Total		61	7	—		—		—		61	7
Cambuur	2026–27	Eredivisie	8	0	1	0	—		—		9	0
Career total			69	7	1	0	—		—		70	7
