= Luca Messori =

Italian-Dutch footballer

Personal information
- Full name: Luca Messori
- Date of birth: 25 October 2007 (age 19)
- Place of birth: Modena, Italy
- Positions: Attacking midfielder; winger

Team information
- Current team: Jong Ajax
- Number: 65

Youth career
- 2013–2014: BFC Bussum
- 2014–2020: Ajax
- 2020–2023: BFC Bussum
- 2023–2025: Ajax

Senior career*
Years	Team	Apps	(Gls)
2024–	Jong Ajax	17	(0)

International career^{‡}
2024–	Netherlands U19	4	(0)
- * Club domestic league appearances and goals as of 24 April 2026 ‡ National team caps and goals as of 25 March 2025

Luca Messori (born 25 October 2007) is a professional footballer who plays as an attacking midfielder or winger for Eerste Divisie club Jong Ajax. Born in Italy, he has represented the Netherlands at youth international level.

== Early life and youth career ==
Messori was born in Modena, Italy, to a Dutch mother and Italian former professional tennis player Filippo Messori. In 2013, at five years of age, he relocated with his family to the Netherlands, settling in Bussum, North Holland. He began his grassroots youth development with local amateur club BFC Bussum before being scouted by AFC Ajax in 2014 to join the Ajax Youth Academy ('De Toekomst').

In 2020, Messori opted to step away from the academy structure and returned to partner club BFC Bussum, where he spent three seasons playing amateur youth football. He rejoined Ajax's academy setup in 2023 at fifteen years of age. During the 2023–24 season, Messori featured in the Ajax U17 squad that won the international Future Cup tournament. On 3 May 2024, Ajax announced that Messori had signed his first professional contract, committing to the club through June 2027.

== Club career ==
=== Jong Ajax ===
Messori made his professional debut in the Eerste Divisie for reserve side Jong Ajax on 10 May 2024, coming on as a substitute for Yoram Boerhout in the 60th minute of a 1–4 home loss against Jong AZ.

Over the 2024–25 and 2025–26 seasons, Messori established himself as a member of the Jong Ajax squad. On 22 May 2026, Ajax announced that Messori had signed a two-year contract extension, committing to the Amsterdam club through 30 June 2029.

== International career ==
Eligible to represent both Italy and the Netherlands through dual citizenship, Messori chose to play for the Dutch national youth setup. In late 2024, he was selected for the Netherlands U19 team during the 2025 UEFA European Under-19 Championship qualification campaign, appearing in a 3–1 victory over Ukraine U19 as the squad secured advancement to the elite qualification round.

== Style of play ==
Operating primarily as an attacking midfielder or right winger, Messori is characterized by his pace, direct dribbling, spatial awareness between opposition lines, and creative passing range during transitions.

== Career statistics ==
As of match played 24 April 2026

Appearances and goals by club, season and competition
Club	Season	League			KNVB Cup		Europe		Other		Total	
Club	Season	Division	Apps	Goals	Apps	Goals	Apps	Goals	Apps	Goals	Apps	Goals
Jong Ajax	2023–24	Eerste Divisie	1	0	—		—		—		1	0
Jong Ajax	2024–25	Eerste Divisie	7	0	—		—		—		7	0
Jong Ajax	2025–26	Eerste Divisie	9	0	—		—		—		9	0
Career total			17	0	—		—		—		17	0
