= Mohamed Abdalla (footballer, born 2009) =

Dutch footballer (born 2009)

Personal information
- Date of birth: 19 October 2009 (age 17)
- Place of birth: Eindhoven, Netherlands
- Position: Midfielder

Team information
- Current team: Ajax
- Number: 67

Youth career
- –2023: FC Eindhoven
- 2023–2024: PSV
- 2024–: Ajax

Senior career*
Years	Team	Apps	(Gls)
2026–	Jong Ajax	15	(1)
2026–	Ajax	0	(0)

International career^{‡}
2024	Netherlands U15	3	(0)
2024–2025	Netherlands U16	7	(3)
2025–	Netherlands U17	8	(4)
- * Club domestic league appearances and goals as of 25 April 2026 ‡ National team caps and goals as of 31 March 2026

Mohamed Abdalla (born 19 October 2009) is a Dutch professional footballer who plays as a midfielder for Ajax.

== Early life ==
Abdalla was born on 19 October 2009 in Eindhoven, Netherlands. Of Sudanese descent through his parents, he has two younger brothers.

== Club career ==
As a youth player, Abdalla joined the youth academy of FC Eindhoven. Following his stint there, he joined the youth academy of PSV ahead of the 2023–24 season. One year later, he joined the youth academy of Ajax and was promoted to the club's senior team in 2026. He made his debut for the Ajax in the Conference League qualifier against FK Vojvodina in July 2026 in which he scored a goal, making him the youngest Dutch player to score in a European tournament.

== International career ==
Abdalla is a Netherlands youth international. During the autumn of 2025 and the spring of 2026, he played for the Netherlands national under-17 football team for 2026 UEFA European Under-17 Championship qualification.

== Style of play ==
Abdalla plays as a midfielder. Dutch news website VoetbalNieuws wrote in 2026 that he "is considered an all-round midfielder who can play in multiple positions in midfield, from a controlling role to box-to-box or more attacking... he is known for his dribbling, speed, and physical strength for his age. With long strides, he can cross the midfield and beat opponents".

== Career statistics ==
As of match played 23 July 2026

Appearances and goals by club, season and competition
Club	Season	League			KNVB Cup		Europe		Total	
Club	Season	Division	Apps	Goals	Apps	Goals	Apps	Goals	Apps	Goals
Jong Ajax	2025–26	Eerste Divisie	15	1	—		—		15	1
Ajax	2026–27	Eredivisie	0	0	0	0	1 (Note: Appearance in UEFA Conference League)	1	1	1
Career total			15	1	0	0	1	1	16	2
