= Paul Reverson =

Ghanaian footballer (born 2005)

Personal information
- Full name: Paul Peters Reverson
- Date of birth: 20 June 2005 (age 21)
- Place of birth: Amsterdam, Netherlands
- Height: 1.94 m (6 ft 4 in)
- Position: Goalkeeper

Team information
- Current team: De Graafschap (on loan from Jong Ajax)
- Number: 22

Youth career
- Zeeburgia
- 2013–2019: Ajax
- 2019–2022: AFC
- 2022–2024: Ajax

Senior career*
Years	Team	Apps	(Gls)
2023–	Jong Ajax	30	(0)
2026–	→ De Graafschap (loan)	0	(0)

International career^{‡}
2025–	Ghana U20	1	(0)
- * Club domestic league appearances and goals as of 28 April 2026 ‡ National team caps and goals as of 02:55, 27 August 2024 (UTC)

Paul Peters Reverson (born 20 June 2005) is a professional footballer who plays as a goalkeeper for Eerste Divisie club De Graafschap, on loan from Jong Ajax. Born in the Netherlands, he represents Ghana at the youth international level.

== Club career ==
Reverson started playing organised football in the youth set-up of Zeeburgia before joining the Ajax academy at the age of eight. He was released in 2019 and spent three years at AFC before returning to Ajax in 2022. On 6 August 2024, he signed his first professional contract with Ajax, running until 2027 with an option for two further seasons.

Reverson made his professional debut for Jong Ajax on 29 November 2024, in a 2–0 Eerste Divisie defeat away to Excelsior. Two days later, he was named among the substitutes for the Ajax first team in an Eredivisie match at NEC. During the 2025–26 season he alternated with fellow goalkeeper Joeri Heerkens, one starting for Jong Ajax while the other was on the bench for the first team. Over two seasons he made 30 Eerste Divisie appearances for Jong Ajax without playing for the first team.

On 1 September 2026, Reverson joined De Graafschap on loan until the end of the 2026–27 season, with the deal including an option to buy; his Ajax contract ran until 30 June 2027.

== International career ==
Born in the Netherlands to Ghanaian parents, Reverson holds dual Dutch and Ghanaian citizenship. In May 2025 he debuted with the Ghana U20s in a friendly loss to the Morocco U20s.

In May 2026, Reverson received his maiden call-up to Ghana's senior national team as part of the first squad invited by recently appointed head coach Carlos Queiroz.

== Personal life ==
Paul is the younger brother of the footballer Damienus Reverson.
