= Ethan Butera =

Belgian footballer (born 2006)

Personal information
- Date of birth: 16 April 2006 (age 20)
- Place of birth: Uccle, Belgium
- Height: 1.74 m (5 ft 9 in)
- Position: Defender

Team information
- Current team: Hasselt
- Number: 74

Youth career
- –2016: RWDM
- 2016–2023: Anderlecht
- 2023–: Ajax

Senior career*
| Years | Team | Apps | (Gls) |
| 2022–2023 | RSCA Futures | 14 | (0) |
| 2023–2026 | Jong Ajax | 28 | (0) |
| 2026– | Hasselt | 4 | (0) |

International career^{‡}
| 2021–2022 | Belgium U16 | 11 | (0) |
| 2022 | Belgium U17 | 4 | (0) |
- * Club domestic league appearances and goals as of 19 September 2026 ‡ National team caps and goals as of 1 November 2022

Ethan Butera (born 16 April 2006) is a Belgian professional footballer who plays as a defender for Challenger Pro League club Hasselt.

== Club career ==
=== Anderlecht ===
Butera has been with Anderlecht since under-11 level. On 6 May 2021, he signed his first professional contract with Anderlecht. The contract ran until the conclusion of the 2023–24 season with the club's Jean Kindermans describing him as a "strong left footed centre-back who can also play in midfield, a natural leader with a bright future". Butera made his debut in the Challenger Pro League on 14 August. 2022 in a 0–0 home draw against Deinze. Butera was identified as one of the core reasons RSCA Futures were the last unbeaten side in Belgian football during the 2022–23 season. Such was his form he was linked with potential transfers to Juventus, Ajax and Atalanta.

=== Ajax ===
On 1 September 2023, Butera signed a three-year contract with AFC Ajax, joining the reserve team Jong Ajax for the 2023–24 Eerste Divisie season.

== International career ==
In 2022, Butera represented Belgium at under-17 level. Prior to this, he captained the Belgian under-16 team.

== Personal life ==
He is the son of Belgian former professional footballer Jonathan Butera.

== Career statistics ==
As of match played 26 November 2022

Appearances and goals by club, season and competition
| Club | Season | League | | | Cup | | Europe | | Other | | Total | |
| Club | Season | Division | Apps | Goals | Apps | Goals | Apps | Goals | Apps | Goals | Apps | Goals |
|---|---|---|---|---|---|---|---|---|---|---|---|---|
| RSCA Futures | 2022–23 | Challenger Pro League | 14 | 0 | — | | — | | — | | 14 | 0 |
| Jong Ajax | 2023–24 | Eerste Divisie | 0 | 0 | — | | — | | — | | 0 | 0 |
| Career total | | | 14 | 0 | 0 | 0 | 0 | 0 | 0 | 0 | 14 | 0 |
