= Future Cup =

International youth football tournament

ABN AMRO Future Cup
- Founded: 2010
- Region: Worldwide
- Teams: 8
- Current champions: RSC Anderlecht (4th title)
- Most championships: Ajax (7 titles)
- Broadcaster(s): ESPN; Eurosport; Ziggo Sport
- Website: Official website

The Future Cup (officially known as the ABN AMRO Future Cup, and previously known as the AEGON Future Cup) is an annual friendly international youth tournament which is organized by the Dutch football club AFC Ajax. The tournament is created for under-17 youth teams, and is held at De Toekomst, every year during the Easter weekend. The tournament has been contested by some of the strongest under-17 teams in football, with FC Barcelona, Manchester United and Bayern Munich amongst the participating clubs. The first five editions of the tournament were named after its main sponsor, the insurance company AEGON, before the Dutch state-owned bank ABN AMRO took over as the main sponsor of the event. The tournament is broadcast on television in over 59 countries via Eredivisie Live, Eurosport and Fox Sports. Also is played in series Jamie Johnson

== Qualification ==
8 teams participate in the Future Cup every year. Since Ajax are the tournament hosts, they are automatically entered, leaving 7 additional places available in the tournament. Six of the spots can be filled with a simple registration of an under-17 team from any club, while national teams are also able to register, such as the China U-17 team did when it competed in the first edition of the competition. The eighth and final position is filled by the winners of the Brazilian 'Craques Mongeral AEGON Future Cup – Um Torneio do Ajax' a parallel running competition for under-17 youth teams in South America which shares the same sponsor. The winner of that tournament is automatically seeded for the Future Cup in Amsterdam the next year, completing the 8 participants in the Cup challenge.

== Format ==
The draw takes place ahead of the last home match of the Ajax first team ahead of the Future Cup. The 8 teams are then divided up into two groups during halftime of this match. The opening ceremony of the tournament takes place on the Friday evening before Easter, while the first matches are played on Holy Saturday. The first two group stage matches are played for each team on this day, while the last two group stage matches are then contested on Easter Sunday. The finals are played on Monday, the second Easter day. The day starts with the matches for the 7th and 8th place, which are contested by the two teams who finished bottom of their groups. Afterwards the two semi-finals are played. The group winners of each group compete against the second place team of the other group, and after the two semi-finals the matches for 5th and 6th place are contested against the third place team from each group. The matches for 3rd and 4th place are then contested amongst the losers of the Semi-finals, which is concluded by the Cup final, deciding the 1st and 2nd place. The awards and trophies are awarded directly after the Final, at which all teams and coaches are present.

== Finals ==
Statistics accurate as of ABN AMRO Future Cup 2024.

Year	Date	Winner	Result	Finalist
2026	6 April 2026	Anderlecht (Belgium)	2-0	(Spain) Real Madrid
2025	20 April 2025	Ajax (Netherlands)	1-0	(Germany) Bayern Munich
2024	1 April 2024	Ajax (Netherlands)	2–1	(Serbia) Partizan
2023	10 April 2023	Nordsjælland (Denmark)	3–0	(Netherlands) Ajax
2020–22	—	–	Cancelled*	–
2019	22 April 2019	Juventus (Italy)	2–1	(Netherlands) Ajax
2018	2 April 2018	Ajax (Netherlands)	2–0	(Italy) Juventus
2017	17 April 2017	Ajax (Netherlands)	2–0	(Germany) Bayern Munich
2016	28 March 2016	Arsenal (England)	0–0 (4-3 pen.)	(Belgium) Anderlecht
2015	6 April 2015	Anderlecht (Belgium)	0–0 (4-3 pen.)	(Netherlands) Ajax
2014	21 April 2014	Ajax (Netherlands)	2–1	(England) Liverpool
2013	1 April 2013	Anderlecht (Belgium)	2–0	(Netherlands) Ajax
2012	9 April 2012	Ajax (Netherlands)	2–2 (5–3 pen.)	(England) Manchester United
2011	25 April 2011	Anderlecht (Belgium)	1–0	(Netherlands) Ajax
2010	5 April 2010	Ajax (Netherlands)	1–0	China U-17

- Cancelled due to the COVID-19 pandemic in the Netherlands

== Prizes ==
The winner of the Future Cup are obvious winners of the tournament. For this information please see the next segment below. Other prizes are however awarded in conclusion, which are handed out by prominent former and current Ajax members, with Frank de Boer, Martin Jol and Luis Suárez amongst those who have awarded the trophies. The man of the tournament is selected and awarded the adidas Best player of ABN AMRO Future Cup award. Below is a list of the prize winners over the years:

Year	Player	Club
2026	(Morocco) Rami Lougmani	(Belgium) Anderlecht
2025	(Netherlands) Pharell Nash	(Netherlands) Ajax
2024	(Netherlands) Jinairo Johnson	(Netherlands) Ajax
2023	(Denmark) Villum Berthelsen	(Denmark) Nordsjælland
2019	(Belgium) Anouar Ait El Hadj	(Belgium) Anderlecht
2018	(Turkey) Naci Ünüvar	(Netherlands) Ajax
2017	(Netherlands) Ryan Gravenberch	(Netherlands) Ajax
2016	(Spain) Riqui Puig	(Spain) Barcelona
2015	(Netherlands) Matthijs de Ligt	(Netherlands) Ajax
2014	(Netherlands) Abdelhak Nouri	(Netherlands) Ajax
2013	(Belgium) Nabil Jaadi	(Belgium) Anderlecht
2012	(Netherlands) Queensy Menig	(Netherlands) Ajax
2011	(Belgium) Dennis Praet	(Belgium) Anderlecht
2010	(Netherlands) Davy Klaassen	(Netherlands) Ajax

Every year the prize adidas Top Scorer of ABN AMRO Future Cup is awarded to the top-scorer of the tournament. Since the 2023 tournament, the award has been renamed the Noah Gesser Trophy in honour of the U16 Ajax talent who had died in a car accident in 2021. Below is a list of the top-scorers for each year:

Year	Topscorer	Club	Goals
2026	(Morocco) Rami Lougmani	(Belgium) Anderlecht	5
2025	(France) Pierre Mounguengue (Germany) Yll Gashi	(France) Paris Saint-German (Germany) Bayern Munich	4
2024	(Portugal) Rafael Camacho (France) Oumar Camara (Netherlands) Jinairo Johnson (England) Divine Mukasa (Serbia) Lazar Radosavljević	(Portugal) Sporting CP (France) Paris Saint-German (Netherlands) Ajax (England) Manchester City (Serbia) Partizan	3
2023	(Switzerland) Winsley Boteli	(Germany) Borussia Mönchengladbach	4
2019	(Belgium) Anouar Ait El Hadj	(Belgium) Anderlecht	4
2018	(Turkey) Naci Ünüvar	(Netherlands) Ajax	5
2014	(England) Oluwaseyi Ojo (Wales) Harry Wilson	(England) Liverpool	4
2013	(Czech Republic) Václav Černý (Belgium) Aaron Leya Iseka	(Netherlands) Ajax (Belgium) Anderlecht	3
2012	(Netherlands) Elton Acolatse (Brazil) Ademir Candido (Italy) Marco Pinato (Turkey) Alperen Doğan	(Netherlands) Ajax (Brazil) Desportivo (Italy) Milan (Turkey) Beşiktaş JK	3
2011	(South Africa) Nicholas Pasifakis (United States) Patrick Foss	(South Africa) Ajax Cape Town (United States) D.C. United	4
2010	(Germany) Dominik Goßner	(Germany) Bayern Munich	6

== Statistics ==
=== Appearances and best results ===
Statistics accurate as of ABN AMRO Future Cup 2024.

Nr.	Club	Apps	First App.	Best result
1.	(Netherlands) Ajax	12	2010	Winners
1.	(Belgium) Anderlecht	12	2010	Winners
1.	(Italy) Juventus	5	2015	Winners
1.	(England) Arsenal	2	2016	Winners
1.	(Denmark) Nordsjælland	2	2023	Winners
2.	(Germany) Bayern Munich	4	2010	Runners-up
2.	China U-17	2	2010	Runners-up
2.	(England) Liverpool	2	2010	Runners-up
2.	(England) Manchester United	1	2012	Runners-up
2.	(Serbia) Partizan	1	2024	Runners-up
3.	(France) Paris Saint-German	5	2017	Third place
3.	(Spain) Barcelona	4	2010	Third place
3.	(Portugal) Benfica	4	2013	Third place
3.	(Italy) Milan	3	2010	Third place
3.	(Japan) J. League U-17	2	2017	Third place
3.	(Portugal) Porto	1	2015	Third place
4.	(Portugal) Sporting CP	2	2018	Fourth place
4.	(Brazil) Fluminense	1	2011	Fourth place
4.	(Brazil) São Paulo	1	2013	Fourth place
4.	(Spain) Atlético Madrid	1	2019	Fourth place
5.	(Scotland) Celtic	3	2011	Fifth place
5.	(South Africa) Ajax Cape Town	2	2011	Fifth place
5.	(Brazil) Desportivo Brasil	1	2012	Fifth place
5.	(Australia) Sydney FC	1	2018	Fifth place
5.	(Argentina) Boca Juniors	1	2019	Fifth place
5.	(Germany) Borussia Mönchengladbach	1	2023	Fifth place
6.	(England) Tottenham Hotspur	2	2013	Sixth place
6.	(United States) D.C. United	1	2011	Sixth place
6.	(Canada) Toronto FC	1	2013	Sixth place
6.	(Turkey) Galatasaray	1	2015	Sixth place
6.	(Ghana) Right to Dream	1	2016	Sixth place
6.	(England) Manchester City	1	2024	Sixth place
7.	(Turkey) Beşiktaş JK	1	2012	Seventh place
7.	(Brazil) Corinthians	1	2014	Seventh place
7.	(Germany) Schalke 04	1	2015	Seventh place
7.	(Austria) Red Bull Salzburg	1	2016	Seventh place
7.	(Spain) Sevilla FC	1	2018	Seventh place
7.	(Japan) Sagan Tosu	1	2019	Seventh place
7.	(England) Chelsea	1	2023	Seventh place
8.	(Mexico) Pachuca	2	2023	Eighth place
8.	(United States) FC Dallas	1	2010	Eighth place
8.	(Turkey) Fenerbahçe	1	2014	Eighth place
8.	(Greece) Olympiacos	1	2016	Eighth place

=== All-time cup winners ===
Cups	Club	In:
6	(Netherlands) Ajax	2010, 2012, 2014, 2017, 2018, 2024, 2025
3	(Belgium) Anderlecht	2011, 2013, 2015, 2026
1	(Denmark) Nordsjælland	2023
1	(Italy) Juventus	2019
1	(England) Arsenal	2016

=== All-time top-scorers ===
Statistics accurate as of AEGON Future Cup 2024.

Nr.	Player	Nationality	Goals	Club
1.	Naci Ünüvar	Turkey	7	Ajax
2.	Dominik Goßner	Germany	6	Bayern Munich
3.	Winsley Boteli	Switzerland	4	Borussia Mönchengladbach
3.	Anouar Ait El Hadj	Belgium	4	Anderlecht
3.	Nicholas Pasifakis	South Africa	4	Ajax Cape Town
3.	Patrick Foss	United States	4	D.C. United
3.	Oluwaseyi Ojo	England	4	Liverpool
3.	Harry Wilson	Wales	4	Liverpool
9.	Václav Černý	Czech Republic	3	Ajax
9.	Aaron Leya Iseka	Belgium	3	Anderlecht
9.	Elton Acolatse	Netherlands	3	Ajax
9.	Ademir Candido	Brazil	3	Desportivo Brasil
9.	Marco Pinato	Italy	3	Milan
9.	Alperen Doğan	Turkey	3	Beşiktaş JK
9.	Rafael Camacho	Portugal	3	Sporting CP
9.	Oumar Camara	France	3	Paris Saint-German
9.	Jinairo Johnson	Netherlands	3	Ajax
9.	Divine Mukasa	England	3	Manchester City
9.	Lazar Radosavljević	Serbia	3	Partizan

=== Participation by country ===
The under-17 youth teams of the following clubs have participated in the Future Cup tournament in the past.

- Argentina
  - (Argentina) Boca Juniors
    - 2019
- Australia
  - (Australia) Sydney FC
    - 2018
- Austria
  - (Austria) Red Bull Salzburg
    - 2016
- Belgium
  - (Belgium) Anderlecht
    - 2010, 2011, 2012, 2013, 2014, 2015, 2016, 2017, 2018, 2019, 2023, 2024
- Brazil
  - (Brazil) Corinthians
    - 2014
  - (Brazil) Desportivo Brasil
    - 2012
  - (Brazil) Fluminense
    - 2011
  - (Brazil) São Paulo
    - 2013
- Canada
  - (Canada) Toronto FC
    - 2013
- China
  - China U-17
    - 2010, 2011
- Denmark
  - (Denmark) Nordsjælland
    - 2023, 2024
- England
  - (England) Arsenal
    - 2016, 2017
  - (England) Chelsea
    - 2023
  - (England) Liverpool
    - 2010, 2014
  - (England) Manchester City
    - 2024
  - (England) Manchester United
    - 2012
  - (England) Tottenham Hotspur
    - 2013, 2019

- France
  - (France) Paris Saint-Germain
    - 2017, 2018, 2019, 2023, 2024
- Germany
  - (Germany) Bayern Munich
    - 2010, 2013, 2017, 2018
  - (Germany) Borussia Mönchengladbach
    - 2023
  - (Germany) Schalke 04
    - 2015
- Ghana
  - (Ghana) Right to Dream
    - 2016
- Greece
  - (Greece) Olympiacos
    - 2016
- Italy
  - (Italy) Juventus
    - 2015, 2017, 2018, 2019, 2023
  - (Italy) Milan
    - 2010, 2012, 2014
- Japan
  - (Japan) J. League U-17
    - 2017, 2018
  - (Japan) Sagan Tosu
    - 2019
- Mexico
  - (Mexico) Pachuca
    - 2023, 2024
- Netherlands
  - (Netherlands) Ajax
    - 2010, 2011, 2012, 2013, 2014, 2015, 2016, 2017, 2018, 2019, 2023, 2024
- Portugal
  - (Portugal) Benfica
    - 2013, 2016, 2017, 2019
  - (Portugal) Porto
    - 2015
  - (Portugal) Sporting CP
    - 2018, 2024
- Scotland
  - (Scotland) Celtic
    - 2011, 2014, 2015

- Serbia
  - (Serbia) Partizan
    - 2024
- South Africa
  - (South Africa) Ajax Cape Town
    - 2011, 2012
- Spain
  - (Spain) Atlético Madrid
    - 2019
  - (Spain) Barcelona
    - 2010, 2012, 2015, 2016
  - (Spain) Sevilla FC
    - 2018
- Turkey
  - (Turkey) Beşiktaş JK
    - 2012
  - (Turkey) Fenerbahçe
    - 2014
  - (Turkey) Galatasaray
    - 2015
- United States
  - (United States) D.C. United
    - 2011
  - (United States) FC Dallas
    - 2010

== See also ==
- Amsterdam Tournament
- Copa Amsterdam
