= Damián van der Vaart =

Dutch footballer (born 2006)

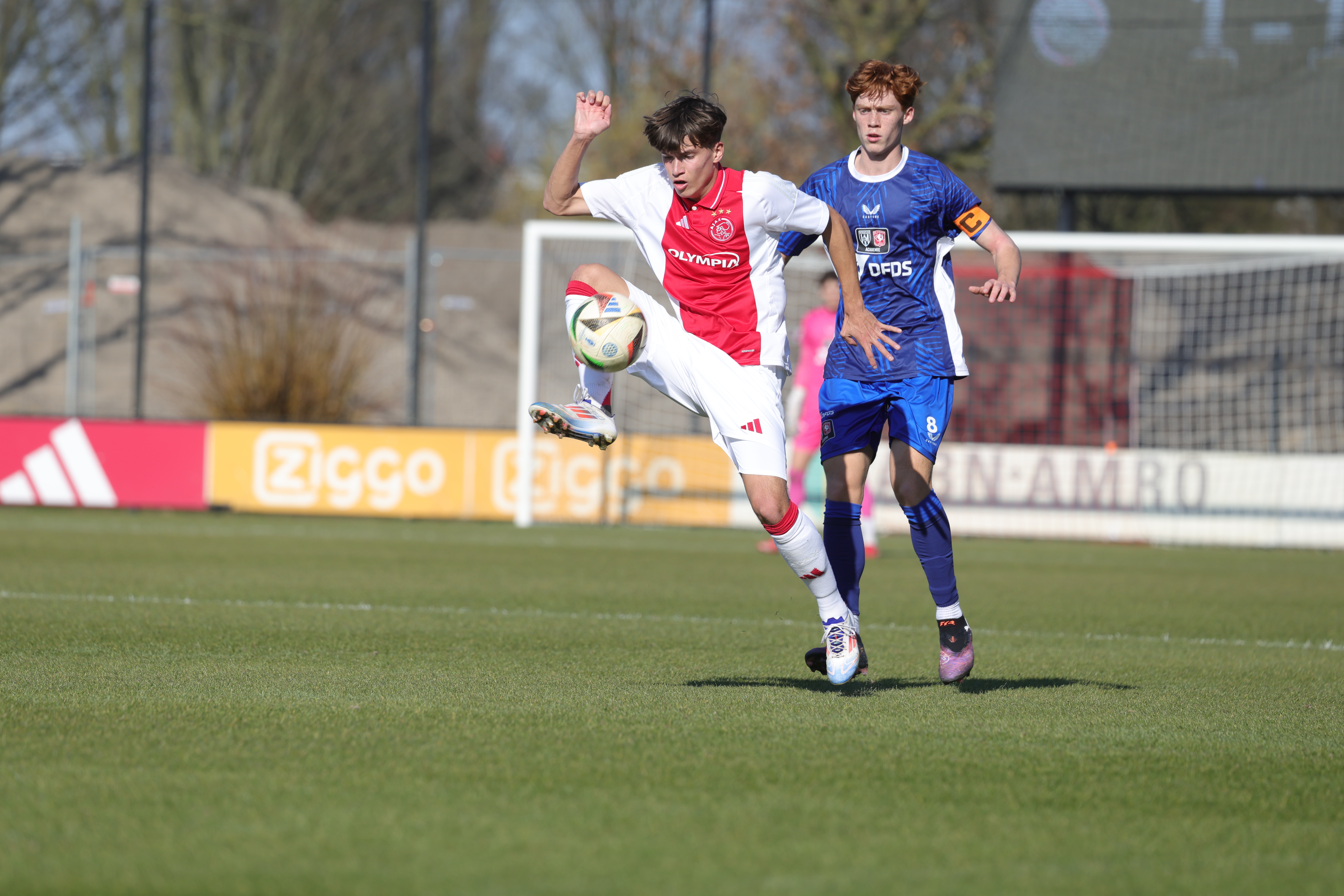

Personal information
- Date of birth: 28 May 2006 (age 20)
- Place of birth: Zaanstad, Netherlands
- Position: Winger

Team information
- Current team: Ajax
- Number: 64

Youth career
- 2012–2020: SC Victoria
- 2020–2023: Esbjerg
- 2023–2025: Ajax

Senior career*
Years	Team	Apps	(Gls)
2025–	Jong Ajax	22	(0)
- * Club domestic league appearances and goals as of 28 April 2026

Damián van der Vaart (born 28 May 2006) is a Dutch footballer who plays as a winger for Eerste Divisie team Jong Ajax.

== Early life ==
Van der Vaart was born in the Dutch municipality of Zaanstad to former Dutch international footballer Rafael van der Vaart and Dutch television personality and model Sylvie Meis. He is of Dutch and Spanish descent through his father, and Dutch, Indonesian and Belgian descent through his mother. Following his parents' separation in 2013, he remained in Germany with his mother.

== Club career ==
Following his father's move from London-based club Tottenham Hotspur to German side Hamburger SV in 2012, van der Vaart joined the academy of fellow Hamburg-based club SC Victoria. During his time with SC Victoria, the club was sponsored by his mother's company, Meis Enterprise.

In July 2020, van der Vaart moved to Denmark to live with his father, joining the academy of Esbjerg - the last club his father had played for, and the club his father's new partner, Estavana Polman, played handball for. A year after joining the Danish 1st Division side, on his fifteenth birthday in May 2021, he signed a new contract, keeping him with the club until 2023. He made his unofficial debut for the club in February 2022, while his father was a member of the coaching staff.

On 6 September 2023, van der Vaart joined another of his father's former clubs, returning to the Netherlands to join Ajax on a free transfer, with a compensation fee being agreed between Ajax and Esbjerg. He had trialled with the Eredivisie side three months prior, and on signing a one-year deal, he stated: "I am very happy. It was always a dream of mine to play for Ajax." On 7 January 2025, Van der vaart extended his contract with Ajax until 2029 with a plan to integrate him to Ajax's U23s. On 8 August 2025, he made his professional debut with Jong Ajax as a substitute in a 2–0 Eerste Divisie loss to FC Den Bosch.

== International career ==
Born in the Netherlands, Van der Vaart is eligible to represent the Netherlands and Indonesia at international level, due to his mother's Dutch East Indies heritage. He made his debut for the Netherlands under-17 Futures side, composed of players not yet eligible to represent the full under-17 squad, in a 2–2 friendly draw against Luxembourg in February 2023, before going on to also feature in a 2–0 loss to Belgium.
