= Ryan van de Pavert =

Dutch footballer (born 2006)

Personal information
- Date of birth: 24 January 2006 (age 20)
- Place of birth: Amsterdam, Netherlands
- Height: 1.84 m (6 ft 0 in)
- Position: Right-back

Team information
- Current team: Jong Ajax
- Number: 2

Youth career
- 2017–2024: AFC Ajax

Senior career*
Years	Team	Apps	(Gls)
2024–	Jong Ajax	25	(0)
2026	→ Cambuur (loan)	1	(0)
- * Club domestic league appearances and goals as of 4 October 2026

Ryan van de Pavert (born 24 January 2006) is a Dutch professional footballer who plays as a right-back for Eerste Divisie club Jong Ajax. Born in the Netherlands, he is of Indonesian descent.

== Personal life ==
Van de Pavert is of Indonesian descent through both of his parents. His paternal grandparents originate from Medan and Surabaya, while his mother is also of partial Indonesian heritage.

== Club career ==
Born in Amsterdam, van de Pavert joined the youth academy of AFC Ajax in 2017. He advanced through the club's youth ranks and made his professional debut for the reserve squad, Jong Ajax, on 22 November 2024 in a 3–0 Eerste Divisie victory against Telstar. Following his early integration into the reserve team, he signed his first professional contract with Ajax on 17 February 2025, binding him to the club until 30 June 2029.

In mid-2026, van de Pavert was sent on loan to Cambuur. He registered one senior league appearance during his temporary stint with Cambuur at the beginning of the 2026–27 season. However, on 26 August 2026, Ajax and SC Cambuur mutually agreed to terminate the loan agreement early due to personal circumstances, prompting van de Pavert's immediate return to Amsterdam to rejoin the Jong Ajax squad.
