= Naci Ünüvar =

Turkish footballer (born 2003)

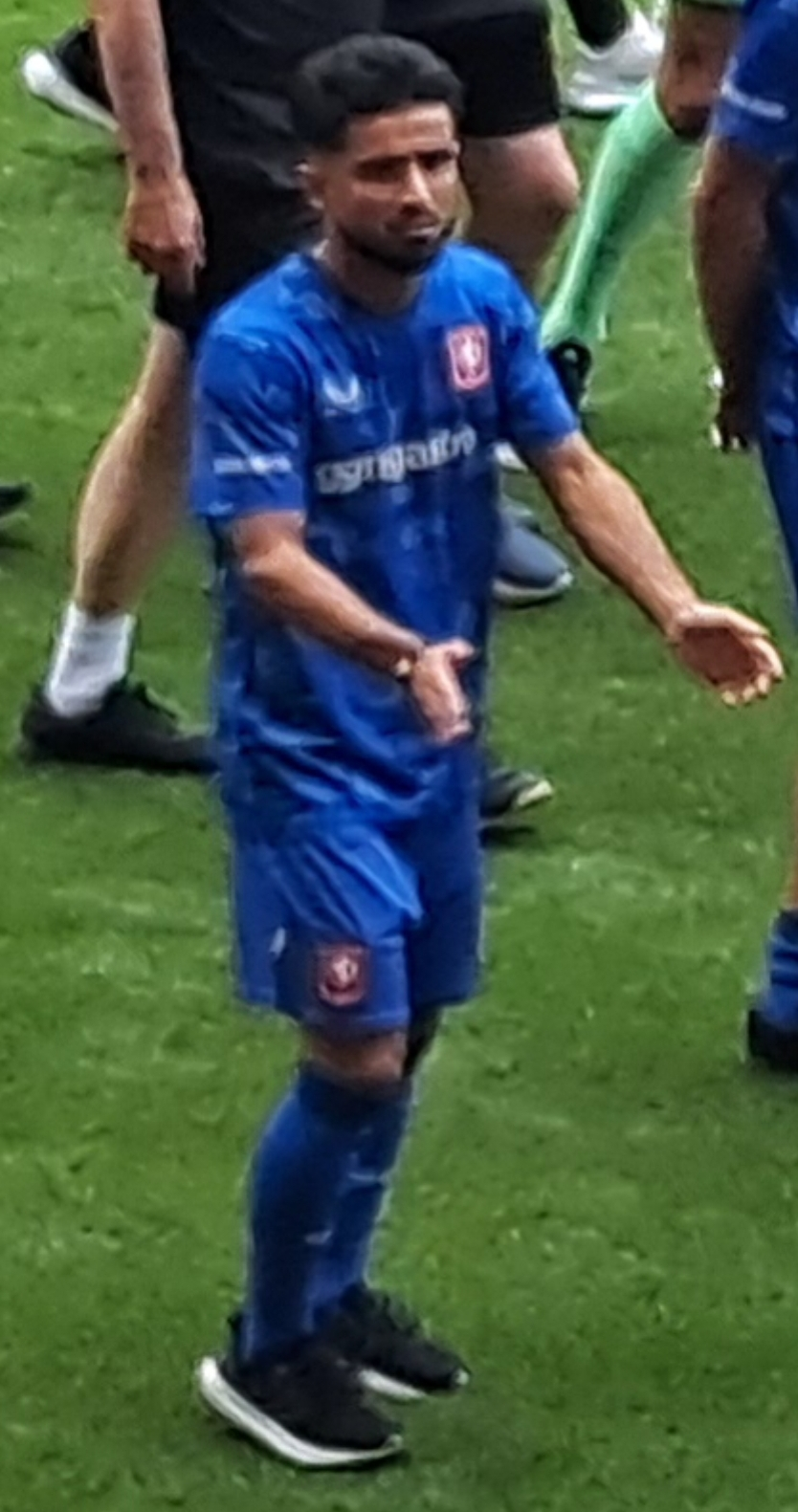
- Ünüvar 2025

Personal information
- Full name: Naci Ünüvar
- Date of birth: 13 June 2003 (age 23)
- Place of birth: Zaandam, Netherlands
- Height: 1.68 m (5 ft 6 in)
- Positions: Winger; attacking midfielder

Team information
- Current team: Twente
- Number: 37

Youth career
- –2011: OFC
- 2011–2020: Ajax

Senior career*
| Years | Team | Apps | (Gls) |
| 2019–2025 | Jong Ajax | 73 | (24) |
| 2020–2025 | Ajax | 3 | (1) |
| 2022–2023 | → Trabzonspor (loan) | 8 | (1) |
| 2023–2024 | → Twente (loan) | 19 | (3) |
| 2024–2025 | → Espanyol (loan) | 2 | (0) |
| 2025– | Twente | 19 | (2) |
| 2026 | → Heracles Almelo (loan) | 10 | (0) |

International career^{‡}
| 2017–2018 | Netherlands U15 | 6 | (0) |
| 2018 | Netherlands U16 | 2 | (0) |
| 2019 | Netherlands U17 | 17 | (5) |
| 2019 | Netherlands U18 | 3 | (2) |
| 2021 | Netherlands U19 | 5 | (2) |
| 2023 | Turkey U21 | 1 | (0) |
Medal record
Representing Netherlands
UEFA European Under-17 Championship
| Winner | 2019 | U-17 Team |
- * Club domestic league appearances and goals as of 20 September 2026 ‡ National team caps and goals as of 27 March 2023

Naci Ünüvar (born 13 June 2003) is a professional footballer who plays as a winger or attacking midfielder for Eredivisie club Twente. Born in the Netherlands, he represents Turkey at youth international level. He was included in The Guardian's "Next Generation 2020".

== Early life and youth career ==
Ünüvar was born in Zaandam, North Holland, and is of Turkish descent. He began playing football locally with OFC Oostzaan before joining the Ajax Youth Academy in 2011 at age eight. Widely regarded as one of the most promising talents of his age cohort at Ajax, he progressed through the youth ranks ahead of his age bracket. In April 2018, aged 14, he was named Player of the Tournament at the annual ABN AMRO Future Cup after leading the Ajax Under-17 team to the trophy. At the conclusion of the 2018–19 season, he received the Abdelhak Nouri Trophy, awarded annually to the most outstanding talent in the Ajax academy.

== Club career ==
=== Ajax ===
Ünüvar made his senior professional debut for reserve team Jong Ajax in the Eerste Divisie on 13 December 2019 during a 3–2 away defeat to SC Cambuur.

On 22 January 2020, Ünüvar made his competitive first-team debut for Ajax in a 2019–20 KNVB Cup fixture against SV Spakenburg, entering as a late substitute and converting a penalty in a 7–0 victory. At 16 years and 223 days, he became the youngest player to score on his official debut for Ajax.

Despite his early goalscoring debut, Ünüvar experienced a period of slow development in subsequent months, later reflecting that coping with rapid media attention and adapting to senior physical standards posed significant challenges. In subsequent seasons, he expressed frustration over limited first-team opportunities under successive managers, despite maintaining consistent production for Jong Ajax. Across four seasons with Jong Ajax, he made 73 Eerste Divisie appearances, recording 24 goals and 18 assists, highlighted by a 16-goal campaign during the 2021–22 season.

==== Loans to Trabzonspor, Twente, and Espanyol ====
On 30 August 2022, Ünüvar was loaned to Süper Lig club Trabzonspor for the 2022–23 campaign. He registered three goals in 12 appearances across all competitions.

For the 2023–24 season, Ünüvar returned to the Netherlands on loan with FC Twente. He featured primarily as an impact substitute, showing flashes of creative play and contributing four goals in 25 matches across all competitions as Twente secured third place in the Eredivisie.

On 29 August 2024, Ünüvar joined La Liga side RCD Espanyol on loan for the 2024–25 season. He made four competitive appearances during his spell in Spain.

=== FC Twente ===
On 16 January 2025, Ajax and Ünüvar mutually agreed to terminate his contract early. Concurrently, he finalized a permanent three-and-a-half-year contract with FC Twente.

==== Loan to Heracles Almelo ====
On 27 January 2026, seeking greater match minutes, Ünüvar moved to Twente's regional rival Heracles Almelo on loan for the remainder of the 2025–26 season. The intra-regional move drew commentary in Dutch media due to the traditional rivalry between the two Overijssel clubs. Upon signing, Heracles technical management highlighted his 1v1 capability and attacking creativity as key reasons for his acquisition.

== International career ==
Ünüvar represented the Netherlands at youth international level from under-15 to under-19. He was part of the squad that won the 2019 UEFA European Under-17 Championship, scoring a goal in the 4–2 victory over Italy in the final.

In 2023, Ünüvar elected to switch his international allegiance to Turkey. He made his debut for the Turkey U21 team on 27 March 2023.

== Style of play ==
Operating primarily as a left winger or an attacking midfielder, Ünüvar is noted for his technical execution, ball control, and 1v1 dribbling. Raised within the positional training methods of Ajax's youth academy, he frequently cuts inside from the left flank onto his stronger right foot to create shooting opportunities or make decisive passes into the penalty area.

== Personal life ==
His younger brother, Emre Ünüvar, is also a professional footballer who progressed through the Ajax Youth Academy. Naci has publicly provided guidance and advice to his brother regarding managing expectations and navigating elite youth football.

== Career statistics ==
As of 6 August 2026

Appearances and goals by club, season and competition
| Club | Season | League | | | National Cup (Note: Includes KNVB Cup and Turkish Cup) | | Europe | | Other | | Total | |
| Club | Season | Division | Apps | Goals | Apps | Goals | Apps | Goals | Apps | Goals | Apps | Goals |
|---|---|---|---|---|---|---|---|---|---|---|---|---|
| Jong Ajax | 2019–20 | Eerste Divisie | 10 | 1 | – | | – | | – | | 10 | 1 |
| Jong Ajax | 2020–21 | Eerste Divisie | 29 | 7 | – | | – | | – | | 29 | 7 |
| Jong Ajax | 2021–22 | Eerste Divisie | 33 | 16 | – | | – | | – | | 33 | 16 |
| Jong Ajax | 2022–23 | Eerste Divisie | 1 | 0 | – | | – | | – | | 1 | 0 |
| Jong Ajax | Total | | 73 | 24 | – | | – | | – | | 73 | 24 |
| Ajax | 2019–20 | Eredivisie | 0 | 0 | 1 | 1 | 0 | 0 | 0 | 0 | 1 | 1 |
| Ajax | 2021–22 | Eredivisie | 0 | 0 | 2 | 0 | 0 | 0 | 0 | 0 | 2 | 0 |
| Ajax | Total | | 0 | 0 | 3 | 1 | 0 | 0 | 0 | 0 | 3 | 1 |
| Trabzonspor (loan) | 2022–23 | Süper Lig | 8 | 1 | 2 | 2 | 2 (Note: Appearances in UEFA Europa League) | 0 | – | | 12 | 3 |
| FC Twente (loan) | 2023–24 | Eredivisie | 19 | 3 | 0 | 0 | 6 (Note: Appearances in UEFA Conference League) | 1 | – | | 25 | 4 |
| Espanyol (loan) | 2024–25 | La Liga | 2 | 0 | 2 | 0 | 0 | 0 | – | | 4 | 0 |
| FC Twente | 2024–25 | Eredivisie | 11 | 0 | – | | 2 | 0 | – | | 13 | 0 |
| FC Twente | 2025–26 | Eredivisie | 8 | 2 | 1 | 0 | — | | — | | 9 | 2 |
| FC Twente | 2026–27 | Eredivisie | 0 | 0 | 0 | 0 | 1 (Note: Appearance in UEFA Conference League) | 0 | — | | 1 | 0 |
| FC Twente | Total | | 19 | 2 | 1 | 0 | 3 | 0 | — | | 23 | 2 |
| Heracles Almelo (loan) | 2025–26 | Eredivisie | 10 | 0 | 0 | 0 | — | | — | | 10 | 0 |
| Career total | | | 131 | 30 | 8 | 3 | 11 | 1 | 0 | 0 | 150 | 34 |

== Honours ==
Netherlands U17

- UEFA European Under-17 Championship: 2019

Individual

- ABN AMRO Future Cup Best Player: 2018
- Abdelhak Nouri Trophy: 2018–19
