= Joeri Heerkens =

Dutch footballer (born 2006)

Personal information
- Full name: Joeri Jesse Heerkens
- Date of birth: 8 May 2006 (age 20)
- Place of birth: Broumov, Czech Republic
- Height: 1.93 m (6 ft 4 in)
- Position: Goalkeeper

Team information
- Current team: Ajax
- Number: 22

Youth career
- –2018: TJ Slovan Broumov
- 2018–2019: Náchod
- 2019–2021: Hradec Králové
- 2021–2024: Sparta Prague

Senior career*
Years	Team	Apps	(Gls)
2024–2025	Sparta Prague	0	(0)
2024	→ Loko Prague (loan)	9	(0)
2024–2025	→ Sparta Prague B	15	(0)
2025–	Ajax	0	(0)
2025–	Jong Ajax	26	(0)

International career^{‡}
2021–2022	Czech Republic U16	2	(0)
2021–2022	Czech Republic U16	2	(0)
2022–2023	Czech Republic U17	9	(0)
2023	Czech Republic U18	2	(0)
2023–2024	Netherlands U18	3	(0)
2024–2025	Netherlands U19	12	(0)
Medal record
Men's football
Representing Netherlands
UEFA European Under-19 Championship
Winner	2025 Romania
- * Club domestic league appearances and goals as of 3 October 2026 ‡ National team caps and goals as of 26 June 2025

Joeri Jesse Heerkens (born 8 May 2006) is a footballer who plays as a goalkeeper for Eredivisie club Ajax. Born in the Czech Republic, he is a Netherlands and Czech Republic youth international.

== Early life ==
Heerkens was born on 8 May 2006 in Broumov, Czech Republic to Dutch parents. Born to Hillebrand and Natasja Heerkens, he started playing football at the age of six. At the age of thirteen, he started attending sports boarding school in the Czech Republic.

== Club career ==
As a youth player, Heerkens joined the youth academy of Czech side TJ Slovan Broumov. In 2018, he joined the youth academy of Czech side FK Náchod. One year later, he joined the youth academy of Czech side FC Hradec Králové at the age of twelve.

Subsequently, he joined the youth academy of Czech side AC Sparta Prague in 2021. Three years later, he was sent on loan to Czech side FK Loko Prague, where he made nine league appearances. Following his stint there, he was promoted to Sparta's reserve team.

On 28 July 2025, Heerkens signed a contract with AFC Ajax until 2030.

== International career ==
Heerkens is a Dutch and Czech Republic youth international. During March 2023, he played for the Czech Republic national under-17 football team for 2023 UEFA European Under-17 Championship qualification. In March 2025 played for the Netherlands national under-19 football team for 2025 UEFA European Under-19 Championship qualification

== Career statistics ==
As of match played 3 October 2026

Appearances and goals by club, season and competition
Club	Season	League			National cup		Europe		Other		Total	
Club	Season	Division	Apps	Goals	Apps	Goals	Apps	Goals	Apps	Goals	Apps	Goals
Sparta Prague	2023–24	Czech First League	0	0	0	0	0	0	0	0	0	0
Sparta Prague	2024–25	Czech First League	0	0	0	0	0	0	0	0	0	0
Sparta Prague	Total		0	0	0	0	0	0	0	0	0	0
Loko Prague (loan)	2023–24	Czech First League	9	0	—		—		—		9	0
Sparta Prague B (loan)	2024–25	Czech National Football League	15	0	—		—		—		15	0
Ajax	2025–26	Eredivisie	0	0	0	0	0	0	—		0	0
Ajax	2025–26	Eerste Divisie	18	0	0	0	0	0	—		18	0
Ajax	2026–27	Eerste Divisie	8	0	0	0	0	0	—		8	0
Career total			50	0	0	0	0	0	0	0	50	0

== Honours ==
Netherlands U19

- UEFA European Under-19 Championship: 2025

Individual

- UEFA European Under-19 Championship Team of the Tournament: 2025
