= Willem Weijs =

Dutch football manager

Personal information
- Date of birth: 19 February 1987 (age 39)
- Place of birth: Broekhuizenvorst, Netherlands

Managerial career
- Years: Team
- 2020: NAC Breda (caretaker)
- 2023–2024: FC Eindhoven
- 2025–2026: Jong Ajax

Willem Weijs (born 19 February 1987) is a Dutch football manager. He has managed NAC Breda (caretaker), FC Eindhoven and Jong Ajax in the Eerste Divisie, and was assistant manager at Anderlecht and Lommel of the Belgian Pro League.

== Career ==
Weijs was born in Broekhuizenvorst in the province of Limburg. He began coaching in 2007 for the youth team at PSV Eindhoven, going on to the same role at Ajax (2013–2017) and NAC Breda (2017–2019).

In 2019, Weijs was promoted to first-team assistant manager at NAC, supporting Ruud Brood. At the turn of the year, the 32-year-old was appointed caretaker manager of the Eerste Divisie club. His debut on 10 January was a goalless draw away to Helmond Sport; he recorded two draws and a win in his four league games, as well as a 2–0 home win over PSV in the last 16 of the KNVB Cup on 23 January.

Weijs was appointed on a two-year contract at Willem II Tilburg's under-21 team in May 2020. In September 2021, he moved abroad for the first time in his career, replacing Aaron Danks and Craig Bellamy as Vincent Kompany's assistant with Anderlecht in the Belgian Pro League. The following June, after Kompany left for Burnley, Weijs stayed in Belgium and became Steve Bould's assistant at Lommel.

In July 2023, Weijs returned to his country's second division, signing a two-year deal at FC Eindhoven. Having finished 14th in his only season he returned to Ajax to lead the under-19 team, being promoted to manage reserve team Jong Ajax in the second tier in June 2025. He was dismissed on 10 February 2026 by incoming technical director Jordi Cruyff. After his dismissal, Weijs said that he had arrived at a Jong Ajax side without enough players, and had to recall his under-19 players from holiday to represent the team.
