= Marvyn Muzungu =

French association football player (born 2007)

Personal information
- Date of birth: 28 November 2007 (age 18)
- Place of birth: Montpellier, France
- Height: 1.92 m (6 ft 4 in)
- Position: Defender

Team information
- Current team: Jong Ajax
- Number: 35

Youth career
- 2013–2015: Beauvoisin
- 2015-2019: Libourne
- 2019–2023: Nîmes
- 2023-2025: Auxerre

Senior career*
Years	Team	Apps	(Gls)
2025–	Jong Ajax	36	(0)
2024–	Ajax	0	(0)

International career^{‡}
2024–2025	France U18		
2026	France U19		
- * Club domestic league appearances and goals as of 28 August 2026 ‡ National team caps and goals as of 00:33, 3 October 2026 (UTC)

Marvyn Muzungu (born 28 November 2007) is a French professional footballer who plays as a centre-back for Jong Ajax of the Eerste Divisie. He has represented France at youth level.

== Club career ==
A left-footed centre-back born in Montpellier, Muzungu came through the youth system at Beauvoisin from 2013 to 2015, before he moved to Libourne until 2019. From 2019, he was then in the youth academy of Nîmes and from 2023, Auxerre. Standing at 1.92m by the age of 17 years-old, Muzungu was included in two Auxerre first-team squads during the 2024-25 season, against Nice and Lyon, without making his senior debut, but did start for the club in the UEFA Youth League.

In June 2025, with his contract with Auxerre expired, he had trials at Ajax, signing with the club the following month, agreeing a three-year contract; he was subsequently moved into the Jong Ajax squad. His made his debut in the Eerste Divisie for Jong Ajax on 19 September 2025 in a 1-0 away defeat against Willem II.

== International career ==
Muzungu earned caps with the France U18 team in the 2024-25 season, featuring against United States, Australia, Argentina and Japan, among others. The following season, he played for France U19 in qualifying matches for the 2026 UEFA European Under-19 Championship.
