= Mylo van der Lans =

Dutch footballer (born 2007)

Personal information
- Full name: Mylo van der Lans
- Date of birth: 11 April 2007 (age 19)
- Place of birth: Delft, Netherlands
- Height: 1.81 m (5 ft 11 in)
- Position: Centre-back

Team information
- Current team: Jong Ajax
- Number: 53

Youth career
- –2019: RKVV Westlandia
- 2019–: Ajax

Senior career*
| Years | Team | Apps | (Gls) |
| 2025– | Jong Ajax | 23 | (0) |

International career^{‡}
| 2022–2023 | Netherlands U16 | 7 | (0) |
| 2023–2024 | Netherlands U17 | 10 | (0) |
| 2024 | Netherlands U18 | 6 | (0) |
| 2025– | Netherlands U19 | 6 | (0) |
- * Club domestic league appearances and goals as of 4 April 2026 ‡ National team caps and goals as of 31 March 2026

Mylo van der Lans (born 11 April 2007) is a Dutch professional footballer who plays as a Centre-back for Eerste Divisie club Jong Ajax.

== Early life ==
Van der Lans was born in Delft and grew up in 's-Gravenzande in the Westland municipality, where his parents ran a tomato farming business. He began his youth football career at local amateur club RKVV Westlandia before moving to the Ajax youth academy in the summer of 2019.

== Club career ==
Van der Lans progressed through the Ajax youth ranks and captained the under-19 squad. In August 2024, he signed his first professional contract with Ajax, tying him to the club until mid-2027. On 17 April 2025, he signed a contract extension, committing to the club until 30 June 2030.

Ahead of the 2025–26 season, he was promoted to Jong Ajax, the club's reserve team playing in the professional Eerste Divisie, and was named the squad's captain. He made his professional debut on 15 September 2025 in a 3–1 home defeat against ADO Den Haag.

In late 2025, Van der Lans was called up to the Ajax first-team matchday squad, appearing as an unused substitute in both the Eredivisie and the group stages of the UEFA Champions League.

== International career ==
Van der Lans is a youth international for the Netherlands. He has represented his country across various age groups, accumulating caps for the under-16, under-17, under-18, and under-19 national teams.

== Career statistics ==
As of match played 3 April 2026

Appearances and goals by club, season and competition
| Club | Season | League | | | National cup | | Europe | | Other | | Total | |
| Club | Season | Division | Apps | Goals | Apps | Goals | Apps | Goals | Apps | Goals | Apps | Goals |
|---|---|---|---|---|---|---|---|---|---|---|---|---|
| Jong Ajax | 2025–26 | Eerste Divisie | 23 | 0 | — | | — | | — | | 23 | 0 |
| Jong Ajax | Total | | 23 | 0 | — | | — | | — | | 23 | 0 |
| Career total | | | 23 | 0 | — | | — | | — | | 23 | 0 |
