= Avery Appiah =

Dutch footballer

Personal information
- Full name: Avery Appiah
- Date of birth: 2 April 2006 (age 20)
- Place of birth: Zoetermeer, Netherlands
- Height: 1.74 m (5 ft 9 in)
- Positions: Right-back; defensive midfielder

Team information
- Current team: Jong Ajax
- Number: 2

Youth career
- –2015: KRSV Vredenburch
- –2015: Sparta Rotterdam
- 2015–2020: Feyenoord
- 2020–2025: Ajax

Senior career*
| Years | Team | Apps | (Gls) |
| 2023– | Jong Ajax | 38 | (0) |

International career^{‡}
| 2021–2022 | Netherlands U16 | 6 | (0) |
| 2022–2023 | Netherlands U17 | 7 | (1) |
- * Club domestic league appearances and goals as of 24 April 2026 ‡ National team caps and goals as of 1 June 2023

Avery Appiah (born 2 April 2006) is a Dutch professional footballer who plays as a right-back or defensive midfielder for Eerste Divisie club Jong Ajax, where he has served as team captain.

== Early life and youth career ==
Appiah was born in Zoetermeer, South Holland. He began his grassroots youth football with local amateur club KRSV Vredenburch in Rijswijk and the youth section of Sparta Rotterdam before transferring to the Feyenoord youth academy in 2015. In 2020, at fourteen years of age, he joined the Ajax Youth Academy ('De Toekomst').

On 3 May 2023, Appiah signed his first professional contract with Ajax, committing to a two-year agreement through June 2025.

== Club career ==
=== Jong Ajax ===
Appiah made his professional debut in the Eerste Divisie for reserve side Jong Ajax on 27 October 2023, entering as a late substitute for Diyae Jermoumi in a 2–1 away loss against Roda JC Kerkrade. He made his first senior start on 28 April 2024, playing the full 90 minutes in a 1–0 home victory over Helmond Sport.

During the 2024–25 and 2025–26 Eerste Divisie campaigns, Appiah established himself as a regular starter at right-back and key defensive presence for Jong Ajax, eventually inheriting the captain's armband. Recognizing his tactical development, Ajax announced on 27 June 2025 that Appiah had signed a three-year contract extension, committing to the club until 30 June 2028.

In April 2026, Appiah drew attention in Dutch sports press after delivering an assist during a 1–0 away victory over Jong PSV. Interviewed by ESPN after the fixture as team captain, he remarked that when playing at full capability, Jong Ajax was "one of the best teams in the Keuken Kampioen Divisie." The statement prompted media commentary, including an analysis by Het Parool columnist Menno Pot on team performance and academy dynamics.

== International career ==
Appiah has earned youth international caps for the Netherlands across multiple age groups. Between 2021 and 2022, he logged six appearances for the Netherlands under-16 national team.

In 2022, he progressed to the Netherlands U17 squad, scoring his first international goal on 21 September 2022 during a 1–1 draw against the Republic of Ireland U17. Appiah was subsequently named to the final Dutch squad for the 2023 UEFA European Under-17 Championship in Hungary.

== Style of play ==
Primarily deployed as an inverted right-back or defensive midfielder, Appiah is noted for his tactical discipline, tackling efficiency, and ability to break lines in buildup play. Ajax Director of Football Marijn Beuker highlighted his leadership characteristics, operational work rate, and positional flexibility within Ajax's tactical framework.

== Career statistics ==
=== Club ===
As of match played 24 April 2026

| Club | Season | League | | | KNVB Cup | | Europe | | Other | | Total | |
| Club | Season | Division | Apps | Goals | Apps | Goals | Apps | Goals | Apps | Goals | Apps | Goals |
|---|---|---|---|---|---|---|---|---|---|---|---|---|
| Jong Ajax | 2023–24 | Eerste Divisie | 2 | 0 | — | | — | | — | | 2 | 0 |
| Jong Ajax | 2024–25 | Eerste Divisie | 3 | 0 | — | | — | | — | | 3 | 0 |
| Jong Ajax | 2025–26 | Eerste Divisie | 33 | 0 | — | | — | | — | | 33 | 0 |
| Career total | | | 38 | 0 | — | | — | | — | | 38 | 0 |
