= Marijn Beuker =

Dutch football executive

Personal information
- Date of birth: 21 September 1984 (age 42)
- Place of birth: Arnhem, Netherlands

Managerial career
- Years: Team
- 2007–2013: AZ (youth coordinator)
- 2013–2021: AZ (head of development)
- 2021–2023: Queen's Park (sporting director)
- 2021–2022: Queen's Park (interim)
- 2023–2026: Ajax (director of football)

Marijn Beuker (born 21 September 1984) is a Dutch football executive and former interim manager. He most recently served as the Director of Football for Eredivisie club Ajax between December 2023 and July 2026.

== Early life and education ==
Beuker was born and raised in Arnhem. He attended the Liemers College but dropped out before completing his HAVO diploma. He subsequently completed a management course in the hospitality industry before studying sports management and commercial economics at the Johan Cruyff University in Amsterdam from 2005 to 2009. During his early development, Beuker made self-directed observational visits to study European clubs including AS Roma, RCD Espanyol, and OGC Nice.

== Executive career ==
=== AZ Alkmaar ===
In 2007, Beuker was appointed coordinator of talent development at AZ Alkmaar. In 2013, he was promoted to Director of Football Development and Strategy. Over his 15-year tenure with the club, he helped construct AZ's youth academy, implementing a scientific and data-driven approach to talent identification and athletic progression. During his time in Alkmaar, Beuker collaborated with several managers, including Louis van Gaal, Marco van Basten, Ronald Koeman, and Arne Slot.

=== Queen's Park ===
In November 2021, Beuker was appointed Director of Football Operations at Scottish Championship side Queen's Park. He was tasked with restructuring the club's academy to establish a sustainable youth-to-first-team pathway. During the 2021–22 season, he briefly served as the club's interim manager. He left the Scottish outfit in late 2023.

=== Ajax ===
On 29 November 2023, Beuker joined Ajax as Director of Football, officially starting on 1 December 2023 after signing a contract running until July 2028. Endorsed by supervisory board advisor Louis van Gaal and chief executive Alex Kroes, Beuker was appointed to oversee the long-term vision of the club, including the youth academy at De Toekomst, scouting, and data analytics departments. During his tenure, he advocated for the appointment of Francesco Farioli as head coach in the summer of 2024.

Following executive reshuffles, managerial changes, and the appointment of Jordi Cruyff as technical director in February 2026, Beuker's authority over technical policy diminished. On 29 June 2026, Ajax officially announced that Beuker would depart the club per 1 July 2026 by mutual consent following a fundamental difference of opinion regarding the club's technical direction.
