= Gerald Alders =

Dutch footballer (born 2005)

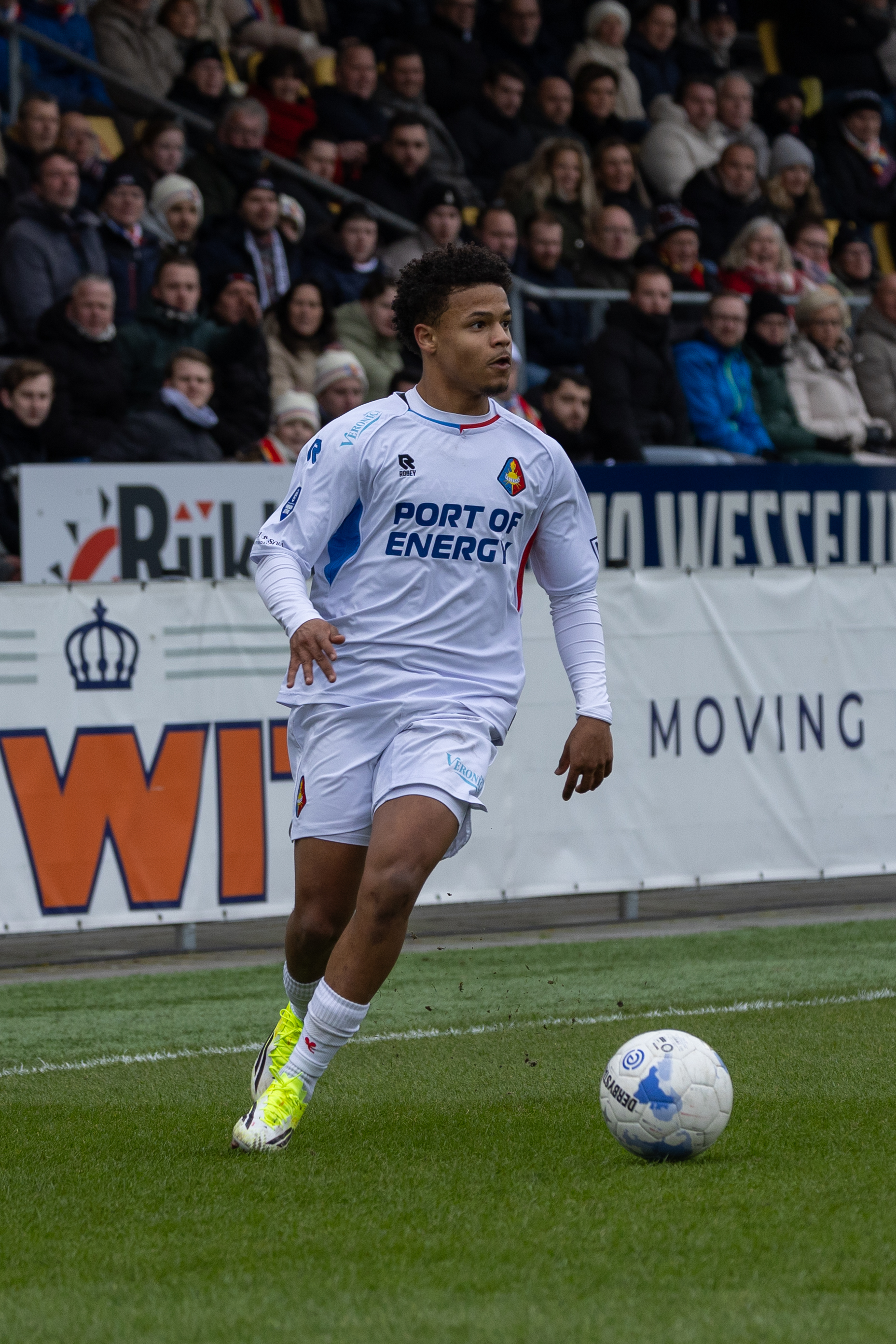

Personal information
- Date of birth: 7 May 2005 (age 21)
- Place of birth: Amsterdam, Netherlands
- Height: 1.79 m (5 ft 10 in)
- Position: Right-back

Team information
- Current team: Telstar (on loan from Ajax)
- Number: 3

Youth career
- 2013–2014: Sporting Martinus
- 2014–2023: Ajax

Senior career*
Years	Team	Apps	(Gls)
2023–	Jong Ajax	49	(0)
2025–	Ajax	3	(0)
2025	→ Twente (loan)	2	(0)
2026–	→ Telstar (loan)	12	(0)

International career
2023	Netherlands U18	1	(0)
2023	Netherlands U19	4	(0)
- * Club domestic league appearances and goals as of 15:49, 16 September 2026 (UTC)

Gerald Alders (born 7 May 2005) is a Dutch professional footballer who plays as a right-back for Eredivisie club Telstar, on loan from Ajax.

== Career ==
A youth product of Sporting Martinus, Alders joined the youth academy of Ajax in 2014. Working his way up their youth sides, he was promoted to Jong Ajax in the Eerste Divisie in 2023. On 28 July 2024, he signed his first professional contract with Ajax until 2026. In January 2025, he started training with the senior Ajax team. He first the match-day squad with Ajax in a UEFA Europa League match against FK RFS on 22 January 2025.

On 4 February 2025, Alders was loaned to Twente.

On 3 February 2026, Alders joined Eredivisie club Telstar on a six-month loan. On 25 June 2026, Telstar extended the loan for a further season, keeping him at the club until June 2027.

== International career ==
Alders was born in the Netherlands to a Dutch father and Namibian mother. In October 2023, he was called up to the Netherlands U19s for a set of friendlies.

== Career statistics ==
As of match played 13 September 2026

Appearances and goals by club, season and competition
Club	Season	League			Cup		Europe		Total	
Club	Season	Division	Apps	Goals	Apps	Goals	Apps	Goals	Apps	Goals
Jong Ajax	2023–24	Eerste Divisie	16	0	—		—		16	0
Jong Ajax	2024–25	Eerste Divisie	23	0	—		—		23	0
Jong Ajax	2025–26	Eerste Divisie	10	0	—		—		10	0
Jong Ajax	Total		49	0	—		—		49	0
Ajax	2024–25	Eredivisie	0	0	0	0	0	0	0	0
Ajax	2025–26	Eredivisie	3	0	1	0	1 (Note: Appearances in UEFA Champions League)	0	5	0
Ajax	Total		3	0	1	0	1	0	5	0
Twente (loan)	2024–25	Eredivisie	3	0	—		—		3	0
Telstar (loan)	2025–26	Eredivisie	7	0	2	0	—		9	0
Telstar (loan)	2026–27	Eredivisie	5	0	0	0	—		5	0
Telstar (loan)	Total		12	0	2	0	—		14	0
Career total			67	0	3	0	1	0	71	0
