= Emre Ünüvar =

Dutch footballer (born 2008)

Personal information
- Date of birth: 18 March 2008 (age 18)
- Place of birth: Zaandam, Netherlands
- Height: 1.71 m (5 ft 7 in)
- Position: Striker

Team information
- Current team: Jong Ajax
- Number: 59

Youth career
- 2015–2024: Ajax

Senior career*
| Years | Team | Apps | (Gls) |
| 2024– | Jong Ajax | 17 | (4) |

International career^{‡}
| 2023–2024 | Netherlands U16 | 8 | (4) |
| 2024– | Netherlands U17 | 3 | (2) |
- * Club domestic league appearances and goals as of 28 April 2026 ‡ National team caps and goals as of 02:55, 27 August 2024 (UTC)

Emre Ünüvar (born 18 March 2008) is a Dutch professional footballer who plays as a striker for the Eerste Divisie club Jong Ajax.

== Club career ==
Ünüvar joined the youth academy of Ajax in 2015, and worked his way up their youth categories. On 31 July 2023, he signed a contract that began on his 16th birthday and ran until 2026. He made his senior and professional debut with Jong Ajax as a substitute in a 4–1 Eerste Divisie loss to Jong AZ on 10 May 2024, and at 16 years old and 55 days became their youngest ever debutant. On 14 August 2024, he extended his contract until 2027.

== International career ==
Born in the Netherlands, Ünüvar is of Turkish descent. He is a youth international for the Netherlands, having played for the Netherlands U17s.

== Personal life ==
Emre is the brother of Naci Ünüvar, who is also a professional footballer.
