= Pharell Nash =

Dutch footballer (born 2008)

Personal information
- Date of birth: 7 February 2008 (age 18)
- Place of birth: Amsterdam, Netherlands
- Height: 1.78 m (5 ft 10 in)
- Position: Winger

Team information
- Current team: Ajax
- Number: 66

Youth career
- SV Ouderkerk
- 2015–2025: Ajax

Senior career*
Years	Team	Apps	(Gls)
2025–	Jong Ajax	19	(2)
2025–	Ajax	1	(0)

International career^{‡}
2023	Netherlands U15	3	(0)
2024–2025	Netherlands U17	8	(2)
2025–	Netherlands U18	6	(1)
- * Club domestic league appearances and goals as of 28 April 2026 ‡ National team caps and goals as of 23:12, 17 November 2025 (UTC)

Pharell Nash (born 7 February 2008) is a Dutch professional football player who plays as a winger for Eredivisie club Ajax and the Netherlands U18 national team. A product of the Ajax Youth Academy, he made his senior debut for the club in December 2025.

== Early life ==
Nash was born in Amsterdam and is of Ghanaian descent. He began his football career at local amateur side SV Ouderkerk before joining the youth academy of AFC Ajax in 2015 at the age of seven. He progressed through the academy's age groups at De Toekomst, playing for the U15, U17, and U19 squads.

== Club career ==
=== Ajax ===
After impressing in the youth ranks, particularly during the 2024–25 season with the U17s, Nash signed his first professional contract with Ajax on 14 February 2025, committing to the club until mid-2027.

In the first half of the 2025–26 season, Nash was promoted to Jong Ajax, the club's reserve team playing in the Eerste Divisie, where he made three appearances. He also featured prominently for the U19 side in the UEFA Youth League, scoring a brace in a 2–2 draw against Qarabag U19 on 10 December 2025.

Nash made his official debut for the Ajax senior team on 2 December 2025, in an Eredivisie match against FC Groningen. He came on as a late substitute in the 2–0 victory. Two weeks later, on 17 December 2025, he made his KNVB Cup debut in a second-round fixture against Excelsior Maassluis, playing 19 minutes in a comprehensive 7–2 win.

== International career ==
Nash is a dual national of the Netherlands and Ghana. He has represented the Netherlands at various youth levels. He was a regular for the Netherlands U15 in 2023.

In March 2025, Nash was called up to the Netherlands U17 squad for the crucial 2025 UEFA European Under-17 Championship qualification matches. Later that year, he progressed to the U18 team, scoring his first goal for the side in late 2025.

== Career statistics ==
=== Club ===
As of 28 January 2026

Appearances and goals by club, season and competition
Club	Season	League			Cup		Europe		Other		Total	
Club	Season	Division	Apps	Goals	Apps	Goals	Apps	Goals	Apps	Goals	Apps	Goals
Jong Ajax	2025–26	Eerste Divisie	5	0	—		—		—		5	0
Ajax	2025–26	Eredivisie	1	0	1	0	1 (Note: Appearance in UEFA Champions League)	0	—		3	0
Career total			6	0	1	0	1	0	0	0	8	0
