= Jong Ajax =

Dutch football club

Coordinates: 52°18′48″N 4°55′44″E

- Full name: Jong Ajax
- Nickname: Godenzonen (Sons of the Gods)
- Founded: 18 March 1900; 126 years ago
- Stadium: De Toekomst, Amsterdam (Ouder-Amstel)
- Capacity: 2,250
- Chairman: Ernst Boekhorst
- Head coach: Carlos García
- League: Eerste Divisie
- 2025–26: Eerste Divisie, 20th of 20
- Website: ajax.nl/jong-ajax
Home colours	Away colours	Third colours

Jong Ajax (Dutch pronunciation: [jɔŋ ˈaːjɑks]; lit. 'Young Ajax'), also referred to as Ajax II or Ajax 2, is the reserve team of Ajax. Based at the club's training complex, Sportpark De Toekomst, in Amsterdam, it has competed in the Eerste Divisie, the second tier of Dutch professional football, since 2013.

Jong Ajax is the only reserve side to have won a Dutch professional league title, claiming the 2017–18 Eerste Divisie with a squad that included Noussair Mazraoui, Noa Lang and Danilho Doekhi. Under national regulations, the team cannot be promoted to the Eredivisie or enter the KNVB Cup. Its primary purpose is to develop players for Ajax's senior squad.

== History ==
Jong Ajax (formerly more commonly known as Ajax 2). The team is composed mostly of professional footballers, who are often recent graduates from the highest youth level (Ajax A1)

Since 1992 Jong Ajax have competed in the Beloften Eredivisie, competing against other reserve teams such as Jong PSV, Jong FC Groningen or Jong AZ. It has won the Beloften Eredivisie title a record eight times, as well as the KNVB Reserve Cup three times, making it the most successful reserve squad in the Netherlands. By winning the Beloften Eredivisie title, Jong Ajax were able to qualify for the actual KNVB Cup, even advancing to the semi-finals on three occasions. Its best result in the Dutch Cup was under manager Jan Olde Riekerink in 2001–02, when a semi-final loss to FC Utrecht in a Penalty shoot-out after extra time, which saw Utrecht advance, and thus preventing an Ajax vs. Jong Ajax Dutch Cup final.

The 2013–14 season marked the Jupiler League debut of the AFC Ajax reserves' squad Jong Ajax. Previously playing in the Beloften Eredivisie (a separate league for reserve teams, not included in the Dutch professional or amateur league structure) players were allowed to move around freely between the reserve team and the first team during the course of the season. This is no longer the case as Jong Ajax now registers and fields a separate squad from that of Ajax first team for the Eerste Divisie, the second tier of professional football in the Netherlands. Its home matches are played at Sportpark De Toekomst, except for the occasional match in the Amsterdam Arena. The only period in which players are able to move between squads is during the transfer windows, unless the player has made less than 15 appearances for the first team, then he is still eligible to appear in both first team and second team matches during the course of the season. Furthermore, the team is not eligible for promotion to the Eredivisie or to participate in the KNVB Cup. Jong Ajax was joined in the Eerste Divisie by Jong FC Twente and Jong PSV, reserve teams that have also moved from the Beloften Eredivisie to the Eerste Divisie, replacing VV Katwijk, SC Veendam and AGOVV Apeldoorn, and increasing the total number of teams in the league from 16 to 20.

Jong Ajax left the Beloften Eredivisie in 2013, having held a 21-year tenure in the reserves league, and having won the league title a record eight times (1994, 1996, 1998, 2001, 2002, 2004, 2005, 2009).

== Players ==
=== Current squad ===
As of 6 October 2026

Note: Flags indicate national team as defined under FIFA eligibility rules; some limited exceptions apply. Players may hold more than one non-FIFA nationality.

No.	Pos.	Nation	Player
—	GK	MAR	Aymean El Hani
—	GK	NED	Joeri Heerkens
—	GK	ENG	Charlie Setford
—	GK	NED	Valentijn van der Velde
—	DF	NED	Jahyendrow Amour
—	DF	NED	Avery Appiah
—	DF	NED	Luuk Beekman
—	DF	NED	Sinclair de Falco
—	DF	NED	Leroy Fränkel
—	DF	NED	Dies Janse
—	DF	FRA	Marvyn Muzungu
—	DF	NED	Ryan van de Pavert
—	DF	ARG	Gerónimo Spina
—	DF	NED	Mylo van der Lans
—	DF	MAR	Fouad Zahouani
—	MF	NED	Mohamed Abdalla
—	MF	NED	Levi Acheampong
—	MF	MAR	Rayane Bounida

No.	Pos.	Nation	Player
—	MF	FRA	Abdoulaye Camara (on loan from Udinese)
—	MF	NED	Jinairo Johnson
—	MF	ESP	Jano Monserrate
—	MF	MAR	Abdellah Ouazane
—	MF	NED	Tijn Peters
—	MF	NED	Damián van der Vaart
—	MF	NED	Mark Verkuijl
—	FW	NED	Paulo da Silva
—	FW	POL	Jan Faberski
—	FW	SLE	David Kalokoh
—	FW	MAR	Elias Mechrouh
—	FW	NED	Luca Messori
—	FW	MAR	Anass Moumane
—	FW	NED	Pharell Nash
—	FW	ITA	Diego Pugno (on loan from Juventus)
—	FW	ESP	Leo Salazar (on loan from Espanyol)
—	FW	NED	Jeshurun Simeon
—	FW	NED	Emre Ünüvar

==== Out on loan ====
Note: Flags indicate national team as defined under FIFA eligibility rules; some limited exceptions apply. Players may hold more than one non-FIFA nationality.

No.	Pos.	Nation	Player
—	GK	GHA	Paul Reverson (at De Graafschap until 30 June 2027)
—	DF	NED	Gerald Alders (at Telstar until 30 June 2027)

No.	Pos.	Nation	Player
—	FW	NED	Julian Rijkhoff (at Andorra until 30 June 2027)

== Former head coaches ==
- (Netherlands) Hassie van Wijk
- (Netherlands) Aad de Mos
- (Netherlands) Pieter Huistra
- (Netherlands) Adrie Koster
- (Netherlands) Michel Kreek
- (Netherlands) Alfons Groenendijk
- (Netherlands) Jan Olde Riekerink
- (Netherlands) Sonny Silooy
- (Netherlands) Marco van Basten
- (Netherlands) Louis van Gaal
- (Netherlands) John van 't Schip
- (Netherlands) John van den Brom
- (Netherlands) Gerard van der Lem
- (Netherlands) Hans Westerhof
- (Netherlands) Aron Winter
- (Netherlands) Fred Grim
- (Netherlands) Gery Vink
- (Netherlands) Marcel Keizer
- (Netherlands) Michael Reiziger
- (Netherlands) Mitchell van der Gaag
- (Netherlands) John Heitinga
- (Netherlands) Willem Weijs

== Honours ==
=== Official trophies (recognized by UEFA and FIFA) ===
==== National ====
- Eerste Divisie (1): 2017–18
- Beloften Eredivisie (8): 1994, 1996, 1998, 2001, 2002, 2004, 2005, 2009
- KNVB Reserve Cup (3): 2003, 2004, 2012
- KNVB Amateur Cup (1): 1984
- KNVB District Cup (4): 1984, 1987, 1993, 1994
- KNVB Raven Cup (1) : 1956

==== International ====
- HKFC International Soccer Sevens Main Tournament – Shield winners: 2010

==== Other trophies ====
- Den Helder Maritime Tournament (2): 1996, 2010

== See also ==
- Ajax Youth Academy – Youth Academy of the club
