= 2024–25 Jong Ajax season =

Jong Ajax
2024–25 season
- Chairman: Ernst Boekhorst
- Manager: Frank Peereboom
- Stadium: Sportpark De Toekomst
- Eerste Divisie: 17th
- Average home league attendance: 772
- All statistics correct as of 9 May 2025.

During the 2024–25 season, Jong Ajax participates in the Dutch Eerste Divisie, the 2nd tier of professional football in the Netherlands. It was their 11th consecutive season in the Eerste Divisie.

== Squad ==
As of 3 February 2025

Note: Flags indicate national team as defined under FIFA eligibility rules; some limited exceptions apply. Players may hold more than one non-FIFA nationality.

No.	Pos.	Nation	Player
36	DF	NED	Dies Janse
41	MF	NED	Julian Brandes
42	DF	NED	Nick Verschuren
43	DF	NED	Aaron Bouwman
45	DF	NED	Precious Ugwu
46	DF	NED	Lucas Jetten
48	DF	MAR	Diyae Jermoumi
50	MF	POL	Jan Faberski
51	GK	ENG	Charlie Setford
52	GK	GHA	Paul Reverson
53	MF	NED	Rico Speksnijder

No.	Pos.	Nation	Player
54	MF	NED	Mark Verkuijl
55	MF	MAR	Rida Chahid
56	FW	NED	David Kalokoh
57	FW	NED	Yoram Boerhout
58	MF	NED	Nassef Chourak
59	FW	NED	Don-Angelo Konadu
61	MF	NED	Kayden Wolff
62	FW	NED	Skye Vink
63	MF	NED	Sean Steur
64	MF	BEL	Rayane Bounida
—	DF	BEL	Ethan Butera
—	DF	NED	Ryan van de Pavert

== Transfers ==
For a list of all Dutch football transfers in the summer window (24 June 2024 to 2 September 2024) please see List of Dutch football transfers summer 2024. For a list of all Dutch football transfers in the winter window (2 January 2025 to 4 February 2025) please see List of Dutch football transfers winter 2024–25.

=== Summer ===
In:

No.	Pos.	Nation	Player
—	GK	NED	Paul Reverson (from Ajax U18)
—	DF	NED	Gerald Alders (from Ajax U18)
—	DF	NED	Aaron Bouwman (from Ajax U18)
—	DF	NED	Dies Janse (from Ajax U18)
—	DF	NED	Lucas Jetten (from Ajax U18)
—	DF	BEL	Jorthy Mokio (from (Belgium) Gent)
—	DF	NED	Precious Ugwu (from Ajax U18)
—	DF	NED	Nick Verschuren (from Ajax U18)
—	MF	POL	Jan Faberski (from Ajax U18)
—	MF	NED	Sean Steur (from Ajax U18)
—	MF	NED	Rico Speksnijder (from Ajax U18)
—	MF	NED	Kayden Wolff (from Ajax U18)
—	FW	NED	Don-Angelo Konadu (from Ajax U18)
—	FW	NED	Skye Vink (from Ajax U18)

Out:

No.	Pos.	Nation	Player
36	FW	DEN	Christian Rasmussen (to Ajax, previously on loan at (Denmark) FC Nordsjælland)
42	FW	NED	Ar'jany Martha (to (Belgium) Beerschot)
43	DF	NED	Olivier Aertssen (to PEC Zwolle)
44	DF	SRB	Mateja Milovanović (to SC Heerenveen)
45	DF	NED	Oualid Agougil (released to Jong FC Utrecht)
46	FW	NED	Raphaël Sarfo (to (Belgium) Patro Eisden)
47	DF	NED	Tristan Gooijer (on loan to PEC Zwolle)
50	MF	NED	Gabriel Misehouy (to (Spain) Girona)
52	GK	NED	Sten Kremers (to De Graafschap)
53	GK	NED	Tom de Graaff (to FC Utrecht)

=== Winter ===
In:

No.	Pos.	Nation	Player
54	MF	NED	Mark Verkuijl (from Ajax U18)
64	MF	BEL	Rayane Bounida (from Ajax U18)
—	DF	NED	Ryan van de Pavert (from Ajax U18)

Out:

No.	Pos.	Nation	Player
31	DF	BEL	Jorthy Mokio (to Ajax)
47	DF	NED	Gerald Alders (on loan at FC Twente)
49	FW	NED	Jaydon Banel (to Burnley)

== Competitions ==
=== Eerste Divisie ===
==== League table ====
Pos	Team	Pld	W	D	L	GF	GA	GD	Pts	Promotion or qualification
15	MVV Maastricht	38	10	10	18	52	59	−7	40	
16	TOP Oss	38	8	14	16	31	60	−29	38	
17	Jong Ajax	38	9	9	20	37	52	−15	36	Reserve teams are not eligible to be promoted to the Eredivisie
18	Jong PSV	38	8	6	24	55	86	−31	30	Reserve teams are not eligible to be promoted to the Eredivisie
19	Jong FC Utrecht	38	4	11	23	31	82	−51	23	Reserve teams are not eligible to be promoted to the Eredivisie

Source: Flashscore, Keuken Kampioen Divisie (in Dutch)
Rules for classification: Season in progress: 1) Most points won; 2) Less points lost; 3) Goal difference; 4) Goals scored; 5) Alphabetical order; End of season: 1) Points; 2) Goal difference; 3) Goals scored; 4) Head-to-head points; 5) Head-to-head goal difference; 6) Head-to-head away goals scored; 7) Play-off if relevant for deciding champion, relegation or participating in a European league, otherwise by draw. 8) Penalty shoot-out (only after a play-off)

==== Results summary ====
Overall								Home						Away					
Pld	W	D	L	GF	GA	GD	Pts	W	D	L	GF	GA	GD	W	D	L	GF	GA	GD
38	9	9	20	37	52	−15	36	6	6	7	20	17	+3	3	3	13	17	35	−18

Last updated: 9 May 2025.
Source: Keuken Kampionen Divisie

==== Results by round ====
Round	1	2	3	4	5	6	7	8	9	10	11	12	13	14	15	16	17	18	19	20	21	22	23	24	25	26	27	28	29	30	31	32	33	34	35	36	37	38
Ground	A	H	A	H	H	A	A	H	A	H	H	A	H	A	A	H	A	H	A	H	A	H	A	A	H	A	H	H	A	A	H	H	A	H	A	H	A	H
Result	D	D	W	L	L	W	D	L	D	D	D	L	L	L	L	W	L	W	L	W	L	W	L	W	W	L	D	L	L	L	L	L	L	D	L	W	L	D
Position	8	14	5	11	13	8	10	13	14	14	14	15	16	16	17	17	17	15	16	16	16	16	17	15	14	14	14	14	15	15	15	16	17	17	17	17	17	17

Updated to match(es) played on 9 May 2025. Source: Keuken Kampionen Divisie
A = Away; H = Home; W = Win; D = Draw; L = Loss

==== Matches ====
12 August 2024 1	Jong PSV	2−2	Jong Ajax	Eindhoven
20:00 CEST	Pepi 55', (yellow card) 57'; Driouech 90' (pen.)	Report	Kaplan (yellow card) 57', (goal) 90+5'; Konadu (penalty missed) 72'; Van de Blaak 85' (o.g.); Setford (yellow card) 90'	Stadium: De Herdgang; Attendance: 1,450; Referee: Luuk Timmer

19 August 2024 2	Jong Ajax	0−0	MVV Maastricht	Duivendrecht
20:00 CEST	Faberski (yellow card) 81'	Report	Smeets (yellow card) 35'; Zeegers (yellow card) 60'	Stadium: Sportpark De Toekomst; Attendance: 777; Referee: Martijn Vos

24 August 2024 3	FC Eindhoven	0−3	Jong Ajax	Eindhoven
16:30 CEST	Simons (yellow card) 68'	Report	Rijkhoff 8' (pen.), 65'; Jetten (yellow card) 43'; Speksnijder (yellow card) 55'; Faberski 80'	Stadium: Jan Louwers Stadion; Attendance: 3,740; Referee: Jannick van der Laan

30 August 2024 4	Jong Ajax	1−2	FC Den Bosch	Duivendrecht
20:00 CEST	Rijkhoff 24'; Faberski (yellow card) 38'; Janse (yellow card) 69'	Report	Burgering 6'; Henderikx (yellow card) 35'; Bakaľa (yellow card) 39'; Van den Bogert (yellow card) 71'; Knöll (yellow card) 86'; Acheffay 88'	Stadium: Sportpark De Toekomst; Attendance: 727; Referee: Boyd van Kommer

13 September 2024 6	SC Cambuur	0−1	Jong Ajax	Leeuwarden
20:00 CEST	Kieftenbeld (yellow card) 26'; Diemers (yellow card) 85'; Van Mullem (yellow card) 88'	Report	Mokio (yellow card) 44' (goal) 51'; Jetten (yellow card) 56'; Chahid (yellow card) 90+2'	Stadium: Kooi Stadion; Referee: Kevin Puts

17 September 2024 5	Jong Ajax	1−2	Jong AZ Alkmaar	Duivendrecht
20:00 CEST	Chourak (yellow card) 9'; Kaplan (yellow card) 23' (yellow-red card) 45+2'; Banel 45+1'; Setford (yellow card) 52'; Konadu (yellow card) 60'; Verschuren (yellow card) 88'; Chahid (yellow card) 90+1'	Report	Daal (yellow card) 19'; Zeefuik (penalty missed) 45+3', (yellow card) 76'; Addai 55', 58' (pen.); Smit (yellow card) 73'	Stadium: Sportpark De Toekomst; Referee: Wouter Wiersma

21 September 2024 7	Vitesse	2−2	Jong Ajax	Arnhem
18:45 CEST	Visser 31'; Yegoian 62'; Jonathans (yellow card) 67'; De Regt (yellow card) 76'	Report	Hlynsson 20'; Rijkhoff 34'; Mokio (yellow card) 47'	Stadium: GelreDome; Attendance: 18,000; Referee: Robin Vereijken

30 September 2024 8	Jong Ajax	0−1	FC Dordrecht	Duivendrecht
20:00 CEST	Hlynsson (yellow card) 26'; Faberski (yellow card) 45+1'; Janse (yellow card) 63' (yellow-red card) 90+3'; Tahirović (yellow card) 68'; Wolff (yellow card) 73'	Report	Haen 41'; Van der Avert (yellow card) 90+4'	Stadium: Sportpark De Toekomst; Attendance: 606; Referee: Luuk Timmer

4 October 2024 9	Helmond Sport	1−1	Jong Ajax	Helmond
20:00 CEST	Halhal (yellow card) 48' (red card) 90+3', (goal) 84'; Ostrc (yellow card) 90+1'	Report	Wolff 53'; Verschuren (yellow card) 84'; Brandes (yellow card) 84'; Speksnijder (yellow card) 90+2'	Stadium: GS Staalwerken Stadion; Attendance: 3,543; Referee: Laurens Gerrets

18 October 2024 11	Jong Ajax	0−0	Jong FC Utrecht	Duivendrecht
20:00 CEST	Chourak (yellow card) 45+1'; Mokio (yellow card) 45+3'; Verschuren (yellow card) 90'	Report	Blake (yellow card) 40'; Akkerman (yellow card) 57'; Mukeh (yellow card) 86'	Stadium: Sportpark De Toekomst; Attendance: 573; Referee: Rick Sturm

21 October 2024 10	Jong Ajax	0−0	ADO Den Haag	Duivendrecht
20:00 CEST	Alders (yellow card) 8'; Janse (yellow card) 88'	Report	Vlak (yellow card) 10'; Van der Sloot (red card) 31'; Nikiema (yellow card) 86'; Tomas (yellow card) 87'	Stadium: Sportpark De Toekomst; Attendance: 618; Referee: Kevin Puts

25 October 2024 12	Roda JC Kerkrade	2−1	Jong Ajax	Kerkrade
20:00 CEST	Džepar 14'; Bouwman 49' (o.g.); Çukur (penalty missed) 81'	Report	Chourak 63'	Stadium: Parkstad Limburg Stadion; Attendance: 8,172; Referee: Martijn Vos

1 November 2024 13	Jong Ajax	0−1	VVV-Venlo	Duivendrecht
20:00 CET		Report	Gyamfi (yellow card) 30'; Doumtsios 39'; Janssen (yellow card) 67'	Stadium: Sportpark De Toekomst; Attendance: 932; Referee: Shona Shukrula

8 November 2024 14	FC Emmen	4−2	Jong Ajax	Emmen
20:00 CET	Mulder (yellow card) 12', (goal) 48'; Kade 31'; Evina 54'; Te Wierik (yellow card) 57'; Nunumete (yellow card) 74'; Sadiku 90+4'	Report	Banel 12' (pen.), (yellow card) 13'; Mokio 19'	Stadium: De Oude Meerdijk; Attendance: 7,826; Referee: Robin Vereijken

22 November 2024 16	Jong Ajax	3−0	SC Telstar	Duivendrecht
20:00 CET	Konadu 20'; Faberski (yellow card) 61', (goal) 64'; Mokio (yellow card) 77'; Banel 90+2'	Report	Dirks (yellow card) 24'; El Kachati (yellow card) 77'; Apau (yellow card) 83'	Stadium: Sportpark De Toekomst; Attendance: 767; Referee: Stan Teuben

25 November 2024 15	FC Volendam	3−0	Jong Ajax	Volendam
20:00 CET	Ould-Chikh 17'; Kuwas (yellow card) 32'; Mühren 42', 90+8' (pen.); Payne (yellow card) 52'; Bukala (yellow card) 86'	Report	Setford (yellow card) 90+7'	Stadium: Kras Stadion; Attendance: 5,784; Referee: Laurens Gerrets

29 November 2024 17	Excelsior	2−0	Jong Ajax	Rotterdam
20:00 CET	Naujoks 2'; Duijvestijn 29'	Report	Verschuren (yellow card) 37'; Konadu (yellow card) 59'; Faberski (yellow card) 68'	Stadium: Van Donge & De Roo Stadion; Attendance: 4,157; Referee: Kevin Puts

9 December 2024 18	Jong Ajax	2−0	De Graafschap	Duivendrecht
20:00 CET	Rasmussen 12'; Bounida 90+7'	Report		Stadium: Sportpark De Toekomst; Attendance: 732; Referee: Luuk Timmer

13 December 2024 19	TOP Oss	2−1	Jong Ajax	Oss
20:00 CET	Stensrud (penalty missed) 37'; Kuijpers 54', (yellow card) 55'; Korte 80' (pen.)	Report	Verschuren (yellow card) 52'; Bounida 62'; Setford (yellow card) 78'	Stadium: Frans Heesen Stadion; Attendance: 2,188; Referee: Martijn Vos

23 December 2024 20	Jong Ajax	3−1	Roda JC Kerkrade	Duivendrecht
20:00 CET	Chourak 5'; Rijkhoff 28' (pen.); Faberski 90+1'	Report	Seedorf 8'; Džepar (yellow card) 86'	Stadium: Sportpark De Toekomst; Attendance: 1,135; Referee: Clay Ruperti

13 January 2025 21	Jong AZ	2−1	Jong Ajax	Alkmaar
20:00 CET	Smit 58'; Bouziane 66'; Esajas (yellow card) 69'	Report	Alders (yellow card) 4'; Bounida 45+4'; Banel (yellow card) 50'	Stadium: AFAS Trainingscomplex; Referee: Stan Teuben

20 January 2025 22	Jong Ajax	4−0	Jong PSV	Duivendrecht
20:00 CET	Verschuren (yellow card) 1'; Rijkhoff 17' (pen.), 55', 90+5'; Bounida 28'	Report	Uneken (penalty missed) 2'	Stadium: Sportpark De Toekomst; Attendance: 589; Referee: Rick Sturm

25 January 2025 23	SC Telstar	3−0	Jong Ajax	Velsen
16:30 CET	Eddahchouri 21', 40'; Noslin 49', (yellow card) 53'; Offerhaus (yellow card) 51'	Report		Stadium: BUKO Stadion; Attendance: 3,102; Referee: Martijn Vos

10 February 2025 25	Jong Ajax	3−2	Excelsior	Duivendrecht
20:00 CET	Kaplan 53'; Bounida 57'; Vunk 81'	Report	Van de Pavert 22' (o.g.); Sanches Fernandes (yellow card) 51'; Bronkhorst 60'; Raatsie (yellow card) 74'; Bergraaf (yellow card) 90+5'	Stadium: Sportpark De Toekomst; Attendance: 616; Referee: Laurens Gerrets

14 February 2025 26	ADO Den Haag	1−0	Jong Ajax	The Hague
20:00 CET	Bonis (penalty missed) 29', (yellow card) 64'; Sylla (yellow card) 42'; Hämäläinen (yellow card) 44'; Tomas (yellow card) 45+4'; Reischl 57'; Kilo (yellow card) 82'	Report	Rijkhoff (yellow card) 25'; Faberski (yellow card) 42'	Stadium: Bingoal Stadion; Attendance: 8,235; Referee: Erwin Blank

24 February 2025 27	Jong Ajax	1−1	SC Cambuur	Duivendrecht
20:00 CET	Ugwu 55'; Jetten (yellow card) 59'	Report	Rölke (yellow card) 25'; Hilterman 63', (yellow card) 83'; Mercera (yellow card) 87'; De Leeuw (yellow card) 90+6'	Stadium: Sportpark De Toekomst; Attendance: 623; Referee: Clay Ruperti

28 February 2025 24	Jong FC Utrecht	1−2	Jong Ajax	Utrecht
20:00 CET	Jenner (yellow card) 41' (yellow-red card) 53'; Akkerman 89'	Report	Brandes 19'; Bounida 42'	Stadium: Sportcomplex Zoudenbalch; Attendance: 334; Referee: Robin Vereijken
Note: The game was originally scheduled for 3 February, but it was postponed due to a frozen pitch.

3 March 2025 28	Jong Ajax	0−2	FC Eindhoven	Duivendrecht
20:00 CET	Ugwu (red card) 27'	Report	Deenen 68'; Huisman (yellow card) 80'; Simons 88'	Stadium: Sportpark De Toekomst; Attendance: 560; Referee: Luuk Timmer

7 March 2025 29	VVV-Venlo	1−0	Jong Ajax	Venlo
20:00 CET	Blancquart (yellow card) 22'; Mokono (yellow card) 67'; Matoug 70'	Report	Jetten (yellow card) 25'; Chahid (yellow card) 70'	Stadium: Covebo Stadion - De Koel; Attendance: 6,107; Referee: Stan Teuben

11 March 2025 31	Jong Ajax	0–2	FC Emmen	Duivendrecht
20:00 CET	Verschuren (yellow card) 36'; Reverson (yellow card) 66'	Report	Bakir 38'; Hawkins 66'; Wagner (yellow card) 77'; Hoekstra (yellow card) 85'; Martin (yellow card) 87'	Stadium: Sportpark De Toekomst; Attendance: 678; Referee: Kevin Puts

16 March 2025 30	FC Den Bosch	3–1	Jong Ajax	's-Hertogenbosch
16:45 CET	Henderikx (yellow card) 17'; Burgering 45'; Johnson 56' (o.g.); Boumassaoudi (yellow card) 73'; Van Leeuwen 78'; De Groot (yellow card) 87'; Van Hedel (yellow card) 90+1'	Report	Verkuijl (yellow card) 2'; Rijkhoff 19'; Van de Pavert (yellow card) 52'	Stadium: De Vliert; Attendance: 5,570; Referee: Wouter Wiersma

31 March 2025 32	Jong Ajax	0–2	FC Volendam	Duivendrecht
20:00 CEST	Johnson (yellow card) 57'	Report	Van de Pavert 37' (o.g.); Jacobs 63'	Stadium: Sportpark De Toekomst; Attendance: 1,644; Referee: Thomas Hardeman

4 April 2025 33	FC Dordrecht	3−0	Jong Ajax	Dordrecht
20:00 CEST	Schuurman 19'; Van der Sluijs (yellow card) 56'; Haen 70'; Seydoux (yellow card) 81', (goal) 90+3'	Report	Verschuren (yellow card) 56'	Stadium: M-Scores Stadion; Attendance: 4,045; Referee: Luuk Timmer

14 April 2025 34	Jong Ajax	1−1	Vitesse	Duivendrecht
20:00 CEST	Faberski 30'; Ugwu (yellow card) 56'; Jetten (yellow card) 64'	Report	Postma (yellow card) 16'; Koller (yellow card) 77'; Huisman 80'	Stadium: Sportpark De Toekomst; Attendance: 968; Referee: Martin Pérez

19 April 2025 35	De Graafschap	2−0	Jong Ajax	Doetinchem
21:00 CET	Cooper-Love 2'; Warmerdam 5'	Report		Stadium: De Vijverberg; Attendance: 11,560; Referee: Clay Ruperti

28 April 2025 36	Jong Ajax	1−0	Helmond Sport	Duivendrecht
20:00 CEST	Verkuijl (yellow card) 15'; Faberski (yellow card) 77'; Janse 85'	Report	Van Den Eynden (yellow card) 30'; Van den Hurk (yellow card) 40'	Stadium: Sportpark De Toekomst; Attendance: 590; Referee: Kevin Puts

2 May 2025 37	MVV Maastricht	1−0	Jong Ajax	Maastricht
20:00 CEST	Mmaee (penalty missed) 76'; Klaasen 90+2'	Report		Stadium: De Geusselt; Attendance: 3,400; Referee: Luuk Timmer

9 May 2025 38	Jong Ajax	0−0	TOP Oss	Duivendrecht
20:00 CEST	Wolff (yellow card) 64' (yellow-red card) 78'	Report	Allemeersch (yellow card) 23'; Miguel (yellow card) 80'	Stadium: Sportpark De Toekomst; Attendance: 680; Referee: Thomas Hardeman

== Statistics ==
=== Appearances and goals ===
No.	Pos.	Nat	Name	Total		Eerste Divisie		Discipline		
No.	Pos.	Nat	Name	Apps	Goals	Apps	Goals	Yellow card	Second yellow card	Red card
	GK	(Netherlands) NED	Paul Reverson	14	0	14	0	1	0	0
	GK	(England) ENG	Charlie Setford	20	0	20	0	4	0	0
	DF	(Netherlands) NED	Aaron Bouwman	14	0	11+3	0	0	0	0
	DF	(Belgium) BEL	Ethan Butera	2	0	1+1	0	0	0	0
	DF	(Netherlands) NED	Dies Janse	20	1	20	1	2	1	0
	DF	(Morocco) MAR	Diyae Jermoumi	16	0	4+12	0	0	0	0
	DF	(Netherlands) NED	Lucas Jetten	33	0	28+5	0	5	0	0
	DF	(Netherlands) NED	Ryan van de Pavert	10	0	7+3	0	1	0	0
	DF	(Netherlands) NED	Precious Ugwu	28	1	17+11	1	1	0	1
	DF	(Netherlands) NED	Nick Verschuren	33	0	31+2	0	8	0	0
	MF	(Belgium) BEL	Rayane Bounida	19	6	13+6	6	0	0	0
	MF	(Netherlands) NED	Julian Brandes	25	1	14+11	1	1	0	0
	MF	(Morocco) MAR	Rida Chahid	15	0	1+14	0	3	0	0
	MF	(Netherlands) NED	Nassef Chourak	21	2	15+6	2	2	0	0
	MF	(Poland) POL	Jan Faberski	34	4	26+8	4	7	0	0
	MF	(Netherlands) NED	Rico Speksnijder	17	0	7+10	0	2	0	0
	MF	(Netherlands) NED	Sean Steur	28	0	24+4	0	0	0	0
	MF	(Netherlands) NED	Kayden Wolff	16	1	10+6	1	2	1	0
	MF	(Netherlands) NED	Mark Verkuijl	24	0	18+6	0	2	0	0
	FW	(Netherlands) NED	Yoram Boerhout	13	0	3+10	0	0	0	0
	FW	(Netherlands) NED	David Kalokoh	24	0	9+15	0	0	0	0
	FW	(Netherlands) NED	Don-Angelo Konadu	20	1	16+4	1	2	0	0
	FW	(Netherlands) NED	Skye Vink	22	1	4+18	1	0	0	0
First team players who have made appearances for reserve squad:
	GK	(Germany) GER	Diant Ramaj	4	0	4	0	0	0	0
	DF	(Turkey) TUR	Ahmetcan Kaplan	3	2	3	2	1	1	0
	DF	(Belgium) BEL	Jorthy Mokio	17	2	14+3	2	4	0	0
	MF	(Iceland) ISL	Kristian Hlynsson	7	1	7	1	1	0	0
	MF	(Norway) NOR	Sivert Mannsverk	3	0	3	0	0	0	0
	MF	(Netherlands) NED	Youri Regeer	2	0	2	0	0	0	0
	MF	(Bosnia and Herzegovina) BIH	Benjamin Tahirović	1	0	1	0	1	0	0
	MF	(Netherlands) NED	Silvano Vos	1	0	1	0	0	0	0
	FW	(Netherlands) NED	Amourricho van Axel Dongen	3	0	0+3	0	0	0	0
	FW	(Denmark) DEN	Christian Rasmussen	2	1	2	1	0	0	0
	FW	(Netherlands) NED	Julian Rijkhoff	29	9	24+5	9	2	0	0
Youth players who have made appearances for reserve squad:
	DF	(Netherlands) NED	Lyfe Oldenstam	1	0	0+1	0	0	0	0
	MF	(Netherlands) NED	Avery Appiah	3	0	3	0	0	0	0
	MF	(Netherlands) NED	Jinairo Johnson	12	0	7+5	0	1	0	0
	MF	(Italy) ITA	Luca Messori	1	0	0+1	0	0	0	0
	FW	(Denmark) DEN	Lasse Abildgaard	1	0	0+1	0	0	0	0
	FW	(Netherlands) NED	Emre Ünüvar	2	0	0+2	0	0	0	0
Players sold or loaned out after the start of the season:
	DF	(Netherlands) NED	Olivier Aertssen	1	0	0+1	0	0	0	0
	MF	(Netherlands) NED	Gerald Alders	23	0	20+3	0	2	0	0
	FW	(Netherlands) NED	Jaydon Banel	15	3	14+1	3	1	0	0

Last updated: 9 May 2025
Source: Competitions

=== Clean sheets ===
Rank	Pos	Nat	Name	Eerste Divisie	Matches
1	GK	(England)	Charlie Setford	6	20
2	GK	(Germany)	Diant Ramaj	3	4
3	GK	(Netherlands)	Paul Reverson	1	14
Totals				10	38

Last updated: 9 May 2025
