= 2023–24 Jong Ajax season =

Jong Ajax
2023–24 season
- Chairman: Frank Eijken
- Manager: Dave Vos (until 23 October 2023); Yuri Rose (interim, 23-30 October 2023); Dave Vos (since 30 October 2023)
- Stadium: Sportpark De Toekomst
- Eerste Divisie: 15th
- Top goalscorer: Jaydon Banel (7)
Home colours	Away colours	Third colours

During the 2023–24 season, Jong Ajax participated in the Dutch Eerste Divisie, the 2nd tier of professional football in the Netherlands. It is their 10th consecutive season in the Eerste Divisie.

== Squad ==
As of 1 September 2023

Note: Flags indicate national team as defined under FIFA eligibility rules; some limited exceptions apply. Players may hold more than one non-FIFA nationality.

No.	Pos.	Nation	Player
39	FW	BEL	Mika Godts
41	MF	NED	Julian Brandes
42	FW	NED	Ar'jany Martha
43	DF	NED	Olivier Aertssen
44	DF	SRB	Mateja Milovanović
45	DF	NED	Oualid Agougil
46	FW	NED	Raphaël Sarfo
47	DF	NED	Tristan Gooijer
48	DF	MAR	Diyae Jermoumi
49	FW	NED	Jaydon Banel

No.	Pos.	Nation	Player
50	MF	NED	Gabriel Misehouy
51	GK	ENG	Charlie Setford
52	GK	NED	Sten Kremers
53	GK	NED	Tom de Graaff
54	GK	ENG	Tommy Setford
55	MF	MAR	Rida Chahid
56	FW	NED	David Kalokoh
57	FW	NED	Yoram Boerhout
58	MF	NED	Nassef Chourak
—	DF	BEL	Ethan Butera

== Transfers ==
For a list of all Dutch football transfers in the summer window (13 June 2023 to 1 September 2023) please see List of Dutch football transfers summer 2023. For a list of all Dutch football transfers in the winter window (2 January 2024 to 1 February 2024) please see List of Dutch football transfers winter 2023–24.

=== Summer ===
In:

No.	Pos.	Nation	Player
—	DF	NED	Oualid Agougil (from Ajax U18)
—	DF	BEL	Ethan Butera (from (Belgium) Anderlecht)
—	MF	MAR	Rida Chahid (from Ajax U18)
—	MF	NED	Nassef Chourak (from Ajax U18)
—	MF	BEL	Stanis Idumbo Muzambo (from Ajax U18)
—	FW	NED	Yoram Boerhout (from Ajax U18)
—	FW	NED	David Kalokoh (from Ajax U18)
—	FW	NED	Raphaël Sarfo (from Ajax U18)

Out:

No.	Pos.	Nation	Player
36	FW	NED	Amourricho van Axel Dongen (to Ajax)
36	FW	DEN	Christian Rasmussen (on loan at (Denmark) FC Nordsjælland)
38	MF	ISL	Kristian Hlynsson (to Ajax)
40	FW	NED	Sontje Hansen (to NEC)
41	MF	NED	Silvano Vos (to Ajax)
45	MF	NED	Donny Warmerdam (to De Graafschap)
46	MF	ECU	Patrickson Delgado (loan return to (Ecuador) Independiente del Valle)
49	FW	NED	Max de Waal (to Willem II, previously on loan at ADO Den Haag)
57	DF	NED	Jorrel Hato (to Ajax)
—	DF	NED	Anass Salah-Eddine (to Ajax, previously on loan at FC Twente)

=== Winter ===
In:

No.	Pos.	Nation	Player

Out:

No.	Pos.	Nation	Player
59	MF	BEL	Stanis Idumbo Muzambo (to (Spain) Sevilla FC)

== Competitions ==
=== Eerste Divisie ===
==== League table ====
Pos	Team	Pld	W	D	L	GF	GA	GD	Pts	Promotion or qualification
13	Cambuur	38	13	8	17	71	74	−3	47	
14	Eindhoven	38	9	16	13	45	57	−12	43	
15	Jong Ajax	38	10	10	18	54	69	−15	40	Reserve teams are not eligible to be promoted to the Eredivisie
16	Jong PSV	38	11	7	20	63	81	−18	40	Reserve teams are not eligible to be promoted to the Eredivisie
17	Telstar	38	9	8	21	47	68	−21	35	

Source: Flashscore, Keuken Kampioen Divisie (in Dutch)
Rules for classification: Season in progress: 1) Most points won; 2) Less points lost; 3) Goal difference; 4) Goals scored; 5) Alphabetical order; End of season: 1) Points; 2) Goal difference; 3) Goals scored; 4) Head-to-head points; 5) Head-to-head goal difference; 6) Head-to-head away goals scored; 7) Play-off if relevant for deciding champion, relegation or participating in a European league, otherwise by draw. 8) Penalty shoot-out (only after a play-off)

==== Period 1 ====
Pos	Team	Pld	W	D	L	GF	GA	GD	Pts	Qualification
16	MVV Maastricht	9	3	1	5	14	17	−3	10	
17	Den Bosch	9	3	0	6	11	15	−4	9	
18	Jong Ajax	9	1	2	6	16	24	−8	5	Reserves teams cannot participate in the promotion play-offs
19	TOP Oss	9	1	1	7	7	13	−6	4	
20	Telstar	9	1	1	7	8	18	−10	4	

Source: Keuken Kampioen Divisie (in Dutch)
Rules for classification: 1) points; 2) goal difference; 3) number of goals scored

==== Period 2 ====
Pos	Team	Pld	W	D	L	GF	GA	GD	Pts	Qualification
7	Dordrecht	10	4	4	2	21	14	+7	16	
8	Groningen	10	4	4	2	16	9	+7	16	
9	Jong Ajax	10	4	4	2	15	14	+1	16	Reserves teams cannot participate in the promotion play-offs
10	Roda JC Kerkrade	10	4	4	2	9	8	+1	16	Period 1 winner
11	Emmen	10	4	2	4	11	13	−2	14	

Source: Keuken Kampioen Divisie (in Dutch)
Rules for classification: 1) points; 2) goal difference; 3) number of goals scored

==== Period 3 ====
Pos	Team	Pld	W	D	L	GF	GA	GD	Pts	Qualification
14	Jong PSV	10	2	4	4	19	21	−2	10	Reserves teams cannot participate in the promotion play-offs
15	Telstar	10	2	4	4	11	16	−5	10	
16	Jong Ajax	10	2	3	5	11	14	−3	9	Reserves teams cannot participate in the promotion play-offs
17	Cambuur	10	2	2	6	17	23	−6	8	
18	Emmen	10	2	1	7	10	20	−10	7	

Source: Keuken Kampioen Divisie (in Dutch)
Rules for classification: 1) points; 2) goal difference; 3) number of goals scored

==== Period 4 ====
Pos	Team	Pld	W	D	L	GF	GA	GD	Pts	Qualification
12	TOP Oss	9	3	2	4	9	16	−7	11	
13	NAC Breda	9	2	4	3	12	15	−3	10	
14	Jong Ajax	9	3	1	5	12	17	−5	10	Reserves teams cannot participate in the promotion play-offs
15	Den Bosch	9	3	1	5	11	16	−5	10	
16	ADO Den Haag	9	2	3	4	12	14	−2	9	

Source: Keuken Kampioen Divisie (in Dutch)
Rules for classification: 1) points; 2) goal difference; 3) number of goals scored

==== Results summary ====
Overall								Home						Away					
Pld	W	D	L	GF	GA	GD	Pts	W	D	L	GF	GA	GD	W	D	L	GF	GA	GD
38	10	10	18	54	69	−15	40	8	5	6	28	23	+5	2	5	12	26	46	−20

Last updated: 10 May 2024.
Source: Keuken Kampionen Divisie

==== Results by round ====
Round	1	2	3	4	5	6	7	8	9	10	11	12	13	14	15	16	17	18	19	20	21	22	23	24	25	26	27	28	29	30	31	32	33	34	35	36	37	38
Ground	A	H	A	A	A	H	H	A	H	H	A	A	H	A	H	H	A	H	A	A	H	A	H	A	H	A	H	A	H	H	A	A	H	H	A	H	A	H
Result	L	L	L	L	L	D	D	L	W	D	L	L	W	D	W	W	D	W	D	D	L	D	D	W	W	L	L	L	L	W	W	L	L	W	L	D	L	L
Position	19	20	20	20	20	19	19	20	18	20	20	20	19	17	16	15	16	15	15	15	15	15	15	15	14	15	15	15	15	15	15	15	15	14	14	14	14	15

Source: Keuken Kampionen Divisie
A = Away; H = Home; W = Win; D = Draw; L = Loss

==== Matches ====
11 August 2023 1	FC Groningen	4−1	Jong Ajax	Groningen
20:00 CEST	Rente 32'; Postema 55'; Suslov 72'; Peersman (yellow card) 84'; Balker (yellow card) 86'; Hove 90+5'	Report	Hlynsson (yellow card) 24'; Rasmussen 84'; Gooijer (yellow card) 84'	Stadium: Hitachi Capital Mobility Stadion; Attendance: 20,502; Referee: Martijn Vos

21 August 2023 2	Jong Ajax	1−2	De Graafschap	Duivendrecht
20:00 CEST	Martha (yellow card) 63'; Hlynsson 79'	Report	Önal 6', (yellow card) 35'; Lammers (yellow card) 41'; Hillen (yellow card) 44'; Flakus Bosilj 59'; Warmerdam (yellow card) 80'; Wevers (yellow card) 90+6'	Stadium: Sportpark De Toekomst; Attendance: 1,460; Referee: Kevin Puts

25 August 2023 3	SC Cambuur	4−2	Jong Ajax	Leeuwarden
20:00 CEST	Van der Water 10'; Breij 17'; Balk 25'; Caschili (yellow card) 45+2'; Smit 58' (pen.)	Report	Misehouy 8'; Chahid 31'; Gooijer (yellow card) 57'	Stadium: Cambuur Stadion; Attendance: 9,600; Referee: Martin Pérez

1 September 2023 4	MVV Maastricht	2−1	Jong Ajax	Maastricht
20:00 CEST	Kostons 3', 13', (yellow card) 42'; Coomans (yellow card) 64'; Souren (red card) 75'; Matthys (yellow card) 90+1'	Report	Gooijer (yellow card) 42'; Misehouy 87', (yellow card) 90+1'; Vos (yellow card) 90+4'; Agougil (yellow card) 90+5'	Stadium: De Geusselt; Attendance: 5,407; Referee: Luuk Timmer

15 September 2023 6	Jong Ajax	3−3	FC Emmen	Duivendrecht
20:00 CEST	Kalokoh 12'; Godts 19'; Vos (yellow card) 39'; Hlynsson 90+1'	Report	Ubbink 57'; Scholte 73', 82'; Vlak (yellow card) 88'; Brouwer (yellow card) 90+3'	Stadium: Sportpark De Toekomst; Attendance: 1,082; Referee: Robin Hensgens

18 September 2023 5	Jong AZ	5−2	Jong Ajax	Alkmaar
20:00 CEST	Kasius 7'; Poku 12'; Schouten (yellow card) 31'; Goes (yellow card) 45+1'; Reverson 49'; Kewal 75'; Smit 87'	Report	Misehouy 6'; Brandes 34'; Godts (yellow card) 45+1'	Stadium: AFAS Trainingscomplex; Attendance: 878; Referee: Michael Eijgelsheim

25 September 2023 7	Jong Ajax	1−1	FC Eindhoven	Duivendrecht
20:00 CEST	Banel 38'; Aertssen (yellow card) 90+1'	Report	Seedorf (yellow card) 46'; Limouri (yellow card) 67'; Simons (yellow card) 80'; Kökcü 90+2'	Stadium: Sportpark De Toekomst; Attendance: 742; Referee: Boyd van Kommer

29 September 2023 8	SC Telstar	3−2	Jong Ajax	Velsen
20:00 CEST	Eddahchouri 11'; Gravenberch 47'; Van den Heerik (yellow card) 83', (goal) 90+5'	Report	Misehouy 10', 87'; Salah-Eddine (yellow card) 41'; Godts (yellow card) 74'; Agougil (yellow card) 90'	Stadium: BUKO Stadion; Attendance: 3,222; Referee: Thomas Hardeman

6 October 2023 9	Jong Ajax	3−0	VVV-Venlo	Duivendrecht
20:00 CEST	Hlynsson 20'; Salah-Eddine 32'; Godts 56'; Chourak (yellow card) 71'	Report	Rutten (yellow card) 19'	Stadium: Sportpark De Toekomst; Attendance: 814; Referee: Wouter Wiersma

20 October 2023 11	FC Dordrecht	4−0	Jong Ajax	Dordrecht
20:00 CET	Kriwak 25'; Shein 33'; Bronkhorst 36'; Van der Avert 67'	Report	Chourak (yellow card) 22'; Agougil (yellow card) 42'	Stadium: Matchoholic Stadion; Attendance: 2,847; Referee: Arne De Beuckelaer

23 October 2023 10	Jong Ajax	0−0	ADO Den Haag	Duivendrecht
20:00 CEST	Gooijer (yellow card) 43'; Verschuren (yellow card) 88'	Report	Van Hintum (yellow card) 56'	Stadium: Sportpark De Toekomst; Attendance: 847; Referee: Clay Ruperti

27 October 2023 12	Roda JC Kerkrade	2−1	Jong Ajax	Kerkrade
20:00 CEST	Peña 14'; Krasniqi (yellow card) 21'; Ould-Chikh 66', (yellow card) 68'	Report	Banel (yellow card) 13'; Chourak 39', (yellow card) 44'; Agougil (yellow card) 48'; Sarfo (yellow card) 90+3'	Stadium: Parkstad Limburg Stadion; Attendance: 8,312; Referee: Stan Teuben

6 November 2023 13	Jong Ajax	1−0	Willem II	Duivendrecht
20:00 CET	Idumbo Muzambo 9'; Brandes (yellow card) 31'; Banel (yellow card) 51'; Gooijer (yellow card) 83'; Salah-Eddine (yellow card) 90'	Report		Stadium: Sportpark De Toekomst; Attendance: 946; Referee: Nick Smit

10 November 2023 14	NAC Breda	1−1	Jong Ajax	Breda
20:00 CET	Leemans (yellow card) 26'; Koscelník (yellow card) 56'; Kemper (yellow card) 59' (yellow-red card) 90+7'; Omgba 68'; Garbett (yellow card) 80'; Vet (yellow card) 90+6'	Report	Godts 23', (yellow card) 37'; Verschuren (yellow card) 90+7'	Stadium: Rat Verlegh Stadion; Attendance: 17,954; Referee: Wouter Wiersma

24 November 2023 16	Jong Ajax	1−0	TOP Oss	Duivendrecht
20:00 CET	Godts 24'; Sarfo (yellow card) 90+4'	Report		Stadium: Sportpark De Toekomst; Attendance: 460; Referee: Robin Vereijken

27 November 2023 15	Jong Ajax	4−1	Helmond Sport	Duivendrecht
20:00 CET	Banel 47', 90+2'; Godts 59'; Idumbo Muzambo 89'	Report	Godts 21' (o.g.); Kreekels (yellow card) 29' (yellow-red card) 31'; Van Den Eynden (yellow card) 37'	Stadium: Sportpark De Toekomst; Attendance: 352; Referee: Michael Eijgelsheim

1 December 2023 17	FC Den Bosch	3−3	Jong Ajax	's-Hertogenbosch
20:00 CET	Kostorz 4', 9'; Mulders 39', (yellow card) 90+8'; Roggeveen (yellow card) 79'	Report	Gooijer 12', 83'; Godts (yellow card) 31', (goal) 88' (pen.); Banel (yellow card) 77'; Janse (yellow card) 90+7'	Stadium: De Vliert; Attendance: 4,812; Referee: Martijn Vos

11 December 2023 18	Jong Ajax	2−1	Jong FC Utrecht	Duivendrecht
20:00 CET	Kalokoh 41'; Idumbo Muzambo 61'; Henry (yellow card) 90'	Report	Kooy 38'; Iqbal (yellow card) 43'; Leliendal (yellow card) 45'; Augustinus-Jensen (yellow card) 51'	Stadium: Sportpark De Toekomst; Attendance: 572; Referee: Jesse Rozendal

15 December 2023 19	Jong PSV	2−2	Jong Ajax	Eindhoven
20:00 CET	Babadi 21' (pen.); El Meliani (yellow card) 32'; Nassoh 67'	Report	Aertssen (yellow card) 72'; Chourak (yellow card) 78', (goal) 83'; Janse 81', (yellow card) 90'	Stadium: De Herdgang; Attendance: 834; Referee: Thomas Hardeman

23 December 2023 20	FC Eindhoven	2−2	Jong Ajax	Eindhoven
21:00 CET	Dorenbosch 12', (yellow card) 60'; Kökcü 69'; Rêgo (yellow card) 90+5'	Report	Sarfo 4'; Misehouy 56'	Stadium: Jan Louwers Stadion; Attendance: 2,799; Referee: Luuk Timmer

19 January 2024 22	Willem II	1−1	Jong Ajax	Tilburg
20:00 CET	Meerveld 6', (yellow card) 35'; De Leeuw (yellow card) 61'	Report	Misehouy 14'; Sarfo (yellow card) 21'; Chourak (yellow card) 56'; Henry (yellow card) 73'	Stadium: Koning Willem II Stadion; Attendance: 13,860; Referee: Jesse Rozendal

22 January 2024 21	Jong Ajax	0−1	FC Groningen	Duivendrecht
20:00 CET	Kalokoh (yellow card) 60'; Verschuren (yellow card) 90+2'	Report	Van Bergen 17'	Stadium: Sportpark De Toekomst; Attendance: 962; Referee: Thomas Hardeman

29 January 2024 23	Jong Ajax	2−2	FC Dordrecht	Duivendrecht
20:00 CET	Banel 15'; Brandes 21'; Gaaei (yellow card) 31'; Fitz-Jim (yellow card) 79'	Report	Suray 6'; Bronkhorst (yellow card) 48', (goal) 58'; Tsoungui (yellow card) 39' (yellow-red card) 69'; Santoni (yellow card) 74' (yellow-red card) 74'	Stadium: Sportpark De Toekomst; Attendance: 598; Referee: Nick Smit

5 February 2024 24	Jong FC Utrecht	0−1	Jong Ajax	Utrecht
20:00 CET	Van de Haar (yellow card) 50'; Van Hees (yellow card) 78'; Andersen (yellow card) 90+2'	Report	Banel 35'; Kaplan (yellow card) 90+2'	Stadium: Sportcomplex Zoudenbalch; Attendance: 371; Referee: Boyd van Kommer

12 February 2024 25	Jong Ajax	3−0	MVV Maastricht	Duivendrecht
20:00 CET	Rijkhoff 18', 31'; Chourak 65'	Report		Stadium: Sportpark De Toekomst; Attendance: 589; Referee: Kevin Puts

16 February 2024 26	TOP Oss	2−1	Jong Ajax	Oss
20:00 CET	Allemeersch 25', 45+2'	Report	Aertssen (yellow card) 24'; Rijkhoff 51'; Verschuren (yellow card) 65'; Brandes (yellow card) 90+3'	Stadium: Frans Heesen Stadion; Attendance: 1,887; Referee: Massimiliano Ledda

26 February 2024 27	Jong Ajax	0−3	SC Telstar	Duivendrecht
20:00 CET		Report	Gravenberch 14' (pen.); Van de Loo 24'; Plat (yellow card) 67'; El Kachati 80'	Stadium: Sportpark De Toekomst; Attendance: 820; Referee: Luuk Timmer

1 March 2024 28	ADO Den Haag	2−1	Jong Ajax	The Hague
20:00 CET	Derijck 41'; Sürmeli (yellow card) 48'; Schalk 61'; Vigen (yellow card) 81'	Report	Fitz-Jim 25'; Vos (yellow card) 48'; Martha (yellow card) 63'	Stadium: Bingoal Stadion; Attendance: 8,674; Referee: Martin Pérez

8 March 2024 29	Jong Ajax	0−1	NAC Breda	Duivendrecht
20:00 CET	Martha (yellow card) 27'; Kalokoh (yellow card) 57'	Report	Royo (yellow card) 52'; Ómarsson 58'; Staring (yellow card) 90+6'	Stadium: Sportpark De Toekomst; Attendance: 842; Referee: Wouter Wiersma

11 March 2024 31	De Graafschap	0−2	Jong Ajax	Doetinchem
20:00 CET		Report	Agougil (yellow card) 32'; Banel 62', (yellow card) 74'; Chahid (yellow card) 90+7'; Chourak 90+8'	Stadium: De Vijverberg; Attendance: 9,823; Referee: Kevin Puts

15 March 2024 30	Jong Ajax	3−0	Jong PSV	Duivendrecht
20:00 CET	Kalokoh 19'; Rijkhoff 28', 47'	Report	Land (yellow card) 45+1'; Nassoh (yellow card) 78'	Stadium: Sportpark De Toekomst; Attendance: 873; Referee: Boyd van Kommer

29 March 2024 32	FC Emmen	4−2	Jong Ajax	Emmen
20:00 CET	Ubbink 55'; Bernadou 59'; Smeets 70'; Pouwels 79'; Vos (yellow card) 84'	Report	Agougil 34', 62', (yellow card) 38'	Stadium: De Oude Meerdijk; Attendance: 7,853; Referee: Martijn Vos

8 April 2024 33	Jong Ajax	0−2	FC Den Bosch	Duivendrecht
20:00 CEST	Vos (yellow card) 45'; Banel (yellow card) 72'	Report	Kostorz 40', 62'; Vicario (yellow card) 74'	Stadium: Sportpark De Toekomst; Attendance: 559; Referee: Thomas Hardeman

15 April 2024 34	Jong Ajax	2−1	SC Cambuur	Duivendrecht
20:00 CEST	Forbs 76'; Rijkhoff (yellow card) 80'	Report	Tol (yellow card) 18'; Balk 90+3'	Stadium: Sportpark De Toekomst; Attendance: 595; Referee: Robin Vereijken

19 April 2024 35	Helmond Sport	3−1	Jong Ajax	Helmond
20:00 CEST	Van den Hurk 31', 42'; Krätschmer (yellow card) 50', (goal) 65'	Report	Gooijer 82'	Stadium: GS Staalwerken Stadion; Attendance: 2,205; Referee: Boyd van Kommer

26 April 2024 36	Jong Ajax	1−1	Roda JC Kerkrade	Duivendrecht
20:00 CEST	Vos 13'	Report	Sejk 9'; Ouaissa (yellow card) 63'	Stadium: Sportpark De Toekomst; Attendance: 863; Referee: Martin Pérez

3 May 2024 37	VVV-Venlo	2−0	Jong Ajax	Venlo
20:00 CEST	Rutten (yellow card) 44'; Verschuren 73' (o.g.); Doesburg 81'	Report	Henry (yellow card) 84'; Martha (yellow card) 90+3'	Stadium: De Koel; Attendance: 6,675; Referee: Kevin Puts

10 May 2024 38	Jong Ajax	1−4	Jong AZ Alkmaar	Duivendrecht
20:00 CEST	Banel 70'	Report	Van Aken (yellow card) 27', (goal) 51'; Stam 32'; Kewal 43'; Reverson 82'	Stadium: Sportpark De Toekomst; Attendance: 1,123; Referee: Nick Smit

== Statistics ==
=== Appearances and goals ===
No.	Pos.	Nat	Name	Total		Eerste Divisie		Discipline		
No.	Pos.	Nat	Name	Apps	Goals	Apps	Goals	Yellow card	Second yellow card	Red card
	GK	(Netherlands) NED	Tom de Graaff	15	0	15	0	0	0	0
	GK	(Netherlands) NED	Sten Kremers	1	0	1	0	0	0	0
	GK	(England) ENG	Charlie Setford	19	0	19	0	0	0	0
	DF	(Netherlands) NED	Olivier Aertssen	23	0	23	0	3	0	0
	DF	(Netherlands) NED	Oualid Agougil	30	2	20+10	2	5	0	0
	DF	(Belgium) BEL	Ethan Butera	0	0	0	0	0	0	0
	DF	(Netherlands) NED	Tristan Gooijer	21	3	21	3	4	0	0
	DF	(Morocco) MAR	Diyae Jermoumi	10	0	8+2	0	0	0	0
	DF	(Serbia) SRB	Mateja Milovanović	0	0	0	0	0	0	0
	MF	(Netherlands) NED	Julian Brandes	34	2	28+6	2	2	0	0
	MF	(Morocco) MAR	Rida Chahid	17	1	7+10	1	0	0	0
	MF	(Netherlands) NED	Nassef Chourak	33	4	18+15	4	5	0	0
	MF	(Netherlands) NED	Gabriel Misehouy	13	6	11+2	6	0	0	0
	FW	(Netherlands) NED	Jaydon Banel	36	7	36	7	5	0	0
	FW	(Netherlands) NED	Yoram Boerhout	8	0	5+3	0	0	0	0
	FW	(Belgium) BEL	Mika Godts	14	6	12+2	6	4	0	0
	FW	(Netherlands) NED	David Kalokoh	31	3	23+8	3	2	0	0
	FW	(Netherlands) NED	Ar'jany Martha	23	0	21+2	0	4	0	0
	FW	(Netherlands) NED	Raphaël Sarfo	29	1	13+16	1	3	0	0
First team players who have made appearances for reserve squad:
	GK	(Germany) GER	Diant Ramaj	2	0	2	0	0	0	0
	GK	(Argentina) ARG	Gerónimo Rulli	1	0	1	0	0	0	0
	DF	(Argentina) ARG	Gastón Ávila	1	0	1	0	0	0	0
	DF	(Denmark) DEN	Anton Gaaei	8	0	8	0	1	0	0
	DF	(Turkey) TUR	Ahmetcan Kaplan	11	0	10+1	0	1	0	0
	DF	(Netherlands) NED	Anass Salah-Eddine	10	1	10	1	2	0	0
	MF	(Netherlands) NED	Kian Fitz-Jim	18	1	18	1	1	0	0
	MF	(Iceland) ISL	Kristian Hlynsson	7	3	7	3	1	0	0
	MF	(Norway) NOR	Sivert Mannsverk	3	0	2+1	0	0	0	0
	MF	(Netherlands) NED	Silvano Vos	20	1	20	1	3	0	0
	FW	(Netherlands) NED	Amourricho van Axel Dongen	5	0	2+3	0	0	0	0
	FW	(Portugal) POR	Carlos Forbs	2	1	2	1	0	0	0
	FW	(Netherlands) NED	Julian Rijkhoff	13	6	13	6	0	0	0
Youth players who have made appearances for reserve squad:
	DF	(Netherlands) NED	Aaron Bouwman	1	0	0+1	0	0	0	0
	DF	(Netherlands) NED	Alvaro Henry	10	0	2+8	0	3	0	0
	DF	(Netherlands) NED	Dies Janse	12	1	4+8	1	2	0	0
	DF	(Netherlands) NED	Precious Ugwu	4	0	1+3	0	0	0	0
	DF	(Netherlands) NED	Nick Verschuren	16	0	9+7	0	4	0	0
	MF	(Netherlands) NED	Gerlad Alders	16	0	3+13	0	0	0	0
	MF	(Netherlands) NED	Avery Appiah	2	0	0+2	0	0	0	0
	MF	(Netherlands) NED	Olaf Gorter	21	0	7+14	0	0	0	0
	MF	(Netherlands) NED	Luca Messori	1	0	0+1	0	0	0	0
	MF	(Netherlands) NED	Don O'Niel	1	0	0+1	0	0	0	0
	MF	(Netherlands) NED	Rico Speksnijder	19	0	2+17	0	0	0	0
	MF	(Netherlands) NED	Sean Steur	1	0	0+1	0	0	0	0
	FW	(Netherlands) NED	Shedrach Ebite	1	0	0+1	0	0	0	0
	FW	(Netherlands) NED	Emre Ünüvar	1	0	0+1	0	0	0	0
	FW	(Netherlands) NED	Skye Vink	9	0	2+7	0	0	0	0
	FW	(Netherlands) NED	Kayden Wolff	6	0	1+5	0	0	0	0
Players sold or loaned out after the start of the season:
	MF	(Belgium) BEL	Stanis Idumbo Muzambo	11	3	8+3	3	0	0	0
	FW	(Denmark) DEN	Christian Rasmussen	2	1	2	1	0	0	0

Last updated: 10 May 2024
Source: Competitions

=== Clean sheets ===
Rank	Pos	Nat	Name	Eerste Divisie	Matches
1	GK	(England)	Charlie Setford	4	19
2	GK	(Netherlands)	Tom de Graaff	2	15
3	GK	(Germany)	Diant Ramaj	1	2
4	GK	(Argentina)	Gerónimo Rulli	1	1
5	GK	(Netherlands)	Sten Kremers	0	1
Totals				8	38

Last updated: 10 May 2024
