= Faberski =

Faberski (feminine: Faberska; plural: Faberscy) is a Polish surname. Notable people with the surname include:

- Franciszek Faberski (1716–1800), Polish mayor of Kielce
- Jan Faberski (born 2006), Polish footballer
