= Olaf Gorter =

Dutch footballer (born 2005)

Personal information
- Full name: Olaf Gooitzen Paul Gorter
- Date of birth: 31 January 2005 (age 21)
- Place of birth: Amsterdam, Netherlands
- Height: 1.81 m (5 ft 11 in)
- Position: Midfielder

Team information
- Current team: Lecce
- Number: 28

Youth career
- 2008–2014: JSSL Singapore
- 2014–2017: Northern Tigers
- 2017–2018: BFC Bussum
- 2018–2024: Ajax
- 2024–2025: Lecce

Senior career*
| Years | Team | Apps | (Gls) |
| 2023–2024 | Jong Ajax | 21 | (0) |
| 2025– | Lecce | 3 | (1) |
- * Club domestic league appearances and goals as of 07:16, 24 August 2026 (UTC)

Olaf Gooitzen Paul Gorter (born 31 January 2005) is a Dutch professional footballer who plays as a midfielder for Serie A club Lecce.

== Club career ==
Gorter was born in the Netherlands, and moved to Singapore as an infant due to his father's job. He began playing football with the Singaporean academy JSSL Singapore at the age of 4, before moving to Australia with his family where he played for Northern Tigers. He played with BFC Bussum upon his return to the Netherlands, and was then scouted by the Ajax youth academy. In 2023, he started playing for Jong Ajax in the Eerste Divisie. On 10 July 2024, he moved to the Italian club Lecce, where he was assigned to their U20s. On 23 September 2025, he debuted with Lecce in a 3–0 Coppa Italia loss to AC Milan.
