= List of Dutch football transfers winter 2023–24 =

This is a list of Dutch football transfers for the 2023–24 winter transfer window. Only transfers featuring Eredivisie are listed.

== Eredivisie ==
Note: Flags indicate national team as has been defined under FIFA eligibility rules. Players may hold more than one non-FIFA nationality.

=== Ajax ===
In:

No.	Pos.	Nation	Player
6	MF	(England) ENG	Jordan Henderson (from (Saudi Arabia) Al-Ettifaq)
19	FW	(Netherlands) NED	Julian Rijkhoff (from (Germany) Borussia Dortmund II)

Out:

No.	Pos.	Nation	Player
17	DF	(Netherlands) NED	Anass Salah-Eddine (to Twente)
19	FW	(Georgia (country)) GEO	Georges Mikautadze (on loan to (France) Metz)

=== Almere City ===
In:

No.	Pos.	Nation	Player
7	FW	(Netherlands) NED	Jason van Duiven (on loan from PSV)
16	MF	(Bosnia and Herzegovina) BIH	Adi Nalić (free agent)

Out:

No.	Pos.	Nation	Player
10	MF	(Netherlands) NED	Lance Duijvestijn (to Excelsior)
23	DF	(Spain) ESP	Manel Royo (to NAC Breda)
29	FW	(Netherlands) NED	Bradley van Hoeven (to Emmen)

=== AZ ===
In:

No.	Pos.	Nation	Player
14	MF	(Serbia) SRB	Kristijan Belić (from (Serbia) Partizan)
27	DF	(Portugal) POR	Gonçalo Esteves (on loan from (Portugal) Sporting CP)
28	FW	(Netherlands) NED	Lequincio Zeefuik (from Volendam)

Out:

No.	Pos.	Nation	Player
7	FW	(Denmark) DEN	Jens Odgaard (on loan to (Italy) Bologna)
14	MF	(United States) USA	Djordje Mihailovic (to (United States) Colorado Rapids)
28	MF	(Netherlands) NED	Kenzo Goudmijn (on loan to Excelsior)
29	FW	(Netherlands) NED	Mexx Meerdink (on loan to Vitesse)

=== Excelsior ===
In:

No.	Pos.	Nation	Player
10	MF	(Netherlands) NED	Kenzo Goudmijn (on loan from AZ)
23	MF	(Netherlands) NED	Lance Duijvestijn (from Almere City)

Out:

No.	Pos.	Nation	Player
10	MF	(Netherlands) NED	Kian Fitz-Jim (loan return to Ajax)
19	FW	(Netherlands) NED	Nikolas Agrafiotis (to (Germany) Wehen Wiesbaden)
25	MF	(Germany) GER	Adrian Fein (to (Germany) SC Verl)

=== Feyenoord ===
In:

No.	Pos.	Nation	Player

Out:

No.	Pos.	Nation	Player
11	FW	(Netherlands) NED	Javairô Dilrosun (to (Mexico) América)

=== Fortuna Sittard ===
In:

No.	Pos.	Nation	Player
8	FW	(Sweden) SWE	Kristoffer Peterson (from (Israel) Hapoel Be'er Sheva)
21	MF	(Netherlands) NED	Justin Lonwijk (on loan from (Ukraine) Dynamo Kyiv, previously on loan at (Belgium) Anderlecht)
23	MF	(Cape Verde) CPV	Alessio Da Cruz (from (Italy) Feralpisalò)
27	FW	(Netherlands) NED	Jayden Braaf (on loan from (Italy) Hellas Verona)

Out:

No.	Pos.	Nation	Player
31	GK	(Croatia) CRO	Ivor Pandur (to (England) Hull City)
39	FW	(Belgium) BEL	Milan Robberechts (on loan to VVV-Venlo)
77	FW	(Netherlands) NED	Tijjani Noslin (to (Italy) Hellas Verona)
—	FW	(Portugal) POR	Umaro Embaló (on loan to (Portugal) Rio Ave, previously on loan at (Spain) Cartagena)

=== Go Ahead Eagles ===
In:

No.	Pos.	Nation	Player
7	FW	(Denmark) DEN	Søren Tengstedt (from (Denmark) Silkeborg)

Out:

No.	Pos.	Nation	Player
7	FW	(Netherlands) NED	Rashaan Fernandes (on loan to (Portugal) Leiria)
9	FW	(Netherlands) NED	Sylla Sow (to NEC)
14	DF	(Armenia) ARM	Aventis Aventisian (on loan to (Croatia) Jarun)
17	FW	(Spain) ESP	Dario Serra (on loan to (Spain) Mérida)

=== Heerenveen ===
In:

No.	Pos.	Nation	Player
10	FW	(Cyprus) CYP	Loizos Loizou (on loan from (Cyprus) Omonia)
25	DF	(Indonesia) IDN	Nathan Tjoe-A-On (on loan from (England) Swansea City)

Out:

No.	Pos.	Nation	Player

=== Heracles Almelo ===
In:

No.	Pos.	Nation	Player
5	MF	(Netherlands) NED	Jordy Bruijn (from (Lebanon) Safa)
20	MF	(Australia) AUS	Ajdin Hrustić (on loan from (Italy) Hellas Verona)
22	DF	(Norway) NOR	Fredrik Oppegård (on loan from PSV)
27	DF	(Suriname) SUR	Kelvin Leerdam (free agent)

Out:

No.	Pos.	Nation	Player
9	FW	(Italy) ITA	Antonio Satriano (on loan to (Italy) Trento)
10	MF	(Morocco) MAR	Anas Ouahim (on loan to (Moldova) Sheriff Tiraspol)
24	MF	(Germany) GER	Abdenego Nankishi (loan return to (Germany) Werder Bremen)
27	MF	(Turkey) TUR	Melih İbrahimoğlu (to (Albania) Egnatia)

=== NEC ===
In:

No.	Pos.	Nation	Player
9	MF	(Suriname) SUR	Tjaronn Chery (on loan from (Israel) Maccabi Haifa)
19	FW	(Netherlands) NED	Sylla Sow (from Go Ahead Eagles)
27	MF	(Luxembourg) LUX	Yvandro Borges Sanches (on loan from (Germany) Borussia Mönchengladbach)
—	MF	(Netherlands) NED	Sami Ouaissa (from Roda JC)

Out:

No.	Pos.	Nation	Player
7	FW	(Netherlands) NED	Elayis Tavşan (to (Italy) Hellas Verona)
8	MF	(Denmark) DEN	Magnus Mattsson (to (Denmark) Copenhagen)
15	DF	(Japan) JPN	Sai van Wermeskerken (to (Japan) Kawasaki Frontale)
25	FW	(France) FRA	Alexis Tibidi (loan return to (France) Troyes)
33	FW	(Turkey) TUR	Selim Can Sönmez (on loan to TOP Oss)
35	DF	(Netherlands) NED	Luc Netten (to Feyenoord U21)
—	MF	(Netherlands) NED	Sami Ouaissa (on loan to Roda JC)

=== PEC Zwolle ===
In:

No.	Pos.	Nation	Player
8	FW	(Netherlands) NED	Silvester van der Water (on loan from Cambuur)
22	FW	(Netherlands) NED	Kaj de Rooij (free agent)
50	MF	(Bulgaria) BUL	Filip Krastev (on loan from (Belgium) Lommel)

Out:

No.	Pos.	Nation	Player
3	DF	(Germany) GER	Luis Görlich (to (Norway) Bryne)
8	MF	(Netherlands) NED	Dean Huiberts (on loan to (Belgium) Beerschot)
19	FW	(Spain) ESP	Nico Serrano (loan return to (Spain) Athletic Bilbao)

=== PSV ===
In:

No.	Pos.	Nation	Player

Out:

No.	Pos.	Nation	Player
19	FW	(Netherlands) NED	Jason van Duiven (on loan to Almere City)
32	FW	(Belgium) BEL	Yorbe Vertessen (to (Germany) Union Berlin)
35	DF	(Norway) NOR	Fredrik Oppegård (on loan to Heracles Almelo)
—	FW	(Argentina) ARG	Maximiliano Romero (to (Argentina) Racing Club, previously on loan)

=== RKC Waalwijk ===
In:

No.	Pos.	Nation	Player
20	FW	(Netherlands) NED	Mats Seuntjens (from Utrecht)

Out:

No.	Pos.	Nation	Player
22	DF	(Israel) ISR	Raz Meir (to (Israel) Hapoel Tel Aviv)

=== Sparta Rotterdam ===
In:

No.	Pos.	Nation	Player
—	MF	(Japan) JPN	Shunsuke Mito (from (Japan) Albirex Niigata)

Out:

No.	Pos.	Nation	Player
—	MF	(Spain) ESP	Pedro Alemañ (to (Spain) Valencia Mestalla)
—	FW	(United States) USA	Agustin Anello (on loan to Cambuur)
—	GK	(Netherlands) NED	Delano van Crooij (on loan to VVV-Venlo)

=== Twente ===
In:

No.	Pos.	Nation	Player
21	FW	(Netherlands) NED	Myron Boadu (on loan from (France) Monaco)
34	DF	(Netherlands) NED	Anass Salah-Eddine (from Ajax)

Out:

No.	Pos.	Nation	Player
27	FW	(Costa Rica) CRC	Manfred Ugalde (to (Russia) Spartak Moscow)

=== Utrecht ===
In:

No.	Pos.	Nation	Player
9	FW	(Netherlands) NED	Sam Lammers (on loan from (Scotland) Rangers)
17	FW	(Denmark) DEN	Jeppe Okkels (from (Sweden) Elfsborg)
23	DF	(Denmark) DEN	Niklas Vesterlund (from (Norway) Tromsø)
29	DF	(Germany) GER	Tim Handwerker (on loan from (Germany) 1. FC Nürnberg)
32	GK	(Netherlands) NED	Thijmen Nijhuis (free agent)

Out:

No.	Pos.	Nation	Player
20	MF	(Morocco) MAR	Zakaria Labyad (to (China) Yunnan Yukun)
21	FW	(Netherlands) NED	Mats Seuntjens (to RKC Waalwijk)
22	DF	(Spain) ESP	Hugo Novoa (loan return to (Germany) RB Leipzig)
23	MF	(Netherlands) NED	Bart Ramselaar (to (Singapore) Lion City Sailors)
27	DF	(France) FRA	Modibo Sagnan (to (France) Montpellier)
32	GK	(Netherlands) NED	Calvin Raatsie (on loan to Roda JC Kerkrade)

=== Vitesse ===
In:

No.	Pos.	Nation	Player
14	MF	(United States) USA	Paxten Aaronson (on loan from (Germany) Eintracht Frankfurt)
28	FW	(Algeria) ALG	Anis Hadj Moussa (on loan from (Belgium) Patro Eisden)
30	FW	(Romania) ROU	Adrian Mazilu (on loan from (England) Brighton)
35	FW	(Netherlands) NED	Mexx Meerdink (on loan from AZ)

Out:

No.	Pos.	Nation	Player
10	FW	(Bosnia and Herzegovina) BIH	Said Hamulić (loan return to (France) Toulouse)
42	FW	(Netherlands) NED	Million Manhoef (to (England) Stoke City)
—	FW	(Denmark) DEN	Nikolai Baden (to (Denmark) Lyngby, previously on loan at Austria Lustenau)

=== Volendam ===
In:

No.	Pos.	Nation	Player
9	FW	(Portugal) POR	Vivaldo Semedo (on loan from (Italy) Udinese)
30	MF	(Morocco) MAR	Safouane Karim (from Heerenveen U21)
50	DF	(France) FRA	Axel Guessand (on loan from (Italy) Udinese)

Out:

No.	Pos.	Nation	Player
19	FW	(Netherlands) NED	Koen Blommestijn (on loan to Quick Boys)
25	FW	(Netherlands) NED	Lequincio Zeefuik (to AZ)
30	MF	(Netherlands) NED	Flip Klomp (on loan to Koninklijke HFC)

== See also ==
- 2023–24 Eredivisie
