= Julian Brandes =

Dutch footballer (born 2004)

Personal information
- Full name: Julian Christiaan Brandes
- Date of birth: 11 May 2004 (age 22)
- Place of birth: Amsterdam, Netherlands
- Height: 1.77 m (5 ft 10 in)
- Position: Midfielder

Youth career
- 2008–2011: RODA '23
- 2011–2012: AFC
- 2012–2022: Ajax

Senior career*
Years	Team	Apps	(Gls)
2022–2025	Jong Ajax	63	(3)
2025–2026	Pescara	6	(0)

International career^{‡}
2019–2020	Netherlands U15	7	(0)
2020–2022	Netherlands U16	2	(1)
2022	Netherlands U18	2	(0)
- * Club domestic league appearances and goals as of 8 May 2026 ‡ National team caps and goals as of 28 March 2022

Julian Christiaan Brandes (born 11 May 2004) is a Dutch professional footballer who plays as a midfielder.

== Club career ==
Brandes entered the Ajax academy on 12 May 2012, his eighth birthday. Having progressed through each youth level, he was identified by club media as one of the more promising midfielders yet to sign senior terms. Ajax offered him a first professional contract on 12 May 2022, a three‑year agreement running to 30 June 2025 with an option for a further season.

Ahead of the 2022–23 campaign, Brandes trained with Ajax's first‑team squad during pre‑season under new head coach Alfred Schreuder, featuring in a series of non‑competitive friendlies. He began the season as an unused substitute for Jong Ajax and rejoined the match‑day squad in February 2023 after a spell out of contention. Brandes made his professional debut on 17 March 2023, starting at centre‑back in a 2–0 Eerste Divisie defeat to Almere City. He scored his first league goal on 18 September 2023, opening the scoring for Jong Ajax in a 5–2 loss to Jong AZ.

He departed Ajax upon the expiry of his contract at the end of the 2024–25 season.

On 20 August 2025, Brandes signed a one-year contract with Serie B side Pescara.

== Career statistics ==
As of match played 9 May 2025

Appearances and goals by club, season and competition
Club	Season		League		National Cup		Continental		Other		Total	
Club	Season	Division	Apps	Goals	Apps	Goals	Apps	Goals	Apps	Goals	Apps	Goals
Jong Ajax	2022–23	Eerste Divisie	4	0	-	-	-	-	-	-	4	0
Jong Ajax	2023–24	Eerste Divisie	34	2	-	-	-	-	-	-	34	2
Jong Ajax	2024–25	Eerste Divisie	25	1	-	-	-	-	-	-	25	1
Delfino Pescara 1936	2025–26	Serie B	0	0	0	0	–	–	–	–	0	0
Career total			63	3	0	0	0	0	0	0	63	3
