= Alvaro Henry =

Dutch footballer (born 2005)

Personal information
- Date of birth: 14 February 2005 (age 21)
- Place of birth: Amsterdam, Netherlands
- Height: 1.82 m (6 ft 0 in)
- Position: Defender

Team information
- Current team: TOP Oss
- Number: 12

Youth career
- 2014–2019: FC Utrecht
- 2019–2023: AFC Ajax

Senior career*
Years	Team	Apps	(Gls)
2023–2024	Jong Ajax	12	(0)
2024–2025	Lafnitz	14	(0)
2025–2026	Jong Sparta	28	(1)
2026–	TOP Oss	4	(0)

International career^{‡}
2020–2021	Netherlands U15	3	(0)
2021–2022	Netherlands U17	12	(0)
2022	Netherlands U18	1	(0)
Medal record
Men's football
Representing Netherlands
UEFA European Under-17 Championship
Runner-up	2022 Israel
- * Club domestic league appearances and goals as of 10 October 2026 ‡ National team caps and goals as of 00:15, 13 May 2023 (UTC)

Alvaro Henry (born 14 February 2005) is a Dutch footballer who plays as a defender for Eerste Divisie club TOP Oss.

== Career ==
Born in Amsterdam, Henry played as a child at Zuid-Oost United in Amsterdam until he was scouted by FC Utrecht at nine years-old. He played right wing before switching to right back and centre back.

=== Ajax ===
He left FC Utrecht to join AFC Ajax in 2019. He signed his first professional contract with the Amsterdam club in April 2021, agreeing a three-year deal until June 2024. Later that year he suffered a knee injury which kept him out for months and hampered his development. On 13 January 2023, Henry made his debut in the Eerste Divisie for Jong Ajax appearing as a second-half substitute against De Graafschap.

=== Lafnitz ===
He signed a two-year contract with Austrian side SV Lafnitz in July 2024. He made his debut for the club on 26 July 2024 as a starter in the Austrian Cup away against SC Weiz. He played for an hour as the match was drawn 3–3 with Lafnitz eventually going through after a penalty shoot-out. He made his debut for Lafnitz in the Austrian 2. Liga on 3 August 2024, starting the game but earning a red card for two bookable offences in a 0–0 away draw against Austria Lustenau.

== Style of play ==
Henry is capable of playing at right back and centre back.

== International career ==
In May 2022 Henry was selected for the Dutch U17 squad for the 2022 UEFA European Under-17 Championship held in Israel. Henry was a regular in the side as they reached the final, and appeared as a substitute in the final which they were on the losing side, 2–1 to France U17 on 1 June 2022.

== Career statistics ==
As of match played 3 May 2024

Appearances and goals by club, season and competition
Club	Season	League			Cup		Other		Total	
Club	Season	Division	Apps	Goals	Apps	Goals	Apps	Goals	Apps	Goals
Jong Ajax	2022–23	Eerste Divisie	2	0	—		—		2	0
Jong Ajax	2023–24	Eerste Divisie	9	0	—		—		9	0
Career total			11	0	0	0	0	0	11	0
