= Rida Chahid =

Moroccan footballer (born 2004)

Personal information
- Full name: Mohamed Rida Chahid
- Date of birth: 3 December 2004 (age 21)
- Place of birth: Purmerend, Netherlands
- Height: 1.82 m (6 ft 0 in)
- Position: Midfielder

Youth career
- 2014–2022: Ajax

Senior career*
Years	Team	Apps	(Gls)
2022–2025	Jong Ajax	33	(1)
- * Club domestic league appearances and goals as of 16 May 2025

Mohamed Rida Chahid (born 3 December 2004) is a professional footballer who plays as a midfielder.

== Club career ==
From Purmerend, Chahid joined the Ajax youth academy in 2014. Chahid played for Ajax in the UEFA Youth League. He made his debut in professional football against SC Heracles on 19 May 2023 in the Eerste Divisie. He signed a new professional contract with Ajax in August 2023. That month, on 25 August 2023, he scored his goal in the Eerste Divisie, away against SC Cambuur.

He departed Ajax upon the expiry of his contract at the end of the 2024–25 season.

== International career ==
Chahid was called up to the Morocco U20 national team in 2021 ahead of the 2021 Arab Cup U-20.

== Career statistics ==
As of match played 12 August 2024

Appearances and goals by club, season and competition
Club	Season	League			Cup		Europe		Other		Total	
Club	Season	Division	Apps	Goals	Apps	Goals	Apps	Goals	Apps	Goals	Apps	Goals
Jong Ajax	2022–23	Eerste Divisie	1	0	—		—		—		1	0
Jong Ajax	2023–24	Eerste Divisie	17	1	—		—		—		17	1
Jong Ajax	2024–25	Eerste Divisie	15	0	—		—		—		15	0
Career total			33	1	0	0	0	0	0	0	33	1
