= Raphaël Sarfo =

Dutch association football player

Personal information
- Full name: Raphaël Boakye Sarfo
- Date of birth: 8 January 2004 (age 22)
- Place of birth: Amsterdam, Netherlands
- Height: 1.65 m (5 ft 5 in)
- Position: Forward

Youth career
- 2012–2022: AFC Ajax

Senior career*
Years	Team	Apps	(Gls)
2022–2024	Jong Ajax	30	(1)
2024–2026	Patro Eisden	22	(1)

International career^{‡}
2019	Netherlands U15	3	(0)
2019	Netherlands U16	4	(1)
- * Club domestic league appearances and goals as of 20 April 2026 ‡ National team caps and goals as of 11 February 2020

Raphaël Sarfo (born 8 January 2004) is a Dutch professional footballer.

== Career ==
From Amsterdam, Sarfo has been playing in Ajax's youth academy since 2012. He made his debut in professional football for Jong Ajax against Heracles Almelo on September 5, 2022. In August 2023, he signed a one-year professional contract with the club, with the option of two more years.

In July 2024, Sarfo joined Belgian Challenger Pro League club Patro Eisden on a two-year contract.

== International career ==
Sarfo has represented the Netherlands at both the U-15 and U-16 age-group levels.

== Career statistics ==
As of match played 11 March 2024

Appearances and goals by club, season and competition
Club	Season	League			Cup		Europe		Other		Total	
Club	Season	Division	Apps	Goals	Apps	Goals	Apps	Goals	Apps	Goals	Apps	Goals
Jong Ajax Amsterdam	2022–23	Eerste Divisie	1	0	—		—		—		1	0
Jong Ajax Amsterdam	2023–24	Eerste Divisie	29	1	—		—		—		29	1
Career total			30	1	0	0	0	0	0	0	30	1

== Personal life ==
Although born in The Netherlands, Sarfo has Ghanaian heritage.
