= David Kalokoh =

Dutch association football player

Personal information
- Date of birth: 21 April 2005 (age 21)
- Place of birth: Sierra Leone
- Height: 1.86 m (6 ft 1 in)
- Position: Striker

Team information
- Current team: Jong Ajax
- Number: 56

Youth career
- VV Vos
- VVV Venlo
- AFC Ajax

Senior career*
Years	Team	Apps	(Gls)
2023–	Jong Ajax	66	(5)
2024–	Ajax	0	(0)

International career^{‡}
2020–2021	Netherlands U15	4	(1)
2021–2022	Netherlands U17	5	(1)
2022	Netherlands U18	3	(1)
2023	Netherlands U19	1	(0)
- * Club domestic league appearances and goals as of 28 April 2026 ‡ National team caps and goals as of 00,33, 12 September 2023 (UTC)

David Kalokoh (born 21 April 2005) is a professional footballer who plays as a striker for Jong Ajax of the Eerste Divisie. Born in Sierra Leone, he has represented the Netherlands at youth level.

== Career ==
Born in Sierra Leone, before moving to Venlo, where he played with VV Vos and spent six years with VVV Venlo. He moved to Amsterdam to train with AFC Ajax at 13 years-old. He signed a three-year professional contract with Ajax as a 15-year-old in March 2021. He featured for the Ajax youth team in the UEFA Youth League in 2022. He made his Eerste Divisie debut on 28 April 2023, away at his former club, VVV Venlo.

== Style of play ==
Kalokoh has been described as a left-footed winger.

== Personal life ==
Kalokoh was 1.86m tall by the age of 17 years-old.

== Career statistics ==
As of match played 12 August 2024

Appearances and goals by club, season and competition
Club	Season	League			Cup		Continental		Other		Total	
Club	Season	Division	Apps	Goals	Apps	Goals	Apps	Goals	Apps	Goals	Apps	Goals
Jong Ajax	2022–23	Eerste Divisie	2	0	—		—		—		2	0
Jong Ajax	2023–24	Eerste Divisie	31	3	—		—		—		31	3
Jong Ajax	2024–25	Eerste Divisie	1	0	—		—		—		1	0
Jong Ajax	Total		34	3	—		—		—		34	3
Ajax	2023–24	Eredivisie	0	0	—		0	0	—		0	0
Career total			34	3	0	0	0	0	0	0	34	3
