= Dave Vos =

Dutch football coach (born 1983)

Personal information
- Date of birth: 24 April 1983 (age 43)
- Place of birth: Amstelveen, Netherlands

Team information
- Current team: Porto (assistant)

Managerial career
- Years: Team
- 2005–2006: AZ (U17)
- 2011–2017: Ajax (youth)
- 2017–2020: Ajax (U17)
- 2021: Ajax (U18/U19)
- 2021–2022: Rangers (assistant)
- 2023–2024: Jong Ajax
- 2024–2025: Ajax (assistant)
- 2025–: Porto (assistant)

Dave Vos (born 24 April 1983) is a Dutch football manager who serves as assistant manager of the Primeira Liga club Porto.

== Career ==
Vos began his coaching career as a youth coach at AZ during the 2005–06 season before joining the KNVB in 2008, where he worked in the talent development program. While at the KNVB, he was recruited by Ajax as a youth coach. Over the years, he coached various academy teams and served as assistant coach to Mitchell van der Gaag at Jong Ajax in the 2020–21 season.

In 2021, Vos was appointed assistant manager of Giovanni van Bronckhorst at Scottish side Rangers.

Ajax reappointed Vos as interim head coach of Jong Ajax, replacing John Heitinga. He made his managerial debut on 20 February 2023, leading the team to a 4–2 victory over MVV at the Sportpark De Toekomst. Mika Godts made his debut in the match, scoring one of the final two goals alongside Jaydon Banel.

In June 2023, Ajax confirmed Vos as Jong Ajax head coach, extending his contract until mid-2025. In June 2024, he was promoted to assistant coach of the first team under Francesco Farioli.
