= Nassef Chourak =

Dutch association football player

Personal information
- Date of birth: 21 July 2004 (age 22)
- Place of birth: Woerden, Netherlands
- Height: 1.85 m (6 ft 1 in)
- Position: Midfielder

Team information
- Current team: Kalmar FF
- Number: 6

Youth career
- –2014: Alphense Boys
- 2014–2015: Sparta Rotterdam
- 2015–2016: Alexandria '66
- 2016–2018: ADO Den Haag
- 2018–2023: Ajax

Senior career*
Years	Team	Apps	(Gls)
2023–2026	Jong Ajax	67	(8)
2026–	Kalmar FF	9	(0)

International career
2019	Netherlands U15	5	(0)
- * Club domestic league appearances and goals as of 24 May 2026

Nassef Chourak (born 21 July 2004) is a Dutch footballer who plays as a midfielder for Allsvenskan club Kalmar FF.

== Early life ==
Chourak hails from the South Holland region of the Netherlands. He is of Moroccan descent.

== Career ==
A sought-after youth player, Chourak featured in the academy teams of Sparta Rotterdam and ADO Den Haag and was involved in a tug-of-war between Feyenoord and AFC Ajax in 2022. A proposed move to Premier League side Chelsea reportedly fell through after British regulations changed after Britain left the EU.

In August 2023, he signed a one-year professional contract with AFC Ajax, with the option of two more years. That month, on 25 August 2023 he made his senior debut in the Eerste Divisie away against SC Cambuur. In August 2024, he signed a new three-year contract with Ajax.

In January 2026, Chourak left Ajax for Allsvenskan side Kalmar FF.

== International career ==
Chourak played 5 games for the Netherlands national under-15 football team.

== Career statistics ==
As of match played 19 August 2024

Appearances and goals by club, season and competition
Club	Season	League			Cup		Continental		Other		Total	
Club	Season	Division	Apps	Goals	Apps	Goals	Apps	Goals	Apps	Goals	Apps	Goals
Jong Ajax	2023–24	Eerste Divisie	33	4	—		—		—		33	4
Jong Ajax	2024–25	Eerste Divisie	2	0	—		—		—		2	0
Career total			35	4	0	0	0	0	0	0	35	4
