= List of Dutch football transfers winter 2024–25 =

This is a list of Dutch football transfers for the 2024–25 winter transfer window. Only transfers featuring Eredivisie are listed.

== Eredivisie ==
Note: Flags indicate national team as has been defined under FIFA eligibility rules. Players may hold more than one non-FIFA nationality.

=== PSV ===
In:

No.	Pos.	Nation	Player
3	DF	NED	Tyrell Malacia (on loan from (England) Manchester United)
19	FW	BIH	Esmir Bajraktarević (from (United States) New England Revolution)
27	FW	ESP	Lucas Pérez (free agent)

Out:

No.	Pos.	Nation	Player
27	FW	MEX	Hirving Lozano (to (United States) San Diego)
32	DF	BEL	Matteo Dams (to (Saudi Arabia) Al-Ahli)
35	DF	NOR	Fredrik Oppegård (to (France) Auxerre)

=== Feyenoord ===
In:

No.	Pos.	Nation	Player
7	MF	POL	Jakub Moder (from (England) Brighton & Hove Albion)
28	MF	MAR	Oussama Targhalline (from (France) Le Havre)
31	FW	MEX	Stephano Carrillo (from (Mexico) Santos Laguna)
39	GK	IRL	Liam Bossin (on loan from Dordrecht)

Out:

No.	Pos.	Nation	Player
24	MF	NED	Gjivai Zechiël (on loan to Sparta Rotterdam)
29	FW	MEX	Santiago Giménez (to (Italy) Milan)
—	FW	SWE	Patrik Wålemark (to (Poland) Lech Poznań, previously on loan)

=== Twente ===
In:

No.	Pos.	Nation	Player
8	MF	USA	Taylor Booth (from Utrecht)
32	MF	BEL	Arno Verschueren (from Sparta Rotterdam)
37	FW	TUR	Naci Ünüvar (from Ajax, previously on loan at (Spain) Espanyol)
47	DF	NED	Gerald Alders (on loan from Jong Ajax)

Out:

No.	Pos.	Nation	Player
6	MF	NED	Carel Eiting (on loan to Sparta Rotterdam)
7	FW	NED	Mitchell van Bergen (on loan to Sparta Rotterdam)
8	MF	NED	Youri Regeer (to Ajax)
16	GK	MAR	Issam El Maach (on loan to Roda JC)
34	DF	NED	Anass Salah-Eddine (to (Italy) Roma)
39	DF	NED	Mats Rots (on loan to Heracles Almelo)

=== AZ ===
In:

No.	Pos.	Nation	Player

Out:

No.	Pos.	Nation	Player
25	FW	NED	Lequincio Zeefuik (on loan to (Belgium) OH Leuven)
33	MF	NED	Dave Kwakman (on loan to Groningen)

=== Ajax ===
In:

No.	Pos.	Nation	Player
2	DF	BRA	Lucas Rosa (from (Spain) Valladolid)
16	GK	BRA	Matheus (on loan from (Portugal) Braga)
17	FW	NOR	Oliver Valaker Edvardsen (from Go Ahead Eagles)
44	MF	NED	Youri Regeer (from Twente)

Out:

No.	Pos.	Nation	Player
2	DF	NED	Devyne Rensch (to (Italy) Roma)
10	FW	ENG	Chuba Akpom (on loan to (France) Lille)
16	MF	NOR	Sivert Mannsverk (on loan to (Wales) Cardiff City)
30	DF	ARG	Gastón Ávila (on loan to (Brazil) Fortaleza)
33	MF	BIH	Benjamin Tahirović (to (Denmark) Brøndby)
38	MF	ISL	Kristian Hlynsson (on loan to Sparta Rotterdam)
40	GK	GER	Diant Ramaj (to (Germany) Borussia Dortmund)
—	FW	TUR	Naci Ünüvar (to Twente, previously on loan at (Spain) Espanyol)

=== NEC ===
In:

No.	Pos.	Nation	Player
30	FW	NED	Bryan Linssen (from (Japan) Urawa Red Diamonds)

Out:

No.	Pos.	Nation	Player
7	FW	ESP	Rober (on loan to (Spain) Racing Santander)

=== Utrecht ===
In:

No.	Pos.	Nation	Player
26	FW	NED	Miliano Jonathans (from Vitesse)
91	FW	CIV	Sébastien Haller (on loan from (Germany) Borussia Dortmund, previously on loan at (Spain) Leganés)

Out:

No.	Pos.	Nation	Player
10	MF	USA	Taylor Booth (to Twente)
46	MF	DEN	Silas Andersen (to (Sweden) Häcken)
77	FW	NED	Ole Romeny (to (England) Oxford United)

=== Sparta Rotterdam ===
In:

No.	Pos.	Nation	Player
—	DF	NED	Patrick van Aanholt (free agent)
—	MF	NED	Carel Eiting (on loan from Twente)
—	MF	ISL	Kristian Hlynsson (on loan from Ajax)
—	MF	NED	Gjivai Zechiël (on loan from Feyenoord)
—	FW	ISL	Nökkvi Þeyr Þórisson (on loan from (United States) St. Louis City)
—	FW	NED	Mitchell van Bergen (on loan from Twente)
—	FW	NED	Joel Ideho (from ADO Den Haag)

Out:

No.	Pos.	Nation	Player
—	DF	ESP	Sergi Rosanas (to (Spain) AE Prat)
—	DF	SUR	Djevencio van der Kust (on loan to (Belgium) Beerschot)
—	MF	BEL	Arno Verschueren (to Twente)
—	MF	BRA	Metinho (loan return to (France) Troyes)
—	MF	NED	Julian Baas (on loan to (Germany) Eintracht Braunschweig)
—	FW	CAN	Charles-Andreas Brym (to Almere City)
—	FW	ALG	Camiel Neghli (to (England) Millwall)
—	FW	BRA	Kayky (loan return to (England) Manchester City)
—	DF	NED	Tijs Velthuis (on loan to (Italy) Sassuolo, previously on loan at (Italy) Salernitana)

=== Go Ahead Eagles ===
In:

No.	Pos.	Nation	Player
11	FW	NOR	Oskar Sivertsen (from (Norway) Kristiansund)
14	FW	SWE	Oscar Pettersson (from (Sweden) Göteborg)

Out:

No.	Pos.	Nation	Player
11	FW	NED	Bobby Adekanye (to (Turkey) Amed)
23	FW	NOR	Oliver Valaker Edvardsen (to Ajax)
25	DF	NED	Jamal Amofa (to (Bulgaria) Botev Plovdiv)
28	DF	NED	Pim Saathof (on loan to (Norway) Kongsvinger)

=== Fortuna Sittard ===
In:

No.	Pos.	Nation	Player
19	FW	SRB	Bojan Radulović (on loan from (England) Huddersfield Town)
20	MF	FRA	Édouard Michut (free agent)
24	DF	NED	Daley Sinkgraven (from (Spain) Las Palmas)

Out:

No.	Pos.	Nation	Player
50	FW	CRO	Ante Erceg (to (Croatia) Gorica)
85	FW	POR	Umaro Embaló (on loan to (Portugal) Vitória Guimarães)

=== Heerenveen ===
In:

No.	Pos.	Nation	Player
3	DF	NED	Jordy de Wijs (on loan from (Germany) Fortuna Düsseldorf)
16	MF	SWE	Marcus Linday (from (Sweden) Västerås)
24	FW	SRB	Miloš Luković (on loan from (France) Strasbourg)
28	DF	BUL	Hristiyan Petrov (from (Bulgaria) CSKA Sofia)
30	MF	IRN	Alireza Jahanbakhsh (free agent)

Out:

No.	Pos.	Nation	Player
9	FW	NOR	Daniel Karlsbakk (to (Norway) Sarpsborg 08)
19	MF	SWE	Simon Olsson (to (Sweden) Elfsborg)
24	FW	IRQ	Danilo Al-Saed (on loan to (Sweden) AIK)

=== PEC Zwolle ===
In:

No.	Pos.	Nation	Player

Out:

No.	Pos.	Nation	Player
17	MF	USA	Anthony Fontana (to (United States) Colorado Springs Switchbacks)
37	MF	MAR	Mohamed Oukhattou (on loan to Jong Sparta)
77	MF	GHA	Braydon Manu (on loan to (Germany) VfL Osnabrück)

=== Almere City ===
In:

No.	Pos.	Nation	Player
12	FW	IRQ	Ali Jasim (on loan from (Italy) Como)
18	FW	CAN	Charles-Andreas Brym (from Sparta Rotterdam)
27	DF	LUX	Marvin Martins (from Austria Wien)

Out:

No.	Pos.	Nation	Player
27	FW	FRA	Logan Delaurier-Chaubet (on loan to (Slovenia) Celje)

=== Heracles Almelo ===
In:

No.	Pos.	Nation	Player
39	DF	NED	Mats Rots (on loan from Twente)

Out:

No.	Pos.	Nation	Player
10	MF	NED	Shiloh 't Zand (loan return to Feyenoord)
12	DF	NED	Ruben Roosken (to (England) Huddersfield Town)
—	FW	ITA	Antonio Satriano (on loan to (Italy) Renate, previously on loan at (Italy) Casertana)

=== RKC Waalwijk ===
In:

No.	Pos.	Nation	Player
16	GK	NED	Mark Spenkelink (free agent)
32	DF	NED	Redouan El Yaakoubi (free agent)

Out:

No.	Pos.	Nation	Player
10	MF	NED	Reuven Niemeijer (to De Graafschap)
15	MF	NED	Nouri El Harmazi (to (Lithuania) Banga Gargždai)

=== Willem II ===
In:

No.	Pos.	Nation	Player
19	FW	BEL	Youssuf Sylla (on loan from (Belgium) Charleroi)
77	MF	TUR	Dennis Kaygin (on loan from (Austria) Rapid Wien)

Out:

No.	Pos.	Nation	Player
20	DF	NED	Valentino Vermeulen (free agent)
35	FW	NED	Khaled Razak (on loan to Roda JC)
44	DF	NED	Niels van Berkel (on loan to VVV-Venlo)

=== Groningen ===
In:

No.	Pos.	Nation	Player
4	DF	SWE	Hjalmar Ekdal (on loan from (England) Burnley)
16	MF	NED	Dave Kwakman (on loan from AZ)
20	MF	NED	Mats Seuntjens (from (Spain) Castellón)

Out:

No.	Pos.	Nation	Player
4	MF	NED	Joey Pelupessy (to (Belgium) Lommel)
8	MF	NOR	Johan Hove (to (Sweden) AIK)
38	FW	NED	Kian Slor (free agent)
—	FW	SWE	Kristian Lien (on loan to (Norway) HamKam, previously on loan at (Norway) Kristiansund)
—	FW	SWE	Paulos Abraham (to (Sweden) Hammarby, previously on loan at (Sweden) Göteborg)

=== NAC Breda ===
In:

No.	Pos.	Nation	Player
29	FW	NED	Sydney van Hooijdonk (from (Italy) Cesena)
31	GK	GRE	Kostas Lamprou (free agent)
44	DF	BEL	Maxime Busi (on loan from (France) Reims)
55	FW	GHA	Kamal Sowah (from (Belgium) Club Brugge)

Out:

No.	Pos.	Nation	Player
3	DF	SVK	Martin Koscelník (to (Czech Republic) Slovácko)
19	FW	NED	Tom Boere (to (Spain) Terrassa)
21	DF	ESP	Manel Royo (to (Spain) Andorra)
49	GK	NED	Tein Troost (on loan to (Republic of Ireland) Cork City)

== See also ==
- 2024–25 Eredivisie
