= JSSL Singapore =

Singaporean youth soccer academy

- Founded: 2002
- Website: www.jssl-singapore7s.com

JSSL Singapore (or Junior Soccer School and League Singapore) is a privately owned youth soccer academy based in Singapore which runs regular league tournaments and also provides professional coaching for competitive pathway development. It is also known as the largest youth tournament in Asia.

As of 2025, JSSL managed 15 youth leagues categories with more than 450 teams and over 6,000 youth players and coaches across 15 countries. The academy was founded in 2002, and as of 2025, it is currently based at The Arena in Woodleigh Park, Singapore

== Location ==
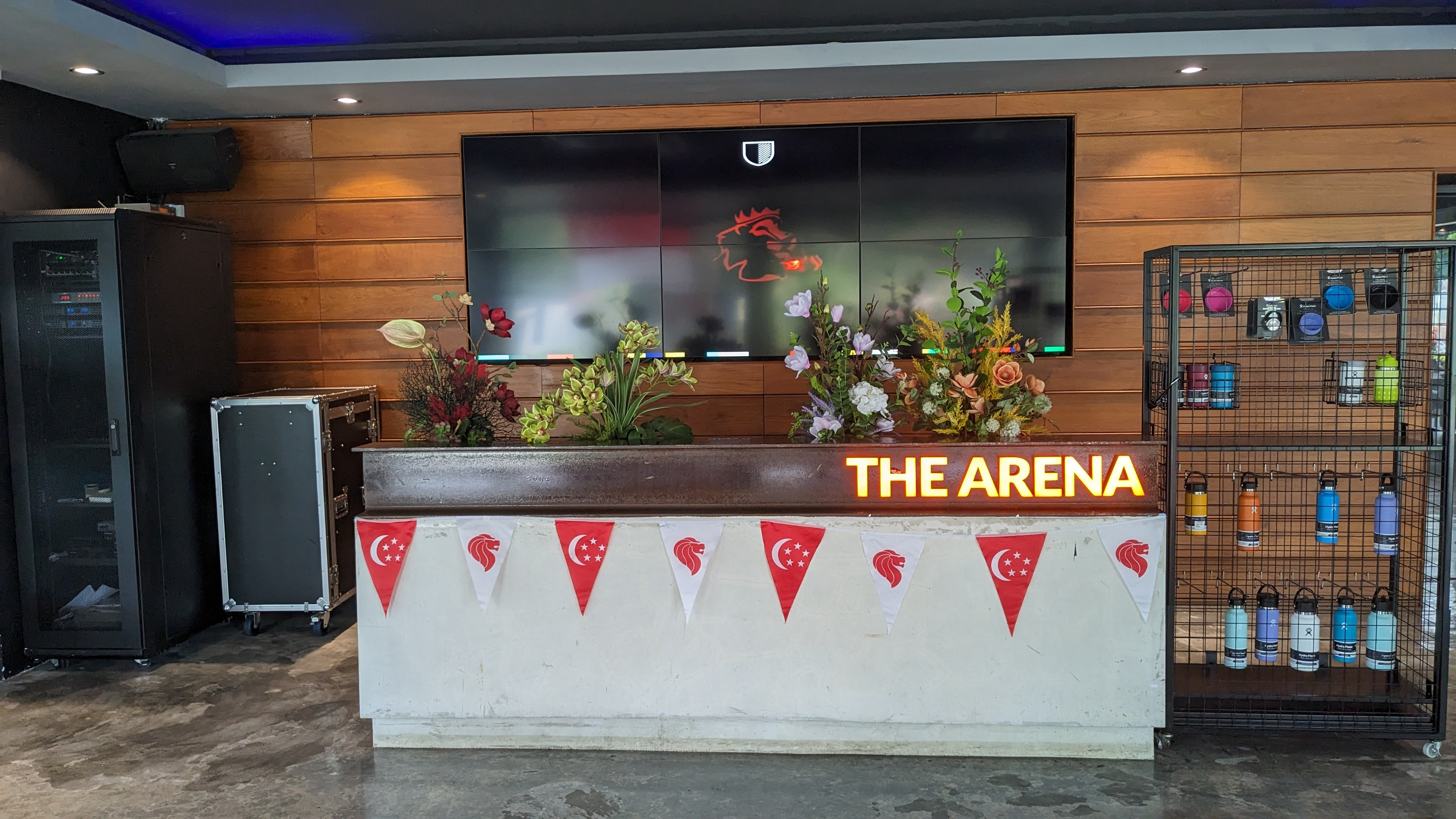
The Arena's reception counter

JSSL used to rent football pitches at the Home United Youth Football Academy in Mattar Road prior to 2017 for its footballing activities. Following complaints by residents living in the neighbourhood about noise levels, usage of the pitches were restricted. This resulted in JSSL's inability to use the pitches and it eventually relocated to The Arena in Woodleigh Park.

== Format ==
The tournament begins with a group stage. Teams are divided into groups of six or seven teams, where all teams play each other once. Following that, the top four placed teams of the group will qualify for the knockout stage, while the remaining teams in the group will qualify to the Plate knockout stages series. The tournament is played under all applicable FIFA rules. Each game is given 25 minutes with no half time.

Currently there are eleven boys categories each ranging from 6-years old until 16-years old and for girls there are four categories each ranging from 10-years old until 16-years old.

All fixtures and results will be updated immediately after the end of the game. Positions in the table will be updated according to all other results too. The automated system will also allow teams to know their knock-out game schedules and timings immediately after the group stage fixtures are done.

=== Tournament app ===
The official JSSL 7s Mobile App is available for all Apple and Android devices. Matches, schedules, results, tournament updates, videos, images, social media can all be accessed through the interactive JSSL 7s App.

== Management ==
JSSL Singapore is led by owner and managing director Harvey Davis, alongside general manager Gavin Lee and executive director Paul Parker, a former England and Manchester United defender. In addition, the academy contracts over 20 coaches across the various age divisions.

== Venue ==
With JSSL growing year by year, and more venues and fields to play on, waiting time is minimised. The main venue is located at and based at "The Arena" in Woodleigh Park.

Venue	Location
The Arena	Woodleigh Park
Mattar Training Centre (Sunday Only)	Mattar Road
Tampines SAFRA	Tampines Street 92
Singapore University of Technology and Design (SUTD)	Somapah Road
The Rainforest Sports Hub	West Coast Highway
Dempsey	Harding Road
Woodlands Stadium	Woodlands Street 13

Age categories
Categories	Venue	Categories	Venue
Boys		Boys	
Under 7 (Gold Package)	The Arena	Under 7 (Non-Gold Package)	Tampines SAFRA
Under 8 (Gold Package)	The Arena	Under 8 (Non-Gold Package)	Tampines SAFRA
Under 9 (Gold Package)	The Arena	Under 9 (Non-Gold Package)	Tampines SAFRA, Dempsey
Under 10 (Gold Package)	The Arena	Under 10 (Non-Gold Package)	Tampines SAFRA, Dempsey
Under 11 (Gold Package)	SUTD	Under 11 (Non-Gold Package)	The Rainforest Sports Hub, Dempsey
Under 12 (Gold Package)	SUTD	Under 12 (Non-Gold Package)	The Rainforest Sports Hub, Dempsey
Under 13 (Gold Package)	SUTD	Under 13 (Non-Gold Package)	Woodlands Stadium
Under 14 (Gold Package)	SUTD	Under 14 (Non-Gold Package)	Woodlands Stadium
Under 15 (Gold Package)	SUTD	Under 15 (Non-Gold Package)	Woodlands Stadium
Under 16 (Gold Package)	SUTD	Under 16 (Non-Gold Package)	Woodlands Stadium
Girls		Others	
Under 10	SUTD	Professional Academy U16s	The Arena
Under 14	The Arena	All Age-Group Finals	The Arena
Under 16	SUTD	All Age-Group Finals	The Arena

== Past champions ==
Under-16 Boys
Season	Champions	Score	Runner-ups	Manager	Venue	Guest of Honour
2017	(Portugal) Sporting CP	2–0	(Australia) Perth Glory	(Portugal) Luis Vicente Mateo	Padang	(England) Emile Heskey
2018	(Japan) Urawa Red Diamonds	3–0	(Australia) Perth Glory	(Japan) Takanari Sueto	Padang	(England) Teddy Sheringham (England) Paul Palker
2019	(England) Arsenal	2–0	(Australia) Perth Glory	(England) Dan Micciche	Our Tampines Hub	(Norway) John Arne Riise (England) Andy Cole
2020	Not held due to COVID-19 pandemic					
2021	Not held due to COVID-19 pandemic					
2022	(England) Tottenham Hotspurs	1–0	(Spain) Valencia	(Ivory Coast) Yaya Touré	Our Tampines Hub	(England) Michael Carrick
2023	(Spain) Valencia	1–0	(England) Tottenham Hotspurs	(Spain) Vicente Amposta	Our Tampines Hub	(Trinidad and Tobago) Dwight Yorke
2024	(Spain) Valencia (2)	4–0	(Australia) Melbourne City	(Spain) Vicente Amposta (2)	The Arena	(England) Danny Murphy
2025	(Spain) Valencia (3)	2–1	(England) Tottenham Hotspurs	(Spain) Vicente Amposta (3)	The Arena	(Norway) John Arne Riise

Under-16 Girls
Season	Champions
2019	(Spain) Atletico Madrid
2020	Not held due to COVID-19 pandemic
2021	Not held due to COVID-19 pandemic
2022	Not hosted
2023	(Spain) Valencia
2024	(Spain) Valencia (2)
2025	(Japan) Urawa Red Diamonds

== Collaboration ==
=== Sports ===
- (England) Fulham

In 2016, the media reported that JSSL Singapore and English club Fulham had started a partnership at the end of 2015 in which outstanding youth players in Singapore would be provided with the opportunity to train at the Fulham Academy for two weeks.

In 2017, JSSL Singapore invited Fulham FC's Under-15 team to participate in the JSSL Professional Academies Singapore International 7s, and fully funded their trip to Singapore to participate in the tournament. Later that year, it was announced that Benjamin James Davis, a young Thai footballer holding Singaporean citizenship and the son of JSSL's director, had signed a two-year scholarship at Fulham's academy after rising through the ranks at JSSL Singapore and the Football Association of Singapore's Junior Centre of Excellence.

- (England) Manchester City

In 2017, Felix Goddard, a German-born British youth who joined JSSL in 2013 at the age of 9, earned a spot at the Manchester City Academy.

- (Singapore) Tampines Rovers

In March 2018, JSSL and local Singapore Premier League club Tampines Rovers officially announced a partnership to create pathways for talented youth players for professional development. The agreement, initially set to last for three years until 2021, saw JSSL Singapore coordinate youth development programmes for Tampines Rovers and feed promising talents into the professional side's youth setup. In addition, JSSL Singapore also provided full scholarships to 60 local youth players between 6 and 14 years old to cover the costs of participation at the academy's programme for a year.

In 2022, JSSL and Tampines Rovers formed a JSSL Tampines Rovers women's team to compete in the Women's Premier League, starting from the 2023 season.

- (Spain) La Liga

LALIGA has a firm commitment with the development of Youth Football since 2021 in Singapore its collaboration agreement until 2026 for the national project "Unleash the Roar!", together with Sport Singapore and the Football Association of Singapore.

=== Commercial ===
As of 2025, JSSL collaborate with Hotelplanner which has appointed over 10 official hotels. All hotels will offer the best rates available with the Holiday Inn Atrium Singapore, the no 1 Official Hotel where all of the participating team will be staying. The official hotels provide a range of 3 star to 5 star across different price ranges to accommodate all the teams needs and price ranges.

==== Former partnership ====
- (Germany) Adidas
- (Germany) DHL
- (Turkey) Turkish Airlines
- (Singapore) Courts

== Notable player ==
- (Portugal) Hevertton Santos
- (Germany) Felix Goddard
- (Thailand) Ben Davies
- (England) Harvey Elliott
- (England) Omari Hutchinson
- (England) Callum Hudson-Odoi
- (England) Dominic Solanke
- (Sweden) Anthony Elanga
- (Ghana) Benjamin Tetteh
- (Spain) Jesús Vázquez
- (Spain) David Otorbi
- (Spain) Rubén Iranzo
