= Precious Ugwu =

Dutch footballer

Personal information
- Full name: Precious Joel Uche-Chukwu Ugwu
- Date of birth: 8 February 2006 (age 20)
- Place of birth: Filderstadt, Germany
- Height: 1.92 m (6 ft 4 in)
- Position: Centre-back

Team information
- Current team: Volendam
- Number: 5

Youth career
- 2014–2024: Ajax

Senior career*
Years	Team	Apps	(Gls)
2024–2025	Jong Ajax	32	(1)
2025–	Volendam	45	(1)

International career^{‡}
2023	Netherlands U17	2	(0)
2023–2024	Netherlands U18	7	(1)
2024–2025	Netherlands U19	12	(2)
- * Club domestic league appearances and goals as of 13:43, 10 June 2026 (UTC) ‡ National team caps and goals as of 13:43, 10 June 2026 (UTC)

Precious Joel Uche-Chukwu Ugwu (born 8 February 2006) is a professional footballer who plays as a centre-back for FC Volendam in the Eredivisie. Born in Germany, he is a youth international for the Netherlands.

== Club career ==
Born in Filderstadt, Germany, Ugwu joined the Ajax youth academy in 2014 at the age of eight, spending eleven years progressing through the club's age groups. He made his professional debut on 26 February 2024 in a Keuken Kampioen Divisie match for Jong Ajax against Telstar. Ugwu transferred toFC Volendam on 1 July 2025, signing a three-year contract.

== International career ==
Ugwu was born in Germany and raised in the Netherlands, to a Nigerian father and Bosnian mother. He represented the Netherlands at under-17, under-18, and under-19 level. He was part of the Netherlands U19s that won the 2025 UEFA European Under-19 Championship.

== Honours ==
Netherlands U19

- UEFA European Under-19 Championship: 2025
