= Jan Faberski =

Polish footballer (born 2006)

Personal information
- Full name: Jan Jakub Faberski
- Date of birth: 22 April 2006 (age 20)
- Place of birth: Płock, Poland
- Height: 1.76 m (5 ft 9 in)
- Positions: Winger; attacking midfielder; wide midfielder

Team information
- Current team: PEC Zwolle (on loan from Jong Ajax)
- Number: 7

Youth career
- –2014: Hutnik Warsaw
- 2014–2017: FFA Warsaw
- 2018: Legia Warsaw
- 2018–2020: FFA Warsaw
- 2020–2022: Jagiellonia Białystok
- 2022–2024: Ajax

Senior career*
| Years | Team | Apps | (Gls) |
| 2024– | Jong Ajax | 35 | (4) |
| 2025–2026 | → PEC Zwolle (loan) | 18 | (0) |

International career^{‡}
| 2021–2022 | Poland U16 | 4 | (0) |
| 2022 | Poland U17 | 5 | (0) |
| 2024–2025 | Poland U19 | 9 | (1) |
| 2024– | Poland U21 | 6 | (0) |
- * Club domestic league appearances and goals as of 17 May 2026 ‡ National team caps and goals as of 00:25, 28 March 2026 (UTC)

Jan Jakub Faberski (born 22 April 2006) is a Polish professional footballer who plays as a winger, attacking midfielder or wide midfielder for Dutch Eerste Divisie club Jong Ajax.

== Club career ==
=== Early career ===
Faberski started his youth career with Hutnik Warsaw. In 2014, he moved to the Football Frendz Academy (FFA) Warsaw, where he remained until 2020, apart from a short spell within Legia Warsaw's academy structure in 2018. In 2020, he joined the youth academy of Ekstraklasa club Jagiellonia Białystok.

=== Ajax ===
In July 2022, Faberski moved abroad, signing for the youth academy of Dutch side Ajax. He initially played for the club's under-17 and under-18 teams, including appearances in the UEFA Youth League.

Ahead of the 2024–25 season, Faberski was promoted to Jong Ajax, the club's reserve side competing in the Eerste Divisie. He made his professional debut on 12 August 2024, starting in a 2–2 draw with Jong PSV. On 24 August 2024, he scored his first professional goal with a notable strike during a 3–0 win over FC Eindhoven, which was subsequently voted Ajax's Goal of the Month for August. He established himself as a regular player for Jong Ajax throughout the season, contributing goals and assists primarily from the wing.

== International career ==
Faberski has represented Poland at various youth international levels. He made four appearances for the Poland U16 team between 2021 and 2022, followed by five appearances for the U17 team in 2022. In September 2024, he made his debut for the Poland U19 team. He scored his first goal at U19 level and earned 9 caps for the side by November 2024. Also in November 2024, Faberski received his first call-up to the Poland U21 team, making his debut in that same window. In March 2026, he suffered a serious knee injury in a game against Armenia U21 that required surgery and a long recovery.

== Style of play ==
Faberski mainly operates as a right winger, cutting inside onto his preferred left foot, but can also play as an attacking midfielder. He has been noted for his dribbling ability and has received comparisons to former Netherlands international Arjen Robben.

== Personal life ==
Faberski was born on 22 April 2006 in Płock, Poland. He is the son of Polish football youth coach Grzegorz Faberski.

== Career statistics ==
As of match played 13 March 2026

Appearances and goals by club, season and competition
| Club | Season | League | | | KNVB Cup | | Europe | | Other | | Total | |
| Club | Season | Division | Apps | Goals | Apps | Goals | Apps | Goals | Apps | Goals | Apps | Goals |
|---|---|---|---|---|---|---|---|---|---|---|---|---|
| Jong Ajax | 2024–25 | Eerste Divisie | 34 | 4 | — | | — | | — | | 34 | 4 |
| Jong Ajax | 2025–26 | Eerste Divisie | 1 | 0 | — | | — | | — | | 1 | 0 |
| Jong Ajax | Total | | 35 | 4 | — | | — | | — | | 35 | 4 |
| PEC Zwolle (loan) | 2025–26 | Eredivisie | 18 | 0 | 1 | 0 | — | | — | | 19 | 0 |
| Career total | | | 53 | 4 | 1 | 0 | 0 | 0 | 0 | 0 | 54 | 4 |
