= Julian Rijkhoff =

Dutch footballer (born 2005)

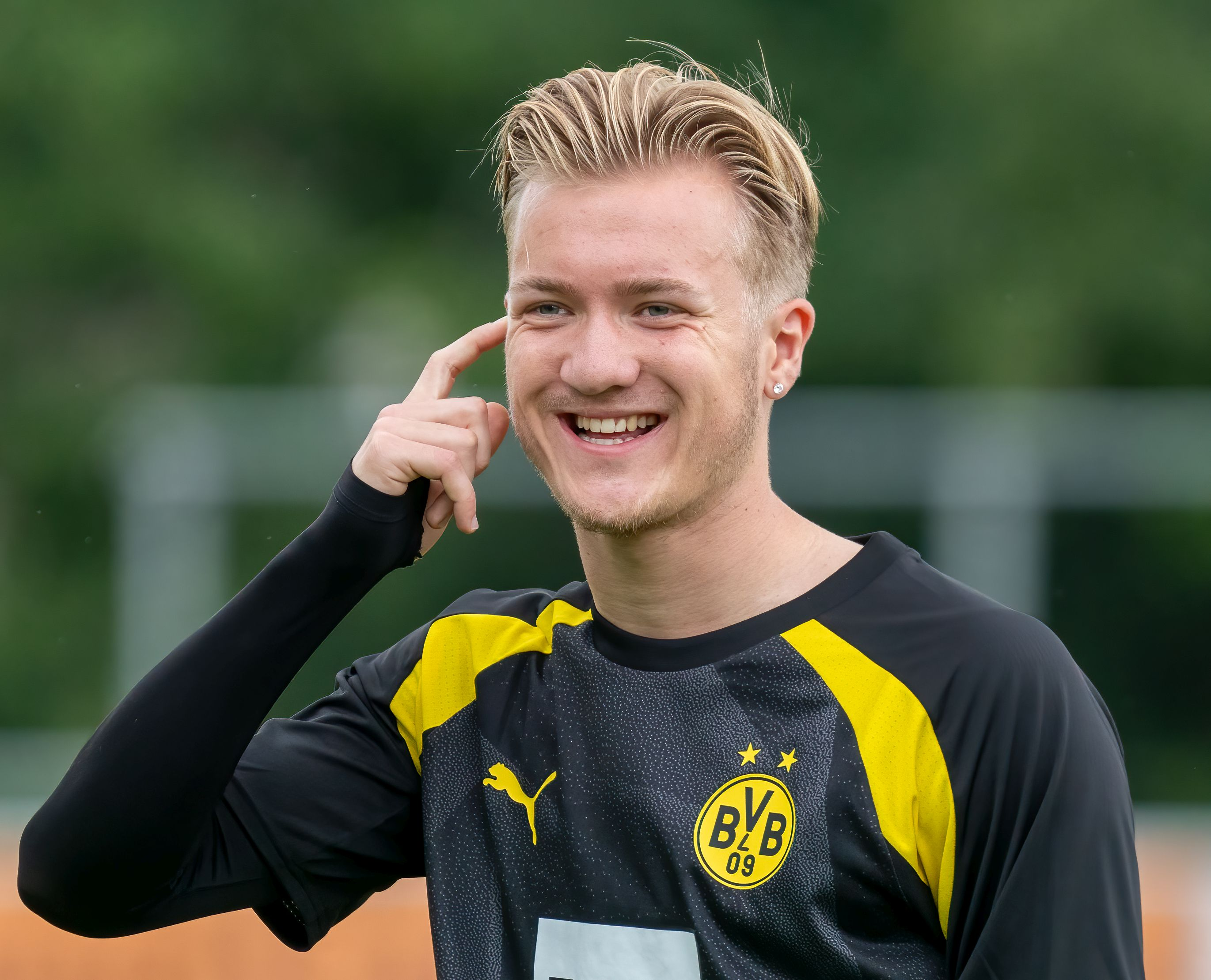
- Rijkhoff in 2023

Personal information
- Full name: Julian Dean Rijkhoff
- Date of birth: 25 January 2005 (age 21)
- Place of birth: Purmerend, Netherlands
- Height: 1.83 m (6 ft 0 in)
- Position: Forward

Team information
- Current team: Andorra (on loan from Ajax)
- Number: 9

Youth career
- 2012–2013: FC Purmerend
- 2013–2021: Ajax
- 2021–2024: Borussia Dortmund

Senior career*
Years	Team	Apps	(Gls)
2023	Borussia Dortmund II	0	(0)
2024–2025	Jong Ajax	42	(15)
2024–	Ajax	8	(0)
2025–2026	→ Almere City (loan)	37	(17)
2026–	→ Andorra (loan)	4	(0)

International career^{‡}
2020	Netherlands U15	5	(7)
2021–2022	Netherlands U17	10	(2)
2022–2023	Netherlands U18	5	(3)
2023–2024	Netherlands U19	9	(3)
- * Club domestic league appearances and goals as of 28 September 2026 ‡ National team caps and goals as of 23 March 2024

Julian Dean Rijkhoff (born 25 January 2005) is a Dutch professional footballer who plays as a forward for Segunda División club Andorra, on loan from Ajax.

== Club career ==
Rijkhoff started his career with local side FC Purmerend, before a move to Ajax in 2013. In 2021 he made a controversial move to Germany to sign for Borussia Dortmund, with Dutch footballing legend Marco van Basten criticising the deal.

In September 2022, he was named by English newspaper The Guardian as one of the best players born in 2005 worldwide.

In January 2024, Rijkhoff returned to Ajax. On 22 June of the following year, he moved on loan to Almere City.

On 27 July 2026, Rijkhoff was loaned to Segunda División side Andorra, with a buyout clause; his contract with Ajax was also extended until 2028.

== Career statistics ==
As of match played 20 December 2025

Appearances and goals by club, season and competition
Club	Season	League			Cup		Europe		Other		Total	
Club	Season	Division	Apps	Goals	Apps	Goals	Apps	Goals	Apps	Goals	Apps	Goals
Jong Ajax	2023–24	Eerste Divisie	12	6	—		—		—		12	6
Jong Ajax	2024–25	Eerste Divisie	29	9	—		—		—		29	9
Jong Ajax	Total		41	15	—		—		—		41	15
Ajax	2023–24	Eredivisie	8	0	0	0	2 (Note: Appearances in UEFA Europa Conference League)	0	—		10	0
Ajax	2024–25	Eredivisie	0	0	0	0	1 (Note: Appearances in UEFA Europa League)	0	—		1	0
Ajax	Total		8	0	0	0	3	0	—		11	0
Almere City (loan)	2025–26	Eerste Divisie	20	10	2	2	—		—		22	12
Career total			69	25	2	2	3	0	0	0	74	27
