= 2025–26 Jong FC Utrecht season =

Jong FC Utrecht
2025–26 season
- Head coach: Mark Otten
- Stadium: Sportcomplex Zoudenbalch; Stadion Galgenwaard
- Keuken Kampioen Divisie: 12th
- Top goalscorer: League: Rafik El Arguioui (11); All: Rafik El Arguioui (11)
- Highest home attendance: 1,205 (vs. Vitesse, 13 April 2026, Keuken Kampioen Divisie)
- Lowest home attendance: 241 (vs. Jong AZ, 30 September 2025, Keuken Kampioen Divisie)
- Average home league attendance: 479
- Biggest win: 1–4, 3-0 (vs. Jong AZ, 12 December 2025, Keuken Kampioen Divisie) (vs. FC Eindhoven, 17 April 2026, Keuken Kampioen Divisie)
- Biggest defeat: 4–0 (vs. Almere City FC, 26 September 2025, Keuken Kampioen Divisie)
Home colours	Away colours	Third colours

The 2025–26 season was the 10th season of Jong FC Utrecht at the second level of Dutch football. Before that, they played in the Beloften Eredivisie.

== Players ==
=== U23-team squad ===
As of 25 April 2026

Note: Flags indicate national team as defined under FIFA eligibility rules; some limited exceptions apply. Players may hold more than one non-FIFA nationality.

No.	Pos.	Nation	Player
—	GK	NED	Michael Brouwer
—	GK	NED	Mees Eppink
—	GK	NED	Justin Eversen
—	GK	NED	Kevin Gadellaa
—	GK	NED	Luca Neu
—	GK	NED	Laolu Oladipo
—	GK	NED	Martin Tsankov
—	DF	ENG	Emeka Adiele
—	DF	NED	Noël Beulens
—	DF	NED	Brian van den Boogaard
—	DF	NED	Massien Ghaddari
—	DF	CUW	~~Nazjir Held~~ (Note: Left during the season.)
—	DF	NED	Per Kloosterboer
—	DF	NED	Wessel Kooy (captain)
—	DF	NED	Driss Laaouina
—	DF	NED	~~Hylke van der Mast~~
—	DF	NED	~~Joshua Mukeh~~
—	DF	NED	Viggo Plantinga
—	DF	NED	Jesper van Riel
—	DF	NED	Neal Viereck
—	MF	MAR	Oualid Agougil
—	MF	MAR	Rafik El Arguioui

No.	Pos.	Nation	Player
—	MF	NED	Noa Dundas
—	MF	NED	Kenji Goes
—	MF	IRQ	Zidane Iqbal
—	MF	IDN	~~Ivar Jenner~~
—	MF	NED	Jaygo van Ommeren
—	MF	NED	Jessey Sneijder
—	MF	NED	Nick de Vos
—	MF	NED	Sil van der Wegen
—	FW	ESP	~~Gustav Arcos Sundqvist~~
—	FW	ENG	Adrian Blake
—	FW	NED	Tijn den Boggende
—	FW	MAR	Dani Bouchta
—	FW	TUR	Emirhan Demircan
—	FW	NED	Shedrach Ebite
—	FW	NED	Lynden Edhart
—	FW	NED	~~Jesse van de Haar~~
—	FW	DEN	Markus Jensen (on loan from Odense BK)
—	FW	IDN	~~Miliano Jonathans~~
—	FW	NED	Björn Menzo
—	FW	NED	Rayan El Miloudi
—	FW	NED	~~Noah Ohio~~

== Transfers ==
=== Summer ===
==== Transfers in ====
Nat.	Pos.	Player	Transferred from	Particularities	Ref.
(Netherlands) NED	GK	Martin Tsankov	(Netherlands) VItesse U19	Transfer free	
(Denmark) DEN	FW	Markus Jensen	(Denmark) Odense BK	On loan (+option to buy)	
(Spain) ESP	FW	Gustav Arcos Sundqvist	(Netherlands) FC Utrecht U19	Internal transfer	
(Netherlands) NED	DF	Brian van den Boogaard	(Netherlands) FC Utrecht U19	Internal transfer	
(Netherlands) NED	FW	Shedrach Ebite	(Netherlands) FC Utrecht U19	Internal transfer	
(Netherlands) NED	GK	Justin Eversen	(Netherlands) FC Utrecht U19	Internal transfer	
(Netherlands) NED	DF	Hylke van der Mast	(Netherlands) FC Utrecht U19	Internal transfer	
(Netherlands) NED	FW	Björn Menzo	(Netherlands) FC Utrecht U19	Internal transfer	
(Netherlands) NED	DF	Joshua Mukeh	(Netherlands) FC Utrecht	Internal transfer	
(Netherlands) NED	MF	Jaygo van Ommeren	(Netherlands) FC Utrecht U19	Internal transfer	
(Netherlands) NED	DF	Viggo Plantinga	(Netherlands) FC Utrecht U19	Internal transfer	
(Netherlands) NED	MF	Jessey Sneijder	(Netherlands) FC Utrecht U19	Internal transfer	
(Netherlands) NED	FW	Jesse van de Haar	(Netherlands) De Graafschap	Back from loan	

==== Transfers out ====
Nat.	Pos.	Player	Transferred to	Particularities	Ref.
(Greece) GRE	FW	Georgios Charalampoglou	(Greece) Asteras Tripolis	Sold	
(Denmark) DEN	GK	Andreas Dithmer	(Denmark) Hillerød Fodbold	Sold	
(Curaçao) CUW	DF	Nazjir Held	(Netherlands) RKC Waalwijk	Sold	
(Netherlands) NED	FW	Mees Akkerman	(Netherlands) FC Volendam U21	Transfer free	
(Morocco) MAR	GK	Ahmed Azmi	(Morocco) Ittihad Tanger	Transfer free	
(Netherlands) NED	DF	Achraf Boumenjal	(Spain) CE Atlètic Lleida	Transfer free	
(Netherlands) NED	DF	Michel Driezen	Without Club	Transfer free	
(France) FRA	MF	Sofiane Dris	(Luxembourg) Union Titus Pétange	Transfer free	
(United States) USA	DF	Rickson van Hees	Without Club	Transfer free	
(Netherlands) NED	MF	Gibson Yah	(Netherlands) FC Volendam	Transfer free	
(Morocco) MAR	MF	Rafik El Arguioui	(Netherlands) FC Utrecht	Internal transfer	
(Netherlands) NED	FW	Jesse van de Haar	(Netherlands) FC Utrecht	Internal transfer	
(Netherlands) NED	MF	Jaygo van Ommeren	(Netherlands) FC Utrecht	Internal transfer	
(Estonia) EST	FW	Tony Varjund	(Estonia) FC Flora Tallinn	Back from loan (+option to buy)	

=== Winter ===
==== Transfers out ====
Nat.	Pos.	Player	Transferred to	Particularities	Ref.
(Netherlands) NED	DF	Hylke van der Mast	(Netherlands) Vitesse U21	Transfer free	
(Netherlands) NED	DF	Joshua Mukeh	(Netherlands) FC Emmen	Transfer free	
(Indonesia) IDN	MF	Ivar Jenner	(Indonesia) Dewa United FC	Contract terminated	
(Spain) ESP	FW	Gustav Arcos Sundqvist	(Netherlands) Jong Sparta Rotterdam	On loan (+option to buy)	

== Pre-season and friendlies ==
Win Draw Loss Fixtures

3 July 2025 Friendly	Jong FC Utrecht (Netherlands)	0–1	(Germany) SV Rödinghausen	Doorwerth, Netherlands
		Report	Unknown

11 July 2025 Friendly	Jong KAA Gent (Belgium)	1–1	(Netherlands) Jong FC Utrecht	Belgium
	Unknown	Report	Van der Wegen

19 July 2025 Friendly	KV Kortrijk (Belgium)	0–1	(Netherlands) Jong FC Utrecht	Mouscron, Belgium
		Report	Ebite (pen.)	Stadium: Guldensporenstadion

2 August 2025 Friendly	Almere City FC (Netherlands)	3–1	(Netherlands) Jong FC Utrecht	Almere, Netherlands
12:15 CEST (UTC+2)	Providence 70', 90'; Goghli 80'	Report	Arcos Sundqvist 34'	Stadium: Yanmar Stadion

13 August 2025 Friendly	Al-Khaleej FC (Saudi Arabia)	2–2	(Netherlands) Jong FC Utrecht	Netherlands
	Al-Hawsawi,	Report	Dundas; Den Boggende

== Competition ==
=== Overall record ===
Competition	First match	Last match	Starting round	Final position	Record							
Competition	First match	Last match	Starting round	Final position	Pld	W	D	L	GF	GA	GD	Win %
Keuken Kampioen Divisie	8 August 2025	24 April 2026	Matchday 1	12th	38	12	10	16	58	62	−4	31.58
Total					38	12	10	16	58	62	−4	31.58

Last updated: 25 April 2026
Source: Soccerway

=== Keuken Kampioen Divisie ===
==== League table ====
Pos	Team	Pld	W	D	L	GF	GA	GD	Pts	Promotion or qualification
10	Dordrecht	38	12	11	15	48	56	−8	47	
11	Eindhoven	38	14	5	19	51	69	−18	47	
12	Jong FC Utrecht	38	12	10	16	58	62	−4	46	Reserve teams are not eligible to be promoted to the Eredivisie
13	VVV-Venlo	38	13	6	19	50	58	−8	45	
14	Emmen	38	12	9	17	58	72	−14	45	

Source: Flashscore, Keuken Kampioen Divisie (in Dutch)
Rules for classification: Season in progress: 1) Most points won; 2) Less points lost; 3) Goal difference; 4) Goals scored; 5) Head-to-head points; 6) Head-to-head goal difference; 7) Head-to-head goals scored 8) Head-to-head away goals scored 9) Alphabetical order; End of season: 1) Points; 2) Goal difference; 3) Goals scored; 4) Head-to-head points; 5) Head-to-head goal difference; 6) Head-to-head goals scored 7) Head-to-head away goals scored; 8) Extra match or series of matches 9) Goal difference (series of matches) 10) Goals scored (series of matches) 11) Penalty shoot-out (extra match or series of matches)

==== Results summary ====
Overall								Home						Away					
Pld	W	D	L	GF	GA	GD	Pts	W	D	L	GF	GA	GD	W	D	L	GF	GA	GD
38	12	10	16	58	62	−4	46	8	5	6	37	33	+4	4	5	10	21	29	−8

Last updated: 25 April 2026.
Source: Eerste divisie

==== Results by round ====
Round	1	2	3	4	5	6	7	8	9	10	11	12	13	14	15	16	17	18	19	20	21	22	23	24	25	26	27	28	29	30	31	32	33	34	35	36	37	38
Ground	A	H	H	A	H	A	H	A	H	A	H	A	H	A	H	A	H	A	H	A	H	A	H	A	H	A	H	A	H	A	H	A	H	A	A	H	H	A
Result	L	D	W	L	W	L	L	L	D	L	W	W	D	D	L	D	W	W	L	W	L	D	W	D	D	L	D	L	L	L	W	L	W	D	L	L	W	W
Position	14	13	8	11	9	10	14	17	17	18	14	11	13	13	14	16	14	13	14	11	13	12	11	10	10	13	12	13	14	14	14	14	12	13	15	15	13	12

Updated to match(es) played on 25 April 2026. Source: Eerste divisie
A = Away; H = Home; W = Win; D = Draw; L = Loss

==== Matches ====
The league fixtures were announced on 24 June 2025.

8 August 2025 1	FC Eindhoven	1–0	Jong FC Utrecht	Eindhoven
20:00 CEST (UTC+2)	Neeskens (yellow card) 30'; Blummel 69'	Report	Mukeh (yellow card) 73'	Stadium: Jan Louwers Stadion; Attendance: 1,923; Referee: Stan Teuben

18 August 2025 2	Jong FC Utrecht	2–2	ADO Den Haag	Utrecht
20:00 CEST (UTC+2)	Demircan 47', (yellow card) 48'; Van de Haar 63'	Report	Reischl 52', (yellow card) 88'; Vlak 67' (pen.)	Stadium: Stadion Galgenwaard; Attendance: 805; Referee: Rick Sturm

25 August 2025 3	Jong FC Utrecht	4–3	Jong Ajax	Utrecht
20:00 CEST (UTC+2)	Dundas 11'; Van de Haar (penalty missed) 16'; Demircan (penalty missed) 38', 69'; Johnson 46' (o.g.); Van der Wegen 56'; Iqbal (yellow card) 87'	Report	Bounida 2', 58'; Jetten (yellow card) 16'; Kaplan 72'	Stadium: Sportcomplex Zoudenbalch; Attendance: 461; Referee: Martin Pérez

29 August 2025 4	Willem II	2–1	Jong FC Utrecht	Tilburg
20:00 CEST (UTC+2)	Haen 29'; Mathijsen (yellow card) 56'; Verheydt 90+2'	Report	Dundas (yellow card) 8', (goal) 70'	Stadium: Koning Willem II Stadion; Attendance: 13,100; Referee: Stan Teuben

12 September 2025 5	Jong FC Utrecht	2–0	RKC Waalwijk	Utrecht
20:00 CEST (UTC+2)	Ghaddari 45+1'; Jenner 73'	Report	Uneken (yellow card) 85'	Stadium: Sportcomplex Zoudenbalch; Attendance: 411; Referee: Laurens Gerrets

16 September 2025 6	Helmond Sport	2–1	Jong FC Utrecht	Helmond
20:00 CEST (UTC+2)	Essakkati 8'; Vos (yellow card) 52'; Makanza (yellow card) 56'; Ogenia 72'; Bajrami (yellow card) 85'	Report	Dundas 70'	Stadium: GS Staalwerken Stadion; Attendance: 1,267; Referee: Joshua Kuipers

22 September 2025 7	Jong FC Utrecht	2–4	SC Cambuur	Utrecht
20:00 CEST (UTC+2)	Jonathans 39'; Ohio 51'; Mukeh (yellow card) 71'	Report	Diemers 16'; Sjöstrand 17', 66'; Balk 23'	Stadium: Sportcomplex Zoudenbalch; Attendance: 455; Referee: Kevin Puts

26 September 2025 8	Almere City FC	4–0	Jong FC Utrecht	Almere
20:00 CEST (UTC+2)	Rijkhoff 20'; Kadile 61', 90+3'; Poku 85'	Report		Stadium: Yanmar Stadion; Attendance: 4,501; Referee: Rick Sturm

30 September 2025 9	Jong FC Utrecht	0–0	Jong AZ	Utrecht
20:00 CEST (UTC+2)	Mukeh (yellow card) 52'; Agougil (yellow card) 75'	Report		Stadium: Sportcomplex Zoudenbalch; Attendance: 241; Referee: Niels Boel

3 October 2025 10	Vitesse	2–0	Jong FC Utrecht	Arnhem
20:00 CEST (UTC+2)	Hoogewerf 10'; Büttner (yellow card) 40'; Schikora (yellow card) 41'; Huth 52'; Steffen (yellow card) 84'; Schwarz (yellow card) 90+4'	Report	Van de Haar (yellow card) 37'; Jenner (yellow card) 40'; Agougil (yellow card) 90+2'	Stadium: GelreDome; Attendance: 16,030; Referee: Laurens Gerrets

17 October 2025 11	Jong FC Utrecht	3–1	MVV Maastricht	Utrecht
20:00 CEST (UTC+2)	Ohio 9', 20'; Jensen 52'	Report	Mmaee 19', (yellow card) 79'; Breugelmans (yellow card) 45+3'	Stadium: Sportcomplex Zoudenbalch; Attendance: 455; Referee: Kevin Puts

21 October 2025 12	VVV-Venlo	0–1	Jong FC Utrecht	Venlo
20:00 CEST (UTC+2)	Davis (yellow card) 7'	Report	Ohio 8' (pen.); Van Ommeren (yellow card) 12'; Agougil (yellow card) 16'	Stadium: Seacon Stadion - De Koel; Attendance: 3,802; Referee: Niels Boel

24 October 2025 13	Jong FC Utrecht	0–0	TOP Oss	Utrecht
20:00 CEST (UTC+2)	Jenner (yellow card) 77'	Report	Cox (yellow card) 38', (red card) 57'; Hinoke (yellow card) 65'; Slagveer (yellow card) 90+3'	Stadium: Sportcomplex Zoudenbalch; Attendance: 310; Referee: Boyd van Kommer

1 November 2025 14	Roda JC Kerkrade	1–1	Jong FC Utrecht	Kerkrade
16:30 CET (UTC+1)	Breij 56'	Report	Viereck 78'; Kooy (yellow card) 90+1'	Stadium: Parkstad Limburg Stadion; Attendance: 8,900; Referee: Richard Martens

7 November 2025 15	Jong FC Utrecht	1–2	FC Emmen	Utrecht
20:00 CET (UTC+1)	El Arguioui 14'; Agougil (yellow card) 19'	Report	Postema (penalty missed) 21'; Mulder 69'; Gerezgiher 75'	Stadium: Sportcomplex Zoudenbalch; Attendance: 345; Referee: Joshua Kuipers

21 November 2025 16	Jong PSV	3–3	Jong FC Utrecht	Eindhoven
20:00 CET (UTC+1)	Verkooijen 12', 33'; Van Duiven 46'; Abed (yellow card) 59'	Report	Ohio 56', 61'; Viereck 90'; Van Ommeren (yellow card) 90+5'	Stadium: PSV Campus De Herdgang; Attendance: 400; Referee: Boyd van Kommer

24 November 2025 17	Jong FC Utrecht	3–2	FC Den Bosch	Utrecht
20:00 CET (UTC+1)	Ohio 43', 69'; Mukeh (yellow card) 49'; El Arguioui 89' (pen.)	Report	Semedo 59'; Bodo (yellow card) 83'; Barglan 86'	Stadium: Sportcomplex Zoudenbalch; Attendance: 377; Referee: Thomas Hardeman

28 November 2025 18	FC Dordrecht	1–2	Jong FC Utrecht	Dordrecht
20:00 CET (UTC+1)	Van Aken 64'; Bae (yellow card) 65'; Drakpe (yellow card) 87'	Report	Ohio (yellow card) 39', (goal) 53'; Demircan 59'; Iqbal (yellow card) 75'	Stadium: M-Scores Stadion; Attendance: 2,250; Referee: Laurens Gerrets

8 December 2025 19	Jong FC Utrecht	2–3	De Graafschap	Utrecht
20:00 CET (UTC+1)	Van de Haar 37'; Den Boggende (yellow card) 79'; Dundas 90+1'	Report	El Kadiri 6'; Boersma 9'; Meerstadt (yellow card) 39'; Besselink (yellow card) 46'; Van der Heide 85'	Stadium: Sportcomplex Zoudenbalch; Attendance: 550; Referee: Joshua Kuipers

8 December 2025 20	Jong AZ	1–4	Jong FC Utrecht	Wijdewormer
20:00 CET (UTC+1)	Van den Ban 81'	Report	Van der Wegen 11'; Demircan (yellow card) 19', (goal) 38', 65'; Viereck (yellow card) 47', (goal) 55'; Dundas (yellow card) 70'; El Arguioui (yellow card) 77'	Stadium: AFAS Trainingscomplex; Attendance: 315; Referee: Kevin Puts

22 December 2025 21	Jong FC Utrecht	1–3	Roda JC Kerkrade	Utrecht
20:00 CET (UTC+1)	El Arguioui 36'; Viereck (yellow card) 89'	Report	Beerten 20'; Kruiver 29', (yellow card) 84'; Breij (yellow card) 53', (goal) 90+4' (pen.); Seedorf (yellow card) 65'; Treichel (yellow card) 88'	Stadium: Sportcomplex Zoudenbalch; Attendance: 701; Referee: Niels Boel

19 January 2026 23	Jong FC Utrecht	5–3	Jong PSV	Utrecht
20:00 CET (UTC+1)	Van Ommeren (yellow card) 9'; Kloosterboer (yellow card) 13'; El Arguioui 18'; Viereck 28'; Menzo 57'; Plantinga 68'; Kooy (yellow card) 88'; Dundas (yellow card) 90'; Ghaddari 90+2'	Report	Bouhoudane 9' (pen.); Bouhamdi 11'; Van den Berg 30'; Van der Plas (yellow card) 52'; Kuhn (yellow card) 71'; Bahaty (yellow card) 81'	Stadium: Sportcomplex Zoudenbalch; Attendance: 266; Referee: Thomas Hardeman

23 January 2026 24	MVV Maastricht	2–2	Jong FC Utrecht	Maastricht
20:00 CET (UTC+1)	Tran (yellow card) 44'; Braken 70' (pen.); Breugelmans 90+6'	Report	Den Boggende 4'; El Arguioui 47' (pen.); Van der Wegen (yellow card) 81' (yellow-red card) 90+2'	Stadium: Stadion De Geusselt; Attendance: 2,851; Referee: Joshua Kuipers

26 January 2026 22	RKC Waalwijk	2–2	Jong FC Utrecht	Waalwijk
20:00 CET (UTC+1)	Van der Leij 6', 20'; Al Mazyani (yellow card) 63'; Spenkelink (yellow card) 90+2'	Report	Kooy 90'; Ghaddari 90+4'	Stadium: Mandemakers Stadion; Attendance: 2,741; Referee: Rick Sturm

2 February 2026 25	Jong FC Utrecht	2–2	VVV-Venlo	Utrecht
20:00 CET (UTC+1)	Viereck (yellow card) 7'; Van der Wegen (yellow card) 26'; De Blok 48' (o.g.); Ebite 89'	Report	Van Zijl 15'; Ait Mouhou (yellow card) 56'; Sbai (yellow card) 66'; Zandbergen 79'	Stadium: Sportcomplex Zoudenbalch; Attendance: 343; Referee: Niels Boel

16 February 2026 27	Jong FC Utrecht	1–1	Willem II	Utrecht
20:00 CET (UTC+1)	Besselink 42' (o.g.); Demircan (penalty missed) 55'; Van der Wegen (yellow card) 63'	Report	Besselink (yellow card) 61'; Haen 88'	Stadium: Stadion Galgenwaard; Attendance: 476; Referee: Kevin Puts

28 February 2026 28	De Graafschap	1–0	Jong FC Utrecht	Doetinchem
20:00 CET (UTC+1)	Gijselhart (yellow card) 60'; De Jong 78'; Meerstadt (yellow card) 90+2'; Wieggers (yellow card) 90+4'	Report	Dundas (yellow card) 65'	Stadium: De Vijverberg; Attendance: 10,522; Referee: Joshua Kuipers

27 February 2026 29	Jong FC Utrecht	2–3	Almere City FC	Utrecht
20:00 CET (UTC+1)	El Arguioui 16' (pen.); Demircan 23'	Report	Druijf 6'; Providence 73'; Rijkhoff 79'; Kalisvaart (yellow card) 86'	Stadium: Sportcomplex Zoudenbalch; Attendance: 544; Referee: Clay Ruperti

2 March 2026 26	FC Emmen	1–0	Jong FC Utrecht	Emmen
20:00 CET (UTC+1)	Postema 5'; Søndergaard (yellow card) 55'	Report	Dundas (yellow card) 29'; Van Ommeren (yellow card) 43'	Stadium: De Oude Meerdijk; Attendance: 6,335; Referee: Thomas Hardeman

8 March 2026 30	SC Cambuur	1–0	Jong FC Utrecht	Leeuwarden
16:45 CET (UTC+1)	Van der Sande (yellow card) 36'; Balk (yellow card) 51'; Sjöstrand 63'; Mulders (yellow card) 84'	Report		Stadium: Kooi Stadion; Attendance: 14,233; Referee: Laurens Gerrets

13 March 2026 31	Jong FC Utrecht	1–0	Helmond Sport	Utrecht
20:00 CET (UTC+1)	Sneijder (yellow card) 75'; Jensen 81'; El Arguioui (yellow card) 88'	Report	Dizdarević (yellow card) 19'	Stadium: Sportcomplex Zoudenbalch; Attendance: 312; Referee: Niels Boel

17 March 2026 32	ADO Den Haag	1–0	Jong FC Utrecht	The Hague
20:00 CET (UTC+1)	Rottier 50'	Report		Stadium: WerkTalent Stadion; Attendance: 14,525; Referee: Shona Shukrula

20 March 2026 33	Jong FC Utrecht	3–1	FC Dordrecht	Utrecht
20:00 CET (UTC+1)	Den Boggende 22', 58', (yellow card) 62'; El Arguioui 32'; Jensen (yellow card) 84'	Report	Van Vianen (yellow card) 36'; Biai (yellow card) 60'; Venema 76', (yellow card) 82'; Plug (yellow card) 81'	Stadium: Sportcomplex Zoudenbalch; Attendance: 353; Referee: Joshua Kuipers

6 April 2026 35	TOP Oss	3–1	Jong FC Utrecht	Oss
16:45 CEST (UTC+2)	Wildeboer 50'; Miguel 58'; Hinoke 76'	Report	Viereck (yellow card) 5'; El Arguioui 7'	Stadium: Frans Heesen Stadion; Attendance: 3,173; Referee: Kevin Puts

13 April 2026 36	Jong FC Utrecht	0–3	Vitesse	Utrecht
20:00 CEST (UTC+2)	Kloosterboer (yellow card) 53'	Report	Zonneveld 11'; Tahaui 30'; Schwarz (yellow card) 54'; Achouitar 67'	Stadium: Stadion Galgenwaard; Attendance: 1,205; Referee: Martin Pérez

17 April 2026 37	Jong FC Utrecht	3–0	FC Eindhoven	Utrecht
20:00 CEST (UTC+2)	Kloosterboer (yellow card) 13'; El Arguioui 22' (pen.); Den Boggende 24', 47'; Ghaddari (yellow card) 82'	Report	Neeskens (yellow card) 21'; Bryson (yellow card) 84' (yellow-red card) 90+3'	Stadium: Sportcomplex Zoudenbalch; Attendance: 487; Referee: Thomas Hardeman

20 April 2026 34	FC Den Bosch	1–1	Jong FC Utrecht	's-Hertogenbosch
20:00 CEST (UTC+2)	Van Leeuwen 12', (yellow card) 69'	Report	Kloosterboer (yellow card) 17'; Adiele (yellow card) 31'; El Arguioui (yellow card) 61', (goal) 76'; Iqbal (yellow card) 69'	Stadium: Stadion De Vliert; Attendance: 5,809; Referee: Niels Boel

24 April 2026 38	Jong Ajax	0–2	Jong FC Utrecht	Duivendrecht
20:00 CEST (UTC+2)	Ouazane (yellow card) 58'; Van der Vaart (yellow card) 77'	Report	Van der Wegen 19'; Laaouina (yellow card) 66'; El Arguioui 88', (yellow card) 88'	Stadium: Sportpark De Toekomst; Attendance: 1,625; Referee: Rick Sturm

== Statistics ==
=== Goalscorers ===
Friendlies

No.	Name	Goal
1.	(Spain) Gustav Arcos Sundqvist	1
1.	(Netherlands) Tijn den Boggende	1
1.	(Netherlands) Noa Dundas	1
1.	(Netherlands) Shedrach Ebite	1
1.	(Netherlands) Sil van der Wegen	1
Own goals opponent		-
Totals		5

(Netherlands) Keuken Kampioen Divisie

No.	Name	Goal
1.	(Morocco) Rafik El Arguioui	11
2.	(Netherlands) Noah Ohio	9
3.	(Turkey) Emirhan Demircan	6
4.	(Netherlands) Tijn den Boggende	5
5.	(Netherlands) Noa Dundas	4
5.	(Netherlands) Neal Viereck	4
7.	(Netherlands) Massien Ghaddari	3
7.	(Netherlands) Sil van der Wegen	3
9.	(Netherlands) Jesse van de Haar	2
9.	(Denmark) Markus Jensen	2
11.	(Netherlands) Shedrach Ebite	1
11.	(Indonesia) Ivar Jenner	1
11.	(Indonesia) Miliano Jonathans	1
11.	(Netherlands) Wessel Kooy	1
11.	(Netherlands) Björn Menzo	1
11.	(Netherlands) Viggo Plantinga	1
Own goals opponent		3
Totals		58

=== Assists ===
(Netherlands) Keuken Kampioen Divisie

No.	Name	
1.	(Morocco) Oualid Agougil	8
2.	(Morocco) Rafik El Arguioui	4
2.	(Netherlands) Noa Dundas	4
4.	(Denmark) Markus Jensen	3
4.	(Netherlands) Viggo Plantinga	3
6.	(Turkey) Emirhan Demircan	2
6.	(Netherlands) Lynden Edhart	2
6.	(Netherlands) Jaygo van Ommeren	2
6.	(Netherlands) Sil van der Wegen	2
10.	(England) Emeka Adiele	1
10.	(Netherlands) Massien Ghaddari	1
10.	(Iraq) Zidane Iqbal	1
10.	(Netherlands) Björn Menzo	1
10.	(Netherlands) Jesper van Riel	1
10.	(Netherlands) Neal Viereck	1
Totals		36

== Attendance Stadion Galgenwaard ==
Round	Opponent	Attendance	Total attendance	Average
Keuken Kampioen Divisie
2	ADO Den Haag	805	805	805
27	Willem II	476	1,281	641
36	Vitesse	1,205	2,486	829

== Attendance Sportcomplex Zoudenbalch ==
Round	Opponent	Attendance	Total attendance	Average
Keuken Kampioen Divisie
3	Jong Ajax	461	461	461
5	RKC Waalwijk	411	872	436
7	SC Cambuur	455	1,327	442
9	Jong AZ	241	1,568	392
11	MVV Maastricht	455	2,023	405
13	TOP Oss	310	2,333	389
15	FC Emmen	345	2,678	383
17	FC Den Bosch	377	3,055	382
19	De Graafschap	550	3,605	401
21	Roda JC Kerkrade	701	4,306	431
23	Jong PSV	266	4,572	416
25	VVV-Venlo	343	4,915	410
29	Almere City FC	544	5,459	420
31	Helmond Sport	312	5,771	412
33	FC Dordrecht	353	6,124	408
37	FC Eindhoven	487	6,611	413
