= 2026–27 Jong FC Utrecht season =

Jong FC Utrecht
2026–27 season
- Head coach: Mark Otten
- Stadium: Sportcomplex Zoudenbalch; Stadion Galgenwaard
- Keuken Kampioen Divisie: 19th
- Top goalscorer: League: Emmanuel Chigozie Owen (6); All: Emmanuel Chigozie Owen (6)
- Highest home attendance: 1,046 (vs. Vitesse, 17 August 2026, Keuken Kampioen Divisie)
- Lowest home attendance: 242 (vs. FC Emmen, 20 November 2026, Keuken Kampioen Divisie)
- Average home league attendance: 658
- Biggest win: 6–1 (vs. Jong Ajax, 14 September 2026, Keuken Kampioen Divisie)
- Biggest defeat: 1–6 (vs. Heracles Almelo, 24 August 2026, Keuken Kampioen Divisie)
Home colours	Away colours	Third colours

The 2026–27 season is the 11th season of Jong FC Utrecht at the second level of Dutch football. Before that, they played in the Beloften Eredivisie.

== Players ==
=== U23-team squad ===
As of 10 October 2026

Note: Flags indicate national team as defined under FIFA eligibility rules; some limited exceptions apply. Players may hold more than one non-FIFA nationality.

No.	Pos.	Nation	Player
—	GK	NED	Mees Eppink
—	GK	NED	Justin Eversen
—	GK	NED	Kevin Gadellaa
—	GK	NED	Laolu Oladipo
—	GK	NED	Martin Tsankov
—	DF	ENG	~~Emeka Adiele~~ (Note: Left during the season.)
—	DF	NED	Donovan Afrifa
—	DF	NED	Noël Beulens
—	DF	NED	Per Kloosterboer
—	DF	NED	Wessel Kooy
—	DF	NED	Driss Laaouina
—	DF	NED	Viggo Plantinga (captain)
—	DF	GER	Ferdinand Pohl
—	DF	NED	Thomas Reinders
—	DF	NED	Yousri Sbai (on loan from N.E.C.)
—	DF	GER	Jamie Schuldes
—	DF	NED	Tom Wellerdieck

No.	Pos.	Nation	Player
—	MF	MAR	Oualid Agougil
—	MF	MKD	Abdullah Aslani
—	MF	NED	Noa Dundas
—	MF	NED	Massien Ghaddari
—	MF	NED	Kenji Goes
—	MF	CZE	Matyáš Havelka
—	MF	NED	Jaygo van Ommeren
—	MF	NED	Jessey Sneijder
—	MF	NED	Nick de Vos
—	FW	NED	Tijn den Boggende
—	FW	GER	Emmanuel Chigozie Owen
—	FW	NED	Jesper Eujen
—	FW	GHA	Nana Gyamfi-Amoah
—	FW	CUW	Jerayno Hunte
—	FW	NED	Björn Menzo
—	FW	SWE	Richie Omorowa (on loan from Samsunspor)
—	FW	NED	Levi Rietveld

== Transfers ==
=== Summer ===
==== Transfers in ====
Nat.	Pos.	Player	Transferred from	Particularities	Ref.
(Ghana) GHA	FW	Nana Gyamfi-Amoah	(Ghana) Accra Shooting Stars FC	Reproduced	
(Sweden) SWE	FW	Richie Omorowa	(Turkey) Samsunspor	On loan (+option to buy)	
(Netherlands) NED	DF	Yousri Sbai	(Netherlands) N.E.C.	On loan (+option to buy)	
(North Macedonia) MKD	MF	Abdullah Aslani	(Denmark) Lyngby BK U19	Transfer free	
(Germany) GER	DF	Ferdinand Pohl	(Germany) Bayer 04 Leverkusen U19	Transfer free	
(Netherlands) NED	DF	Wessel Kooy	Without Club	Transfer free	
(Netherlands) NED	DF	Thomas Reinders	Without Club	Transfer free	
(Netherlands) NED	DF	Noël Beulens	(Netherlands) FC Utrecht U19	Internal transfer	
(Netherlands) NED	MF	Kenji Goes	(Netherlands) FC Utrecht U19	Internal transfer	
(Czech Republic) CZE	MF	Matyáš Havelka	(Netherlands) FC Utrecht U19	Internal transfer	
(Curaçao) CUW	FW	Jerayno Hunte	(Netherlands) FC Utrecht U19	Internal transfer	
(Netherlands) NED	DF	Driss Laaouina	(Netherlands) FC Utrecht	Internal transfer	
(Netherlands) NED	GK	Laolu Oladipo	(Netherlands) FC Utrecht U19	Internal transfer	
(Netherlands) NED	MF	Jaygo van Ommeren	(Netherlands) FC Utrecht	Internal transfer	
(Netherlands) NED	FW	Levi Rietveld	(Netherlands) FC Utrecht U19	Internal transfer	
(Spain) ESP	FW	Gustav Arcos Sundqvist	(Netherlands) Jong Sparta Rotterdam	Back from loan (+option to buy)	

==== Transfers out ====
Nat.	Pos.	Player	Transferred to	Particularities	Ref.
(Spain) ESP	FW	Gustav Arcos Sundqvist	(Netherlands) Jong Sparta Rotterdam	Buy option lifted	
(Netherlands) NED	DF	Brian van den Boogaard	(Netherlands) Helmond Sport U21	Contract terminated	
(Netherlands) NED	DF	Neal Viereck	(Spain) CD Tenerife	On loan	
(Netherlands) NED	FW	Shedrach Ebite	(Netherlands) Jong Sparta Rotterdam	Transfer free	
(Netherlands) NED	FW	Lynden Edhart	(Georgia (country)) FC Dila Gori	Transfer free	
(Netherlands) NED	DF	Wessel Kooy	Without Club	Transfer free	
(Netherlands) NED	DF	Jesper van Riel	Without Club	Transfer free	
(Netherlands) NED	MF	Sil van der Wegen	(Netherlands) MVV Maastricht	Transfer free	
(Morocco) MAR	MF	Oualid Agougil	(Netherlands) FC Utrecht	Internal transfer	
(Netherlands) NED	GK	Mees Eppink	(Netherlands) FC Utrecht	Internal transfer	
(Netherlands) NED	DF	Per Kloosterboer	(Netherlands) FC Utrecht	Internal transfer	
(Denmark) DEN	FW	Markus Jensen	(Denmark) Odense BK	Back from loan (+option to buy)	

== Competition ==
=== Overall record ===
Competition	First match	Last match	Starting round	Record							
Competition	First match	Last match	Starting round	Pld	W	D	L	GF	GA	GD	Win %
Keuken Kampioen Divisie	9 August 2026	14 May 2027	Matchday 1	15	4	2	9	24	34	−10	26.67
Total				15	4	2	9	24	34	−10	26.67

Last updated: 22 November 2026
Source: Soccerway

=== Keuken Kampioen Divisie ===
==== League table ====
Pos	Team	Pld	W	D	L	GF	GA	GD	Pts	Promotion or qualification
16	Jong PSV	15	4	5	6	19	24	−5	17	Reserve teams are not eligible to be promoted to the Eredivisie
17	Eindhoven	16	5	2	9	23	34	−11	17	
18	Helmond Sport	16	4	3	9	31	38	−7	15	
19	Jong FC Utrecht	15	4	2	9	24	34	−10	14	Reserve teams are not eligible to be promoted to the Eredivisie
20	Dordrecht	16	3	3	10	20	41	−21	12	

Updated to match(es) played on 21 November 2026. Source: Flashscore, Keuken Kampioen Divisie (in Dutch)
Rules for classification: Season in progress: 1) Most points won; 2) Less points lost; 3) Goal difference; 4) Goals scored; 5) Head-to-head points; 6) Head-to-head goal difference; 7) Head-to-head goals scored 8) Head-to-head away goals scored 9) Alphabetical order; End of season: 1) Points; 2) Goal difference; 3) Goals scored; 4) Head-to-head points; 5) Head-to-head goal difference; 6) Head-to-head goals scored 7) Head-to-head away goals scored; 8) Extra match or series of matches 9) Goal difference (series of matches) 10) Goals scored (series of matches) 11) Penalty shoot-out (extra match or series of matches)

==== Results summary ====
Overall								Home						Away					
Pld	W	D	L	GF	GA	GD	Pts	W	D	L	GF	GA	GD	W	D	L	GF	GA	GD
15	4	2	9	24	34	−10	14	3	1	4	14	17	−3	1	1	5	10	17	−7

Last updated: 22 November 2026.
Source: Eerste divisie

==== Results by round ====
Round	1	2	3	4	5	6	7	8	9	10	11	12	13	14	15	16	17	18	19	20	21	22	23	24	25	26	27	28	29	30	31	32	33	34	35	36	37	38
Ground	A	H	H	A	H	A	H	A	H	A	H	A	H	A	-	H	-	-	-	-	-	-	-	-	-	-	-	-	-	-	-	-	-	-	-	-	-	-
Result	L	L	L	L	D	W	L	L	W	L	L	L	W	D	-	W	-	-	-	-	-	-	-	-	-	-	-	-	-	-	-	-	-	-	-	-	-	-
Position	18	19	20	20	19	17	18	20	20	20	20	20	20	19	-	19	-	-	-	-	-	-	-	-	-	-	-	-	-	-	-	-	-	-	-	-	-	-

Updated to match(es) played on 22 November 2026. Source: Eerste divisie
A = Away; H = Home; W = Win; D = Draw; L = Loss

==== Matches ====
The league fixtures were announced on 16 June 2026.

9 August 2026 1	MVV Maastricht	2–1	Jong FC Utrecht	Maastricht
16:45 CEST (UTC+2)	Breugelmans 2'; Daneels (yellow card) 45+4'; Sierra 46'	Report	Menzo 6'; Adiele (yellow card) 16'	Stadium: Stadion "De Geusselt"; Attendance: 3,800; Referee: Rick Sturm

17 August 2026 2	Jong FC Utrecht	1–3	Vitesse	Utrecht
20:00 CEST (UTC+2)	Chigozle Owen 45'; Dundas (red card) 74'	Report	Schwarz (yellow card) 26'; Bannis 30', 73'; Sellouf 52'; Olde Keizer (yellow card) 58'; Büttner (penalty missed) 89'	Stadium: Stadion Galgenwaard; Attendance: 1,046; Referee: Thomas Hardeman

24 August 2026 3	Jong FC Utrecht	1–6	Heracles Almelo	Utrecht
20:00 CEST (UTC+2)	Menzo 51'	Report	Van Gilst 3', 39'; Scheperman 7'; N'Djoli 37', 59', (yellow card) 76'; Borac 45'	Stadium: Stadion Galgenwaard; Attendance: 861; Referee: Martin Pérez

28 August 2026 4	TOP Oss	2–1	Jong FC Utrecht	Oss
20:00 CEST (UTC+2)	Esajas 16'; Nsingi (yellow card) 17'; De Lannoy 65'	Report	Plantinga (yellow card) 25'; Hunte 88'	Stadium: Frans Heesen Stadion; Attendance: 1,642; Referee: Wouter Wiersma

31 August 2026 8	Jong AZ	2–1	Jong FC Utrecht	Wijdewormer
20:00 CEST (UTC+2)	Esajas (yellow card) 13'; Oufkir 22'; De Wit 46'	Report	Chigozle Owen 1'; Plantinga (yellow card) 16'; Schuldes (yellow card) 34'; Gyamfi-Amoah (yellow card) 90+3'	Stadium: AFAS Trainingscomplex; Attendance: 457; Referee: Andy Wolff

7 September 2026 5	Jong FC Utrecht	0–0	FC Eindhoven	Utrecht
20:00 CEST (UTC+2)		Report	Ali (yellow card) 87'	Stadium: Sportcomplex Zoudenbalch; Attendance: 362; Referee: Joshua Kuipers

11 September 2026 6	NAC Breda	2–3	Jong FC Utrecht	Breda
20:00 CEST (UTC+2)	Nazih (yellow card) 18'; Gladon 28', 44'	Report	Dundas 19', 48', (yellow card) 59'; Plantinga (yellow card) 54'; Chigozle Owen 65'; Ghaddari (yellow card) 66'; Goes (yellow card) 84'	Stadium: Rat Verlegh Stadion; Attendance: 19,380; Referee: Laurens Gerrets

14 September 2026 9	Jong FC Utrecht	6–1	Jong Ajax	Utrecht
20:00 CEST (UTC+2)	Kooy 12'; Ghaddari 21', 88'; Chigozle Owen 41', 74'; Dundas (yellow card) 54'; Menzo 55'; Schuldes (yellow card) 75'	Report	Van de Pavert (yellow card) 14'; Verkuijl (yellow card) 41'; Pugno 85'; Spina (yellow card) 90'; Monserrate (yellow card) 90'; Heerkens (red card) 90+6'	Stadium: Sportcomplex Zoudenbalch; Attendance: 438; Referee: Rick Sturm

18 September 2026 7	Jong FC Utrecht	1–3	VVV-Venlo	Utrecht
20:00 CEST (UTC+2)	Schuldes 38'; Plantinga (yellow card) 73'	Report	Ait Mouhou 14', 53'; Schenkhuizen 18'; Verstraeten (yellow card) 71'	Stadium: Sportcomplex Zoudenbalch; Attendance: 624; Referee: Niels Boel

9 October 2026 10	De Graafschap	2–1	Jong FC Utrecht	Doetinchem
20:00 CEST (UTC+2)	De Jong 74'; Kania 77', (yellow card) 88'; Hardeman (yellow card) 84'	Report	Kooy 24', (yellow card) 88'; Chigozie Owen (yellow card) 84'	Stadium: Stadion De Vijverberg; Attendance: 10,618; Referee: Joshua Kuipers

19 October 2026 11	Jong FC Utrecht	1–2	Roda JC Kerkrade	Utrecht
20:00 CEST (UTC+2)	Ghaddari 44', (yellow card) 50'	Report	Dorenbosch 57'; Marsman (yellow card) 85'; Van den Hurk 88'	Stadium: Sportcomplex Zoudenbalch; Attendance: 522; Referee: Jorg Ordelmans

23 October 2026 12	FC Volendam	6–2	Jong FC Utrecht	Volendam
20:00 CEST (UTC+2)	Veerman 32' (pen.), 39', 41'; Ugwu (yellow card) 47'; Ihler 53', 66'; El Meftahi 80'	Report	Chigozie Owen 17'; Ghaddari 46'	Stadium: Kras Stadion; Attendance: 5,823; Referee: Niels Boel

2 November 2026 13	Jong FC Utrecht	3–2	FC Dordrecht	Utrecht
20:00 CET (UTC+1)	Sbai 3'; Van Ommeren 11', 17'; Menzo (yellow card) 70' (yellow-red card) 70'	Report	Van Asten 42'; Plantinga 73' (o.g.)	Stadium: Sportcomplex Zoudenbalch; Attendance: 512; Referee: Thomas Hardeman

7 November 2026 14	FC Den Bosch	1–1	Jong FC Utrecht	's-Hertogenbosch
16:30 CET (UTC+1)	Eikelboom (yellow card) 45+3'; Hoffman 84'	Report	Plantinga (yellow card) 12'; Schuldes 90+1'; Ghaddari (yellow card) 90+3'	Stadium: Stadion De Vliert; Attendance: 5,833; Referee: Jorg Ordelmans

20 November 2026 16	Jong FC Utrecht	1–0	FC Emmen	Utrecht
20:00 CET (UTC+1)	Laaouina (yellow card) 44'; Dundas 80'	Report	Mukeh (yellow card) 35'; Breij (yellow card) 36'; Abdullatif (yellow card) 75'	Stadium: Sportcomplex Zoudenbalch; Attendance: 242; Referee: Stan Smit

23 November 2026 15	Jong PSV	v	Jong FC Utrecht	Eindhoven
20:00 CET (UTC+1)				Stadium: TenCate Stadion De Herdgang; Referee: Steve Janssen

== Statistics ==
=== Goalscorers ===
(Netherlands) Keuken Kampioen Divisie

No.	Name	Goal
1.	(Germany) Emmanuel Chigozie Owen	6
2.	(Netherlands) Massien Ghaddari	4
3.	(Netherlands) Noa Dundas	3
3.	(Netherlands) Björn Menzo	3
5.	(Netherlands) Wessel Kooy	2
5.	(Netherlands) Jaygo van Ommeren	2
5.	(Germany) Jamie Schuldes	2
8.	(Curaçao) Jerayno Hunte	1
8.	(Netherlands) Yousri Sbai	1
Own goals opponent		–
Totals		24

=== Assists ===
(Netherlands) Keuken Kampioen Divisie

No.	Name	
1.	(Netherlands) Massien Ghaddari	5
2.	(Netherlands) Björn Menzo	4
3.	(Netherlands) Tijn den Boggende	2
3.	(Netherlands) Driss Laaouina	2
5.	(Morocco) Oualid Agougil	1
5.	(Netherlands) Wessel Kooy	1
5.	(Netherlands) Viggo Plantinga	1
5.	(Netherlands) Yousri Sbai	1
Totals		17

== Attendance Stadion Galgenwaard ==
Round	Opponent	Attendance	Total attendance	Average
Keuken Kampioen Divisie
2	Vitesse	1,046	1,046	1,046
3	Heracles Almelo	861	1,907	954

== Attendance Sportcomplex Zoudenbalch ==
Round	Opponent	Attendance	Total attendance	Average
Keuken Kampioen Divisie
5	FC Eindhoven	362	362	362
9	Jong Ajax	438	800	400
7	VVV-Venlo	624	1,424	475
11	Roda JC Kerkrade	522	1,946	487
13	FC Dordrecht	512	2,458	492
16	FC Emmen	242	2,700	450
