= 2025–26 Al-Khaleej FC season =

Al-Khaleej
2025–26 season
- President: Ahmed Khuraidah
- Manager: Georgios Donis
- Stadium: Prince Mohamed bin Fahd Stadium
- Pro League: 8th
- King's Cup: Quarter-finals
- Top goalscorer: League: Joshua King (13); All: Joshua King (14)
- All statistics correct as of 31 January 2026.

The 2025–26 season is Al-Khaleej's 81st year in existence and their 11th non-consecutive season in the Pro League. The club is participating in the Pro League and the King's Cup.

The season covers the period from 1 July 2025 to 30 June 2026.

== Players ==
=== Squad information ===
As of 1 July 2025

Note: Flags indicate national team as defined under FIFA eligibility rules; some limited exceptions apply. Players may hold more than one non-FIFA nationality.

No.	Pos.	Nation	Player
2	DF	KSA	Omar Al-Owdah
3	DF	KSA	Mohammed Al-Khabrani
5	DF	POR	Pedro Rebocho
8	MF	KSA	Khaled Al-Samiri
10	MF	POR	Fábio Martins (captain)
14	DF	KSA	Ali Al-Shaafi
15	MF	KSA	Mansour Hamzi
17	MF	GRE	Kostas Fortounis
18	MF	KSA	Murad Hawsawi
19	MF	KSA	Mohammed Al-Abdullah
20	DF	KSA	Abdullah Al-Fahad
21	MF	GRE	Dimitrios Kourbelis
22	GK	KSA	Raed Ozaybi

No.	Pos.	Nation	Player
24	FW	KSA	Ali Abdulraouf
25	DF	KSA	Arif Al Haydar
31	GK	KSA	Mohammed Al-Ghanem
33	DF	KSA	Bander Nasser
35	GK	KSA	Rayan Al-Dossari
39	DF	KSA	Saeed Al Hamsal
47	MF	KSA	Saleh Aboulshamat
48	FW	GAM	Babucarr Seye
66	DF	KSA	Theyab Absa
70	FW	KSA	Abdulmajeed Al-Khathami
71	FW	KSA	Hussain Al-Sultan
96	GK	KSA	Marwan Al-Haidari

== Transfers and loans ==
=== Transfers in ===
Entry date	Position	No.	Player	From club	Fee	Ref.
30 June 2025	GK	96	(Saudi Arabia) Marwan Al-Haidari	(Saudi Arabia) Al-Ettifaq	End of loan	
30 June 2025	DF	16	(Saudi Arabia) Mohammed Al-Khaibari	(Saudi Arabia) Damac	End of loan	
1 July 2025	MF	18	(Saudi Arabia) Murad Hawsawi	(Saudi Arabia) Ohod	$267,000	
9 July 2025	DF	28	(Saudi Arabia) Hamad Al-Jayzani	(Saudi Arabia) Al-Raed	Free	
9 July 2025	MF	12	(Saudi Arabia) Majed Kanabah	(Saudi Arabia) Al-Shabab	Free	
15 July 2025	FW	7	(Norway) Joshua King	(France) Toulouse	Free	
16 July 2025	GK	49	(Luxembourg) Anthony Moris	(Belgium) Union SG	Undisclosed	
4 August 2025	DF	13	(Saudi Arabia) Ahmed Assiri	(Saudi Arabia) Al-Riyadh	Free	
4 August 2025	DF	4	(Netherlands) Bart Schenkeveld	(Greece) Panathinaikos	Free	
9 August 2025	MF	93	(Saudi Arabia) Saleh Al-Amri	(Saudi Arabia) Al-Ittihad	Undisclosed	
6 September 2025	DF	17	(Saudi Arabia) Abdullah Al-Hafith	(Saudi Arabia) Al-Wehda	Free	
24 January 2026	MF	16	(Saudi Arabia) Bader Munshi	(Saudi Arabia) Al-Diriyah	Free	
24 January 2026	MF	20	(Saudi Arabia) Hussain Al-Eisa	(Saudi Arabia) Al-Jabalain	Free	

=== Loans in ===
Start date	End date	Position	No.	Player	From club	Fee	Ref.
4 August 2025	End of season	MF	11	(Spain) Paolo Fernandes	(Greece) AEK Athens	None	
13 August 2025	End of season	MF	9	(Greece) Georgios Masouras	(Greece) Olympiacos	None	

=== Transfers out ===
Exit date	Position	No.	Player	To club	Fee	Ref.
30 June 2025	DF	32	(Democratic Republic of the Congo) Marcel Tisserand	(Saudi Arabia) Al-Ettifaq	End of loan	
30 June 2025	MF	18	(Saudi Arabia) Murad Hawsawi	(Saudi Arabia) Ohod	End of loan	
30 June 2025	MF	43	(Saudi Arabia) Hassan Al-Musallam	(Saudi Arabia) Al-Ettifaq	End of loan	
30 June 2025	MF	99	(Austria) Thomas Murg	(Greece) PAOK	End of loan	
1 July 2025	DF	16	(Saudi Arabia) Mohammed Al-Khaibari	(Saudi Arabia) Al-Riyadh	Free	
1 July 2025	FW	11	(Saudi Arabia) Abdullah Al-Salem	(Saudi Arabia) Al-Qadsiah	Free	
2 July 2025	FW	9	(Egypt) Mohamed Sherif	(Egypt) Al Ahly	Free	
10 July 2025	GK	23	(Bosnia and Herzegovina) Ibrahim Šehić	(Turkey) Çorum	Free	
20 July 2025	FW	48	(The Gambia) Babucarr Seye	(United Arab Emirates) Al Orooba	Free	
1 August 2025	MF	47	(Saudi Arabia) Saleh Aboulshamat	(Saudi Arabia) Al-Ahli	$2,400,000	
26 August 2025	MF	8	(Saudi Arabia) Khaled Al-Samiri	(Saudi Arabia) Damac	Free	
26 August 2025	MF	10	(Portugal) Fábio Martins	(Saudi Arabia) Al-Hazem	Free	
31 August 2025	DF	20	(Saudi Arabia) Abdullah Al-Fahad	(Saudi Arabia) Abha	Free	
10 September 2025	GK	22	(Saudi Arabia) Raed Ozaybi	(Saudi Arabia) Neom	Free	
10 September 2025	DF	2	(Saudi Arabia) Omar Al-Owdah	(Saudi Arabia) Al-Jubail	Free	
21 January 2026	GK	35	(Saudi Arabia) Rayan Al-Dossary	(Saudi Arabia) Al-Hilal	$4,800,000	
21 January 2026	MF	18	(Saudi Arabia) Murad Hawsawi	(Saudi Arabia) Al-Hilal	$8,000,000	

=== Loans out ===
Start date	End date	Position	No.	Player	To club	Fee	Ref.
17 January 2026	End of season	DF	14	(Saudi Arabia) Ali Al-Shaafi	(Saudi Arabia) Al-Zulfi	None	

== Pre-season ==
30 July 2025 Friendly	Al-Khaleej (Saudi Arabia)	1–2	(United Arab Emirates) Al-Wasl	Huissen, Netherlands
18:00 CEST	Diallo (o.g.)	Report	Bouftini; Palacios	Stadium: Sportpark De Rode Veste

2 August 2025 Friendly	Al-Khaleej (Saudi Arabia)	2–3	(Netherlands) Heracles Almelo	Almelo, Netherlands
17:00 CEST	Al-Sultan; Fortounis	Report	Reine-Adélaïde; Engels,	Stadium: Asito Stadion

6 August 2025 Friendly	Al-Khaleej (Saudi Arabia)	3–2	(Netherlands) Jong AZ	Maurik, Netherlands
13:00 CEST	Hamzi; Abdulraouf; Al-Abdullah	Report		Stadium: Gemeentelijk Sportpark

13 August 2025 Friendly	Al-Khaleej (Saudi Arabia)	2–2	(Netherlands) Jong FC Utrecht	Netherlands
13:00 CEST	Hawsawi,	Report	Dundas den Boggende

21 August 2025 Friendly	Al-Khaleej (Saudi Arabia)	2–2	(Saudi Arabia) Al-Ettifaq	Dammam, Saudi Arabia
18:50 AST	Masouras 9'; Al-Amri 83' (pen.)	Report	Al-Otaibi 18'; Calvo 54'	Stadium: EGO Stadium

== Competitions ==
=== Overview ===
Competition	Record							
Competition	Pld	W	D	L	GF	GA	GD	Win %
Pro League	18	7	4	7	38	30	+8	38.89
King's Cup	3	1	1	1	9	5	+4	33.33
Total	21	8	5	8	47	35	+12	38.10

Updated to match played 28 January 2026
Source: Competitions

=== Pro League ===
==== League table ====
Pos	Team	Pld	W	D	L	GF	GA	GD	Pts
10	Al-Fayha	34	10	8	16	41	54	−13	38
11	Al-Fateh	34	9	10	15	41	55	−14	37
12	Al-Khaleej	34	10	7	17	54	62	−8	37
13	Al-Shabab	34	8	11	15	44	57	−13	35
14	Al-Kholood	34	9	6	19	39	61	−22	33

Source: SPL
Rules for classification: 1) Points; 2) Head-to-head points; 3) Head-to-head goal difference; 4) Total goal difference; 5) Total goals scored; 6) Fair-play points
(Note: Head-to-head record is used only after all the matches between the teams in question have been played).

==== Results summary ====
Overall								Home						Away					
Pld	W	D	L	GF	GA	GD	Pts	W	D	L	GF	GA	GD	W	D	L	GF	GA	GD
18	7	4	7	38	30	+8	25	4	2	2	19	8	+11	3	2	5	19	22	−3

Last updated: 28 January 2026.
Source: Saudi Pro League

==== Results by round ====
Round	1	2	3	4	5	6	7	8	9	11	12	13	14	15	16	17	18	19	20	21	22	23	10	24	25	26	27	28	29	30	31	32	33	34
Ground	A	H	A	H	H	A	H	A	A	A	H	A	H	A	H	A	H	A	H	A	A	H	H	A	H	H	A	H	A	H	A	H	A	H
Result	W	W	L	L	W	D	D	W	L	L	L	D	W	W	W	L	D	L																
Position	3	2	4	10	6	6	7	6	6	9	9	9	9	8	8	8	8	8																

Updated to match(es) played on 30 January 2026. Source: Saudi Pro League
A = Away; H = Home; W = Win; D = Draw; L = Loss

==== Matches ====
All times are local, AST (UTC+3).

Win Draw Loss Postponed

29 August 2025 1	Al-Shabab	1–4	Al-Khaleej	Riyadh
21:00	Carrasco 59' (pen.), (yellow card) 66'	Report	King 5', 82'; Masouras (yellow card) 39'; Al-Khabrani (yellow card) 45'; Fortounis 53' (pen.); Al Hamsal (yellow card) 58'; Kourbelis (yellow card) 62'; Al-Amri 64'; Assiri (yellow card) 74'; Kanabah (yellow card) 90+5'	Stadium: Al-Shabab Club Stadium; Attendance: 2,894; Referee: Khalid Al-Turais

13 September 2025 2	Al-Khaleej	3–0	Al-Fayha	Dammam
18:25	King 5'; Hawsawi (yellow card) 45+1'; Kourbelis 64'; Fernandes 90+1'	Report	Bamsaud (yellow card) 25'; Sakala (yellow card) 47'	Stadium: Prince Mohamed bin Fahd Stadium; Attendance: 1,639; Referee: Abdullah Al-Owaidan

19 September 2025 3	Al-Qadsiah	2–1	Al-Khaleej	Dammam
18:15	Retegui 10'; Al-Salem 90+1'	Report	King (yellow card) 68', (goal) 78'; Masouras (yellow card) 90+4'	Stadium: Prince Mohamed bin Fahd Stadium; Attendance: 2,311; Referee: Sebastian Gishamer (Austria)

25 September 2025 4	Al-Khaleej	0–1	Al-Taawoun	Dammam
18:10	Rebocho (yellow card) 36'	Report	Hawsawi (yellow card) 80'; Barrow 87'	Stadium: Prince Mohamed bin Fahd Stadium; Attendance: 1,423; Referee: Abdullah Al-Kharboush

19 October 2025 5	Al-Khaleej	4–1	Al-Riyadh	Dammam
17:45	King 7', 25', 56'; Al-Khabrani (yellow card) 38'; Masouras 66'; Hawsawi (yellow card) 70'	Report	Sylla 45+1'; Soro (yellow card) 61'; Al-Khaibari (yellow card) 90+5'	Stadium: Prince Mohamed bin Fahd Stadium; Attendance: 1,884; Referee: Ahmed Al-Rumaikhani

24 October 2025 6	Neom	1–1	Al-Khaleej	Tabuk
18:30	Zézé (yellow card) 15'; Lacazette (yellow card) 22'; Rodríguez 34'; Hegazi (yellow card) 75'	Report	Al-Amri 16'; Hawsawi (yellow card) 78'	Stadium: King Khalid Sport City Stadium; Attendance: 2,169; Referee: Khaled Al-Ahmari

1 November 2025 7	Al-Khaleej	4–4	Al-Ittihad	Dammam
17:35	King 14', 47'; Fortounis 18', 37' (pen.); Schenkeveld (yellow card) 29'; Hawsawi (yellow card) 45+3'; Al Haydar (yellow card) 90+7'	Report	Mitaj (yellow card) 22', (goal) 90+6'; Al-Shehri (yellow card) 27'; Fabinho (red card) 32'; Diaby 51', 86', (yellow card) 90+8'; F. Al-Ghamdi 90+8'	Stadium: Prince Mohamed bin Fahd Stadium; Attendance: 13,504; Referee: Sami Al-Jires

6 November 2025 8	Al-Hazem	1–4	Al-Khaleej	Buraidah
17:55	Martins 38', (yellow card) 44'; Mokwana (yellow card) 44'; Boutouil (yellow card) 54'; Al-Habshi (yellow card) 65'	Report	Fortounis 8'; Al Hamsal (yellow card) 16'; Kourbelis (yellow card) 41'; Fernandes (yellow card) 45' (yellow-red card) 59', (goal) 58' (pen.); Masouras 45+1', 75'	Stadium: King Abdullah Sports City; Attendance: 1,064; Referee: Mohammed Abu Shaqarah

23 November 2025 9	Al-Nassr	4–1	Al-Khaleej	Riyadh
20:30	Brozović (yellow card) 9'; Félix 39'; Wesley 42'; Yahya (yellow card) 56'; Mané 77', (yellow card) 82'; Ronaldo 90+6'	Report	Hawsawi (yellow card) 4', (goal) 47'; Kourbelis (red card) 90'	Stadium: Al-Awwal Park; Attendance: 26,003; Referee: Mohammed Al-Ismail

26 December 2025 11	Al-Hilal	3–2	Al-Khaleej	Riyadh
20:30	Kanno 18'; Milinković-Savić 39'; Malcom 57'; Al-Tambakti (yellow card) 65'; Hernández (yellow card) 90+1'	Report	Al-Khabrani (yellow card) 24'; Schenkeveld (yellow card) 38'; Kanabah (yellow card) 41'; King 79'; Masouras 84'	Stadium: Kingdom Arena; Attendance: 13,300; Referee: Serdar Gözübüyük (Netherlands)

29 December 2025 12	Al-Khaleej	0–1	Al-Fateh	Dammam
17:35	Schenkeveld (yellow card) 45+3'; Al-Khabrani (yellow card) 80'	Report	Baattiah (yellow card) 29'; Vargas 41'; Fernandes (yellow card) 68'; Al-Sahihi (yellow card) 85'; Al-Othman (yellow card) 90+3'	Stadium: Prince Mohamed bin Fahd Stadium; Attendance: 3,294; Referee: Abdullah Al-Kharbosh

2 January 2026 13	Al-Najma	2–2	Al-Khaleej	Buraidah
16:30	Lázaro 50'; Samir 90+6'	Report	Al-Hafith (yellow card) 39'; Masouras 72'; King 74'; Hamzi (yellow card) 84'; Moris (yellow card) 85'; Kanabah (red card) 90+3'	Stadium: King Abdullah Sports City; Attendance: 370; Referee: Fraih Al-Jaloud

9 January 2026 14	Al-Khaleej	4–0	Damac	Dammam
16:10	Fortounis 1'; Masouras 44'; King 47'; Al-Sultan 80'; Rebocho (yellow card) 85'	Report	Medina (yellow card) 9'; Bedrane (red card) 24'	Stadium: Prince Mohamed bin Fahd Stadium; Attendance: 1,753; Referee: Abdulsamad Bakri

12 January 2026 15	Al-Ettifaq	1–2	Al-Khaleej	Dammam
20:30	Dembélé 1'; Wijnaldum (yellow card) 29'; Duda (yellow card) 43'	Report	Fortounis 45' (pen.); Hendry 86' (o.g.); Moris (yellow card) 90+4'	Stadium: EGO Stadium; Attendance: 2,419; Referee: Mohammed Al-Ismail

16 January 2026 16	Al-Khaleej	4–1	Al-Okhdood	Dammam
17:45	Rebocho (yellow card) 7'; King 37'; Masouras 50', 80'; Fortounis 77'	Report	Al-Salem (yellow card) 74'; Asiri (yellow card) 88'; Al Hatila 90+2'	Stadium: Prince Mohamed bin Fahd Stadium; Attendance: 2,178; Referee: Shukri Al-Hanfosh

20 January 2026 17	Al-Ahli	4–1	Al-Khaleej	Jeddah
20:30	Toney (yellow card) 46', (goal) 59', 67', 77'; Hawsawi (yellow card) 51'; Demiral (yellow card) 57'; Hamed 86'	Report	Masouras 19'; Schenkeveld (yellow card) 37'; Moris (yellow card) 65'; Al Haydar (yellow card) 90+3'	Stadium: Alinma Stadium; Attendance: 15,067; Referee: Abdullah Al-Owaydan

24 January 2026 18	Al-Khaleej	0–0	Al-Shabab	Dammam
16:25	Al-Khabrani (yellow card) 31' (yellow-red card) 68'; Al Hamsal (yellow card) 74'; Hamzi (yellow card) 84'	Report	Balobaid (yellow card) 38'; Al-Shuwayrikh (yellow card) 59'	Stadium: Prince Mohamed bin Fahd Stadium; Attendance: 2,519; Referee: Abdullah Al-Kharboush

28 January 2026 19	Al-Fayha	3–1	Al-Khaleej	Al Majma'ah
20:30	Al-Sultan 18' (o.g.); Smalling 38'; Sakala 42'	Report	Schenkeveld (yellow card) 36'; Masouras 80'	Stadium: Al-Majma'ah Sports City Stadium; Attendance: 562; Referee: Ahmed Al-Rumaikhani

21 December 2025 10	Al-Khaleej	v	Al-Kholood	Dammam
20:30				Stadium: Prince Mohamed bin Fahd Stadium

=== King's Cup ===
All times are local, AST (UTC+3).

22 September 2025 Round of 32	Al-Tai	0–5	Al-Khaleej	Ha'il
18:45	Al-Shamlan (yellow card) 51'; Halilović (yellow card) 85'	Report	Masouras 1'; Hawsawi 53'; Al-Quamiri 57' (o.g.); Assiri (yellow card) 64'; Fernandes 67', 79', (yellow card) 85'	Stadium: Prince Abdulaziz bin Musa'ed Sports City; Attendance: 1,103; Referee: Mohammed Abu Shaqarah

27 October 2025 Round of 16	Al-Khaleej	1–1 (a.e.t.) (5–3 p)	Al-Taawoun	Dammam
17:35	King 8'; Al-Hafith (yellow card) 21'	Report	Al-Mufarrij (yellow card) 15'; Martínez 24'; Girotto (yellow card) 45+2'	Stadium: Prince Mohamed bin Fahd Stadium; Referee: Shukri Al-Hanfoush
	Penalties
	Al-Amri (penalty scored); Masouras (penalty scored); Hawsawi (penalty scored); Al Haydar (penalty scored); Kourbelis (penalty scored)		(penalty scored) El Mahdioui; (penalty scored) Adam; (penalty scored) Girotto; (penalty missed) Al-Ahmed

28 November 2025 Quarter-finals	Al-Kholood	4–3	Al-Khaleej	Ar Rass
17:50	Enrique 3'; Maolida 24'; Bahebri 45+3'; Buckley (yellow card) 61', (goal) 83'	Report	Hamzi 45+1'; Al-Amri 47'; Kourbelis (yellow card) 53'; Pinas 90+2' (o.g.); Fortounis (yellow card) 90+3'	Stadium: Al-Hazem Club Stadium; Attendance: 1,183; Referee: Majed Al-Shamrani

== Statistics ==
=== Appearances ===
Last updated on 28 January 2026.

No.	Pos	Nat	Player	Total		Pro League		King's Cup	
No.	Pos	Nat	Player	Apps	Goals	Apps	Goals	Apps	Goals
Goalkeepers
49	GK	(Luxembourg) LUX	Anthony Moris	21	0	18	0	3	0
96	GK	(Saudi Arabia) KSA	Marwan Al-Haidari	0	0	0	0	0	0
Defenders
3	DF	(Saudi Arabia) KSA	Mohammed Al-Khabrani	19	0	16	0	3	0
4	DF	(Netherlands) NED	Bart Schenkeveld	18	0	17	0	0+1	0
5	DF	(Portugal) POR	Pedro Rebocho	21	0	18	0	3	0
13	DF	(Saudi Arabia) KSA	Ahmed Assiri	11	0	0+8	0	2+1	0
17	DF	(Saudi Arabia) KSA	Abdullah Al-Hafith	14	0	3+8	0	3	0
25	DF	(Saudi Arabia) KSA	Arif Al Haydar	7	0	0+5	0	0+2	0
26	DF	(Saudi Arabia) KSA	Raed Al-Shanqiti	0	0	0	0	0	0
28	DF	(Saudi Arabia) KSA	Hamad Al-Jayzani	7	0	0+5	0	2	0
33	DF	(Saudi Arabia) KSA	Bandar Nasser	6	0	0+5	0	0+1	0
39	DF	(Saudi Arabia) KSA	Saeed Al Hamsal	20	0	18	0	1+1	0
Midfielders
8	MF	(The Gambia) GAM	Abdoulie Mboge	2	0	0+2	0	0	0
9	MF	(Greece) GRE	Georgios Masouras	20	11	18	10	2	1
10	MF	(Greece) GRE	Kostas Fortounis	17	7	16	7	1	0
11	MF	(Spain) ESP	Paolo Fernandes	15	4	7+5	2	2+1	2
12	MF	(Saudi Arabia) KSA	Majed Kanabah	20	0	10+7	0	2+1	0
15	MF	(Saudi Arabia) KSA	Mansour Hamzi	19	1	8+8	0	3	1
16	MF	(Saudi Arabia) KSA	Bader Munshi	1	0	0+1	0	0	0
19	MF	(Saudi Arabia) KSA	Mohammed Al-Abdullah	0	0	0	0	0	0
21	MF	(Greece) GRE	Dimitrios Kourbelis	18	1	16	1	1+1	0
23	MF	(Saudi Arabia) KSA	Rakan Al-Kaabi	1	0	0+1	0	0	0
93	MF	(Saudi Arabia) KSA	Saleh Al-Amri	15	3	7+5	2	2+1	1
Forwards
7	FW	(Norway) NOR	Joshua King	18	14	15+2	13	1	1
24	FW	(Saudi Arabia) KSA	Ali Abdulraouf	6	0	1+4	0	0+1	0
27	FW	(Saudi Arabia) KSA	Abdullah Al-Zaynaldeen	2	0	0+2	0	0	0
71	FW	(Saudi Arabia) KSA	Hussain Al-Sultan	9	1	2+5	1	0+2	0
Players sent out on loan this season
14	DF	(Saudi Arabia) KSA	Ali Al-Shaafi	1	0	0+1	0	0	0
Player who made an appearance this season but have left the club
18	MF	(Saudi Arabia) KSA	Murad Hawsawi	11	2	8	1	2+1	1
35	GK	(Saudi Arabia) KSA	Rayan Al-Dossari	0	0	0	0	0	0

=== Goalscorers ===
Rank	No.	Pos	Nat	Name	Pro League	King's Cup	Total
1	7	FW	(Norway)	Joshua King	13	1	14
2	9	MF	(Greece)	Georgios Masouras	10	1	11
3	10	MF	(Greece)	Kostas Fortounis	7	0	7
4	11	MF	(Spain)	Paolo Fernandes	2	2	4
5	93	MF	(Saudi Arabia)	Saleh Al-Amri	2	1	3
6	18	MF	(Saudi Arabia)	Murad Hawsawi	1	1	2
7	15	MF	(Saudi Arabia)	Mansour Hamzi	0	1	1
7	21	MF	(Greece)	Dimitrios Kourbelis	1	0	1
7	71	FW	(Saudi Arabia)	Hussain Al-Sultan	1	0	1
Own goal					1	2	3
Total					38	9	47

Last Updated: 28 January 2026

=== Assists ===
Rank	No.	Pos	Nat	Name	Pro League	King's Cup	Total
1	10	MF	(Greece)	Kostas Fortounis	10	0	10
2	5	DF	(Portugal)	Pedro Rebocho	5	1	6
3	4	DF	(Netherlands)	Bart Schenkeveld	2	0	2
3	7	FW	(Norway)	Joshua King	2	0	2
3	9	MF	(Greece)	Georgios Masouras	2	0	2
3	11	MF	(Spain)	Paolo Fernandes	1	1	2
3	18	MF	(Saudi Arabia)	Murad Hawsawi	1	1	2
3	49	GK	(Luxembourg)	Anthony Moris	2	0	2
9	12	MF	(Saudi Arabia)	Majed Kanabah	1	0	1
9	17	DF	(Saudi Arabia)	Abdullah Al-Hafith	1	0	1
9	21	MF	(Greece)	Dimitrios Kourbelis	1	0	1
9	25	DF	(Saudi Arabia)	Arif Al Haydar	0	1	1
9	39	DF	(Saudi Arabia)	Saeed Al Hamsal	1	0	1
Total					29	4	33

Last Updated: 28 January 2026

=== Clean sheets ===
Rank	No.	Pos	Nat	Name	Pro League	King's Cup	Total
1	49	GK	(Luxembourg)	Anthony Moris	3	1	4
Total					3	1	4

Last Updated: 24 January 2026
