= Markus Jensen =

Danish footballer (born 2005)

Personal information
- Full name: Markus Gustav Jensen
- Date of birth: 15 July 2005 (age 21)
- Place of birth: Odense, Denmark
- Height: 1.84 m (6 ft 0 in)
- Position: Attacking midfielder

Team information
- Current team: Nacional
- Number: 7

Youth career
- 2011–2023: OB

Senior career*
Years	Team	Apps	(Gls)
2023–2026	OB	47	(1)
2025–2026	→ Jong Utrecht (loan)	30	(2)
2026–	Nacional	6	(0)

International career
2022	Denmark U17	2	(1)
2022–2023	Denmark U18	3	(0)
2023	Denmark U19	1	(0)
- * Club domestic league appearances and goals as of 12 September 2026

Markus Gustav Jensen (born 15 July 2005) is a Danish footballer who plays as an attacking midfielder for Primeira Liga club Nacional.

== Club career ==
=== OB ===
Jensen is a product of OB, where he started at the age of 6. In the summer 2020, he signed his first youth contract with the club.

Ahead of the 2022–23 season, Jensen signed a new contract with OB until June 2025. In the same 2022–23 season, 17-year-old Jensen also made his debut for OB's first team when he replaced Jakob Breum in the 69th minute of the Danish Superliga match against Lyngby Boldklub on 21 May 2023. On 10 August 2023, Jensen was permanently promoted to OB's first team squad, and signed a new three-year deal with the club.

In August 2025, Jensen extended his contract with OB until June 2027 and was, at the same time, loaned out to Dutch club Jong FC Utrecht.

=== Nacional ===
On 19 July 2026, Jensen moved to Nacional in Portugal on a four-year contract.

== Honours ==
OB

- Danish 1st Division: 2024–25
