= Emeka Adiele =

English footballer (born 2007)

Personal information
- Full name: Chukwuemeka Fortune Adiele
- Date of birth: 31 July 2007 (age 19)
- Place of birth: London, England
- Height: 1.73 m (5 ft 8 in)
- Position: Left-back

Team information
- Current team: Burton Albion (on loan from Utrecht)
- Number: 23

Youth career
- 2016–2026: West Ham United

Senior career*
Years	Team	Apps	(Gls)
2026–	Jong Utrecht	8	(0)
2026–	Utrecht	2	(0)
2026–	→ Burton Albion (loan)	0	(0)

International career^{‡}
2023	England U17	3	(0)
2024–2025	England U18	6	(0)
- * Club domestic league appearances and goals as of 28 April 2026 ‡ National team caps and goals as of 14:42, 18 August 2026 (UTC)

Chukwuemeka Fortune Adiele (born 31 July 2007) is an English professional footballer who plays as a full-back for EFL League One club Burton Albion, on loan from Eredivisie club Utrecht.

== Club career ==
Adiele is a youth product of West Ham United, having joined the club at the age of nine.

In July 2024, he signed his first professional contract with West Ham.

In February 2026, Adiele signed for Utrecht in the Eredivisie, first playing with the reserve in Eerste Divisie, while regularly training with the first team.

Adiele made his professional debut with Jong Utrecht in a 1–1 Eerste Divisie draw with Willem II on 16 February 2026.

On 18 August 2026, Adiele joined League One side Burton Albion on a season-long loan deal.

== International career ==
Born in England, Adiele also has Nigerian origins. He is a youth international for England, having played for the under-17s and under-18s.

== Career statistics ==
As of match played 26 April 2026

Appearances and goals by club, season and competition
Club	Season	League			Cup		Europe		Other		Total	
Club	Season	Division	Apps	Goals	Apps	Goals	Apps	Goals	Apps	Goals	Apps	Goals
West Ham United U21	2024–25	—			—		—		5 (Note: Three appearances in EFL Trophy, two appearances in Premier League Cup)	0	5	0
West Ham United U21	2025–26	—			—		—		6 (Note: Five appearances in EFL Trophy, one appearance in Premier League Cup)	0	6	0
West Ham United U21	Total		—		—		—		11	0	11	0
Jong Utrecht	2025–26	Eerste Divisie	7	0	—		—		—		7	0
Utrecht	2025–26	Eredivisie	2	0	—		—		—		2	0
Career total			9	0	0	0	0	0	11	0	20	0
