= Murad Hawsawi =

Saudi Arabian footballer (born 2001)

Personal information
- Full name: Murad Othman Harun Hawsawi
- Date of birth: 3 June 2001 (age 25)
- Place of birth: Medina, Saudi Arabia
- Height: 1.80 m (5 ft 11 in)
- Position: Central midfielder

Team information
- Current team: Al Hilal
- Number: 18

Youth career
- –2022: Ohod

Senior career*
Years	Team	Apps	(Gls)
2022–2025	Ohod	25	(1)
2024–2025	→ Al-Khaleej (loan)	31	(1)
2025–2026	Al-Khaleej	8	(1)
2026–	Al Hilal	14	(0)

International career^{‡}
2025–	Saudi Arabia	2	(0)
- * Club domestic league appearances and goals as of 31 October 2026 ‡ National team caps and goals as of 11 December 2025

Murad Hawsawi (Arabic: مراد هوساوي; born 3 June 2001) is a Saudi Arabian professional footballer who plays as a central Midfielder for Al Hilal and the Saudi Arabia national team.

== Club career ==
Hawsawi started his career at the youth teams of Ohod. He reached the first team in the 2022–2023 season. On 23 July 2024, Hawsawi joined Pro League side Al-Khaleej on a one-year loan. On 1 March 2025, he moved to Al-Khaleej on a permanent deal. On 17 January 2026, Hawsawi joined Al Hilal for five-years deal.
