= Mark Otten =

Dutch footballer and manager

Personal information
- Date of birth: 2 September 1985 (age 41)
- Place of birth: Nijmegen, Netherlands
- Height: 1.80 m (5 ft 11 in)
- Position: Defender

Team information
- Current team: Jong Utrecht (head coach)

Youth career
- RKSV Brakkenstein
- 1998–2003: NEC

Senior career*
Years	Team	Apps	(Gls)
2003–2004	NEC	3	(0)
2004–2007	Feyenoord	0	(0)
2004–2006	→ Excelsior (loan)	66	(1)
2006–2007	→ NEC (loan)	27	(0)
2007–2011	NEC	28	(1)
2011–2014	Ferencváros	35	(1)
Total		159	(3)

International career
2001	Netherlands U16	7	(0)
2001–2002	Netherlands U17	11	(1)
2003–2004	Netherlands U19	11	(0)
2006–2007	Netherlands U20	2	(0)

Managerial career
- 2016–2017: NEC (youth)
- 2017–2018: RKSV Brakkenstein
- 2017–2019: Feyenoord (youth)
- 2019–2023: NEC (youth)
- 2019–2020: RKHVV
- 2022–2023: Eindhoven (assistant)
- 2023–2025: NEC (assistant)
- 2025–: Jong Utrecht
- * Club domestic league appearances and goals

Mark Otten (born 2 September 1985) is a Dutch professional football coach and a former defender who is the head coach of Eerste Divisie club Jong Utrecht.

== Club career ==
=== NEC ===
Born in Nijmegen, Otten developed into a professional football player within the NEC youth academy. He joined the team at age 12, after having been discovered for the local youth team RKSV Brakkenstein where his father, Roger Otten, was a coach. In January 2003, he was included in the first-team squad by head coach Johan Neeskens for their training camp in Alanya, Turkey.

On 27 March 2004, Otten made his professional debut in the Eredivisie in a 5–2 away loss to NAC Breda, coming on as an 87th-minute substitute. He would go on to make two more appearances during the season, as NEC finished the 2003–04 season in 14th place, six points clear of relegation play-offs.

=== Feyenoord ===
In April 2004, it was announced that Otten would move to Feyenoord in the following season, after having signed a three-year contract with the club. He would, however, struggle to break into the first team, and spent time on loan with Excelsior for two seasons. In the 2005–06 season, Otten won the second-tier Eerste Divisie with the club. The following season, 2006–07, he was loaned out to his childhood club, NEC. He suffered an injury in his upper leg in a pre-season tournament in Den Helder in July 2006, keeping him out for the start of the season. In April 2007, he suffered a knee injury, which meant that he was sidelined for six months.

=== Return to NEC ===
Despite suffering a knee injury, Otten signed permanently for his first club NEC in June 2007, penning a four-year deal.

In the 2007–08 season Otten regained his place in the starting lineup of NEC and in the opening game of the 2008–09 he made his official return to Eredivisie action. He crowned this achievement by scoring the 2–0 goal against De Graafschap. On 4 Match 2009, Otten suffered another knee injury in the KNVB Cup match against SC Heerenveen. After a new cruciate ligament operation, he was set to miss six to nine months.

=== Ferencváros ===
In 2011, Otten's contract with NEC was not extended and on 14 June 2011 he signed a two-year contract with a third year option with Hungarian club Ferencváros. In his first season, he played regularly but afterwards suffered injuries. He was part of the team winning the 2012–13 Ligakupa. In February 2014, he was demoted to the reserve team of the club, alongside fellow countrymen Jack Tuijp and Arsenio Valpoort after the firing of Dutch manager Ricardo Moniz. In the summer of 2014, his contract expired and he decided to retire due to persistent injuries.

== International career ==
Otten represented the Netherlands at youth international level. He was a member of the Dutch squad at the 2005 FIFA World Youth Championship. The team was eliminated in the quarter-final against Nigeria.

== Coaching career ==
While playing for NEC, Otten worked as a youth coach at RKSV Brakkenstein, and was appointed assistant manager of the first team after his retirement as a player in 2014. In his first season, the team won the Vijfde Klasse. In 2015, he joined the staff of his former club NEC where he coached in the youth department. In April 2016, he moved to Feyenoord where he was appointed the coach of the U15 team.

On 22 March 2019, it was announced that Otten would become the new head coach of RKHVV in the Eerste Klasse on a one-year contract while continuing in his role as a youth coach at NEC. In December, he stated that he would not extend his contract with RKHVV in order to focus on his obligations at NEC.

In 2021, he managed the NEC U21 team.

== Honours ==
Excelsior

- Eerste Divisie: 2005–06

Ferencváros

- Hungarian League Cup: 2012–13
