= Sportcomplex Zoudenbalch =

Sports facility in Utrecht, Netherlands

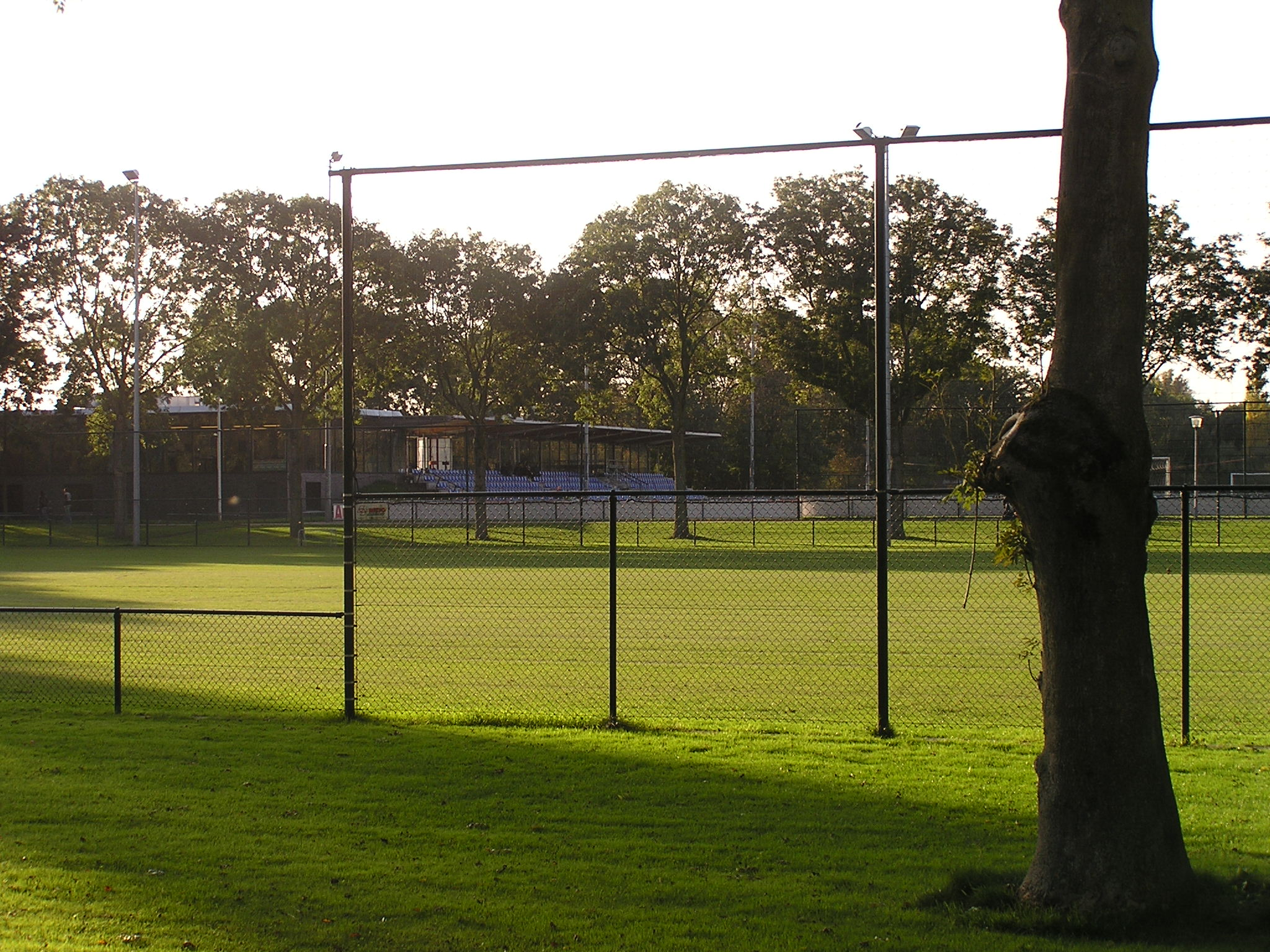
- Interactive map of Sportcomplex Zoudenbalch
- Location: Utrecht
- Capacity: 450 (tribune) 1,000 total

Tenants
- Jong FC Utrecht; Domstad Majella; VV Odin; VV Sterrenwijk

Zoudenbalch is the sports facility that is the home field for women's Eredivisie club FC Utrecht, Jong FC Utrecht, and FC Utrecht youth teams. It is a training site for Eredivisie club FC Utrecht.

The sports complex is named after Utrecht's Zoudenbalch family.
