= Noa Dundas =

Dutch association football player (born 2004)

Personal information
- Full name: Noa Malik Dundas
- Date of birth: 13 April 2004 (age 22)
- Height: 1.80 m (5 ft 11 in)
- Position: Midfielder

Team information
- Current team: Jong Utrecht
- Number: 16

Youth career
- –2021: Excelsior Rotterdam

Senior career*
Years	Team	Apps	(Gls)
2021-2022	Excelsior	2	(0)
2022-2024	Basel U21	51	(3)
2024-	Jong Utrecht	63	(5)

International career
2021-2022	Netherlands U18	4	(0)
2022	Netherlands U19	1	(0)
- * Club domestic league appearances and goals as of 28 April 2026

Noa Malik Dundas (born 13 April 2004) is a Dutch professional footballer who plays as a midfielder for Eerste Divisie side Jong FC Utrecht. He is a Dutch youth international.

== Club career ==
=== Excelsior ===
Dundas was born in the Netherlands, and entered the Excelsior Rotterdam training programme at the age of twelve years-old. He progressed through their youth teams and made his debut in the first team at the age of seventeen, under coach Marinus Dijkhuizen against NAC Breda in October 2021.

=== FC Basel ===
In 2022, he signed for Swiss side FC Basel, where he spent two seasons, and made 51 Promotion League appearances for Basel U21, scoring three goals.

=== FC Utrecht ===
He signed for FC Utrecht in July 2024, agreeing to a three-year contract and initially joining up with Jong FC Utrecht in the Eerste Divisie. He scored his first league goal for Jong Utrecht on 30 November 2024 in a 1–1 away draw with TOP Oss.

== International career ==
He made his debut for the Netherlands national under-18 football team in late 2021. In September 2022, he featured for the Netherlands U19 side against Northern Ireland U19.
