= Jong FC Utrecht =

Association football club in the Netherlands

Jong FC Utrecht (U23)
- Full name: Football Club Utrecht
- Nicknames: Utreg, Cupfighters, Domstedelingen ("Cathedral Citizens")
- Founded: 1 July 1970; 56 years ago
- Stadium: Sportcomplex Zoudenbalch; Stadion Galgenwaard
- Capacity: 1,000 (of which 450 seats); 23,750
- Owner(s): Frans van Seumeren Holding B.V. (99%); Stichting Continuïteit FC Utrecht (1%) overige aandeelhouders (41%)
- Chairman: Steef Klop
- Head coach: Mark Otten
- League: Eerste Divisie
- 2025–26: Eerste Divisie, 12th of 20
- Website: www.fcutrecht.nl
Home colours	Away colours	Third colours

Jong FC Utrecht (U23) is a Dutch football team, based in Utrecht. It is the reserve team of FC Utrecht and plays in the Eerste Divisie since the 2016–17 Eerste Divisie season.

== Current squad ==
As of 18 September 2026

Note: Flags indicate national team as defined under FIFA eligibility rules; some limited exceptions apply. Players may hold more than one non-FIFA nationality.

No.	Pos.	Nation	Player
—	GK	NED	Justin Eversen
—	GK	NED	Laolu Oladipo
—	GK	NED	Martin Tsankov
—	DF	NED	Noël Beulens
—	DF	NED	Wessel Kooy
—	DF	NED	Driss Laaouina
—	DF	NED	Viggo Plantinga (captain)
—	DF	GER	Ferdinand Pohl
—	DF	NED	Thomas Reinders
—	DF	NED	Yousri Sbai (on loan from N.E.C.)
—	DF	GER	Jamie Schuldes
—	MF	MKD	Abdullah Aslani

No.	Pos.	Nation	Player
—	MF	NED	Noa Dundas
—	MF	NED	Massien Ghaddari
—	MF	NED	Kenji Goes
—	MF	CZE	Matyáš Havelka
—	MF	NED	Jaygo van Ommeren
—	MF	NED	Jessey Sneijder
—	FW	NED	Tijn den Boggende
—	FW	GHA	Nana Gyamfi-Amoah
—	FW	CUW	Jerayno Hunte
—	FW	NED	Björn Menzo
—	FW	SWE	Richie Omorowa (on loan from Samsunspor)
—	FW	NED	Levi Rietveld

=== Out on loan ===
Note: Flags indicate national team as defined under FIFA eligibility rules; some limited exceptions apply. Players may hold more than one non-FIFA nationality.

No.	Pos.	Nation	Player
—	DF	NED	Neal Viereck (at CD Tenerife until 30 June 2027)

== Technical staff ==
Position	Name
Head coach	(Netherlands) Mark Otten
Assistant coach	(Netherlands) Hidde van Boven
Goalkeeper coach	(Netherlands) Edwin Zoetebier

== Results ==
Below is a table with Jong FC Utrecht's domestic results since their introduction in professional football in 2016.

Domestic Results since 2016
Domestic league	League result	Qualification to
2025–26 Eerste Divisie	12th	–
2024–25 Eerste Divisie	19th	–
2023–24 Eerste Divisie	20th	–
2022–23 Eerste Divisie	20th	–
2021–22 Eerste Divisie	18th	–
2020–21 Eerste Divisie	18th	–
2019–20 Eerste Divisie (Note: Season ended earlier due to COVID-19.)	12th	–
2018–19 Eerste Divisie	19th	–
2017–18 Eerste Divisie	20th	–
2016–17 Eerste Divisie	18th	–

== Stadium ==
They play their home matches at Sportcomplex Zoudenbalch. Sometimes they play at Stadion Galgenwaard. From 2016 to 2018, they played select matches at Sportpark De Westmaat.
